= 2015 Diamond Challenge =

International netball series hosted by South Africa

Tournament details
- Host country: South Africa
- Cities: Margate, KwaZulu-Natal
- Venue: Ugu Sports Centre
- Dates: 16–19 June 2015
- Teams: 4
- TV partner: SuperSport (South Africa)

Final positions
- Champions: South Africa
- Runners-up: Malawi
- Third place: Uganda

The 2015 Diamond Challenge was the third Diamond Challenge netball series. It featured South Africa, Malawi, Uganda and Zambia. The series was played in June 2015 at Margate's Ugu Sports Centre. With a team coached by Norma Plummer and captained by Maryka Holtzhausen, South Africa won the series. South Africa finished the series undefeated, winning all four of their matches. In the final they defeated Malawi 40–35. The series was broadcast live on SuperSport in South Africa.

== Head coaches and captains ==
Team	Head coach	Captain
South Africa	Norma Plummer	Maryka Holtzhausen; Karla Mostert
Malawi	Peace Chawinga-Kaluwa	Caroline Mtukule
Uganda	Fred Mugerwa	Peace Proscovia
Zambia		Carol Moono

== South Africa squad ==
South Africa roster
Players
Coaches

Name	Pos	DOB	Height	Club	Nat	Caps
Zukelwa Cwaba	GK, GD	15 October 1984 (aged 30)	1.87 m (6 ft 2 in)
Maryka Holtzhausen (c)	GA, WA	2 June 1987 (aged 28)	1.81 m (5 ft 11 in)	Loughborough Lightning
Lindie Lombard	GS		–	Gauteng Jaguars
Izette Lubbe	C, WA	12 July 1992 (aged 22)	1.80 m (5 ft 11 in)	Gauteng Jaguars
Phumza Maweni	GK, GD	4 September 1984 (aged 30)	1.87 m (6 ft 2 in)	Loughborough Lightning
Karla Mostert	GD,WD	12 March 1990 (aged 25)	1.81 m (5 ft 11 in)	Free State Crinums
Bongiwe Msomi	WA, C	19 January 1988 (aged 27)	1.66 m (5 ft 5 in)	Kingdom Stars
Precious Mthembu	C, WD	11 July 1984 (aged 30)	1.77 m (5 ft 10 in)	Kingdom Stars
Melissa Myburgh	GS, GA		–	Gauteng Jaguars
Adele Niemand	GK		–	Free State Crinums
Elsje du Plessis			–
Lenize Potgieter	GS, GA	2 May 1994 (aged 21)	1.88 m (6 ft 2 in)	Gauteng Jaguars
Shadine van der Merwe	GD, WD, GK	25 November 1992 (aged 22)	1.79 m (5 ft 10 in)	Gauteng Jaguars
Nokubonga Sibiya	C		–	Kingdom Stars

Head coach

- Norma Plummer

Notes

- (c) – Captain
- (cc) – Co-captain
- (vc) – Vice-captain
- – Injury / maternity leave
- (TRP) – Temporary Replacement Player
Player profiles: Team website
Last updated:
22 October 2024

== Group stage ==
=== Round 1 ===
16 June 2015	Malawi	51–40	Uganda

16 June 2015	South Africa	63–38	Zambia

=== Round 2 ===
17 June 2015	South Africa	43–33	Malawi

17 June 2015	Uganda	59–36	Zambia

=== Round 3 ===
18 June 2015	Malawi	60–34	Zambia

18 June 2015	South Africa	56–39	Uganda

=== Table ===
Pos	Team	P	W	L	D	GF	GA	GD	Pts
1	South Africa	3	3	0	0	162	110	52	6
2	Malawi	3	2	1	0	144	117	27	4
3	Uganda	3	1	2	0	138	143	–5	2
4	Zambia	3	0	3	0	108	182	–74	0

Qualified for Final
Qualified for 3rd/4th place match

== Playoffs ==
=== 3rd v 4th Playoff ===
19 June 2015	Uganda	59–34	Zambia

=== Final ===
19 June 2015	South Africa	40–35	Malawi
