= 2017 Netball Quad Series (January/February) =

International netball series

Tournament details
- Host countries: England; South Africa
- Cities: Durban; Liverpool; London
- Venue(s): Durban International Convention Centre; Echo Arena; The SSE Arena Wembley
- Dates: 28 January–5 February 2017
- Teams: 4
- TV partner(s): Sky Sports (UK/Ireland); Sky Sport (New Zealand); SuperSport (South Africa)

Final positions
- Champions: Australia (3rd title)
- Runners-up: New Zealand
- Third place: England

Tournament statistics
- Matches played: 6

The first 2017 Netball Quad Series was the third Netball Quad Series series. It was co-hosted by England Netball and Netball South Africa. It featured Australia, England, New Zealand and South Africa playing each other in a series of six netball test matches in January and February 2017. It was the first of two Netball Quad Series' played in 2017. The second series was played in August and September. With a team coached by Lisa Alexander and captained by Sharni Layton, Australia won the series, securing the title with a 47–46 win over England. The series was broadcast live on Sky Sports in the United Kingdom and Ireland, on Sky Sport in New Zealand and on SuperSport (South Africa).

== Squads ==
Participating teams and rosters
Australia	England	New Zealand	South Africa
Courtney Bruce; April Brandley; Paige Hadley; Sharni Layton (c); Caitlyn Nevins; Susan Pettitt; Kim Ravaillion; Gabi Simpson; Caitlin Thwaites; Gretel Tippett; Jo Weston; Steph Wood	Ama Agbeze (c); Eleanor Cardwell; Jade Clarke (vc); Beth Cobden; Kadeen Corbin; Jodie Gibson; Natalie Haythornthwaite; Helen Housby; Geva Mentor; Natalie Panagarry; Chelsea Pitman; Rachel Shaw	Gina Crampton; Shannon Francois; Katrina Grant (c); Anna Harrison; Kelly Jury; Bailey Mes; Maria Tutaia (vc); Grace Rasmussen; Te Paea Selby-Rickit; Samantha Sinclair; Jane Watson; Maia Wilson	Erin Burger; Vanes-Mari du Toit; Lindie Lombard; Izette Lubbe; Phumza Maweni; Karla Mostert (vc); Bongiwe Msomi (c); Precious Mthembu; Lenize Potgieter; Juline Rossouw; Renske Stoltz; Zanele Vimbela
Coach: Lisa Alexander	Coach: Tracey Neville	Coach: Janine Southby	Coach: Norma Plummer

== Debuts ==
- On 28 January 2017, Caitlyn Nevins made her senior debut for Australia against New Zealand. Nevins replaced Paige Hadley for the final quarter. At 29, she became the oldest debutante for Australia in forty two years. In the same match, Samantha Sinclair made her senior debut for New Zealand.
- On 28 January 2017, the former Australia international, Chelsea Pitman made her senior debut for England against South Africa.
- On 2 February 2017, Kelly Jury made her senior debut for New Zealand against England.

== Matches ==
=== Round 1 ===
28 January 2017	Australia	57–50	New Zealand	Durban International Convention Centre
15:00	Caitlin Thwaites 34/38 (89%); Susan Pettitt 23/27 (85%)		Bailey Mes 25/27 (93%); Maria Tutaia 25/33 (76%)

28 January 2017	South Africa	55–60	England	Durban International Convention Centre
17:00

=== Round 2 ===
31 January 2017	South Africa	46–62	Australia	Durban International Convention Centre
19:00	Lenize Potgieter 34/39 (87%); Lindie Lombard 9/14 (64%); Vanes-Mari du Toit 3/4 (75%)	Stats	Caitlin Thwaites 34/36 (94%); Gretel Tippett 20/25 (80%); Susan Pettitt 8/8 (100%)

2 February 2017	England	37–61	New Zealand	Echo Arena
19:45	Kadeen Corbin 19/25 (76%); Helen Housby 17/22 (77%); Eleanor Cardwell 1/3 (33%)		Maria Tutaia 32/37 (86%); Te Paea Selby-Rickit 20/21 (95%); Bailey Mes 9/9 (100%)

=== Round 3 ===
5 February 2017	England	46–47	Australia	The SSE Arena Wembley
13:00	Helen Housby 26/33 (79%); Kadeen Corbin 19/28 (68%); Natalie Haythornthwaite 1/2 (50%)	Stats	Susan Pettitt 23/27 (85%); Caitlin Thwaites 16/21 (76%); Gretel Tippett 8/14 (57%)

5 February 2017	New Zealand	70–39	South Africa	The SSE Arena Wembley
15:00	Bailey Mes 28/30 (93%); Maria Tutaia 27/34 (79%); Te Paea Selby-Rickit 11/13 (85%); Maia Wilson 4/6 (67%)		Lenize Potgieter 30/36 (83%); Lindie Lombard 5/8 (63%); Renske Stoltz 4/7 (57%)

== Final table ==
Pos	Team	P	W	L	GF	GA	GD	%	Pts
1	Australia	3	3	0	166	142	+24	116.90%	6
2	New Zealand	3	2	1	181	133	+48	136.09%	4
3	England	3	1	2	143	163	–20	87.73%	2
4	South Africa	3	0	3	140	192	–52	72.92%	0
