= 2016 Netball Quad Series =

International netball series

Tournament details
- Host countries: Australia; New Zealand
- Dates: 27 August–4 September 2016
- Teams: 4
- TV partner(s): Fox Sports (Australia); Sky Sports (UK/Ireland); Sky Sport (New Zealand); SuperSport (South Africa)

Final positions
- Champions: Australia (2nd title)
- Runners-up: New Zealand
- Third place: England

Tournament statistics
- Matches played: 6
- Top scorer(s): Caitlin Bassett; 127/141 (90%)

The 2016 Netball Quad Series was the second Netball Quad Series series. It was co-hosted by Netball Australia and Netball New Zealand. After the one off 2012 Netball Quad Series, the series was relaunched in 2016. It was initially referred to as the International Netball Super Series. It featured Australia, England, New Zealand and South Africa playing each other in a series of six netball test matches in August and September 2016. With a team coached by Lisa Alexander and captained by Clare McMeniman, Australia won the series, securing the title with a 60–55 win against New Zealand. The series was broadcast live on Fox Sports in Australia, on Sky Sports in the United Kingdom and Ireland, on Sky Sport in New Zealand and on SuperSport (South Africa).

== Squads ==
Participating teams and rosters
Australia	England	New Zealand	South Africa
Caitlin Bassett; April Brandley; Sharni Layton; Kristiana Manu'a; Clare McMeniman (c); Natalie Medhurst; Kim Ravaillion; Madi Robinson; Gabi Simpson; Caitlin Thwaites; Liz Watson; Steph Wood	Ama Agbeze (c); Summer Artman; Eleanor Cardwell; Jade Clarke; Beth Cobden; Kadeen Corbin; Stacey Francis; Jodie Gibson; Serena Guthrie; Jo Harten; Helen Housby; Hannah Joseph; Laura Malcolm; Geva Mentor; Natalie Panagarry	Kayla Cullen; Ameliaranne Ekenasio; Shannon Francois; Katrina Grant (c); Phoenix Karaka; Laura Langman; Bailey Mes; Storm Purvis; Grace Rasmussen; Te Paea Selby-Rickit; Jane Watson; Maia Wilson	Erin Burger; Sigrid Burger; Lindie Lombard; Izette Lubbe; Phumza Maweni; Karla Mostert (vc); Bongiwe Msomi (c); Precious Mthembu; Lenize Potgieter; Renske Juanitta Steyn; Renske Stoltz; Zanele Vimbela
Coach: Lisa Alexander	Coach: Tracey Neville	Coach: Janine Southby	Coach: Norma Plummer; Assistant coach: Nicole Cusack

== Debuts and milestones ==
- On 27 August 2016, Kristiana Manu'a and Steph Wood made their senior debuts for Australia against South Africa.
- On 27 August 2016, Te Paea Selby-Rickit and Jane Watson made their senior debuts for New Zealand against England. In the same match, Beth Cobden made her senior debut for England.
- On 31 August 2016, Natalie Panagarry made her senior debut for England against Australia.
- On 4 September 2016, Jade Clarke became the most capped England international netball player of all time as she made her 129th senior appearance against South Africa.

== Matches ==
=== Round 1 ===
27 August 2016	Australia	68–43	South Africa	Vector Arena
5:00 PM	Caitlin Bassett 28/30 (93%); Caitlin Thwaites 23/23 (100%); Natalie Medhurst 12/16 (75%); Steph Wood 5/6 (83%)	Stats	Lenize Potgieter 30/37 (81%); Renske Stoltz 7/11 (64%); Lindie Lombard 6/9 (67%)

27 August 2016	New Zealand	65–39	England	Vector Arena
7:00 PM	Bailey Mes 40/43 (93%); Ameliaranne Ekenasio 23/31 (74%); Te Paea Selby-Rickit 2/3 (67%)		Jo Harten 25/31 (81%); Eleanor Cardwell 5/11 (45%); Kadeen Corbin 6/10 (60%); Helen Housby 3/5 (60%)

=== Round 2 ===
31 August 2016	New Zealand	65–46	South Africa	Claudelands Arena
7:00 PM	Ameliaranne Ekenasio 35/40 (88%); Bailey Mes 30/35 (86%)		Lenize Potgieter 33/38 (87%); Renske Stoltz 11/14 (79%); Lindie Lombard 2/2 (100%)

31 August 2016	Australia	66–46	England	Adelaide Entertainment Centre
8:00pm AEST	Caitlin Bassett 46/51 (90%); Natalie Medhurst 11/13 (85%); Caitlin Thwaites 6/7 (86%); Steph Wood 3/4 (75%)	Stats	Jo Harten 28/34 (82%); Kadeen Corbin 10/14 (71%); Helen Housby 5/6 (83%); Eleanor Cardwell 3/5 (60%)

=== Round 3 ===
4 September 2016	England	57–44	South Africa	Margaret Court Arena
5:00 PM	Jo Harten 38/42 (90%); Kadeen Corbin 18/24 (75%); Helen Housby 1/1 (100%)	Stats	Lenize Potgieter 24/31 (77%); Renske Stoltz 18/26 (69%); Sigrid Burger 2/4 (50%)

4 September 2016	Australia	60–55	New Zealand	Margaret Court Arena
7:00 PM	Caitlin Bassett 53/60 (88%); Natalie Medhurst 7/8 (88%)		Ameliaranne Ekenasio 32/37 (86%); Bailey Mes 23/34 (68%)

== Final table ==
Pos	Team	P	W	L	D	GF	GA	GD	%	Pts
1	Australia	3	3	0	0	194	144	+50	134.72%	6
2	New Zealand	3	2	1	0	185	145	+40	127.59%	4
3	England	3	1	2	0	142	175	–33	81.14%	2
4	South Africa	3	0	3	0	133	190	–57	70.00%	0
