= 2022 SPAR Diamond Challenge =

International netball series hosted by South Africa

Tournament details
- Host country: South Africa
- City: Pretoria
- Venue(s): Rembrandt Hall; University of Pretoria
- Dates: 22–26 November 2022
- Teams: 4
- TV partner(s): SuperSport (South Africa); Recast TV (Scotland)

Final positions
- Champions: South Africa
- Runners-up: Scotland

The 2022 SPAR Diamond Challenge was the seventh Diamond Challenge netball series. It featured South Africa, Scotland and Zimbabwe. Malawi were also due to take part. However, they were replaced by a Netball South Africa President's XII. The series was played in November 2022 at the University of Pretoria's Rembrandt Hall. With a team coached by Norma Plummer and captained by Bongiwe Msomi, South Africa won the series after defeating Scotland 54–36 in the final. South Africa finished the series undefeated, winning all four matches, and Khanyisa Chawane was named the Player of the Tournament. The series was broadcast live on SuperSport in South Africa. All of Scotland's matches were streamed by Recast TV.

== Head coaches and captains ==
Team	Head coach	Captain
South Africa	Norma Plummer	Bongiwe Msomi
Scotland	Tamsin Greenway	Claire Maxwell
Zimbabwe	Ropafadzo Matsauki	Felisitus Kwangwa
(South Africa) President's XII	Sameshia Esau	Jeanté Strydom

== Umpires ==
Umpire	Association
Chakatsa Lephole	Lesotho
Leonard Masao	South Africa
Ken Metekingi	New Zealand
Terrence Peart	Jamaica
Theresa Prince	South Africa

== Group stage ==
=== Round 1 ===
22 November 2022	South Africa	61–42	Scotland
14:00

22 November 2022	(South Africa) President's XII	55–50	Zimbabwe
16:00

=== Round 2 ===
23 November 2022	South Africa	72–37	Zimbabwe
14:00

23 November 2022	(South Africa) President's XII	49–48	Scotland
16:00

=== Round 3 ===
25 November 2022	Scotland	41–41	Zimbabwe
12:00

25 November 2022	South Africa	59–34	(South Africa) President's XII
14:00

=== Table ===
Pos	Team	P	W	L	D	GF	GA	GD	Pts
1	South Africa	3	3	0	0	192	119	73	6
2	(South Africa) President's XII ^{(Note 1)}	3	2	1	0	138	157	–19	4
3	Scotland ^{(Note 2)}	3	0	2	1	131	151	–20	1
4	Zimbabwe	3	0	2	1	128	168	–40	1

Qualified for Final
Qualified for 3rd/4th place match

Notes

- ^1 The President's XII were ineligible to qualify for the final.
- ^2 Scotland qualified for the final because of their better goal difference.

== Playoffs ==
=== 3rd v 4th Playoff ===
26 November 2022	(South Africa) President's XII	49–43	Zimbabwe
14:00

=== Final ===
26 November 2022	South Africa	54–36	Scotland
16:00

Teams

Head Coach: Norma Plummer; Assistant coach: Dumisani Chauke Starting 7: GS Lenize Potgieter; GA Nomfundo Mngomezulu; WA Bongiwe Msomi (c); C Refiloe Nketsa; WD Shadine van der Merwe; GD Zanele Vimbela; GK Phumza Maweni Squad: WA, C, WD Khanyisa Chawane; C, WA Izette Griesel; GD, WD Boitumelo Mahloko; GD, WD Monique Reyneke-Meyer; GD, GK Nicola Smith; GA, WA Nicholé Taljaard; GS, GA Elmeré van der Berg; GS, GA Ine-Marí Venter	Head Coach: Tamsin Greenway; Assistant coach: Karen Atkinson Starting 7: GS Emma Barrie; GA Niamh McCall; WA Iona Christian; C Hannah Leighton; WD Claire Maxwell (c); GD Emily Nicholl (vc); GK Rachel Conway Squad: WA, C Kelly Boyle; GS, GA Cerys Cairns; GD, GK Cerys Finn; WA, GA Emma Love; GD, WD Sarah MacPhail; GS, GA Kalea Stagg

== Final Placings ==
Rank	Team
1	South Africa
2	Scotland
3	(South Africa) President's XII
4	Zimbabwe

== Award winners ==
Award	Winner	Team
Player of the Tournament	Khanyisa Chawane	South Africa
Best Shooter	Ine-Marí Venter	South Africa
Best Mid Court	Iona Christian	Scotland
Best Defender	Phumza Maweni	South Africa
