= Precious Mthembu =

South Africa netball international

Personal information
- Full name: Precious Mthembu
- Born: 11 July 1984 (age 42) Durban, KwaZulu-Natal
- Height: 1.77 m (5 ft 9 1/2 in)
- School: Danville Park Girls' High School

Netball career
- Playing positions: C, WD
Years	Club team	Apps
2009	Mermaids	
2014–2021	Kingdom Stars	
2017–2023	Gilbert Stars	
Years	National team	Caps
2007–20xx	South Africa	97
Coaching career
- Years: Team
- 2024: South Africa U20, U21
- 2022: Kingdom Queens
- 2023–: Kingdom Stars

Precious Mthembu (born 11 July 1984) is a former South Africa netball international and current netball coach. Mthembu made 97 senior appearances for South Africa. She represented South Africa at the 2007 and 2015 Netball World Cups and at the 2010, 2014 and 2018 Commonwealth Games. She captained South Africa at the 2011 All-Africa Games. Mthembu also played for Kingdom Stars in the Premier Netball League. She captained Stars between 2019 and 2021. In 2015 and 2019, she was a members of the Stars teams that won Division Two Shield titles. In 2024, as a head coach, she guided South Africa to victory in a Netball World Youth Cup qualifying tournament and Kingdom Stars to a Division Two Shield title.

== Early life, family and education ==
Mthembu was born and raised in Durban, KwaZulu-Natal. She grew up in the Waterloo suburb and attended Virginia Preparatory School and Danville Park Girls High School. She later returned to the latter school to work as a Zulu language teacher and netball coach.

== Playing career ==
=== Kingdom Stars ===
Between 2014 and 2021, Mthembu played for Kingdom Stars in the Premier Netball League. She captained Stars between 2019 and 2021. Her early team mates at Stars included Bongiwe Msomi. In 2015, Mthembu and Msomi were members of the Stars team that won the Division Two Shield. In 2019, Mthembu captained Stars as they won the Division Two Shield and gained promotion to Division One after winning a promotion/relegation play off. In 2020, she captained Stars as they retained their position in Division One after winning the promotion/relegation play off.

=== Gilbert Stars ===
Between 2017 and 2021, as either a player and/or coach with Gilbert Stars, Mthembu, won five consecutive titles in KwaZulu-Natal's Netball Super League. In 2023, Mthembu was still an active player with Gilbert Stars.

=== South Africa ===
On 26 January 2007, Mthembu made her senior debut for South Africa during an away series against England. She subsequently represented South Africa at the 2007 World Netball Championships. In 2009 she became South Africa vice captain. She represented South Africa at the 2010 Commonwealth Games and captained South Africa at the 2011 All-Africa Games. She went onto represent South Africa at the 2014 Commonwealth Games and 2015 Netball World Cup. On 3 September 2017, Mthembu was a member of the first South Africa team to win a Netball Quad Series match when they defeated England 54–51. At the 2018 Commonwealth Games she made her third appearance in the tournament. However, during the tournament she suffered an ACL injury in a match against Australia. She later made a comeback at the 2019 Africa Netball Cup. In May 2022, Mthembu announced her retirement from international netball. She finished her career with 97 senior appearances, the most by any wing defence in South Africa and the fourth most by any South Africa netball international.

Tournaments	Place
2007 World Netball Championships	6th
2010 Commonwealth Games	6th
2011 All-Africa Games	6th
2011 World Netball Series	5th
2012 Diamond Challenge	1st
2013 African Netball Championship	1st
2014 Commonwealth Games	6th
2014 Fast5 Netball World Series	5th
2015 Netball Europe Open Championships	2nd place, silver medalist(s)
2015 Diamond Challenge	1st
2015 Taini Jamison Trophy Series	2nd
2015 Netball World Cup	5th
2016 Netball Quad Series	4th
2016 Diamond Challenge	1st
2017 Netball Quad Series (January/February)	4th
2017 Netball Quad Series (August/September)	4th
2018 Netball Quad Series (January)	4th
2018 Commonwealth Games	5th
2019 Africa Netball Cup	1st

== Coaching career ==
=== South Africa ===
In December 2021, Mthembu was head coach of a South Africa under-20 team that won a regional youth tournament. She also served as an assistant coach to both Elsje Jordaan and Jenny van Dyk with the South Africa under-21 team. In March 2024 she succeeded the latter as the under-21 coach after she was appointed head coach of the senior South Africa team. She subsequently guided South Africa to victory in a 2025 Netball World Youth Cup qualifying tournament. Her assistant coach was Phumza Maweni.

=== Kingdom Queens ===
During the 2022 Telkom Netball League season, Mthembu served as head coach of Kingdom Queens.

=== Kingdom Stars ===
Since 2023, Mthembu has served as head coach of Kingdom Stars. In 2024, she guided Stars to victory in the Division Two Shield. Mthembu has now won the title as both player and coach.

== Honours ==
=== Player ===
South Africa

- Africa Netball Cup
  - Winners: 2013, 2019
- Diamond Challenge
  - Winners: 2012, 2015, 2016
- Netball Europe Open Championships
  - Runners Up: 2015

Kingdom Stars

- Division Two Shield
  - Winners: 2015, 2019

=== Coach ===
South Africa

- Netball World Youth Cup qualification
  - Winners: 2025

Kingdom Stars

- Division Two Shield
  - Winners: 2024
