= 2016 Diamond Challenge =

International netball series hosted by South Africa

Tournament details
- Host country: South Africa
- City: Durban
- Venue(s): Westville Campus; University of KwaZulu-Natal
- Dates: 2–5 October 2016
- Teams: 4
- TV partner: SuperSport (South Africa)

Final positions
- Champions: South Africa
- Runners-up: Zimbabwe
- Third place: Uganda

The 2016 Diamond Challenge was the fourth Diamond Challenge netball series. It featured South Africa, Uganda, Zimbabwe and a Netball South Africa President's XII. The series was played in October 2016 at the Westville Campus of the University of KwaZulu-Natal. With a team coached by Norma Plummer and captained by Bongiwe Msomi, South Africa won the series. South Africa finished the series undefeated, winning all four matches. In the final they defeated Zimbabwe 68–34. Zimbabwe, 21st in the World Netball Rankings, qualified for the final and caused an upset when they beat Uganda, ranked 8th, 42–39 in their final group stage match. The series was broadcast live on SuperSport in South Africa.

== Head coaches and captains ==
Team	Head coach	Captain
South Africa	Norma Plummer	Bongiwe Msomi
Uganda	Rashid Mubiru	Irene Eyaru
Zimbabwe		Perpetua Siyachitema
(South Africa) President's XII		Elsunet du Plessis

== South Africa squad ==
South Africa roster
Players
Coaches

Name	Pos	DOB	Height	Club	Nat	Caps
Erin Burger	C, WA, WD	10 February 1987 (aged 29)	1.76 m (5 ft 9 in)	Southern Stings
Sigrid Burger	GA, GS	23 February 1996 (aged 20)	1.90 m (6 ft 3 in)	North West Flames
Izette Lubbe	C, WA	12 July 1992 (aged 24)	1.80 m (5 ft 11 in)	Gauteng Jaguars
Phumza Maweni	GK, GD	4 September 1984 (aged 32)	1.87 m (6 ft 2 in)	Kingdom Stars
Karla Mostert (vc)	GD,WD	12 March 1990 (aged 26)	1.81 m (5 ft 11 in)	Free State Crinums
Bongiwe Msomi (c)	WA, C	19 January 1988 (aged 28)	1.66 m (5 ft 5 in)	Kingdom Stars
Precious Mthembu	C, WD	11 July 1984 (aged 32)	1.77 m (5 ft 10 in)	Kingdom Stars
Lenize Potgieter	GS, GA	2 May 1994 (aged 22)	1.88 m (6 ft 2 in)	Gauteng Jaguars
Juline Rossouw	GD	3 January 1992 (aged 24)	1.80 m (5 ft 11 in)
Renske Stoltz	GA, GS	19 April 1994 (aged 22)	1.69 m (5 ft 7 in)	North West Flames
Vanes-Mari du Toit	GK, GS	2 August 1989 (aged 27)	1.89 m (6 ft 2 in)	Yorkshire Jets
Zanele Vimbela	GD, GK	28 April 1989 (aged 27)	1.80 m (5 ft 11 in)	Eastern Cape Aloes

Head coach

- Norma Plummer

Notes

- (c) – Captain
- (cc) – Co-captain
- (vc) – Vice-captain
- – Injury / maternity leave
- (TRP) – Temporary Replacement Player
Player profiles: Team website
Last updated:
22 October 2024

== Group stage ==
=== Round 1 ===
2 October 2016	(South Africa) President's XII	55–50	Uganda
16:00

2 October 2016	South Africa	70–35	Zimbabwe
18:00

=== Round 2 ===
3 October 2016	South Africa	59–27	Uganda
18:00

3 October 2016	(South Africa) President's XII	57–32	Zimbabwe
20:00

=== Round 3 ===
4 October 2016	Zimbabwe	42–39	Uganda

4 October 2016	South Africa	56–35	(South Africa) President's XII

=== Table ===
Pos	Team	P	W	L	D	GF	GA	GD	Pts
1	South Africa	3	3	0	0	185	97	88	6
2	(South Africa) President's XII ^{(Note 1)}	3	2	1	0	147	138	9	4
3	Zimbabwe	3	1	2	0	109	160	–51	2
4	Uganda	3	0	0	3	116	153	–37	1

Qualified for Final
Qualified for 3rd/4th place match

Notes

- ^1 Although the President's XII won more group stage matches, as an unranked team they are not allowed to play in the final of an official tournament.

== Playoffs ==
=== 3rd v 4th Playoff ===
5 October 2016	(South Africa) President's XII	54–54	Uganda

=== Final ===
5 October 2016	South Africa	68–34	Zimbabwe

== Final Placings ==
Rank	Team
1	South Africa
2	Zimbabwe
3	Uganda
3	(South Africa) President's XII
