= 2018 Diamond Challenge =

International netball series hosted by South Africa

Tournament details
- Host country: South Africa
- Cities: Seshego, Polokwane
- Venue: Ngoako Ramathlodi Sports Complex
- Dates: 27 November–1 December 2018
- Teams: 6
- TV partner: SuperSport (South Africa)

Final positions
- Champions: South Africa
- Runners-up: Zambia
- Third place: Zimbabwe

The 2018 Diamond Challenge was the fifth Diamond Challenge netball series. It featured South Africa, Botswana, Namibia, Zambia, Zimbabwe and a Netball South Africa President's XII. The series was played in late November and early December 2018 at Seshego's Ngoako Ramathlodi Sports Complex. With a team coached by Norma Plummer and captained by Bongiwe Msomi, South Africa won the series. South Africa finished the series undefeated, winning all five matches, and Msomi was named the Player of the Tournament. The series was broadcast live on SuperSport in South Africa.

== Head coaches and captains ==
Team	Head coach	Captain
South Africa	Norma Plummer	Bongiwe Msomi
Botswana		Tumisang Bagidi
Namibia		
Zambia		Elizabeth Bwalya
Zimbabwe	Lloyd Makunde	
(South Africa) President's XII	Jenny van Dyk	Jessica Khomo

== South Africa squad ==
South Africa roster
Players
Coaches

Name	Pos	DOB	Height	Club	Nat	Caps
Erin Burger	C, WA, WD	10 February 1987 (aged 31)	1.76 m (5 ft 9 in)	Gauteng Jaguars		108
Sigrid Burger	GA, GS	23 February 1996 (aged 22)	1.90 m (6 ft 3 in)	Surrey Storm
Khanyisa Chawane	WD,C,WA	14 January 1996 (aged 22)	1.67 m (5 ft 6 in)
Rome Dreyer	C	28 April 1994 (aged 24)	1.70 m (5 ft 7 in)
Maryka Holtzhausen (c)	GA, WA	2 June 1987 (aged 31)	1.81 m (5 ft 11 in)	Severn Stars		99
Phumza Maweni	GK, GD	4 September 1984 (aged 34)	1.87 m (6 ft 2 in)	Severn Stars
Bongiwe Msomi	WA, C	19 January 1988 (aged 30)	1.66 m (5 ft 5 in)	Surrey Storm
Karla Pretorius (vc)	GD,WD	12 March 1990 (aged 28)	1.81 m (5 ft 11 in)	Sunshine Coast Lightning
Lenize Potgieter	GS, GA	2 May 1994 (aged 24)	1.88 m (6 ft 2 in)	Waikato Bay of Plenty Magic		49
Renske Stoltz	GA, GS	19 April 1994 (aged 24)	1.69 m (5 ft 7 in)	Wasps Netball
Shadine van der Merwe	GD, WD, GK	25 November 1992 (aged 26)	1.79 m (5 ft 10 in)	Surrey Storm
Zanele Vimbela	GD, GK	28 April 1989 (aged 29)	1.80 m (5 ft 11 in)	Team Bath

Head coach

- Norma Plummer

Notes

- (c) – Captain
- (cc) – Co-captain
- (vc) – Vice-captain
- – Injury / maternity leave
- (TRP) – Temporary Replacement Player
Player profiles: Team website
Last updated: 22 October 2024

== Milestones ==
- On 27 November 2018, Maryka Holtzhausen made her 100th senior appearance for South Africa against Namibia.
- On 27 November 2018, Lenize Potgieter made her 50th senior appearance for South Africa against Namibia.

== Matches ==
=== Round 1 ===
27 November 2018	South Africa	78–28	Namibia

27 November 2018	Zimbabwe	43–30	Botswana

27 November 2018	(South Africa) President's XII	48–46	Zambia

=== Round 2 ===
28 November 2018	Zambia	57–51	Zimbabwe

28 November 2018	(South Africa) President's XII	61–31	Namibia

28 November 2018	South Africa	83–16	Botswana

=== Round 3 ===
29 November 2018	South Africa	62–35	(South Africa) President's XII
15:00

29 November 2018	Zambia	58–42	Botswana
17.00

29 November 2018	Zimbabwe	62–43	Namibia
19.00

=== Round 4 ===
30 November 2018	Botswana	55–48	Namibia

30 November 2018	(South Africa) President's XII	58–34	Zimbabwe

30 November 2018	South Africa	57–36	Zambia

=== Round 5 ===
The Round 5 matches were all be re-scheduled to avoid a clash with the 2018 Women's Africa Cup of Nations final between South Africa and Nigeria.

1 December 2018	(South Africa) President's XII	58–35	Botswana
12:00

1 December 2018	Zambia	68–36	Namibia
14:00

1 December 2018	South Africa	73–44	Zimbabwe
16:00

== Final table ==
Pos	Team	P	W	L	D	GF	GA	GD	Pts
1	South Africa	5	5	0	0	353	119	234	10
2	(South Africa) President's XII ^{(Note 1)}	5	4	1	0	260	208	52	8
3	Zambia	5	3	2	0	265	234	31	6
4	Zimbabwe	5	2	3	0	234	261	–27	4
5	Botswana	5	1	4	0	178	290	–112	2
6	Namibia	5	0	5	0	186	324	–138	0

Notes

- ^1 Some sources credit Zambia with second place.

== Award winners ==
Award	Winner	Team
Player of the Tournament	Bongiwe Msomi	South Africa
Best Shooter	Diana Banda	Zambia
Best Mid Court	Rome Dreyer	South Africa
Best Defender	Phumza Maweni	South Africa
