= 2012 Diamond Challenge =

International netball series hosted by South Africa

Tournament details
- Host country: South Africa
- City: Pretoria
- Venue: Heartfelt Arena
- Dates: 15–18 August 2012
- Teams: 4
- TV partner: SuperSport (South Africa)

Final positions
- Champions: South Africa
- Runners-up: Malawi
- Third place: Botswana

The 2012 Diamond Challenge was the inaugural Diamond Challenge netball series. It featured South Africa, Botswana, Malawi and Zambia. The series was played in August 2012 at Pretoria's Heartfelt Arena. Malawi won the group stage of the series, winning all three matches, including defeating South Africa 47–42 in their third match. However, it was South Africa who won the overall series, after they defeated Malawi 47–43 in the final. The series was broadcast live on SuperSport in South Africa.

== Head coaches and captains ==
| Team | Head coach | Captain |
|---|---|---|
| South Africa | Elize Kotze | Zanele Mdodana |
| Botswana | | Kagisano Mawela |
| Malawi | Griffin Saenda | Grace Mwafulirwa |
| Zambia | | Annie Mukamba |

== Group stage ==
=== Round 1 ===
| 15 August 2012 | Malawi | 75–32 | Zambia |
| 18:15 |

| 15 August 2012 | South Africa | 55–26 | Botswana |
| 19:45 |

=== Round 2 ===
| 16 August 2012 | Malawi | 63–29 | Botswana |
| 18:00 |

| 16 August 2012 | South Africa | 47–34 | Zambia |
| 19:45 | Lucy Jere 22/26 (85%) | | Melissa Myburgh 34/43 (79%) |

=== Round 3 ===
| 17 August 2012 | Botswana | 59–41 | Zambia |
| 18:00 |

| 17 August 2012 | South Africa | 42–47 | Malawi |
| 19:45 |

== Final table ==
| Pos | Team | P | W | L | D | GF | GA | GD | Pts |
|---|---|---|---|---|---|---|---|---|---|
| 1 | Malawi | 3 | 3 | 0 | 0 | 185 | 103 | 82 | 6 |
| 2 | South Africa | 3 | 2 | 1 | 0 | 144 | 107 | 37 | 4 |
| 3 | Botswana | 3 | 1 | 2 | 0 | 114 | 159 | –45 | 1 |
| 4 | Zambia | 3 | 0 | 3 | 0 | 107 | 181 | –74 | 1 |

Qualified for Final
Qualified for 3rd/4th place match

== Playoffs ==
=== 3rd v 4th Playoff ===
| 18 August 2012 | Botswana | 45–36 | Zambia |
| 12:00 |

=== Final ===
| 18 August 2012 | South Africa | 47–43 | Malawi |
| 13:40 | | | Mwai Kumwenda 39/41 (95%) |

Teams

| Head Coach: Elize Kotze Starting 7: GS Chrisna Bootha; GA Maryka Holtzhausen; WA Zanele Mdodana (c); C Thuli Qegu; WD Bongiwe Msomi; GD Karla Mostert; GK Vanes-Mari du Toit Squad: WD, C Nosiphiwo Goda; C, WD Precious Mthembu; GS, GA Melissa Myburgh; WD, GK Adele Niemand; GD Anneret Viljoen | Head Coach: Griffin Saenda Starting 7: GS Mwai Kumwenda; GA Sindi Simtowe; WA Beatrice Mpinganjira; C Bridget Kumwenda; WD Grace Mwafulirwa (c); GD Caroline Mtukule; GK Towera Vinkhumbo Squad: C, WA Thandie Mwale Galleta; GD, WD Joanna Kachilika; GS Tina Kamuyambeni; GD, WD Joyce Mvula; GD, GK Loreen Ngwira |

== Award winners ==
| Award | Winner | Team |
|---|---|---|
| Player of the Tournament | Mwai Kumwenda | Malawi |
