= 2020 South Africa Malawi netball series =

Tournament details
- Host country: South Africa
- Cities: Sun City, Rustenburg
- Dates: 26–29 November 2020
- TV partner: SuperSport

Final positions
- Champions: South Africa
- Runners-up: Malawi

Tournament statistics
- Matches played: 3

The 2020 South Africa Malawi netball series saw South Africa host Malawi in November 2020 for a three-match series. The series was won by South Africa, who won all three of the matches.

== Squads ==
South Africa vs. Malawi
South Africa	Malawi
Sigrid Burger; Khanyisa Chawane; Izette Griesel; Rome Joubert; Kamogelo Maseko; Phumza Maweni; Tshina Mdau; Sikholiwe Mdletshe; Bongiwe Msomi (Captain); Lenize Potgieter; Lefebre Rademan; Monique Reyneke; Nicola Smith; Shadine van der Merwe; Ine-Mari Venter	Caroline Mtukule (Captain); Towera Vinkhumbo; Martha Dambo; Grace Mwafulirwa; Juliet Sambo; Beauty Basiyao; Maggie Sikwese; Takondwa Iwazi; Bridget Kumwenda; Thandie Galeta; Beatrice Mpinganjira; Sindie Simtowe; Jesca Mazengera; Tendai Masamba; Mary Nyirenda

== Matches ==
=== First test ===
26 November; 7:00 pm	Report	South Africa	65–25	Malawi
26 November; 7:00 pm	Report	Scoring by quarter: 15-6, 16-3, 17-7, 17-9
26 November; 7:00 pm	Report	Venter 28/30 (93%); Potgieter 19/21 (90%); Rademan 15/17 (88%); Maseko 3/4 (75%)		Simtowe 14/22 (64%); Mazengera 4/5 (80%); Masamba 4/6 (67%); Nyirenda 3/3 (100%)

=== Second test ===
28 November; 9:00 pm	Report	South Africa	62–29	Malawi
28 November; 9:00 pm	Report	Scoring by quarter: 18-7, 17-8, 16-6, 11-8

=== Third test ===
29 November; 1:00 pm	Report	South Africa	69–28	Malawi
29 November; 1:00 pm	Report	Scoring by quarter: 14-9, 22-7, 20-4, 13-8
