= Elize Kotze =

South African netball player and coach

Personal information

Netball career
Years	National team	Caps
199x–199x	South Africa	
Coaching career
- Years: Team
- 2000: South Africa
- 2004–2011: UP-Tuks
- 2011–2015: South Africa
Medal record
Representing South Africa
World Netball Championships
Silver medal – second place	1995 Birmingham	Team

Elize Kotze is a former South Africa netball international and national team head coach. As a player she was member of the South Africa team that were silver medallists at the 1995 World Netball Championships. As a head coach she took charge of South Africa at the 2011 World Netball Championships and 2014 Commonwealth Games.

== Playing career ==
=== Early years ===
In her youth, Elize Kotze excelled in track and field and gymnastics, as well as netball. She captained the Northern Transvaal High Schools in netball. After school, she captained the Gauteng North senior team and in 1994 was voted best defender in the country.

=== South Africa ===
Kotze, was vice captain of the South Africa team that won the silver medal at 1995 World Netball Championships. Her team mates included Irene van Dyk. During the tournament they defeated both England and New Zealand before losing in the final to Australia.

== Coaching career ==
=== UP Tuks ===
Between 2004 and 2011, Kotze served as head coach at UP-Tuks Netball. During this time she coached and mentored several notable future South Africa netball internationals, including Erin Burger, Chrisna Bootha, Amanda Mynhardt and Vanes-Mari du Toit. She also mentored Jenny van Dyk, one of her successors as South Africa head coach.

=== South Africa ===
In November 2000, Kotze coached a South Africa team that played in a Tri-Nations Netball Series against New Zealand and Australia.

Between 2011 and 2015, Kotze served as head coach of South Africa. At the 2011 World Netball Championships she guided South Africa to fifth place after defeating Malawi in the play-off. Highlights of her time in charge included South Africa defeating Jamaica in a test match for the first time in 28 years and winning the 2013 African Netball Championship. At the 2014 Commonwealth Games she guided South Africa to sixth place. In January 2015, she resigned as South Africa head coach, citing personal reasons beyond her control. One of Kotze's son was critically ill at the time and spent time in intensive care.

Tournaments	Place
2000 Tri-Nations Netball Series	3rd
2011 World Netball Championships	5th
2011 World Netball Series	5th
2012 Diamond Challenge	1st
2012 Netball Quad Series	4th
2013 African Netball Championship	1st
2013 Diamond Challenge	1st
2014 Commonwealth Games	6th
2014 Fast5 Netball World Series	5th

== Family ==
Kotze is married to Martin. They have two sons, Christoph and Altus. Since 2001, Kotze and her husband have run the Raloka Netball Ranch, a training facility on their property, near Pretoria.

== Honours ==
=== Player ===
South Africa

- World Netball Championships
  - Runners Up: 1995

=== Coach ===
South Africa

- African Netball Championship
  - Winners: 2013
- Diamond Challenge
  - Winners: 2012, 2013
