= Marlize de Bruin =

South African netball and rugby sevens player

Personal information
- Born: 11 November 1994 (age 32) Pretoria, South Africa
- Height: 1.70 m (5 ft 7 in)
- Relative: Luan de Bruin (brother)
- School: Afrikaanse Hoër Meisieskool
- University: University of Pretoria

Netball career
- Playing positions: C, WA
Years	Club team	Apps
2014–2019	UP-Tuks	
2015–2022	Gauteng Jaguars	
Years	National team	Caps
2016	South Africa	
2016–2021	President's XII	
Medal record
Representing South Africa
World University Netball Championship
Silver medal – second place	2018 Kampala	Team

Marlize de Bruin (born 11 November 1994) is a South African sportswomen. As a netball player, she played for UP-Tuks in Varsity Netball and for Gauteng Jaguars in the Premier Netball League. She also represented the South Africa national netball team at the 2016 Fast5 Netball World Series. As a rugby sevens player, she represented the South Africa women's national rugby sevens team at the 2022 Rugby World Cup Sevens and at the 2024 Summer Olympics.

== Early life, family and education ==
De Bruin was born and raised in Pretoria and attended Afrikaanse Hoër Meisieskool. Between 2015 and 2020, she attended the University of Pretoria where she gained degrees in education and sports management and trained to be a teacher. During her training she worked as a teacher at Afrikaans Hoër Meisieskool and as a netball coach at Pretoria High School for Girls. Her older brother, Luan de Bruin, is a professional rugby union player.

== Netball ==
=== UP Tuks ===
Between 2014 and 2019, de Bruin played for UP-Tuks in Varsity Netball. In the 2016 Varsity final she was named Player of the Match, despite finishing on the losing team. In 2017, together with Shadine van der Merwe and Ine-Marí Venter, she was a member of the first UP Tuks team to win the Varsity title. In 2019 she was vice captain as UP-Tuks won their second title. While playing for UP-Tuks, de Bruin became known as "South Africa's fittest netball player". For the 2021 Varsity Netball competition, de Bruin served as an assistant coach to UP-Tuks head coach, Jenny van Dyk.

=== Gauteng Jaguars ===
Between 2015 and 2022, de Bruin played for Gauteng Jaguars in the Premier Netball League. She was a prominent member of the Jaguars team that won five successive PNL titles between 2017 and 2021. In 2017 and 2018 she also played for Jaguars in the Netball New Zealand Super Club tournaments. In 2018, together with Shadine van der Merwe and Ine-Marí Venter, she was a member of the Jaguars team that defeated Southern Steel, the 2018 ANZ Premiership winners. In 2019 and 2021, de Bruin also served as Jaguars captain. In 2021, she captained Jaguars to their fifth successive league title. She also finished the season as Best Overall Player.

=== South Africa ===
In 2016, 2018 and 2021, de Bruin played for the Netball South Africa President's XII in Diamond Challenge tournaments. In 2021, she captained the President's XII. She has also represented South Africa at Fast5 and university level. She played for South Africa at 2016 Fast5 Netball World Series. She was also a member of the South Africa team that were runners up at the 2018 World University Netball Championship. De Bruin has also been included in senior South Africa training squads. However, she always found herself behind experienced captain Bongiwe Msomi. Ahead of the 2022 Commonwealth Games, Netball South Africa awarded players professional contracts for the first time. De Bruin was one of 24 players to receive a contract.

Tournaments	Place	Team
2016 Diamond Challenge	3rd	(South Africa) President's XII
2016 Fast5 Netball World Series	6th	South Africa
2018 World University Netball Championship	2nd	South Africa
2018 Diamond Challenge	2nd	(South Africa) President's XII
2021 SPAR Challenge Series	3rd	(South Africa) President's XII

== Rugby union ==
Marlize de Bruin
Rugby union career
- Position: Scrum-half
Senior career
Years	Team	Apps	(Points)
2022–	Tuks Women		
2023–	Bulls Daisies		
National sevens team
Years	Team		Comps
2022–	South Africa		

=== Tuks Women ===
In January 2022, de Bruin began training with Tuks Women rugby sevens team. She was subsequently invited to play for the team in various tournaments, including at the Melrose Sevens where she scored three tries.

=== South Africa Sevens ===
Paul Delport, the then head coach of the South Africa women's national rugby sevens team, spotted de Bruin playing for Tuks Women and invited her to training sessions. At the 2022 World Rugby Sevens Challenger Series, she made her senior sevens debut for South Africa and scored a try in a 29–10 win against Papua New Guinea in the 9th place play-off. She finished the tournament with two tries. She went on to represent South Africa at the 2022 Rugby World Cup Sevens. In the 13th place play-off she scored a try against China.

She was a member of the South Africa team that won the 2023 World Rugby Sevens Challenger Series. In the final against Belgium, she scored a try that all but sealed the win. She was also a member of the South Africa team that won the 2023 Africa Women's Sevens, scoring a try in a pool stage 19–0 win against Uganda. This tournament also served as a qualifier for the 2024 Summer Olympics. Together with Kemisetso Baloyi, Liske Lategan, Nadine Roos, Libbie Janse van Rensburg, she was one of five Tuks players selected for the 2024 Summer Olympics.

Tournaments	Place
2022 World Rugby Sevens Challenger Series	9th
2022 Rugby World Cup Sevens	14th
2023 World Rugby Sevens Challenger Series	1st
2023 Africa Women's Sevens	1st
2024 Canada Sevens	12th
2024 Summer Olympics	11th

=== Bulls Daisies ===
Since 2023, de Bruin has been contracted to play for Bulls Daisies.

== Honours ==
=== Netball ===
Gauteng Jaguars

- Telkom Netball League
  - Winners: 2017, 2018, 2019, 2020, 2021

UP-Tuks

- Varsity Netball
  - Winners: 2017, 2019

=== Rugby sevens ===
South Africa

- World Rugby Sevens Challenger Series
  - Winners: 2023
- Africa Women's Sevens
  - Winners: 2023
