= Shadine van der Merwe =

South Africa netball international

Personal information
- Born: 25 November 1992 (age 33) Pretoria, South Africa
- Height: 179 cm (5 ft 10 1/2 in)
- University: University of Pretoria

Netball career
- Playing positions: WD, GD, GK
Years	Club team	Apps
2014–2017	UP-Tuks	
2014–2018	Gauteng Jaguars	
2018–2019	Surrey Storm	
2019–2021	Adelaide Thunderbirds	36
2021–2024	Manchester Thunder	38
2024–	Loughborough Lightning	
Years	National team	Caps
2015–	South Africa	
Medal record
Representing South Africa
World University Netball Championship
Gold medal – first place	2016 Miami	Team

Shadine van der Merwe (born 25 November 1992) is a South Africa netball international. She has represented South Africa at the 2018 and 2022 Commonwealth Games and at the 2019 and 2023 Netball World Cups. In South Africa, she played for UP-Tuks in Varsity Netball and for Gauteng Jaguars in the Brutal Fruit Netball Cup. In 2017 she captained both teams to national titles. She has since played for Surrey Storm, Manchester Thunder and Loughborough Lightning in the Netball Superleague and for Adelaide Thunderbirds in Suncorp Super Netball.

== Early life and education ==
Shadine van der Merwe was born and raised in Pretoria. As well as playing netball, in her youth, she played for the junior South Africa women's national softball team. She also won a bronze medal in the javelin at the 2010 Junior SA Track and Field Championship. After being spotted by netball head coach, Jenny van Dyk, she was offered a scholarship at the University of Pretoria and subsequently earned a Masters in Education. Van der Merwe is an Afrikaans speaker.

== Playing career ==
=== UP Tuks ===
Between 2014 and 2017, van der Merwe played for UP-Tuks in Varsity Netball. In 2014, she was a member of the Tuks team that finished as runners-up to Kovsies. She was also named the Players’ Player of the Varsity Series and named in the Team of the Tournament. Ahead of the 2015 season, she was named Tuks captain. However, in her first match during the season, she suffered a season-ending ACL injury. In 2016, she captained Tuks when they again finished as runners up, this time to Pukke. She was also named the 2016 Player of the Tournament. In 2017, she captained Tuks when they won their first title after defeating Pukke 43–41 in the final.

=== Gauteng Jaguars ===
Between 2014 and 2018, van der Merwe played for Gauteng Jaguars, playing in five successive Brutal Fruit Netball Cup finals. In 2017 and 2018 she captained Jaguars when they won their first two titles. In 2015, 2016 and 2017 she was named Defender of the Tournament. She also played for Jaguars in the 2017 and 2018 Netball New Zealand Super Club tournaments.

=== Surrey Storm ===
Between 2018 and 2019, van der Merwe played for Surrey Storm. Her team mates at Storm included fellow South Africa netball international, Sigrid Burger. She received Storm's 2019 Best and Fairest Award.

=== Adelaide Thunderbirds ===
Between 2019 and 2021, van der Merwe played for Adelaide Thunderbirds, making 36 Suncorp Super Netball appearances. She initially signed for Thunderbirds as a replacement player for the injured Beth Cobden. She made her Thunderbirds debut in a 2019 Round 6 match against Giants. She subsequently became a permanent player in 2020 and a member of the leadership team in 2021. Her team mates at Thunderbirds included fellow South Africa netball international, Lenize Potgieter.

=== Manchester Thunder ===
Between 2021 and 2024, van der Merwe played for Manchester Thunder, making 38 Netball Superleague appearances. She was a member of the Thunder team that won the 2022 title. In 2024, van der Merwe was a member of the Thunder team that finished as runners-up, losing 70–54 to Loughborough Lightning in the grand final.

=== Loughborough Lightning ===
In September 2024, van der Merwe was named as a member the Loughborough Lightning squad for the 2025 Netball Superleague season.

=== South Africa ===
In 2013, van der Merwe was a member of a South Africa Invitational team that won the 2013 Diamond Challenge. In 2015, she made her senior debut for South Africa against Trinidad and Tobago during the 2015 Netball Europe Open Championships. She had previously represented South Africa at under-21 level. However, she missed out on selection for the 2015 Netball World Cup and, after suffering an ACL injury, she struggled to regain her place in the national team. In 2018 she made a comeback and was called up for the January 2018 Netball Quad Series. She subsequently represented South Africa at the 2018 and 2022 Commonwealth Games and at the 2019 and 2023 Netball World Cups. She captained South Africa at the 2018 Fast5 Netball World Series. She was named MVP/Player of the Series for both the 2019 series against England and the 2020 series against Malawi. Ahead of the 2022 Commonwealth Games, Netball South Africa awarded players professional contracts for the first time. Van der Merwe was one of 24 players to receive a contract. At the same tournament, van der Merwe earned her 50th test cap for South Africa in a match against Jamaica.

Tournaments	Place
2013 Diamond Challenge	1st
2014 Fast5 Netball World Series	5th
2015 Netball Europe Open Championships	2nd place, silver medalist(s)
2015 Diamond Challenge	1st
2016 World University Netball Championship	1st
2018 Netball Quad Series (January)	4th
2018 Commonwealth Games	5th
2018 Netball Quad Series (September)	4th
2018 Fast5 Netball World Series	5th
2018 Diamond Challenge	1st
2019 Netball Quad Series	4th
2019 Netball World Cup	4th
2019 Africa Netball Cup	1st
2019 South Africa England netball series	2nd
2020 Netball Nations Cup	4th
2020 South Africa Malawi netball series	1st
2022 Commonwealth Games	6th
2022 SPAR Diamond Challenge	1st
2023 Netball World Cup qualification – Africa	1st
2023 Netball Quad Series	4th
2023 Netball World Cup	4th
2025 Taini Jamison Trophy Series	2nd
2025 Australia South Africa netball series	2nd

== Coaching career ==
In 2024, van der Merwe served as an assistant coach to Erin Burger for UP-Tuks.

== Honours ==
South Africa

- Africa Netball Cup
  - Winners: 2019
- Diamond Challenge
  - Winners: 2013, 2015, 2018, 2022
- World University Netball Championship
  - Winners: 2016
- Netball Europe Open Championships
  - Runners Up: 2015

Manchester Thunder

- Netball Superleague
  - Winners: 2022
  - Runners up: 2024

Gauteng Jaguars

- Brutal Fruit Netball Cup
  - Winners: 2017, 2018
  - Runners up: 2014, 2015, 2016

UP-Tuks

- Varsity Netball
  - Winners: 2017
  - Runners up: 2014, 2016
