= 2015 Taini Jamison Trophy Series =

International netball series

Tournament details
- Host country: New Zealand
- Dates: 23–28 July 2015
- Teams: 3
- TV partner: Sky Sport (New Zealand)

Final positions
- Champions: New Zealand (6th title)
- Runners-up: South Africa

Tournament statistics
- Matches played: 3
- Top scorer(s): Bailey Mes 109/132 (83%)

The 2015 Taini Jamison Trophy Series, also referred to as the New World Series, was the seventh Taini Jamison Trophy series. It featured New Zealand playing Fiji and South Africa in a series of three netball test matches, played in July 2015. New Zealand won all three tests. The New Zealand team were coached by Waimarama Taumaunu and captained by Casey Kopua. South Africa were coached by Norma Plummer and captained by Maryka Holtzhausen. All the teams used the series to prepare for the 2015 Netball World Cup.

== Squads ==
=== New Zealand ===
New Zealand roster
Players
Coaches

Name	Pos	DOB	Height	Club	Nat	Caps
Jodi Brown	GA, GS	6 May 1981 (aged 34)	1.85 m (6 ft 1 in)	Central Pulse
Leana de Bruin	GD, GK	9 July 1977 (aged 38)	1.90 m (6 ft 3 in)	Waikato Bay of Plenty Magic
Kayla Cullen	GD, WD, C	13 February 1992 (aged 23)	1.83 m (6 ft 0 in)	Northern Mystics
Shannon Francois	WA, C, GA	12 October 1990 (aged 24)	1.76 m (5 ft 9 in)	Southern Steel
Katrina Grant	GK, GD, WD	6 May 1987 (aged 28)	1.87 m (6 ft 2 in)	Central Pulse
Phoenix Karaka	GK, GD	6 November 1993 (aged 21)	1.86 m (6 ft 1 in)	Southern Steel
Casey Kopua (c)	GD, GK	19 June 1985 (aged 30)	1.88 m (6 ft 2 in)	Waikato Bay of Plenty Magic
Laura Langman (vc)	C, WD	16 April 1986 (aged 29)	1.73 m (5 ft 8 in)	Northern Mystics
Bailey Mes	GS, GA	27 May 1989 (aged 26)	1.87 m (6 ft 2 in)	Mainland Tactix
Malia Paseka	GS, GA	23 September 1994 (aged 20)	1.83 m (6 ft 0 in)	Waikato Bay of Plenty Magic
Grace Rasmussen	GA, WA	18 March 1988 (aged 27)	1.77 m (5 ft 10 in)	Waikato Bay of Plenty Magic
Maria Tutaia	GA, GS	18 February 1987 (aged 26)	1.88 m (6 ft 2 in)	Northern Mystics

Head coach

- Waimarama Taumaunu

Notes

- (c) – Captain
- (cc) – Co-captain
- (vc) – Vice-captain
- – Injury / maternity leave
- (TRP) – Temporary Replacement Player

Debuts

- Malia Paseka made her senior debut for New Zealand against Fiji.

=== South Africa ===
South Africa roster
Players
Coaches

Name	Pos	DOB	Height	Club	Nat	Caps
Erin Burger	C, WA, WD	10 February 1987 (aged 28)	1.76 m (5 ft 9 in)	Gauteng Jaguars
Maryka Holtzhausen (c)	GA, WA	2 June 1987 (aged 28)	1.81 m (5 ft 11 in)	Loughborough Lightning
Rochelle Lawson	GD		–
Lindie Lombard	GS		–
Izette Lubbe	C, WA	12 July 1992 (aged 23)	1.80 m (5 ft 11 in)	Gauteng Jaguars
Phumza Maweni	GK, GD	4 September 1984 (aged 30)	1.87 m (6 ft 2 in)	Loughborough Lightning
Karla Mostert	GD, WD	12 March 1990 (aged 25)	1.81 m (5 ft 11 in)
Bongiwe Msomi	WA, C	19 January 1988 (aged 27)	1.66 m (5 ft 5 in)	Surrey Storm
Precious Mthembu	C, WD	11 July 1984 (aged 31)	1.77 m (5 ft 10 in)	Kingdom Stars
Adele Niemand	GK		–
Elsje du Plessis			–
Lenize Potgieter	GS, GA	2 May 1994 (aged 21)	1.88 m (6 ft 2 in)

Head coach

- Norma Plummer

Notes

- (c) – Captain
- (cc) – Co-captain
- (vc) – Vice-captain
- – Injury / maternity leave
- (TRP) – Temporary Replacement Player

== Matches ==
=== First test ===
23 July 2015	New Zealand	91–31	Fiji	Te Rauparaha Arena	Sky Sport
23 July 2015	Scoring by quarter: 22–3, 43–12, 70–21, 91–31			Te Rauparaha Arena	Sky Sport
23 July 2015	Bailey Mes 48/57 (84%); Jodi Brown 15/18 (83%); Malia Paseka 14/17 (82%); Maria Tutaia 14/20 (70%)		Afa Rusivakula 14/19 (74%); Taraima Mitchell 12/17 (71%); Maria Lutua 5/6 (83%)	Te Rauparaha Arena	Sky Sport

=== Second test ===
26 July 2015	New Zealand	68–44	South Africa	Claudelands Arena	Sky Sport
26 July 2015	Scoring by quarter: 16–9, 31–24, 52–34, 68–44			Claudelands Arena	Sky Sport
26 July 2015	Bailey Mes 36/43 (84%); Jodi Brown 32/39 (82%)		Lenize Potgieter 39/43 (91%); Maryka Holtzhausen 5/9 (56%)	Claudelands Arena	Sky Sport

=== Third test ===
28 July 2015	New Zealand	67–28	South Africa	The Trusts Arena	Sky Sport
28 July 2015	Scoring by quarter: 15–8, 31–15, 48–24, 67–28			The Trusts Arena	Sky Sport
28 July 2015	Bailey Mes 25/32 (78%); Jodi Brown 16/20 (80%); Maria Tutaia 15/18 (83%); Malia Paseka 11/15 (73%)		Lenize Potgieter 14/18 (78%); Maryka Holtzhausen 11/18 (61%); Lindie Lombard 3/6 (50%)	The Trusts Arena	Sky Sport
