= Erin Burger =

South Africa netball international

Personal information
- Born: 10 February 1987 (age 39) Pretoria, South Africa
- Height: 1.76 m (5 ft 9 1/2 in)
- School: Hoërskool Waterkloof
- University: University of Pretoria

Netball career
- Playing positions: C, WA, WD
Years	Club team	Apps
2006–2012	UP-Tuks	
2007–2010	→ Thunderbirds	
2011	→ Galaxy Blues	
2006–2014	Gauteng North	
2014	Gauteng Golden Fireballs	
2015	Gauteng Jaguars	
2016	Southern Stings	
2017	Western Cape	
2017	Queensland Firebirds	11
2018	Gauteng Jaguars	
2019	SPAR Smileys	
2019	Queensland Firebirds	5
Years	National team	Caps
2007–2019	South Africa	120
Coaching career
- Years: Team
- 2024: UP-Tuks

Erin Burger (born 10 February 1987) is a former South Africa netball international. Between 2007 and 2019, Burger made 120 senior appearances for South Africa. She was the first South Africa netball international to make 100 test appearances. When she retired she was the most capped South Africa netball international. She represented South Africa at the 2010, 2014 and 2018 Commonwealth Games and at the 2007, 2011, 2015 and 2019 Netball World Cups. She was named player of the tournament at the 2011 World Netball Championships.

== Early life and education ==
Burger attended Hoërskool Waterkloof. Between 2007 and 2010, she attended the University of Pretoria, where she gained a BA in Human Movement Sciences and a Post Grade Certificate in Education.

== Playing career ==
=== UP Tuks ===
Between 2006 and 2012, Burger played for UP-Tuks. Her team mates at UP-Tuks included Amanda Mynhardt, Chrisna Bootha and Vanes-Mari du Toit. While playing for UP-Tuks, she represented South Africa at the 2011 World Netball Championships and was named Player of the Tournament.

=== Galaxy Blues ===
In 2011, Burger played for Galaxy Blues in the Netball Grand Series. Her team mates included Amanda Mynhardt, Chrisna Bootha and Vanes-Mari du Toit.

=== SPAR National Netball Championship ===
Burger represented both Gauteng North and Western Cape in Netball South Africa's SPAR National Netball Championship, winning several titles. In both 2010 and 2011 she named player of the tournament. In 2011 she captained Gauteng North when they won the title. She was also a member of the 2014 Gauteng North winning team. In 2016 she captained Western Cape when they won the title.

=== Premier Netball League ===
Between 2014 and 2019, Burger played for several teams in the Premier Netball League. In 2014 she played for Gauteng Golden Fireballs, in 2015 for Gauteng Jaguars and in 2016 for Southern Stings. In 2018, she was a member of the Jaguars team that won the PNL title. In 2019 she played for SPAR Smileys.

=== Queensland Firebirds ===
In 2017 and 2019, Burger played for Queensland Firebirds in Suncorp Super Netball. She first joined Firebirds as a replacement for Mahalia Cassidy. On 3 March 2017, she made her senior debut for Firebirds in a Round 3 match against West Coast Fever. She was subsequently named in the Team of the Week. After the Round 4 match against New South Wales Swifts she was named MVP. In 2019, she re-joined Firebirds, again as a replacement for Cassidy.

=== South Africa ===
In 2005 and 2006, Burger represented South Africa at under-18 and under-20 levels. In January 2007, aged 19, she made her senior debut in an away series against England. Between 2007 and 2019, Burger made 120 senior appearances for South Africa. She represented South Africa at the 2007, 2011, 2015 and 2019 Netball World Cups. She was named Player of the Tournament at the 2011 World Netball Championships. She also represented South Africa at the 2010, 2014 and 2018 Commonwealth Games. During the first 2018 Netball Quad Series, she became the first South Africa netball international to make 100 test appearances. On 25 January 2018, she made her 100th senior appearance in a match against New Zealand. When she retired she was the most capped South Africa netball international.

Tournaments	Place
2007 World Netball Championships	6th
2010 Commonwealth Games	6th
2010 World Netball Series	6th
2011 World Netball Championships	5th
2011 World Netball Series	5th
2013 African Netball Championship	1st
2014 Commonwealth Games	6th
2015 Netball Europe Open Championships	2nd
2015 Taini Jamison Trophy Series	2nd
2015 Netball World Cup	5th
2016 Netball Quad Series	4th
2016 Diamond Challenge	1st
2017 Netball Quad Series (January/February)	4th
2017 Netball Quad Series (August/September)	4th
2018 Netball Quad Series (January)	4th
2018 Commonwealth Games	5th
2018 Diamond Challenge	1st
2019 Netball Quad Series	4th
2019 Netball World Cup	4th

== Coaching career ==
=== UP Tuks ===
Between 2017 and 2018, Burger served as an assistant coach to Jenny van Dyk at UP-Tuks. In 2018 she took charge of UP-Tuks, when van Dyk was away with Gauteng Jaguars at the 2018 Netball New Zealand Super Club tournament. In 2023 she again served as an assistant coach to van Dyk at UP-Tuks. In 2024, after van Dyk was appointed South Africa head coach, Burger replaced her as UP-Tuks head coach.

=== Gauteng Jaguars ===
In 2022, Burger served as an assistant coach to Rozanne Matthyse at Gauteng Jaguars.

=== South Africa ===
At the 2022, 2023 and 2024 Fast5 Netball World Series', Burger served as assistant coach to Martha Mosoahle-Samm. At the 2022 tournament they guided South Africa to a silver medal.

== Honours ==
South Africa

- African Netball Championships
  - Winners: 2013
- Diamond Challenge
  - Winners: 2016, 2018

Gauteng Jaguars

- Premier Netball League
  - Winners: 2018
  - Runners up: 2015
