= 2022 Netball Quad Series =

International netball series

Tournament details
- Host country: England
- City: London
- Venue: Copper Box Arena
- Dates: 15–19 January 2022
- Teams: 4
- TV partner(s): Foxtel/Kayo Freebies (Australia); Sky Sports (UK/Ireland); Sky Sport (New Zealand)

Final positions
- Champions: Australia (7th title)
- Runners-up: England
- Third place: New Zealand

Tournament statistics
- Matches played: 8
- Top scorer(s): Ine-Marí Venter; 134/146 (92%)

The 2022 Netball Quad Series was the eighth Netball Quad Series series. It was hosted by England Netball. It featured Australia, England, New Zealand and South Africa playing each other in a series of eight netball test matches in January 2022. All eight matches were played at London's Copper Box Arena.

With a team coached by Stacey Marinkovich and captained by Liz Watson, Australia won the series, defeating England by 58–46 in the final. Australia's Gretel Bueta was also named Player of the Series. The series was broadcast live on Foxtel/Kayo Freebies in Australia, on Sky Sports and Sky Sports YouTube in the United Kingdom and Ireland and on Sky Sport in New Zealand.

== Squads ==
Participating teams and rosters
Australia	England	New Zealand	South Africa
Sunday Aryang; Ash Brazill; Courtney Bruce; Gretel Bueta; Sophie Dwyer; Sophie Garbin; Paige Hadley; Kate Moloney; Jamie-Lee Price; Sarah Klau; Cara Koenen; Maddy Turner; Liz Watson (c); Jo Weston; Steph Wood (vc)	Imogen Allison; Eleanor Cardwell; Jade Clarke; Beth Cobden; Sophie Drakeford-Lewis; George Fisher; Stacey Francis-Bayman; Layla Guscoth; Serena Guthrie (c); Helen Housby; Laura Malcolm; Natalie Metcalf; Geva Mentor; Eboni Usoro-Brown	Karin Burger; Gina Crampton (c); Sulu Fitzpatrick; Kayla Johnson; Kelly Jury; Phoenix Karaka; Claire Kersten; Tiana Metuarau; Grace Nweke; Mila Reuelu-Buchanan; Shannon Saunders; Filda Vui; Maia Wilson; Sam Winders	Sigrid Burger; Khanyisa Chawane; Jessica du Plessis; Izette Griesel; Phumza Maweni; Bongiwe Msomi (c); Tshinakaho Mdau; Simone Rabie; Lefébre Rademan; Monique Reyneke; Nicola Smith; Elmere van der Berg; Ine-Marí Venter; Zanele Vimbela
Coach: Stacey Marinkovich	Coach: Jess Thirlby	Coach: Noeline Taurua	Coach: Dorette Badenhorst

Notes

- ^1 Jo Harten was included in the original England squad. However she withdrew after testing positive for COVID-19.

== Debuts and milestones ==
- On 15 January 2022, Geva Mentor made her 150th senior appearance for England in the Round 1 match against South Africa.
- On 16 January 2022, Sunday Aryang made her senior debut for Australia in the Round 2 match against South Africa. She became the first African-born player to represent Australia at netball.
- On 16 January 2022, Gina Crampton made her 50th senior appearance for New Zealand in the Round 2 match against England.
- On 18 January 2022, Mila Reuelu-Buchanan made her senior debut for New Zealand in the Round 3 match against South Africa.
- On 18 January 2022, Liz Watson made her 50th senior appearance for Australia in the Round 3 match against England.
- On 19 January 2022, Kayla Johnson made her 50th senior appearance for New Zealand in the match against England.

== Match officials ==
Umpires

Umpire	Association
Gary Burgess	England
Alison Harrison	Wales
Anso Kemp	South Africa
Kate Stephenson	England
Louise Travis	England
Elizna van den Berg	South Africa

== Round-robin stage ==
=== Round 1 ===
15 January 2022	England	71–47	South Africa
14:00	George Fisher 37/40 (93%); Helen Housby 19/19 (100%); Eleanor Cardwell 14/15 (93%); Sophie Drakeford-Lewis 1/1 (100%)		Ine-Marí Venter 36/38 (95%); Sigrid Burger 6/7 (86%); Lefébre Rademan 5/7 (71%)

15 January 2022	Australia	53–39	New Zealand
16:15	Gretel Bueta 31/33 (94%); Steph Wood 19/22 (86%); Cara Koenen 3/4 (75%)		Maia Wilson 24/26 (92%); Tiana Metuarau 12/18 (67%); Grace Nweke 3/5 (60%)

=== Round 2 ===
16 January 2022	Australia	60–40	South Africa
14:00	Gretel Bueta 28/31 (90%); Sophie Garbin 18/19 (95%); Steph Wood 10/11 (91%); Cara Koenen 4/5 (80%)		Ine-Marí Venter 32/37 (86%); Lefébre Rademan 8/14 (57%); Jessica du Plessis 0/1 (0%)

16 January 2022	England	49–46	New Zealand
16:15	George Fisher 25/28 (89%); Helen Housby 24/25 (96%)		Maia Wilson 32/36 (89%); Grace Nweke 10/15 (67%); Tiana Metuarau 4/5 (80%)

=== Round 3 ===
18 January 2022	New Zealand	54–43	South Africa
17:30	Grace Nweke 30/32 (94%); Tiana Metuarau 15/16 (94%); Maia Wilson 9/13 (69%)		Ine-Marí Venter 31/36 (86%); Lefébre Rademan 7/10 (70%); Sigrid Burger 5/5 (100%)

18 January 2022	England	48–48	Australia
19:30	Eleanor Cardwell 26/30 (87%); Helen Housby 22/24 (92%)		Sophie Garbin 18/20 (90%); Cara Koenen 13/16 (81%); Steph Wood 10/12 (83%); Gretel Bueta 7/9 (78%)

=== Table ===
Pos	Team	P	W	D	L	GF	GA	GD	%	Pts
1	Australia	3	2	1	0	161	127	+34	126.77	5
2	England	3	2	1	0	168	141	+27	119.15	5
3	New Zealand	3	1	0	2	139	145	-6	95.86	2
4	South Africa	3	0	0	3	130	185	-55	70.27	0

Qualified for Final
Qualified for 3rd/4th place match

== Playoffs ==
=== 3rd v 4th Playoff ===
19 January 2022	New Zealand	51–50	South Africa
17:30	Maia Wilson 39/44 (89%); Tiana Metuarau 12/14 (86%)		Ine-Marí Venter 35/36 (97%); Lefébre Rademan 15/21 (71%)

=== Final ===
19 January 2022	England	46–58	Australia
19:30	Eleanor Cardwell 30/32 (94%); Helen Housby 14/16 (88%); George Fisher 2/4 (50%)	Stats	Gretel Bueta 41/42 (98%); Steph Wood 17/18 (94%)

== Final Placings ==
Rank	Team
1st place, gold medalist(s)	Australia
2nd place, silver medalist(s)	England
3rd place, bronze medalist(s)	New Zealand
4	South Africa
