= 2012 Netball Quad Series =

International netball series

Tournament details
- Host countries: Australia; New Zealand
- Dates: 14 October–1 November 2012
- Teams: 4
- TV partner(s): Fox Sports (Australia); Sky Sport (New Zealand); SuperSport (South Africa)

Final positions
- Champions: Australia (1st title)
- Runners-up: New Zealand
- Third place: England

Tournament statistics
- Matches played: 12

The 2012 Netball Quad Series was the inaugural Netball Quad Series series. It was co-hosted by Netball Australia and Netball New Zealand. It featured Australia, England, New Zealand and South Africa playing each other in a series of twelve netball test matches in October and November 2012. The series featured six double headers with three played in Australia and three played in New Zealand. The three in Australia were also known as the Holden International Quad-Series, while the three in New Zealand were also known as the New World Quad Series. With a team coached by Lisa Alexander and captained by Natalie von Bertouch, Australia won the inaugural series. It would be 2016, before the next Netball Quad Series was organised. The series was broadcast live on Fox Sports in Australia, on Sky Sport in New Zealand and on SuperSport (South Africa).

== Squads ==
Participating teams and rosters
Australia	England	New Zealand	South Africa
Caitlin Bassett; Erin Bell; Madison Browne; Rebecca Bulley; Bianca Chatfield; Catherine Cox; Mo'onia Gerrard; Chanel Gomes; Kimberlee Green; Renae Hallinan; Chelsea Pitman; Susan Pratley; Caitlin Thwaites; Natalie von Bertouch (c)	Ama Agbeze; Eboni Beckford-Chambers; Pamela Cookey (c); Rachel Dunn; Jo Harten	Jodi Brown; Kayla Cullen; Leana de Bruin; Katrina Grant; Anna Harrison; Laura Langman; Cathrine Latu; Camilla Lees; Bailey Mes; Grace Rasmussen; Anna Thompson; Maria Tutaia; Casey Williams (c); Irene van Dyk	Chrisna Bootha; Maryka Holtzhausen; Melissa Myburgh; Lindie Lombard; Nadia Uys; Bongiwe Msomi; Thuli Qegu; Zanele Mdodana (vc); Vanes-Mari du Toit; Karla Mostert; Amanda Mynhardt (c); Adele Niemand
Coach: Lisa Alexander	Coach: Anna Mayes; Assistant coach: Maggie Jackson	Coach: Waimarama Taumaunu	Coach: Elize Kotze

== Debuts ==
- On 14 October 2012, Bailey Mes made her senior debut for New Zealand against South Africa.
- On 17 October 2012, Chanel Gomes made her senior debut for Australia against South Africa.
- On 25 October 2012, Caitlin Thwaites made her senior debut for Australia against South Africa.

== Holden International Quad-Series ==
=== Round 1 ===
14 October 2012	Australia	64–40	England	Adelaide Entertainment Centre
	Susan Pratley 22/25 (88%); Caitlin Bassett 20; Catherine Cox 15; Erin Bell 7	Report	Jo Harten 27; Pamela Cookey 8 Rachel Dunn 5

14 October 2012	New Zealand	63–27	South Africa	Adelaide Entertainment Centre
	Irene van Dyk 28/28 (100%); Cathrine Latu 18/20 (90%); Maria Tutaia 10/15 (67%); Anna Thompson 7/13 (54%)		Chrisna Bootha 19/24 (79%); Maryka Holtzhausen 4/5 (80%); Melissa Myburgh 4/5 (80%)

=== Round 2 ===
17 October 2012	New Zealand	61–43	England	Newcastle Entertainment Centre
	Maria Tutaia 31/32 (97%); Irene van Dyk 20/20 (100%); Cathrine Latu 10/11 (91%)		Jo Harten 27/32 (84%); Pamela Cookey 16/18 (89%)

17 October 2012	Australia	64–31	South Africa	Newcastle Entertainment Centre
	Caitlin Bassett 25/27 (93%); Catherine Cox 16/17 (94%); Susan Pratley 15/16 (94%); Erin Bell 7/11 (64%)	Report

=== Round 3 ===
21 October 2012	Australia	68–48	New Zealand	Allphones Arena
	Catherine Cox 29/36 (81%); Susan Pratley 29/32 (91%)		Irene van Dyk 29/29 (100%)	Attendance: 13,640

21 October 2012	England	62–53	South Africa	Allphones Arena
			Chrisna Bootha 42/44 (95%)

== New World Quad Series ==
=== Round 4 ===
25 October 2012	Australia	68–36	South Africa	TSB Arena

25 October 2012	New Zealand	57–46	England	TSB Arena
	Maria Tutaia 19/22 (86%); Irene van Dyk 14/14 (100%); Cathrine Latu 12/14 (86%); Jodi Brown 12/15 (80%)		Jo Harten 34/39 (87%); Pamela Cookey 12/14 (86%)

=== Round 5 ===
28 October 2012	Australia	57–35	England	TECT Arena
	Catherine Cox 22/28 (79%); Susan Pratley 24/28 (86%)

28 October 2012	New Zealand	63–24	South Africa	TECT Arena
	Cathrine Latu 27/27 (100%); Irene van Dyk 21/23 (91%); Maria Tutaia 10/14 (71%); Jodi Brown 5/9 (56%)		Chrisna Bootha 15/24 (63%); Maryka Holtzhausen 5/11 (45%); Melissa Myburgh 4/6 (67%)

=== Round 6 ===
1 November 2012	England	56–30	South Africa	Claudelands Arena

1 November 2012	New Zealand	48–43	Australia	Claudelands Arena
	Irene van Dyk 28/33 (85%); Maria Tutaia 20/24 (83%)		Catherine Cox 14/19 (74%); Caitlin Bassett 13/14 (93%); Susan Pratley 12/14 (86%); Erin Bell 4/7 (57%)

== Final table ==
Pos	Team	P	W	L	D	GF	GA	GD	Pts
1	Australia	6	5	1	0	364	238	+126	10
2	New Zealand	6	5	1	0	340	251	+89	10
3	England	6	2	4	0	282	322	–71	4
4	South Africa	6	0	6	0	201	376	–175	0
