= 2017 Netball Quad Series =

2017 Netball Quad Series may refer to:

- 2017 Netball Quad Series (January/February), netball tournament played in the first half of the year
- 2017 Netball Quad Series (August/September), netball tournament played in the second half of the year
