= Bongiwe Msomi =

South Africa netball international

Personal information
- Born: 19 January 1988 (age 38) Hammarsdale, KwaZulu-Natal
- Height: 1.66 m (5 ft 5 in)
- School: Chief Luthayi High School
- University: Durban University of Technology

Netball career
- Playing positions: C, WA
| Years | Club team | Apps |
| 2014–2016 | Kingdom Stars | |
| 2015 | → Surrey Storm | |
| 2016–2017 | Wasps Netball | |
| 2017–2018 | Adelaide Thunderbirds | 11 |
| 2019 | Wasps Netball | |
| 2020–2023 | Gauteng Golden Fireballs | |
| Years | National team | Caps |
| 2011–2023 | South Africa | 171 |
Coaching career
- Years: Team
- 2019–: UJ Netball
Medal record
Representing South Africa
World University Netball Championship
| Silver medal – second place | 2012 Cape Town | Team |
Fast5 Netball World Series
| Bronze medal – third place | 2012 Auckland | Team |

Bongiwe Msomi (born 19 January 1988) is a former South Africa netball international and current netball coach. Between 2011 and 2023, Msomi made 171 senior appearances for South Africa. She represented South Africa at the 2011, 2015, 2019 and 2023 Netball World Cups and at 2014, 2018 and 2022 Commonwealth Games. She was a member of the South Africa teams that medalled at the 2012 World University Netball Championship and the 2012 Fast5 Netball World Series. Between 2016 and 2023 she captained South Africa. When she retired, she was South Africa's most capped netball international. Msomi was also a member of two Netball Superleague title winning teams – in 2015 with Surrey Storm and in 2017 with Wasps Netball. In 2022 she captained Gauteng Golden Fireballs when they won the Telkom Netball League title. Since 2019, Msomi has served as netball head coach at the University of Johannesburg.

== Early life, family and education ==
Msomi was born and raised in the township of Hammarsdale near Durban, KwaZulu-Natal. She is the fifth of eight children. Her mother was a factory machinist. In 2008, her father, a community leader, passed away. She attended Chief Luthayi High School. In 2012, Msomi graduated from Durban University of Technology with a national diploma in Sport Management. Msomi's younger sister, Sinenhlanhla Msomi, played netball for Gauteng Golden Fireballs. Msomi grew up speaking Zulu and only learned English after taking up netball and becoming a team captain.

== Playing career ==
=== Early career ===
In 2004, Msomi began playing netball, aged 16, while at Chief Luthayi High School. She was watching her friends take part in a training session when she was invited to join in to make up the numbers. The coach asked her to return for the next session. Msomi credits S’thembiso G. Mncwabe, her first netball coach with beginning and supporting her netball career. Msomi recalls that Mncwabe used his own money to buy balls, cones and shoes to allow the women he coached to play. In 2005, Msomi was chosen to represent eThekwini in local competitions.

=== Kingdom Stars ===
Between 2014 and 2016, Msomi played for Kingdom Stars in the Brutal Fruit Netball Cup. In 2014 Stars finished as runners up in the Division Two Shield and she was named Players' Player of the Tournament. In 2015 she captained Stars as they won the Shield and she was named Best Defender of the Tournament. In 2016 she captained Stars to fifth place, their best position in the league. Her Stars teammates included Precious Mthembu. While playing for Stars, Msomi also worked as a teacher and netball coach at Northlands Primary School in Durban North.

=== Surrey Storm ===
In 2015, Msomi signed for Surrey Storm of the Netball Superleague. Tamsin Greenway, the Surrey Storm head coach, first saw Msomi play at the 2014 Commonwealth Games. She subsequently contacted her via Facebook and invited her to play for Storm. On 14 March 2015, Msomi made her debut for Storm against Manchester Thunder when she came on as a replacement for the third quarter. On 17 March 2015, she made her first start in a 61–39 win against Team Bath and was named Player of the Match. Msomi's contributions helped the 2015 Surrey Storm team win the title. In the grand final they defeated Hertfordshire Mavericks 56–39.

=== Wasps ===
In September 2016, Msomi signed for Wasps Netball of the Netball Superleague, linking up again with Tamsin Greenway. She was subsequently a member of the Wasps team that won the 2017 Netball Superleague title and in the grand final she was named player of the match. After spending the 2018 season with Adelaide Thunderbirds, Msomi rejoined Wasps for the 2019 Netball Superleague season and was a member of their team that finished as runners up.

=== Adelaide Thunderbirds ===
Msomi joined Adelaide Thunderbirds for the 2018 Suncorp Super Netball season. She subsequently made 11 senior appearances. However, it was not a successful season. Thunderbirds finished the 2018 season winless. While playing for Thunderbirds, Msomi also spent time coaching at Contax Netball Club.

=== Gauteng Golden Fireballs ===
In 2020, Msomi was a member of the Gauteng Golden Fireballs team that finished third in the Telkom Netball League. Her 2020 teammates at Fireballs included her younger sister, Sinenhlanhla Msomi. In 2022, Msomi captained Fireballs when they won the TNL title. In the final they defeated Gauteng Jaguars 35–32.

=== South Africa ===
Between 2011 and 2023, Msomi made 171 senior appearances for South Africa. Between 2016 and 2023 she captained South Africa. When she retired, she was South Africa's most capped netball international. She had previously captained the under-21s team at the 2009 World Youth Netball Championships. She made her senior debut for South Africa against Jamaica at the 2011 World Netball Championships. She was a member of the South Africa teams that medalled at the 2012 World University Netball Championship and the 2012 Fast5 Netball World Series. In 2013 she became vice-captain to Maryka Holtzhausen and she captained the South Africa team that won the 2013 Diamond Challenge. She subsequently represented South Africa at the 2014 Commonwealth Games and 2015 Netball World Cup. In August 2016, Msomi was announced as South Africa captain for the 2016 Netball Quad Series, effectively succeeding Holtzhausen permanently. On 3 September 2017, Msomi captained South Africa to their first ever Netball Quad Series victory when they defeated England 54–51. At the 2019 Netball World Cup, Msomi made her 100th senior appearance for South Africa in a 90–35 win against Fiji.

Ahead of the 2022 Commonwealth Games, Netball South Africa awarded players professional contracts for the first time. Msomi was one of 24 players to receive a contract. At the 2022 Commonwealth Games Parade of Nations, Msomi was selected as one of South Africa's flag bearers. In August 2022, Msomi became South Africa's most capped netball international when she made her 151st appearance during the a 2023 Netball World Cup qualifying tournament. In 2023, Msomi made her fourth appearance at a Netball World Cup.

| Tournaments | Place |
|---|---|
| 2011 World Netball Championships | 5th |
| 2011 World Netball Series | 5th |
| 2012 World University Netball Championship | 2nd place, silver medalist(s) |
| 2012 Diamond Challenge | 1st |
| 2012 Netball Quad Series | 4th |
| 2012 Fast5 Netball World Series | 3rd place, bronze medalist(s) |
| 2013 African Netball Championship | 1st |
| 2013 Diamond Challenge | 1st |
| 2013 Fast5 Netball World Series | 6th |
| 2014 Commonwealth Games | 6th |
| 2015 Diamond Challenge | 1st |
| 2015 Taini Jamison Trophy Series | 2nd |
| 2015 Netball World Cup | 5th |
| 2016 Netball Quad Series | 4th |
| 2016 Diamond Challenge | 1st |
| 2017 Netball Quad Series (January/February) | 4th |
| 2017 Netball Quad Series (August/September) | 4th |
| 2018 Netball Quad Series (January) | 4th |
| 2018 Commonwealth Games | 5th |
| 2018 Netball Quad Series (September) | 4th |
| 2018 Diamond Challenge | 1st |
| 2019 Netball Quad Series | 4th |
| 2019 Netball World Cup | 4th |
| 2019 Africa Netball Cup | 1st |
| 2019 South Africa England netball series | 2nd |
| 2020 Netball Nations Cup | 4th |
| 2020 South Africa Malawi netball series | 1st |
| 2021 SPAR Challenge Series | 1st |
| 2021 Africa Netball Cup | 1st |
| 2022 Netball Quad Series | 4th |
| 2022 Commonwealth Games | 6th |
| 2023 Netball World Cup qualification – Africa | 1st |
| 2022 SPAR Diamond Challenge | 1st |
| 2023 Netball Quad Series | 4th |
| 2023 Netball World Cup | 6th |

== Coaching career ==
=== UJ Netball ===
In August 2019, Msomi was appointed head coach of the University of Johannesburg Netball Club. In 2023, Msomi guided UJ Netball to their first Varsity Netball final. However, they finished as runners up after losing 63–61 to UP-Tuks in the final. In 2024, Msomi guided UJ Netball to the final for the second consecutive year. However, once again they finished as runners up, this time losing 58–55 to UFS Kovsies.

== Honours ==
=== Player ===
South Africa

- Africa Netball Cup
  - Winners: 2013, 2019, 2021
- Diamond Challenge
  - Winners: 2012, 2013, 2015, 2016, 2018, 2021, 2022
- World University Netball Championship
  - Runners Up: 2012

Surrey Storm

- Netball Superleague
  - Winners: 2015

Wasps Netball

- Netball Superleague
  - Winners: 2017
  - Runners Up: 2019

Gauteng Golden Fireballs

- Telkom Netball League
  - Winners: 2022

Kingdom Stars

- Division Two Shield
  - Winners: 2015

=== Coach ===
UJ Netball

- Varsity Netball
  - Runners Up: 2023, 2024
