= Jenny van Dyk =

South African netball player and coach

Personal information
- Born: 10 December 1982 (age 43) Pretoria, South Africa
- School: Hoërskool Oos-Moot
- University: University of Pretoria

Netball career
- Playing position: WA
Years	Club team	Apps
2001–200x	UP-Tuks	
Coaching career
- Years: Team
- 2011–2023: UP-Tuks
- 2014–2021: Gauteng Jaguars
- 2018, 2021: President's XII
- 2022: Botswana
- 2023–2024: South Africa U21
- 2024–: South Africa

Jenny van Dyk is the current head coach of the South Africa national netball team. Between 2011 and 2023, van Dyk served as head coach of UP-Tuks, guiding the team to three Varsity Netball titles. Between 2014 and 2021, she also served as head coach of Gauteng Jaguars in the Premier Netball League, guiding the team to five titles.

== Early life and education ==
Van Dyk was born in Pretoria and, between 1996 and 2000, she attended Hoërskool Oos-Moot. In 2001 she began attending the University of Pretoria, where she would eventually gain a Bachelor of Social Science with Specialization in Sports Psychology.

== Playing career ==
=== UP-Tuks ===
In the early 2000s, van Dyk played for UP-Tuks as a wing attack. She played for South Africa at under-21 level and was twice selected for the senior squad.

== Coaching career ==
=== UP Tuks ===
In 2006, van Dyk started coaching at UP-Tuks Netball, initially with the under-19s. Between 2008 and 2011, van Dyk effectively served as an assistant coach to Elize Kotze. When Kotze became head coach of the South Africa national netball team, van Dyk, aged 27, succeeded her as head coach at UP-Tuks. In 2017, after finishing as runners-up in 2014 and 2016, UP-Tuks and van Dyk won their first Varsity Netball title. With a team captained by Shadine van der Merwe and featuring Marlize de Bruin and Ine-Marí Venter, UP-Tuks defeated NWU-Pukke 43–41 in the final. In 2019, UP-Tuks and van Dyk won their second title, this time defeating Maties 48–43 in the final. In 2023, van Dyk guided UP-Tuks to a third title after defeating UJ Netball 63–61 in the final.

=== Gauteng Jaguars ===
Between 2014 and 2021, van Dyk served as head coach of Gauteng Jaguars in the Premier Netball League. Between 2017 and 2021, she guided them to five successive titles. In 2017, with a team coached by van Dyk, captained by Shadine van der Merwe and featuring Izette Griesel and Chrisna van Zyl, Jaguars won their first title after defeating North West Flames 49–43 in the final. In 2018, under van Dyk's guidance, Jaguars retained the title. In 2017 and 2018, van Dyk was also head coach when Jaguars played in the Netball New Zealand Super Club tournaments. In 2018, she guided a Jaguars team to a win over Southern Steel, the 2018 ANZ Premiership premiers. Van Dyk subsequently guided to Jaguars to further titles in 2019, 2020 and 2021.

=== Botswana ===
In 2022, van Dyk served as head coach of Botswana. She initially took charge of Botswana at a 2023 Netball World Cup qualifier. Under van Dyk's guidance, Botswana won the 2022 Netball Singapore Nations Cup, defeating Fiji 65–37 in final on her 40th birthday.

=== South Africa ===
In February 2024, Netball South Africa announced that van Dyk had been appointed head coach of South Africa, succeeding Norma Plummer. Immediately prior to her appointment, she was serving as head coach of the South Africa under 21 team. She had previously coached the South Africa under-19 team. She coached South Africa at the 2018 World University Netball Championship. At the 2018 Diamond Challenge and 2021 SPAR Challenge Series she coached the President's XII.

Tournaments	Place	Team
2018 World University Netball Championship	2nd	South Africa
2018 Diamond Challenge	2nd	(South Africa) President's XII
2021 SPAR Challenge Series	1st	(South Africa) President's XII
2023 Netball World Cup qualification – Africa	6th	Botswana
2022 Netball Singapore Nations Cup	1st	Botswana
2024 Africa Netball Cup	1st	South Africa
2025 Netball Nations Cup	2nd	South Africa
2025 Taini Jamison Trophy Series	2nd	South Africa
2025 Australia South Africa netball series	2nd	South Africa

== Honours ==
=== Coach ===
South Africa

- Africa Netball Cup
  - Winners: 2024

Botswana

- Netball Singapore Nations Cup
  - Winners: 2022

UP-Tuks

- Varsity Netball
  - Winners: 2017, 2019, 2023
  - Runners up: 2014, 2016, 2018

Gauteng Jaguars

- Telkom Netball League
  - Winners: 2017, 2018, 2019, 2020, 2021
  - Runners Up: 2014, 2015, 2016
