= 2017 Netball Quad Series (August/September) =

International netball series

Tournament details
- Host countries: Australia; New Zealand
- Dates: 26 August–3 September 2017
- Teams: 4
- TV partner(s): Nine/9Gem (Australia); Sky Sports (UK/Ireland); Sky Sport (New Zealand); SuperSport (South Africa)

Final positions
- Champions: New Zealand (1st title)
- Runners-up: Australia
- Third place: England

Tournament statistics
- Matches played: 6
- Top scorer(s): Lenize Potgieter; 126/138 (91%)

The second 2017 Netball Quad Series was the fourth Netball Quad Series series. It was co-hosted by Netball Australia and Netball New Zealand. It featured Australia, England, New Zealand and South Africa playing each other in a series of six netball test matches in August and September 2017. It was the second of two Netball Quad Series' played in 2017. The first series was played in January and February. In Round 2, England defeated New Zealand 49–45. It was only their fifth victory over New Zealand in 88 meetings. In Round 3, South Africa defeated England 54–51. It was the first time South Africa had won a Netball Quad Series match and it was their biggest win over England since 1997. With a team coached by Janine Southby and captained by Katrina Grant, New Zealand won their first Quad series, securing the title with a 57–47 win over Australia.

The series was broadcast live on Nine/9Gem in Australia, on Sky Sports in the United Kingdom and Ireland, on Sky Sport in New Zealand and on SuperSport (South Africa).

== Squads ==
Participating teams and rosters
Australia	England	New Zealand	South Africa
Caitlin Bassett (c); April Brandley; Courtney Bruce; Emily Mannix; Tegan Philip; Kim Ravaillion; Madison Robinson; Gabi Simpson; Caitlin Thwaites; Gretel Tippett; Liz Watson; Jo Weston	Ama Agbeze (c); Sara Bayman; Eboni Beckford-Chambers; Eleanor Cardwell; Jade Clarke (vc); Beth Cobden; Kadeen Corbin; Stacey Francis; Jodie Gibson; Serena Guthrie; Jo Harten (vc); Natalie Haythornthwaite; Helen Housby; Geva Mentor; Chelsea Pitman	Gina Crampton; Monica Falkner; Shannon Francois; Katrina Grant (c); Kelly Jury; Phoenix Karaka; Bailey Mes; Te Paea Selby-Rickit; Samantha Sinclair; Whitney Souness; Maria Tutaia; Jane Watson; Maia Wilson	Erin Burger; Maryka Holtzhausen; Danelle Lochner; Rochelle Loubser; Phumza Maweni; Karla Mostert (vc); Bongiwe Msomi (c); Precious Mthembu; Nadia Uys Pienaar; Lenize Potgieter; Ine-Marí Venter; Zanele Vimbela
Coach: Lisa Alexander	Coach: Tracey Neville	Coach: Janine Southby	Coach: Elsje Jordaan

== Debuts ==
- On 26 August 2017, Courtney Bruce made her senior debut for Australia against England.
- On 26 August 2017, Whitney Souness made her senior debut for New Zealand against South Africa.

== Matches ==
=== Round 1 ===
26 August 2017	Australia	54–50	England	Brisbane Entertainment Centre
3:00 PM	Caitlin Bassett 43/46 (93%); Gretel Tippett 7/9 (78%); Tegan Philip 4/5 (80%)		Helen Housby 30/34 (88%); Kadeen Corbin 20/25 (80%)

26 August 2017	New Zealand	63–56	South Africa	Brisbane Entertainment Centre
5:00 PM	Bailey Mes 35/36 (97%); Maria Tutaia 28/34 (82%)	Stats	Lenize Potgieter 43/49 (88%); Maryka Holtzhausen 13/20 (65%)

=== Round 2 ===
30 August 2017	Australia	58–52	South Africa	AIS Arena
7:30 PM	Caitlin Thwaites 30/33 (91%); Gretel Tippett 16/20 (80%); Caitlin Bassett 7/7 (100%); Tegan Philip 5/8 (63%)		Lenize Potgieter 40/44 (91%); Maryka Holtzhausen 12/14 (86%)

30 August 2017	New Zealand	45–49	England	The Trusts Arena
7:30 PM	Bailey Mes 28/33 (85%); Te Paea Selby-Rickit 17/21 (81%)	Stats	Helen Housby 26/32 (81%); Kadeen Corbin 23/30 (77%)

=== Round 3 ===
3 September 2017	South Africa	54–51	England	ILT Stadium Southland
2:00 PM	Lenize Potgieter 43/45 (96%); Maryka Holtzhausen 11/15 (73%)	Stats	Helen Housby 26/29 (90%); Jo Harten 15/18 (83%); Kadeen Corbin 10/13 (77%)

3 September 2017	Australia	57–47	New Zealand	ILT Stadium Southland
4:00 PM	Te Paea Selby-Rickit 35/41 (85%); Bailey Mes 17/18 (94%); Maia Wilson 5/5 (100%)		Caitlin Bassett 22/24 (92%); Tegan Philip 11/12 (92%); Caitlin Thwaites 10/11 (91%); Gretel Tippett 4/5 (80%)

== Final table ==
Pos	Team	P	W	L	GF	GA	GD	%	Pts
1	New Zealand	3	2	1	165	152	+13	108.55%	4
2	Australia	3	2	1	159	159	0	100.00%	4
3	England	3	1	2	150	153	–3	98.04%	2
4	South Africa	3	1	2	162	172	–10	94.19%	2
