= Tsakane Mbewe =

South African netball player (born 1987)

Personal information
- Born: 8 April 1987 (age 39) South Africa
- Height: 1.78 m (5 ft 10 in)

Netball career
- Playing positions: GS, GA
Medal record
Representing South Africa
Fast5 Netball World Series
Bronze medal – third place	2012 Auckland	Team

Tsakane Mbewe (born 8 April 1987) is a South African netball player. She plays in the positions of GS and GA. She participated in the 2011 World Netball Series in Liverpool, UK.
