= 2012 Fast5 Netball World Series =

International Fast5 tournament hosted by New Zealand

Tournament details
- Host country: New Zealand
- City: Auckland
- Venue: Vector Arena
- Dates: 9–11 November 2012
- Teams: 6
- TV partner: Sky Sport (New Zealand)

Final positions
- Champions: New Zealand (3rd title)
- Runners-up: England
- Third place: South Africa

Tournament statistics
- Matches played: 20

The 2012 Fast5 Netball World Series was the 4th Fast5 Netball World Series. New Zealand hosted Australia, England, Jamaica, Malawi and South Africa in a series, played in November 2012, at Auckland's Vector Arena. This series was the first to use the new Fast5 netball rules. With a team coached by Waimarama Taumaunu and captained by Laura Langman, New Zealand won the series for the third time after defeating England 23–21 in the final. South Africa finished third after defeating Jamaica 38–34 in a play-off. On Day 2 of the series, New Zealand's Anna Harrison used her Harrison Hoist technique while playing against England. Sky Sport (New Zealand) was the main series broadcaster.

== Squads ==
Participating teams and rosters
Australia	England	Jamaica	Malawi	New Zealand	South Africa
Shae Bolton; Ashleigh Brazill; Chanel Gomes; Karyn Howarth; April Letton; Elissa Macleod (c); Kim Ravaillion; Kate Shimmin; Verity Simmons; Caitlin Thwaites; Amorette Wild	Eboni Beckford-Chambers (c); Kadeen Corbin; Rachel Dunn; Stacey Francis; Jodie Gibson; Serena Guthrie; Joanne Harten; Lindsay Keable; Laura Malcolm; Yasmin Parsons	Nadine Bryan (c); Jhaniele Fowler; Anna-Kay Griffiths; Malysha Kelly; Sasha-Gay Lynch; Patricia McCalla; Kimone Tulloch; Shantal Slater; Shamera Sterling; Vangelee Williams	Thandie Galleta; Joanna Kachilika; Beatrice Mpinganjira; Caroline Mtukule; Tina Kamzati; Bridget Kumwenda; Mwai Kumwenda (c); Loreen Ngwira; Sindi Simtowe; Towera Vinkhumbo	Kayla Cullen; Leana de Bruin; Katrina Grant; Anna Harrison; Laura Langman (c); Bailey Mes; Te Huinga Reo Selby-Rickit; Anna Thompson; Maria Tutaia; Irene van Dyk	Chrisna Bootha; Vanes-Mari Du Toit; Maryka Holtzhausen; Nontle Gwavu; Tsakane Mbewe; Simnikiwe Mdaka (c); Karla Mostert; Bongiwe Msomi; Amanda Mynhardt; Nadia Uys
Coach: Lisa Alexander	Coach: Anna Mayes	Coach: Oberon Pitterson	Coach: Griffin Saenda	Coach: Waimarama Taumaunu	Coach: Lana Krige
Support staff: Julie Fitzgerald	Support staff: Colette Thomson; Maggie Jackson	Support staff: Marvette Anderson	Support staff: Samuel Kanyenda	Support staff: Debbie Fuller; Natalie Avellino	Support staff: Elize Kotze

== Match officials ==
Umpires

Umpire	Association
Jonathan Bredin	New Zealand
Anso Kemp	South Africa
Clare McCabe	Australia
Terrence Peart	Jamaica
Kristie Simpson	New Zealand
Sarah Watts	England
Kate Wilcox	England

== Round robin stage ==
=== Day 1 ===
9 November 2012	South Africa	34–25	Jamaica
17:00 (NZDT)

9 November 2012	England	29–27	Australia
17:45 NZDT

9 November 2012	New Zealand	38–38	Jamaica
18:30 NZDT

9 November 2012	Malawi	33–15	Australia
19:15 NZDT

9 November 2012	England	41–27	South Africa
20:00 NZDT

9 November 2012	Jamaica	32–31	Malawi
20:45 NZDT

9 November 2012	New Zealand	31–23	Australia
21:30 NZDT

=== Day 2 ===
10 November 2012	England	39–28	Jamaica
16:15 NZDT

10 November 2012	New Zealand	44–24	Malawi
17:00 NZDT

10 November 2012	South Africa	28–27	Australia
17:45 NZDT

10 November 2012	Malawi	27–23	England
18:30 NZDT

10 November 2012	New Zealand	52–19	South Africa
19:15 NZDT

10 November 2012	Jamaica	34–33	Australia
20:00 NZDT

10 November 2012	South Africa	48–34	Malawi
20:45 NZDT

10 November 2012	New Zealand	47–31	England
21:30 NZDT

=== Table ===
Pos	Team	P	W	L	D	GF	GA	GD	Pts
1	New Zealand	5	4	0	1	212	135	+77	9
2	England	5	3	2	0	163	156	+7	6
3	South Africa	5	3	2	0	156	179	-23	6
4	Jamaica	5	2	2	1	157	166	-9	5
5	Malawi	5	2	3	0	149	162	-13	4
6	Australia	5	0	5	0	125	155	-30	0

Qualified for Semi-final 1
Qualified for Semi-final 2
Qualified for 5th/6th place match

== Playoffs ==
=== Semi-final 1 ===
11 November 2012	New Zealand	52–18	Jamaica
15:15 NZDT

=== Semi-final 2 ===
11 November 2012	England	39–15	South Africa
16:00 NZDT

=== 5th v 6th Playoff ===
11 November 2012	Malawi	33–30	Australia
16:45 NZDT

=== 3rd v 4th Playoff ===
11 November 2012	South Africa	38–34	Jamaica
18:55 (NZDT)

=== Final ===
11 November 2012	New Zealand	23–21	England
19:45 NZDT

== Final Placings ==
Rank	Team
1st place, gold medalist(s)	New Zealand
2nd place, silver medalist(s)	England
3rd place, bronze medalist(s)	South Africa
4	Jamaica
5	Malawi
6	Australia
