= 2013 Diamond Challenge =

International netball series hosted by South Africa

Tournament details
- Host country: South Africa
- City: Port Elizabeth
- Venue(s): NMMU Indoor Sports Centre; Nelson Mandela University
- Dates: 27–30 October 2013
- Teams: 3
- TV partner: SuperSport (South Africa)

Final positions
- Champions: South Africa
- Runners-up: Zimbabwe
- Third place: Zambia

The 2013 Diamond Challenge was the second Diamond Challenge netball series. It featured South Africa, Zambia and Zimbabwe. The series was played in October 2013 at the NMMU Indoor Sports Centre at Nelson Mandela University in Port Elizabeth. South Africa entered an Invitational team featuring under-21 players, including Shadine van der Merwe. Coached by Elize Kotze and captained by Bongiwe Msomi, South Africa won the series. South Africa finished the series undefeated, winning all three matches. In the final they defeated Zimbabwe 59–45. The series was broadcast live on SuperSport in South Africa.

== Head coaches and captains ==
Team	Head coach	Captain
South Africa	Elize Kotze	Bongiwe Msomi
Zambia		
Zimbabwe	Ledwine Dondo	Perpetua Siyachitema

== Group stage ==
27 October 2013	Zimbabwe	39–34	Zambia
17.30

28 October 2013	South Africa	64–36	Zimbabwe
17.30

29 October 2013	South Africa	69–47	Zambia
17.30

== Final table ==
Pos	Team	P	W	L	D	GF	GA	GD	Pts
1	South Africa	2	2	0	0	133	83	50	4
2	Zimbabwe	2	1	1	0	75	98	–23	2
3	Zambia	2	0	2	0	81	108	–27	0

Qualified for Final

== Final ==
30 October 2013	South Africa	59–45	Zimbabwe
17.30

== Award winners ==
Award	Winner	Team
Player of the Series	Bongiwe Msomi	South Africa
Final Player of the Match	Shadine van der Merwe	South Africa
