= Zukelwa Cwaba =

South African netball player (born 1984)

Personal information
- Born: 15 October 1984 (age 41) South Africa
- Height: 1.87 m (6 ft 1 1/2 in)

Netball career
- Playing positions: GK, GD, GS, GA
| Years | National team | Caps |
- South Africa
- (Correct as of 27 November 2011)

Zukelwa Cwaba (born 15 October 1984) is a South African netball player. She plays in the positions of GK, GD, GS and GA. She is a member of the South Africa national netball team and has competed in the 2010 Commonwealth Games in Delhi, the 2007 World Netball Championships in Auckland and the 2011 World Netball Championships in Singapore. She has also participated in the 2011 World Netball Series in Liverpool, UK.
