= Kgomotso Itlhabanyeng =

South African netball player (born 1989)

Personal information
- Born: 5 June 1989 (age 35); South Africa
- Height: 1.78 m (5 ft 10 in)

Netball career
- Playing position(s): WA

Kgomotso Itlhabanyeng (born 5 June 1989) is a South African netball player. She plays in the positions of C, WA and WD. She has participated in the 2011 World Netball Series in Liverpool, UK.
