= 2011 World Netball Series =

International netball tournament hosted by England

Tournament details
- Host country: England
- City: Liverpool
- Venue: Echo Arena
- Dates: 25–27 November 2011
- Teams: 6
- TV partner: Sky Sport (New Zealand)

Final positions
- Champions: England (1st title)
- Runners-up: New Zealand
- Third place: Australia

Tournament statistics
- Matches played: 20

The 2011 World Netball Series was the 3rd World Netball Series. England hosted Australia, Fiji, Jamaica, New Zealand and South Africa in a series, played in November 2011, at Liverpool's Echo Arena. With a team coached by Anna Mayes and captained by Jade Clarke, England defeated New Zealand 33–26 in the final to win their first major tournament. Jamaica's captain, Nadine Bryan, was named player of the series. The series was broadcast live by Sky Sport (New Zealand).

== Squads ==
Participating teams and rosters
Australia	England	Fiji	Jamaica	New Zealand	South Africa
Emily Beaton; Kate Beveridge; Ashleigh Brazill; Chanel Gomes; Bianca Chatfield (cc); Carla Dziwoki; April Letton; Susan Pratley (cc); Verity Simmons; Amy Steel; Vanessa Ware; Amorette Wild	Sara Bayman; Eboni Beckford-Chambers; Jade Clarke (c); Pamela Cookey (vc); Kadeen Corbin; Sasha Corbin; Emma Dovey; Rachel Dunn; Stacey Francis; Serena Guthrie; Jo Harten; Laura Malcolm		Nadine Bryan (c); Jhaniele Fowler; Jodi-Ann Ffrench-Kentish; Anna Kay Griffith; Dhanyel Johnson; Malysha Kelly; Sasha-Gay Lynch; Patricia McCalla; Tracy-Ann Robinson; Deneen Taylor; Vanessa Walker; Vangelee Williams	Kayla Cullen; Shannon Francois; Katrina Grant; Cathrine Latu; Camilla Lees; Liana Leota; Anna Scarlett; Anna Thompson; Sulu Tone-Fitzpatrick; Jessica Tuki; Maria Tutaia; Irene van Dyk (c)	Chrisna Bootha; Erin Burger; Zukelwa Cwaba; Vanes-Mari Du Toit; Maryka Holtzhausen; Kgomotso Itlhabanyeng; Tsakane Mbewe; Karla Mostert; Bongiwe Msomi; Precious Mthembu; Amanda Mynhardt (c); Thuli Qegu
Coach: Lisa Alexander	Coach: Anna Mayes	Coach: Unaisi Rokoura	Coach: Oberon Pitterson	Coach: Waimarama Taumaunu	Coach: Elize Kotze
Assistant coach: Julie Fitzgerald	Assistant coaches: Colette Thomson; Tracey Neville	Assistant coach:	Assistant coach: Annett Daley	Assistant coach: Julie Seymour	Assistant coach:

== Round robin stage ==
=== Round 1 ===
25 November 2011	Australia	28–14	Jamaica
13:40 (GMT)

25 November 2011	England	34–15	Fiji
14:25 (GMT)

25 November 2011	New Zealand	33–14	South Africa
15:10 (GMT)

=== Round 2 ===
25 November 2011	Australia	39–15	Fiji
18:35 (GMT)

25 November 2011	Jamaica	38–29	South Africa
19:20 (GMT)

25 November 2011	England	16–32	New Zealand
20:05 (GMT)

=== Round 3 ===
25 November 2011	South Africa	23–17	Fiji
20:50 (GMT)

26 November 2011	England	25–28	Australia
10:05 (GMT)

26 November 2011	Jamaica	27–23	New Zealand
10:50 (GMT)

=== Round 4 ===
26 November 2011	England	26–17	South Africa
11:35 (GMT)

26 November 2011	Jamaica	31–21	Fiji
12:20 (GMT)

26 November 2011	Australia	28–27	New Zealand
14:35 (GMT)

=== Round 5 ===
26 November 2011	England	16–21	Jamaica
15:20 (GMT)

26 November 2011	Australia	35–21	South Africa
16:05 (GMT)

26 November 2011	New Zealand	24–14	Fiji
16:50 (GMT)

=== Table ===
Pos	Team	P	W	L	D	GF	GA	GD	Pts
1	Australia	5	5	0	0	158	116	+42	10
2	Jamaica	5	4	1	0	131	117	+14	8
3	New Zealand	5	3	2	0	139	99	+40	6
4	England	5	2	3	0	117	113	+4	4
5	South Africa	5	1	4	0	104	149	-45	2
6	Fiji	5	0	5	0	82	151	-69	0

Qualified for Semi-final 1
Qualified for Semi-final 2
Qualified for 5th/6th place match

== Playoffs ==
=== Semi-final 1 ===
27 November 2011	England	27–17	Australia
13:05 (GMT)

=== Semi-final 2 ===
27 November 2011	New Zealand	30–29	Jamaica
13:50 (GMT)

=== 5th v 6th Playoff ===
27 November 2011	South Africa	24–19	Fiji
14:35 (GMT)

=== 3rd v 4th Playoff ===
27 November 2011	Australia	32–24	Jamaica
15:20 (GMT)

=== Final ===
27 November 2011	England	33–26	New Zealand
16:05 (GMT)

== Final Placings ==
Rank	Team
1st place, gold medalist(s)	England
2nd place, silver medalist(s)	New Zealand
3rd place, bronze medalist(s)	Australia
4	Jamaica
5	South Africa
6	Fiji
