= Netball Quad Series =

International netball series

- Current season, competition or edition: 2023 Netball Quad Series
- Sport: Netball
- First season: 2012
- No. of teams: 4
- Most recent champion: Australia
- Most titles: Australia (9 titles)
- Broadcasters: Fox Sports (Australia); Sky Sports (UK/Ireland); Sky Sport (New Zealand); SuperSport (South Africa)

The Netball Quad Series, also referred to as the SANZEA Netball Quad Series, is an international netball series. The series traditionally features Australia, England, New Zealand and South Africa playing a series of test matches against each other. The inaugural series was played in 2012. However, it was not until 2016 that the series became a regular event. Australia won the inaugural series and have gone on to become the competition's dominant team. On occasions when one of the traditional four has not entered, the series has been replaced by the Netball Nations Cup. This first happened in 2020 and again in 2024.

The series' have been broadcast live on Fox Sports and Kayo Freebies in Australia, on Sky Sports and Sky Sports YouTube in the United Kingdom and Ireland, on Sky Sport in New Zealand and on SuperSport (South Africa).

== History ==
=== Inaugural series ===
The inaugural 2012 series was co-hosted by Netball Australia and Netball New Zealand. With a team coached by Lisa Alexander and captained by Natalie von Bertouch, Australia won the inaugural series. However, the 2012 series proved to be a one off event and it would be 2016, before the next series was organised.

=== Relaunch ===
In December 2015, Netball Australia, Netball New Zealand, England Netball and Netball South Africa formed a partnership called SANZEA and announced their plans to organise the 2016 and 2017 tournaments. In March 2016, SANZEA relaunched the series, initially referred to as the International Netball Super Series. In August 2016, ahead of the 2016 series, Lisa Alexander, Australia's head coach, stressed that international netball needed a competition similar to the Six Nations or The Rugby Championship. With a team coached by Alexander and captained by Clare McMeniman, Australia subsequently won the 2016 series, securing the title with a 60–55 win against New Zealand.

=== Australia dominates ===
With a team coached by Lisa Alexander and captained by Sharni Layton, Australia won the first 2017 Netball Quad Series, securing the title with a 47–46 win over England. Later in 2017, New Zealand briefly broke Australia's monopoly of the series. With a team coached by Janine Southby and captained by Katrina Grant, New Zealand won their first Quad series, securing the second 2017 Netball Quad Series with a 57–47 win over Australia. However, Australia's dominance was soon restored and they subsequently won the next three Netball Quad Series.

=== Netball Nations Cup ===
In 2020, Australia opted out of taking part and they were subsequently replaced by Jamaica. Without Australia, the series was referred to as the Netball Nations Cup. With a team coached by Noeline Taurua and captained by Ameliaranne Ekenasio, New Zealand won the tournament, winning all four of their matches and defeating Jamaica 67–56 in the final.

In 2024, South Africa opted out of taking part and were subsequently replaced by Uganda. With a team coached by Stacey Marinkovich and captained by Liz Watson, Australia won the series after defeating England 69–49 in the final.

In 2025, with a team coached by Jess Thirlby and captained by Fran Williams, England won the series for the first time after defeating South Africa 61–55 in the final. It proved sixth time lucky for England. Since the Nations Cup/Quad Series was established in 2012, England had finished as runners up five times.

== Format ==
Between 2012 and 2019, the series used a round-robin format to determine the winner and places. In 2012 the four teams played two rounds of matches. However, subsequent series up to 2019, featured a single round of matches. In 2020, a final and 3rd/4th playoff were added.

== Results ==
=== Round-robin series ===
Series	Refs	Winners	Runners up	Third	Fourth
2012		Australia	New Zealand	England	South Africa
2016		Australia	New Zealand	England	South Africa
2017 (I)		Australia	New Zealand	England	South Africa
2017 (II)		New Zealand	Australia	England	South Africa
2018 (I)		Australia	England	New Zealand	South Africa
2018 (II)		Australia	England	New Zealand	South Africa
2019		Australia	England	New Zealand	South Africa

=== Finals ===
Series	Winners	Score	Runners up	Venue
2020	New Zealand	67–56	Jamaica	Copper Box Arena
2020	^{(Note 1)}			
2022	Australia	58–46	England	Copper Box Arena
2023	Australia	56–50	New Zealand	Cape Town
2024	Australia	69–49	England	First Direct Arena
2025	England	61–55	South Africa	Copper Box Arena

=== 3rd/4th Playoff ===
Series	Third	Score	Fourth	Venue
2020	England	65–63	South Africa	Copper Box Arena
2020	^{(Note 1)}			
2022	New Zealand	51–50	South Africa	Copper Box Arena
2023	England	49–42	South Africa	Cape Town
2024	New Zealand	62–57	Uganda	First Direct Arena
2025	Uganda	50–45	Malawi	Copper Box Arena

Notes

- ^1 A series due to be held in Australia and New Zealand in September and October 2020 was cancelled due to the COVID-19 pandemic.
