= Amanda Mynhardt =

South African netball player (born 1986)

Personal information
- Born: 9 January 1986 (age 40) South Africa
- Height: 1.83 m (6 ft 0 in)

Netball career
- Playing positions: GK, GD
Years	National team	Caps
Medal record
Representing South Africa
Fast5 Netball World Series
Bronze medal – third place	2012 Auckland	Team

Amanda Mynhardt (born 9 January 1986) is a South African netball player. She plays in the positions of GK and GD. She is currently captain of the South Africa national netball team and has competed in the 2010 Commonwealth Games in Delhi and the 2011 World Netball Championships in Singapore. She has also participated in the 2010 World Netball Series and the 2011 World Netball Series, both held in Liverpool, UK. In October 2012, she travelled with the Proteas to participate in the 2012 Netball Quad Series, and in November 2012 she was a member of the Proteas Fast5 team in the 2012 Fast5 Netball World Series where she won a bronze medal.

In 2012, she travelled to New Zealand to play club netball. She was selected into the North NPC team, where she was coached by ex-Silver Ferns coach Yvonne Willering.
