= Thuli Qegu =

South African netball player (born 1987)

Personal information
- Full name: Nokuthula Qegu
- Born: 22 March 1987 (age 39) South Africa
- Height: 1.73 m (5 ft 8 in)

Netball career
- Playing position(s): C, WA, WD

Thuli Qegu (born 22 March 1987) is a South African netball player. She plays in the positions of C, WA and WD. She participated in the 2011 World Netball Series in Liverpool, UK.
