= 2023 Netball World Cup qualification – Africa =

Tournament details
- Host country: South Africa
- City: Pretoria
- Dates: 21–27 August 2022
- Teams: 9

Tournament statistics
- Matches played: 24

The Africa Netball World Cup Qualifiers were held in Pretoria, South Africa, between 21 August and 27 August 2022, with nine teams taking part. South Africa, while still participating in the tournament, had already qualified for the World Cup due to being the hosts, leaving eight teams to compete for two qualifying places.

Teams competed in two pools, with each team playing every other team in the pool. At the end of the pool stage, the first-placed team in each pool played the second-placed team of the other pool, with the winners playing each other in the final and the remaining teams playing each other to determine 3rd through 9th place. The top two teams of the tournament (excluding South Africa) qualified for the Netball World Cup.

== Pool A ==
=== Standings ===
Team	Pld	W	D	L	GF	GA	GD	Pts
South Africa	4	4	0	0	248	152	96	8
Zimbabwe	4	3	0	1	184	179	5	6
Botswana	4	2	0	2	177	197	-20	4
Namibia	4	1	0	3	176	196	-20	2
Tanzania	4	0	0	4	148	209	-61	0

=== Matches ===
21 August 2022	Namibia	54–40	Tanzania

21 August 2022	Botswana	37–60	South Africa

22 August 2022	Zimbabwe	49–41	Botswana

22 August 2022	South Africa	66–38	Namibia

23 August 2022	Namibia	41–45	Zimbabwe

23 August 2022	South Africa	58–30	Tanzania

24 August 2022	Namibia	43–45	Botswana

24 August 2022	Tanzania	33–43	Zimbabwe

25 August 2022	Botswana	54–45	Tanzania

25 August 2022	South Africa	64–47	Zimbabwe

== Pool B ==
=== Standings ===
Team	Pld	W	D	L	GF	GA	GD	Pts
Malawi	3	3	0	0	202	130	72	6
Zambia	3	2	0	1	159	141	18	4
Kenya	3	1	0	2	113	154	-41	2
Eswatini	3	0	0	3	136	185	-49	0

=== Matches ===
21 August 2022	Zambia	46–30	Kenya

22 August 2022	Malawi	69–50	Eswatini

23 August 2022	Zambia	64–50	Eswatini

23 August 2022	Kenya	31–72	Malawi

24 August 2022	Kenya	52–36	Eswatini

25 August 2022	Malawi	61–49	Zambia

== Placement matches and finals ==
=== 7th-9th place ===
25 August 2022	Tanzania	42–58	Eswatini

26 August 2022	Namibia	47-46	Tanzania

26 August 2022	Namibia	59-50	Eswatini

=== 5th-6th place ===
26 August 2022	Botswana	49–57	Kenya

=== Semi-finals ===
26 August 2022	Malawi	62-41	Zimbabwe

26 August 2022	South Africa	74-43	Zambia

=== 3rd/4th place ===
27 August 2022	Zambia	49-59	Zimbabwe

=== Final ===
27 August 2022	South Africa	60-44	Malawi

== Final placings ==
Place	Country
Gold	South Africa
Silver	Malawi
Bronze	Zimbabwe
4	Zambia
5	Kenya
6	Botswana
7	Namibia
8	Eswatini
9	Tanzania
