= Chrisna van Zyl =

South African netball player (born 1983)

Personal information
- Full name: Chrisna van Zyl (Née: Bootha)
- Born: 10 August 1983 (age 43) South Africa
- Height: 1.88 m (6 ft 2 in)

Netball career
- Playing positions: GS, GA
Years	National team	Caps
2009–present	South Africa	
Medal record
Representing South Africa
Fast5 Netball World Series
Bronze medal – third place	2012 Auckland	Team

Chrisna van Zyl (née Bootha; born 10 August 1983) is a South African netball player. Van Zyl plays in the positions of Goal Shooter (GS) and Goal Attack (GA). She is a member of the South Africa national netball team and has competed in the 2010 Commonwealth Games in Delhi and the 2011 World Netball Championships in Singapore, among many other tournaments. She has also participated in the 2010 World Netball Series and the 2011 World Netball Series, both held in Liverpool, UK. In October 2012, she travelled with the Proteas to participate in the 2012 Netball Quad Series.

In November 2012 she was a member of the Proteas Fast5 team in the 2012 Fast5 Netball World Series where she won a bronze medal. She scored several long range "Super Shots" throughout the tournament, a major reason for the Proteas success.

== Playing history ==
Year(s)	Team
1999	U/16 S.A Schools
2000	S.A U/17
2003-2004	COSANA Swaziland
2004-2009	SPAR Proteas Squad
2009	Tri-Nations vs Fiji & Botswana
2009	COSANA Games Durban
2010	Test Series vs Samoa
2010	AFRICA WNC Qualifying Round
2010	Commonwealth Games New Delhi
2010	FAST5 World Netball Series Liverpool
2011	Tri-Nations vs Botswana & Singapore
2011	Test Series vs Trinidad & Tobago
