= Netball South Africa Diamond Challenge =

International netball tournament hosted by South Africa

- Current season, competition or edition: 2022 SPAR Diamond Challenge
- Sport: Netball
- First season: 2012
- Country: South Africa
- Most recent champion: South Africa (7th title)
- Most titles: South Africa (7 titles)
- Broadcaster: SuperSport
- Website: Diamond Challenge Archive

The Netball South Africa Diamond Challenge is an international netball series hosted by Netball South Africa. The series traditionally features South Africa playing a series of test matches against mostly visiting African national teams. South Africa won the inaugural 2012 series.

== History ==
=== COSANA Games ===
The Diamond Challenge series effectively replaced the COSANA Games, a series of tournaments hosted by the Confederation of Southern African Netball Associations which were held biannually up until 2009.

=== President's XII ===
As well as entering their senior national team in the Diamond Challenge series, Netball South Africa has also entered an invitational team known as the President's XII. It is effectively a South Africa B team. In 2016, with a team featuring Ine-Marí Venter and Marlize de Bruin, they finished second in the group stage. However, as an unranked team they are not allowed to play in the final of an official tournament. This happened again in 2022 and they were eventually placed third. In 2018, with a team coached by Jenny van Dyk and featuring Lefébre Rademan and a returning Marlize de Bruin, they effectively finished second overall.

== Results ==
=== 3rd v 4th Playoff ===
Tournament	3rd	Score	4th	Host city
2012	Botswana	45–36	Zambia	Pretoria
2013	Zambia	^{(Note 1)}		Port Elizabeth
2015	Uganda	53–52	Zambia	Margate
2016	(South Africa) President's XII	54–54	Uganda	Durban
2018	Zambia	^{(Note 2)}	Zimbabwe	Seshego, Polokwane
2021	Namibia	^{(Note 3)}		Cape Town
2022	(South Africa) President's XII	49–43	Zimbabwe	Pretoria

=== Finals ===
Tournament	Winners	Score	Runners up	Host city
2012	South Africa	47–43	Malawi	Pretoria
2013	South Africa	59–45	Zimbabwe	Port Elizabeth
2015	South Africa	40–35	Malawi	Margate
2016	South Africa	68–34	Zimbabwe	Durban
2018	South Africa	^{(Note 2)}	(South Africa) President's XII	Seshego, Polokwane
2021	South Africa	^{(Note 3)}	Uganda	Cape Town
2022	South Africa	54–36	Scotland	Pretoria

Notes

- ^1 In 2013, only three teams entered, so there was no 3rd v 4th playoff.
- ^2 In 2018, there was no play-offs or finals. Some sources credit Zambia with second place.
- ^3 In 2021, there was no play-offs or finals.
