= Vanes-Mari du Toit =

South African netball player

Personal information
- Full name: Vanes-Mari du Toit
- Born: 2 August 1989 (age 36) Pretoria, South Africa
- Height: 1.89 m (6 ft 2 1/2 in)
- School: Afrikaanse Hoër Meisieskool
- University: University of Pretoria

Netball career
Years	National team	Caps
5 years	South Africa	38
	South African Fast5 Team	36
Medal record
Representing South Africa
World University Netball Championship
Silver medal – second place	2012 Cape Town	Team
Fast5 Netball World Series
Bronze medal – third place	2012 Auckland	Team

Vanes-Mari du Toit (born 2 August 1989) is a South African former netball player. She was a member of the South Africa national team and has 38 caps.

She competed in the 2011 World Netball Championships in Singapore. She has also participated in the 2011 World Netball Series in Liverpool. In October 2012, she travelled with the Proteas to Australia and New Zealand to participate in the Quad Series tournament.

In November 2012 she was a member of the Proteas Fast5 team in the 2012 Fast5 Netball World Series where she won a bronze medal. She is the current Vice-Captain of the South African Fast5 Team and the most capped South African Fast5 Netball player with 36 Caps.

She was linked to the Southern Steel for the 2013 season, but ultimately was not signed. She then joined the Adelaide Thunderbirds during pre season training in Australia with the prospect of being their signed import player, but their current import player Carla Borrego did not receive her citizenship in time, and du Toit returned to South Africa to finish her degree in Human resource management at the University of Pretoria.

She played for Yorkshire Jets during the 2016 Netball Superleague season. She was included again in the South Africa team for the 2016 Diamond Challenge.

In early 2018, du Toit was a contestant on Dancing with the Stars SA. Her dancing partner was Johannes Radebe and they made it to the semi-finals.

In the 2018 Brutal Fruit Netball Cup season, she played for North West Flames.
