= South Africa national netball team =

National netball team

South Africa
- South Africa netball crest
- Nickname(s): Spar Proteas
- Association: Netball South Africa
- Confederation: Africa Netball
- Head coach: Jenny van Dyk
- Captain: Khanyisa Chawane
- Most caps: Bongiwe Msomi (171)
- World ranking: 5
| Team colours | Alternate |

Netball World Cup
- Appearances: 10 (Debuted in 1963)
- 2023 placing: 6th
- Best result: 2nd (1995)

Commonwealth Games
- Appearances: 7 (Debuted in 1998)
- 2026 placing: 5th
- Best result: 4th (1998)

The South Africa national netball team, also known as the SPAR Proteas, represent Netball South Africa in international netball tournaments, such as the Netball World Cup, the Commonwealth Games, the Netball Quad Series and the Fast5 Netball World Series. Their best result in a major tournament is a silver medal at the 1995 World Netball Championships. As of 1 March 2024, South Africa are currently fifth in the World Netball Rankings.

== History ==
=== Early tests ===
In 1956, South Africa hosted a touring England. The tour featured a series of three Tests, with England winning all three. In 1959 South Africa toured England for the first time, winning 18 out of 25 matches. However, they once again lost all three Test matches against England.

== Tournament history ==
=== Major tournaments ===
==== Netball World Cup ====
South Africa made their Netball World Cup debut at the inaugural 1963 tournament. Despite victories over Scotland, the West Indies, Wales and Ceylon, they finished sixth. In 1967 they were bronze medalists. However, between 1971 and 1991, South Africa was unable to compete because of the sporting boycott during the apartheid era. In 1995, South Africa returned and with an all-white team coached by Marlene Wagner, captained by Debbie Hamman and featuring Irene van Dyk and Elize Kotze, they finished as silver medalists. During the tournament they defeated both England and New Zealand before losing in the final to Australia. In 1996 Wagner, Hamman and van Dyk were all honoured by President Nelson Mandela personally. South Africa hosted the 2023 Netball World Cup.

| Tournaments | Place |
|---|---|
| 1963 World Netball Tournament | 6th |
| 1967 World Netball Tournament | 3rd place, bronze medalist(s) |
| 1995 World Netball Championships | 2nd place, silver medalist(s) |
| 1999 World Netball Championships | 5th |
| 2003 World Netball Championships | 5th |
| 2007 World Netball Championships | 6th |
| 2011 World Netball Championships | 5th |
| 2015 Netball World Cup | 5th |
| 2019 Netball World Cup | 4th |
| 2023 Netball World Cup | 6th |
| 2027 Netball World Cup | |

==== Commonwealth Games ====
South Africa have competed at every netball tournament at the Commonwealth Games. They have never medaled at the Commonwealth Games. Their highest finish in the event came in 1998 when they finished 4th, after losing the bronze medal match to England 56–54. Ahead of the 2022 Commonwealth Games, Netball South Africa awarded 24 players professional contracts for the first time. They included Khanyisa Chawane, Marlize de Bruin, Izette Griesel, Phumza Maweni, Bongiwe Msomi, Lenize Potgieter, Karla Pretorius, Lefebre Rademan, Nichole Taljaard, Shadine van der Merwe, Ine-Marí Venter and Zanele Vimbela.

| Tournaments | Place |
|---|---|
| 1998 Commonwealth Games | 4th |
| 2002 Commonwealth Games | 5th |
| 2006 Commonwealth Games | 7th |
| 2010 Commonwealth Games | 6th |
| 2014 Commonwealth Games | 6th |
| 2018 Commonwealth Games | 5th |
| 2022 Commonwealth Games | 6th |

==== Netball Quad Series/Nations Cup ====
Since 2012, South Africa have competed in the Netball Quad Series, playing against Australia, England and New Zealand.

| Tournaments | Place |
|---|---|
| 2012 Netball Quad Series | 4th |
| 2016 Netball Quad Series | 4th |
| 2017 Netball Quad Series (January/February) | 4th |
| 2017 Netball Quad Series (August/September) | 4th |
| 2018 Netball Quad Series (January) | 4th |
| 2018 Netball Quad Series (September) | 4th |
| 2019 Netball Quad Series | 4th |
| 2020 Netball Nations Cup | 4th |
| 2022 Netball Quad Series | 4th |
| 2023 Netball Quad Series | 4th |
| 2025 Netball Nations Cup | 2nd |

==== Taini Jamison Trophy Series ====
| Tournaments | Place |
|---|---|
| 2015 Taini Jamison Trophy Series | 2nd |
| 2025 Taini Jamison Trophy Series | 2nd |

==== Fast5 Netball World Series ====
Since 2010, when they made their debut in the second tournament, South Africa has competed at every Fast5 Netball World Series. South Africa’s best performance in the series was in 2022, when they gained a silver medal after losing to Australia in the final. Their best previous performance was a third place finish in 2012.

| Tournaments | Place |
|---|---|
| 2010 World Netball Series | 6th |
| 2011 World Netball Series | 5th |
| 2012 Fast5 Netball World Series | 3rd place, bronze medalist(s) |
| 2013 Fast5 Netball World Series | 6th |
| 2014 Fast5 Netball World Series | 5th |
| 2016 Fast5 Netball World Series | 6th |
| 2017 Fast5 Netball World Series | 5th |
| 2018 Fast5 Netball World Series | 6th |
| 2022 Fast5 Netball World Series | 2nd place, silver medalist(s) |
| 2023 Fast5 Netball World Series | 4th |
| 2024 Fast5 Netball World Series | 4th |

=== African tournaments ===
South Africa also competes in competitions against other African national teams. These include the Africa Netball Cup, the Diamond Challenge, tournaments at the All-Africa Games and Netball World Cup qualifiers.

==== All-Africa Games ====
At the 1995 World Netball Championships, South Africa had featured only white players. At the 1995 All-Africa Games, officials requested that South Africa include six non-white players. This saw six members from the silver medal winning squad dropped and replaced. The six remaining white players subsequently withdrew on 1 September, protesting that the team was not selected by merit. So on 6 September a totally new squad was named.

| Tournaments | Place |
|---|---|
| 1995 All-Africa Games | 1st place, gold medalist(s) |
| 1999 All-Africa Games | 1st place, gold medalist(s) |
| 2011 All-Africa Games | 6th |

==== Africa Netball Cup ====
| Tournaments | Place |
|---|---|
| 2013 African Netball Championship | 1st |
| 2019 Africa Netball Cup | 1st |
| 2021 Africa Netball Cup | 1st |
| 2024 Africa Netball Cup | 1st |

==== Netball South Africa Diamond Challenge ====
Since 2012, Netball South Africa has hosted the Diamond Challenge. The trophy is contested with mainly visiting African national teams.

| Tournaments | Place |
|---|---|
| 2012 Diamond Challenge | 1st |
| 2013 Diamond Challenge | 1st |
| 2015 Diamond Challenge | 1st |
| 2016 Diamond Challenge | 1st |
| 2018 Diamond Challenge | 1st |
| 2021 SPAR Challenge Series | 1st |
| 2022 SPAR Diamond Challenge | 1st |

==== Netball World Cup qualifiers ====
| Tournaments | Place |
|---|---|
| 2006 COSANA Games | 2nd |
| 2011 World Netball Championships Qualifier | 1st |
| 2023 Netball World Cup qualification – Africa | 1st |

=== Netball Europe Open Championships ===
| Tournaments | Place |
|---|---|
| 2015 Netball Europe Open Championships | 2nd |

== Notable players ==
=== Current squad ===
The current squad was selected for the 2025 Taini Jamison Trophy Series and the 2025 Australia South Africa netball series.

South Africa roster
Players
Coaches

| Name | Pos | DOB | Height | Club | Nat | Caps |
|---|---|---|---|---|---|---|
| Nicholé Breedt | GA,WA | 3 May 1997 (aged 28) | 1.77 m (5 ft 10 in) | Southern Stings | (South Africa) |
| Khanyisa Chawane (c) | WD,C,WA | 14 January 1996 (aged 29) | 1.67 m (5 ft 6 in) | Cardiff Dragons | (Wales) |
| Entle Futshane | GK,GD,WD | | 1.77 m (5 ft 10 in) | Southern Stings | (South Africa) |
| Kamogelo Maseko | GA, WA | 30 March 2002 (aged 23) | 1.79 m (5 ft 10 in) | London Pulse | (England) |
| Tarle Mathe | WD,C | 9 August 2004 (aged 21) | 1.71 m (5 ft 7 in) | Gauteng Golden Fireballs | (South Africa) |
| Owethu Ngubane | GS, GA | 19 April 2002 (aged 23) | 1.81 m (5 ft 11 in) | Birmingham Panthers | (England) |
| Refiloe Nketsa | WD,C | 15 May 1995 (aged 30) | 1.75 m (5 ft 9 in) | Free State Crinums | (South Africa) |
| Nozipho Ntshangase | GK,GD,WD | 31 October 1998 (aged 26) | 1.79 m (5 ft 10 in) | Kingdom Stars | (South Africa) |
| Nicola Smith | GK,GD | 25 April 2000 (aged 25) | 1.88 m (6 ft 2 in) | Manchester Thunder | (England) |
| Rolene Streutker | GS | 20 October 2000 (aged 24) | 1.86 m (6 ft 1 in) | Nottingham Forest Netball | (England) |
| Elmeré van der Berg | GS, GA | 9 April 2001 (aged 24) | 1.91 m (6 ft 3 in) | Adelaide Thunderbirds | (Australia) |
| Jamie Golob (vc) | GD,WD | 21 October 2000 (aged 26) | 1.83 m (6 ft 0 in) | London Mavericks | (England) |
| Juanita van Tonder | GK | | 1.84 m (6 ft 0 in) | Eastern Cape Aloes | (South Africa) |
| Karla Victor | C, WA | | – | Free State Crinums | (South Africa) |
| Sanmarie Visser | GK,GD,WD | 23 September 2003 (aged 21) | 1.84 m (6 ft 0 in) | Adelaide Thunderbirds | (Australia) |
| Kyla Dames | WA, C | | – | Gauteng Jaguars | (South Africa) |

Head coach

- Jenny van Dyk

Assistant coach

- Zanele Mdodana

Manager: Vinolia Austin
Physiotherapist:
Motheo Selebedi
Doctor: Lindi Mokwena

Notes

- (c) – Captain
- (cc) – Co-captain
- (vc) – Vice-captain
- – Injury / maternity leave
- (TRP) – Temporary Replacement Player

=== Captains ===
| Years | Captains |
|---|---|
| 1963 | Helen Stadler |
| 1967 | Doreen Otto |
| 1995 | Debbie Hamman |
| 1999–2000 | Irene van Dyk |
| 2003 | Elsje Jordaan |
| 2003–2005 | Martha Mosoahle |
| 2006 | Charlene Hertzog |
| 2007 | Bronwyn Bock-Jonathan |
| 2008–2010 | Liezel Wium |
| 2010–2012 | Amanda Mynhardt |
| 2011 | Precious Mthembu |
| 2012 | Zanele Mdodana |
| 2013–2016 | Maryka Holtzhausen |
| 2016–2023 | Bongiwe Msomi |
| 2024– | Khanyisa Chawane |

=== Most-capped internationals ===
| Player | Appearances | Years |
|---|---|---|
| Bongiwe Msomi | 171 | 2011–2023 |
| Phumza Maweni | 121 | 2014–2023 |
| Erin Burger | 120 | 2007–2019 |
| Maryka Holtzhausen | 116 | 2007–2019 |
| Karla Pretorius | 100 | 2011– |
| Precious Mthembu | 97 | 2007–2022 |

=== New Zealand internationals ===
Both Irene van Dyk and Leana de Bruin played for South Africa before switching nationalities and going onto represent New Zealand.

| Player | SA Appearances | Years | NZ Appearances | Years |
|---|---|---|---|---|
| Leana de Bruin | 34 | | 104 | 2003–2016 |
| Irene van Dyk | 72 | 1994–2000 | 145 | 2000–2014 |

== Head coaches ==
| Years | Coaches |
|---|---|
| 1992–1999 | Marlene Wagner |
| 1999–2000 | Bennie Saayman |
| 1999–2003 | Louise du Plessis |
| 2003–2006 | Marlene Wagner |
| 2008–2011 | Carin Strauss |
| 2011 | Marchelle Maroun |
| 2011–2015 | Elize Kotze |
| 2015 | Bennie Saayman |
| 2015–2017 | Norma Plummer |
| 2016–2017 | Elsje Jordaan |
| 2018–2019 | Norma Plummer |
| 2019–2022 | Dorette Badenhorst |
| 2022–2023 | Norma Plummer |
| 2024– | Jenny van Dyk |

== Main sponsors ==
| Years | Sponsors |
|---|---|
| 2000– | SPAR |

== Honours ==
- Africa Netball Cup
  - Winners: 2013, 2019, 2021, 2024
- All-Africa Games
  - Winners: 1995, 1999
- Diamond Challenge
  - Winners: 2012, 2013, 2015, 2016, 2018, 2021, 2022
- World Netball Championships/Netball World Cup
  - Runners Up: 1995
- Netball Quad Series/Nations Cup
  - Runners Up: 2025
- Taini Jamison Trophy
  - Runners Up: 2015, 2025
- Fast5 Netball World Series
  - Runners up: 2022
- Netball Europe Open Championships
  - Runners Up: 2015
