= Zambia national netball team =

Netball team

Zambia
- Association: Netball Association of Zambia
- Confederation: Africa Netball
- Head coach: Lazarous Tembo
- Asst coach: Martha Kafupi
- Manager: Carol Moono
- Captain: Beauty Nakazwe
- Vice-captain: Beenzu Nawa
- Top scorer: Diana Banda
- World ranking: 15
Team colours

The Zambia national netball team represent Zambia in international netball competition, and are governed by the Netball Association of Zambia (NAZ). Zambia won their first international medal when they placed third at the 2011 All-Africa Games in Mozambique. In 2012, they won silver at the Confederation of African Netball Associations (CANA) tournament in Zanzibar, bronze at the COSANA Africa Cup in Tanzania and another bronze at the Diamond Challenge in South Africa.

Zambia made their debut on the INF World Rankings in October 2012, placing 22nd. As of 21 July 2019, they are ranked 15th in the world, and 5th in Africa. Charles Zulu was appointed head coach of the Zambian team in April 2012, replacing Davies Twininge.

== Players ==
=== 2015 Zambia Netball World Cup Team ===
Zambia national netball team
Players	Coaching staff
Memory Musonda; Elizabeth Bwalya; Harriet Muchuma; Justina Mwale; Ethel Pamba; Memory Mushanga; Beenzu Nawa; Diana Namutowe; Beauty Nakazwe (c); Esther Kunda; Gift Bunga; Candy Ng'ambi	Head coach: Lazarous Tembo

== Competitive record ==
Netball World Cup
Year	Championship	Location	Placing
1999	10th World Championships	Christchurch, New Zealand	17th
2003	11th World Championships	Kingston, Jamaica	DNQ
2007	12th World Championships	Auckland, New Zealand	DNQ
2011	13th World Championships	Singapore	DNQ
2015	14th World Cup	Sydney, Australia	14th
