= Zanele Vimbela =

South African netball player

Personal information
- Born: 28 April 1989 (age 37) Johannesburg, RSA
- Height: 1.82 m (6 ft 0 in)
- School: Aliwal North High School
- University: Nelson Mandela University

Netball career
- Playing position: GK / GD

Zanele Vimbela (born 28 April 1989) is a South African netball player. She has featured for the South Africa national netball team on several occasions, most notably in the 2014 Commonwealth Games and 2018 Commonwealth Games, as well as the 2019 Netball World Cup.
