= Izette Griesel =

South African netball player

Personal information
- Nationality: South African
- Born: 12 July 1992 (age 33) Pretoria, South Africa
- Height: 180 cm (5 ft 11 in)

Sport
- Sport: Netball
Medal record
Representing South Africa
World University Netball Championship
Gold medal – first place	2016 Miami	Team

Izette Griesel (born 12 July 1992) is a South African netball player. She was selected to represent the South African netball team at the 2019 Netball World Cup.
