= Norma Plummer =

Australian netball player and coach

Norma Plummer AM
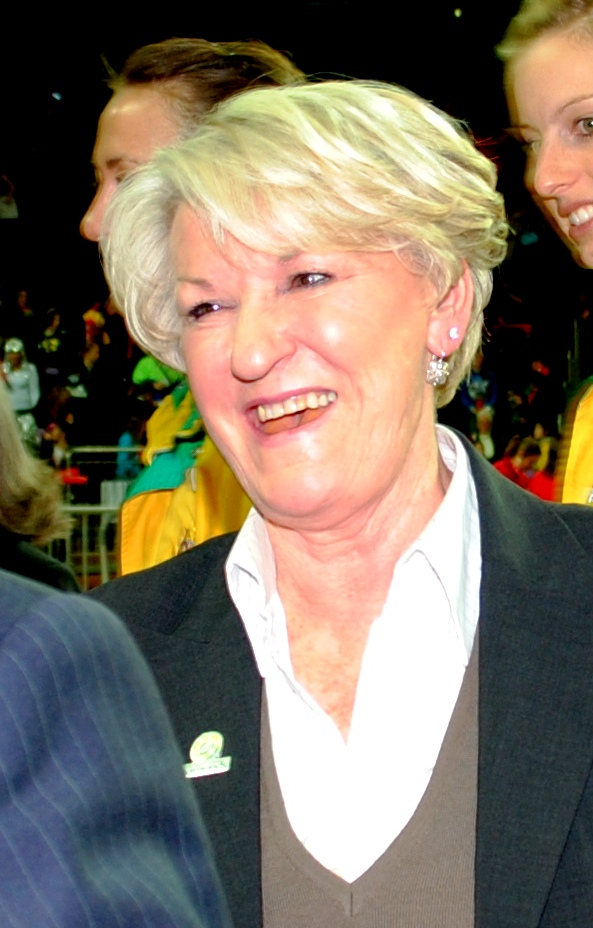

Personal information
- Full name: Norma Margaret Plummer
- Born: 24 November 1944 (age 81) Carlton, Victoria
- Occupation: Netball coach

Netball career
Years	National team	Caps
1972–1981	Australia	
Coaching career
- Years: Team
- 199x–1996: Melbourne Pumas
- 1996–1998: Melbourne Phoenix
- 1999–2003: Australian Institute of Sport
- 2003–2011: Australia
- 2012–2014: West Coast Fever
- 2015–2019: South Africa
- 2022-2023: South Africa
Medal record
Representing Australia
World Netball Tournament
Gold medal – first place	1975 Auckland	Netball
- Updated on May 2025

Norma Margaret Plummer AM (born 24 November 1944) is a former Australian national player who also served as netball coach for both Australia and South Africa. She was coach of Australia from 2003 to 2011, ending her coaching career with the Diamonds on 67 victories from 89 Tests — a success rate of 75 per cent. She was appointed a Member of the Order of Australia for her services to the sport. In November 2022 it was announced she would be returning to South Africa to coach the South Africa national netball side the Spar Proteas starting in 2022. The announcement came ahead of the 2023 Netball World Cup that is currently held in South Africa.

In 2015, she was inducted into the Australian Netball Hall of Fame, and in 2025, she was elevated to the Legends Club at the Netball Australia Awards.

== Early career ==
Norma Plummer began her career in 1967 and represented Australian Diamonds in 1972 with whom she spent a decade which includes the win at the 1975 World Netball Tournament in New Zealand.

She had a long and successful career as an Australian representative netballer, including a four-Test stint as national captain in 1978. After some time as playing coach of her state league team, Plummer embarked on a successful coaching career, coaching the Victorian state team to several victories at the national netball championships which was followed by her retirement from the team in 1982. and coaching the Melbourne Pumas in the Esso/Mobil Superleague.

After the Mobil Superleague was disbanded in favour of the new Commonwealth Bank Trophy, Plummer became the founding coach of the new Melbourne Phoenix team, which took many of the players from the former Pumas, and successfully coached them to the inaugural premiership. She was also appointed coach of the Australian youth team and took them to several successes. She subsequently resigned as coach of the Phoenix at the beginning of the 1999 season in order to take up a position as head netball coach at the Australian Institute of Sport. While in this role, she was integral in the campaign to add the AIS Canberra Darters to the national competition.

== National coach ==
=== Australia ===
After several years as coach of the national youth team, and having been rumoured for the head national coach position since the late 1980s, Plummer was a likely choice when Jill McIntosh resigned in July 2003, and she subsequently took the reins of the national team in late August. In her nearly three years as coach for the Australian team, she retained her reputation as a top coach, even with a downturn in the team's fortunes in 2005.

In June 2006 after the silver medal in March at the Commonwealth Games Norma Plummer led her young team to victory in all Test Match Series in 2006 & 2007 and in November 2007 won the World Championships in Auckland, New Zealand.

In 2008 Plummer's team Australian Diamonds, had beaten Silver Ferns 53 to 51 at the Horncastle Arena and two years later won a silver medal at the 2010 Commonwealth Games in New Delhi. She also coached Australian national team at the 2011 Netball World Championships in Singapore.

Norma has announced that she will be coaching the West Coast Fever for season 2012, where she remained until 2014.

In the 2013 Australia Day Honours, Plummer was appointed a Member of the Order of Australia (AM), "for significant service to the sport of netball as a coach and representative player."

In 2014, after a 66–65 loss by her team West Coast Fever, which was playing in Dunedin at that time, a resident of the city had made death threats towards her on her personal webpage.

=== South Africa ===
In June 2015 Plummer became the head coach of the South Africa national netball team.

In 2018, Plummer had revealed that although she doesn't have a signed contract with the Netball South Africa, she will lead its national team to greatness at the 2019 Netball World Cup in Liverpool. She stepped down as the coach of South African team following the 2019 World Cup where South Africa ended up at fourth position.

Plummer returned to South Africa in 2022 as a mentor and advisor for the 2022 Commonwealth Games. After the games she was appointed as interim coach and lead the team through the 2023 Netball World Cup in Cape Town, where the team finished 6th. Following the conclusion of the 2023 Vitality Netball Series between England and South Africa she announced she would be stepping down.
