= Lenize Potgieter =

South African netball player

Personal information
- Born: 2 May 1994 (age 32) Polokwane, South Africa
- Occupation: Netball player
- Height: 1.88 m (6 ft 2 in)
- School: Die Hoërskool Menlopark
- University: University of Pretoria

Netball career
- Playing positions: GS, GA
| Years | Club team | Apps |
| 2016 | Team Bath | |
| 2017–18 | Waikato Bay of Plenty Magic | |
| 2019 | Southern Steel Queensland Firebirds | |
| 2020 - 2022 | Adelaide Thunderbirds | |
| 2023 | Manchester Thunder | |
| Years | National team | Caps |
| 2014–present | South Africa | 39 |

Lenize Potgieter (born 2 May 1994) is a South African professional netball player who last played Garville netball club in 2023. Previously, she played for Manchester Thunder and the South African national team.

== Early life ==
Potgieter was born in Polokwane, Limpopo before moving to Pretoria to pursue her high school career at Hoërskool Menlopark and further her studies and netball career. She has played netball for the past seventeen years.

== Career ==
Lenize has represented her province of Limpopo at respective provincial netball tournaments. She played for the Gauteng Jaguars in the Brutal Fruit Netball Cup for three years as well as represented her university in the local varsity championship. Also, she earned her first international cap in the 2014 Commonwealth Games. Potgieter was also in the Spar Proteas squad that competed against the Silver Ferns in the 2015 Taini Jamison Trophy Series whereby she displayed some excellent netball and earned the MVP award despite the Spar Proteas losing to the world ranked number two. She also got selected to represent her country at the 2015 Netball World Cup whereby the Spar Proteas finished in fifth. The following year she got signed by Team Bath in the Netball Superleague before being snapped up by Waikato Bay of Plenty Magic of the ANZ Premiership in 2017. She stayed at Waikato for two seasons before moving to Southern Steel ahead of the 2019 season. At the end of the 2019 ANZ Premiership season, Potgieter was signed by the Queensland Firebirds as an injury replacement player for the rest of the Australian domestic season. On 21 June 2019, it was announced Potgieter will be playing for Adelaide Thunderbirds in the 2020 season. At the end of the 2022 season, Potgeiter's contract with Adelaide Thunderbirds was not renewed.

Potgieter was signed by Netball Super League side Manchester Thunder prior to the start of the 2023 season.
