= Phumza Maweni =

South African netball player (born 1984)

Personal information
- Born: 4 September 1984 (age 41) Cala, Eastern Cape, RSA
- Height: 1.87 m (6 ft 2 in)

Netball career
- Playing positions: GK, GD
| Years | Club team | Apps |
| 2014 | Kingdom Stars | |
| 2015 | Loughborough Lightning | |
| 2016–17 | Southern Stings | |
| 2018 | Severn Stars | |
| 2019–2021 | Sunshine Coast Lightning | |
| 2022 | Team Bath Netball | |

Phumza Maweni (born September 4, 1984) is a South African netball player in the Netball Superleague in the UK, representing Team Bath Netball.

Maweni was raised in Cala, in the Eastern Cape of South Africa. She went on to compete for the Kingdom Stars and Southern Stings in the South African Brutal Fruit Netball Cup and has also played several seasons in England's Netball Superleague, first for the Loughborough Lightning and later for the Severn Stars. Maweni's exceptional form in the local South African league led to national team coach Norma Plummer calling on her to be signed by foreign clubs in higher profile leagues. She has featured for the South Africa national netball team on several occasions, most notably in the 2018 Commonwealth Games.

She was signed by the Sunshine Coast Lightning in Australia ahead of the 2019 season and spent three seasons with the Suncorp Super Netball club, playing all 47 matches. She then signed for Team Bath Netball in England in December 2021 and will play for them during the 2022 Superleague season.
