= Netball in South Africa =

- Country: South Africa
- Governing body: Netball South Africa
- National team: South Africa
- First played: Early 1900s

Netball in South Africa is organised by Netball South Africa. The South Africa national netball team regularly competes in international netball competitions such as the Netball World Cup, Netball at the Commonwealth Games, the Netball Quad Series and the Fast5 Netball World Series. South Africa has hosted several major international tournaments including the 2023 Netball Quad Series and 2023 Netball World Cup. The two main competitions for netball teams in South Africa are the Premier Netball League and Varsity Netball.

== History ==
=== Early years ===
According to records from the Cape Town Teachers Training College, netball was played there by 1917. There is photographic evidence suggesting it might have been played as early as 1905. Initially netball was played in schools, not clubs. Newspaper accounts reveal that the game was occasionally played in Black South African school communities after the First World War. By the 1930s and 1940s many black teacher training colleges in and around Cape Town had netball teams. Zonnebloem College recorded a match in 1932 and Wesley College in 1933. In 1936, the Athlone Institute in Paarl held netball games against Battswood College. In 1941, a report was found of an inter-class netball tournament at Söhnge College in Worcester. The same year, St Augustine's College in Parow registered a netball team in a club competition. Media reports mention matches between these colleges and schools in villages such as Genadendal and Malmesbury. Matches were also played between colleges and staff from Somerset Hospital in Cape Town.

== Governing bodies ==
In 1951, the all-white South African Women's Netball Association was established. In 1957, their president represented South Africa at the inaugural International Netball Conference in London. In 1960, South Africa were founder members of the International Federation of Netball Associations. In 1992, with the end of the sporting boycott during the apartheid era, Netball South Africa became the new governing body for netball in South Africa. It is affiliated to World Netball and Africa Netball. It is responsible for organising and administering the South Africa national netball team, the South Africa men's national netball team, the Diamond Challenge and the Premier Netball League, as well as numerous other leagues and competitions for junior and youth teams. Its headquarters are based in Arcadia, Pretoria.

== National teams ==
=== Women ===
In 1956, South Africa hosted a touring England. The tour featured a series of three Tests, with England winning all three. In 1959 South Africa toured England for the first time, winning 18 out of 25 matches. This included a 31–8 win over Scotland. However, they once again lost all three Test matches against England. South Africa made their World Netball Championships/Netball World Cup debut at the inaugural 1963 tournament and finished sixth. In 1967 they were bronze medalists. However, between 1971 and 1991, South Africa was unable to compete because of the sporting boycott during the apartheid era. In 1995, South Africa returned and with an all-white team coached by Marlene Wagner, captained by Debbie Hamman and featuring Irene van Dyk and Elize Kotze, they finished as silver medalists. During the tournament they defeated both England and New Zealand before losing in the final to Australia. In 1996 Wagner, Hamman and van Dyk were all honoured by President Nelson Mandela personally.

| Debut | Tournament | Best result |
|---|---|---|
| 1963 | Netball World Cup | 2nd (1995) |
| 1995 | Africa Netball Cup | 1st |
| 1998 | Netball at the Commonwealth Games | 4th (1998) |
| 2010 | Fast5 Netball World Series | 2nd (2022) |
| 2012 | Netball Quad Series | 2nd (2025) |
| 2012 | Netball South Africa Diamond Challenge | 1st |

=== Men ===
The South Africa men's national netball team represents Netball South Africa in international men's netball competitions, including the Men's Africa Netball Cup and the Men's Fast5 Netball World Series.

== International tournaments ==
Netball South Africa has hosted the following international tournaments.

Tournaments
Netball South Africa Diamond Challenge
2012 World University Netball Championship
2019 Africa Netball Cup
2019 South Africa England netball series
2023 Netball Quad Series
2023 Netball World Cup

== Venues ==
| Venue | Hosted |
|---|---|
| Bellville Velodrome | 2019 Africa Netball Cup, 2019 South Africa England netball series |
| Cape Town International Convention Centre | 2021 SPAR Challenge Series, 2023 Netball Quad Series and 2023 Netball World Cup |
| Ellis Park Arena | 2018 Netball Quad Series, Premier Netball League final. |
| Good Hope Centre | 2012 World University Netball Championship |
| Heartfelt Arena | 2012 Diamond Challenge, Premier Netball League finals. |
| Durban International Convention Centre | 2017 Netball Quad Series |

== Competitions ==
=== Premier Netball League ===
The Premier Netball League is the top level netball league featuring teams from South Africa. It was formed in 2014 and is organised by Netball South Africa. Between 2014 and 2018, due to sponsorship and naming rights arrangements, the league was known as the Brutal Fruit Netball Cup. Since 2019, the league has been sponsored by Telkom and, as a result, it is widely known as the Telkom Netball League. In 2014, Free State Crinums were the inaugural winners. Gauteng Jaguars are the league's most successful team. In 2023 they won their sixth titles. The league features two divisions and uses a promotion and relegation format. The winners of the Division B Shield can gain promotion to Division A by winning a play off.

==== Current teams ====
Division A

| Team | City/Suburb | Province |
|---|---|---|
| Eastern Cape Aloes | | Eastern Cape |
| Free State Crinums | University of the Free State | Free State |
| Gauteng Golden Fireballs | | Gauteng |
| Gauteng Jaguars | University of Pretoria | Gauteng |
| Kingdom Stars | Durban | KwaZulu-Natal |
| Southern Stings | | Western Cape |
| North West Flames | | North West |

Division B

| Team | City/Suburb | Province |
|---|---|---|
| Eastern Cape Comets | | Eastern Cape |
| Free State Sonoblomo | | Free State |
| Kingdom Queens | | KwaZulu-Natal |
| Limpopo Baobabs | Polokwane | Limpopo |
| Limpopo Lillies | | Limpopo |
| Mpumalanga Sunbirds | | Mpumalanga |
| Northern Cape Diamonds | | Northern Cape |
| North West Tshukudu | | North West |
| Western Cape Tornadoes | | Western Cape |

=== Varsity Netball ===
Varsity Netball is a netball league featuring teams representing universities in South Africa. It was formed in 2013. In 2013, UFS Kovsies won the inaugural tournament. With a team captained by Maryka Holtzhausen, they defeated NWU-Pukke 44–40 in the final. They won further titles in 2014, 2018, and 2021. In 2024, UFS Kovsies won their fifth title, after defeating UJ Netball 58–55 in the final. In 2017, after finishing as runners-up in 2014 and 2016, UP-Tuks won their first title. Their winning team was coached by Jenny van Dyk, captained by Shadine van der Merwe and featured Marlize de Bruin and Ine-Marí Venter. In the final, they defeated NWU-Pukke 43–41. In 2019, UP-Tuks won their second title, this time defeating Maties 48–43 in the final. In 2023, UP-Tuks won their third title after defeating UJ Netball 63–61 in the final.

==== Current teams ====
| Team | University | Home venue | TNL partner |
|---|---|---|---|
| UFS Kovsies Netball | University of the Free State | Callie Human Hall | Free State Crinums |
| UJ Netball | University of Johannesburg | | Gauteng Golden Fireballs |
| Madibaz Netball | Nelson Mandela University | Madibaz Sports Centre | Eastern Cape Aloes |
| NWU Netball Pukke | North-West University | NWU Mafikeng Great Hall | North West Flames |
| UP-Tuks Netball | University of Pretoria | Rembrandt Hall | Gauteng Jaguars |
| Maties Netball | Stellenbosch University | Coetzenburg Indoor Arena | |
| TUT Netball | Tshwane University of Technology | | |
| Wits Netball | University of the Witwatersrand | Wits Sports Hall | |
