= 2023 Netball Quad Series =

International netball series

Tournament details
- Host country: South Africa
- City: Cape Town
- Venue: Cape Town International Convention Centre
- Dates: 21–25 January 2023
- Teams: 4
- TV partner(s): Fox Sports/Kayo Freebies (Australia); Sky Sports (UK/Ireland); Sky Sport (New Zealand); SuperSport (South Africa)

Final positions
- Champions: Australia (8th title)
- Runners-up: New Zealand
- Third place: England

Tournament statistics
- Matches played: 8
- Top scorer(s): Grace Nweke; 166/180 (92%)

The 2023 Netball Quad Series was the ninth Netball Quad Series series. It was hosted by Netball South Africa. It featured Australia, England, New Zealand and South Africa playing each other in a series of eight netball test matches in January 2023. All eight matches were played at the Cape Town International Convention Centre. The series was effectively a test event for the 2023 Netball World Cup, which would be hosted at the same venue later in the year.

With a team coached by Stacey Marinkovich and captained by Liz Watson, Australia won the series, defeating New Zealand by 56–50 in the final. New Zealand's Grace Nweke was named as the Player of the Series. The series was broadcast live on Fox Sports and Kayo Freebies in Australia, on Sky Sports and Sky Sports YouTube in the United Kingdom and Ireland, on Sky Sport in New Zealand and on SuperSport (South Africa).

== Squads ==
Participating teams and rosters
Australia	England	New Zealand	South Africa
Sunday Aryang; Kiera Austin; Ash Brazill; Courtney Bruce; Sophie Dwyer; Sophie Garbin; Paige Hadley; Tara Hinchliffe; Sarah Klau; Cara Koenen; Kate Moloney; Jamie-Lee Price; Liz Watson (c); Steph Wood (vc)	Imogen Allison; Eleanor Cardwell; Jade Clarke; Sophie Drakeford-Lewis; Funmi Fadoju; Layla Guscoth; Alice Harvey; Helen Housby; Laura Malcolm; Elle McDonald; Natalie Metcalf (c); Geva Mentor; Chelsea Pitman; Olivia Tchine; Fran Williams	Karin Burger; Gina Crampton; Ameliaranne Ekenasio (c); Sulu Fitzpatrick; Kate Heffernan; Kelly Jury; Phoenix Karaka; Claire Kersten; Grace Nweke; Te Paea Selby-Rickit; Whitney Souness; Peta Toeava; Jane Watson; Maia Wilson	Khanyisa Chawane; Izette Griesel; Boitumelo Mahloko; Phumza Maweni; Nomfundo Mngomezulu; Bongiwe Msomi (c); Sesandile Ngubane; Refiloe Nketsa; Lenize Potgieter; Karla Pretorius; Monique Reyneke-Meyer; Nicholé Taljaard; Shadine van der Merwe (vc); Ine-Mari Venter; Zanele Vimbela
Coach: Stacey Marinkovich	Coach: Jess Thirlby	Coach: Noeline Taurua	Coach: Norma Plummer

Notes

- ^1 Jo Weston was included in the original Australia squad however she later withdrew due to injury and was replaced by Tara Hinchliffe.
- ^2 Jo Harten travelled with the England squad but withdrew due to injury.

== Milestones ==
- On 25 January 2023, Jade Clarke made her 200th senior appearance for England in the play off match against South Africa. She became the first international netball player to make 200 senior appearances for the same national netball team.
- Grace Nweke was named Player and Shooter of the series, Kate Heffernan named Mid-courter of the series and Courtney Bruce named defender of the series

== Match officials ==
Umpires

Umpire	Association
Bronwen Adams	Australia
Angela Armstrong-Lush	New Zealand
Joshua Bowring	Australia
Gary Burgess	England
Anso Kemp	South Africa
Alison Harrison	Wales

Umpire Appointments Panel

Umpire	Association
Marielouw Van der Merwe	South Africa
Heather Gleadall	England
Theresa Prince	South Africa

== Round-robin stage ==
=== Round 1 ===
21 January 2023	South Africa	41–61	New Zealand
16:00 (SAST UTC+2)	Lenize Potgieter 25/26 (96%); Nicolé Taljaard 13/15 (87%); Ine-Mari Venter 3/8 (38%)	Stats	Grace Nweke 42/44 (95%); Ameliaranne Ekenasio 11/15 (73%); Maia Wilson 8/12 (67%)

21 January 2022	Australia	61–55	England
18:00 (SAST UTC+2)	Sophie Garbin 46/51 (90%); Steph Wood 8/11 (73%); Kiera Austin 7/9 (78%)	Stats	Eleanor Cardwell 37/40 (93%); Helen Housby 16/21 (76%); Sophie Drakeford-Lewis 2/2 (100%)

=== Round 2 ===
22 January 2023	South Africa	46–46	England
16:00 (SAST UTC+2)	Olivia Tchine 19/22 (86%); Helen Housby 16/19 (84%); Sophie Drakeford-Lewis 11/11 (100%)	Stats	Lenize Potgieter 30/31 (97%); Nicolé Taljaard 16/20 (80%)

22 January 2023	Australia	59–57	New Zealand
18:00 (SAST UTC+2)	Cara Koenen 38/40 (95%); Steph Wood 21/24 (88%)		Grace Nweke 42/44 (95%); Maia Wilson 8/11 (73%); Ameliaranne Ekenasio 7/8 (88%)

=== Round 3 ===
24 January 2023	New Zealand	55–45	England
16:00 (SAST UTC+2)	Eleanor Cardwell 33/37 (89%); Helen Housby 12/14 (86%)		Grace Nweke 44/48 (92%); Ameliaranne Ekenasio 7/9 (78%); Te Paea Selby-Rickit 4/4 (100%)

24 January 2023	South Africa	48–65	Australia
18:00 (SAST UTC+2)	Ine-Mari Venter 29/36 (81%); Nicholé Taljaard 9/13 (69%); Lenize Potgieter 6/6 (100%); Sesandile Ngubane 4/6 (67%)	Stats	Sophie Garbin 32/36 (89%); Sophie Dwyer 13/15 (87%); Kiera Austin 11/13 (85%); Cara Koenen 9/9 (100%)

=== Table ===
Pos	Team	P	W	D	L	GF	GA	GD	%	Pts
1	Australia	3	3	0	0	185	160	+25	100.0	6
2	New Zealand	3	2	0	1	173	145	+28	75.0	4
3	England	3	0	1	2	146	162	-16	0.0	1
4	South Africa	3	0	1	2	135	172	-37	0.0	1

Qualified for Final
Qualified for 3rd/4th place match

== Playoffs ==
=== 3rd v 4th Playoff ===
25 January 2023	South Africa	42–49	England
16:00 (SAST UTC+2)	Lenize Potgieter 30/31 (97%); Ine-Mari Venter 2/2 (100%); Nicholé Taljaard 10/14 (71%)	Stats	Eleanor Cardwell 23/27 (85%); Helen Housby 17/19 (89%); Olivia Tchine 9/13 (69%)

=== Final ===
25 January 2023	Australia	56–50	New Zealand
18:00 (SAST UTC+2)	Cara Koenen 33/34 (97%); Steph Wood 23/28 (82%)		Grace Nweke 39/45 (87%); Ameliaranne Ekenasio 11/11 (100%)

== Award winners ==
Award	Winner	Team
Player of the Series	Grace Nweke	New Zealand
Best Shooter	Grace Nweke	New Zealand
Best Mid Court	Kate Heffernan	New Zealand
Best Defender	Courtney Bruce	Australia

== Final Placings ==
Rank	Team
1st place, gold medalist(s)	Australia
2nd place, silver medalist(s)	New Zealand
3rd place, bronze medalist(s)	England
4	South Africa
