= 2025 Taini Jamison Trophy Series =

International netball series

Tournament details
- Host country: New Zealand
- Dates: 21–28 September 2025
- Teams: 2
- TV partner(s): Sky Sport (New Zealand); SuperSport (South Africa); NetballPass

Final positions
- Champions: New Zealand (12th title)
- Runners-up: South Africa

Tournament statistics
- Matches played: 3
- Top scorer(s): Grace Nweke; 167/188 (89%)

The 2025 Taini Jamison Trophy Series, also known as the WM New Zealand Netball Series, was the 16th Taini Jamison Trophy series. It featured New Zealand playing South Africa in three netball test matches, played in September 2025. The series became involved in controversy when, just eleven days before the first test, New Zealand head coach, Noeline Taurua, was stood down by Netball New Zealand. Yvette McCausland-Durie was subsequently appointed as the interim coach for the series. Despite this, New Zealand won all three tests. Karin Burger captained New Zealand as they won the first test. Kelly Jackson captained New Zealand as they won the second test and clinched the series. In the same test, Grace Nweke put in a dominant performance, scoring 60 goals. Nweke captained New Zealand for the third test. South Africa put in their best performance of the series. However, Martina Salmon clinched a late win for New Zealand when she landed the winning goal with one second left. South Africa were coached by Jenny van Dyk and captained by Khanyisa Chawane. The series was broadcast live on Sky Sport in New Zealand, on SuperSport in South Africa and worldwide on NetballPass.

== Noeline Taurua controversy ==
On 10 September 2025, just eleven days before the first test against South Africa, Netball New Zealand announced that New Zealand head coach, Noeline Taurua, would be stood down for the series following concerns raised by a group of players. RNZ reported that the issue dated back to a January 2025 series of four away training matches played against New South Wales Swifts. Swifts are coached by Briony Akle, who was also a member of Taurua's coaching team. Following this series, two players approached the New Zealand Netball Players Association on behalf of a larger group of up to seven players to raise serious concerns about Taurua's leadership and communication style. Players alleged the environment had become "psychologically unsafe", describing a culture in which some felt fearful of raising issues directly with the head coach. Following a review, Taurua and her assistants, Debbie Fuller and Akle were temporarily stood down. Yvette McCausland-Durie was subsequently appointed as the interim coach for the series while Liana Leota was named as assistant coach. Following the presentation of the Taini Jamison Trophy to New Zealand, the acting captain for that match, Grace Nweke pleaded for the absent Taurua to return, declaring "Noels if you're listening, we love you and we miss you and we want you back here."

== Squads ==
=== New Zealand ===
New Zealand roster
Players
Coaches

Name	Pos	DOB	Height	Club	Nat	Caps
Karin Burger (cc)	WD, GD, GK	12 April 1993 (aged 32)	1.84 m (6 ft 0 in)	Mainland Tactix	(New Zealand)
Maddy Gordon	C, WA, WD	16 January 2000 (aged 25)	1.74 m (5 ft 9 in)	Central Pulse	(New Zealand)
Catherine Hall	GK,GD	16 December 2003 (age 22)	1.91 m (6 ft 3 in)	Northern Mystics	(New Zealand)
Georgia Heffernan	GS, GA	7 October 1999 (aged 25)	1.81 m (5 ft 11 in)	Southern Steel	(New Zealand)
Kate Heffernan	WD, C, WA	7 October 1999 (aged 25)	1.81 m (5 ft 11 in)	Southern Steel	(New Zealand)
Kelly Jackson (cc)	GK, GD	22 October 1996 (aged 28)	1.92 m (6 ft 4 in)	Central Pulse	(New Zealand)
Paris Mason	GK, GD, WD	13 December 2002 (aged 22)	1.84 m (6 ft 0 in)	Central Pulse	(New Zealand)
Grace Nweke (cc)	GS	7 February 2002 (aged 23)	1.93 m (6 ft 4 in)	New South Wales Swifts	(Australia)
Kimiora Poi	C, WA	1 November 1997 (aged 27)	1.68 m (5 ft 6 in)	Southern Steel	(New Zealand)
Mila Reulu-Buchanan	C, WA	11 May 1998 (aged 27)	1.73 m (5 ft 8 in)	Northern Stars	(New Zealand)
Martina Salmon	GS, GA		1.90 m (6 ft 3 in)	Mainland Tactix	(New Zealand)
Carys Stythe	GD, GK	June 18, 2003 (aged 22)	1.92 m (6 ft 4 in)	Southern Steel	(New Zealand)
Elisapeta Toeava	WA, C	10 March 1994 (aged 31)	1.61 m (5 ft 3 in)	Northern Mystics	(New Zealand)
Filda Vui	GS, GA, WA	16 April 1996 (aged 29)	1.80 m (5 ft 11 in)	Northern Mystics	(New Zealand)

Head coach

- Yvette McCausland-Durie

Assistant coach

- Liana Leota

Notes

- (c) – Captain
- (cc) – Co-captain
- (vc) – Vice-captain
- – Injury / maternity leave
- (TRP) – Temporary Replacement Player

Debuts

- Martina Salmon and Catherine Hall both made their senior debuts for New Zealand in the first test.
- Filda Vui made her senior debut for New Zealand in the second test.

=== South Africa ===
South Africa roster
Players
Coaches

Name	Pos	DOB	Height	Club	Nat	Caps
Nicholé Breedt	GA,WA	3 May 1997 (aged 28)	1.77 m (5 ft 10 in)	London Pulse	(England)
Khanyisa Chawane (c)	WD,C,WA	14 January 1996 (aged 29)	1.67 m (5 ft 6 in)	Cardiff Dragons	(Wales)
Entle Futshane	GK,GD,WD		1.77 m (5 ft 10 in)	Southern Stings	(South Africa)
Kamogelo Maseko	GA, WA	30 March 2002 (aged 23)	1.79 m (5 ft 10 in)	London Pulse	(England)
Tarle Mathe	WD,C,WA	9 August 2004 (aged 21)	1.71 m (5 ft 7 in)	Gauteng Golden Fireballs	(South Africa)
Owethu Ngubane	GS, GA	19 April 2002 (aged 23)	1.81 m (5 ft 11 in)	Gauteng Golden Fireballs	(South Africa)
Refiloe Nketsa	WD,C,WA	15 May 1995 (aged 30)	1.75 m (5 ft 9 in)	Free State Crinums	(South Africa)
Nozipho Ntshangase	GK,GD	31 October 1998 (aged 26)	1.79 m (5 ft 10 in)	Kingdom Stars	(South Africa)
Nicola Smith	GK,GD	25 April 2000 (aged 25)	1.88 m (6 ft 2 in)	Manchester Thunder	(England)
Rolene Streutker	GS	20 October 2000 (aged 24)	1.86 m (6 ft 1 in)	Nottingham Forest Netball	(England)
Elmeré van der Berg	GS, GA	9 April 2001 (aged 24)	1.91 m (6 ft 3 in)	Adelaide Thunderbirds	(Australia)
Shadine van der Merwe (vc)	GD,WD	25 November 1992 (aged 32)	1.81 m (5 ft 11 in)	Loughborough Lightning	(England)
Juanita van Tonder	GK		1.84 m (6 ft 0 in)	Eastern Cape Aloes	(South Africa)
Jamie van Wyk	GD	31 October 2000 (aged 24)	1.83 m (6 ft 0 in)	London Mavericks	(England)
Sanmarie Visser	GK,GD,WD	23 September 2003 (aged 21)	1.84 m (6 ft 0 in)	Leeds Rhinos	(England)

Head coach

- Jenny van Dyk

Assistant coach

- Zanele Mdodana

Manager: Vinolia Austin
Physiotherapist:
Motheo Selebedi
Doctor: Lindi Mokwena

Notes

- (c) – Captain
- (cc) – Co-captain
- (vc) – Vice-captain
- – Injury / maternity leave
- (TRP) – Temporary Replacement Player

Milestones

- Khanyisa Chawane made her 100th senior appearance for South Africa in the third test.

== Match officials ==
Umpires

Umpire	Association
Bronwen Adams	Australia
Caswell Palmer	Jamaica
Tracy-Ann Griffiths	Jamaica

Umpire Appointments Panel

Umpire	Association
Colleen Bond	New Zealand
Ann Hay	New Zealand

== Matches ==
=== First Test ===
Sunday, 21 September 2025; 19:40 NZST	Stats	New Zealand	77–51	South Africa	Eventfinda Stadium
Sunday, 21 September 2025; 19:40 NZST	Stats	Scoring by quarter: 20–8, 41–22, 58–35, 77–51			Eventfinda Stadium
Sunday, 21 September 2025; 19:40 NZST	Stats	Grace Nweke 58/67 (87%); Martina Salmon 10/12 (83%); Georgia Heffernan 9/11 (82%)		Elmere van der Berg 35/42 (83%); Kamogelo Maseko 7/11 (64%); Rolene Streutker 7/12 (58%); Nicholé Breedt 2/3 (67%)	Eventfinda Stadium

=== Second Test ===
Wednesday, 24 September 2025; 19:40 NZST	Stats	New Zealand	70–58	South Africa	Pettigrew Green Arena
Wednesday, 24 September 2025; 19:40 NZST	Stats	Scoring by quarter: 14–15, 34–28, 53–42, 70–58			Pettigrew Green Arena
Wednesday, 24 September 2025; 19:40 NZST	Stats	Grace Nweke 60/68 (88%); Martina Salmon 9/11 (82%); Filda Vui 1/1 (100%); Georgia Heffernan 0/2 (0%)		Elmere van der Berg 44/47 (94%); Kamogelo Maseko 14/19 (74%)	Pettigrew Green Arena

=== Third Test ===
Sunday, 28 September 2025; 19:40 NZDT	Stats	New Zealand	57–56	South Africa	ILT Stadium Southland
Sunday, 28 September 2025; 19:40 NZDT	Stats	Scoring by quarter: 8–12, 23–29, 41–43, 57–56			ILT Stadium Southland
Sunday, 28 September 2025; 19:40 NZDT	Stats	Grace Nweke 49/54 (91%); Martina Salmon 8/10 (80%)		Elmere van der Berg 46/51 (90%); Owethu Ngubane 10/14 (71%)	ILT Stadium Southland
