= 2019 Netball Quad Series =

International netball series

Tournament details
- Host country: England
- Cities: Liverpool; London
- Venue(s): M&S Bank Arena; Copper Box Arena
- Dates: 13–20 January 2019
- Teams: 4
- TV partner(s): Nine/9Gem (Australia); Sky Sports (UK/Ireland)

Final positions
- Champions: Australia (6th title)
- Runners-up: England
- Third place: New Zealand

Tournament statistics
- Matches played: 6
- Top scorer(s): Lenize Potgieter; 114/124 (92%)

The 2019 Netball Quad Series was the seventh Netball Quad Series series. It was hosted by England Netball. It featured Australia, England, New Zealand and South Africa playing each other in a series of six netball test matches in January 2019. The first two matches were played at Liverpool's M&S Bank Arena while the remaining four were played at London's Copper Box Arena.

With a team coached by Lisa Alexander and captained by Gabi Simpson and Caitlin Thwaites, Australia won the series over England on goal difference, having defeated both South Africa and New Zealand. Despite wins over New Zealand and Australia, a loss to South Africa ultimately cost England their first Netball Quad Series title. The series was broadcast live on Nine/9Gem in Australia and on Sky Sports in the United Kingdom and Ireland.

== Squads ==
Participating teams and rosters
Australia	England	New Zealand	South Africa
Kiera Austin; April Brandley; Kelsey Browne; Courtney Bruce; Emily Mannix; Jamie-Lee Price; Kate Moloney; Gabi Simpson (c); Caitlin Thwaites (c); Gretel Tippett; Liz Watson; Jo Weston; Steph Wood	Jade Clarke (vc); Rachel Dunn; Layla Guscoth; Serena Guthrie (c); Natalie Haythornthwaite; Jo Harten; Helen Housby; Geva Mentor; Chelsea Pitman; Razia Quashie; Eboni Usoro-Brown; Fran Williams	Karin Burger; Gina Crampton; Ameliaranne Ekenasio; Maria Folau; Casey Kopua; Laura Langman (c); Erena Mikaere; Kimiora Poi; Samantha Sinclair; Whitney Souness; Jane Watson; Maia Wilson	Erin Burger; Sigrid Burger; Khanyisa Chawane; Rome Dreyer; Maryka Holtzhausen; Phumza Maweni; Tshina Mdau; Bongiwe Msomi (c); Lenize Potgieter; Karla Pretorius (vc); Monique Reyneke; Renske Stoltz; Shadine van der Merwe; Ine-Marí Venter; Zanele Vimbela
Coach: Lisa Alexander	Coach: Tracey Neville	Coach: Noeline Taurua	Coach: Norma Plummer

Notes

- ^1 Regular captain, Caitlin Bassett, was unable to play due to injury. Gabi Simpson initially took over on-court captain duties. However, she also became injured and Caitlin Thwaites became on-court captain.

== Debuts ==
- On 13 January 2019, Kimiora Poi and Erena Mikaere made their senior debuts for New Zealand against England.

== Matches ==
=== Round 1 ===
13 January 2019	Australia	62–45	South Africa	M&S Bank Arena
3:30 pm	Gretel Tippett 30/32 (94%); Caitlin Thwaites 17/18 (94%); Steph Wood 15/18 (83%)	Stats	Lenize Potgieter 35/40 (88%); Ine-Marí Venter 7/9 (78%); Maryka Holtzhausen 3/4 (75%)

13 January 2019	England	54–41	New Zealand	M&S Bank Arena
6:00 pm	Jo Harten 27/32 (84%); Helen Housby 25/31 (81%); Natalie Haythornthwaite 2/3 (67%)	Stats	Maria Folau 29/32 (91%); Ameliaranne Ekenasio 12/13 (92%)

=== Round 2 ===
19 January 2019	Australia	53–50	New Zealand	Copper Box Arena
4:30 pm	Caitlin Thwaites 31/32 (97%); Gretel Tippett 12/12 (100%); Steph Wood 10/17 (59%)		Maria Folau 30/37 (81%); Ameliaranne Ekenasio 20/22 (91%)

19 January 2019	England	45–48	South Africa	Copper Box Arena
7:00 pm	Helen Housby 27/32 (84%); Jo Harten 18/22 (82%)	Stats	Lenize Potgieter 34/37 (92%); Maryka Holtzhausen 14/16 (88%)

=== Round 3 ===
20 January 2019	New Zealand	62–60	South Africa	Copper Box Arena
3:30 pm	Maria Folau 36/42 (86%); Ameliaranne Ekenasio 21/28 (75%); Maia Wilson 5/6 (83%)		Lenize Potgieter 45/47 (96%); Maryka Holtzhausen 15/22 (68%)

20 January 2019	England	52–49	Australia	Copper Box Arena
6:00 pm	Rachel Dunn 24/25 (96%); Jo Harten 23/26 (88%); Helen Housby 5/6 (83%)	Stats	Gretel Tippett 25/26 (96%); Caitlin Thwaites 16/16 (100%); Steph Wood 9/11 (82%)

== Final table ==
Pos	Team	P	W	L	GF	GA	GD	%	Pts
1	Australia	3	2	1	164	147	+17	111.56%	4
2	England	3	2	1	151	138	+13	109.42%	4
3	New Zealand	3	1	2	153	167	-14	91.62%	2
4	South Africa	3	1	2	153	169	-16	90.53%	2
