= 2025 Australia South Africa netball series =

International netball series

Tournament details
- Host country: Australia
- Dates: 4–12 October 2025
- TV partner(s): Kayo Freebies; Binge; SuperSport (South Africa); NetballPass

Final positions
- Champions: Australia
- Runners-up: South Africa

Tournament statistics
- Matches played: 3
- Top scorer(s): Sophie Garbin; 86/92 (93%)

The 2025 Australia South Africa netball series featured Australia and South Africa playing three netball test matches in October 2025. The Australia team were coached by Stacey Marinkovich and captained by Liz Watson. South Africa were coached by Jenny van Dyk and captained by Khanyisa Chawane. Australia won the series after winning the first two tests. They then completed a clean sweep after winning the third test. Alice Teague-Neeld was named Player of the Series. The series was broadcast live on Foxtel channels and services Kayo Freebies and Binge, by SuperSport in South Africa and by NetballPass worldwide.

== Squads ==
=== Australia ===
Australia roster
Players
Coaches

Name	Pos	DOB	Height	Club	Nat	Caps
Kiera Austin	GS, GA, WA	26 August 1997 (aged 28)	1.85 m (6 ft 1 in)	Melbourne Vixens
Lucy Austin	GS, GA	20 December 2001 (aged 23)	1.90 m (6 ft 3 in)	Giants Netball
Courtney Bruce	GK, GD	8 December 1993 (aged 31)	1.89 m (6 ft 2 in)	Sunshine Coast Lightning
Ashleigh Ervin	GK, GD	15 May 2003 (aged 22)	1.92 m (6 ft 4 in)	Sunshine Coast Lightning
Sophie Garbin	GS, GA	6 April 1997 (aged 28)	1.84 m (6 ft 0 in)	Melbourne Vixens
Matilda Garrett	GK, GD	11 August 1998 (aged 27)	1.85 m (6 ft 1 in)	Adelaide Thunderbirds
Georgie Horjus	GA, WA	28 January 2002 (aged 23)	1.72 m (5 ft 8 in)	Adelaide Thunderbirds
Sarah Klau	GK, GD	30 September 1994 (aged 31)	1.90 m (6 ft 3 in)	New South Wales Swifts
Cara Koenen	GS, GA	27 February 1996 (aged 29)	1.90 m (6 ft 3 in)	Sunshine Coast Lightning
Kate Moloney (vc)	WD, C, WA	8 January 1993 (aged 32)	1.77 m (5 ft 10 in)	Melbourne Vixens
Hannah Mundy	C, WA, WD	10 June 2001 (aged 24)	1.81 m (5 ft 11 in)	Melbourne Vixens
Jamie-Lee Price	WD, C	10 January 1996 (aged 29)	1.79 m (5 ft 10 in)	Melbourne Mavericks
Alice Teague-Neeld	WA, GA	2 March 1996 (aged 29)	1.83 m (6 ft 0 in)	West Coast Fever
Liz Watson (c)	WA, C	30 March 1994 (aged 30)	1.78 m (5 ft 10 in)	Sunshine Coast Lightning
Joanna Weston	GD, WD, GK	14 February 1994 (aged 31)	1.88 m (6 ft 2 in)	Melbourne Vixens

Head coach

- Stacey Marinkovich

Notes

- (c) – Captain
- (cc) – Co-captain
- (vc) – Vice-captain
- – Injury / maternity leave
- (TRP) – Temporary Replacement Player

Debuts

- Alice Teague-Neeld made her senior debut for Australia in the first test. She was subsequently named Player of the Series.
- Hannah Mundy, Lucy Austin and Ashleigh Ervin all their senior debuts for Australia in the third test. Mundy and her mother, Shelley O'Donnell, now became the first mother-daughter pair to both represent Australia.

=== South Africa ===
South Africa roster
Players
Coaches

Name	Pos	DOB	Height	Club	Nat	Caps
Nicholé Breedt	GA,WA	3 May 1997 (aged 28)	1.77 m (5 ft 10 in)	London Pulse	(England)
Khanyisa Chawane (c)	WD,C,WA	14 January 1996 (aged 29)	1.67 m (5 ft 6 in)	Cardiff Dragons	(Wales)
Entle Futshane	GK,GD,WD		1.77 m (5 ft 10 in)	Southern Stings	(South Africa)
Kamogelo Maseko	GA, WA	30 March 2002 (aged 23)	1.79 m (5 ft 10 in)	London Pulse	(England)
Tarle Mathe	WD,C,WA	9 August 2004 (aged 21)	1.71 m (5 ft 7 in)	Gauteng Golden Fireballs	(South Africa)
Owethu Ngubane	GS, GA	19 April 2002 (aged 23)	1.81 m (5 ft 11 in)	Gauteng Golden Fireballs	(South Africa)
Refiloe Nketsa	WD,C,WA	15 May 1995 (aged 30)	1.75 m (5 ft 9 in)	Free State Crinums	(South Africa)
Nozipho Ntshangase	GK,GD	31 October 1998 (aged 26)	1.79 m (5 ft 10 in)	Kingdom Stars	(South Africa)
Nicola Smith	GK,GD	25 April 2000 (aged 25)	1.88 m (6 ft 2 in)	Manchester Thunder	(England)
Rolene Streutker	GS	20 October 2000 (aged 24)	1.86 m (6 ft 1 in)	Nottingham Forest Netball	(England)
Elmeré van der Berg	GS, GA	9 April 2001 (aged 24)	1.91 m (6 ft 3 in)	Adelaide Thunderbirds	(Australia)
Shadine van der Merwe (vc)	GD,WD	25 November 1992 (aged 32)	1.81 m (5 ft 11 in)	Loughborough Lightning	(England)
Juanita van Tonder	GK		1.84 m (6 ft 0 in)	Eastern Cape Aloes	(South Africa)
Jamie van Wyk	GD	31 October 2000 (aged 24)	1.83 m (6 ft 0 in)	London Mavericks	(England)
Sanmarie Visser	GK,GD,WD	23 September 2003 (aged 22)	1.84 m (6 ft 0 in)	Leeds Rhinos	(England)

Head coach

- Jenny van Dyk

Assistant coach

- Zanele Mdodana

Manager: Vinolia Austin
Physiotherapist:
Motheo Selebedi
Doctor: Lindi Mokwena

Notes

- (c) – Captain
- (cc) – Co-captain
- (vc) – Vice-captain
- – Injury / maternity leave
- (TRP) – Temporary Replacement Player

Debuts

- Juanita van Tonder made her senior debut for South Africa in the third test.

== Match officials ==
=== Umpires ===
Umpire	Association
Angela Armstrong-Lush	New Zealand
Gareth Fowler	New Zealand
Kate Mann	England

=== Umpire Appointments Panel ===
Umpire	Association
Sharon Kelly	Australia

== Matches ==
=== First test ===
Saturday, 4 October 2025; 19:30 AEST	Australia	64–53	South Africa	Bendigo Stadium
Saturday, 4 October 2025; 19:30 AEST	Scoring by quarter: 14–14, 34–26, 50–41, 64–53			Bendigo Stadium
Saturday, 4 October 2025; 19:30 AEST	Sophie Garbin 34/38 (89%); Kiera Austin 16/19 (84%); Cara Koenen 10/13 (77%); Georgie Horjus 4/4 (100%)		Elmere van der Berg 37/42 (88%); Kamogelo Maseko 11/15 (73%); Owethu Ngubane 5/7 (71%)	Bendigo Stadium

=== Second test ===
Wednesday, 8 October 2025; 19:30 AEDT	Australia	67–40	South Africa	WIN Entertainment Centre; Attendance: 4,581
Wednesday, 8 October 2025; 19:30 AEDT	Scoring by quarter: 18–11, 32–22, 50–30, 67–40			WIN Entertainment Centre; Attendance: 4,581
Wednesday, 8 October 2025; 19:30 AEDT	Sophie Garbin 23/23 (100%); Cara Koenen 19/24 (79%); Kiera Austin 13/17 (76%); Georgie Horjus 12/12 (100%)		Elmere van der Berg 23/28 (82%); Rolene Streutker 9/11 (82%); Nicholé Breedt 4/8 (50%); Owethu Ngubane 4/5 (80%)	WIN Entertainment Centre; Attendance: 4,581

=== Third test ===
Sunday, 12 October 2025; 16:00 ACST	Australia	65–42	South Africa	Adelaide Entertainment Centre; Attendance: 8,535
Sunday, 12 October 2025; 16:00 ACST	Scoring by quarter: 20–11, 39–20, 49–32, 65–42			Adelaide Entertainment Centre; Attendance: 8,535
Sunday, 12 October 2025; 16:00 ACST	Sophie Garbin 29/31 (94%); Lucy Austin 18/22 (82%); Georgie Horjus 12/13 (92%); Cara Koenen 6/8 (75%)		Elmere van der Berg 20/21 (95%); Rolene Streutker 15/22 (68%); Kamogelo Maseko 4/4 (100%); Owethu Ngubane 3/6 (50%)	Adelaide Entertainment Centre; Attendance: 8,535
