= Varsity Netball =

University netball league in South Africa

- Sport: Netball
- Founded: 2013; 13 years ago
- No. of teams: 8
- Country: South Africa
- Most recent champion: NWU Pukke (3rd title)
- Most titles: UFS Kovsies (5 titles)
- Broadcaster: SuperSport
- Sponsors: First National Bank; Suzuki
- Website: Varsity Netball

Varsity Netball is a netball league featuring teams representing universities in South Africa. It was formed in 2013. UFS Kovsies were the inaugural winners and they remain the league's most successful team. It is one of several similar sports competitions that form the Varsity Sports series. Others include leagues for men's football, women's football, field hockey, men's rugby union, and women's rugby union.

== History ==
=== UFS Kovsies ===
In 2013, UFS Kovsies won the inaugural tournament. With a team captained by Maryka Holtzhausen, they defeated NWU-Pukke 44–40 in the final. They won further titles in 2014, 2018, and 2021. In 2024, UFS Kovsies won their fifth title, after defeating UJ Netball 58–55 in the final.

UFS Kovsies are closely associated with Free State Crinums of the Telkom Netball League. In 2018, 2019 and 2020, Crinums were a de facto Kovsie team. The vast majority of their squad members, including Lefébre Rademan and Khanyisa Chawane, were University of the Free State students. Crinums head coach, Burta de Kock, was also the head coach of Kovsies.

=== NWU-Pukke ===
In 2015 and 2016, with teams featuring Sigrid Burger, Renske Stoltz and Jeanté Strydom, NWU-Pukke won two successive titles. In 2015, after finishing the regular season in fourth place, they eliminated two-time defending champions, UFS Kovsies, in semi-final before going onto defeat Maties 50–37 in the final. In 2016 they retained the title following a narrow 56–55 win over UP-Tuks.

=== UP-Tuks ===
In 2017, after finishing as runners-up in 2014 and 2016, UP-Tuks and won their first title. Their winning team was coached by Jenny van Dyk, captained by Shadine van der Merwe and featured Marlize de Bruin and Ine-Marí Venter. In the final, they defeated NWU-Pukke 43–41. In 2019, UP-Tuks won their second title, this time defeating Maties 48–43 in the final. In 2023, UP-Tuks won their third title after defeating UJ Netball 63–61 in the final.

UP-Tuks are closely associated with Gauteng Jaguars. Since 2017, Jaguars have been winning Premier Netball League titles. The core of their team is made up of UP-Tuks players. Jenny van Dyk, served as head coach of both UP-Tuks and Jaguars.

== Teams ==
Team	University	Home venue	TNL partner
UFS Kovsies Netball	University of the Free State	Callie Human Hall	Free State Crinums
UJ Netball	University of Johannesburg		Gauteng Golden Fireballs
Madibaz Netball	Nelson Mandela University	Madibaz Sports Centre	Eastern Cape Aloes
NWU Netball Pukke	North-West University	NWU Mafikeng Great Hall	North West Flames
UP-Tuks Netball	University of Pretoria	Rembrandt Hall	Gauteng Jaguars
Maties Netball	Stellenbosch University	Coetzenburg Indoor Arena	
TUT Netball	Tshwane University of Technology		
Wits Netball	University of the Witwatersrand	Wits Sports Hall	

== Finals ==
Season	Winners	Score	Runners up	Venue
2013	UFS Kovsies	44–40	NWU-Pukke	Potchefstroom
2014	UFS Kovsies	49–42	UP-Tuks	Rembrandt Hall
2015	NWU-Pukke	50–37	Maties	Coetzenburg Indoor Arena
2016	NWU-Pukke	56–55	UP-Tuks	Rembrandt Hall
2017	UP-Tuks	43–41	NWU-Pukke	Rembrandt Hall
2018	UFS Kovsies	63–59	UP-Tuks	Bloemfontein
2019	UP-Tuks	48–43	Maties	Rembrandt Hall
2020	^{(Note 1)}			
2021	UFS Kovsies	55–39	Maties	Coetzenburg Indoor Arena
2022	Maties	68–55	NWU-Pukke	Coetzenburg Indoor Arena
2023	UP-Tuks	63–61	UJ Netball	Rembrandt Hall
2024	UFS Kovsies	58–55	UJ Netball	Callie Human Hall
2025	NWU-Pukke	57–49	UFS Kovsies	Callie Human Hall

Notes

- ^1 Cancelled due to the COVID-19 pandemic in South Africa.

== Notable players ==
=== Winning captains ===
Season	Team	Captains
2013	UFS Kovsies	Maryka Holtzhausen
2014	UFS Kovsies	Karla Mostert
2015		
2016	NWU-Pukke	Chante Bester
2017	UP-Tuks	Shadine van der Merwe
2018	UFS Kovsies	Alicia Puren
2019	UP-Tuks	Tshina Mdau
2021	UFS Kovsies	Sikholiwe Mdletshe
2022	Maties	Sian Moore
2023	UP-Tuks	Kamogelo Maseka
2024	UFS Kovsies	Refiloe Nketsa
2025	NWU Pukke	Martine Jordaan

=== Player of the Tournament ===
Season	Team	Winners
2013	UFS Kovsies	Ané Botha
2014	UFS Kovsies	Karla Mostert
2015	UFS Kovsies	Karla Mostert
2016	UP-Tuks	Shadine van der Merwe
2017	UFS Kovsies	Khomotso Mamburu
2018	UFS Kovsies	Khanyisa Chawane
2019	UFS Kovsies	Lefébre Rademan
2021	Maties	Nicholé Taljaard
2022	NWU-Pukke	Elmeré van den Berg
2023	NWU-Pukke	Sanmarie Visser
2024	UFS Kovsies	Rolene Streutker
2025	UFS Kovsies	Reratilwe Letsoalo

=== Internationals ===
South Africa

- Sigrid Burger
- Khanyisa Chawane
- Vanes-Mari du Toit
- Maryka Holtzhausen
- Shadine van der Merwe
- Lenize Potgieter
- Karla Pretorius
- Lefébre Rademan
- Renske Stoltz
- Jeanté Strydom
- Nicholé Taljaard
- Ine-Marí Venter
- Rolene Streutker
