= 2018 Netball Quad Series (September) =

International netball series

Tournament details
- Host countries: Australia; New Zealand
- Dates: 15–23 September 2018
- Teams: 4
- TV partner(s): Nine/9Gem (Australia); Sky Sports (UK/Ireland); Sky Sport (New Zealand); SuperSport (South Africa)

Final positions
- Champions: Australia (5th title)
- Runners-up: England
- Third place: New Zealand

Tournament statistics
- Matches played: 6
- Top scorer(s): Caitlin Bassett; 114/124 (92%)

The second 2018 Netball Quad Series was the sixth Netball Quad Series series. It was co-hosted by Netball Australia and Netball New Zealand. It featured Australia, England, New Zealand and South Africa playing each other in a series of six netball test matches in September 2018. It was the second of two Netball Quad Series' played in 2018. The first series was played in January.

With a team coached by Lisa Alexander and captained by Caitlin Bassett, Australia won the series after winning all three of their matches. The series was broadcast live on Nine/9Gem in Australia, on Sky Sports in the United Kingdom and Ireland, on Sky Sport in New Zealand and on SuperSport (South Africa).

== Squads ==
Participating teams and rosters
Australia	England	New Zealand	South Africa
Caitlin Bassett (c); April Brandley; Kelsey Browne; Courtney Bruce; Emily Mannix; Kim Ravaillion; Gabi Simpson; Caitlin Thwaites; Gretel Tippett; Liz Watson; Jo Weston; Steph Wood	Ama Agbeze (c); Eleanor Cardwell; Jade Clarke; Kadeen Corbin; Sasha Corbin; Jodie Gibson; Layla Guscoth; Serena Guthrie; Jo Harten; Natalie Haythornthwaite; Helen Housby; Geva Mentor; Chelsea Pitman	Karin Burger; Gina Crampton; Aliyah Dunn; Ameliaranne Ekenasio; Temalisi Fakahokotau; Maria Folau; Katrina Grant (vc); Laura Langman (c); Te Paea Selby-Rickit; Samantha Sinclair; Michaela Sokolich-Beatson; Peta Toeava; Jane Watson	Khanyisa Chawane; Rome Dreyer; Maryka Holtzhausen; Jessica Khomo; Danelle Lochner; Phumza Maweni; Bongiwe Msomi (c); Lenize Potgieter; Karla Pretorius (vc); Shadine van der Merwe; Ine-Marí Venter; Zanele Vimbela
Coach: Lisa Alexander	Coach: Tracey Neville	Coach: Noeline Taurua	Coach: Norma Plummer

== Debuts ==
- On 15 September 2018, Peta Toeava and Karin Burger made their senior debuts for New Zealand against England. For Burger, it was a debut that was memorable for the wrong reasons, as she was sent off the court.
- On 18 September 2018, Aliyah Dunn made her senior debut for New Zealand against South Africa.

== Matches ==
=== Round 1 ===
15 September 2018	Australia	61–44	South Africa	Spark Arena
2.00pm	Caitlin Bassett 31/34 (91%); Steph Wood 15/18 (83%); Gretel Tippett 8/8 (100%); Caitlin Thwaites 7/9 (78%)		Lenize Potgieter 19/23 (83%); Maryka Holtzhausen 15/20 (75%); Ine-Marí Venter 10/10 (100%)

15 September 2018	New Zealand	39–52	England	Spark Arena
4.00pm	Maria Folau 22/30 (73%); Ameliaranne Ekenasio 10/18 (56%); Te Paea Selby-Rickit 7/9 (78%)		Helen Housby 28/31 (90%); Jo Harten 23/31 (74%); Kadeen Corbin 1/3 (33%)

=== Round 2 ===
18 September 2018	New Zealand	61–37	South Africa	ASB Baypark Stadium
7.30pm	Maria Folau 35/37 (95%); Te Paea Selby-Rickit 17/22 (77%); Aliyah Dunn 9/12 (75%)		Lenize Potgieter 28/31 (90%); Ine-Marí Venter 5/7 (71%); Danelle Lochner 2/4 (50%); Maryka Holtzhausen 2/7 (29%)

19 September 2018	Australia	52–47	England	Newcastle Entertainment Centre
7.30pm	Caitlin Bassett 37/40 (93%); Steph Wood 10/12 (83%); Gretel Tippett 5/5 (100%)	Stats	Helen Housby 29/35 (83%); Kadeen Corbin 12/16 (75%); Natalie Haythornthwaite 6/9 (67%)

=== Round 3 ===
23 September 2018	England	45–42	South Africa	Melbourne Arena
11.00am	Helen Housby 31/35 (89%); Natalie Haythornthwaite 8/11 (73%); Eleanor Cardwell 6/7 (86%)	Stats	Lenize Potgieter 27/30 (90%); Ine-Marí Venter 7/10 (70%); Maryka Holtzhausen 7/11 (64%); Danelle Lochner 1/2 (50%)

23 September 2018	Australia	60–55	New Zealand	Melbourne Arena
1.00pm	Caitlin Bassett 46/50 (92%); Gretel Tippett 14/14 (100%)		Maria Folau 30/34 (88%); Te Paea Selby-Rickit 15/20 (75%); Aliyah Dunn 10/10 (100%)	Attendance: 8,011

== Final table ==
Pos	Team	P	W	L	GF	GA	GD	%	Pts
1	Australia	3	3	0	173	146	+27	118.49%	6
2	England	3	2	1	144	133	+11	108.27%	4
3	New Zealand	3	1	2	155	149	+6	104.03%	2
4	South Africa	3	0	3	123	167	-44	73.65%	0
