= 2018 Netball Quad Series =

2018 Netball Quad Series may refer to:

- 2018 Netball Quad Series (January), netball tournament played in the first half of the year
- 2018 Netball Quad Series (September), netball tournament played in the second half of the year
