= UP-Tuks Netball =

South African netball team

- Based in: University of Pretoria
- Regions: Gauteng
- Home venue: Rembrandt Hall
- Head coach: Amanda Mynhardt
- Captain: Alice Kennon
- League: Varsity Netball
- Website: www.up.ac.za
Uniform
Uniform

UP-Tuks Netball are a South African netball team based at the University of Pretoria. Their senior team represents the university in Varsity Netball. They also enter teams in University Sports South Africa, Netball South Africa and local Gauteng and Tshwane competitions. In addition they organise a university internal league.

== History ==
=== South Africa ===
UP-Tuks has a history of providing players for the South Africa national netball team. At the 2011 World Netball Championships, the South Africa squad featured five UP-Tuks players – Erin Burger, Chrisna Bootha, Amanda Mynhardt, Vanes-Mari du Toit and Leigh Ann Zackey. Mynhardt was also captain and the team was coached by Elize Kotze, a former UP-Tuks head coach. Burger was subsequently named player of the tournament.

=== Varsity Netball ===
In 2017, after finishing as runners-up in 2014 and 2016, UP-Tuks won their first Varsity Netball title. Their winning team was coached by Jenny van Dyk, captained by Shadine van der Merwe and featured Marlize de Bruin and Ine-Marí Venter. In the final, they defeated NWU-Pukke 43–41. In 2019, UP-Tuks won their second title, this time defeating Maties 48–43 in the final. In 2023, UP-Tuks won their third title after defeating UJ Netball 63–61 in the final.

=== Other competitions ===
USSA

UP-Tuks enter a team in the University Sports South Africa netball tournament. UP-Tuks won the 2024 USSA netball tournament after defeating the host's, UJ Netball, 41–40 in an entertaining final.

JNA Twizza League

In 2021, UP-Tuks under-20 team won the Gauteng Twizza Netball Club Championships.

=== Gauteng Jaguars ===
UP-Tuks are closely associated with Gauteng Jaguars. Since 2017, Jaguars have been winning Premier Netball League titles. The core of their team is made up of UP-Tuks players. Jenny van Dyk, served as head coach of both UP-Tuks and Jaguars.

== Finals ==
=== Varsity Netball ===
Season	Winners	Score	Runners up	Venue
2014	UFS Kovsies	49–42	UP-Tuks	Rembrandt Hall
2016	NWU-Pukke	56–55	UP-Tuks	Rembrandt Hall
2017	UP-Tuks	43–41	NWU-Pukke	Rembrandt Hall
2018	UFS Kovsies	63–59	UP-Tuks	Bloemfontein
2019	UP-Tuks	48–43	Maties	Rembrandt Hall
2023	UP-Tuks	63–61	UJ Netball	Rembrandt Hall

== Notable players ==
=== Captains ===
Years	Captains
20xx–2014	Melissa Myburgh
2015–2017	Shadine van der Merwe
2018–2019	Tshina Mdau
2021	Chantelle Swart
2022	Mbalenhle Ntuli
2023	Kamogelo Maseko
2024	Alice Kennon

=== Internationals ===
South Africa

- Chrisna Bootha
- Erin Burger
- Vanes-Mari du Toit
- Izette Griesel
- Amanda Mynhardt
- Lenize Potgieter
- Jeanté Strydom
- Shadine van der Merwe
- Ine-Marí Venter

South Africa Fast5

- Marlize de Bruin

== Coaches ==
=== Head coaches ===
Coach	Years
Elize Kotze	2004–2011
Jenny van Dyk	2011–2024
Erin Burger	2024
Amanda Mynhardt	2025–

=== Assistant coaches ===
Coach	Years
Jenny van Dyk	2008–2011
Erin Burger	2017–2018, 2023
Marlize de Bruin	2021
Shadine van der Merwe	2024
Tshina Mdau	2024

== Honours ==
- Varsity Netball
  - Winners: 2017, 2019, 2023
  - Runners Up: 2014, 2016, 2018
