= Limpopo Baobabs =

South African netball team

- Founded: 2014
- Based in: Polokwane
- Regions: Limpopo
- Head coach: Emily Mathosa
- League: Telkom Netball League
Uniform
Uniform

Limpopo Baobabs are a South African netball team based in Polokwane. Since 2014 they have represented Limpopo in the Telkom Netball League. In 2023 they won the Division Two Shield and, after winning a play-off, they were promoted to Division One.

== History ==
=== Brutal Fruit Netball Cup ===
In 2014, Limpopo Baobabs, together with Southern Stings, Kingdom Stars, Mpumalanga Sunbirds and Northern Cape Diamonds, became founder members of Division Two of the Brutal Fruit Netball Cup. Between 2014 and 2016, Baobabs were coached by Cecilia Molekwane. Molekwane subsequently became the president of Netball South Africa.

=== Telkom Netball League ===
In 2023, Limpopo Baobabs finished the season as the Division Two Shield winners. Baobabs were exceptional in the round-robin stages, winning 13 out of 15 games to qualify for the semi-final. In the final they defeated Western Cape Tornados 65–40. After defeating Kingdom Stars 55–37 in a promotion/relegation play-off, Baobabs replaced Stars in Division One. At the 2023 Limpopo Women in Sports Awards, Limpopo Baobab were named the Team of the Year and their head coach, Emily Mathosa, was named Coach of the Year. In 2024, Baobabs lost all their Division A matches during the round-robin stages but in a promotion/relegation play-off, they defeated Kingdom Stars 65–40 and, as a result, they secured their spot in the top division.

== Finals/Playoffs ==
=== Division Two Shield ===
Season	Winners	Score	Runners up	Venue
2023	Limpopo Baobabs	65–40	Western Cape Tornados	Heartfelt Arena

=== Promotion/Relegation ===
Season	Winners	Score	Runners up	Venue
2023	Limpopo Baobabs	55–37	Kingdom Stars	Heartfelt Arena
2024	Limpopo Baobabs	65–40	Kingdom Stars	

== Notable players ==
=== Captains ===
Years	Captains
2020–2023	Nthabiseng Mothutsi

== Coaches ==
=== Head coaches ===
Coach	Years
2014–2016	Cecilia Molekwane
2017	Dumisani Chauke
2018	Jenne-lee Delport
2020	Paulinah Thobakgale
2020–2021	Anna Ledwaba
2022–	Emily Mathosa

=== Assistant coaches ===
Coach	Years
2021	Vasta Nchefu
2022	Monique Lombard
2023	Tshimangadzo Munyai

== Honours ==
- Division Two Shield
  - 2023
- Telkom Netball League Promotion/Relegation Play-off
  - 2023, 2024
