= Gauteng Jaguars =

South African netball team

- Founded: 2014
- Based in: University of Pretoria
- Regions: Gauteng
- Head coach: Rozanne Matthyse
- Captain: Jamie Van Wyk
- Premierships: 6 (2017, 2018, 2019, 2020, 2021, 2023)
- League: Telkom Netball League
Uniform
Uniform

Gauteng Jaguars are a South African netball team based at the University of Pretoria. Since 2014, together with Gauteng Golden Fireballs, they have represented Gauteng in the Telkom Netball League. They are the league's most successful team and, as of 2024, have featured in every final. Between 2017 and 2021, Jaguars won five successive titles. In 2023, they won a sixth title. In 2017 and 2018, they also represented Netball South Africa in the Netball New Zealand Super Club.

== History ==
=== Brutal Fruit Netball Cup ===
In 2014, Gauteng Jaguars, together with Free State Crinums, Eastern Cape Aloes, Gauteng Golden Fireballs and North West Flames, became founder members of Division One of the Brutal Fruit Netball Cup. Between 2014 and 2016, they played in three successive finals. However, on each occasion they lost to Free State Crinums.

=== Netball New Zealand Super Club ===
In 2017 and 2018, Jaguars represented Netball South Africa in the Netball New Zealand Super Club. On the opening day of the 2018 tournament they caused an upset when, with a team featuring Marlize de Bruin, Shadine van der Merwe and Ine-Mare Venter, they defeated Southern Steel, the 2018 ANZ Premiership premiers.

=== Telkom Netball League ===
Between 2017 and 2021, Jaguars won five successive Telkom Netball League titles. In 2017, they won their first title after defeating North West Flames 49–43 in the final. They retained the title in 2018, 2019, 2020 and 2021. In 2023, they won their sixth title.

=== UP-Tuks ===
Jaguars are closely associated with the University of Pretoria and their Varsity Netball team, UP-Tuks. The core of their team is made up of UP-Tuks players. Jenny van Dyk, served as head coach of both UP-Tuks and Jaguars.

== Finals ==
=== Division One ===
| Season | Winners | Score | Runners up | Venue |
|---|---|---|---|---|
| 2014 | Free State Crinums | 40–36 | Gauteng Jaguars | University of Pretoria |
| 2015 | Free State Crinums | 61–59 | Gauteng Jaguars | University of Pretoria |
| 2016 | Free State Crinums | 52–43 | Gauteng Jaguars | Olive Centre, Durban |
| 2017 | Gauteng Jaguars | 49–43 | North West Flames | Mangaung Indoor Centre, Bloemfontein |
| 2018 | Gauteng Jaguars | 51–43 | Southern Stings | University of Pretoria |
| 2019 | Gauteng Jaguars | 53–38 | Southern Stings | University of Pretoria |
| 2020 | Gauteng Jaguars | 38–26 | Free State Crinums | Mangaung Indoor Sports Center, Bloemfontein |
| 2021 | Gauteng Jaguars | 53–41 | Southern Stings | Rustenburg |
| 2022 | Gauteng Golden Fireballs | 35–32 | Gauteng Jaguars | Heartfelt Arena |
| 2023 | Gauteng Jaguars | 59–51 | Free State Crinums | Heartfelt Arena |
| 2024 | Free State Crinums | 47–46 | Gauteng Jaguars | Ellis Park Arena |

== Notable players ==
=== Captains ===
| Years | Captains |
|---|---|
| 2017–2018 | Shadine van der Merwe |
| 2019 | Marlize de Bruin |
| 2020 | Izette Griesel |
| 2021 | Marlize de Bruin |
| 2022 | Izette Griesel |
| 2023 | Jasmine Ziegelmeier |
| 2024 | Jamie Van Wyk |

=== Internationals ===
South Africa

- Erin Burger
- Izette Griesel
- Kamogelo Maseko
- Nonsikelelo Mazibuko
- Shadine van der Merwe
- Tshina Mdau
- Lungile Mthembu
- Lenize Potgieter
- Simoné le Roux
- Renske Stoltz
- Jeanté Strydom
- Chantelle Swart
- Jamie Golob
- Ine-Marí Venter
- Kyla Dames

South Africa Fast5

- Marlize de Bruin

== Coaches ==
=== Head coaches ===
| Coach | Years |
|---|---|
| Jenny van Dyk | 2014–2021 |
| Rozanne Matthyse | 2021– |

=== Assistant coaches ===
| Coach | Years |
|---|---|
| Judy Rathethe | 20xx– |
| Erin Burger | 2022 |

== Honours ==
- Telkom Netball League
  - Winners: 2017, 2018, 2019, 2020, 2021, 2023
  - Runners Up: 2014, 2015, 2016, 2022, 2024
