= 2018 Suncorp Super Netball season =

- League: Suncorp Super Netball
- Sport: Netball
- Duration: 28 April – 26 August 2018
- Teams: 8
- TV partner: Nine Network
- Streaming partner: Telstra TV

Regular season
- Minor premiers: GIANTS Netball
- Season MVP: Jhaniele Fowler
- Top scorer: Jhaniele Fowler (783 goals)

Finals
- Champions: Sunshine Coast Lightning
- Runners-up: West Coast Fever
- Grand Final MVP: Caitlin Bassett

Seasons
- ← 2017 2019 →

The 2018 Suncorp Super Netball season was the second season of the premier netball league in Australia. The season began on 28 April and concluded with the Grand Final on 26 August 2018. The start of the season was delayed to late April due to the 2018 Commonwealth Games, which was held earlier that month on the Gold Coast. The fixtures for the season were released on 11 October 2017.

Sunshine Coast Lightning were the defending premiers and successfully defended their title, defeating West Coast Fever in the Grand Final at Perth Arena.

== Overview ==
=== Teams ===
Team	Captain	Coach	Home Courts	Ref.
Adelaide Thunderbirds	Leana De Bruin	Dan Ryan	Priceline Stadium; Adelaide Entertainment Centre	
Collingwood Magpies	Madison Robinson	Kristy Keppich-Birrell	Hisense Arena; Margaret Court Arena; Silverdome	
GIANTS Netball	Kimberlee Green	Julie Fitzgerald	State Sports Centre; Qudos Bank Arena; AIS Arena; International Convention Centre	
Melbourne Vixens	Kate Moloney	Simone McKinnis	Hisense Arena; Margaret Court Arena	
New South Wales Swifts	Abbey McCulloch	Briony Akle	State Sports Centre; Qudos Bank Arena	
Queensland Firebirds	Gabi Simpson	Roselee Jencke	Brisbane Entertainment Centre; Coomera Sport and Leisure Centre	
Sunshine Coast Lightning	Geva Mentor	Noeline Taurua	University of Sunshine Coast Stadium	
West Coast Fever	Courtney Bruce	Stacey Marinkovich	Perth Arena; HBF Stadium	

=== Format ===
The season is played over fourteen rounds, allowing every team to play each other twice, once at home and once away. The top four teams on the ladder at the conclusion of the regular season qualify for the finals series. In the first week of the finals series, the 1st ranked team hosts the 2nd ranked team in the major semi-final (with the winner of that match to qualify for the Grand Final) and the 3rd ranked team hosts the 4th ranked team in the minor semi-final (with the loser of that match eliminated). The loser of the major semi-final then hosts the winner of the minor semi-final in the preliminary final. The winner of the major semi-final then hosts the winner of the preliminary final in the Grand Final.

=== Rule changes ===
Netball Australia announced a change to the points system for the regular season, with bonus points being introduced. Under the new system, teams earn 4 points for a win and 1 point for every quarter won in a match. A drawn match earns a team 2 points and drawing a quarter earns no points. The winning team can earn a maximum of 8 points per match.

Additionally, teams can request up to two time-outs per half and at any point in time while play is in progress, any one member of the team bench (players and team officials) listed on the official score sheet shall be permitted to move up and down their team bench within the bench zone to communicate with their on-court or off-court players. Finally, umpires can now award a penalty pass for delaying play or intimidation and quarter time and half time breaks will be increased by one and three minutes respectively.

=== Broadcast ===
The Nine Network televised two matches each round during the regular season and also televised all finals matches. Telstra televised the other two matches each round. Every match of the season was available to be streamed live via the Netball Australia App. Unlike 2017, Nine telecast their two matches on the main channel, rather than secondary channel 9Gem. The two matches broadcast on Nine were on Saturday and Sunday afternoon.

== Regular season ==
=== Round 1 ===
Sat 28 Apr	Melbourne Vixens	59–58	Collingwood Magpies	Hisense Arena
3.00pm	Kumwenda 41/42 (98%); Philip 18/20 (90%)	Stats	Thwaites 36/38 (95%); Bell 22/29 (76%)

Sun 29 Apr	Adelaide Thunderbirds	56–74	West Coast Fever	Priceline Stadium
12.30pm	Nelson 37/42 (88%); Latu-Meafou 10/13 (77%); Hodges 9/10 (90%)	Stats	Fowler 66/68 (97%); Medhurst 5/6 (83%); Stanton 3/3 (100%)

Sun 29 Apr	Giants Netball	54–51	Sunshine Coast Lightning	Qudos Bank Arena
1.00pm	Harten 33/36 (92%); Pettitt 21/28 (75%)	Stats	Bassett 36/41 (88%); Wood 15/16 (94%)

Sun 29 Apr	New South Wales Swifts	54–53	Queensland Firebirds	Qudos Bank Arena
3.00pm	Housby 24/31 (77%); Garbin 18/19 (95%); Wallace 12/17 (71%)	Stats	Aiken 45/51 (88%); Tippett 8/11 (73%)

=== Round 2 ===
Sat 5 May	Adelaide Thunderbirds	48–71	Giants Netball	Priceline Stadium
2.30pm	Nelson 34/38 (89%); Hodges 11/14 (79%); Leta-Meafou 3/3 (100%)	Stats	Brice 29/29 (100%); Harten 25/32 (78%); Pettitt 17/20 (85%)

Sat 5 May	West Coast Fever	68–57	Collingwood Magpies	Perth Arena
7.00pm	Fowler 62/67 (93%); Medhurst 6/7 (86%)	Stats	Thwaites 39/45 (87%); Bell 17/27 (63%); Brown 1/2 (50%)

Sun 6 May	Queensland Firebirds	55–52	Sunshine Coast Lightning	Brisbane Entertainment Centre
1.00pm	Aiken 39/45 (87%); Tippett 16/21 (76%)	Stats	Bassett 35/36 (97%); Wood 17/18 (94%)

Sun 6 May	Melbourne Vixens	63–61	New South Wales Swifts	Margaret Court Arena
3.00pm	Kumwenda 34/34 (100%); Philip 29/32 (91%)	Stats	Wallace 37/38 (97%); Housby 24/25 (96%)

=== Round 3 ===
Sat 12 May	Melbourne Vixens	55–59	Queensland Firebirds	Hisense Arena
3.00pm	Kumwenda 29/32 (91%); Philip 26/29 (90%)	Stats	Aiken 40/47 (85%); Tippett 19/22 (86%)

Sat 12 May	Sunshine Coast Lightning	55–56	West Coast Fever	University of Sunshine Coast Stadium
5.00pm	Bassett 33/39 (85%); Wood 22/25 (88%)	Stats	Fowler 39/44 (89%); Medhurst 17/21 (81%)

Sat 12 May	Collingwood Magpies	70–50	Adelaide Thunderbirds	Hisense Arena
7.00pm	Thwaites 55/57 (96%); Bell 15/21 (71%)	Stats	Nelson 37/42 (88%); Hodges 9/14 (64%); Latu-Meafou 4/6 (67%)

Sun 13 May	New South Wales Swifts	55–54	Giants Netball	Qudos Bank Arena
1.00pm	Housby 23/27 (85%); Garbin 17/18 (94%); Wallace 15/18 (83%)	Stats	Harten 38/41 (93%); Pettitt 16/19 (84%)

=== Round 4 ===
Sat 19 May	Giants Netball	53–51	Queensland Firebirds	State Sports Centre
3.00pm	Brice 27/31 (87%); Harten 18/20 (90%); Pettitt 8/9 (89%)	Stats	Aiken 32/38 (84%); Tippett 19/19 (100%)

Sun 20 May	Adelaide Thunderbirds	50–72	Melbourne Vixens	Priceline Stadium
12.30pm	Nelson 37/41 (90%); Hodges 13/15 (87%)	Stats	Kumwenda 47/47 (100%); Philip 25/27 (93%)

Sun 20 May	Collingwood Magpies	50–52	Sunshine Coast Lightning	Margaret Court Arena
1.00pm	Thwaites 36/41 (88%); Bell 14/20 (70%)	Stats	Bassett 37/37 (100%); Wood 15/22 (68%)

Sun 20 May	West Coast Fever	63–54	New South Wales Swifts	HBF Stadium
1.00pm	Fowler 53/59 (90%); Medhurst 8/8 (100%); Stanton 2/5 (40%)	Stats	Wallace 24/28 (86%); Housby 24/31 (77%); Garbin 6/7 (86%)

=== Round 5 ===
Sat 26 May	Queensland Firebirds	71–61	West Coast Fever	Brisbane Entertainment Centre
3.00pm	Aiken 45/51 (88%); Tippett 26/28 (93%)	Stats	Fowler 48/49 (98%); Medhurst 11/14 (79%); Stanton 2/2 (100%)

Sun 27 May	New South Wales Swifts	64–54	Collingwood Magpies	State Sports Centre
1.00pm	Wallace 43/48 (90%); Housby 21/23 (91%)	Stats	Thwaites 39/44 (89%); Bell 14/21 (67%); Teague-Neeld 1/2 (50%)

Sun 27 May	Sunshine Coast Lightning	60–51	Adelaide Thunderbirds	University of Sunshine Coast Stadium
3.00pm	Bassett 43/47 (91%); Wood 17/20 (85%)	Stats	Nelson 30/34 (88%); Hodges 12/14 (86%); Latu-Meafou 9/12 (75%)

Sun 27 May	Giants Netball	58–51	Melbourne Vixens	State Sports Centre
5.00pm	Harten 24/28 (86%); Brice 17/20 (85%); Pettitt 17/22 (77%)	Stats	Kumwenda 38/38 (100%); Philip 13/19 (68%)

=== Round 6 ===
Sat 2 Jun	Sunshine Coast Lightning	64–56	Melbourne Vixens	University of Sunshine Coast Stadium
3.00pm	Bassett 51/53 (96%); Wood 13/17 (76%)	Stats	Kumwenda 31/33 (94%); Philip 22/28 (79%); Gooden 3/4 (75%)

Sat 2 Jun	West Coast Fever	63–61	Giants Netball	Perth Arena
7.00pm	Fowler 53/56 (95%); Medhurst 10/11 (91%)	Stats	Pettitt 26/29 (90%); Brice 20/23 (87%); Harten 15/16 (94%)

Sun 3 Jun	New South Wales Swifts	51–49	Adelaide Thunderbirds	State Sports Centre
1.00pm	Wallace 30/34 (88%); Housby 15/20 (75%); Garbin 6/9 (67%)	Stats	Nelson 33/39 (85%); Latu-Meafou 12/14 (86%); Glasgow 4/8 (50%)

Sun 3 Jun	Collingwood Magpies	67–62	Queensland Firebirds	Silverdome
3.00pm	Thwiates 34/40 (85%); Bell 33/39 (85%)	Stats	Aiken 42/51 (82%); Tippett 20/21 (95%)

=== Round 7 ===
Sat 16 Jun	Melbourne Vixens	74–60	West Coast Fever	Hisense Arena
3.00pm	Kumwenda 49/51 (96%); Philip 31/35 (89%)	Stats	Fowler 56/60 (93%); Stanton 3/5 (60%); Medhurst 1/2 (50%)

Sun 17 Jun	Adelaide Thunderbirds	42–66	Queensland Firebirds	Priceline Stadium
12.30pm	Nelson 23/25 (92%); Hodges 14/19 (74%); Latu-Meafou 5/5 (100%)	Stats	Aiken 46/61 (75%); Tippett 20/21 (95%)

Sun 17 Jun	Giants Netball	63–60	Collingwood Magpies	Qudos Bank Arena
1.00pm	Pettitt 29/31 (94%); Harten 25/28 (89%); Brice 9/11 (82%)	Stats	Thwaites 38/40 (95%); Bell 22/26 (85%)

Sun 17 Jun	New South Wales Swifts	59–56	Sunshine Coast Lightning	Qudos Bank Arena
3.00pm	Wallace 43/45 (96%); Housby 16/19 (84%)	Stats	Bassett 34/36 (94%); Wood 22/25 (88%)

=== Round 8 ===
Sat 23 Jun	Sunshine Coast Lightning	53–53	Giants Netball	University of Sunshine Coast Stadium
3.00pm	Bassett 40/44 (91%); Wood 13/16 (81%)	Stats	Harten 30/33 (91%); Pettitt 21/25 (84%); Brice 2/5 (40%)

Sat 23 Jun	West Coast Fever	76–56	Adelaide Thunderbirds	Perth Arena
7.00pm	Fowler 66/73 (90%); Medhurst 10/11 (91%)	Stats	Nelson 47/51 (92%); Hodges 7/11 (64%); Latu-Meafou 2/3 (67%)

Sun 24 Jun	Collingwood Magpies	57–65	Melbourne Vixens	Margaret Court Arena
1.00pm	Thwaites 49/51 (96%); Bell 8/16 (50%)	Stats	Kumwenda 42/43 (98%); Phillip 23/24 (96%)

Sun 24 Jun	Queensland Firebirds	60–57	New South Wales Swifts	Brisbane Entertainment Centre
3.00pm	Aiken 43/49 (88%); Tippett 17/18 (94%)	Stats	Housby 25/32 (78%); Garbin 19/23 (83%); Wallace 13/15 (87%)

=== Round 9 ===
Sat 30 Jun	New South Wales Swifts	58–65	Melbourne Vixens	State Sports Centre
3.00pm	Wallace 48/50 (96%); Housby 10/11 (91%)	Stats	Kumwenda 37/39 (95%); Philip 28/30 (93%)

Sat 30 Jun	Collingwood Magpies	57–70	West Coast Fever	Margaret Court Arena
7.00pm	Thwaites 43/50 (86%); Teague-Neeld 11/13 (85%); Bell 3/6 (50%)	Stats	Fowler 62/66 (94%); Medhurst 8/8 (100%)

Sun 1 Jul	Sunshine Coast Lightning	58–57	Queensland Firebirds	University of Sunshine Coast Stadium
1.00pm	Bassett 34/38 (89%); Wood 24/27 (89%)	Stats	Aiken 33/39 (85%); Tippett 24/25 (96%)

Sun 1 Jul	Giants Netball	63–44	Adelaide Thunderbirds	AIS Arena
3.00pm	Harten 30/34 (88%); Pettitt 27/35 (77%); Brice 6/6 (100%)	Stats	Nelson 23/27 (85%); Glasgow 11/16 (69%); Hodges 10/14 (71%)

=== Round 10 ===
Sat 7 Jul	Queensland Firebirds	57–58	Melbourne Vixens	Gold Coast Sports and Leisure Centre
3.00pm	Aiken 38/47 (81%); Tippett 19/20 (95%)	Stats	Kumwenda 29/32 (91%); Philip 29/35 (83%)

Sat 7 Jul	West Coast Fever	59–58	Sunshine Coast Lightning	HBF Stadium
7.00pm	Fowler 50/56 (89%); Medhurst 9/12 (75%)	Stats	Bassett 43/47 (91%); Wood 15/19 (79%)

Sun 8 Jul	Adelaide Thunderbirds	48–58	Collingwood Magpies	Adelaide Entertainment Centre
12.30pm	Nelson 32/34 (94%); Hodges 11/11 (100%); Tuivaiti 5/5 (100%)	Stats	Thwaites 50/54 (93%); Bell 8/13 (62%); Teague-Neeld 0/2 (0%)

Sun 8 Jul	Giants Netball	66–56	New South Wales Swifts	International Convention Centre
5.00pm	Harten 29/37 (78%); Pettitt 19/21 (90%); Brice 18/21 (86%)	Stats	Wallace 40/45 (89%); Housby 16/18 (89%)

=== Round 11 ===
Sat 14 Jul	Sunshine Coast Lightning	58–56	Collingwood Magpies	University of Sunshine Coast Stadium
3.00pm	Bassett 43/43 (100%); Wood 15/18 (83%)	Stats	Thwaites 30/36 (83%); Bell 26/31 (84%)

Sat 14 Jul	New South Wales Swifts	68–74	West Coast Fever	State Sports Centre
7.00pm	Wallace 35/40 (88%); Housby 23/26 (88%); Garbin 10/12 (83%)	Stats	Fowler 61/65 (94%); Medhurst 13/15 (87%)

Sun 15 Jul	Queensland Firebirds	64–50	Giants Netball	Brisbane Entertainment Centre
1.00pm	Aiken 35/51 (69%); Tippett 29/31 (94%)	Stats	Harten 25/29 (86%); Pettitt 23/26 (88%); Brice 2/4 (50%)

Sun 15 Jul	Melbourne Vixens	73–48	Adelaide Thunderbirds	Hisense Arena
3.00pm	Kumwenda 52/56 (93%); Philip 17/20 (85%); Gooden 4/7 (57%)	Stats	Tuivaiti 28/29 (97%); Hodges 13/15 (87%); Nelson 7/9 (78%); Pitman 0/1 (0%)

=== Round 12 ===
Sat 21 Jul	Collingwood Magpies	57–57	New South Wales Swifts	Hisense Arena
3.00pm	Thwaites 34/37 (92%); Bell 23/29 (79%)	Stats	Garbin 21/22 (95%); Housby 19/22 (86%); Wallace 17/19 (89%)

Sat 21 Jul	West Coast Fever	54–60	Queensland Firebirds	Perth Arena
7.00pm	Fowler 42/45 (93%); Medhurst 12/16 (75%)	Stats	Aiken 41/50 (82%); Tippett 19/24 (79%)

Sun 22 Jul	Melbourne Vixens	58–60	Giants Netball	Hisense Arena
1.00pm	Kumwenda 41/43 (95%); Philip 17/22 (77%); Gooden 0/1 (0%)	Stats	Pettitt 30/35 (86%); Harten 30/35 (86%)

Sun 22 Jul	Adelaide Thunderbirds	44–75	Sunshine Coast Lightning	Priceline Stadium
12.30pm	Nelson 24/30 (80%); Hodges 13/17 (76%); Tuivaiti 7/7 (100%)	Stats	Bassett 41/45 (91%); Wood 20/25 (80%); Koenen 14/17 (82%)

=== Round 13 ===
Sat 28 Jul	Sunshine Coast Lightning	61–51	New South Wales Swifts	University of Sunshine Coast Stadium
3.00pm	Bassett 42/46 (91%); Wood 19/22 (86%)	Stats	Housby 23/29 (79%); Wallace 16/17 (94%); Garbin 12/15 (80%)

Sun 29 Jul	Queensland Firebirds	67–46	Adelaide Thunderbirds	Brisbane Entertainment Centre
1.00pm	Aiken 45/54 (83%); Tippett 22/27 (81%)	Stats	Nelson 33/35 (94%); Latu-Meafou 7/8 (88%); Pitman 3/5 (60%); Tuivaiti 3/3 (100%)

Sun 29 Jul	Collingwood Magpies	56–66	Giants Netball	Hisense Arena
3.00pm	Thwaites 37/41 (90%); Bell 19/23 (83%)	Stats	Harten 36/41 (88%); Pettitt 30/32 (94%)

Sun 29 Jul	West Coast Fever	68–55	Melbourne Vixens	Perth Arena
3.00pm	Fowler 62/66 (94%); Medhurst 6/7 (86%)	Stats	Kumwenda 32/36 (89%); Philip 20/25 (80%); Gooden 3/6 (50%)

=== Round 14 ===
Fri 3 Aug	Adelaide Thunderbirds	41–69	New South Wales Swifts	Priceline Stadium
7.00pm	Nelson 20/26 (77%); Latu-Meafou 17/23 (74%); Tuivaiti 4/4 (100%); Pitman 0/2 (0%)	Stats	Wallace 40/42 (95%); Housby 17/19 (89%); Garbin 10/12 (83%)

Sat 4 Aug	Queensland Firebirds	76–44	Collingwood Magpies	Brisbane Entertainment Centre
3.00pm	Aiken 51/63 (81%); Tippett 25/27 (93%)	Stats	Thwaites 30/32 (94%); Bell 7/11 (64%); Teague-Neeld 7/10 (70%)

Sat 4 Aug	Giants Netball	69–66	West Coast Fever	International Convention Centre
7.00pm	Pettitt 35/40 (88%); Harten 34/40 (85%)	Stats	Fowler 63/72 (88%); Medhurst 2/4 (50%); Stanton 1/1 (100%)

Sun 5 Aug	Melbourne Vixens	51–56	Sunshine Coast Lightning	Hisense Arena
1.00pm	Commane 31/33 (94%); Philip 20/24 (83%)	Stats	Bassett 41/48 (85%); Wood 15/19 (79%)

== Ladder ==
2018 Suncorp Super Netball ladder
Pos	Team	P	W	D	L	GF	GA	%	BP	PTS
1	Giants Netball	14	10	1	3	841	776	108.4	34	76
2	West Coast Fever	14	10	0	4	912	851	107.2	31	71
3	Queensland Firebirds	14	9	0	5	858	751	114.2	33	69
4	Sunshine Coast Lightning	14	8	1	5	809	752	107.6	35	69
5	Melbourne Vixens	14	8	0	6	855	814	105.0	27	59
6	New South Wales Swifts	14	6	1	7	814	816	99.8	22	48
7	Collingwood Magpies	14	3	1	10	801	858	93.4	25	39
8	Adelaide Thunderbirds	14	0	0	14	673	945	71.2	4	4
Last updated: 10 August 2018 — Source

== Finals Series ==
=== Major Semi Final ===
Sat 11 Aug; 3.00pm	Report; Stats	Giants Netball	57–63	West Coast Fever	State Sports Centre	Nine
Sat 11 Aug; 3.00pm	Report; Stats	Scoring by quarter: 10–18, 17–12, 17–15, 13–18			State Sports Centre	Nine
Sat 11 Aug; 3.00pm	Report; Stats	Harten 33/38 (87%); Pettitt 24/30 (80%)		Fowler 48/48 (100%); Medhurst 9/9 (100%); Stanton 6/7 (86%)	State Sports Centre	Nine

=== Minor Semi Final ===
Sun 12 Aug; 1.00pm	Report; Stats	Queensland Firebirds	56–57	Sunshine Coast Lightning	Brisbane Entertainment Centre	Nine
Sun 12 Aug; 1.00pm	Report; Stats	Scoring by quarter: 15–16, 12–15, 15–17, 14–9			Brisbane Entertainment Centre	Nine
Sun 12 Aug; 1.00pm	Report; Stats	Aiken 37/42 (88%); Tippett 19/19 (100%)		Bassett 37/39 (95%); Wood 20/26 (77%)	Brisbane Entertainment Centre	Nine

=== Preliminary Final ===
Sun 19 Aug; 1.00pm	Report; Stats	Giants Netball	50–59	Sunshine Coast Lightning	Qudos Bank Arena	Nine
Sun 19 Aug; 1.00pm	Report; Stats	Scoring by quarter: 15–15, 11–12, 11–16, 13–16			Qudos Bank Arena	Nine
Sun 19 Aug; 1.00pm	Report; Stats	Harten 28/32 (88%); Austin 12/16 (75%); Pettitt 9/15 (60%); Brice 1/1 (100%)		Bassett 40/43 (93%); Wood 19/23 (83%)	Qudos Bank Arena	Nine

=== Grand Final ===
Sun 26 Aug; 1.00pm AEST	Report; Stats	West Coast Fever	59–62	Sunshine Coast Lightning	Perth Arena; Attendance: 13,722	Nine
Sun 26 Aug; 1.00pm AEST	Report; Stats	Scoring by quarter: 14–14, 15–12, 16–22, 14–14			Perth Arena; Attendance: 13,722	Nine
Sun 26 Aug; 1.00pm AEST	Report; Stats	Fowler 53/55 (96%); Medhurst 6/10 (60%)		Bassett 45/50 (90%); Wood 17/20 (85%)	Perth Arena; Attendance: 13,722	Nine
Sun 26 Aug; 1.00pm AEST	Report; Stats	Grand Final MVP: Caitlin Bassett			Perth Arena; Attendance: 13,722	Nine

== Awards ==
The following players, coaches and umpires were awarded by Netball Australia for performances in the 2018 season:

- The Player of the Year Award was won by Jhaniele Fowler of the West Coast Fever.
- The Grand Final MVP Award was won by Caitlin Bassett of the Sunshine Coast Lightning.
- The Young Star Award was won by Jess Anstiss of the West Coast Fever.
- The Joyce Brown Coach of the Year award was won by Stacey Marinkovich of the West Coast Fever.
- The Leading Goalscorer Award was won by Jhaniele Fowler of the West Coast Fever, who scored 783 goals in the regular season.
- The following players were named in the Super Netball Team of the Year:

Attackers

- Goal Shooter: Jhaniele Fowler
  (West Coast Fever)
- Goal Attack: Gretel Tippett
  (Queensland Firebirds)

Midcourters

- Wing Attack: Liz Watson
  (Melbourne Vixens)
- Centre: Serena Guthrie
  (GIANTS Netball)
- Wing Defence: Jess Anstiss
  (West Coast Fever)

Defenders

- Goal Defence: Karla Pretorius
  (Sunshine Coast Lightning)
- Goal Keeper: Geva Mentor
  (Sunshine Coast Lightning)

Reserves

- Attack Reserve: Jo Harten
  (GIANTS Netball)
- Midcourt Reserve: Kimberlee Green
  (GIANTS Netball)
- Defence Reserve: Laura Geitz
  (Queensland Firebirds)
