= UJ Netball =

South African netball team

- Full name: University of Johannesburg Netball Club
- Based in: Kingsway Campus Auckland Park; University of Johannesburg
- Regions: Gauteng
- Home venue: UJ Netball Courts; Westdene
- Head coach: Bongiwe Msomi
- Captain: Cornelia Mupenda
- League: Varsity Netball
- Website: www.uj.ac.za
Uniform
Uniform

University of Johannesburg Netball Club, commonly known as UJ Netball, are a South African netball team based at Kingsway Campus Auckland Park at the University of Johannesburg. Their senior team represents the university in Varsity Netball. They also enter teams in University Sports South Africa, Netball South Africa and local Gauteng competitions. In addition they organise a University of Johannesburg netball league.

== History ==
=== Varsity Netball ===
In August 2019, Bongiwe Msomi, South Africa's captain, was appointed UJ Netball's head coach. In 2022, UJ Netball played in the semi-final stages of Varsity Netball for the first time. In 2023, Msomi guided UJ Netball to their first Varsity Netball final. However, they finished as runners up after losing 63–61 to UP-Tuks in the final. In 2024, Msomi guided UJ Netball to the final for the second consecutive year. However, once again they finished as runners up, this time losing 58–55 to UFS Kovsies.

=== Other competitions ===
USSA

At the 2019 University Sports South Africa tournament, UJ Netball narrowly missed out on promotion to a more senior division. After winning the Premier A division, they lost a promotion-relegation play off 45–44 against the University of the Western Cape. At the 2022 USSA tournament, both the senior and reserve UJ Netball teams won their respective divisions and gained promotions. UJ Netball hosted the 2024 USSA tournament at the UJ Netball Courts in Westdene. For the first time, the tournament included a men's netball competition. The UJ Netball Men reached their final, finishing as runners-up after narrowly losing 44–41 to TUT. The senior women's team also finished second after losing 41–40 to UP-Tuks in an entertaining final.

JNA Twizza League

In 2021, UJ Netball won the Johannesburg Netball Association section of the Twizza Netball Club Championships. This league is organised by Netball South Africa and features district, provincial and national sections.

Gauteng

In 2022, UJ Netball were runners up at the Gauteng Province Netball Championships. In 2023 they won the Gauteng Netball Super League using their reserve team as the senior team was playing in Varsity Netball. They won this title just a few days ahead of the senior teams second consecutive appearance in a Varsity Netball semi-final.

== Finals ==
Varsity Netball

Season	Winners	Score	Runners up	Venue
2023	UP-Tuks	63–61	UJ Netball	Rembrandt Hall
2024	UFS Kovsies	58–55	UJ Netball	Callie Human Hall

== Notable players ==
=== Captains ===
Years	Captains
Deancke Rohde	2016
Rykie Venter	2019
Liza Kruger	2022
Cornelia Mupenda	2023, 2024

=== Internationals ===
South Africa

- Boitumelo Mahloko
- Tarle Mathe
- Nomfundo Mngomezulu
- Owethu Ngubane
- Monique Reyneke

Namibia

- Monica Gomases
- Liza Kruger
- Cornelia Mupenda

=== Telkom Netball League ===
UJ Netball players have represented several teams in the Telkom Netball League, most notably Gauteng Golden Fireballs. In 2022 when Fireballs won the TNL title, their squad featured seven UJ Netball players plus Bongiwe Msomi who was the UJ Netball head coach. In 2023 approximately sixteen UJ Netball players, representing seven teams, were included in TNL squads.

2022 Gauteng Golden Fireballs

- Jessica Du Plessis
- Monica Gomases
- Tarle Mathe
- Monique Reyneke
- Boitumelo Mahloko
- Nomfundo Mngomezulu
- Owethu Ngubane

== Coaches ==
=== Head coaches ===
Coach	Years
David Maree	20xx– 2019
Bongiwe Msomi	2019–

== Honours ==
- Varsity Netball
  - Runners Up: 2023, 2024
- Gauteng Netball Super League
  - Winners: 2023
