= 2018 Netball Quad Series (January) =

International netball series

Tournament details
- Host countries: England; South Africa
- Cities: London; Johannesburg
- Venue(s): Copper Box Arena; Ellis Park Arena
- Dates: 20–28 January 2018
- Teams: 4
- TV partner(s): Sky Sports (UK/Ireland); Sky Sport (New Zealand)

Final positions
- Champions: Australia (4th title)
- Runners-up: England
- Third place: New Zealand

Tournament statistics
- Matches played: 6
- Top scorer(s): Helen Housby; 106/122 (87%)

The first 2018 Netball Quad Series was the fifth Netball Quad Series series. It was co-hosted by England Netball and Netball South Africa. It featured Australia, England, New Zealand and South Africa playing each other in a series of six netball test matches in January 2018. The first three matches were played at London's Copper Box Arena and the final three were played at Johannesburg's Ellis Park Arena. It was the first of two Netball Quad Series' played in 2018. The second series was played in September. With a team coached by Lisa Alexander and captained by Caitlin Bassett, Australia won the series after winning all three of their matches. The series was broadcast live on Sky Sports in the United Kingdom and Ireland and on Sky Sport in New Zealand.

== Squads ==
Participating teams and rosters
Australia	England	New Zealand	South Africa
Caitlin Bassett (c); April Brandley; Courtney Bruce; Paige Hadley; Emily Mannix; Kate Moloney; Kim Ravaillion; Gabi Simpson; Caitlin Thwaites; Gretel Tippett; Liz Watson; Jo Weston; Steph Wood	Ama Agbeze (c); Eboni Beckford-Chambers; Eleanor Cardwell; Jade Clarke (vc); Beth Cobden; Kadeen Corbin; Sasha Corbin; Stacey Francis; Jodie Gibson; Serena Guthrie; Natalie Haythornthwaite; Helen Housby; Geva Mentor; Chelsea Pitman	Kayla Cullen; Temalisi Fakahokotau; Maria Folau (vc); Katrina Grant (c); Kelly Jury; Grace Kara; Phoenix Karaka; Bailey Mes; Shannon Saunders; Te Paea Selby-Rickit; Samantha Sinclair; Whitney Souness; Jane Watson; Maia Wilson	Erin Burger; Maryka Holtzhausen; Izette Griesel; Danelle Lochner; Phumza Maweni; Bongiwe Msomi (c); Precious Mthembu; Lenize Potgieter; Karla Pretorius (vc); Shadine van der Merwe; Ine-Marí Venter; Zanele Vimbela
Coach: Lisa Alexander	Coach: Tracey Neville	Coach: Janine Southby	Coach: Norma Plummer; Assistant coaches: Nicole Cusack; Elsje Jordaan

== Milestones ==
- On 25 January 2018, Erin Burger made her 100th senior appearance for South Africa in the match against New Zealand. She became the first South Africa netball international to make 100 test appearances.

== Matches ==
=== Round 1 ===
20 January 2018	Australia	54–50	South Africa	Copper Box Arena
15:30	Caitlin Thwaites 22/23 (96%); Caitlin Bassett 13/14 (93%); Susan Pettitt 11/11 (100%); Gretel Tippett 8/9 (89%)		Lenize Potgieter 34/38 (89%); Maryka Holtzhausen 16/18 (89%)

20 January 2018	England	64–57	New Zealand	Copper Box Arena
18:00	Helen Housby 36/42 (86%); Kadeen Corbin 28/33 (85%)		Maria Folau 35/38 (92%); Bailey Mes 22/26 (85%)

=== Round 2 ===
22 January 2018	England	46–50	Australia	Copper Box Arena
19:45	Helen Housby 33/36 (92%); Kadeen Corbin 12/16 (75%); Eleanor Cardwell 1/2 (50%)	Stats	Caitlin Bassett 30/31 (97%); Steph Wood 14/20 (70%); Caitlin Thwaites 5/5 (100%); Susan Pettitt 1/1 (100%)

25 January 2018	South Africa	46–51	New Zealand	Ellis Park Arena
19:00	Lenize Potgieter 31/36 (86%); Maryka Holtzhausen 15/20 (75%)		Maria Folau 23/33 (70%); Te Paea Selby-Rickit 20/25 (80%); Bailey Mes 8/11 (73%)

=== Round 3 ===
28 January 2018	Australia	67–48	New Zealand	Ellis Park Arena
12:00	Caitlin Bassett 28/31 (90%); Susan Pettitt 18/22 (82%); Steph Wood 15/20 (75%); Caitlin Thwaites 6/10 (60%)		Te Paea Selby-Rickit 28/30 (93%); Maria Folau 16/21 (76%); Bailey Mes 4/7 (57%)

28 January 2018	South Africa	47–52	England	Ellis Park Arena
14:30	Lenize Potgieter 33/35 (94%); Maryka Holtzhausen 14/21 (67%)	Stats	Helen Housby 37/44 (84%); Natalie Haythornthwaite 11/14 (79%); Kadeen Corbin 4/5 (80%)

== Final table ==
Pos	Team	P	W	L	GF	GA	GD	%	Pts
1	Australia	3	3	0	171	144	+33	118.75%	6
2	England	3	2	1	162	154	+8	105.19%	4
3	New Zealand	3	1	2	156	177	–21	88.14%	2
4	South Africa	3	0	3	143	157	–14	91.08%	0
