= 2021 Varsity Sports (South Africa) =

2021 Varsity Sport
Tournament information
- Sport: Netball; Association football
- Date: 2021
- Administrator: Varsity Sports

The 2021 Varsity Sport, the 10 season of a South African university.

This tournaments, football and netball, will take place in a secure COVID-19 bio-bubble called the Varsity Sport Village, matches will be played at University of Pretoria and Stellenbosch University.

== Netball ==
Semifinals
29 August
Maties	62
UP-Tuks	53
29 August
Kovsie	66
NWU	65

Final
30 August
Maties	39
Kovsie	55
Bronze Medal Match
29 August
UP-Tuks	62
NWU	48

== Football ==
=== Men ===
Pos	Team	Pld	W	D	L	GF	GA	GD	Pts
1	UJ	7	4	2	1	6	0	+6	14
2	Tuks	7	4	2	1	2	0	+2	14
3	Kovsie	7	3	3	1	3	0	+3	12
4	TUT	7	3	2	2	0	0	0	11
5	WITS	7	3	1	3	4	0	+4	10
6	NWU	7	2	2	3	3	0	+3	8
7	VUT	7	2	2	3	0	2	−2	8
8	UKZN	7	0	0	7	0	16	−16	0

Source: Football
Rules for classification: 3 points for a win, 1 point for a draw. The top 4 teams qualified for the Semi-Finals.

==== Semi-finals ====
28 October 2021	UJ	1-1 (5-4 p)	TUT	Tuks Stadium
16:00		Report

28 October 2021	Tuks	1-2	Kovsie	Tuks Stadium
18:00		Report

==== Finals ====
4 October 2021	UJ	4 - 1	Kovsie	Tuks Stadium
19:15		Report

=== Women ===
==== Group A ====
Pos	Team	Pld	W	D	L	GF	GA	GD	Pts
1	Tuks	3	2	1	0	6	0	+6	7
2	WITS	3	1	2	0	4	0	+4	5
3	TUT	3	1	1	1	5	0	+5	4
4	DUT	3	0	0	3	0	15	−15	0

Source: Women Foolball Pool

==== Group B ====
Pos	Team	Pld	W	D	L	GF	GA	GD	Pts
1	UWC	3	3	0	0	8	0	+8	9
2	UJ	3	2	0	1	6	0	+6	6
3	NWU	3	1	0	2	0	0	0	3
4	UL	3	0	0	3	0	12	−12	0

Source: Women Foolball Pool

==== Finals ====
4 October 2021	UWC	0-0 (4-3 p)	Tuks	Tuks Stadium
17:00		Report
