= Jeanté Strydom =

South Africa netball international

Personal information
- Born: 30 September 1996 (age 29) Pretoria, South Africa
- Height: 1.82 m (6 ft 0 in)
- University: North-West University; University of Pretoria

Netball career
- Playing positions: GD, GK, WD
Years	Club team	Apps
2016	NWU-Pukke	
2015–2016	North West Flames	
2017–2018	UP-Tuks	
2017–2018	Gauteng Jaguars	
2019	Bond Bull Sharks	
2020–2022	Kingdom Stars	
2023	Gauteng Golden Fireballs	
2024–	Southern Steel	
Years	National team	Caps
2021–2022	President's XII	
2023–	South Africa	
Medal record
Representing South Africa
World University Netball Championship
Silver medal – second place	2018 Kampala	Team
Fast5 Netball World Series
Silver medal – second place	2022 Christchurch	Team

Jeanté Strydom (born 30 September 1996) is a South Africa netball international. She represented South Africa at the 2023 Netball World Cup. In South Africa, she played for NWU-Pukke and UP Tuks in Varsity Netball and for several teams, most notably Gauteng Jaguars, in the Premier Netball League. Ahead of the 2024 ANZ Premiership season, Strydom signed for Southern Steel.

== Playing career ==
=== Varsity Netball ===
In 2016, Strydom, together with Sigrid Burger and Renske Stoltz, was a member of the NWU-Pukke team that won the Varsity Netball title. In 2018 she was a member of the UP-Tuks team that reached the final.

=== Premier Netball League ===
Between 2015 and 2023, Strydom played for several teams in the Premier Netball League. She began her PNL career with North West Flames before switching to Gauteng Jaguars. In 2017 and 2018 she also played for Jaguars in the Netball New Zealand Super Club tournaments. In 2018 she was a member of the Jaguars team that defeated Southern Steel. After a brief stint playing for Bond Bull Sharks in the Sapphire Series, in 2020 she returned to the PNL to play for Kingdom Stars. In 2022 she captained Stars. It was her first season as a PNL team captain. During the 2023 season she played for Gauteng Golden Fireballs.

=== Southern Steel ===
Ahead of the 2024 ANZ Premiership season, Strydom signed for Southern Steel. In her debut season she established herself as a regular member of the team, making 14 senior appearances.

=== South Africa ===
Strydom played for the Netball South Africa President's XII at both the 2021 SPAR Challenge Series and 2022 SPAR Diamond Challenge. In 2022, she captained the team. She was a prominent member of the South Africa team which finished as runners-up to Australia in the 2022 Fast5 Netball World Series. She was subsequently included in the senior South Africa squad for the 2023 Netball World Cup and on 28 July 2023, she made her senior debut for South Africa against Wales during the tournament.

Tournaments	Place	Team
2021 SPAR Challenge Series	1st	(South Africa) President's XII
2022 SPAR Diamond Challenge	3rd	(South Africa) President's XII
2022 Fast5 Netball World Series	2nd	South Africa
2023 Netball World Cup	6th	South Africa
2025 Netball Nations Cup	2nd	South Africa
