= Steph Wood =

Australia netball international

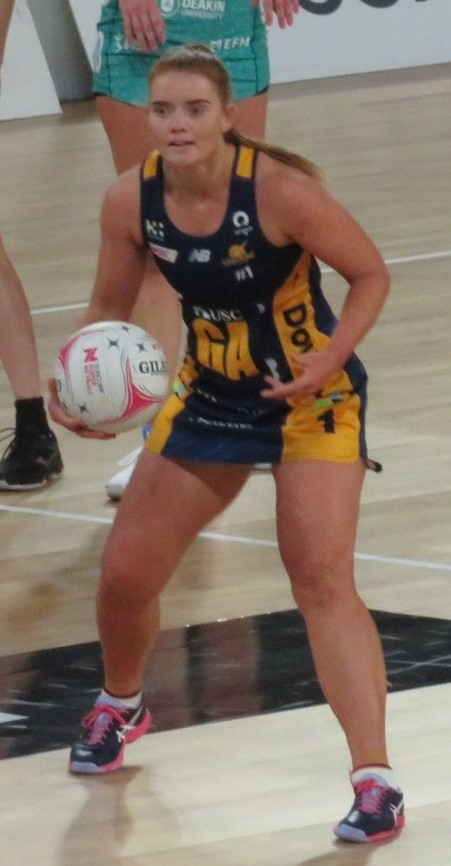

Personal information
- Full name: Stephanie Fretwell (Née: Wood)
- Born: 28 November 1991 (age 34) Hyde Park, Queensland, Australia
- Height: 1.75 m (5 ft 9 in)
- Spouse: Marcus Fretwell (m. 2023)

Netball career
- Playing positions: GA, WA
Years	Club team	Apps
2008–2013	Suncoast Lynx	
2009	→ Carina Tigers	
2009–2014	Queensland Fusion	
2010–2011	→ AIS	
2012	→ Queensland Firebirds	0
2014–2016	New South Wales Swifts	
2015	→ NNSW Waratahs	
2016–2025	Sunshine Coast Lightning	
Years	National team	Caps
2017–2023	Australia	56
Medal record
Representing Australia
Netball World Cup
Silver medal – second place	2019 Liverpool	Team
Gold medal – first place	2023 Cape Town	Team
Commonwealth Games
Silver medal – second place	2018 Gold Coast	Team
Gold medal – first place	2022 Birmingham	Team

Stephanie Fretwell (born 28 November 1991), previously known as Stephanie Wood, is a retired Australian Netball player. She played the majority of her career for the Sunshine Coast Lightning in the Super Netball competition, as well as 56 games for the Australia national netball team. she has announced she will be coming out of retirement and joining London Pulse for the 2026/27 superleague season

Wood was a member of the Australia teams that won gold medals at the 2022 Commonwealth Games and at the 2023 Netball World Cup. Between 2015 and 2016, Fretwell played for New South Wales Swifts in the ANZ Championship. Since 2017 she has played for Sunshine Coast Lightning in Suncorp Super Netball. Between 2015 and 2019, she featured in five successive grand finalist squads, winning premierships with Sunshine Coast Lightning in 2017 and 2018.

== Early life and family ==
Wood was born in Hyde Park, Queensland. Her family moved around because her father served in the Australian Defence Force. The family eventually settled in Brisbane and Brendale. She is the youngest of three girls. Her two older sisters, Jodie and Tracey, also played netball.

== Playing career ==
=== Early years ===
Wood started playing netball when she was six and was playing in division one with the Pine Rivers Netball Association when she was twelve. She represented Queensland at under-17, under-19 and under-21 levels. In 2010 she captained the under-19 team to an Australian National Netball Championships title and was named Tournament MVP. Her shooting partner was Ameliaranne Wells. Wood also played for both Suncoast Lynx and Carina Tigers in the Queensland State Netball League.

=== Queensland Fusion ===
Between 2009 and 2014, Wood played for Queensland Fusion in the Australian Netball League. In 2014 she was a member of the Fusion team that finished as runners up in the ANL. She was also named the 2014 Queensland Fusion MVP. While playing for Fusion, Wood was also called up as a replacement player for Queensland Firebirds during the 2012 ANZ Championship season. However she never made a senior appearance for Firebirds.

=== Australian Institute of Sport ===
Between 2010 and 2011, Wood played for the Australian Institute of Sport. In 2011 she won the Gweneth Benzie Award for the best player in the program.

=== New South Wales Swifts ===
In 2014 Wood signed for New South Wales Swifts. She subsequently made her ANZ Championship debut with Swifts in a 2015 Round 2 match against Waikato Bay of Plenty Magic. During 2015, Fretwell played for NNSW Waratahs in the Australian Netball League. Wood played for Swifts in two successive grand finals in 2015 and 2016. However, on both occasions they lost to Queensland Firebirds.

=== Sunshine Coast Lightning ===
Since 2017, Wood has played for Sunshine Coast Lightning in Suncorp Super Netball. Together with Caitlin Bassett, she was one of the first players to join the new franchise. Wood was a member of the Lighting teams that won the 2017 and 2018 Suncorp Super Netball titles. In 2018 she was named Lightning's Members' Player of the Year. She also shared the main MVP award with Karla Pretorius.

	Grand finals	Team	Place	Opponent	Goals
1	2015	New South Wales Swifts	Runners up	Queensland Firebirds	
2	2016	New South Wales Swifts	Runners up	Queensland Firebirds	3/4 (75%)
3	2017	Sunshine Coast Lightning	Winners	Giants Netball	16/20 (80%)
4	2018	Sunshine Coast Lightning	Winners	West Coast Fever	17/20 (85%)
5	2019	Sunshine Coast Lightning	Runners up	New South Wales Swifts	8/14 (57%)

=== Australia ===
Wood made her senior debut for Australia on 27 August 2016 against South Africa during the 2016 Netball Quad Series. She had previously represented Australia at under-19 and under-21 levels. Wood was subsequently a member of the Australia teams that won the silver medals at the 2018 Commonwealth Games and at the 2019 Netball World Cup.

Wood was appointed as vice-captain of the Diamonds in 2021, alongside captain Liz Watson, with the team winning every major tournament under their leadership, including gold medals at the 2022 Commonwealth Games and 2023 Netball World Cup.

Following the 2023 Netball World Cup, Wood announced her retirement from international netball after 56 matches for the Diamonds.

Tournaments	Place
2016 Netball Quad Series	1st place, gold medalist(s)
2018 Netball Quad Series (January)	1st place, gold medalist(s)
2018 Commonwealth Games	2nd place, silver medalist(s)
2018 Netball Quad Series (September)	1st place, gold medalist(s)
2019 Netball Quad Series	1st place, gold medalist(s)
2019 Netball World Cup	2nd place, silver medalist(s)
2022 Netball Quad Series	1st place, gold medalist(s)
2022 Commonwealth Games	1st place, gold medalist(s)
2023 Netball Quad Series	1st place, gold medalist(s)
2023 Netball World Cup	1st place, gold medalist(s)

== Honours ==
Australia

- Netball Quad Series
  - Winners: 2016, 2018 (I), 2018 (II), 2019, 2022, 2023
- Netball World Cup
  - Winners: 2023
  - Runners Up: 2019
- Commonwealth Games
  - Winners: 2022
  - Runners Up: 2018

Sunshine Coast Lightning

- Suncorp Super Netball
  - Winners: 2017, 2018
  - Runners Up: 2019

New South Wales Swifts

- ANZ Championship
  - Runners Up: 2015, 2016

Queensland Fusion

- Australian Netball League
  - Runners up: 2014: 1

Queensland

- Australian National Netball Championships
  - Winners: Under-19 (2010)
