= Matthew Watson (footballer, born 1992) =

Australian rules footballer (born 1992)

Personal information
- Full name: Matthew Watson
- Born: 16 July 1992 (age 34)
- Original teams: Pascoe Vale (EDFL); Calder Cannons (TAC Cup)
- Draft: No. 18, 2010 National Draft, Carlton
- Height: 195 cm (6 ft 5 in)
- Weight: 101 kg (223 lb)
- Position: Defender / Forward

Playing career^{1}
Years	Club	Games (Goals)
2011–2015	Carlton	23 (10)
- ^{1} Playing statistics correct to the end of 2015.

Matthew Watson (born 16 July 1992) is a former professional Australian rules footballer who played for the Carlton Football Club in the Australian Football League (AFL).

A key position player, Watson began his career primarily as a tall defender, then later transitioned into a forward. Originally from Victoria, Watson attended and played school football for Penleigh and Essendon Grammar School and Pascoe Vale. He played TAC Cup football for the Calder Cannons. He represented Vic Metro at the 2008 AFL Under 16 Championships and 2010 AFL Under 18 Championships, where he was selected as a defender in the Under 18 All-Australian team.

Watson was recruited by the Carlton Football Club with its first round selection in the 2010 AFL National Draft (number 18 overall). He was given the number 10 guernsey. He made his AFL debut in Round 2, 2011 against Gold Coast, in what was the first game played by the new Gold Coast franchise. Watson played a total of three matches for Carlton in his debut season, and played mostly for its VFL-affiliate, the Northern Bullants (later the Northern Blues).

He played sporadically for Carlton over his five years on the senior list, playing a total of 23 games. His highest return was eight senior matches in 2012. He never won a regular position in the senior team, and was delisted at the conclusion of the 2015 season. He played 69 games and kicked 44 goals for the Northern Blues/Bullants during that time.

He became known at Carlton for his long, accurate left-footed kicks out of defence, and as a result, Carlton fans would shout "woof!" whenever Watson kicked the ball: Watson was the fourth long-kicking left-footed Carlton player to receive this traditional treatment, after Val Perovic in the 1980s, Ang Christou in the 1990s and Chris Bryan in the 2000s.

Watson is the nephew of Steven Alessio, who played for Essendon. His sister, Liz Watson, an Australia netball international.
