= Free State Crinums =

South African netball team

- Founded: 2014
- Based in: Bloemfontein
- Regions: Free State
- Head coach: Martha Mosoahle-Samm
- Premierships: 4 (2014, 2015, 2016, 2024)
- League: Telkom Netball League
Uniform

Free State Crinums are a South African netball team based in Bloemfontein. Since 2014, they have represented the Free State in the Telkom Netball League. They were the inaugural league champions. Between 2014 and 2016, Crinums won three successive titles. In 2024, they won a fourth title.

== History ==
=== Brutal Fruit Netball Cup ===
In 2014, Free State Crinums, together with Eastern Cape Aloes, Gauteng Golden Fireballs, Gauteng Jaguars and North West Flames, became founder members of Division One of the Brutal Fruit Netball Cup. They were subsequently the inaugural league champions. Between 2014 and 2016, with teams coached by Burta de Kock, captained by Maryka Holtzhausen and featuring Karla Pretorius, Crinums won three successive titles. On each occasion they defeated Gauteng Jaguars in the final.

=== Telkom Netball League ===
Crinums are closely associated with the University of the Free State and their Varsity Netball team, UFS-Kovsies. In 2018, 2019 and 2020, Crinums were a de facto Kovsie team. The vast majority of squad members, including Lefébre Rademan and Khanyisa Chawane, were UFS students. Crinums head coach, Burta de Kock, was also the head coach of the Kovsies. In 2020 and 2023, Crinums were Telkom Netball League finalists again. However, on both occasions they lost to Gauteng Jaguars. In 2024, Crinums, with a team coached by Martha Mosoahle-Samm and featuring a returning Karla Pretorius, won a fourth title.

== Finals ==
=== Division One ===
Season	Winners	Score	Runners up	Venue
2014	Free State Crinums	40–36	Gauteng Jaguars	University of Pretoria
2015	Free State Crinums	61–59	Gauteng Jaguars	University of Pretoria
2016	Free State Crinums	52–43	Gauteng Jaguars	Olive Centre, Durban
2018	Gauteng Jaguars	51–43	Southern Stings	University of Pretoria
2020	Gauteng Jaguars	38–26	Free State Crinums	Mangaung Indoor Sports Center, Bloemfontein
2023	Gauteng Jaguars	59–51	Free State Crinums	Heartfelt Arena
2024	Free State Crinums	47–46	Gauteng Jaguars	Ellis Park Arena

== Notable players ==
=== Captains ===
Years	Captains
2014–2017	Maryka Holtzhausen
2018	Maryke Coetzee
2019–2020	Lefébre Rademan
2021	Sikholiwe Mdletshe
2022–2023	Ané Retief

=== Internationals ===
South Africa

- Khanyisa Chawane
- Maryka Holtzhausen
- Sikholiwe Mdletshe
- Refiloe Nketsa
- Karla Pretorius
- Lefébre Rademan
- Ané Retief
- Karla Victor
- Rolene Streutket

== Coaches ==
=== Head coaches ===
Coach	Years
Burta de Kock	2014–2021
Martha Mosoahle-Samm	2021–

=== Assistant coaches ===
Coach	Years
Martha Mosoahle-Samm	201x–2021
Karin Venter	2022–

== Honours ==
- Telkom Netball League
  - Winners: 2014, 2015, 2016, 2024
  - Runners Up: 2020, 2023
