= Gabi Simpson =

Australia netball player (born 1992)

Personal information
- Full name: Gabrielle Simpson
- Born: 17 October 1992 (age 34) Darlinghurst, New South Wales
- Height: 176 cm (5 ft 9 in)
- School: St Catherine's School
- University: University of Queensland

Netball career
- Playing position: WD
2010–2011	NNSW Blues	
2012	Australian Institute of Sport	
2012	→ New South Wales Swifts	
2013–2023	Queensland Firebirds	
Years	National team	Caps
2015–2021	Australia	41
Medal record
Representing Australia
Commonwealth Games
Silver medal – second place	2018 Gold Coast	Team
Fast5 Netball World Series
Silver medal – second place	2014 Auckland	Team
Silver medal – second place	2013 Auckland	Team

Gabrielle Simpson (born 17 October 1992), also known as Gabi Simpson, is an Australia former netball international player. Simpson was vice-captain of the Australia team that won the silver medal at the 2018 Commonwealth Games. Simpson was also a member of the Queensland Firebirds teams that won the 2015 and 2016 ANZ Championships. Since 2017, Simpson has captained Firebirds in Suncorp Super Netball. In 2017, she received the Liz Ellis Diamond award and is regarded as one of the best wing defence's of all time. She also previously sat on the board of the Australian Netball Players’ Association.

== Early life and education ==
Born 17 October 1992, Simpson is originally from Sydney's Eastern Suburbs, growing up in Randwick and, in 2010, graduating from St Catherine's School, Waverley. Between 2010 and 2022 she completed a Bachelor of Physiotherapy. She started her degree at the University of Sydney but switched to the University of Queensland after joining Queensland Firebirds.

== Playing career ==
=== New South Wales ===
Simpson played for teams representing Randwick, Baulkham Hills and Parramatta Auburn. Between 2009 and 2012, she represented New South Wales at under-17, under-19 and under-21 levels in the Australian National Netball Championships. In 2010, she was a member of the under-19 team that were runners up. In 2011, she was a member of both the under-19 and under-21 tournament winning teams. She was also named the under-19 tournament Most Valuable Player. In 2012, she won a third tournament with the under-21 team.

=== Australian Netball League ===
Between 2010 and 2012, Simpson played in the Australian Netball League. In 2010 and 2011 she played for NNSW Blues and in 2012 she played for the Australian Institute of Sport.

=== New South Wales Swifts ===
Simpson was included in the 2012 New South Wales Swifts squad as a temporary replacement player.

=== Queensland Firebirds ===
Since 2013, Simpson has played for Queensland Firebirds, initially in the ANZ Championship and later in Suncorp Super Netball. Between 2013 and 2016, she played in four successive grand finals for Firebirds, helping the team win two premierships in 2015 and 2016. Since 2017, Simpson has captained Firebirds in Suncorp Super Netball. In 2017, Simpson received the Liz Ellis Diamond award.

	Grand finals	Team	Place	Opponent
1	2013	Queensland Firebirds	Runners up	Adelaide Thunderbirds
2	2014	Queensland Firebirds	Runners up	Melbourne Vixens
3	2015	Queensland Firebirds	Winners	New South Wales Swifts
4	2016	Queensland Firebirds	Winners	New South Wales Swifts

=== Central Pulse ===
In 2025, Simpson was signed as a temporary replacement player for the Central Pulse in the ANZ Premiership.

=== Australia ===
Simpson made her senior debut for Australia on 20 October 2015 against New Zealand during the first test of the 2015 Constellation Cup series . Between 2009 and 2012, she had represented Australia at under-17, under-19 and under-21 levels. She also represented Australia at the 2013 and 2014 Fast5 Netball World Series. Simpson was vice-captain of the Australia team that won the silver medal at the 2018 Commonwealth Games.

Tournaments	Place
2013 Netball World Youth Cup	2nd place, silver medalist(s)
2013 Fast5 Netball World Series	2nd place, silver medalist(s)
2014 Fast5 Netball World Series	2nd place, silver medalist(s)
2016 Netball Quad Series	1st place, gold medalist(s)
2017 Netball Quad Series (January/February)	1st place, gold medalist(s)
2017 Netball Quad Series (August/September)	2nd place, silver medalist(s)
2018 Netball Quad Series (January)	1st place, gold medalist(s)
2018 Commonwealth Games	2nd place, silver medalist(s)
2018 Netball Quad Series (September)	1st place, gold medalist(s)
2019 Netball Quad Series	1st place, gold medalist(s)
2021 Constellation Cup	2nd place, silver medalist(s)

== Honours ==
Australia

- Netball Quad Series
  - Winners: 2016, 2017 (January/February), 2018 (September), 2018 (January), 2019
  - Runners Up: 2017 (August/September)
- Commonwealth Games
  - Runners Up: 2018

Queensland Firebirds

- ANZ Championship
  - Winners: 2015, 2016
  - Runners Up: 2013, 2014

New South Wales

- Australian National Netball Championships
  - Winners: Under-19 (2011), Under-21 (2011, 2012)
  - Runners Up: Under-19 (2010)
