= Helen Housby =

English international netball player (born 1995)

Helen Housby MBE
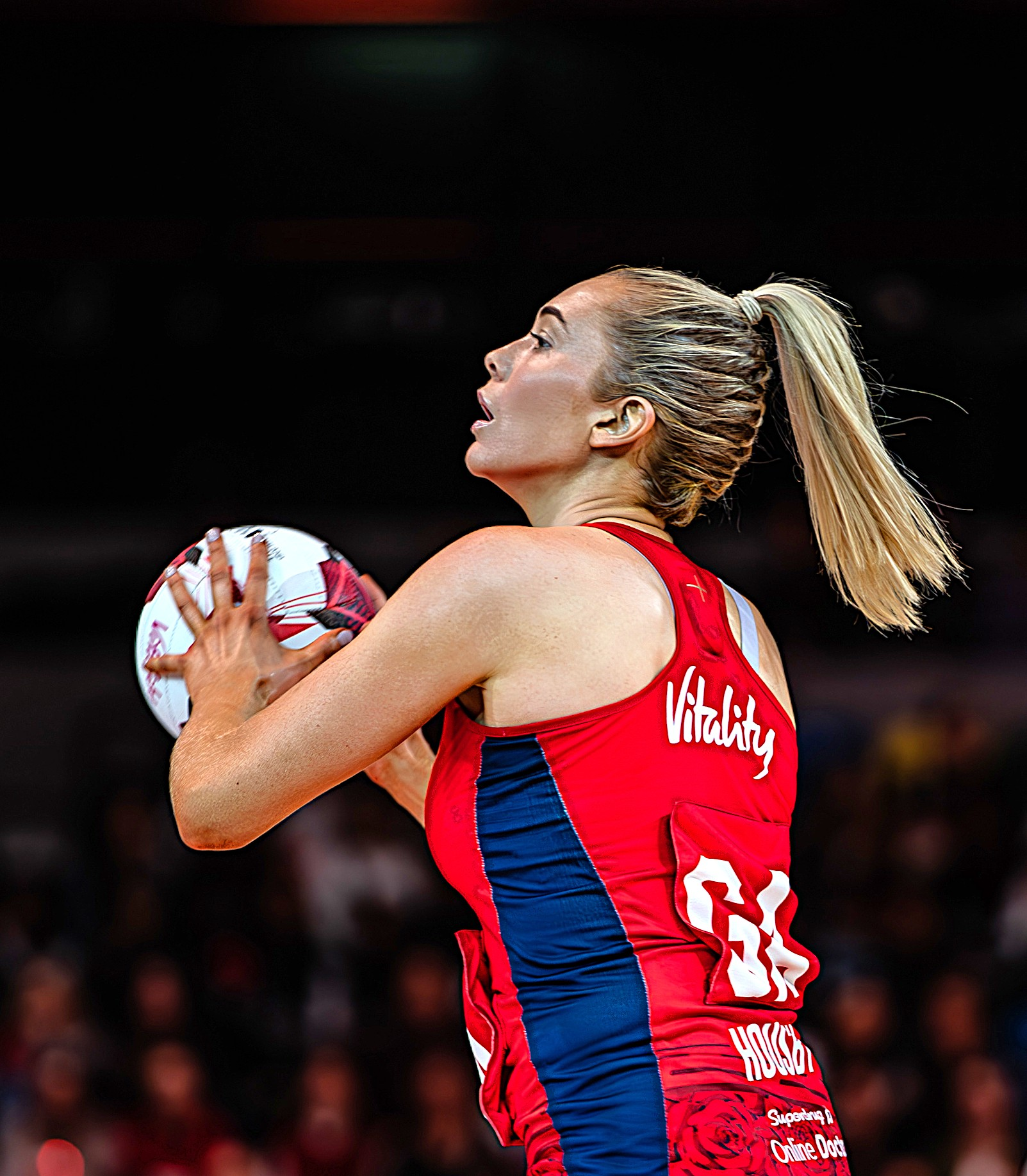

Personal information
- Born: 19 January 1995 (age 31) Carlisle, England
- Height: 1.83 m (6 ft 0 in)
- School: The Nelson Thomlinson School
- University: University of Manchester

Netball career
- Playing positions: GA, GS
Years	Club team	Apps
2013–2016	Manchester Thunder	
2017–Present	New South Wales Swifts	
Years	National team	Caps
2014–present	England	110
Medal record
Representing England
Commonwealth Games
Gold medal – first place	2018 Gold Coast	Netball
Netball World Cup
Bronze medal – third place	2019 Liverpool	Team
Silver medal – second place	2023 Cape Town	Team
Fast5 Netball World Series
Gold medal – first place	2017 Melbourne	Team
- Updated on April 2025

Helen Housby MBE (born 19 January 1995) is a professional English netball player. She has represented the England national netball team since 2014. Housby played netball for the Netball Super League side Manchester Thunder from 2013 to 2016, helping them win the 2014 Super League Grand-Final against rivals Surrey Storm. Since 2017 she plays for the New South Wales Swifts.

== Early life and education ==
Housby was born in Carlisle and grew up in rural Cumbria surrounded by animals. She studied zoology at the University of Manchester.

== Club career ==
=== Manchester Thunder ===
Spotted at 15 years old, she was brought into the Manchester Thunder pathway by Karen Greig and Tracey Neville. She made her debut for the senior team in 2013 and became a regular starter in the 2014 season where she helped the team win the 2014 Superleague Grand-Final against rivals Surrey Storm by scoring a long-range shot in the dying seconds of the game. She made the grand final again in 2016 but lost to Surrey Storm by 2 goals.

=== New South Wales Swifts ===
Housby joined Australian side New South Wales Swifts for the 2017 season. She was part of the Swifts team that won the Suncorp Super Netball in 2019 and 2021 and also made the final in 2023. She won the Swifts MVP award in 2023 and 2024.

== International career ==
Housby made her England national netball team debut at the 2014 Commonwealth Games where the team finished fourth. The next year she won bronze at the 2015 Netball World Cup.

She won a historic gold against Australia at the 2018 Commonwealth Games in Gold Coast, Australia - scoring in the final second of the game to give victory to England by one point. The England team had beaten Jamaica in the semi-final match by a single point, also from a last-minute goal. Jamaica had narrowly defeated England in Glasgow 2014 to take the bronze medal. The England team won BBC Sports Team of the Year Award and BBC Greatest Sporting Moment of the Year in 2018.

She was selected for England's 2019 Netball World Cup, and 2022 Commonwealth Games squad, finishing 3rd in both events. Housby was also part of the silver medal winning England team at the 2023 Netball World Cup. She was named player of the tournament and 'best shooter'.

Housby was appointed Member of the Order of the British Empire (MBE) in the 2024 New Year Honours for services to netball.

Tournaments	Place
2014 Commonwealth Games	4th
2015 Netball World Cup	3rd place, bronze medalist(s)
2016 Netball Quad Series	3rd
2016 Fast5 Netball World Series	4th
2017 Netball Quad Series (January/February)	3rd
2017 Netball Quad Series (August/September)	3rd
2017 Taini Jamison Trophy Series	2nd
2017 Fast5 Netball World Series	1st place, gold medalist(s)
2018 Netball Quad Series (January)	2nd
2018 Commonwealth Games	1st place, gold medalist(s)
2018 Netball Quad Series (September)	2nd
2019 Netball Quad Series	2nd
2019 Netball World Cup	3rd place, bronze medalist(s)
2023 Netball Quad Series	3rd
2023 Netball World Cup	2nd place, silver medalist(s)
2024 Taini Jamison Trophy Series	1st place, gold medalist(s)

== Personal life ==
Housby is an avid Manchester United F.C. fan, her role model was David Beckham. A video of Housby performing a TikTok dance during an England game went viral in 2022. It was posted by the official Commonwealth Games TikTok account and viewed over 1.1 million times.

== Honours ==
=== England ===
- Commonwealth Games
  - Gold: 2018
- Netball World Cup
  - Silver: 2023
  - Bronze: 2015, 2019
- Fast5 Netball World Series
  - Winners: 2017
- Taini Jamison Trophy
  - Winners: 2021
- Netball Quad Series
  - Runners Up: 2018 (Jan), 2018 (Sep), 2019
  - Third: 2023

=== Manchester Thunder ===
- Netball Superleague Grand Final
  - Winners: 2014
  - Runners Up: 2016

=== New South Wales Swifts ===
- Suncorp Super Netball
  - Winners: 2019, 2021
  - Runners Up: 2023
