= Liz Watson (netball) =

Australia netball international

Personal information
- Full name: Elizabeth Bruna Watson
- Born: 30 March 1994 (age 32) Carlton, Victoria, Australia
- Height: 178 cm (5 ft 10 in)
- Relatives: Steven Alessio (uncle); Matthew Watson (brother)
- School: Penleigh and Essendon Grammar School
- University: La Trobe University; Deakin University

Netball career
- Playing positions: C, WA
Years	Club team	Apps
2013	City West Falcons	
2013	Victorian Flames	
2014–2023	Melbourne Vixens	134
2024–	Sunshine Coast Lightning	29
Years	National team	Caps
2016–	Australia	91
Medal record
Representing Australia
Netball World Cup
Silver medal – second place	2019 Liverpool	Team
Gold medal – first place	2023 Cape Town	Team
Commonwealth Games
Silver medal – second place	2018 Gold Coast	Team
Gold medal – first place	2022 Birmingham	Team

Elizabeth Watson (born 30 March 1994), is an Australia netball international. Watson was a member of the Australia teams that won the gold medals at the 2022 Commonwealth games, and at the 2023 Netball World Cup. She also won silver medals at the 2018 Commonwealth Games and at the 2019 Netball World Cup. In 2018 and 2022 she received the Liz Ellis Diamond award. She captained Australia during the 2021 Constellation Cup. Since 2014, Watson has played for Melbourne Vixens, initially in the ANZ Championship and later in Super Netball. She was a member of the Vixens' teams that won premierships in 2014 and 2020. Watson moved to the Sunshine Coast Lightning for the 2024 season.

== Early life, family and education ==
Watson is originally from Melbourne. She was born in Carlton and raised in Pascoe Vale South. She is the daughter of Manuela and Neil Watson. Her mother's family are Italian. Her two uncles, Anthony and Steven Alessio, and her older brother, Matthew Watson, are all former Australian rules footballers. She attended Penleigh and Essendon Grammar School and La Trobe University, studying health science at the latter. As of 2022, Watson is currently studying for a Bachelor of Education (Primary) at Deakin University.

== Playing career ==
=== Netball Victoria ===
Watson began playing netball seriously from the age of 12. Her mother was a netball player and Watson credits her for teaching her how to play. She subsequently went on to represent Victoria at under-12, under-15, under-17, under-19 and under-21 levels. In 2012 she was a member of the Victoria under-19 team that won the Australian National Netball Championships. In 2013 she was a member of the Victoria under-21 team that were runners-up.

=== City West Falcons ===
In 2013, Watson played for City West Falcons in the Victorian Netball League, where she was coached by Nicole Richardson. She helped Falcons win the 2013 VNL title and was named Player of the Grand Final.

=== Victorian Flames ===
In 2013, Watson also captained Victorian Flames in the Australian Netball League. She was the Flames MVP for the season, helping them finish third in the ANL.

=== Melbourne Vixens ===
Between 2014 and 2023, Watson had played for Melbourne Vixens, initially in the ANZ Championship and later in Super Netball. She was called up for the Vixens team after Elissa Kent had to dropout due to pregnancy. Watson was a member of the Vixens' teams that won the 2014 ANZ Championship and was subsequently named Vixens' Rookie of the Year. In 2017, Watson was a member of the Vixens team that finished the inaugural Suncorp Super Netball regular season as minor premiers. She was also named the 2017 Young Star. Between 2017 and 2020, Watson was named as the wing attack in the Super Netball Team of the Year on four successive occasions. In 2017 and 2018 she was also named the Vixens' MVP, winning the Sharelle McMahon Medal. In 2020, Watson, alongside Kate Moloney, co-captained Vixens when they finished the season as both minor premiers and overall champions. Watson missed the 2021 season due to a long-standing foot injury that needed surgery. She successfully returned to play following her injury in the 2022 season.

=== Sunshine Coast Lightning ===
Following the 2023 season, Watson confirmed her exit from the Melbourne Vixens, having signed a three-year deal with the Sunshine Coast Lightning. She debuted for her new club in round one of the 2024 season.

=== Australia ===
Watson made her senior debut for Australia on 20 January 2016 during an away series against England. Watson was a member of the Australia teams that won the silver medals at the 2018 Commonwealth Games and at the 2019 Netball World Cup. In 2018 she was awarded the Liz Ellis Diamond award and was named Australian International Player of the Year. Watson captained Australia during the 2021 Constellation Cup. In September 2021 she was confirmed as Australia's captain. Watson was a member of the Australian teams that won gold medal at the 2022 Commonwealth Games, and at the 2023 Netball World Cup.

Tournaments	Place
2016 Netball Quad Series	1st place, gold medalist(s)
2017 Netball Quad Series (August/September)	2nd place, silver medalist(s)
2018 Netball Quad Series (January)	1st place, gold medalist(s)
2018 Commonwealth Games	2nd place, silver medalist(s)
2018 Netball Quad Series (September)	1st place, gold medalist(s)
2019 Netball Quad Series	1st place, gold medalist(s)
2019 Netball World Cup	2nd place, silver medalist(s)
2019 Constellation Cup	1st place, gold medalist(s)
2021 Constellation Cup	2nd place, silver medalist(s)
2022 Netball Quad Series	1st place, gold medalist(s)
2022 Commonwealth Games	1st place, gold medalist(s)
2023 Netball Quad Series	1st place, gold medalist(s)
2023 Netball World Cup	1st place, gold medalist(s)
2023 Constellation Cup	1st
2024 Netball Nations Cup	1st
2024 Australia England netball series	1st
2024 Constellation Cup	2nd
2025 Australia South Africa netball series	1st
2025 Constellation Cup	1st

== Honours ==
Australia

- Netball World Cup
  - Winners: 2023
  - Runners up: 2019
- Commonwealth Games
  - Winners: 2022
  - Runners Up: 2018
- Constellation Cup
  - Winners: 2016, 2017, 2018, 2019, 2023, 2025
  - Runners Up: 2021, 2024
- Netball Quad Series
  - Winners: 2016, 2018 (September), 2018 (January), 2019, 2022, 2023
  - Runners Up: 2017 (August/September)

Melbourne Vixens

- Super Netball
  - Winners: 2020
  - Minor Premierships: 2017, 2020
- ANZ Championship
  - Winners: 2014
  - Minor Premierships: 2014

City West Falcons

- Victorian Netball League
  - Winners: 2013

Victoria

- Australian National Netball Championships
  - Winners: Under-19 (2012)
  - Runners-up: Under-21 (2013)

Individual Awards

Year	Award
2013	Victorian Flames Most Valuable Player
2014	Vixens' Rookie of the Year
2017	Sharelle McMahon Medal
2017	Super Netball Young Star Award
2017	Super Netball Team of the Year
2018	Sharelle McMahon Medal
2018	Super Netball Team of the Year
2018	Liz Ellis Diamond
2018	Australian International Player of the Year
2019	Super Netball Team of the Year
2020	Super Netball Team of the Year
2022	Liz Ellis Diamond
2022	Super Netball Team of the Year
2022	Australian International Player of the Year
