= Nicholé Breedt =

South Africa netball international

Personal information
- Full name: Nicholé Breedt (née: Taljaard)
- Born: 3 May 1997 (age 29) Cape Town, South Africa
- Height: 1.77 m (5 ft 10 in)
- School: Stellenberg High School
- University: Stellenbosch University

Netball career
- Playing positions: GA, WA, GS
Years	Club team	Apps
202x-2024	Western Cape Southern Stings	
2024–	London Pulse	
Years	National team	Caps
2022–	South Africa	29
Medal record
Representing South Africa
World University Netball Championship
Silver medal – second place	2018 Kampala	Team
Fast5 Netball World Series
Silver medal – second place	2022 Christchurch	Team

Nicholé Breedt (née Taljaard; born 3 May 1997) is a South African international netball player who plays as GA for London Pulse in the Netball Super League.

She scored the final goal in South Africas historic draw against New Zealand at the Cape Town International Convention Centre during the 2023 Netball World Cup.

== Early life and education ==
She began playing netball at the age of five. She was a regular in Stellenberg High School's netball first team and represented the school at national level. Breedt then obtained a BSc in Sports Science as well as a postgraduate certificate in education at Stellenbosch University, where she also played for their varsity netball team, known as the Maties.

== Club career ==
Breedt represented the Western Cape Southern Stings in the Telkom Netball League where she was also named as captain.

=== London Pulse ===
Breedt was signed by London Pulse for the 2024 Netball Superleague season. She helped the side win their first Super League Grand final in 2025, defeating Loughborough Lightning 53–45.

== International career ==
=== Junior international career ===
As an 18-year-old, Taljaard was named in the South African under-21 squad ahead of the youth Netball World Cup the following year but she tore her anterior cruciate ligament (ACL) in a Telkom Netball League match require 12 months recovery.

=== Senior international career ===
She made her senior international debut for South Africa during the 2022 Commonwealth Games in a pool stage match against Wales on 3 August 2022. She was also a key member of the South African squad which emerged as runners-up to Australia in the final of the 2022 Fast5 Netball World Series.

She was included in the South African squad for the 2023 Netball World Cup, which was also her maiden appearance at a Netball World Cup tournament. She played a huge part in securing a historic tie for Proteas against defending world champions New Zealand which ended 48–48. She scored the crucial equalizer in the last quarter of the match when South Africa were five points behind with five minutes remaining in the match. The tie also meant South Africa was still in the hunt to progress to the semi-final of their home World Cup campaign, provided they beat neighbouring Uganda by a margin of over 50 points. However, hosts South Africa could not progress to the semi-final despite winning their crucial game against Uganda 52–50.

== Personal life ==
Breedt became engaged to long term partner Tommie Breedt in 2021, and married in 2024. She has described herself as an introvert, as she often spends her time staying at home, and she insists she goes largely unnoticed.

== Honours ==
=== South Africa ===
- Fast5 Netball World Series: Runners up: 2022

=== London Pulse ===
- Netball Super League: 2025
