= Karla Pretorius =

South African netball player

Personal information
- Born: Karla Mostert; 12 March 1990 (age 36) East London, South Africa
- Occupation: Professional Netball Player / Dietician
- Height: 1.81 m (5 ft 11 1/2 in)
- Spouse: Werner Pretorius (m. 2017)
- School: Laerskool Hennopspark, Hoërskool Zwartkop, Centurion
- University: University of the Free State

Netball career
- Playing positions: GD, WD
Years	Club team	Apps
2009–2015	UFS Kovsies	
2013–2016	Free State Crinums	
2016	Team Bath	
2016–2023	Sunshine Coast Lightning	
Years	National team	Caps
2011–	South Africa	77
Medal record
Representing South Africa
World University Netball Championship
Gold medal – first place	2016 Miami	Team
Silver medal – second place	2012 Cape Town	Team
Fast5 Netball World Series
Bronze medal – third place	2012 Auckland	Team

Karla Pretorius (née Mostert; born 12 March 1990) is a South African netball player, and has represented her country with the South Africa national netball team. She plays in the positions of Goal Defence (GD) and Wing Defence (WD).

She previously played for the Sunshine Coast Lightning in the Suncorp Super Netball competition.

== International career - Team Bath and Sunshine Coast Lightning ==
Before joining the Sunshine Coast Lightning, Pretorius played for the UK based Team Bath in the Netball Superleague alongside fellow Protea teammate Lenize Potgieter. Pretorius currently plays for Sunshine Coast Lightning in the Australian Super Netball league, and has won back-to-back premierships with the club (in 2017 and 2018). In 2017 she won the MVP award for her performance in the Grand Final. She then shared the club's Player of the Year award with teammate Stephanie Wood for their performance in the 2018 season. She was named in the Super Netball team of the year 2018. She is the first South African to feature in the Super Netball league. Unlike South Africa, in Australia netball is a professional sport, which means that Pretorius is being paid to do what she loves most.

Pretorius and her husband, Werner Pretorius, married on 9 September 2017. On 13 December 2021, she announced her pregnancy and therefore had to withdraw from next year's competitions, promising to be back in 2023.

== South Africa national netball team ==
Pretorius is the vice-captain of the South Africa national netball team. Pretorius holds 77 senior South African caps, including appearances at the Commonwealth Games (2014 and 2018) and the Netball World Cup (2015). She participated in the 2011 World Netball Series, held in Liverpool, UK, the INF Netball World Cup 2015 held in Sydney, Australia, the 2014 Glasgow Commonwealth Games and the 2018 Gold Coast Commonwealth Games. Pretorius confirmed her status as one of international netball's standout defenders with a series of tenacious performances at the 2015 Netball World Cup held in Sydney, Australia. She made the most intercepts of any player – 28 in total – as South Africa finished fifth overall in the tournament. She also played for the Spar Proteas U/21 side and having made her international debut for the Proteas in 2011. Pretorius was named the Player of the Tournament at the 2019 Vitality Netball World Cup held in Liverpool, England. South Africa finished fourth at the 2023 Netball World Cup after managing to beat Jamaica by 55 goals to 52. The Proteas narrowly lost against world number 1 the Australian Diamonds during the semi-finals with 55 over 53 of South Africa.

== Career at the University of the Free State and Free State Crinums ==
Karla previously played for the netball team of the University of the Free State (Kovsies), between 2009 and 2015. She represented Free State Crinums who won back to back titles in 2014 and 2015 Brutal Fruit Netball Cup. Karla was awarded the 2014 and 2015 Varsity Netball Player of the Tournament award.

Karla completed her Bachelors in Dietetics at the University of the Free State and obtained her Masters in Dietetics at the institution early 2019. She is currently reading towards a Diploma in Sports Management through the University of South Africa (UNISA). She worked as a community dietitian in Bloemfontein during 2015. She was also named as Sportswoman of the Year by the University of the Free State in 2015. KovsieSport awarded Karla as UFS Sportswoman of the Year in 2016. In 2017, Pretorius was named one of Mail & Guardian 200 Young South Africans.
