= Khanyisa Chawane =

South African netball player (born 1996)

Personal information
- Born: 14 January 1996 (age 30) Tzaneen, South Africa
- Education: Hoërskool Ben Vorster
- Height: 1.67 m (5 ft 5 1/2 in)

Sport
- Sport: Netball

Khanyisa Chawane (born 14 January 1996) is a South African netball player. She was selected to represent the South African netball team at the 2019 Netball World Cup and the 2023 Netball World Cup hosted in South Africa.

For the 2023 Telkom Netball League she presented the Free State Crinums. Chawane will represent the Cardiff Dragons ahead of the 2024 Netball Super League Season. At the end of 2023 Chawane ended with 82 caps for Spar Proteas.
