= Heartfelt Arena =

Private multifunctional arena in Pretoria, South Africa

- Interactive map of Heartfelt Arena
- Former names: Saambou Arena
- Address: 1000 Voortrekker Rd, Thaba Tshwane, Pretoria, 0027; Pretoria; South Africa
- Coordinates: 25°46′44″S 28°10′01″E

Website
- www.heartfeltarena.co.za

The Heartfelt Arena (formerly Saambou Arena) is a private multipurpose arena for sporting and cultural events in Pretoria, South Africa. It was originally built for the South African Defence Force (SADF).

The Indoor Hockey World Cup competition took place in the arena in February 2023. The arena also hosted the Idols casting competition and is the venue for numerous netball league game. On 30 April - 2 May 2026 it hosted the African Rhythmic Gymnastics Championships.
