= Ine-Marí Venter =

South African netball player

Personal information
- Born: 21 April 1995 (age 31) Pretoria, South Africa
- Height: 1.92 m (6 ft 4 in)
- School: Hoër Volkskool Potchefstroom

Netball career
- Playing positions: GS, GA
Years	Club team	Apps
2015–2018	Gauteng Jaguars	
2019	Melbourne Vixens	
2020	Queensland Firebirds	
2021 -	Saracens Mavericks	
Years	National team	Caps
2016–present	South Africa	51

Ine-Marí Venter (born 21 April 1995) is a South African netball player in the Suncorp Super Netball league, playing for the Queensland Firebirds.

== Career ==
Venter began her netball career playing for the Gauteng Jaguars in the South African Brutal Fruit Netball Cup. She was quickly selected for the South African senior national team, having previously represented the under-19 national team as early as 2014. Venter was spotted by Melbourne Vixens head coach Simone McKinnis whilst representing South Africa at the 2018 Commonwealth Games and later that year she was signed by the Vixens for the 2019 season. Venter made three appearances for the Vixens before being signed to the Queensland Firebirds ahead of the 2020 season.
