= Maryka Holtzhausen =

South African netball player (born 1987)

Personal information
- Born: 2 June 1987 (age 39) Kempton Park, South Africa
- Height: 1.81 m (5 ft 11 1/2 in)
- School: Hoërskool Kempton Park
- University: University of the Free State

Netball career
- Playing positions: GA, WA
Years	Club team	Apps
2015	Loughborough Lightning	
2018-present	Severn Stars	
Years	National team	Caps
Medal record
Representing South Africa
World University Netball Championship
Silver medal – second place	2012 Cape Town	Team
Fast5 Netball World Series
Bronze medal – third place	2012 Auckland	Team

Maryka Holtzhausen (born 2 June 1987) is a former South African netball player. She played in the positions of GA and WA. She was a member of the South Africa national netball team, and competed in the 2010 Commonwealth Games in Delhi and the 2011 World Netball Championships in Singapore. She also participated in the 2010 World Netball Series and the 2011 World Netball Series. She played in the 2012 Netball Quad Series, and in the same year, she won a bronze medal in 2012 Fast5 Netball World Series with the Fast5 Proteas.

Holtzhausen was the first player from her country to line up in the UK's leading competition, the Netball Superleague, joining Loughborough Lightning for the 2015 season. She has also played for Free State Crinums and Spar Proteas She's played for Severn Stars for the 2018 season and she'll be back for the 2019 season.

In November 2018 Holtzhausen was the second player in South Africa national netball team team history to receive her 100th cap.
