= Netball South Africa =

Netball governing body

- Sport: Netball
- Jurisdiction: South Africa
- Abbreviation: NSA
- Affiliation: World Netball; Africa Netball
- President: Mami Diale

Official website
- www.netball-sa.org.za

Netball South Africa is the main governing body for netball in South Africa. It is affiliated to World Netball and Africa Netball. It is responsible for organising and administering the South Africa national netball team, the South Africa men's national netball team, the Diamond Challenge and the Telkom Netball League, as well as numerous other leagues and competitions for junior and youth teams. Its headquarters are based in Arcadia, Pretoria.

== History ==
=== Early years ===
In 1951, the all-white South African Women's Netball Association was established. In 1957, their president represented South Africa at the inaugural International Netball Conference in London. In 1960, South Africa were founder members of the International Federation of Netball Associations.

=== Post apartheid era ===
In 1992, with the end of the sporting boycott during the apartheid era, Netball South Africa became the new governing body for netball in South Africa. In 2000, the NSA was criticised by a Parliament of South Africa committee for being "too old and too white."

=== Controversy ===
In April 2025, World Netball suspended Netball SA president Cecilia Molokwane. Netball South Africa then appeared before the Portfolio Committee on Sport, Arts and Culture, facing criticism for lengthy delays in releasing audited financial reports, and over unexplained expenses relating to the R90 million grants awarded for the hosting of the 2023 Netball World Cup.

Netball SA removed Molokwane from her position in October 2025.

== Executive Management ==
Role	Occupier
President	Mami Diale
Vice President	Khosi Dlamini
CEO	Adam Brooke
Director of Selections	Lana Krige
Director of Demarcation and Structures	Claudine Claassen
Director of Coaching	Dumisani Chauke
Director of Umpires	Magriet Bester
