= Premier Netball League (South Africa) =

Top level netball league in South Africa

- Sport: Netball
- Founded: 2014; 12 years ago
- Administrator: Netball South Africa
- Divisions: 2
- No. of teams: 15
- Country: South Africa
- Continent: Africa
- Most recent champion: Gauteng Golden Fireballs (2nd title)
- Most titles: Gauteng Jaguars (6 titles)
- Broadcaster: SuperSport
- Sponsor: Telkom
- Level on pyramid: 1–2
- Website: Telkom Netball League

The Premier Netball League is the top level netball league featuring teams from South Africa. It was formed in 2014 and is organised by Netball South Africa. Between 2014 and 2018, due to sponsorship and naming rights arrangements, the league was known as the Brutal Fruit Netball Cup. Since 2019, the league has been sponsored by Telkom and, as a result, it is widely known as the Telkom Netball League. In 2014, Free State Crinums were the inaugural winners. Gauteng Jaguars are the league's most successful team, having won six titles. The league features two divisions and uses a promotion and relegation format. The winners of the Division Two Shield can gain promotion to Division One by winning a play off.

== History ==
=== Inaugural season ===
Brutal Fruit Netball Cup era logo

In 2014, Free State Crinums, Eastern Cape Aloes, Gauteng Golden Fireballs, Gauteng Jaguars and North West Flames, became founder members of Division One of the Brutal Fruit Netball Cup. Limpopo Baobabs, together with Southern Stings, Kingdom Stars, Mpumalanga Sunbirds and Northern Cape Diamonds, became founder members of Division Two. Free State Crinums were subsequently the inaugural Division One champions after defeating Jaguars 40–36 in the final. Southern Stings won the inaugural Division Two Shield, after defeating Kingdom Stars 39–31 in the final. Stings went on to gain promotion to Division One after defeating Eastern Cape Aloes 52–40 in a play off.

=== Free State Crinums ===
Between 2014 and 2016, with teams coached by Burta de Kock, captained by Maryka Holtzhausen and featuring Karla Pretorius, Free State Crinums won three successive titles. On each occasion they defeated Gauteng Jaguars in the final. In 2024, Crinums, with a team coached by Martha Mosoahle-Samm and featuring a returning Pretorius, won a fourth title.

=== Gauteng Jaguars ===
Between 2017 and 2021, Gauteng Jaguars won five successive titles. In 2017, with a team coached by Jenny van Dyk and captained by Shadine van der Merwe, they won their first title after defeating North West Flames 49–43 in the final. With teams featuring Marlize de Bruin and Izette Griesel, they retained the title in 2018, 2019, 2020 and 2021. In 2022, Gauteng Golden Fireballs, with a team captained by Bongiwe Msomi, because just the third team to win the title when they beat Jaguars 35–32 in the final. However in 2023, Jaguars returned to win their sixth title.

=== Expansion ===
In 2014, when the league was founded, it featured ten teams divided into two divisions, Division One and Division Two. Each division featured five teams. In 2019, for one season only, three invitational teams – SPAR Smileys, President's Stars and Zimbabwe – played a series of exhibition matches alongside the league program. The former two were effectively home based members of the South Africa women's national team and the South Africa men's national netball team respectively. Zimbabwe used the series as preparation for the 2019 Netball World Cup.

In 2020 two new teams, Kingdom Queens and Western Cape Tornados, were added to Division Two. In 2021, they were joined by Eastern Cape Comets. Ahead of the 2023 season, Free State Sonoblomo and Limpopo Lilies joined Division Two. The league now featured fifteen teams. This also saw Kingdom Stars reinstated in Division One, despite losing the 2022 promotion/relegation play off.

The 2025 Division One will feature two additional teams in the SPAR Baby Proteas and the Zimbabwe.

== 2026 teams ==
=== Division A ===
Team	City/Suburb	Province
Eastern Cape Aloes		Eastern Cape
Free State Crinums	University of the Free State	Free State
Gauteng Golden Fireballs		Gauteng
Gauteng Jaguars	University of Pretoria	Gauteng
Kingdom Stars	Durban	KwaZulu-Natal
Southern Stings		Western Cape
North West Flames		North West

=== Division B ===
Team	City/Suburb	Province
Eastern Cape Comets		Eastern Cape
Free State Sonoblomo		Free State
Kingdom Queens		KwaZulu-Natal
Limpopo Baobabs	Polokwane	Limpopo
Limpopo Lillies		Limpopo
Mpumalanga Sunbirds		Mpumalanga
Northern Cape Diamonds		Northern Cape
North West Tshukudu		North West
Western Cape Tornadoes		Western Cape

== Finals ==
=== Division A ===
Season	Winners	Score	Runners Up	Venue
2014	Free State Crinums	40–36	Gauteng Jaguars	University of Pretoria
2015	Free State Crinums	61–59	Gauteng Jaguars	University of Pretoria
2016	Free State Crinums	52–43	Gauteng Jaguars	Olive Centre, Durban
2017	Gauteng Jaguars	49–43	North West Flames	Mangaung Indoor Centre, Bloemfontein
2018	Gauteng Jaguars	51–43	Southern Stings	University of Pretoria
2019	Gauteng Jaguars	53–38	Southern Stings	University of Pretoria
2020	Gauteng Jaguars	38–26	Free State Crinums	Mangaung Indoor Sports Center, Bloemfontein
2021	Gauteng Jaguars	53–41	Southern Stings	Rustenburg
2022	Gauteng Golden Fireballs	35–32	Gauteng Jaguars	Heartfelt Arena
2023	Gauteng Jaguars	59–51	Free State Crinums	Heartfelt Arena
2024	Free State Crinums	47–46	Gauteng Jaguars	Ellis Park Arena
2025	Gauteng Golden Fireballs	47–40	Free State Crinums	Durban ICC

=== Division B Shield ===
Season	Winners	Score	Runners Up	Venue
2014	Southern Stings	39–31	Kingdom Stars	University of Pretoria
2015	Kingdom Stars	38–35	Eastern Cape Aloes	University of Pretoria
2019	Kingdom Stars	45–43	Eastern Cape Aloes	University of Pretoria
2020	Eastern Cape Aloes	35–31	Kingdom Queens	Mangaung Indoor Sports Center, Bloemfontein
2021	Eastern Cape Aloes		Western Cape Tornados	Rustenburg
2022	Eastern Cape Aloes	48–43	Mpumalanga Sunbirds	Heartfelt Arena
2023	Limpopo Baobabs	65–40	Western Cape Tornados	Heartfelt Arena
2024	Kingdom Stars	37–35	Eastern Cape Comets	Ellis Park Arena
2025	Kingdom Stars	43–33	Western Cape Tornados	Durban ICC

== Promotion/Relegation ==
Season	Winners	Score	Runners Up	Venue
2014	Southern Stings	52–40	Eastern Cape Aloes	University of Pretoria
2015	Gauteng Golden Fireballs		Kingdom Stars	University of Pretoria
2019	Kingdom Stars	59–57	Gauteng Golden Fireballs	University of Pretoria
2020	Kingdom Stars	54–30	Eastern Cape Aloes	Mangaung Indoor Sports Center, Bloemfontein
2021	North West Flames	49–40	Eastern Cape Aloes	Rustenburg
2022	Eastern Cape Aloes	42–39	Kingdom Stars	Heartfelt Arena
2023	Limpopo Baobabs	55–37	Kingdom Stars	Heartfelt Arena
2024	Limpopo Baobabs	65–40	Kingdom Stars	Ellis Park Arena
2025	Kingdom Stars	60–42	Limpopo Baobabs	Durban ICC

== Sponsorship ==
Sponsors	Seasons
Brutal Fruit	2014–2018
Telkom	2019–
