= Malawi at the 2018 Commonwealth Games =

- Flag of Malawi
- CGF code: MAW
- CGA: Olympic and Commonwealth Games Association of Malawi

in Gold Coast, Australia 4 April 2018 – 15 April 2018
- Competitors: 19 in 2 sports
- Flag bearer: Joyce Mvula
- Medals: Gold 0 Silver 0 Bronze 0 Total 0

Commonwealth Games appearances (overview)
- 1970; 1974; 1978; 1982; 1986; 1990; 1994; 1998; 2002; 2006; 2010; 2014; 2018; 2022; 2026; 2030

Other related appearances
- Rhodesia and Nyasaland (1962)

Malawi competed at the 2018 Commonwealth Games in the Gold Coast, Australia from April 4 to April 15, 2018.

Netball athlete Joyce Mvula was the country's flag bearer during the opening ceremony.

== Competitors ==
The following is the list of number of competitors participating at the Games per sport/discipline.

Sport	Men	Women	Total
Athletics (track and field)	7	0	7
Netball	—	12	12
Total	7	12	19

== Athletics ==
Men
Track & road events

Athlete	Event	Heat		Semifinal		Final	
Athlete	Event	Result	Rank	Result	Rank	Result	Rank
Dalitso Gunde	400 m	51.59	8	did not advance			
Golden Gunde	400 m	48.39	6	did not advance			
Benedicto Makumba	800 m	1:57.22	9	—		did not advance	
Chauncy Master	5000 m	—				14:50.25	15
Grevazio Mpani	5000 m	—				14:30.66	13
Kefasi Chitsala	10000 m	—				29:21.68	12
Happy Ndacha Mchenlenje	Marathon	—				2:45:31	17

== Netball ==
Malawi qualified a netball team by virtue of being ranked in the top 11 (excluding the host nation, Australia) of the INF World Rankings on July 1, 2017.

The following is the Malawi roster in the netball tournament of the 2018 Commonwealth Games.

Malawi national netball team – 2018 Commonwealth Games roster
Players
Coaches

Pos.	Name	Age - DOB	Ht.	Club	Club nat.
	Chimaliro, Jane	-	–	Civonets	(Malawi)
	Dambo, Martha	-	–	Thunder Queens	(Malawi)
	Galleta, Thandie	-	–	Thunder Queens	(Malawi)
	Kachilika, Joanna (C)	-	–	Thunder Queens	(Malawi)
	Kumwenda, Bridget	-	–	Kukoma Diamonds	(Malawi)
	Kumwenda, Mwai	-	–	Melbourne Vixens	(Australia)
	Lwazi, Takondwa	-	–	Blue Eagles Sisters	(Malawi)
	Mtukule, Caroline	-	–	Kukoma Diamonds	(Malawi)
	Mvula, Joyce	-	–	Manchester Thunder	(England)
	Ngwira, Loreen	-	–	Team Northumbria	(England)
	Simtowe, Sindi	-	–	Tigresses	(Malawi)
	Vinkhumbo, Towera	-	–	Kukoma Diamonds	(Malawi)

Head coach

Whyte Mulilima

Legend

- (C) Team captain
- Club field describes current pro club
- Injured

Pool B

Pos	Team	Pld	W	D	L	GF	GA	GD	Pts	Qualification
1	England	5	5	0	0	342	202	+140	10	Semi-finals
2	New Zealand	5	3	0	2	292	235	+57	6	Semi-finals
3	Uganda	5	3	0	2	287	248	+39	6	Classification matches
4	Malawi	5	3	0	2	277	284	−7	6	Classification matches
5	Scotland	5	1	0	4	195	289	−94	2	Classification matches
6	Wales	5	0	0	5	215	350	−135	0	Classification matches

Updated to match(es) played on 11 April 2018. Source: GC2018

6 April 2018
18:30

Report
Malawi
49–74
England

Gold Coast Convention and Exhibition Centre
Umpires: Marc Henning
Jono Bredin
Reserve umpire: Maria van der Merwe
Kumwenda 31/33 (94%)
Mvula 10/11 (91%)
Chimaliro 7/7 (100%)
Simtowe 1/3 (33%)

Harten 48/54 (89%)
Housby 14/18 (78%)
Corbin 6/7 (86%)
Haythornthwaite 6/7 (86%)

7 April 2018
13:00

Report
Uganda
54–52
Malawi

Gold Coast Convention and Exhibition Centre
Umpires: Joshua Bowring
Gary Burgess
Reserve umpire: Jono Bredin
Proscovia 35/38 (92%)
Nanyonga 19/21 (90%)

Kumwenda 43/47 (91%)
Chimaliro 8/10 (80%)
Simtow 1/1 (100%)

8 April 2018
18:30

Report
Malawi
57–53
New Zealand

Gold Coast Convention and Exhibition Centre
Umpires: Joshua Bowring
Gary Burgess
Reserve umpire: Theresa Prince
Kumwenda 41/46 (89%)
Chimaliro 16/20 (80%)

Folau 31/39 (79%)
Selby-Rickit 15/17 (88%)
Mes 7/12 (58%)
Ekenasio 0/2 (0%)

10 April 2018
15:00

Report
Scotland
50–51
Malawi

Gold Coast Convention and Exhibition Centre
Umpires: Jono Bredin
Lisa McPhail
Reserve umpire: Kristie Simpson
Goodwin 38/42 (90%)
Gallagher 12/15 (80%)

Kumwenda 44/47 (94%)
Chimaliro 7/8 (88%)

11 April 2018
19:00

Report
Malawi
68–53
Wales

Gold Coast Convention and Exhibition Centre
Umpires: Joshua Bowring
Jono Bredin
Reserve umpire: Jackie Mizon
Kumwenda 47/50 (94%)
Chimaliro 18/18 (100%)
Simtowe 3/4 (75%)

Lewis 41/53 (77%)
Llewlyn 9/10 (90%)
Moseley 3/5 (60%)

Seventh place match

12 April 2018
14:00

Report
Malawi
60–52
Northern Ireland

Gold Coast Convention and Exhibition Centre
Umpires: Kristie Simpson
Theresa Prince
Reserve umpire: Jono Bredin
Kumwenda 48/51 (94%)
Chimaliro 8/10 (80%)
Mvula 4/7 (57%)

L. Bowman 33/38 (87%)
K. Bowman 9/11 (82%)
Lennon 6/9 (67%)
McCullough 4/7 (57%)

== See also ==
- Malawi at the 2018 Summer Youth Olympics
