= Malawi at the 2014 Commonwealth Games =

- CGF code: MAW
- CGA: Olympic and Commonwealth Games Association of Malawi

in Glasgow, Scotland
- Competitors: 30 in 8 sports
- Flag bearer: Mataya Tsoyo
- Medals: Gold 0 Silver 0 Bronze 0 Total 0

Commonwealth Games appearances (overview)
- 1970; 1974; 1978; 1982; 1986; 1990; 1994; 1998; 2002; 2006; 2010; 2014; 2018; 2022; 2026; 2030

Other related appearances
- Rhodesia and Nyasaland (1962)

Malawi competed in the 2014 Commonwealth Games in Glasgow, Scotland, from 23 July to 3 August 2014.

== Athletics ==
Key

- Note–Ranks given for track events are within the athlete's heat only
- Q = Qualified for the next round
- q = Qualified for the next round as a fastest loser or, in field events, by position without achieving the qualifying target
- NR = National record
- N/A = Round not applicable for the event

Men
Track & road events

| Athlete | Event | Heat | | Semifinal | | Final | |
| Athlete | Event | Result | Rank | Result | Rank | Result | Rank |
|---|---|---|---|---|---|---|---|
| Golden Gunde | 200 m | 22.39 | 63 | Did not advance | | | |
| Golden Gunde | 400 m | 47.85 | 34 | Did not advance | | | |
| Kefasi Chitsala | 1500 m | 3:55.95 | 23 | — | | Did not advance | |
| Kefasi Chitsala | 5000 m | — | | | | 14:26.01 | 20 |
| Chauncy Master | 1500 m | 3:46.59 | 22 | — | | Did not advance | |
| Chauncy Master | 5000 m | — | | | | 14:11.61 | 19 |
| Francis Khanje | Marathon | — | | | | 2:31:19 | 22 |

Women
Track & road events

| Athlete | Event | Heat | | Semifinal | | Final | |
| Athlete | Event | Result | Rank | Result | Rank | Result | Rank |
|---|---|---|---|---|---|---|---|
| Faith Labana | 800 m | 2:27.48 | 29 | Did not advance | | | |
| Tereza Master | Marathon | — | | | | 2:50:54 | 15 |

== Boxing ==
Men

| Athlete | Event | Round of 32 | Round of 16 | Quarterfinals | Semifinals | Final | |
| Athlete | Event | Opposition Result | Opposition Result | Opposition Result | Opposition Result | Opposition Result | Rank |
|---|---|---|---|---|---|---|---|
| Steven Thanki | Light welterweight | Pius (TAN); L 0 - 3 | Did not advance | | | | |
| Chikondi Makawa | Middleweight | Bye | Olivier (MRI); L 0 - 3 | Did not advance | | | |

== Cycling ==
=== Mountain biking ===
| Athlete | Event | Time | Rank |
|---|---|---|---|
| Missi Kathumba | Men's cross-country | DNS | |
| Leonard Tsoyo | Men's cross-country | DNS | |

=== Road ===
Men

| Athlete | Event | Time | Rank |
|---|---|---|---|
| Missi Kathumba | Road race | DNF | |
| Missi Kathumba | Time trial | 1:05:35.36 | 54 |
| Leonard Tsoyo | Road race | DNF | |
| Leonard Tsoyo | Time trial | 1:05:07.13 | 53 |

== Judo ==
Men

| Athlete | Event | Round of 32 | Round of 16 | Quarterfinal | Semifinal | Repechage | Final / BM | Rank |
| Athlete | Event | Opposition Result | Opposition Result | Opposition Result | Opposition Result | Opposition Result | Opposition Result | Rank |
|---|---|---|---|---|---|---|---|---|
| Emmanuel Ndawu | −66 kg | B Luzia (MOZ); L 0000-1100 | Did not advance | | | | | |
| Alfred Linguni | −81 kg | Bye | L Krieber-Gagnon (CAN); L 0000-1000 | Did not advance | | | | |

== Netball ==
Roster

- Jane Chimaliro
- Joanna Kachilika
- Tina Kamzati
- Mwai Kumwenda
- Takondwa Lwazi
- Beatrice Mpinganjira
- Caroline Mtukule
- Joyce Mvula
- Grace Mwafulirwa
- Loreen Ngwira
- Sindi Simtowe
- Towera Vikhumbo

Pool A

| Team | Pld | W | L | PF | PA | PD | Pts | Qualification |
|---|---|---|---|---|---|---|---|---|
| New Zealand | 5 | 5 | 0 | 337 | 151 | +186 | 10 | Semi-finals |
| Jamaica | 5 | 4 | 1 | 344 | 184 | +160 | 8 | Semi-finals |
| Malawi | 5 | 3 | 2 | 299 | 244 | +55 | 6 | |
| Northern Ireland | 5 | 2 | 3 | 211 | 286 | −75 | 4 | |
| Scotland | 5 | 1 | 4 | 165 | 268 | −103 | 2 | |
| Saint Lucia | 5 | 0 | 5 | 141 | 364 | −223 | 0 | |

Source: glasgow2014.com

24 July 2014
11:30

Report
Malawi
71 – 50
Northern Ireland

SECC Precinct
Umpires:
Gary Burgess (ENG)
Rachael Ayre (AUS)
Reserve umpire:
Clare McCabe (AUS)
Chimaliro 6/7 (86%)
Kumwenda 44/47 (94%)
Simtowe 21/21 (100%)

Lennon 20/21 (95%)
McCullough 9/18 (50%)
Somerville 21/26 (81%)

25 July 2014
09:30

Report
New Zealand
50 – 47
Malawi

SECC Precinct
Umpires:
Sharon Kelly (AUS)
Terrence Peart (JAM)
Reserve umpire:
Tracy Smith (ENG)
Brown 8/14 (57%)
Latu 30/31 (97%)
Tutaia 12/15 (80%)

Kumwenda 38/39 (97%)
Ngwira 0/1 (0%)
Simtowe 9/11 (82%)

26 July 2014
17:00

Report
Saint Lucia
28 – 69
Malawi

SECC Precinct
Umpires:
Michelle Phippard (AUS)
Marie-Louw Van Der Merve (RSA)
Reserve umpire:
Yvonne Morgan (NZL)
Altifois-Fenelon 2/3 (67%)
Hippolyte 9/13 (69%)
Laurencin 1/5 (20%)
Maxwell 16/28 (57%)

Kumwenda 42/49 (86%)
Mvula 12/14 (86%)
Simtowe 15/19 (79%)

28 July 2014
19:00

Report
Jamaica
81 – 50
Malawi

SECC Precinct
Umpires:
Michelle Phippard (AUS)
Joshua Bowring (AUS)
Reserve umpire:
Jonathan Bredin (NZL)
Aiken 24/27 (89%)
Harwood 2/4 (50%)
Reid 55/59 (93%)

Chimaliro 3/7 (43%)
Kumwenda 31/33 (94%)
Simtowe 16/25 (64%)

29 July 2014
19:00

Report
Malawi
62 – 35
Scotland

SECC Precinct
Umpires:
Jonathan Bredin (NZL)
Rachael Ayre (AUS)
Reserve umpire:
Michelle Phippard (AUS)
Kumwenda 40/18 (222%)
Simtowe 22/25 (88%)

Gallagher 13/16 (81%)
MacDonald 11/14 (79%)
Pettitt 6/10 (60%)
Sole 5/8 (63%)

5th place match

1 August 2014
11:45

Report
Malawi
53 – 45
South Africa

SECC Precinct
Umpires:
Ian Fuller (ENG)
Joshua Bowring (AUS)
Reserve umpire:
Jonathan Bredin (NZL)
Kumwenda 35/39 (90%)
Simtowe 18/20 (90%)

Bootha 19/23 (83%)
Holtzhausen 15/15 (100%)
Potgieter 22/31 (71%)

== Swimming ==
Women

| Athlete | Event | Heat | | Semifinal | | Final | |
| Athlete | Event | Time | Rank | Time | Rank | Time | Rank |
|---|---|---|---|---|---|---|---|
| Kirstie Millar | 50 m freestyle | 29.50 | 52 | Did not advance | | | |
| Joyce Tafatatha | 50 m freestyle | 28.05 | 37 | Did not advance | | | |
| Kirstie Millar | 100 m freestyle | 1:06.03 | 41 | Did not advance | | | |
| Joyce Tafatatha | 50 m backstroke | 31.90 | 18 | Did not advance | | | |
| Joyce Tafatatha | 50 m butterfly | 29.59 | 30 | Did not advance | | | |

== Table Tennis ==
Singles

| Athlete | Event | Group stage | | | Round of 64 | Round of 32 | Round of 16 | Quarterfinals | Semifinals | Final | Rank |
| Athlete | Event | Opposition Result | Opposition Result | Rank | Opposition Result | Opposition Result | Opposition Result | Opposition Result | Opposition Result | Opposition Result | Rank |
|---|---|---|---|---|---|---|---|---|---|---|---|
| Stewart Hara | Men's Singles | Ng'andu (ZAM); L 0 - 4 | Jenkins (WAL); L 1 - 4 | 3 | Did not advance | | | | | | |
| Abel Somba | Men's Singles | Shong (SVG); W 4 - 0 | Yogarajah (MRI); L 1 - 4 | 2 | Did not advance | | | | | | |

Doubles

| Athlete | Event | Round of 64 | Round of 32 | Round of 16 | Quarterfinals | Semifinals | Final | Rank |
| Athlete | Event | Opposition Result | Opposition Result | Opposition Result | Opposition Result | Opposition Result | Opposition Result | Rank |
|---|---|---|---|---|---|---|---|---|
| Stewart Hara; Abel Somba | Men's Doubles | Vanuatu; W 3 - 0 | Nigeria; L 0 - 3 | Did not advance | | | | |

== Weightlifting ==
Men

| Athlete | Event | Snatch | | Clean & jerk | | Total | Rank |
| Athlete | Event | Result | Rank | Result | Rank | Total | Rank |
|---|---|---|---|---|---|---|---|
| Brito Mota | −56 kg | 74 | 13 | 90 | 10 | 164 | 10 |
| John Phiri | −69 kg | 80 | 17 | 107 | 16 | 187 | 16 |
