= 2018 Taini Jamison Trophy Series =

International netball series

Tournament details
- Host country: New Zealand
- City: Auckland
- Venue: North Shore Events Centre
- Dates: 21–24 March 2018
- Teams: 4
- TV partner(s): Sky Sport (New Zealand); Kwesé Sports

Final positions
- Champions: Jamaica (1st title)
- Runners-up: New Zealand
- Third place: Malawi

Tournament statistics
- Matches played: 8
- Top scorer(s): Mwai Kumwenda; 171/200 (86%)

The 2018 Taini Jamison Trophy Series was the tenth Taini Jamison Trophy series. New Zealand hosted Fiji, Jamaica and Malawi in a full tournament, played in March 2018, at the North Shore Events Centre. It was effectively a warm-up tournament, ahead of the 2018 Commonwealth Games. The series was broadcast live on Sky Sport in New Zealand and on Kwesé Sports in Sub-Saharan Africa. It was also streamed live via Facebook. With a team featuring Jhaniele Fowler Reid, Romelda Aiken and Shamera Sterling, Jamaica won their first Taini Jamison Trophy. During the tournament, they twice defeated New Zealand, once in the preliminary rounds and again in the final. Despite winning the series, Netball New Zealand refused to allow Jamaica to take the actual trophy home, stating that "for insurance purposes... we can't really have it go offshore".

== Squads ==
Participating teams and rosters
Fiji	Jamaica	Malawi	New Zealand
Nina Cirikisuva; Alisi Galo; Episake Kahatoka; Alisi Naqiri; Alesi Paul; Lusiani Rokoura (c); Afa Rusivakula; Maliana Rusivakula; Verenaisi Sawana; Laisani Waqa; Alanieta Waqainabete; Merelita Waqanidrola	Romelda Aiken; Shanice Beckford; Nicole Dixon; Stacian Facey; Jhaniele Fowler Reid; Rebekah Robinson; Shamera Sterling; Adean Thomas; Paula Thompson; Jodi-Ann Ward; Khadijah Williams; Vangelee Williams	Jane Chimaliro; Martha Dambo; Thandie Galleta; Joanna Kachilika (c); Bridget Kumwenda; Mwai Kumwenda; Takondwa Lwazi; Caroline Mtukule; Joyce Mvula; Loreen Ngwira; Sindi Simtowe; Towera Vinkhumbo	Kayla Cullen; Ameliaranne Ekenasio; Temalisi Fakahokotau; Maria Folau (vc); Katrina Grant (c); Kelly Jury; Grace Kara; Claire Kersten; Bailey Mes; Shannon Saunders; Te Paea Selby-Rickit; Samantha Sinclair; Michaela Sokolich-Beatson; Maia Wilson
Coach: Vicki Wilson	Co-Head Coach: Sasher-Gaye Henry	Coach: Whyte Mulilima	Coach: Janine Southby
Assistant coach:	Co-Head Coach: Marvette Anderson	Assistant coach: Griffin Saenda	Assistant coach: Yvette McCausland-Durie

== Debuts and milestones ==
- Michaela Sokolich-Beatson made her senior debut for New Zealand in the match against Malawi.
- Shannon Francois made her 50th senior appearance for New Zealand in the first match against Jamaica.

== Preliminary Rounds ==
=== Round 1 ===
Wed, 21 March 2018; 6.10pm (NZT)	Stats	Jamaica	83–38	Fiji
Wed, 21 March 2018; 6.10pm (NZT)	Stats	Scoring by quarter: 18–13, 33–22, 55–35, 83–38
Wed, 21 March 2018; 6.10pm (NZT)	Stats	Jhaniele Fowler Reid 38/41 (93%); Romelda Aiken 22/30 (73%); Rebekah Robinson 16/27 (59%); Shanice Beckford 7/9 (78%)		Afa Rusivakula 16/18 (89%); Maliana Rusivakula 11/12 (92%); Laisani Waqa 8/11 (73%); Alesi Paul 3/5 (60%)

Wed, 21 March 2018; 8.10pm (NZT)	Stats	New Zealand	75–42	Malawi
Wed, 21 March 2018; 8.10pm (NZT)	Stats	Scoring by quarter: 18–6, 36–17, 56–29, 75–42
Wed, 21 March 2018; 8.10pm (NZT)	Stats	Te Paea Selby-Rickit 36/44 (82%); Maria Folau 15/17 (88%); Ameliaranne Ekenasio 12/15 (80%); Bailey Mes 12/18 (67%)		Mwai Kumwenda 36/44 (82%); Jane Chimaliro 3/4 (75%); Sindi Simtowe 3/5 (60%); Joyce Mvula 0/1 (0%)

=== Round 2 ===
Thurs, 22 March 2018; 6.10pm (NZT)	Stats	Malawi	67–52	Fiji
Thurs, 22 March 2018; 6.10pm (NZT)	Stats	Scoring by quarter: 20–11, 40–21, 49–36, 67–52
Thurs, 22 March 2018; 6.10pm (NZT)	Stats	Mwai Kumwenda 54/63 (86%); Sindi Simtowe 12/14 (86%); Joyce Mvula 1/1 (100%)		Afa Rusivakula 32/35 (91%); Alesi Paul 13/17 (76%); Maliana Rusivakula 7/8 (88%); Laisani Waqa 0/1 (0%)

Thurs, 22 March 2018; 8.10pm (NZT)	Stats	New Zealand	51–59	Jamaica
Thurs, 22 March 2018; 8.10pm (NZT)	Stats	Scoring by quarter: 13–13, 27–30, 41–44, 51–59
Thurs, 22 March 2018; 8.10pm (NZT)	Stats	Te Paea Selby-Rickit 32/34 (94%); Bailey Mes 15/24 (63%); Ameliaranne Ekenasio 4/6 (67%)		Jhaniele Fowler Reid 38/42 (90%); Romelda Aiken 11/12 (92%); Shanice Beckford 10/12 (83%)

=== Round 3 ===
Fri, 23 March 2018; 6.10pm (NZT)	Stats	Jamaica	66–55	Malawi
Fri, 23 March 2018; 6.10pm (NZT)	Stats	Scoring by quarter: 15–13, 30–26, 47–44, 66–55
Fri, 23 March 2018; 6.10pm (NZT)	Stats	Romelda Aiken 29/35 (83%); Rebekah Robinson 22/29 (76%); Jhaniele Fowler Reid 12/14 (86%); Shimona Nelson 3/3 (100%)		Mwai Kumwenda 35/41 (85%); Joyce Mvula 11/11 (100%); Sindi Simtowe 9/9 (100%)

Fri, 23 March 2018; 8.10pm (NZT)	Stats	New Zealand	88–27	Fiji
Fri, 23 March 2018; 8.10pm (NZT)	Stats	Scoring by quarter: 21–8, 41–16, 63–22, 88–27
Fri, 23 March 2018; 8.10pm (NZT)	Stats	Ameliaranne Ekenasio 56/70 (80%); Bailey Mes 17/21 (81%); Maria Folau 15/19 (79%)		Maliana Rusivakula 16/22 (73%); Laisani Waqa 6/9 (67%); Alesi Paul 5/8 (63%)

=== Table ===
Pos	Team	P	W	D	L	GF	GA	Pts
1	Jamaica	3	3	0	0	208	144	6
2	New Zealand	3	2	0	1	214	128	4
3	Malawi	3	1	0	2	164	193	2
4	Fiji	3	0	0	3	117	238	0

Qualified for the Final
Qualified for the Third place play-off

== 1st/4th Play offs ==
=== Third place play-off ===
Sat, 24 March 2018; 2.10pm (NZT)	Malawi	78–46	Fiji
Sat, 24 March 2018; 2.10pm (NZT)	Scoring by quarter: 21–8, 40–21, 56–32, 78–46
Sat, 24 March 2018; 2.10pm (NZT)	Mwai Kumwenda 46/52 (88%); Sindi Simtowe 14/15 (93%); Jane Chimaliro 12/12 (100%); Joyce Mvula 6/9 (67%)		Maliana Rusivakula 16/24 (67%); Laisani Waqa 16/19 (84%); Afa Rusivakula 11/12 (92%); Alesi Paul 3/5 (60%)

=== Final ===
Sat, 24 March 2018; 4.10pm (NZT)	Stats	New Zealand	53–59	Jamaica
Sat, 24 March 2018; 4.10pm (NZT)	Stats	Scoring by quarter: 9–13, 23–28, 39–44, 53–59
Sat, 24 March 2018; 4.10pm (NZT)	Stats	Maria Folau 22/26 (85%); Ameliaranne Ekenasio 15/19 (79%); Te Paea Selby-Rickit 14/17 (82%); Bailey Mes 2/5 (40%)		Jhaniele Fowler Reid 51/56 (91%); Shanice Beckford 8/12 (67%)

== Final standings ==
Rank	Team
1st	Jamaica
2nd	New Zealand
3rd	Malawi
4th	Fiji
