= Malawi at the 2022 Commonwealth Games =

- Flag of Malawi
- CG code: MAW
- CGA: Malawi Olympic Committee
- Website: moc.org.mw

in Birmingham, England 28 July 2022 – 8 August 2022
- Competitors: 22 (6 men and 16 women) in 5 sports
- Medals: Gold 0 Silver 0 Bronze 0 Total 0

Commonwealth Games appearances (overview)
- 1970; 1974; 1978; 1982; 1986; 1990; 1994; 1998; 2002; 2006; 2010; 2014; 2018; 2022; 2026; 2030

Other related appearances
- Rhodesia and Nyasaland (1962)

Malawi competed at the 2022 Commonwealth Games at Birmingham, England from 28 July to 8 August 2022. Having made its Games debut in 1970, it was Malawi's fourteenth appearance to date.

== Competitors ==
Malawi's team consisted of 22 athletes competing in five sports.

The following is the list of number of competitors participating at the Games per sport/discipline.

| Sport | Men | Women | Total |
|---|---|---|---|
| Athletics | 2 | 1 | 3 |
| Boxing | 2 | 1 | 3 |
| Judo | 1 | 1 | 2 |
| Netball | —N/a | 12 | 12 |
| Swimming | 1 | 1 | 2 |
| Total | 6 | 16 | 22 |

== Athletics ==
Men
Track and road events

| Athlete | Event | Heat | | Semifinal | | Final | |
| Athlete | Event | Result | Rank | Result | Rank | Result | Rank |
|---|---|---|---|---|---|---|---|
| Stern Liffa | 100 m | 10.49 | 3 | Did not advance | | | |
| Stern Liffa | 200 m | 21.43 | 5 | Did not advance | | | |
| Farook Mponda | 200 m | 22.61 | 7 | Did not advance | | | |
| Farook Mponda | 400 m | 49.12 | 7 | Did not advance | | | |

Women
Track and road events

| Athlete | Event | Heat | | Semifinal | | Final | |
| Athlete | Event | Result | Rank | Result | Rank | Result | Rank |
|---|---|---|---|---|---|---|---|
| Asimenye Simwaka | 200 m | 23.28 | 3 Q | 23.59 | 5 | Did not advance | |
| Asimenye Simwaka | 400 m | 52.19 | 3 Q | 51.70 | 2 Q | 51.55 | 6 |

== Boxing ==
| Athlete | Event | Round of 32 | Round of 16 | Quarterfinals | Semifinals | Final | |
| Athlete | Event | Opposition Result | Opposition Result | Opposition Result | Opposition Result | Opposition Result | Rank |
|---|---|---|---|---|---|---|---|
| Elias Bonzo | Men's Light welterweight | Ume (PNG); L 1 - 4 | Did not advance | | | | |
| Luwis Mbewe | Men's Welterweight | Bye | Deen Kargbo (SLE); W 4 - 1 | Croft (WAL); L RSC | Did not advance | | |
| Natasha Maya | Women's Featherweight | —N/a | Kenosi (BOT); L 0 - 5 | Did not advance | | | |

== Judo ==
A squad of two judoka was entered as of 8 July 2022.

| Athlete | Event | Round of 16 | Quarterfinals | Semifinals | Repechage | Final/BM | |
| Athlete | Event | Opposition Result | Opposition Result | Opposition Result | Opposition Result | Opposition Result | Rank |
|---|---|---|---|---|---|---|---|
| Austin Chikwapula | Men's -66 kg | Short (SCO); L 00 - 10 | Did not advance | | | | 9 |
| Harriet Boniface | Women's -48 kg | Bye | Likmabam (IND); L 00 - 10 | Did not advance | Tari (VAN); W 10 - 00 | Platten (ENG); L 00 - 10 | 5 |

== Netball ==
By virtue of its position in the World Netball Rankings (as of 28 July 2021), Malawi qualified for the tournament.

Partial fixtures were announced in November 2021, then updated with the remaining qualifiers in March 2022.

Summary

| Team | Event | Group stage | | | | | | Semifinal | Final / BM / Cl. | |
| Team | Event | Opposition Result | Opposition Result | Opposition Result | Opposition Result | Opposition Result | Rank | Opposition Result | Opposition Result | Rank |
|---|---|---|---|---|---|---|---|---|---|---|
| Malawi women | Women's tournament | England; L 41 - 66 | Northern Ireland; W 54 - 41 | New Zealand; L 50 - 69 | Trinidad and Tobago; W 70 - 30 | Uganda; L 43 - 56 | 4 | Did not advance | Seventh place match Wales; W 62 - 56 | 7 |

Roster

- Joyce Mvula
- Jane Chimaliro
- Sindi Simtowe
- Takondwa Lwazi
- Thandi Galeta
- Bridget Kumwenda
- Shira Dimba
- Martha Dambo
- Caroline Mtukule
- Towera Vinkhumbo
- Loreen Ngwira
- Jasinta Kumwenda

Group play

| Pos | Team | Pld | W | D | L | GF | GA | GD | Pts | Qualification |
|---|---|---|---|---|---|---|---|---|---|---|
| 1 | England (H) | 5 | 5 | 0 | 0 | 321 | 169 | +152 | 10 | Semi-finals |
| 2 | New Zealand | 5 | 4 | 0 | 1 | 325 | 188 | +137 | 8 | Semi-finals |
| 3 | Uganda | 5 | 3 | 0 | 2 | 256 | 206 | +50 | 6 | Classification matches |
| 4 | Malawi | 5 | 2 | 0 | 3 | 258 | 262 | −4 | 4 | Classification matches |
| 5 | Northern Ireland | 5 | 1 | 0 | 4 | 155 | 299 | −144 | 2 | Classification matches |
| 6 | Trinidad and Tobago | 5 | 0 | 0 | 5 | 136 | 327 | −191 | 0 | Classification matches |

Source: Birmingham 2022
(H) Hosts

| 30 July 2022; 14:00 | Report | England | 66–41 | Malawi | National Exhibition Centre; Umpires: Tara Warner; Gareth Fowler |
| 30 July 2022; 14:00 | Report | Cardwell 31/33 (94%); Harten 21/25 (84%); Housby 14/18 (78%) | | Chimaliro 4/5 (80%); Kumwenda 18/21 (86%); Mvula 19/22 (86%) | National Exhibition Centre; Umpires: Tara Warner; Gareth Fowler |

| 31 July 2022; 12:00 | Report | Malawi | 54–41 | Northern Ireland | National Exhibition Centre; Umpires: Angela Armstrong-Lush; Tracy-Ann Griffiths |
| 31 July 2022; 12:00 | Report | Chimaliro 4/4 (100%); Kumwenda 29/32 (91%); Mvula 15/19 (79%); Simtowe 6/6 (100%) | | Bowman 1/3 (33%); Crosbie 18/22 (82%); Magee 22/27 (81%) | National Exhibition Centre; Umpires: Angela Armstrong-Lush; Tracy-Ann Griffiths |

| 1 August 2022; 20:00 | Report | New Zealand | 69–50 | Malawi | National Exhibition Centre; Umpires: Gary Burgess; Joshua Bowring |
| 1 August 2022; 20:00 | Report | Nweke 52/55 (95%); Selby-Rickit 13/15 (87%); Wilson 4/5 (80%) | | Chimaliro 5/6 (83%); Kumwenda 27/31 (87%); Mvula 14/17 (82%); Simtowe 4/4 (100%) | National Exhibition Centre; Umpires: Gary Burgess; Joshua Bowring |

| 3 August 2022; 18:00 | Report | Malawi | 70–30 | Trinidad and Tobago | National Exhibition Centre; Umpires: Louise Travis; Anso Kemp |
| 3 August 2022; 18:00 | Report | Chimaliro 16/16 (100%); Kumwenda 27/28 (96%); Mvula 22/26 (85%); Simtowe 5/6 (83%) | | Cooper 2/4 (50%); Hollingsworth 5/9 (56%); Noel 23/26 (88%) | National Exhibition Centre; Umpires: Louise Travis; Anso Kemp |

| 4 August 2022; 16:00 | Report | Malawi | 43–56 | Uganda | National Exhibition Centre; Umpires: Tara Warner; Gary Burgess |
| 4 August 2022; 16:00 | Report | Chimaliro 14/15 (93%); Kumwenda 22/23 (96%); Mvula 4/6 (67%); Simtowe 3/3 (100%) | | Cholhok 31/33 (94%); Eyaru 22/23 (96%); Proscovia 3/3 (100%) | National Exhibition Centre; Umpires: Tara Warner; Gary Burgess |

Seventh place match

| 5 August 2022; 14:30 | Report | Wales | 56–62 | Malawi | National Exhibition Centre; Umpires: Ken Metekingi; Kate Wright |
| 5 August 2022; 14:30 | Report | Creak 8/10 (80%); Roberts 1/2 (50%); Rowe 47/49 (96%) | | Chimaliro 3/4 (75%); Kumwenda 49/50 (98%); Simtowe 10/11 (91%) | National Exhibition Centre; Umpires: Ken Metekingi; Kate Wright |

== Swimming ==
Men

| Athlete | Event | Heat | | Semifinal | | Final | |
| Athlete | Event | Time | Rank | Time | Rank | Time | Rank |
|---|---|---|---|---|---|---|---|
| Tsinde Kumbatira | 50 m freestyle | 27.84 | 69 | Did not advance | | | |
| Tsinde Kumbatira | 50 m butterfly | 31.04 | 54 | Did not advance | | | |

Women

| Athlete | Event | Heat | | Semifinal | | Final | |
| Athlete | Event | Time | Rank | Time | Rank | Time | Rank |
|---|---|---|---|---|---|---|---|
| Jessica Makwenda | 50 m freestyle | Disqualified | | Did not advance | | | |
| Jessica Makwenda | 50 m butterfly | 34.75 | 52 | Did not advance | | | |
