= Malawi at the 2010 Commonwealth Games =

Sporting event delegation

- Flag of Malawi
- CGF code: MAW
- CGA: Malawi Olympic Committee
- Website: moc.org.mw

in Delhi, India 3 October 2010 – 14 October 2010
- Flag bearer: Mary Maya
- Medals: Gold 0 Silver 0 Bronze 0 Total 0

Commonwealth Games appearances (overview)
- 1970; 1974; 1978; 1982; 1986; 1990; 1994; 1998; 2002; 2006; 2010; 2014; 2018; 2022; 2026; 2030

Other related appearances
- Rhodesia and Nyasaland (1962)

Malawi competed in the 2010 Commonwealth Games held in Delhi, India, from 3 to 14 October 2010.

== Netball ==
Malawi Women's Netball squad comprised:

- Joanna Kachilika
- Peace Kaluwa
- Mwayi Kumwenda
- Linda Magombo
- Slyvia Malenga
- Beatrice Mpinganjira
- Caroline Mtukule
- Grace Mwafulirwa
- Ester Nkhoma
- Sindi Simtowe
- Towera Vinkhumbo
- Mary Waya

=== Preliminary round ===
==== Pool A ====
Pos	Team	Pld	W	D	L	GF	GA	G%	Pts
1	Australia	5	5	0	0	385	172	223.8	10
2	Jamaica	5	4	0	1	362	217	166.8	8
3	Malawi	5	3	0	2	293	262	111.8	6
4	Trinidad and Tobago	5	2	0	3	249	275	90.5	4
5	Samoa	5	1	0	4	246	291	84.5	2
6	India	5	0	0	4	123	441	27.9	0

- Goal percentage (G%) = 100 × GF/GA. Accurate to one decimal place.
- Highlighted teams advanced to the medal playoffs; other teams contested classification matches.

Tuesday 5 October; 11:30 (IST)	Report	Jamaica	71 – 48	Malawi	Thyagaraj Sports Complex; Umpires: Annie Kloppers, Joel Young Strong; Reserve umpire: Rachael Ayre
Tuesday 5 October; 11:30 (IST)	Report	R. Aiken 10/11 (91%); Forbes 9/10 (90%); Fowler 47/53 (89%); Griffiths 4/5 (80%)		Kumwenda 31/38 (82%); Waya 17/23 (74%)	Thyagaraj Sports Complex; Umpires: Annie Kloppers, Joel Young Strong; Reserve umpire: Rachael Ayre

Wednesday 6 October; 11:30 (IST)	Report	Malawi	82 – 26	India	Thyagaraj Sports Complex; Umpires: Gary Burgess, Bobbi Brown; Reserve umpire: Dalton Hinds
Wednesday 6 October; 11:30 (IST)	Report	Kumwenda 47/53 (89%); Magombo 12/15 (80%); Simtowe 6/7 (86%); Waya 17/21 (81%)		Bajaj 4/4 (100%); H. Kaur 5/9 (56%); K. Kaur 17/19 (89%)	Thyagaraj Sports Complex; Umpires: Gary Burgess, Bobbi Brown; Reserve umpire: Dalton Hinds

Friday 8 October; 15:00 (IST)	Report	Malawi	35 – 74	Australia	Thyagaraj Sports Complex; Umpires: Annie Kloppers, Jonathan Bredin; Reserve umpire: Dalton Hinds
Friday 8 October; 15:00 (IST)	Report	Kumwenda 21/26 (81%); Simtowe 4/5 (80%); Waya 10/18 (56%)		Cox 38/43 (88%); Pratley 36/39 (92%)	Thyagaraj Sports Complex; Umpires: Annie Kloppers, Jonathan Bredin; Reserve umpire: Dalton Hinds

Saturday 9 October; 11:30 (IST)	Report	Trinidad and Tobago	50 – 61	Malawi	Thyagaraj Sports Complex; Umpires: Amanda Nottingham, Gary Burgess; Reserve umpire: Annie Kloppers
Saturday 9 October; 11:30 (IST)	Report	Barker 7/7 (100%); Cooper 17/19 (89%); Wilson 26/30 (87%)		Kumwenda 37/42 (88%); Waya 24/27 (89%)	Thyagaraj Sports Complex; Umpires: Amanda Nottingham, Gary Burgess; Reserve umpire: Annie Kloppers

Sunday 10 October; 16:00 (IST)	Report	Malawi	67 – 41	Samoa	Thyagaraj Sports Complex; Umpires: Gary Burgess, Sylvester Campbell; Reserve umpire: Paula Ferguson
Sunday 10 October; 16:00 (IST)	Report	Kumwenda 52/55 (95%); Simtowe 4/5 (80%); Waya 11/13 (85%)		Chang 4/6 (67%); Faasavalu 8/13 (62%); Fuimaono 17/19 (89%); Langi 12/14 (86%)	Thyagaraj Sports Complex; Umpires: Gary Burgess, Sylvester Campbell; Reserve umpire: Paula Ferguson
