= 2018 Fast5 Netball World Series =

International Fast5 tournament hosted by Australia

Tournament details
- Host country: Australia
- City: Melbourne
- Venue: Melbourne Arena
- Dates: 27–28 October 2018
- Teams: 6
- TV partner(s): 9Gem (Australia); Sky Sports (UK/Ireland); Sky Sport (New Zealand); SuperSport (South Africa); SportsMax (Caribbean)

Final positions
- Champions: New Zealand (7th title)
- Runners-up: Jamaica
- Third place: Australia

Tournament statistics
- Matches played: 18
- Top scorer(s): Romelda Aiken

The 2018 Fast5 Netball World Series was the 9th Fast5 Netball World Series. Australia hosted England, Jamaica, Malawi, New Zealand and South Africa in a series, played in October 2018, at the Melbourne Arena. With a team coached by Debbie Fuller and captained by Sulu Fitzpatrick, New Zealand won the series for the seventh time after defeating Jamaica 34–33 in the final. Australia finished third, overcoming Malawi 38–15 in a playoff. The series was broadcast live on 9Gem in Australia, on Sky Sports in the United Kingdom and Ireland, on Sky Sport in New Zealand, on SuperSport (South Africa) and on SportsMax in the Caribbean.

== Squads ==
Participating teams and rosters
Australia	England	Jamaica	Malawi	New Zealand	South Africa
Jessica Anstiss; Kiera Austin; Sophie Garbin; Matilda Garrett; Kim Jenner; Sarah Klau; Samantha Poolman (c); Maddy Proud; Laura Scherian; Kaylia Stanton	Eleanor Cardwell; Amy Carter; Ella Clark; Sasha Corbin; Emma Dovey; George Fisher; Jodie Gibson; Layla Guscoth; Jo Harten (c); Natalie Panagarry	Romelda Aiken; Shanice Beckford; Stacian Facey; Thistina Harwood; Shimona Nelson; Shamera Sterling; Adean Thomas; Jodi-Ann Ward; Khadijah Williams; Vangelee Williams	Jane Chimaliro; Martha Dambo; Thandie Galleta; Alinafe Kamwala; Joanna Kachilika; Takondwa Lwazi; Jessia Mazengera; Caroline Mtukule; Joyce Mvula; Loreen Ngwira; Towera Vinkhumbo	Karin Burger; Aliyah Dunn; Ameliaranne Ekenasio; Monica Falkner; Sulu Fitzpatrick (c); Holly Fowler; Claire Kersten; Bailey Mes; Kimiora Poi; Whitney Souness	Sigrid Burger; Khanyisa Chawane; Zandre Erasmus; Danelle Lochner; Khomotso Mamburu; Tshina Mdau; Monique Reyneke; Renske Stoltz; Shadine van der Merwe (c); Zanele Vimbela
Head Coach: Stacey Marinkovich	Head Coach: Karen Atkinson	Head Coach:	Head Coach:	Head Coach: Debbie Fuller	Head Coach: Dorette Badenhorst
Assistant coach:	Assistant coach: Karen Greig	Assistant coach:	Assistant coach:	Assistant coach:	Assistant coach:

== Round robin stage ==
=== Round 1 ===
27 October 2018	Australia	29–15	Malawi
13:45 (AEDST)		Stats

27 October 2018	Jamaica	47–27	South Africa
14:30 AEDST		Stats

27 October 2018	New Zealand	32–19	England
15:15 AEDST		Stats

=== Round 2 ===
27 October 2018	Australia	37–22	Jamaica
16:00 AEDST		Stats

27 October 2018	Malawi	27–26	England
13:45 (AEDST)		Stats

27 October 2018	New Zealand	39–36	South Africa
17:30 AEDST		Stats

=== Round 3 ===
27 October 2018	Jamaica	35–30	Malawi
18:15 AEDST		Stats

27 October 2018	South Africa	28–25	England
19:00 AEDST		Stats

27 October 2018	Australia	32–34	New Zealand
19:45 AEDST		Stats

=== Round 4 ===
28 October 2018	Malawi	33-32	South Africa
12:15 AEDST		Stats

28 October 2018	Australia	28–29	England
13:00 AEDST		Stats

28 October 2018	Jamaica	23–22	New Zealand
13:45 AEDST		Stats

=== Round 5 ===
28 October 2018	Australia	50–20	South Africa
14:30 AEDST		Stats

28 October 2018	New Zealand	36–16	Malawi
15:15 AEDST		Stats

28 October 2018	Jamaica	42–37	England
16:00 AEDST		Stats

=== Ladder ===
Pos	Team	P	W	D	L	GF	GA	%	Pts
1	New Zealand	5	4	0	1	163	126	129.4	8
2	Jamaica	5	4	0	1	169	153	110.5	8
3	Australia	5	3	0	2	176	120	146.7	6
4	Malawi	5	2	0	3	121	158	76.6	4
5	England	5	1	0	4	136	157	86.6	2
6	South Africa	5	1	0	4	143	194	73.7	2

Qualified for the final
Qualified for 3rd/4th place match
Qualified for 5th/6th place match

== Playoffs ==
=== 5th v 6th Playoff ===
28 October 2018	England	35–33	South Africa
17:25 AEDST		Stats

=== 3rd v 4th Playoff ===
28 October 2018	Australia	38–15	Malawi
18:05 AEDST		Stats

=== Final ===
28 October 2018	New Zealand	34–33	Jamaica
19:00 AEDST		Stats

== Award winners ==
Award	Winner	Team
Player of the Series	Shamera Sterling	Jamaica

== Top scorers ==
Player	Team	1pt goals	2pt goals	3pt goals
Romelda Aiken	Jamaica	63/65 (97%)	3/13 (23%)	0/4 (0%)
Joyce Mvula	Malawi	48/56 (86%)	4/15 (27%)	1/8 (13%)
Kaylia Stanton	Australia	28/33 (85%)	17/41 (41%)	3/7 (43%)

== Final Placings ==
Rank	Team
1st place, gold medalist(s)	New Zealand
2nd place, silver medalist(s)	Jamaica
3rd place, bronze medalist(s)	Australia
4	Malawi
5	England
6	South Africa
