= 2017 Fast5 Netball World Series =

International Fast5 tournament hosted by Australia

Tournament details
- Host country: Australia
- City: Melbourne
- Venue: Hisense Arena
- Dates: 28–29 October 2017
- Teams: 6
- TV partner(s): 9Gem (Australia); Sky Sports (UK/Ireland); SuperSport (South Africa)

Final positions
- Champions: England (2nd title)
- Runners-up: Jamaica
- Third place: Australia

Tournament statistics
- Matches played: 18
- Top scorer(s): Jhaniele Fowler-Reid

The 2017 Fast5 Netball World Series was the 8th Fast5 Netball World Series. Australia hosted England, Jamaica, Malawi, New Zealand and South Africa in a series, played in October 2017, at Melbourne's Hisense Arena. With a team coached by Tracey Neville and captained by Ama Agbeze, England won the series for a second time. In the final they defeated Jamaica 34–29. Australia finished third, overcoming New Zealand 34–15 playoff. The series was broadcast live on 9Gem in Australia, on Sky Sports in the United Kingdom and Ireland and on SuperSport (South Africa).

== Squads ==
Participating teams and rosters
Australia	England	Jamaica	Malawi	New Zealand	South Africa
Ashleigh Brazill; Paige Hadley; Sarah Klau; Kate Moloney (c); Tegan Philip; Samantha Poolman; Kate Shimmin; Kaylia Stanton; Gretel Tippett; Maddy Turner	Ama Agbeze (c); Beth Cobden; Rachel Dunn; Serena Guthrie; Joanne Harten (vc); Natalie Haythornthwaite; Helen Housby; Gabby Marshall; Geva Mentor; Natalie Panagarry	Shanice Beckford; Stacian Facey; Jhaniele Fowler-Reid (c); Malysha Kelly; Shimona Nelson; Rebekah Robinson; Adean Thomas; Paula Thompson; Khadijah Williams; Vangelee Williams	Jane Chimaliro; Martha Dambo; Thandie Galleta; Alinafe Kamwala; Joanna Kachilika (c); Takondwa Lwazi; Jessia Mazengera; Caroline Mtukule; Joyce Mvula; Loreen Ngwira	Kayla Cullen; Ameliaranne Ekenasio; Temalisi Fakahokotau; Monica Falkner; Jamie Hume; Erikana Pedersen; Storm Purvis (c); Whitney Souness; Zoe Walker; Maia Wilson	Charmaine Baard; Lauren-Lee Christians (c); Rome Dreyer; Maryka Holtzhausen; Jessica Khomo; Phumza Maweni; Fikile Mkhuzangwe; Zanne-Marie Pienaar; Deancke Pohde; Renske Stoltz
Head Coach: Stacey Marinkovich	Head Coach: Tracey Neville	Co-Head Coach: Sasher-Gaye Henry	Head Coach:	Head Coach: Kiri Wills	Head Coach: Elsjé Jordaan
Assistant coach: Megan Anderson; Rob Wright	Assistant coach: Tania Obst	Co-Head Coach: Marvette Anderson	Assistant coach:	Assistant coach:	Assistant coach:

== Round robin stage ==
=== Round 1 ===
28 October 2017	Australia	34–21	Malawi
13:45 (AEDST)		Report

28 October 2017	Jamaica	37–29	South Africa
14:30 (AEDST)		Report

28 October 2017	England	37–30	New Zealand
15:15 (AEDST)		Report

=== Round 2 ===
28 October 2017	Australia	23–26	Jamaica
16:00 AEDST		Report

28 October 2017	England	43–15	Malawi
16:45 AEDST		Report

28 October 2017	New Zealand	40–26	South Africa
17:30 AEDST		Report

=== Round 3 ===
28 October 2017	Jamaica	31–24	Malawi
18:15 AEDST		Report

28 October 2017	England	43–33	South Africa
19:00 AEDST		Report

28 October 2017	Australia	40–30	New Zealand
19:45 AEDST		Report

=== Round 4 ===
29 October 2017	South Africa	28–26	Malawi
12:15 AEDST		Report

29 October 2017	Australia	19–28	England
13:00 AEDST		Report

29 October 2017	Jamaica	30–23	New Zealand
13:45 AEDST		Report

=== Round 5 ===
29 October 2017	Australia	31–18	South Africa
14:30 AEDST		Report

29 October 2017	New Zealand	29–27	Malawi
15:15 AEDST		Report

29 October 2017	Jamaica	47–38	England
16:00 AEDST		Report

=== Ladder ===
Pos	Team	P	W	D	L	GF	GA	%	Pts
1	Jamaica	5	5	0	0	171	137	124.8	10
2	England	5	4	0	1	189	144	131.3	8
3	Australia	5	3	0	2	147	123	119.5	6
4	New Zealand	5	2	0	3	152	160	95	4
5	South Africa	5	1	0	4	134	177	75.7	2
6	Malawi	5	0	0	5	113	165	68.5	0

Qualified for the final
Qualified for 3rd/4th place match
Qualified for 5th/6th place match

== Playoffs ==
=== 5th v 6th Playoff ===
29 October 2017	South Africa	28–17	Malawi
17:25 AEDST

=== 3rd v 4th Playoff ===
29 October 2017	Australia	34–15	New Zealand
18:35 AEDST

=== Final ===
29 October 2017	England	34–29	Jamaica
19:25 AEDST

== Award winners ==
Award	Winner	Team
Player of the Series	Serena Guthrie	England

== Top scorers ==
Player	Team	1pt goals	2pt goals	3pt goals
Jhaniele Fowler-Reid	Jamaica	64/74 (86%)	16/38 (42%)	0/11 (0%)
Joyce Mvula	Malawi	44/53 (83%)	5/23 (22%)	0/12 (0%)
Ameliaranne Ekenasio	New Zealand	24/27 (89%)	19/37 (51%)	6/26 (23%)

== Final Placings ==
Rank	Team
1st place, gold medalist(s)	England
2nd place, silver medalist(s)	Jamaica
3rd place, bronze medalist(s)	Australia
4	New Zealand
5	South Africa
6	Malawi
