= Malawi at the 2026 Commonwealth Games =

- Flag of Malawi
- CG code: MAW
- CGA: Olympic and Commonwealth Games Association of Malawi
- Website: moc.org.mw

in Glasgow, Scotland 23 July 2026 – 2 August 2026
- Competitors: 25 in 5 sports
- Flag bearer: Deborah Mtenje
- Baton bearer: Zoe Rebello
- Medals: Gold 0 Silver 0 Bronze 0 Total 0

Commonwealth Games appearances (overview)
- 1970; 1974; 1978; 1982; 1986; 1990; 1994; 1998; 2002; 2006; 2010; 2014; 2018; 2022; 2026; 2030

Other related appearances
- Rhodesia and Nyasaland (1962)

Malawi competed at the 2026 Commonwealth Games in Glasgow, Scotland. This marked Malawi's 15th participation at the games, after making its debut at the 1970 Commonwealth Games.

The Malawi team competed in five sports. The Malawi team consisted of 25 athletes.

Boxer Deborah Mtenje was the country's flagbearer during the opening ceremony. Meanwhile, swimmer Zoe Rebello was the baton bearer during the opening ceremony.

The Malawi team won no medals at the Games, extending the country's 40 year medal drought.

== Competitors ==
The following is the list of number of competitors participating at the Games per sport/discipline.

Sport	Men	Women	Total
Athletics	2	2	4
Boxing	2	1	3
Judo	2	1	3
Netball	—N/a	12	12
Swimming	2	1	3
Total	8	17	25

== Athletics ==
Malawi entered four track and field athletes (two per gender). Chikondi Mwanyali did not compete in any event.

Athlete	Event	Heat		Semifinal		Final	
Athlete	Event	Result	Rank	Result	Rank	Result	Rank
Nathan Chisale	Men's 5000 metres	—N/a				15:06.12	23
Amanda Khondowe	Women's 100 metres	12.30	6	Did not advance			
Amanda Khondowe	Women's 200 metres	25.07	5	Did not advance			
Asimenye Simwaka	Women's 200 metres	23.60	4 q	23.71	8	Did not advance	
Asimenye Simwaka	Women's 400 metres	54.16	6 q	DQ		Did not advance	

== Boxing ==
Malawi entered three boxers (two men and one woman).

Athlete	Event	Round of 32	Round of 16	Quarterfinals	Semifinals	Final	
Athlete	Event	Opposition Result	Opposition Result	Opposition Result	Opposition Result	Opposition Result	Rank
Elias Bonzo	Men's 65 kg	Ryan (ANT); W RSC	Gracia (GIB); W 5–0	Katema (ZAM); L RSC	Did not advance		
Happy Ngwira	Men's 80 kg	Jan (ANT); L RSC	Did not advance				
Deborah Mtenje	Women's 54 kg	Bye	Pawar (IND); L RSC	Did not advance			

== Judo ==
Malawi entered three judoka (two men and one woman).

Athlete	Event	Round of 32	Round of 16	Quarterfinals	Semifinals	Repechage	Final/BM	
Athlete	Event	Opposition Result	Opposition Result	Opposition Result	Opposition Result	Opposition Result	Opposition Result	Rank
Chikondi Kathewera	Men's 60 kg	—N/a	Singh (IND); L 000–100	Did not advance				
Brave Chipokosa	Men's 73 kg	Bye	Levy (ENG); L 000–100	Did not advance				
Pemphero Tayall	Women's 52 kg	—N/a	Rioux (MRI); L 000–100	Did not advance				

== Netball ==
Malawi qualified as one of the top 11 eligible teams in the World Netball Rankings as of September 1, 2025.

Summary

Team	Event	Group stage						Semifinal	Final / BM / Cl.	
Team	Event	Opposition Result	Opposition Result	Opposition Result	Opposition Result	Opposition Result	Rank	Opposition Result	Opposition Result	Rank
Malawi national team	Women's tournament	South Africa; L 44–65	Northern Ireland; W 64–48	England; L 38–73	Australia; L 32–68	Tonga; W 55–49	4	—N/a	Seventh place match Scotland; W 54–47	7

Roster
The roster consisted of 12 athletes.

- Mphatso Banda
- Sophilet Banda
- Shabel Bengo
- Martha Dambo
- Aisha Gama
- Florence Jeke
- Mwayi Kumwenda
- Takondwa Lwazi
- Tendai Masamba
- Stellah Matelez
- Ethel Ng'ambi
- Melia Soko

Group stage

Pos	Team	Pld	W	D	L	GF	GA	GD	Pts	Qualification
1	Australia	5	5	0	0	378	191	+187	10	Semi-finals
2	England	5	4	0	1	355	224	+131	8	Semi-finals
3	South Africa	5	3	0	2	340	231	+109	6	Classification matches
4	Malawi	5	2	0	3	233	303	−70	4	Classification matches
5	Tonga	5	1	0	4	219	396	−177	2	Classification matches
6	Northern Ireland	5	0	0	5	191	371	−180	0	Classification matches

Source: Glasgow 2026

25 July 2026; 21:00	Report	South Africa	65–44	Malawi	OVO Hydro; Umpires: Alison Harrison, Georgina Sulley-Beales; Reserve umpire: Angela Armstrong-Lush
25 July 2026; 21:00	Report	Scoring by quarter: 18–12, 16–11, 15–9, 16–12			OVO Hydro; Umpires: Alison Harrison, Georgina Sulley-Beales; Reserve umpire: Angela Armstrong-Lush
25 July 2026; 21:00	Report	Elmeré van der Berg 48/52 (92%); Kamogelo Maseko 17/18 (94%)		Tendai Masamba 19/23 (83%); Ethel Ng'ambi 14/14 (100%); Mwai Kumwenda 9/9 (100%); Stellah Matelezi 2/3 (67%)	OVO Hydro; Umpires: Alison Harrison, Georgina Sulley-Beales; Reserve umpire: Angela Armstrong-Lush

26 July 2026; 14:00	Report	Malawi	64–48	Northern Ireland	OVO Hydro; Umpires: Tania Fink, Gary Burgess; Reserve umpire: Kristie Simpson
26 July 2026; 14:00	Report	Scoring by quarter: 19–9, 16–14, 9–15, 20–10			OVO Hydro; Umpires: Tania Fink, Gary Burgess; Reserve umpire: Kristie Simpson
26 July 2026; 14:00	Report	Mwai Kumwenda 57/58 (98%); Ethel Ng'ambi 7/7 (100%)		Lisa Bowman 30/34 (88%); Orlaith Rogers 15/19 (79%); Emma Magee 3/4 (75%)	OVO Hydro; Umpires: Tania Fink, Gary Burgess; Reserve umpire: Kristie Simpson

27 July 2026; 14:00	Report	Malawi	38–73	England	OVO Hydro; Umpires: Ken Metekingi, Tania Fink; Reserve umpire: Georgina Sulley-Beales
27 July 2026; 14:00	Report	Scoring by quarter: 9–18, 14–19, 10–18, 5–18			OVO Hydro; Umpires: Ken Metekingi, Tania Fink; Reserve umpire: Georgina Sulley-Beales
27 July 2026; 14:00	Report	Mwayi Kumwenda 20/23 (87%); Ethel Ng'ambi 7/7 (100%); Florence Jeke 5/6 (83%); Tendai Masamba 5/7 (71%); Stellah Matelezi 1/2 (50%)		Olivia Tchine 24/26 (92%); Eleanor Cardwell 21/21 (100%); Lois Pearson 16/17 (94%); Sasha Glasgow 9/10 (90%); Ella Clark 3/3 (100%)	OVO Hydro; Umpires: Ken Metekingi, Tania Fink; Reserve umpire: Georgina Sulley-Beales

28 July 2026; 21:00	Report	Australia	68–32	Malawi	OVO Hydro; Umpires: Gareth Fowler, Tania Fink; Reserve umpire: Angela Armstrong-Lush
28 July 2026; 21:00	Report	Scoring by quarter: 19–6, 19–7, 17–10, 13–9			OVO Hydro; Umpires: Gareth Fowler, Tania Fink; Reserve umpire: Angela Armstrong-Lush
28 July 2026; 21:00	Report	Cara Koenen 25/26 (96%); Sophie Garbin 22/25 (88%); Kiera Austin 13/14 (93%); Sophie Dwyer 8/8 (100%)		Mwayi Kumwenda 17/20 (85%); Tendai Masamba 11/13 (85%); Ethel Ng'ambi 4/5 (80%)	OVO Hydro; Umpires: Gareth Fowler, Tania Fink; Reserve umpire: Angela Armstrong-Lush

30 July 2026; 09:00	Report	Malawi	55–49	Tonga	OVO Hydro; Umpires: Louise Travis, Alison Harrison; Reserve umpire: Tania Fink
30 July 2026; 09:00	Report	Scoring by quarter: 14–15, 15–11, 14–13, 12–10			OVO Hydro; Umpires: Louise Travis, Alison Harrison; Reserve umpire: Tania Fink
30 July 2026; 09:00	Report	Mwayi Kumwenda 45/46 (98%); Ethel Ng'ambi 10/11 (91%)		Uneeq Palavi 35/37 (95%); Marie Payn 11/11 (100%); Sovika Pousini 3/4 (75%)	OVO Hydro; Umpires: Louise Travis, Alison Harrison; Reserve umpire: Tania Fink

Seventh place match

31 July 2026; 14:00	Report	Malawi	54–47	Scotland	OVO Hydro; Umpires: Gary Burgess, Tania Fink; Reserve umpire: Georgina Sulley-Beales
31 July 2026; 14:00	Report	Scoring by quarter: 17–12, 13–11, 12–12, 12–12			OVO Hydro; Umpires: Gary Burgess, Tania Fink; Reserve umpire: Georgina Sulley-Beales
31 July 2026; 14:00	Report	Mwayi Kumwenda 44/47 (94%); Ethel Ng'ambi 8/8 (100%); Tendai Masamba 2/2 (100%)		Emma Barrie 26/28 (93%); Niamh McCall 21/23 (91%)	OVO Hydro; Umpires: Gary Burgess, Tania Fink; Reserve umpire: Georgina Sulley-Beales

== Swimming ==
Malawi entered three swimmers, two males and one female.

Athlete	Event	Heat		Semifinal		Final	
Athlete	Event	Time	Rank	Time	Rank	Time	Rank
Asher Banda	Men's 50 m freestyle	26.25	58	Did not advance			
Asher Banda	Men's 100 m freestyle	1:00.15	60	Did not advance			
Asher Banda	Men's 50 m butterfly	28.52	60	Did not advance			
Luka Smit	Men's 50 m freestyle	24.46	44	Did not advance			
Luka Smit	Men's 100 m freestyle	54.39	51	Did not advance			
Luka Smit	Men's 50 m butterfly	28.34	58	Did not advance			
Zoe Rebello	Women's 50 m freestyle	30.57	63	Did not advance			
Zoe Rebello	Women's 50 m breaststroke	42.40	29	Did not advance			
Zoe Rebello	Women's 50 m butterfly	35.78	52	Did not advance			
