= 2014 Fast5 Netball World Series =

International Fast5 tournament hosted by New Zealand

Tournament details
- Host country: New Zealand
- City: Auckland
- Venue: Vector Arena
- Dates: 8–9 November 2014
- Teams: 6
- TV partner(s): Fox Sports (Australia); Sky Sport (New Zealand); SuperSport (South Africa); Digicel SuperMax (Caribbean)

Final positions
- Champions: New Zealand (5th title)
- Runners-up: Australia
- Third place: England

Tournament statistics
- Matches played: 18

The 2014 Fast5 Netball World Series was the 6th Fast5 Netball World Series. New Zealand hosted Australia, England, Jamaica, Malawi and South Africa in a series, played in November 2014, at Auckland's Vector Arena. With a team coached by Janine Southby and captained by Laura Langman, New Zealand won the series for the third time in a row with a 35–31 win over Australia in the final. England finished third after defeating Jamaica 31–30 in a play-off. The series was broadcast live on Fox Sports in Australia, on Sky Sport in New Zealand, Digicel SuperMax (Caribbean) and on SuperSport (South Africa). The Fox Sports commentary team featured Anne Sargeant.

== Squads ==
Participating teams and rosters
Australia	England	Jamaica	Malawi	New Zealand	South Africa
Karyn Bailey; Erin Bell (cc); Kate Beveridge; Ashleigh Brazill; Clare McMeniman (cc); Kate Moloney; Kate Shimmin; Gabi Simpson; Jo Weston; Amorette Wild	Ama Agbeze; Rosie Allison; Sara Bayman; Eboni Beckford-Chambers; Sam Cook; Kadeen Corbin; Jade Clarke (c); Rachel Dunn; Serena Guthrie; Jo Harten	Romelda Aiken; Nicole Aiken-Pinnock; Shanice Beckford; Nicole Dixon; Stacian Facey; Anna Kay Griffiths; Thristina Harwood; Malysha Kelly; Deneen Taylor; Khadijah Williams; Vangelee Williams	Grace Chazungulira; Jane Chimaliro; Tina Kamzati; Bridget Kumwenda; Mwai Kumwenda; Takondwa Lwazi; Caroline Mtukule (c); Grace Mwafulirwa; Sindi Simtowe; Towera Vinkhumbo	Kayla Cullen; Katrina Grant; Temalisi Fakahokotau; Shannon Francois; Ellen Halpenny; Bailey Mes; Laura Langman (c); Malia Paseka; Jamie-Lee Price; Grace Rasmussen	Lauren-Lee Christians; Maryka Holtzhausen (c); Mari-Lena Joubert; Tumelo Mantjiu; Phumza Maweni; Amanda Mynhardt; Bhongo Nqubeni; Elsunet du Plessis; Vanes-Mari du Toit; Shadine van der Merwe
Head Coach: Jane Searle	Head Coach: Anna Mayes	Head Coach: Minneth Reynolds	Head Coach: Mary Waya	Head Coach: Janine Southby	Head Coach: Elize Kotze
Assistant coach: Jane Woodlands-Thompson	Assistant coaches: Colette Thomson; Jess Thirlby	Assistant coach: Annette Daley	Assistant coach: Connie Mhone	Assistant coach: Julie Seymour	Assistant coach: Martha Mosoahle-Samm

Notes

- ^1 Casey Kopua and Irene van Dyk were both included in the original New Zealand squad. However they both withdrew because of injuries. They were subsequently replaced by Jamie-Lee Price and Malia Paseka respectively. Van Dyk remained with the New Zealand squad as a technical advisor.
- ^2 Mwai Kumwenda did not travel to the tournament with Malawi.

== Match officials ==
Umpires

Umpire	Association
Angela Armstrong-Lush	New Zealand
Dave Brown	Jamaica
Annie Kloppers	South Africa
Lisa McPhail	New Zealand
Jackie Mizon	England
Kristie Simpson	New Zealand
Marielouw van der Merwe	South Africa

Umpire Appointments Panel

Umpire	Association
Dawn Jones	New Zealand
David Pala'amo	New Zealand
Mandy Nottingham	New Zealand

== Round robin stage ==
=== Round 1 ===
8 November 2014	Australia	34–13	Jamaica
11:00 (NZDT)

8 November 2014	England	44–22	South Africa
11:45 NZDT

8 November 2014	New Zealand	49–26	Malawi
12:30 NZDT

=== Round 2 ===
8 November 2014	Australia	30–8	South Africa
13:15 NZDT

8 November 2014	Jamaica	29–28	Malawi
14:00 NZDT

8 November 2014	New Zealand	30–26	England
14:45 NZDT

=== Round 3 ===
8 November 2014	Jamaica	45–20	South Africa
16:00 NZDT

8 November 2014	England	42–39	Malawi
16:45 NZDT

8 November 2014	New Zealand	30–21	Australia
17:30 NZDT

=== Round 4 ===
9 November 2014	Jamaica	27–26	England
10:30 NZDT

9 November 2014	Australia	35–33	Malawi
11:15 NZDT

9 November 2014	New Zealand	34–25	South Africa
12:00 NZDT

=== Round 5 ===
9 November 2014	Australia	31–24	England
12:45 NZDT		Report

9 November 2014	South Africa	33–30	Malawi
13:30 NZDT

9 November 2014	New Zealand	35–10	Jamaica
13:30 NZDT

=== Ladder ===
Pos	Team	P	W	L	D	GF	GA	GD	Pts
1	New Zealand	5	5	0	0	178	108	+70	10
2	Australia	5	4	1	0	151	108	+43	8
3	Jamaica	5	3	2	0	123	143	-20	6
4	England	5	2	3	0	162	149	+13	4
5	South Africa	5	1	4	0	108	183	-75	2
6	Malawi	5	0	5	0	156	188	-32	0

Qualified for the final
Qualified for 3rd/4th place match
Qualified for 5th/6th place match

== Playoffs ==
=== 5th v 6th Playoff ===
9 November 2014	South Africa	33–30	Malawi
16:15 NZDT

=== 3rd v 4th Playoff ===
9 November 2014	England	31–30	Jamaica
17:05 NZDT

=== Final ===
9 November 2014	New Zealand	35–31	Australia
17:55 NZDT

== Award winners ==
Award	Winner	Team
Player of the Series	Laura Langman	New Zealand

== Final Placings ==
Rank	Team
1st place, gold medalist(s)	New Zealand
2nd place, silver medalist(s)	Australia
3rd place, bronze medalist(s)	England
4	Jamaica
5	South Africa
6	Malawi
