= 2016 Fast5 Netball World Series =

International Fast5 tournament hosted by Australia

Tournament details
- Host country: Australia
- City: Melbourne
- Venue: Hisense Arena
- Dates: 29–30 October 2016
- Teams: 6
- TV partner(s): Nine (Australia); Sky Sports (UK/Ireland); Sky Sport (New Zealand)

Final positions
- Champions: New Zealand (6th title)
- Runners-up: Australia
- Third place: Malawi

Tournament statistics
- Matches played: 18
- Top scorer(s): Mwai Kumwenda

The 2016 Fast5 Netball World Series was the 7th Fast5 Netball World Series. Australia hosted England, Jamaica, Malawi, New Zealand and South Africa in a series, played in October 2016, at Melbourne's Hisense Arena. With a team coached by Kiri Wills and captained by Maria Tutaia, New Zealand won the series for the fourth time in a row with a comprehensive 41–16 win over Australia in the final. Malawi finished third after defeating England 35–32 in a play-off. In Australia, the series was broadcast live by Nine's Wide World of Sports, via 9Gem and 9Now. The broadcast was hosted by Sylvia Jeffreys, with a commentary panel that included Liz Ellis, Laura Geitz, Sharni Layton, Sharelle McMahon and Anne Sargeant. The series was also broadcast live by Sky Sport in New Zealand and on Sky Sports in the United Kingdom and Ireland.

== Squads ==
Participating teams and rosters
Australia	England	Jamaica	Malawi	New Zealand	South Africa
Erin Bell; Courtney Bruce; Paige Hadley; Kate Moloney; Caitlyn Nevins; Susan Pettitt (c); Kate Shimmin; Caitlin Thwaites; Gretel Tippett; Jo Weston	Ama Agbeze (c); Eleanor Cardwell; Beth Cobden; Kadeen Corbin; Joanne Harten; Helen Housby; Leah Kennedy; Laura Malcolm; Geva Mentor; Natalie Panagarry	Nicole Aiken-Pinnock; Gezelle Allison; Althea Byfield (c); Nicole Dixon; Kasey Evering; Anna Kay Griffiths; Trishana Hanson; Shantal Slater; Vanessa Walker; Vangelee Williams	Jane Chimaliro; Thandie Galleta; Joanna Kachilika; Bridget Kumwenda; Mwai Kumwenda; Takondwa Lwazi; Jessia Mazengera; Joyce Mvula; Grace Mwafulirwa (c); Towera Vinkhumbo	Gina Crampton; Jamie Hume; Phoenix Karaka; Kelly Jury; Storm Purvis; Te Paea Selby-Rickit; Samantha Sinclair; Maria Tutaia (c); Jane Watson; Maia Wilson	Charmaine Baard; Lauren-Lee Christians (c); Marlize de Bruin; Phumza Maweni; Tshinakaho Mdau; Fikile Mkhuzangwe; Tanya Mostert; Mignesia Nhleko; Juline Rossouw; Ine-Marí Venter
Head Coach: Jane Searle	Head Coach: Tracey Neville	Head Coach: Connie Francis	Head Coach:	Head Coach: Kiri Wills	Head Coach: Elsjé Jordaan
Assistant coach: Jane Woodlands-Thompson	Assistant coach:	Assistant coach: Elaine Davis	Assistant coach:	Assistant coach: Mary-Jane Araroa	Assistant coach:

== Round robin stage ==
=== Round 1 ===
29 October 2016	Australia	24–23	Malawi
13:45 (AEDST)		Report

29 October 2016	Jamaica	35–32	South Africa
14:30 (AEDST)		Report

29 October 2016	New Zealand	26–25	England
15:15 (AEDST)		Report

=== Round 2 ===
29 October 2016	Australia	35–19	Jamaica
16:00 AEDST		Report

29 October 2016	England	43–22	Malawi
16:45 AEDST		Report

29 October 2016	New Zealand	49–20	South Africa
17:30 AEDST		Report

=== Round 3 ===
29 October 2016	Malawi	46–12	Jamaica
18:15 AEDST		Report

29 October 2016	England	29–29	South Africa
19:00 AEDST		Report

29 October 2016	Australia	32–29	New Zealand
19:45 AEDST		Report

=== Round 4 ===
30 October 2016	Malawi	36–21	South Africa
12:15 AEDST		Report

30 October 2016	Australia	26–20	England
13:00 AEDST		Report

30 October 2016	New Zealand	26-16	Jamaica
13:45 AEDST		Report

=== Round 5 ===
30 October 2016	Australia	31–14	South Africa
14:30 AEDST		Report

30 October 2016	New Zealand	52–27	Malawi
15:15 AEDST		Report

30 October 2016	England	32–19	Jamaica
16:00 AEDST		Report

=== Ladder ===
Pos	Team	P	W	D	L	GF	GA	%	Pts
1	Australia	5	5	0	0	148	105	140.9	10
2	New Zealand	5	4	0	1	192	130	147.7	8
3	England	5	2	1	2	159	132	120.5	5
4	Malawi	5	2	0	3	154	152	101.3	4
5	Jamaica	5	1	0	4	101	171	59.1	2
6	South Africa	5	0	1	4	116	180	64.4	1

Qualified for the final
Qualified for 3rd/4th place match
Qualified for 5th/6th place match

== Playoffs ==
=== 5th v 6th Playoff ===
30 October 2016	Jamaica	34–33	South Africa
17:25 AEDST

=== 3rd v 4th Playoff ===
30 October 2016	Malawi	35–32	England
18:35 AEDST

=== Final ===
30 October 2016	Australia	16–41	New Zealand
19:25 AEDST

== Award winners ==
Award	Winner	Team
Player of the Series	Joanne Harten	England
Top scorer of the Series	Mwai Kumwenda	Malawi

== Final Placings ==
Rank	Team
1st place, gold medalist(s)	New Zealand
2nd place, silver medalist(s)	Australia
3rd place, bronze medalist(s)	Malawi
4	England
5	Jamaica
6	South Africa
