= Peace Chawinga-Kaluwa =

Malawian netball player and coach

- Born: c.1974
- Education: St Pius Girls Primary School
- Occupations: netball player and coach

Peace Chawinga-Kaluwa born Peace Chawinga (born c.1974) is a Malawian netball player and coach. She was a stalwart member of the Malawi national netball team for over twenty years and she became the national coach on more than one occasion.

== Life ==
Chawinga was born in about 1974. She attended and played netball for St Pius Girls Primary School. Because she was interested in netball, she would watch older players at Blantyre Youth Centre to learn their tricks. While still at school she was chosen to play for the "Shelter Nets" team.

In 1990, when she was sixteen and playing for the Admarc Tigresses, she was first included as a member of "The Queens" who are the Malawi national netball team by the coach, Grace Sithole.

Chawinga was a member of the national team for over two decades.

The Queens were coached by Chawinga in 2018. She replaced Whyte Mlilima, who was appointed as caretaker head coach after the regular coach, Griffin Saenda, had to withdraw on medical grounds.

Chawinga took the Queens, as coach, to the 2021 Africa Netball Cup. In her time as national coach she was credited with engaging many new players including the sisters of Mildred, Josephine and Andrina Simongwa, Felia Tsongo, Stella Kumwende, Ruth Kaipe, Tiyezge Chewinga, Linda Magombo, Annie Mopihe, Beatrice Mpinganjira, Caroline Mtukule, Jean Matola and Connie Mhone.

Chawinga was fired as national coach in 2023 and she sued for unfair dismissal. Eight months later Joanna Kachilika was named as Malawi's National Team Coach at the beginning of 2024. She was chosen and appointed but there was no regular wage because of funding shortfalls. In November 2024 Kachilika was replaced. This time the choice was to have co-coaches for the national team of Peace Chawinga-Kaluwa and Mary Waya. Waya had been the national coach for Namibia. It was rumoured that Chawinga may have put aside her legal dispute when she was re-appointed to a coaching position.

She and Waya announced a twelve person team for the 2025 Netball Nations Cup. There were six new names and six experienced players who were Joyce Mvula, Takondwa Lwazi-Chiwaya, Towera Vinkhumbo, Grace Mwafulirwa-Mhango, Thandi Galeta and Martha Dambo.
