= 2025 Netball Nations Cup =

International netball tournament

Tournament details
- Host country: England
- Cities: Nottingham; London
- Venue(s): Motorpoint Arena; Copper Box Arena
- Dates: 1–9 February 2025
- Teams: 4
- TV partner(s): Sky Sports Mix/Sky Sports YouTube (UK/Ireland); SuperSport (South Africa); NetballPass

Final positions
- Champions: England (1st title)
- Runners-up: South Africa
- Third place: Uganda

Tournament statistics
- Matches played: 8

The 2025 Vitality Netball Nations Cup was an international netball series hosted and organised by England Netball in February 2025. It featured England, South Africa, Malawi and Uganda. The series was played over two successive weekends. The first weekend was played at Nottingham's Motorpoint Arena, and the second weekend was played at London's Copper Box Arena. With a team coached by Jess Thirlby and captained by Fran Williams, England won the series after defeating South Africa 61–55 in the final. It proved sixth time lucky for England. Since the Nations Cup/Quad Series was established in 2012, England had finished as runners up five times. Uganda finished third after defeating Malawi 50–45 in a play-off. The series was broadcast live on Sky Sports Mix and Sky Sports YouTube in the United Kingdom and Ireland, on SuperSport in South Africa and on NetballPass worldwide.

== Squads ==
Participating teams and rosters
England	Malawi	South Africa	Uganda
Halimat Adio; Imogen Allison; Amy Carter; Beth Cobden; Zara Everitt; Funmi Fadoju; Berri Neil; Razia Quashie; Ellie Rattu; Paige Reed; Alicia Scholes; Olivia Tchine; Emma Thacker; Fran Williams (c)	Shabel Bengo; Martha Dambo; Thandie Galleta; Florence Gamuka; Ruth Kaliyenda; Takondwa Lwazi; Thoko Makunganya; Tendai Masamba; Joyce Mvula; Grace Mwafulirwa; Ethel Ng'ambi; Towera Vinkhumbo (c)	Nicholé Breedt; Khanyisa Chawane (c); Syntiche Kabuya; Boitumelo Mahloko; Kamogelo Maseko; Tarle Mathe; Owethu Ngubane; Refiloe Nketsa; Ané Retief; Rolene Streutker; Jeanté Strydom; Elmeré van der Berg; Jamie van Wyk; Ine-Marí Venter; Sanmarie Visser	Peneople Amiya; Gloria Ayaa; Margaret Baagala; Mary Cholhok; Irene Eyaru (c); Privas Kayeny; Haniisha Muhameed; Nasiimu Mutesi; Sandra Nambirige; Christine Namulumba; Hindu Namutebi; Racheal Nanyonga; Joan Ryekoboth
Head Coach: Jess Thirlby	Co-head Coach: Peace Chawinga-Kaluwa	Head Coach: Jenny van Dyk	Head Coach: Rashid Mubiru
Assistant coach: Anna Stembridge; Specialist coach: Sharni Norder	Co-head Coach: Mary Waya	Assistant coach: Zanele Mdodana	Assistant coach: Ruth Meeme

== Debuts and milestones ==
- On 1 February 2025, umpire Gary Burgess officiated his 150th international match when he took charge of the Round 1 match game between South Africa and Uganda.
- On 1 February 2025, Syntiche Kabuya made her senior debut for South Africa against Uganda.
- On 1 February 2025, England's Paige Reed opened the scoring and was named Player of the Match as she made her senior international debut against Malawi.

== Match officials ==
Umpires

Umpire	Association
Tamara Buriani-Gennai	Australia
Gary Burgess	England
Tracy-Ann Griffiths	Jamaica
Alison Harrison	Wales
Anso Kemp	South Africa
Ken Metekingi	New Zealand

Umpire Appointments Panel

Umpire	Association
Heather Gleadall	England
Jackie Mizon	England
Marielouw Van der Merwe	South Africa

== Round robin stage ==
=== Round 1 ===
1 February 2025	South Africa	75–40	Uganda	Motorpoint Arena
15:00

1 February 2025	England	62–36	Malawi	Motorpoint Arena
17:00

=== Round 2 ===
2 February 2025	Malawi	59–45	Uganda	Motorpoint Arena
14:00

2 February 2025	England	59–61	South Africa	Motorpoint Arena
16:00

=== Round 3 ===
8 February 2025	South Africa	58–55	Malawi	Copper Box Arena
15:00

8 February 2025	England	59–48	Uganda	Copper Box Arena
17:00

=== Final table ===
Pos	Team	P	W	L	D	GF	GA	GD	Pts
1	South Africa	3	3	0	0	194	154	+40	6
2	England	3	2	1	0	180	145	+35	4
3	Malawi	3	1	2	0	150	165	-15	2
4	Uganda	3	0	3	0	133	193	-60	0

Qualified for Final
Qualified for 3rd/4th place match

== Playoffs ==
=== 3rd v 4th Playoff ===
9 February 2025	Uganda	50–45	Malawi	Copper Box Arena
13:30

=== Final ===
9 February 2025	England	61–55	South Africa	Copper Box Arena
16:00

== Award winners ==
Award	Winner	Team
Vitality Player of the Series	Olivia Tchine	England

== Final Placings ==
Rank	Team
1st place, gold medalist(s)	England
2nd place, silver medalist(s)	South Africa
3rd place, bronze medalist(s)	Uganda
4	Malawi
