= 2021 Netball Legends Series =

Tournament details
- Country: England
- Dates: 20–24 January 2021
- Teams: 2

Final positions
- Champions: England
- Runners-up: (United Kingdom) Superleague All-Stars

Tournament statistics
- Matches played: 3

The England national netball team played a three-match test series (officially referred to as the 2021 Vitality Legends Series) against an All-Stars team made up of players from the Superleague competition in the United Kingdom. The series took place between 20 and 24 January 2021 and replaced a previously scheduled series between England and Jamaica, which was cancelled due to the impact of the COVID-19 pandemic. The three matches were played behind closed doors at the David Wallace Arena in Loughborough. The series was won by England, who defeated the All-Stars three games to nil, and in so doing won the Jean Hornsby Cup.

== Squads ==
England vs. All-Stars
England	All-Stars
Eleanor Cardwell; George Fisher; Sophie Drakeford-Lewis; Helen Housby; Laura Malcolm; Serena Guthrie (captain); Natalie Haythornthwaite; Beth Cobden; Jade Clarke; Imogen Allison; Francesca Williams; Razia Quashie; Vicki Oyesola; Layla Guscoth; Head Coach: Jess Thirlby	Gezelle Allison; Caroline O’Hanlon; Gia Abernethy; Jo Trip; Joyce Mvula; Liana Leota (captain); Loreen Ngwira; Natalie Panagarry; Rebekah Robinson; Samantha May; Summer Artman; Yasmin Parsons; Fionnuala Toner; Head Coach: Karen Greig

== Matches ==
=== First test ===
20 January 2021; 7:30 pm	Report	England	70–54	All-Stars	David Wallace Arena, Loughborough	Sky Sports
20 January 2021; 7:30 pm	Report	Scoring by quarter: 12-10, 14-9, 19-16, 17-12			David Wallace Arena, Loughborough	Sky Sports

=== Second test ===
22 January 2021; 7:30 pm	Report	England	67–44	All-Stars	David Wallace Arena, Loughborough	Sky Sports

=== Third test ===
24 January 2021; 7:30 pm	Report	England	55–43	All-Stars	David Wallace Arena, Loughborough	Sky Sports
