= Chawinga =

Chawinga is a surname. Notable people with the surname include:

- Peace Chawinga (born c. 1974), birth name of Peace Chawinga-Kaluwa, Malawian netball player and coach
- Tabitha Chawinga (born 1996), Malawian footballer, older sister of Temwa
- Temwa Chawinga (born 1998), Malawian footballer
