= Zara Everitt =

English international netball player

Personal information
- Full name: Zara Everitt
- Born: 5 May 2000 (age 26)
- Occupation: Trainee Solicitor
- Height: 183 cm (6 ft 0 in)
- Relative: Darcie Everitt
- School: Aylesbury High School; Haileybury
- University: University of Oxford; University of Law

Netball career
- Playing positions: WD, GD
Years	Club team	Apps
2017-2018	Hertfordshire Mavericks	
2019	Loughborough Lightning	
2020-present	London Pulse	
Years	National team	Caps
2016-2020	England U17-U21	
2021	England Future Roses	
2022-present	England	4
- Updated on April 2025

Zara Everitt (born 5 May 2000) is an English international netball player. She plays for London Pulse in the Netball Super League.

== Early life ==
Everitt first played netball for MK Netters. Her younger sister Darcie Everitt is also a netball player for London Pulse. She attended Aylesbury High School before joining Haileybury and Imperial Service College for sixth form.

== Club career ==
=== Hertfordshire Mavericks ===
Everitt came through the Mavericks pathway and was named in the senior squad for the 2017 season, making her debut aged 16.

=== Loughborough Lightning ===
Everitt joined Loughborough Lightning ahead of the 2019 season and helped the team place fourth.

=== London Pulse ===
She signed for London Pulse ahead of the 2020 season, leading the team to a fourth-place finish in 2022 and captained the side in the 2023 Grand Final, where they were defeated by Loughborough Lightning. Everitt was renamed pulse captain ahead of the 2025 season, her fourth season in a row. Everitt captained her side to their first Super League Grand final title in 2025, defeating Loughborough Lightning 53-45.

== England ==
Everitt represented England at Under-17, Under-19, and Under-21, captaining both Under-19 and Under-21 sides. She was first selected for a tour of Jamaica in 2016 before being included in the long squad for the 2017 World Youth Cup in Botswana. Everitt made making her senior Vitality Roses debut in 2022 in their 2022 series against Uganda. She then captained England at the 2022 Fast5 Netball World Series where they placed fourth. She captained England again at the 2024 Fast5 Netball World Series. Everitt was recalled to the Vitality Roses squad for the 2025 Netball Nations Cup where the team won gold.

Tournaments	Place
2019 Netball Europe Open Championships	1st
2022 Fast5 Netball World Series	4th
2024 Fast5 Netball World Series	5th
2025 Netball Nations Cup	1st

== Personal life ==
She balanced Super League netball alongside her studies for a law degree at the University of Oxford, where she also captained the university netball team and was awarded a Full Blue. She completed a master's degree in law and business from the University of Law, and now works as a trainee solicitor.

== Honours ==
=== England ===
- Netball Nations Cup: 2025

=== London Pulse ===
- Netball Super League: 2025 Runners up: 2023
