= Beatrice Mpinganjira =

Malawian national netball team member and trainer

- Occupation: netballer
- Known for: national netball team member

Beatrice Mpinganjira is a Malawian national netball team member and trainer. She played for Malawi at the 2014 Commonwealth Games.

== Life ==
In October 2009 she was in Manchester in the UK. The World Netball Series' inaugural event took place at the MEN Arena. Six countries sent teams including Malawi and Mpinganjira was in coach Edith Kaliati's team. Kaliati included her again in the Malawi national netball team in the following year's 2010 World Netball Series when Malawi was again in the top six national teams and the matches were help in Liverpool.

She joined Malawi at the 2014 Commonwealth Games in Glasgow.

In 2017 the national team went to the UK to play three matches against the England team and Mpinganjira was "sidelined" and not included in the team. Ironically she had feature earlier in the year as a "role-model" when a competition was announced for schools. She had encouraged parents to send their children to school arguing that educated children were likely to find jobs, like hers, that would enable them to look after their parents as they got older.

In January 2024 Joanna Kachilika was named as Malawi's National Team Coach. She took over following an eight-month hiatus after the dismissal of Peace Chawinga-Kaluwa. Her assistant was to be Eleanor Mapulanga and Mpinganjira was the trainer. In the November the national team's managers were rearranged and Peace Chawinga-Kaluwa and Mpinganjira were both reassigned. Mpinganjira lost her position as the senior team's physical trainer, but she was given a similar role for the national under-19 netball team.
