= Grace Mwafulirwa =

Malawian netball player (born 1987)

Personal information
- Full name: Grace Mwafulirwa Mhango
- Born: 24 December 1987 (age 38)
- Occupation: netball player
- Height: 1.72 m (5 ft 8 in)

Netball career
- Playing positions: wing defense, goal defense

Grace Mwafulirwa Mhango (born 24 December 1987) is a Malawian netball player who plays for Malawi in the positions of goal defense or wing defense. She has featured in four consecutive World Cup tournaments for Malawi in 2011, 2015, 2019, and 2023. She has also competed at the Commonwealth Games on three successive occasions in 2010 and 2014 representing Malawi.

In September 2019, she was included in the Malawian squad for the 2019 African Netball Championships.

In 2023 she was in the national side when they played and were beaten by England in the Netball World Cup. The other six of the starting Malawian seven were Loreen Ngwira (GK), Towera Vinkhumbo, Takondwa Lwazi, Jane Chimaliro, Thandie Galleta and Joyce Mvula.

National co-coaches Peace Chawinga-Kaluwa and Mary Waya announced a twelve-person squad for the 2025 Netball Nations Cup. They chose six new names and six experienced players who were Mwafulirwa, Joyce Mvula, Takondwa Lwazi-Chiwaya, Towera Vinkhumbo, Thandie Galleta and Martha Dambo.
