= Bridget Kumwenda =

Malawi netball international

Personal information
- Full name: Bridget Kumwenda Chalera
- Born: Bridget Kumwenda; 8 September 1991 (age 34) Mzimba, Malawi
- Height: 1.58 m (5 ft 2 in)
- Relative: ^{(Note 1)}

Netball career
- Playing positions: WA, C
Years	Club team	Apps
200x–2012	Escom Sisters	
2012–	→ Kukoma Diamonds	
Years	National team	Caps
201x–	Malawi	
Medal record
Representing Malawi
Fast5 World Series
Bronze medal – third place	2016 Melbourne	Team

Bridget Kumwenda (born 8 September 1991), also referred to as Bridget Chalera or Bridget Kumwenda Chalera, is a Malawi netball international player. She represented Malawi at the 2011, 2015 and 2019 Netball World Cups and at the 2018 Commonwealth Games. Kumwenda was also a member of the Malawi team that finished third at the 2016 Fast5 Netball World Series.

== Early life and family ==
Kumwenda was born in Mzimba district, Malawi. She is a Tumbuka by tribe.

== Playing career ==
=== Escom Sisters ===
At club level Kumwenda played for Escom Sisters. She continued to play for the team when they were renamed Kukoma Diamonds.

=== Malawi ===
Kumwenda represented Malawi at the 2011, 2015 and 2019 Netball World Cups and at the 2018 Commonwealth Games. Kumwenda was also a member of the Malawi team that finished third at the 2016 Fast5 Netball World Series.

Tournaments	Place
2011 World Netball Championships	6th
2012 Diamond Challenge	2nd
2012 Fast5 Netball World Series	5th
2013 African Netball Championship	2nd
2013 Taini Jamison Trophy Series	2nd
2013 Fast5 Netball World Series	5th
2014 Fast5 Netball World Series	6th
2015 Netball World Cup	6th
2016 Fast5 Netball World Series	3rd place, bronze medalist(s)
2018 Taini Jamison Trophy Series	3rd
2018 Commonwealth Games	7th
2019 Netball World Cup	6th
2019 Africa Netball Cup	

== Notes ==
- ^1 Some sources suggest that Mwai Kumwenda (b. 1989) and Bridget (b. 1991) are sisters. However, in interviews Mwai Kumwenda has stated she is the youngest sibling in her family. None of the interviews mention Bridget being a sister.
