= Kate Walsh (netball) =

Australian netball player in the Suncorp Super Netball league

Personal information
- Full name: Kate Walsh (Née: Shimmin)
- Born: 13 February 1992 (age 34)
- Height: 185 cm (6 ft 1 in)
- Spouse: Trevor Walsh (m. 2022)

Netball career
- Playing positions: GD, GK
Years	Club team	Apps
2011–2016	Adelaide Thunderbirds	
2017	Queensland Firebirds	
2018–2020	Adelaide Thunderbirds	
2021–2022	Sunshine Coast Lightning	
Years	National team	Caps
2012–2017	Australia (Fast 5)	
2019–	England	
Medal record
Representing Australia
Silver medal – second place	2014 New Zealand	Team
Silver medal – second place	2016 Australia	Team
- Updated on 2022-03-19

Kate Walsh (née Shimmin; born in 1992) is an Australian netball player, most recently in the Suncorp Super Netball league, playing for the Sunshine Coast Lightning. In August 2019, Jess Thirlby the new England Roses Coach announced Walsh would join the full time England Roses programme.

Walsh grew up in South Australia and was a part of the South Australian Institute of Sport Volleyball program before being offered a SASI Netball scholarship which she chose over volleyball. When she finished High School she moved to Canberra where she developed her skills at the Australian Institute of Sport.

== Domestic career ==
In 2011, after a year at the AIS, Shimmin was offered her first contract to play for the Adelaide Thunderbirds and went on to play for them up until and including the 2016 season, she was a part of the team that won the premiership in the 2013 season. At the end of the 2016 season, she was offered a contract at the Queensland Firebirds for 2017 and had a short stint there before moving back to South Australia to play for the Thunderbirds in the 2018 season. She was re-signed for the 2019 Suncorp Super Netball League by the Adelaide Thunderbirds.. From 2021 she played for the Sunshine Coast Lightning and on 10 November 2022, she announced her retirement from elite netball and will therefore not play in the upcoming Suncorp Superleague Netball Season for 2023

== Australia 21/U Team ==
She was a part of the Australian 21/U team and represented her country in multiple countries and at the World Youth Cup in Glasgow where she was the Vice Captain of the team. In 2017, Shimmin travelled with the Australian Diamonds as a training partner for the 2017 Quad Series.

== Fast5 ==
Shimmin was a part of the Australian fast5 team From 2012-2017 inclusive that competed in the Fast5 Netball World Series and were runners up in 2013, 2014 and 2015 to rivals New Zealand.

== Netball Career Facts ==
- AIS Scholarship Holder (2010)
- Adelaide Thunderbirds debut (2011)
- Adelaide Thunderbirds Team Member (2011-2016, 2018–2020)
- Australian Fast 5 Team Member (2012, 2014-2017)
- Australian U21 World Youth Team Vice Captain - 2013
- Adelaide Thunderbirds Tanya Denver Medal Winner (2016)
- Queensland Firebirds Team Member (2017)
- England Roses Full Time Squad (August 2019)
- Sunshine Coast Lightning Team Member (2021-2022)
