= Alinafe Kamwala =

Malawian netball player (born 1994)

Personal information
- Born: 15 October 1994 (age 31)
- Occupation: netball player
- Height: 1.80

Netball career
- Playing positions: goal attack, goal shooter

Alinafe Kamwala (born 15 October 1994) is a Malawian netball player who plays for Malawi in the positions of goal attack or goal shooter. She was included in the Malawian squad for the 2019 Netball World Cup, which is also her first World Cup tournament.
