= Mary Waya =

Malawian netball player and coach

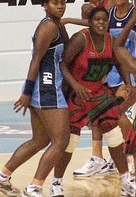
- 20 March 2006: Waya (GA, right) playing for Malawi against Fiji at the 2006 Commonwealth Games

Personal information
- Born: 22 May 1972 (age 54) Bwaila, Lilongwe, Malawi
- Occupations: Coach and Electric engineer
- Height: 1.62 m (5 ft 4 in)
- Spouse: Fumu Ng'oma
- Relatives: Emmie Waya, Harry Waya, George Waya, Lawrence Waya
- School: Chichiri Secondary School
- University: University of Malawi The Polytechnic

Netball career
- Playing positions: GA, GS
| Years | National team | Caps |
| 1984–2014 | Malawi | |
Coaching career
- Years: Team
- 2010–present: Malawi U20
- Updated on 16 June 2011

Mary Waya (born 22 May 1972) is a Malawian netball player and coach. Waya started playing international-level netball at age 16 in 1988, and has played in more than 200 representative matches for Malawi. During that time she has competed in two World Netball Championships (1995 and 2007), three Commonwealth Games (1998, 2006 and 2010), and two World Netball Series (2009 and 2010).

== Career ==
=== As a netball player ===
Waya came to international prominence during the 2007 World Championships in New Zealand, where the Malawian national team (the "Queens") finished 5th, their highest ever placing. She announced her retirement after the tournament, but returned to international competition the following year. She remains the national team's most high-profile player, and was chosen as the flag bearer for the Malawi team at the 2010 Commonwealth Games in Delhi.

After the 2010 World Series in Liverpool, Waya again announced her retirement from international netball, along with Queens veterans Peace Chawinga-Kalua and Esther Nkhoma.

In domestic netball, Waya played for the MTL Queens. She was married to the late Bullets FC player Fumu Ng'oma, before they later separated; Waya and Ng'oma have two sons.

=== As a netball coach ===
She turned her attention to coaching, and later that year stepped into the role of head coach of the Malawi U-20 netball team.

The Netball Association of Malawi (NAM) held negotiations with the three retired players to try to convince them to return to the Queens. On 15 June 2011, the NAM announced that Waya had agreed to return to the national team, along with Queens veterans Esther Nkhoma and Sylvia Mtetemela; Peace Chawinga-Kalua had earlier signed as assistant coach for the team. Media reports in Malawi indicated that the return of the three veterans players had caused major tension in the Queens squad, which led Waya to withdraw early from the squad's training camp. She was named as the coach of the Tanzania National Netball Team in 2012.

In July 2022, Waya was announced as the new Namibia National Netball Team coach

In November 2024, the choice was to have co-coaches for the Malawian national team of Waya and Peace Chawinga-Kaluwa. Chawinga-Kaluwa had previously been the Malawian coach before Joanna Kachilika, who the two replaced.

Peace Chawinga-Kaluwa and Waya announced a twelve person team for the 2025 Netball Nations Cup. They chose six new names and six experienced players, who were Joyce Mvula, Takondwa Lwazi-Chiwaya, Towera Vinkhumbo, Grace Mwafulirwa-Mhango, Thandi Galeta and Martha Dambo.
