= Thandie Galleta =

Malawian netball player (born 1993)

Personal information
- Born: 27 January 1993 (age 33)
- Occupation: netball player
- Height: 1.62 m (5 ft 4 in)

Netball career
- Playing positions: WA, C

Thandie Galleta (born 27 January 1993) is a Malawian netball player who plays for Malawi in the positions of WA or C. She has played in two Commonwealth Games and in 2025 she was an experienced member of the squad.

== Career ==
She has featured in two World Cup tournaments for Malawi in 2015 and in 2019. She made her Commonwealth Games debut representing Malawi at the 2018 Commonwealth Games.

She was named in Malawian netball squad for the women's netball tournament at the 2022 Commonwealth Games.

In 2023 she was in the national side when they played and were beaten by England in the Netball World Cup. The other six of the starting Malawian seven were Loreen Ngwira (GK), Towera Vinkhumbo, Takondwa Lwazi, Jane Chimaliro, Grace Mwafulirwa and Joyce Mvula.

National co-coaches Peace Chawinga-Kaluwa and Mary Waya announced a twelve-person squad for the 2025 Netball Nations Cup. They chose six new names and six experienced players who were Galleta, Grace Mwafulirwa, Joyce Mvula, Takondwa Lwazi-Chiwaya, Towera Vinkhumbo, Thandie Galleta and Martha Dambo.
