= Takondwa Lwazi =

Malawian netball player

Personal information
- Born: 15 May 1992 (age 34) Lilongwe, Malawi
- Occupation: netball player
- Height: 1.60 m (5 ft 3 in)

Netball career
- Playing positions: C, WA

Takondwa Lwazi also spelt as Takwonda Lwazi (born 15 May 1992) is a Malawian netball player who plays for Malawi internationally and for Malawian local club Blue Eagles in the positions of C and WA. She is known as one of the finest netball centre players to have played for Malawi despite being only 160 cm tall in height. She also serves as a Police Sergeant in the Malawi Police Service.

== Career ==
She was part of the Malawi team which finished at fifth position at the 2013 Fast5 Netball World Series. In the same tournament, Malawi stunned England twice in the round robin match and in the playoff for the fifth place. Takondwa made her Commonwealth Games debut representing Malawi at the Commonwealth Games in 2014 where Malawi finished at fifth position.

She was part of the Malawi team which claimed bronze medal at the 2016 Fast5 Netball World Series which was held in Melbourne. She was also a member of the Malawi side which finished last position at the 2014 Fast5 Netball World Series and 2017 Fast5 Netball World Series where Malawi lost all their matches in both tournaments. She was also part of the Malawi squad finished at fourth position at the 2018 Fast5 Netball World Series which was held in Melbourne.

She also took part in two Netball World Cup tournaments including the 2015 World Netball Championships and 2019 Netball World Cup where Malawi finished at sixth position in each occasions. She has also featured in Malawian squads for the 2018 African Netball Championships and 2019 African Netball Championships. She was named in Malawian netball squad for the women's netball tournament during the 2018 where Malawi finished at seventh position.

She was signed up to play for the Manchester Thunder at the British Fast5 All-Stars Championships which was held in October 2019. She was one of the three Malawian players alongside Loreen Ngwira and Joyce Mvula to play at the 2019 British Fast5 All-Stars Championships.

She was named in Malawian netball squad for the women's netball tournament at the 2022 Commonwealth Games.

National co-coaches Peace Chawinga-Kaluwa and Mary Waya announced a twelve-person squad for the 2025 Netball Nations Cup. They chose six new names and six experienced players who were Lwazi, Joyce Mvula, Towera Vinkhumbo, Grace Mwafulirwa-Mhango, Thandi Galeta and Martha Dambo.

In July 2026 she was New Zealander Debbie Fuller's choice for captain at the Commonwealth Games in Glasgow.

== Outside Netball ==
In 2016, she was appointed as the cervical cancer ambassador for Central Health Clinic in Malawi.
