= Olivia Tchine =

English international netball player (born 2000)

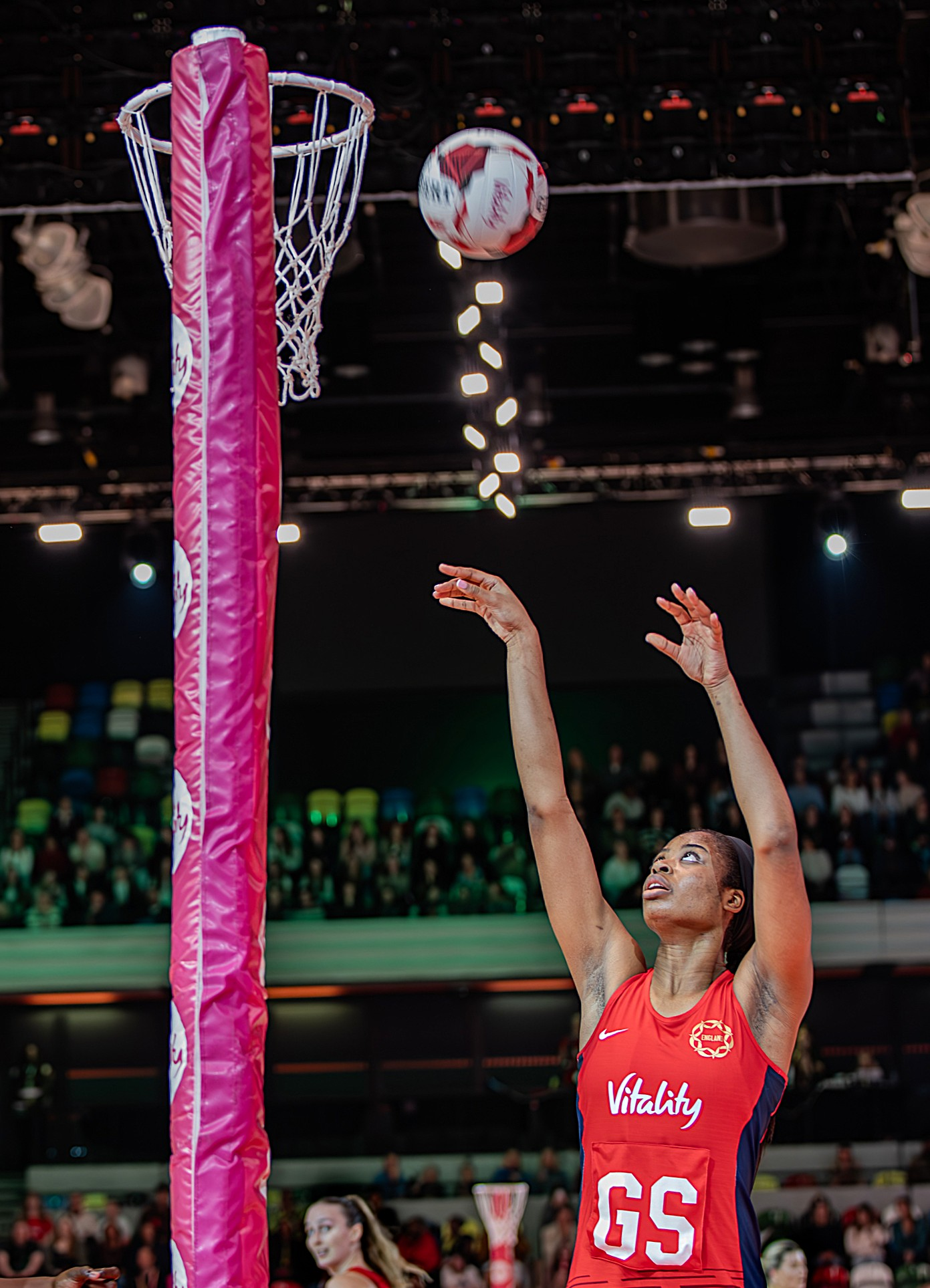

Personal information
- Full name: Assaindey Olivia Tchine
- Born: 22 November 2000 (age 25) South London
- Height: 1.91 m (6 ft 3 in)
- University: University of East London

Netball career
- Playing position: GS
Years	Club team	Apps
2019-present	London Pulse	
Years	National team	Caps
2022-present	England	29
Medal record
Representing England
Netball World Cup
Silver medal – second place	2023 Cape Town	Netball
- Updated on July 2025

Olivia Tchine (born 22 November 2000) is an English international netball player. She plays for London Pulse in the Netball Super League and is a member of the England national netball team.

== Early life and education ==
Tchine began playing netball at James Dixon Primary School, then more seriously as part of her first club Sabina. She studied at the University of Hertfordshire and later transferred to the University of East London where she graduated with a BSc in Sports Therapy in 2025.

== Club career ==
=== London Pulse ===
Tchine is a product of the London Pulse pathway and made her senior debut for the club in the 2019 Super League season. She helped Pulse reach the 2023 Super League final however they lost to Loughborough Lightning. Tchine helped the side win their first Super League Grand final in 2025, defeating Loughborough Lightning 53-45. In 2026 Tchine reached a third Super League Grand final but lost to Manchester Thunder in the final.

== International career ==
Tchine has played for England's age group teams throughout her career including as part of the winning U17 and U21 Europe Netball Championships sides in 2017 and 2018.

She was part of the Futures programme before making her senior debut in 2022 against Uganda. Tchine was part of the squad that secured a historic Silver Medal at the 2023 Netball World Cup in Cape Town.

She was named in the squad for the 2025 Netball Nations Cup and played in the final against South Africa where England won gold. She was named Player of the Series after a standout performance in the final saw her score 49 goals for England with 100% accuracy.

In June 2026 Tchine was selected into the 2026 Commonwealth Games team and named as vice-captain.

== Honours ==
=== England ===
- Netball World Cup: Silver: 2023
- Netball Nations Cup: 2025

=== London Pulse ===
- Netball Super League: 2025 Runners up: 2023, 2026
