= Connie Mhone =

Malawian netball player and coach (1968–2016)

Personal information
- Full name: Connie Mhone
- Born: July 9, 1968
- Died: January 11, 2016 (aged 47) Lilongwe
- Occupations: clerk, coach
- Height: 1.7 m (5 ft 7 in)

Netball career
- Playing positions: GA, GS
Years	Club team	Apps
- Civonets
Years	National team	Caps
- Malawi
- Updated on 16 June 2011

Connie Mhone (July 9, 1968 – January 11, 2016) was a Malawian netball player and netball coach for the Under 21 team.
