= Loreen Ngwira =

Malawian netball player

Personal information
- Born: 25 May 1993 (age 33) Blantyre, Malawi
- Occupation: netball player
- Height: 1.82 m (6 ft 0 in)

Netball career
- Playing positions: GD, GK
Years	Club team	Apps
- Team Northumbria
- Copper Box Arena
2019	London Pulse	
2020	Manchester Thunder	4

Loreen Ngwira also spelt as Laureen Ngwira (born 25 May 1993) is a Malawian netball player who plays for Malawi in the positions of GD and GK.

== Career ==
Loreen has represented Malawi at the Commonwealth Games in 2014 and 2018 where Malawi finished at fifth and seventh positions respectively. She also took part in two Netball World Cup tournaments including the 2015 World Netball Championships and 2019 Netball World Cup where Malawi finished at sixth position in each occasions.

She was part of the Malawian squad which finished at fifth position at the 2012 Fast5 Netball World Series. She was part of the Malawi team which finished at fifth position at the 2013 Fast5 Netball World Series. In the same tournament, Malawi stunned England twice in the round robin match and in the playoff for the fifth place.

She was part of the Malawi team which claimed bronze medal at the 2016 Fast5 Netball World Series which was held in Melbourne. She was also a member of the Malawi side which finished last position at the 2014 Fast5 Netball World Series and 2017 Fast5 Netball World Series where Malawi lost all their matches in both tournaments. She was also part of the Malawi squad finished at fourth position at the 2018 Fast5 Netball World Series which was held in Melbourne.

She has also featured in Malawian squads for the 2018 African Netball Championships and 2019 African Netball Championships.

She made her Netball Superleague debut for Team Northumbria in the 2018 Netball Superleague season and spent brief stint with the club before moving to Copper Box Arena. Laureen was shortlisted for the 2018 player of the season award by the Sky Sports in the Netball Superleague. She was signed by London Pulse prior to the 2019 Netball Superleague season for just one season with the club.

She was one of the three Malawian players alongside Takondwa Lwazi and Joyce Mvula to play at the 2019 British Fast5 All-Stars Championships representing Manchester Thunder. She was signed by Manchester Thunder prior to the 2020 Netball Superleague season and played in all four group stage matches representing Manchester Thunder during the 2020 Netball Superleague season. However, the 2020 season was officially cancelled due to the COVID-19 pandemic. She was re-signed by the Manchester Thunder for the 2021 Netball Superleague season but she was ruled out due to certain medical conditions and flew back to Malawi. She was also named in the All-Stars team to face England at the 2021 Netball Legends Series.
