= Martha Dambo =

Malawi netball player

Personal information
- Born: 28 September 1993 (age 33)
- Occupation: netball player

Netball career
- Playing position: goal defense

Martha Dambo (born 28 September 1993) is a Malawian netball player who plays for Malawi in the position of goal defense.

== Career ==
She was named in Malawi's squad for the 2013 Taini Jamison Trophy Series against New Zealand. She made her Commonwealth Games debut representing Malawi at the Commonwealth Games in 2018, where Malawi finished at seventh position.

She was included in the Malawian squad for the 2019 African Netball Championships. She was also named in Malawian netball squad for the women's netball tournament at the 2022 Commonwealth Games. She was included in the Malawian squad for the 2023 Netball World Cup, which was also her maiden appearance at a Netball World Cup tournament.

National co-coaches Peace Chawinga-Kaluwa and Mary Waya announced a twelve-person squad for the 2025 Netball Nations Cup. The chose six new names and six experienced players who were Dambo, Joyce Mvula, Takondwa Lwazi-Chiwaya, Towera Vinkhumbo, Grace Mwafulirwa-Mhango and Thandi Galeta.

In July 2026 she was chosen by New Zealander Debbie Fuller who was the national team's new coach at the Commonwealth Games in Glasgow.
