= Mwai Kumwenda =

Malawian netball player

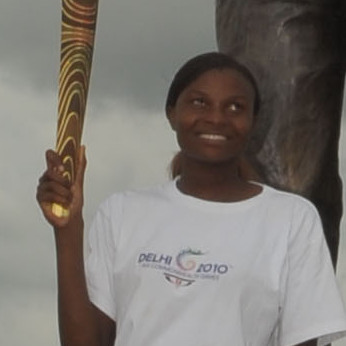

Personal information
- Full name: Mwai Jasinta Kumwenda^{(Note 1)}
- Born: 27 September 1989 (age 37) Mzimba, Malawi
- Height: 1.83 m (6 ft 0 in)
- Relative: ^{(Note 2)}

Netball career
- Playing positions: GS, GA
Years	Club team	Apps
200x–2011	Escom Sisters	
2011–2013	Peninsula Waves	
2013	Victorian Fury	
2014–2016	Mainland Tactix	
2015	→ Kukoma Diamonds	
2016–2023	Melbourne Vixens	
2017	→ Peninsula Waves	
2025	West Coast Fever	
Years	National team	Caps
2008–	Malawi	71
Medal record
Representing Malawi
Fast5 World Series
Bronze medal – third place	2016 Melbourne	Team

Mwai Kumwenda^{(Note 1)} (born 27 September 1989) is a Malawi netball international player. She represented Malawi at the 2010, 2014, 2018 and 2026 Commonwealth Games and at the 2011 and 2015 Netball World Cups. Kumwenda was the top goal scorer at three successive major tournaments – the 2014 Commonwealth Games, the 2015 Netball World Cup and the 2018 Commonwealth Games. At the 2015 Netball World Cup she was also named player of the tournament. Kumwenda captained Malawi and was again tournament top scorer when they finished third at the 2016 Fast5 Netball World Series. At club level Kumwenda has played for Peninsula Waves in the Victorian Netball League, Victorian Fury in the Australian Netball League, Mainland Tactix in the ANZ Championship and for Melbourne Vixens and West Coast Fever in Super Netball.

== Early life and family ==
Kumwenda is the daughter of Kennedy and Costa Kumwenda. She was raised in Mtwalo, a village in the Mzimba District. She is an ethnic Tumbuka and is the youngest of eight siblings. She has three brothers and three sisters.^{(Note 2)} A fourth sister died and her father, Kennedy, died when she was young. She began playing netball in primary school. Kumwenda later described her early experiences playing the game.

"For balls, we used plastic bags and put them under the fire to melt, then moulded them with our hands and tied them with string. For the goal posts, we cut down trees, like the ones outside. The goal rings were made from old tyres, like the ones on cars".

Kumwenda continued playing netball in secondary school and came to the attention of Griffin Sayenda, the Malawi national netball team coach. When Kumwenda was just fifteen, and with the encouragement of Sayenda, she moved to Blantyre to pursue a netball career.

== Playing career ==
=== Escom Sisters ===
In Malawi, Kumwenda played for Escom Sisters. They were later renamed Kukoma Diamonds. While playing in Australia and New Zealand, Kumwenda has also played for the Sisters and/or Diamonds on return visits to Malawi.

=== Peninsula Waves ===
Between 2011 and 2013 Kumwenda played for Peninsula Waves in the Victorian Netball League. While playing for Malawi at the 2009 Netball World Youth Cup, Kumwenda came to the attention of Waves coach, Maxine Wauchope. She was subsequently invited to play for Waves but, due to visa complications, she did not arrive at the club until 2011. In 2012 she shared the league's MVP award, the Margaret Caldow Trophy, with Helen Barclay and Caitlyn Strachan. She helped Waves reach the 2013 VNL grand final. Kumwenda returned to play for Waves during the 2017 season.

=== Victorian Fury ===
In 2013, together with Elle Bennetts, Kate Moloney and Fiona Themann, Kumwenda was a member of the Victorian Fury team that won the Australian Netball League title. She was the top goalscorer for Fury, finishing the season with a record 461 goals. In the grand final against NSW Waratahs she scored 38 goals with a 97% strike rate. She was subsequently named both the Fury and ANL MVP for 2013.

=== Mainland Tactix ===
Between 2014 and 2016 Kumwenda played for Mainland Tactix in the ANZ Championship. She replaced Joanne Harten as Tactix's import player. In 2014 she finished the season as ANZ Championship top scorer and she was also named the ANZ Championship Best New Talent. In 2016 she was named the Tactix MVP.

=== Melbourne Vixens ===
In 2016 Kumwenda signed for Melbourne Vixens of Super Netball. On 29 July 2018, during a Round 13 match against West Coast Fever, Kumwenda ruptured her anterior cruciate ligament. Kumwenda missed the early part of the 2019 season but made a comeback against Fever in Round 11. She was subsequently re-signed by Vixens for the 2020 season.

=== West Coast Fever ===
Following the birth of her child, Kumwenda was unavailable for play during the 2024 season. She signed with West Coast Fever in 2025, as a replacement player for Jhaniele Fowler-Nembhard. Kumwenda played in the first two fixtures of the season. Following Fowler-Nembhard's return to the side, Kumwenda was retained by the Fever as a training partner.

=== Malawi ===
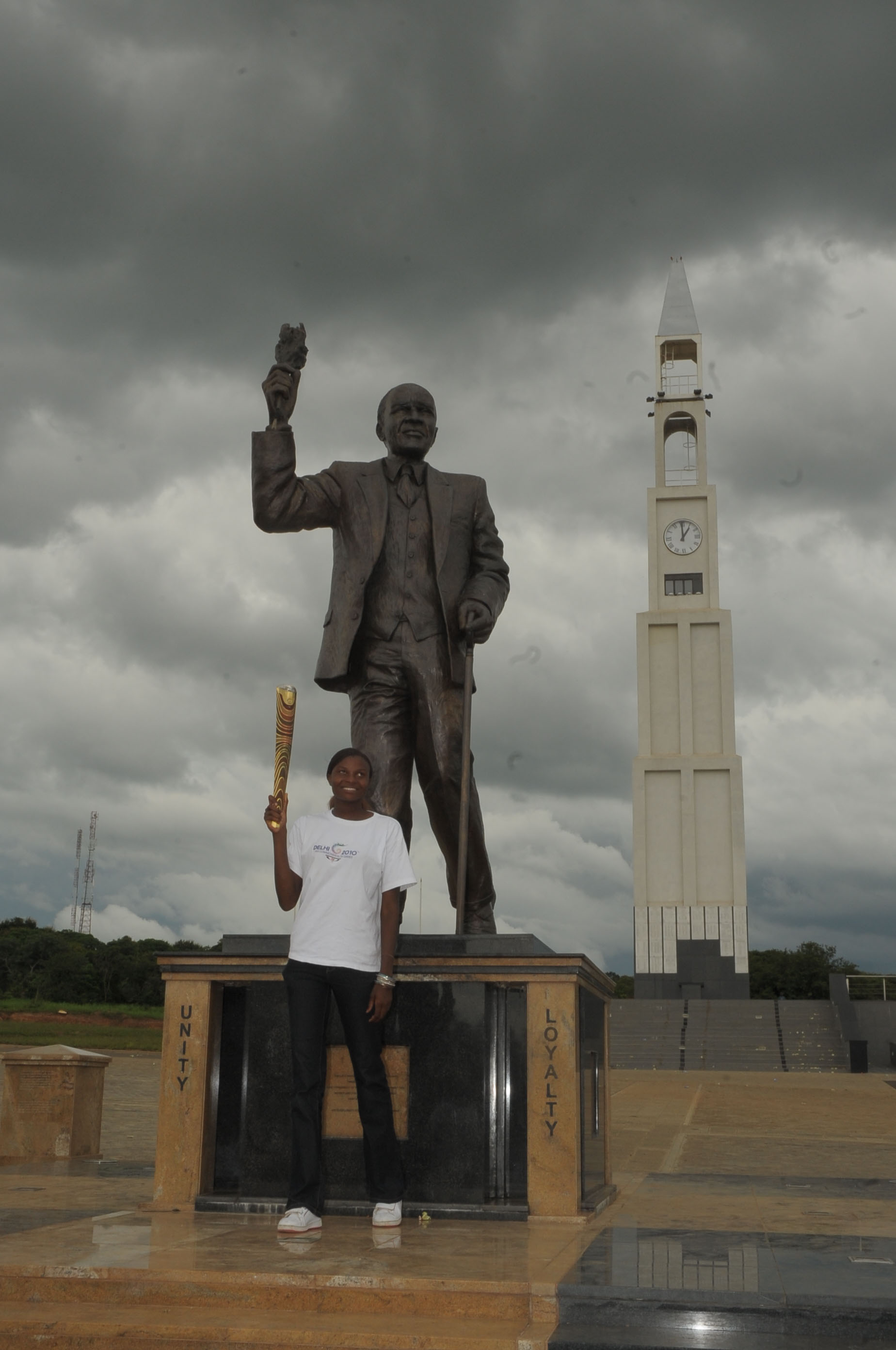
22 January 2010; Mwai Kumwenda in front of a statue of Hastings Banda, the former Prime Minister and President of Malawi

In April 2008 Kumwenda played for Malawi in an away series against England. In August 2009 she was tournament top scorer at the 2009 Netball World Youth Cup. She subsequently represented Malawi at the 2010, 2014 and 2018 Commonwealth Games and at the 2011 and 2015 Netball World Cups. Kumwenda was the top goal scorer at three successive major tournaments – the 2014 Commonwealth Games, the 2015 Netball World Cup, and the 2018 Commonwealth Games. At the 2015 Netball World Cup she was also named Player of the Tournament. At the 2018 Commonwealth Games she scored 41 goals as she helped Malawi defeat New Zealand 57–53. Kumwenda was again tournament top scorer when Malawi finished third at the 2016 Fast5 Netball World Series.

Kumwenda missed the 2014 and 2017 Fast5 Netball World Series tournaments following disputes with the Netball Association of Malawi. These disputes have resulted in interventions by Grace Chiumia, Malawi's Minister of Sports. She missed the 2019 Netball World Cup because of injury.

In July 2026 she was chosen by New Zealander Debbie Fuller who was the national team's new coach to play at the Commonwealth Games in Glasgow.

Tournaments	Place
2009 Netball World Youth Cup	5th
2009 World Netball Series	5th
2010 World Netball Series	5th
2010 Commonwealth Games	5th
2011 World Netball Championships	6th
2012 Diamond Challenge	2nd
2012 Fast5 Netball World Series	5th
2013 Taini Jamison Trophy Series	2nd
2013 Fast5 Netball World Series	5th
2014 Commonwealth Games	5th
2015 Netball World Cup	6th
2016 Fast5 Netball World Series	3rd place, bronze medalist(s)
2018 Taini Jamison Trophy Series	3rd
2018 Commonwealth Games	7th

== Honours ==
Melbourne Vixens

- Super Netball
  - Winners: 2020

Victorian Fury

- Australian Netball League
  - Winners: 2013

Individual Awards

Year	Award
2012	Margaret Caldow Trophy
2013	Australian Netball League MVP
2014	ANZ Championship top scorer
2014	ANZ Championship Best New Talent
2015	World Cup Player of the Tournament
2016	International World Games Association Athlete of the Year
2017	GS in Super Netball Team of the Year
2020	Super Netball Grand Final Most Valuable Player

== Notes ==
- ^1 Various sources also spell Kumwenda's first name as either Mwaŵi or Mwayi. On her Facebook and Instagram accounts she uses Mwai. Her native name in Chitumbuka is Mwaŵi, and the translation in Chichewa is Mwai, also spelt Mwayi.
- ^2 Some sources suggest that Mwai (b. 1989) and Bridget Kumwenda (b. 1991) are sisters. However, in interviews Mwai Kumwenda has stated she is the youngest sibling in her family. None of the interviews mention Bridget being a sister.
