= Sindi Simtowe =

Malawian netball player (born 1987)

Personal information
- Born: 27 July 1987 (age 38) Karonga, Malawi
- Occupation: netball player
- Height: 1.70 m (5 ft 7 in)

Netball career
- Playing position(s): goal attack, goal shooter
Medal record
Representing Malawi
Fast5 World Series
Bronze medal – third place	2016 Melbourne	Fast5

Sindi Simtowe (born 27 July 1987) is a Malawian netball player who plays for Malawi in the positions of goal attack or goal shooter. She was in three consecutive World Cup tournaments for Malawi in 2011, 2015 and in 2019. She has also represented Malawi at the Commonwealth Games in 2010, 2014 and in 2018.

She was also a member of the Malawian team that won the bronze medal at the 2016 Fast5 Netball World Series in Melbourne, defeating England in the third place playoff.
