= Joanna Kachilika =

Malawian netball player (born 1984)

Personal information
- Born: 8 June 1984 (age 42)
- Occupations: netball player, coach
- Height: 1.75 m (5 ft 9 in)

Netball career
- Playing positions: wing defense, goal defense

Joanna Kachilika (born 8 June 1984) has been a Malawian netball player, team captain and coach of the Malawi national team. She plays in the positions of goal defense or wing defense. She has featured in two World Cup tournaments for Malawi in 2011 and in 2019. She has also competed at the Commonwealth Games on three successive occasions in 2010, 2014 and in 2018 representing Malawi.

In September 2019, she was included in the Malawian squad to lead the team for the 2019 African Netball Championships.

She was one of only six people who had the Africa Level One Certificate in coaching and in January 2024 she was named as Malawi's National Team Coach. She took over following an eight-month hiatus after the dismissal of Peace Chawinga-Kaluwa. Her assistant was to be Eleanor Mapulanga and Beatrice Mpinganjira was the trainer. She was chosen because of her commitment but also because there was no regular wage associated with the position because of funding shortfalls. In November 2024 she was replaced. This time the choice was to have co-coaches for the national team of Peace Chawinga-Kaluwa and Mary Waya. Chawinga-Kaluwa had previously been the Malawian coach and Waya had been the national coach for Namibia.

Kachilika was not consulted and she was offered the position of under-21 coach. She refused this position and the NAM General Secrerary, Yamikana Kauma, said that they were looking to find someone to fill that vacancy. Meanwhile, Kachilika had instructed her lawyers and they were trying to resolve the impasse.
