= Joyce Mvula =

Malawian netball player (born 1994)

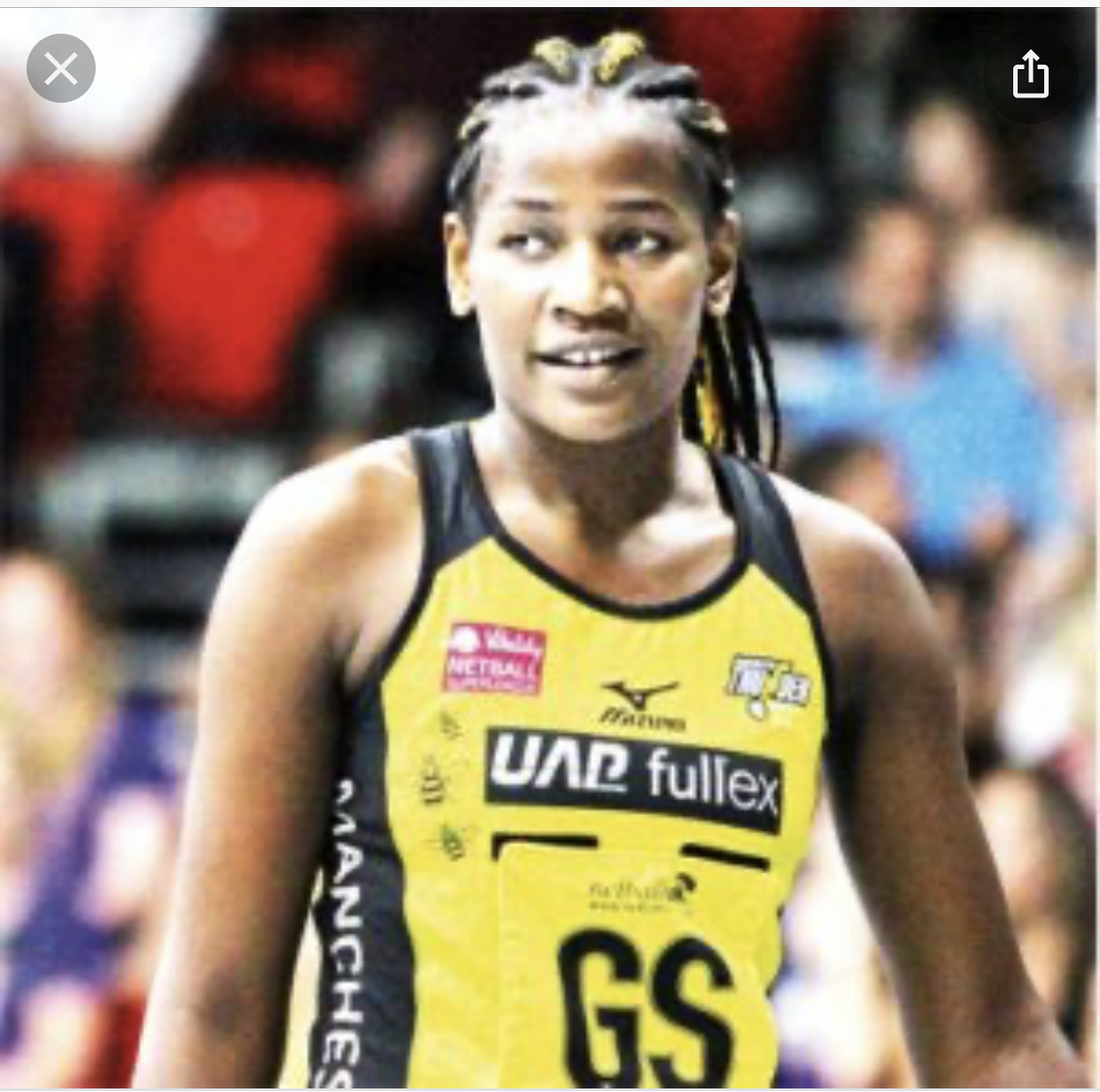
- in 2018

Personal information
- Born: 15 April 1994 (age 32) David Momba Village, Mzimba, Malawi
- Height: 183 cm (6 ft 0 in)

Netball career
- Playing position: GS
Years	Club team	Apps
2017-2022	Manchester Thunder	
2022-2023	Central Pulse	
2023	Leeds Rhinos	
Years	National team	Caps

Joyce Mvula (born 15 April 1994) is a Malawian netball player and winner of two Netball Superleague titles. She was selected to represent Malawi at the 2015, 2019, 2023 and 2025 Netball World Cups.

== Domestic career ==
Mvula started playing netball at age 13 and became the first Malawian to play in the Netball Superleague after she was picked up by Manchester Thunder following the Netball World Cup in 2015. She has paved the way for a number of Malawian players to join the Superleague.

Mvula played for Manchester Thunder for six years from 2017 until 2022, winning titles in 2019 and 2022. She was one of the three Malawian players alongside Loreen Ngwira and Takondwa Lwazi to play at the 2019 British Fast5 All-Stars Championships. She was named Sky Sports Fan's Favourite Player of the Season in 2019. Mvula was named in the Netball Superleague All Stars team who played a series against England Netball in January 2021.

After her role in Thunder's unbeaten and grand final winning season in 2022, during which Mvula scored 774 goals, she announced she would be leaving to play in another country. Her long time coach Karen Greig said "Whilst I am disappointed that we lose Joyce, I am so proud of her that she is getting the opportunity to show how amazing she is overseas. It's been a real honour to have been part of her netball journey and I wish her all the luck in the world."

Mvula signed for Central Pulse in New Zealand ahead of the 2023 ANZ Premiership season. She made her Netball Superleague return in 2024, joining her former teammate and now coach Liana Leota at Leeds Rhinos.

== International career ==
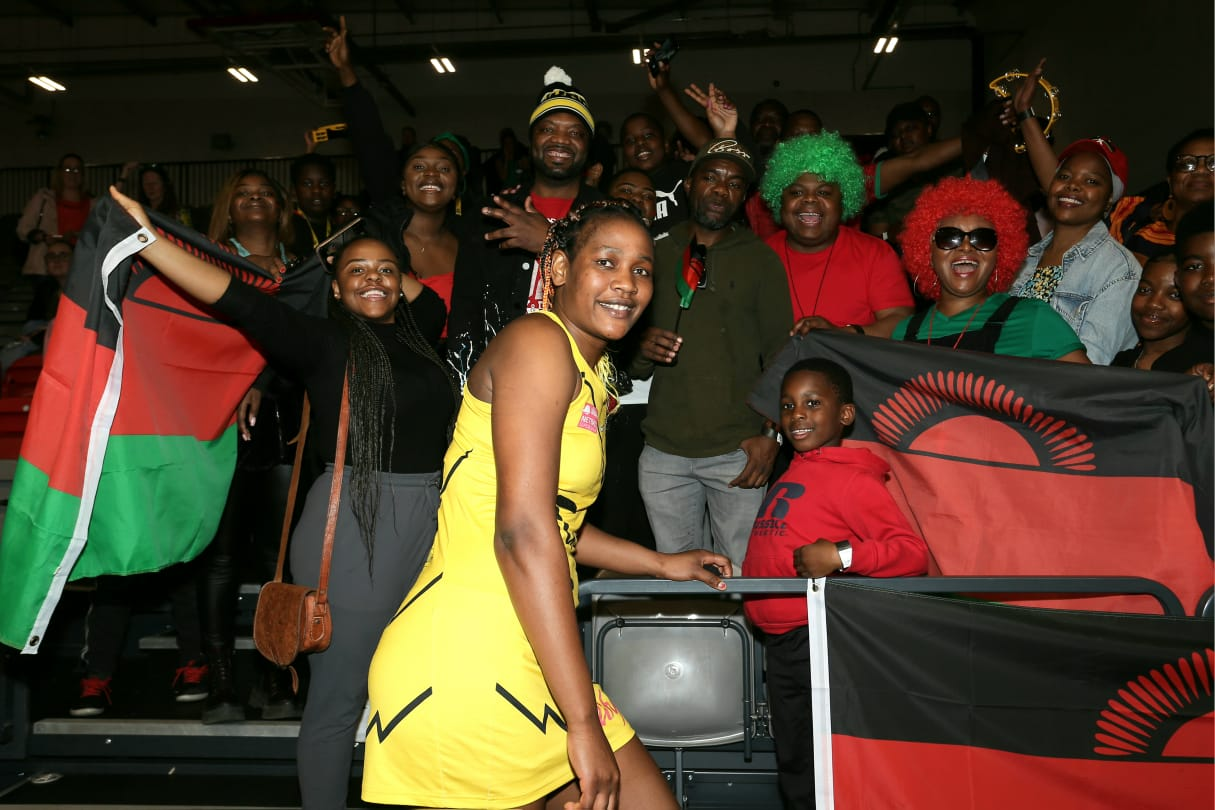
Joyce Mvula with some Malawian fans in Manchester

Mvula was selected for the Malawi netball team (the Malawi Queens) in 2010, representing her country at the 2014 Commonwealth Games. She was selected to represent Malawi at the 2015, 2019 and 2023 Netball World Cups. She was Malawi's top scorer at the 2023 World Cup.

National co-coaches Peace Chawinga-Kaluwa and Mary Waya announced a twelve-person squad for the 2025 Netball Nations Cup. They chose six new names and six experienced players who were Mvula, Takondwa Lwazi-Chiwaya, Towera Vinkhumbo, Grace Mwafulirwa-Mhango, Thandie Galleta and Martha Dambo.

== Personal life ==
Mvula started playing netball at primary school before joining Blue Eagles netball club. She was a member of the Malawi Police Service. She married in December 2022 and has a son. Her son was born in about 2015 and after four months Mvulu's mother took care of him. Mvulu earned the money but it was her mother who took care of Sangwani day to day. Sangwani joined her in the UK in 2024.
