= Malawi at the Commonwealth Games =

- CGF code: MAW
- CGA: Olympic and Commonwealth Games Association of Malawi
- Medals Ranked 57th: Gold 0 Silver 0 Bronze 3 Total 3

Commonwealth Games appearances (overview)
- 1970; 1974; 1978; 1982; 1986; 1990; 1994; 1998; 2002; 2006; 2010; 2014; 2018; 2022; 2026; 2030

Other related appearances
- Rhodesia and Nyasaland (1962)

Malawi have participated in twelve Commonwealth Games, attending every one from 1970 onwards. They have won only three medals, all bronze and all in boxing.

Malawi (then known as Nyasaland) was part of Rhodesia and Nyasaland when Rhodesia and Nyasaland competed in 1962.

== Medals ==
Games	Gold	Silver	Bronze	Total
1970 Edinburgh	0	0	1	1
1974 Christchurch	0	0	0	0
1978 Edmonton	0	0	0	0
1982 Brisbane	0	0	0	0
1986 Edinburgh	0	0	2	2
1990 Auckland	0	0	0	0
1994 Victoria	0	0	0	0
1998 Kuala Lumpur	0	0	0	0
2002 Manchester	0	0	0	0
2006 Melbourne	0	0	0	0
2010 Delhi	0	0	0	0
2014 Glasgow	0	0	0	0
2018 Gold Coast	0	0	0	0
2022 Birmingham	0	0	0	0
Total	0	0	3	3

== List of Medalists ==
Malawi has won a total of three medals at the Commonwealth Games, all of them being bronze. Their first medal was at the 1970.

Medal	Name	Games	Sport	Event
Bronze	Tatu Ghionga	1970 Edinburgh	Boxing	Men's lightweight
Bronze	Lyton Mphande	1986 Edinburgh	Boxing	Men's lightweight
Bronze	Solomon Kondowe	1986 Edinburgh	Boxing	Men's light welterweight
