= Caroline Mtukule =

Malawian netball player (born 1989)

Personal information
- Born: 15 October 1989 (age 36)
- Occupation: Netball player
- Height: 1.74 m (5 ft 9 in)

Netball career
- Playing positions: Goal defence, goal keeper
Years	Club team	Apps
2023	Team Bath Netball	
Years	National team	Caps
2006 to present	Malawi	

Caroline Mtukule (born 15 October 1989) is a Malawian netball player who plays for Malawi in the positions of goal defence or goal keeper. She has featured in four consecutive World Cup tournaments for Malawi in 2011, 2015 and in 2019. She has also competed at the Commonwealth Games on four successive occasions in 2010, 2014, 2018 and 2022 representing Malawi.

In 2023 Mtukule joined Netball Super League club Team Bath Netball in England.
