= Malawi national netball team =

Netball team

Malawi
- Nickname(s): Queens
- Association: Netball Association of Malawi
- Confederation: Africa Netball
- Captain: Jane Chimaliro
- World ranking: 6 ▲
Team colours	Alternate

Netball World Cup
- 2019 placing: 6th
- Best result: 5th (2007)

Commonwealth Games
- 2018 placing: 7th
- Best result: 5th (2010), (2014)

The Malawi national netball team, nicknamed "The Queens", represent Malawi in international netball competitions.

== History ==
Malawi have played in six World Netball Championships, famously finishing fifth in 2007.

In 2012 they competed in the Fast5 tournament in Auckland, where they have had several historic results including wins over Australia and England, and finished in 5th place, just narrowly missing out on the finals. This followed a draw against Australia in the 2010 Edition. Airtel Malawi is a significant financial donor of the Malawi Queens, having sponsored their trip to Auckland for the Fast5 World Series in 2014 to a sum of K6 M. The current Netball Association of Malawi (NAM) president is independent politician Abigail Shariff. She was elected to replace Khungekile Matiya in 2021.

At the 2018 Commonwealth Games, Malawi defeated the second-ranked team in the world, New Zealand, for the first time in history.

In November 2022, the team were sixth on the World Netball Rankings. Malawi competed at the Commonwealth Games, in Birmingham. By virtue of its position in the World Netball Rankings, Malawi qualified for the tournament. Fixtures were announced in November 2021, then updated with the remaining qualifiers in March 2022. Malawi finished fourth in their group at the competition behind hosts England, New Zealand and Uganda.

In 2022 Abigail Shariff and Minister of Youth and Sports, Richard Chimwendo Banda, persuaded Monica Chakwera, the first lady of Malawi. to become the patron of the national netball team. Shariff believed that the first lady would be able to assist with the team's problems. The team was suffering from a lack of funding particularly for domestic matches. In May 2024 Shariff and the rest of the executive committee of the national netball team resigned. The Sports Council were obliged to step in to provide support until a new committee can be appointed.

In 2023, Malawi took part in the Netball World Cup in Cape Town. Malawi finished second in Group B, winning matches against Scotland and Barbados to qualify for the second round. In the second round in Group F, Malawi won further matches against Tonga and Fiji and finished third in the group behind England and Australia, thus failing to proceed to the knockout section of the tournament. Following placement matches, Malawi finished 7th in the tournament. Joyce Mvula was the team's highest goal scorer, and the fourth highest overall in the tournament, with 194 goals.

The Malawian financial services group, NICO Holdings, sponsored the Malawi national netball team in 2025/26. At the end of the first year, in January 2026, they said that they would continue including underwriting international competitions including that years Commonwealth Games in Scotland.

== Players ==
=== 2023 Netball World Cup Roster ===
Jane Chimaliro (Captain), Martha Dambo, Thandi Galeta, Mwai Kumwenda, Takondwa Lwazi, Madalitso Mkandawire, Caroline Mtukule, Joyce Mvula, Grace Mwafulirwa, Lauren Ngwira, Sindi Simtowe, Towera Vinkhumbo.

Reserves: Shabel Bengo, Salome Nkhom, Mma Lepona Manyonyoba

Coach: Sam Kanyenda

=== Notable past players ===
- Mary Waya
- Connie Mhone

== Coaches include ==
The Queens have been coached by Peace Chawinga-Kaluwa. She replaced Whyte Mlilima, who was appointed as caretaker head coach after former coach late Griffin Saenda had to withdraw from the team on medical grounds in 2018.

Joanna Kachilika was one of only six people who had the Africa Level One Certificate in coaching and in January 2024 she was named as Malawi's National Team Coach. She took over following an eight month hiatus after the dismissal of Peace Chawinga-Kaluwa. Her assistant was to be Eleanor Mapulanga and Beatrice Mpinganjira was the trainer. She was chosen because of her commitment but also because there was no regular wage associated with the position because of funding shortfalls. In November 2024 she was replaced. This time the choice was to have co-coaches for the national team of Peace Chawinga-Kaluwa and Mary Waya. Chawinga-Kaluwa had previously been the Malawian coach and Waya had been the national coach for Namibia.

Kachilika was not consulted and she was offered the position of under-21 coach. She refused this position and the NAM General Secrerary, Yamikana Kauma, understood that Kachilika had instructed her lawyers and they were trying to resolve the impasse.

In July 2026 New Zealander Debbie Fuller was the new coach at the Commonwealth Games in Glasgow. Her squad were Takondwa Lwazi, Martha Danbo, Mphatso Banda, Aisha Gama, Florence Jeke, Ethel Ng'ambi, Sophilet Banda, Tendai Masamba, Mwawi Kumwenda, Stella Matelezi, Melia Soko and Shabel Bengo.

== Competitive history ==
Netball World Cup
Year	Championship	Location	Placing
1995	9th World Championships	Birmingham, England	8th
1999	10th World Championships	Christchurch, New Zealand	11th
2003	11th World Championships	Kingston, Jamaica	DNQ
2007	12th World Championships	Auckland, New Zealand	5th
2011	13th World Championships	Singapore	6th
2015	14th World Cup	Sydney, Australia	6th
2019	15th World Cup	Liverpool, England	6th
2023	16th World Cup	Cape Town, South Africa	7th

Netball at the Commonwealth Games
Year	Games	Event	Location	Placing
2006	XVIII Games	3rd Netball	Melbourne, Australia	6th
2010	XIX Games	4th Netball	Delhi, India	5th
2014	XX Games	5th Netball	Glasgow, Scotland	5th
2018	XXI Games	6th Netball	Gold Coast, Australia	7th
2022	XXII Games	7th Netball	Birmingham, UK	7th
2026	XXIII Games	8th Netball	Glasgow, UK	7th

World Netball Series
Year	Championship	Location	Placing
2009	1st World Series	Manchester, England	5th
2010	2nd World Series	Manchester, England	5th
2011	3rd World Series	Liverpool, England	DNQ
2012	4th World Series	Auckland, New Zealand	5th
2013	5th World Series	Auckland, New Zealand	5th
2014	6th World Series	Auckland, New Zealand	6th
2016	7th World Series	Melbourne, Australia	3rd
2017	8th World Series	Melbourne, Australia	6th
2018	9th World Series	Melbourne, Australia	4th
2022	10th World Series	Melbourne, Australia	DNQ
