= Jane Chimaliro =

Malawian netball player (born 1985)

Personal information
- Born: 29 September 1985 (age 40)
- Occupation: netball player
- Height: 1.60 m (5 ft 3 in)

Netball career
- Playing positions: GA, WA

Jane Chimaliro (born 29 September 1985) is a clerk in the Malawian courts and a netball player who plays for Malawi in the positions of goal attack or wing attack.

== Life ==
Chimaliro was born in 1975 and she was the last child of four. She was educated in Mzuzu at Chibavi Community Day Secondary School and this is where she began to play netball. She played for local teams before she settled down in 2007 at Civonets Netball Club.

She began work with the Malawian judiciary in 2009 and in 2011 she was chosen to join the national netball team who are known as the Queens.

She has featured in two World Cup tournaments for Malawi in 2015 and in 2019. In 2018 the Queens beat the number one netball team, New Zealand, and Chiliro takes pride in being on that team. She has also competed at the Commonwealth Games on two successive occasions in 2014 and 2018 representing Malawi.

In 2023 she was the Queens' vice-captain and she spoke out concerning the payments that team members receive for representing Malawi. She complained that the payments had not been increased in over ten years. The Queens were a leading team and they had to train on a concrete surface as the stadium they used was not covered in asphalt which is the standard surface for international netball.
