= Towera Vinkhumbo =

Malawi netball and football international

Personal information
- Full name: Towera Angela Nyirenda (Née: Vinkhumbo)
- Born: 14 February 1991 (age 35) Blantyre, Malawi
- Height: 1.75 m (5 ft 9 in)

Netball career
- Playing positions: GD, GK
Years	Club team	Apps
2008–2012	Escom Sisters	
2012–2020	→ Kukoma Diamonds	
2019–	Severn Stars	
Years	National team	Caps
2010–	Malawi	
Medal record
Representing Malawi
Fast5 World Series
Bronze medal – third place	2016 Melbourne	Team

Towera Vinkhumbo (born 14 February 1991), also referred to as Towera Vinkhumbo-Nyirenda or Towera Nyirenda, is a Malawi netball international and a Malawi women's football international. As a netball player she represented Malawi at the 2010, 2014 and 2018 Commonwealth Games and at the 2011, 2015 and 2019 Netball World Cups. Vinkhumbo was also a member of the Malawi team that finished third at the 2016 Fast5 Netball World Series. At club level, Vinkhumbo plays for Strathclyde Sirens in the Netball Superleague. In July 2019, the same month she played for Malawi in the 2019 Netball World Cup, she also represented Malawi at the 2019 COSAFA Women's Football Championship. She also played for Malawi in the 2020 Summer Olympic football qualifiers.

== Early life and family ==
Vinkhumbo was born in Chitawira Private Hospital in Blantyre. She is the ninth-born of eleven children–six girls and five boys, three of whom died. Vinkhumbo began playing both netball and association football when she was in primary school. Several of her siblings also played both sports at a senior level. Her older brother, Aubrey Vinkhumbo, played football as a defender for Mighty Wanderers. Her sister, Salome Vinkhumbo, is also a Malawi women's football international and captained the team at the 2018 COSAFA Women's Championship.

== Netball ==
=== Club level ===
Escom Sisters/Kukoma Diamonds

In Malawi, Vinkhumbo played for Escom Sisters. She continued to play for the team when they were renamed Kukoma Diamonds. Two of her sisters, Lucy Vinkhumbo and Salome Vinkhumbo also played for the same team.

Severn Stars

Vinkhumbo signed for Severn Stars of the Netball Superleague ahead of the 2020 season.

Strathclyde Sirens

In February 2021 she made her first appearance for the Strathclyde Sirens who are based in Glasgow. The Sirens compete in the Sky Sports Televised, Vitality Netball Superleague and she signed for the whole year. However, because of COVID-19 the team were playing matches without any spectators. During the 2021 season she was said to be the fifth best Netball player tying with Samantha Wallace of Trinidad and Tobago in a poll by Netball Scoop.

=== Malawi ===
Vinkhumbo represented Malawi at the 2010, 2014 and 2018 Commonwealth Games and at the 2011, 2015 and 2019 Netball World Cups. At the 2018 Commonwealth Games she helped Malawi defeat New Zealand 57–53. Vinkhumbo was also a member of the Malawi team that finished third at the 2016 Fast5 Netball World Series.

Tournaments	Place
2009 Netball World Youth Cup	5th
2010 World Netball Series ?	5th
2010 Commonwealth Games	5th
2011 World Netball Championships	6th
2012 Diamond Challenge	2nd
2012 Fast5 Netball World Series	5th
2013 African Netball Championship	2nd
2013 Taini Jamison Trophy Series	2nd
2013 Fast5 Netball World Series	5th
2014 Commonwealth Games	5th
2014 Fast5 Netball World Series	6th
2015 Netball World Cup	6th
2016 Fast5 Netball World Series	3rd place, bronze medalist(s)
2018 Taini Jamison Trophy Series	3rd
2018 Commonwealth Games	7th
2018 Fast5 Netball World Series	4th
2019 Netball World Cup	6th
2019 Africa Netball Cup	
2023 Fast5 Netball World Series	6th
2025 Netball Nations Cup	4th

== Football ==
Towera Vinkhumbo
Personal information
- Position: Defender

Senior career*
Years	Team	Apps	(Gls)
- Mbawala Bush Bucks
- Blantyre Zero

International career
2004–	Malawi		
- * Club domestic league appearances and goals

=== Club level ===
In an interview with The Nation, Vinkhumbo recalls playing football with and against her sisters. Lucy Vinkhumbo played for Super Queens while Towera, Salome and Tamara Vinkhumbo all played for Mbawala Bush Bucks. When selected to play for Malawi in the 2019 COSAFA Women's Championship and in 2020 Summer Olympics qualifiers, Towera and Salome Vinkhumbo were playing for Blantyre Zero.

=== Malawi ===
Vinkhumbo originally played for Malawi in the early 2000s. Some reports suggest that she was a young as 10 or 14 when she made her senior debut. She went on to represent Malawi in COSAFA Women's Championship tournament and in Africa Women Cup of Nations qualifiers. However, in 2006 she lost her place in the team and she subsequently focused on her netball career. Thirteen years later she would make a comeback with the national team.

In July 2019 Vinkhumbo represented Malawi in both the 2019 Netball World Cup and at the 2019 COSAFA Women's Championship. The two sisters also played for Malawi in 2020 Summer Olympics qualifiers.

Tournaments	Round
2019 COSAFA Women's Championship	Group stage
2020 CAF Women's Olympic Qualifying Tournament	Second round
