= 2009 Netball Superleague Grand Final =

Netball Superleague grand final

- Event: 2008–09 Netball Superleague season
Team Bath	Galleria Mavericks
54	46
- Team Bath win their third grand final. Mavericks make their fourth successive grand final appearance.
- Date: 4 April 2009
- Venue: Coventry Skydome, Coventry
- Player of the Match: Pamela Cookey

The 2009 Netball Superleague Grand Final featured Team Bath and Galleria Mavericks. Having previously played each other in both the 2006 and 2007 grand finals, this was third final that featured Team Bath and Mavericks. This was Team Bath's third grand final and Mavericks fourth. As with the two previous encounters, it was Team Bath that emerged as winners. The Mavericks netted 46 of their 52 chances, while Team Bath claimed 54 from 62.

== Match summary ==
4 April 2009; 19:30	Team Bath	54–46	Galleria Mavericks	Coventry Skydome; Umpires: Gary Burgess and Judith Groves	Sky Sports
4 April 2009; 19:30	Scoring by quarter: 19–8, 29–20, 42–31, 54–46			Coventry Skydome; Umpires: Gary Burgess and Judith Groves	Sky Sports
4 April 2009; 19:30	Rachel Dunn 28/34 (82%); Pamela Cookey 26/28 (93%)		Louisa Brownfield 31/34 (91%); Ella Clark 15/18 (83%)	Coventry Skydome; Umpires: Gary Burgess and Judith Groves	Sky Sports

== Teams ==
Head Coach: Jess Garland; Assistant Coach: Anna Mayes Starting 7: GS Rachel Dunn; GA Pamela Cookey (c); WA Joanne Binns; C Serena Guthrie; WD Sara Bayman; GD Gemma Fletcher; GK Eboni Beckford-Chambers Substitutes: GS Rosie Allison; GS Kirsty Delves; WD/C Clare Elsley; GD/GK Samantha Perry; GA/GS Monique Wood Squad: WA/C Sasha Corbin; GK/WD/GK Stacey Francis; WA/GA Tamsin Greenway; GD/GK Geva Mentor	Head Coach: Kendra Slawinski Starting 7: GS Louisa Brownfield; GA Ella Clark; WA Gemma Wiseman; C Karen Atkinson (c); WD Steph Bello; GD Hazel Schofield; GK Nadia Hutchinson Substitutes: GA Michelle Hall; Camilla Buchanan; Chrissy Fitzgerald; Michaella McFarlane; Natalie Seaton
