= 2008 Taini Jamison Trophy Series =

International netball series

Tournament details
- Host country: New Zealand
- Dates: 13–18 October 2008

Final positions
- Champions: New Zealand (1st title)
- Runners-up: England

Tournament statistics
- Matches played: 3

The 2008 Taini Jamison Trophy Series, also referred to as the New World Series, was the inaugural Taini Jamison Trophy series. It featured New Zealand playing England in a series of three netball test matches, played in October 2008. New Zealand won the opening test 65–26. England leveled the series by winning the second test 40–38. New Zealand won the inaugural Taini Jamison Trophy series 2–1 by defeating England 61–22 in the final test. The New Zealand team was coached by Ruth Aitken and captained by Julie Seymour and Laura Langman. England were coached by Sue Hawkins and captained by Karen Atkinson.

== Squads ==
=== New Zealand ===
New Zealand roster
Players
Coaches

Name	Pos	DOB	Height	Club	Nat	Caps
Liana Barrett-Chase	C, WA	31 October 1984 (aged 23)	1.68 m (5 ft 6 in)	Southern Steel
Maree Bowden	WA, C	20 November 1979 (aged 28)	1.75 m (5 ft 9 in)	Canterbury Tactix
Leana de Bruin	GD, GK	9 July 1977 (aged 31)	1.90 m (6 ft 3 in)	Northern Mystics
Katrina Grant	GK, GD, WD	6 May 1987 (aged 21)	1.87 m (6 ft 2 in)	Southern Steel
Paula Griffin	GS, GA	11 July 1988 (aged 20)	1.85 m (6 ft 1 in)	Northern Mystics
Joline Henry	GD, WD	29 September 1982 (aged 26)	1.83 m (6 ft 0 in)	Waikato Bay of Plenty Magic
Laura Langman^{1} (c)	C, WD	16 April 1986 (aged 22)	1.73 m (5 ft 8 in)	Waikato Bay of Plenty Magic
Sheryl Scanlan	GD, WD	8 September 1977 (aged 31)	1.78 m (5 ft 10 in)	Northern Mystics
Julie Seymour^{1} (c)	C, WD	29 March 1971 (aged 37)	1.71 m (5 ft 7 in)	Canterbury Tactix
Maria Tutaia	GA, GS	18 February 1987 (aged 21)	1.88 m (6 ft 2 in)	Northern Mystics
Irene van Dyk	GS, GA	21 June 1972 (aged 36)	1.90 m (6 ft 3 in)	Waikato Bay of Plenty Magic
Casey Williams	GD, GK	19 June 1985 (aged 23)	1.88 m (6 ft 2 in)	Waikato Bay of Plenty Magic
Daneka Wipiiti	GS	8 December 1982 (aged 25)	1.94 m (6 ft 4 in)	Southern Steel

Head coach

- Ruth Aitken

Assistant coach

- Waimarama Taumaunu

Notes

- (c) – Captain
- (cc) – Co-captain
- (vc) – Vice-captain
- – Injury / maternity leave
- (TRP) – Temporary Replacement Player

Notes

- ^1 Julie Seymour captained New Zealand for the first two tests. After she was injured, Laura Langman was captain for the third test.

=== England ===
England roster
Players
Coaches

Name	Pos	DOB	Height	Club	Nat	Caps
Ama Agbeze	GD, GK, WD	31 October 1984 (aged 23)	1.84 m (6 ft 0 in)	Leeds Carnegie
Karen Atkinson (c)	WA, C	7 June 1978 (aged 30)	1.68 m (5 ft 6 in)	Hertfordshire Mavericks
Sara Bayman	C, WA, WD	23 December 1984 (aged 23)	1.81 m (5 ft 11 in)	Team Bath
Joanna Binns	WA, C	6 September 1984 (aged 24)	1.73 m (5 ft 8 in)	Team Bath
Louisa Brownfield	GS, GA	14 April 1984 (aged 24)	1.91 m (6 ft 3 in)	Hertfordshire Mavericks
Jade Clarke	WD, C, WA	17 October 1983 (aged 24)	1.74 m (5 ft 9 in)	Loughborough Lightning
Pamela Cookey	GA, GS, WA	2 September 1984 (aged 24)	1.78 m (5 ft 10 in)	Team Bath
Sasha Corbin	WA, C	23 April 1988 (aged 20)	1.70 m (5 ft 7 in)	Team Bath
Rachel Dunn	GS, GA	14 November 1982 (aged 25)	1.87 m (6 ft 2 in)	Team Bath
Naida Hutchinson	GK, GD, WD		–	Hertfordshire Mavericks
Geva Mentor	GK, GD, WD	17 September 1984 (aged 24)	1.91 m (6 ft 3 in)	Adelaide Thunderbirds
Sonia Mkoloma	GD, GK	17 January 1979 (aged 29)	1.86 m (6 ft 1 in)	Central Pulse

Head coach

- Sue Hawkins

Assistant coach

- Anna Mayes

Notes

- (c) – Captain
- (cc) – Co-captain
- (vc) – Vice-captain
- – Injury / maternity leave
- (TRP) – Temporary Replacement Player

== Matches ==
=== First test ===
13 October 2008	New Zealand	65–26	England	Vector Arena
13 October 2008	Scoring by quarter: 16–7, 30–12, 47–18, 65–26			Vector Arena
13 October 2008	Irene van Dyk 38/40 (95%); Maria Tutaia 88% Daneka Wipiiti 63%		Louisa Brownfield 79% Pamela Cookey 3/10 (30%); Rachel Dunn 100%	Vector Arena

=== Second test ===
15 October 2008	New Zealand	38–40	England	Edgar Centre
15 October 2008	Scoring by quarter: 9–9, 17–21, 29–30, 38–40			Edgar Centre
15 October 2008	Irene van Dyk 18/23 (78%); Maria Tutaia 5/8 (63%); Daneka Wipiiti 15/23 (65%)		Louisa Brownfield 24/32 (75%); Pamela Cookey 16/23 (70%)	Edgar Centre

=== Third test ===
18 October 2008	New Zealand	61–22	England	Arena Manawatu
18 October 2008	Irene van Dyk 41/41 (100%); Maria Tutaia; Daneka Wipiiti; Paula Griffin		Louisa Brownfield; Pamela Cookey; Rachel Dunn	Arena Manawatu
