= 2005–06 Netball Superleague season =

Netball Superleague season

- League: Netball Superleague
- Teams: 8
- Champions: Team Bath
- Runners-up: Galleria Mavericks

Seasons
- ← 2005 2006–07 →

The 2005–06 Netball Superleague season (known for sponsorship reasons as the figleaves.com Netball Superleague) was the inaugural season of the new Netball Superleague which replaced the Super Cup as the top level netball competition in England. The inaugural champions were Team Bath, who defeated Galleria Mavericks in the grand final.

== Overview ==
The Netball Superleague replaced the Super Cup as the top level netball competition in England. Four of the six Super Cup teams – Brunel Hurricanes, Northern Thunder, Team Bath and Team Northumbria – were joined by four new teams – Celtic Dragons, Galleria Mavericks, Leeds Carnegie and Loughborough Lightning – to become the eight founder members of the Netball Superleague. The season started in October 2005 and concluded in June 2006. Its main sponsor was figleaves.com. With a squad that included Pamela Cookey, Rachel Dunn, Stacey Francis, Jess Garland, Tamsin Greenway and Geva Mentor, Team Bath won the inaugural Netball Superleague title.

== Teams ==
2005–06 Superleague teams	Home venue/base	Country/Region
Brunel Hurricanes	Brunel University London	Greater London/South East England
Celtic Dragons	Welsh Institute of Sport	Wales
Galleria Mavericks	University of Hertfordshire	East of England
Leeds Met Carnegie	Leeds Metropolitan University	Yorkshire
Loughborough Lightning	Loughborough University	East Midlands
Northern Thunder	Bury, Greater Manchester	North West England
Team Bath	University of Bath	South West England/West of England
Team Northumbria	Gateshead Leisure Centre	North East England

== Grand final ==
10 June 2006	Team Bath	43–35	Galleria Mavericks	Guildford Spectrum; Umpires: Bill Alexander and Margaret Deighan
10 June 2006	Scoring by quarter: 10–8, 22–15, 32–22, 43–35			Guildford Spectrum; Umpires: Bill Alexander and Margaret Deighan
10 June 2006	Rachel Dunn 29/34 (85%); Pamela Cookey 14/28 (50%)		Lynsey Armitage 15/18 (83%); Louisa Brownfield 13/19 (68%); Ann Marie Muller 4/8 (50%); Heather Clarke 3/6 (50%)	Guildford Spectrum; Umpires: Bill Alexander and Margaret Deighan
