= Louisa Brownfield =

England netball international (born 1984)

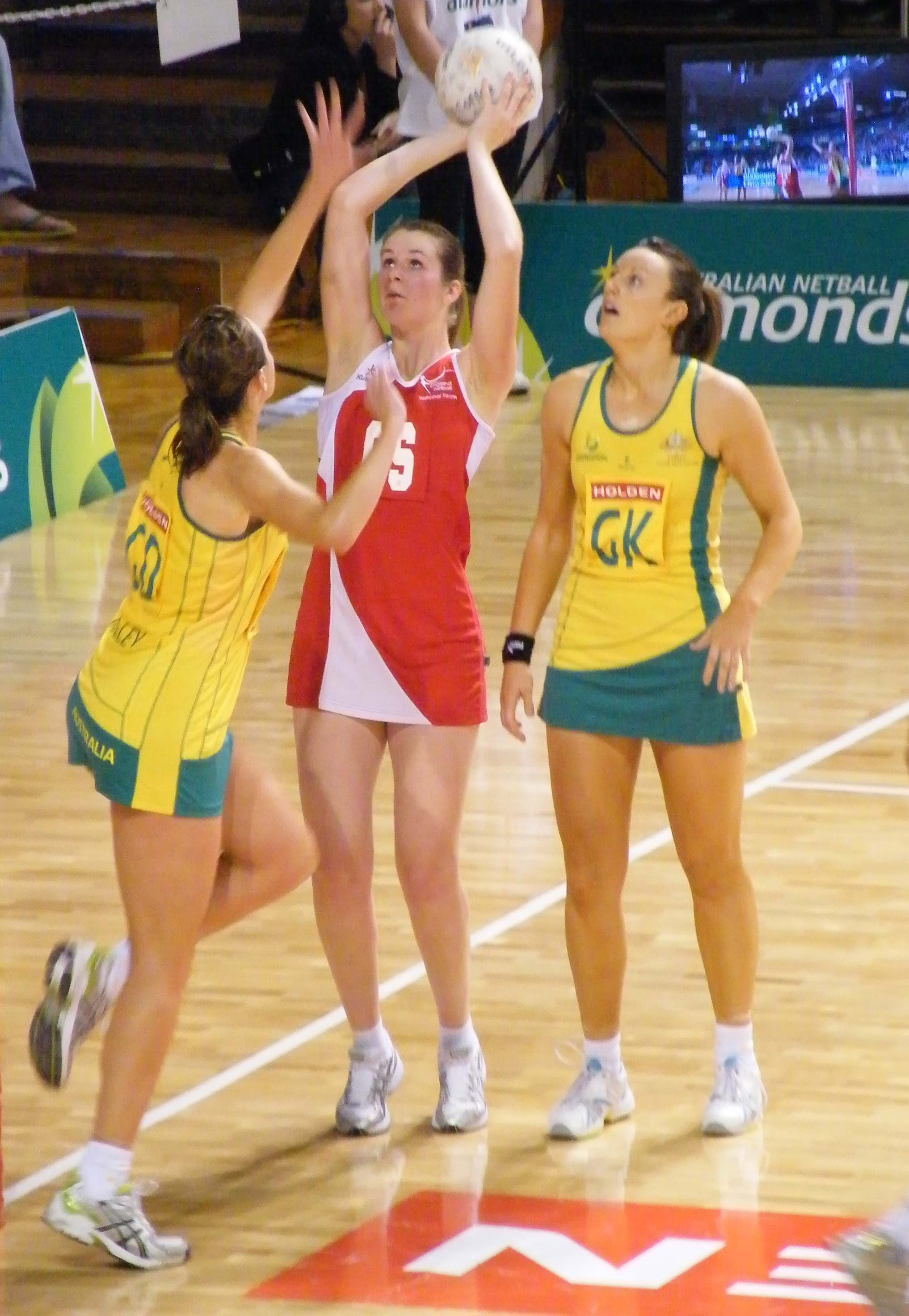

Personal information
- Full name: Louisa Watson (Née: Brownfield )
- Born: 14 April 1984 (age 42) Rochford, Essex, England
- School: The Deanes School

Netball career
- Playing position: GA/GS
Years	Club team	Apps
200x–2005	London Hurricanes	
2005–2009	Galleria Mavericks	
2009–201x	→ Hertfordshire Mavericks	
Years	National team	Caps
2006–2011	England	55
Coaching career
- Years: Team
- Bishop's Stortford College
Medal record
Representing England
World Netball Championships
Bronze medal – third place	2011 Singapore	Team
Commonwealth Games
Bronze medal – third place	2006 Melbourne	Team
Bronze medal – third place	2010 Delhi	Team
World Netball Series
Silver medal – second place	2010 Liverpool	Team
- Updated on 26 March 2020

Louisa Brownfield (born 14 April 1984), also known as Louisa Watson, is a former England netball international. She was a member of the England teams that won bronze medals at the 2006 and 2010 Commonwealth Games and at the 2011 World Netball Championships. Between 2006 and 2015, Brownfield also played for Mavericks in seven Netball Superleague grand finals, helping them win two titles in 2007–08 and 2011.

== Early life and education ==
Brownfield is originally from Thundersley, Essex. She attended The Deanes School.

== Playing career ==
=== London Hurricanes ===
During the Super Cup era, Brownfield played for London Hurricanes. Along with Abby Teare, Chioma Ezeogu and Sonia Mkoloma, she was a member of the Hurricanes team that lost to London Tornadoes in the 2003 Super Cup final.

=== Mavericks ===
Between 2006 and 2011, Brownfield played for Mavericks in six successive Netball Superleague grand finals. Brownfield was the top scorer in the grand final when Mavericks won their first Netball Superleague title in the 2007–08 after defeating Loughborough Lightning by 43–39. Other members of the team included Amanda Newton and Karen Atkinson. She was also top scorer in the 2009 and 2010 grand finals. Brownfield was captain when Mavericks' won their second Netball Superleague title in 2011 after defeating Surrey Storm by 57–46 in the grand final. Other members of the team included Karen Atkinson, Layla Guscoth and Lindsay Keable. In 2015 Brownfield played in her seventh grand final.

	Grand finals	Place	Opponent	Goals
1	2005–06	Runners up	Team Bath	13/19 (68%)
2	2006–07	Runners up	Team Bath	28/34 (82%)
3	2007–08	Winners	Loughborough Lightning	32/37 (86%) ?
4	2008–09	Runners up	Team Bath	31/34 (91%)
5	2009–10	Runners up	Team Bath	32/40 (80%)
6	2011	Winners	Surrey Storm	37/45 (82%)
7	2015	Runners up	Surrey Storm	?

=== England ===
Brownfield was a member of the England teams that won bronze medals at the 2006 and 2010 Commonwealth Games and at the 2011 World Netball Championships. She made 55 senior appearances for England.

Tournaments	Place
2006 Commonwealth Games	3rd place, bronze medalist(s)
2007 World Netball Championships	4th
2008 Taini Jamison Trophy Series	2nd
2009 Taini Jamison Trophy Series^{(Note 1)}	1st
2010 Commonwealth Games	3rd place, bronze medalist(s)
2010 World Netball Series	2nd place, silver medalist(s)
2011 World Netball Championships	3rd place, bronze medalist(s)

Notes

- ^1 Played for a World 7

== Honours ==
England

- World Netball Series
  - Runners up: 2010: 1

World 7

- Taini Jamison Trophy
  - Winners: 2009

Mavericks

- Netball Superleague
  - Winners: 2007–08, 2011: 2
  - Runners up: 2005–06, 2006–07, 2008–09, 2009–10, 2015: 5

London Hurricanes

- Super Cup
  - Runners up: 2003: 1
