= Tamsin Greenway =

England netball international and coach

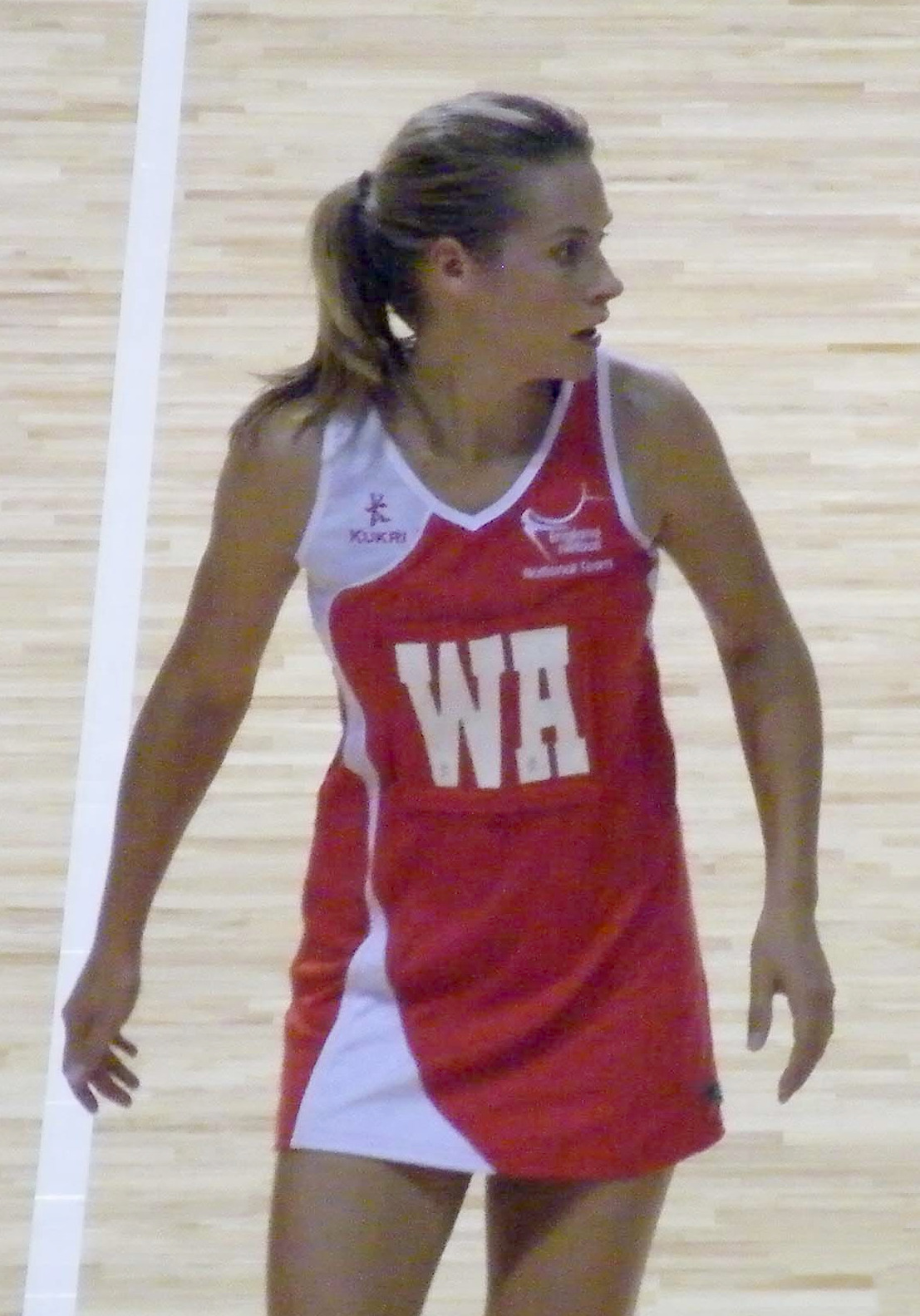
- Greenway representing England in 2008

Personal information
- Born: 6 October 1982 (age 44) Leicester, England
- Height: 1.76 m (5 ft 9 in)
- School: Bosworth Academy
- University: University of Bath

Netball career
- Playing positions: C, WA, GA
Years	Club team	Apps
2003–2009	Team Bath	
2008–2009	→ Queensland Firebirds	
2009–2015	Surrey Storm	
2016–2018	Wasps	
Years	National team	Caps
2004–2015	England	67
Coaching career
- Years: Team
- 2011–2016: Surrey Storm
- 2016–2018: Wasps
- 2020–2023: Scotland
- 2025–: London Mavericks
- 2026–: England (Ass)
Medal record
Representing England
Commonwealth Games
Bronze medal – third place	2010 Delhi	Team
Netball World Cup
Bronze medal – third place	2011 Singapore	Team
Bronze medal – third place	2015 Sydney	Team
World Netball Series
Silver medal – second place	2010 Liverpool	Team
- Updated on 17 May 2020

Tamsin Greenway (born 6 October 1982) is a former England netball international and the current Director of netball at London Mavericks and England Assistant Coach. She was a member of the England teams that won bronze medals at the 2010 Commonwealth Games and at the 2011 and 2015 Netball World Cups. Between 2006 and 2018 she played in eight Netball Superleague grand finals for three different teams – Team Bath, Surrey Storm and Wasps. During this time she won five Netball Superleague titles as a player and/or coach and a sixth as a director of netball. Greenway also works as a netball pundit for Sky Sports. Between 2020-2023, she was the head coach of the Scotland national netball team.

== Early life and education ==
Greenway is originally from Desford, Leicestershire. She was educated at the local community primary school and Bosworth Academy. In addition to netball, in her youth she played various sports including association football, tennis, table tennis, badminton and field hockey. Between 2001 and 2004 she studied Media Production at the University of Bath.

== Playing career ==
=== Team Bath ===
Between 2003 and 2009 Greenway played for Team Bath. In 2004, she was a member of the Team Bath squad that won the Super Cup. In 2005–06 she was a member of the Team Bath squad that won the inaugural Netball Superleague title. She was also a member of Team Bath squads that won further titles in 2006–07 and 2008–09. Along the way she also played in her first two Netball Superleague grand finals in 2006 and 2007. Her teammates at Team Bath included, among others, Sara Bayman, Rachel Dunn, Jess Garland, Pamela Cookey, Stacey Francis and Geva Mentor.

=== Queensland Firebirds ===
In 2008 and 2009 Greenway played for Queensland Firebirds in the ANZ Championship.

=== Surrey Storm ===
Between 2010 and 2015, Greenway played for Surrey Storm. Greenway served Surrey Storm as team captain, player/coach and director of netball. Under her leadership Surrey Storm played in five out of the six Netball Superleague grand finals between 2011 and 2016. After finishing as runners up in the first three, Surrey Storm won their first Netball Superleague title in 2015 and then retained the title in 2016. In 2015, Greenway initially announced she was retiring as a player.

=== Wasps ===
In 2016, Greenway was appointed as the first director of netball for new Netball Superleague franchise, Wasps. Greenway guided Wasps to two successive Superleague titles in 2017 and 2018. She also came out of retirement as a player and played in two further grands finals. Her Wasps teammates included Rachel Dunn, Bongiwe Msomi, Natalie Haythornthwaite, Samantha May and Jade Clarke. In July 2018, Greenway announced she was stepping down as Wasps director of netball.

	Grand finals	Team	Place	Opponent
1	2005–06	Team Bath	Winners	Galleria Mavericks
2	2006–07	Team Bath	Winners	Galleria Mavericks
3	2011	Surrey Storm	Runners up	Hertfordshire Mavericks
4	2012	Surrey Storm	Runners up	Northern Thunder
5	2014	Surrey Storm	Runners up	Manchester Thunder
6	2015	Surrey Storm	Winners	Hertfordshire Mavericks
7	2017	Wasps	Winners	Loughborough Lightning
8	2018	Wasps	Winners	Loughborough Lightning

=== England ===
Between 2004 and 2015 Greenway made 67 senior appearances for England. She made her senior debut during a series against South Africa. She previously represented England at under-19 and university levels. She subsequently represented England at the 2007 World Netball Championships. She was a member of the England teams that won bronze medals at the 2010 Commonwealth Games and at the 2011 and 2015 Netball World Cups. She was also a member of the England team that won the silver medal at the 2010 World Netball Series.

Tournaments	Place
2007 World Netball Championships	4th
2009 Taini Jamison Trophy Series^{(Note 1)}	1st
2009 World Netball Series	4th
2010 Commonwealth Games	3rd place, bronze medalist(s)
2010 World Netball Series	2nd place, silver medalist(s)
2011 World Netball Championships	3rd place, bronze medalist(s)
2011 Taini Jamison Trophy Series	2nd
2015 Netball Europe Open Championships	1st
2015 Netball World Cup	3rd place, bronze medalist(s)

Notes

- ^1 Played for a World 7

== Coaching career ==
=== Scotland ===
In February 2020, Greenway was appointed head coach of Scotland. She led the team to their highest finish at a Netball World Cup since 1994, placing 10th in 2023 and a 9th place finish at the 2022 Commonwealth Games. At the end of 2023 Greenway announced that she would be stepping down for reasons “beyond her control”.

=== England ===
Greenway has had various coaching roles within the England pathway system including the England U21 head coach for the 2017 World Championships. She was a technical coach for Roses A during the 2026 season. In October 2026 Greenway was announced as the assistant coach for England alongside head coach Anna Stembridge and assistant coach Jo Harten. She confirmed she would perform the role alongside her position at London Mavericks.

=== London Mavericks ===
Greenway joined then Saracens Mavericks as Head of Strategic Performance in 2022 which she combined with her Scotland duties.

In July 2024, Greenway was announced as the director of netball for the rebranded London Mavericks ahead of the 2025 season. Camilla Buchanan was also confirmed to remain as the head coach. Greenway took over as head coach from the 2026 season.

== Television ==
Greenway works as a netball pundit for Sky Sports. In 2011, she appeared as a Leicester City F.C. fan in the Soccerette segment of Soccer AM. She has also appeared as a guest on A Question of Sport.

== Personal life ==
Between 2012 and 2016 Greenway was in a relationship with the TV presenter Tim Lovejoy. They had a daughter together named Jamie Jeane Lovejoy (b. 2013). In November 2019, Greenway announced the birth of her second child, Casey Jaxx, with fiancé Jo Feldman.

== Honours ==
Team Bath

- Netball Superleague
  - Winners: 2005–06, 2006–07, 2008–09: 3
- Super Cup
  - Winners: 2004

Surrey Storm

- Netball Superleague
  - Winners: 2015, 2016: 2
  - Runners up: 2011, 2012, 2014: 3

Wasps Netball

- Netball Superleague
  - Winners: 2017, 2018: 2

England

- Fast5 Netball World Series
  - Runners Up: 2010

World 7

- Taini Jamison Trophy
  - Winners: 2009
