= 2010 Netball Superleague Grand Final =

UK Netball Superleague grand final

- Event: 2009–10 Netball Superleague season
| Team Bath | Hertfordshire Mavericks |
| 51 | 44 |
- Team Bath win their fourth grand final. Mavericks make their fifth successive grand final appearance.
- Date: 15 May 2010
- Venue: Trent FM Arena, Nottingham
- Player of the Match: Stacey Francis

The 2010 Netball Superleague Grand Final featured Team Bath and Hertfordshire Mavericks. Having previously played each other in the 2006, 2007 and 2008 grand finals, this was the fourth final that featured Team Bath and Mavericks. Just like the three previous encounters, it was Team Bath that emerged as winners.

Mavericks won the first quarter and remained competitive throughout the whole match. Towards the end of the second quarter, Pamela Cookey sank a shot that saw Team Bath take the lead for the first time. By half time Team Bath were leading 22–21 and at the three-quarter mark they led 36–33. However during the fourth quarter Mavericks drew level, with the scores at 37–37, before Team Bath pulled away to win by 51–44. The grand final was broadcast live on Sky Sports for the first time.

== Match summary ==
| 15 May 2010; 16.50 | Team Bath | 51–44 | Hertfordshire Mavericks | Trent FM Arena | Sky Sports |
| 15 May 2010; 16.50 | Scoring by quarter: 8–13, 22–21, 36–33, 51–44 | | | Trent FM Arena | Sky Sports |
| 15 May 2010; 16.50 | Rosie Allison 26/34 (76%); Pamela Cookey 25/35 (71%) | | Louisa Brownfield 32/40 (80%); Ella Clark 10/14 (71%); Monique Wood 2/5 (40%) | Trent FM Arena | Sky Sports |

== Teams ==
| Head Coach: Jess Garland; Assistant Coach: Anna Mayes Starting 7: GS Rosie Allison; GA Pamela Cookey (c); WA Sasha Corbin; C Joanne Binns; WD Serena Guthrie; GD Stacey Francis; GK Eboni Beckford-Chambers Bench: GS Kirsty Delves; GK/GD/GS Lindsay Keable ? Lois Rideout; GA/GW/GS Asha Tett; WA/C Amanda Trounce Squad: GK/GD Gemma Fletcher; GK/GD Alex Sinclair; WD/C Scarlett Williams | Head Coach: Maggie Jackson Starting 7: GS Louisa Brownfield (c); GA Ella Clark; WA Rose Morgan Smith; C Karen Atkinson; WD Camilla Buchanan; GD Hazel Schofield; GK Amanda Newton Bench: ? Denika Campbell-Lee ? Naomi Stenhouse; GA Monique Wood; GA Vicklyn Joseph; WD Georgia Schmidt |
