= 2015 Netball Superleague season =

Netball Superleague season

2015 Netball Superleague
- League: Netball Superleague
- Teams: 8
- TV partner: Sky Sports

2015 Netball Superleague
- Season champions: Surrey Storm
- Runners-up: Hertfordshire Mavericks
- Season MVP: Natalie Haythornthwaite (Yorkshire Jets)
- Top scorer: Lottysha Cato (Yorkshire Jets) 670/741 (90%)

Seasons
- ← 2014 2016 →

The 2015 Netball Superleague season (known for sponsorship reasons as the Zeo Netball Superleague) was the tenth season of the Netball Superleague. The league was won by Surrey Storm after defeating Hertfordshire Mavericks in the grand final. Manchester Thunder finished top of the table following the regular season but they subsequently lost to Mavericks in the semi-finals. Thunder eventually finished third overall. Yorkshire Jets were the surprise team of the season, finishing third during the regular season and fourth overall. This was the first season in Superleague history that Team Bath did not qualify for the semi-finals.

== Teams ==
| 2015 Superleague teams | Home venue/base | Country/Region |
|---|---|---|
| Celtic Dragons | Sport Wales National Centre | Wales |
| Hertfordshire Mavericks | University of Hertfordshire | East of England |
| Loughborough Lightning | Loughborough University | East Midlands |
| Manchester Thunder | Wright Robinson College | North West England |
| Team Bath | University of Bath | South West England/West of England |
| Team Northumbria | Sport Central | North East England |
| Surrey Storm | University of Surrey | Greater London/South East England |
| Yorkshire Jets | Hull / Leeds / Sheffield | Yorkshire |

== Regular season ==
This season saw extra time introduced for drawn matches. If the scores were even after sixty minutes of play, matches were to continue into extra-time, consisting of two seven minute halves. If the sides are still tied following extra-time, the game will continue until a team has moved ahead of the other, by two clear goals.

=== Results ===
Round 1

| 26 January 2015; 19:45 | Report | Manchester Thunder | 55–52 | Surrey Storm | Manchester Thunderdome |
| 26 January 2015; 19:45 | Report | Helen Housby 34/37 (92%); Kathryn Turner 21/25 (84%) | | Rachel Dunn 30/32 (94%); Pamela Cookey 22/25 (88%) | Manchester Thunderdome |

| 30 January 2015; 20:00 | Yorkshire Jets | 70–44 | Loughborough Lightning | English Institute of Sport, Sheffield |

| 31 January 2015; 18:30 | Report | Team Northumbria | 33–49 | Team Bath | Sport Central |

| 31 January 2015; 19:00 | Celtic Dragons | 39–54 | Hertfordshire Mavericks | Cardiff City House of Sport |

Round 2

| 2 February 2015; 19:45 | Celtic Dragons | 34–48 | Team Northumbria | Sport Wales National Centre |

| 7 February 2015; 16:00 | Hertfordshire Mavericks | 48–40 | Loughborough Lightning | Hertfordshire Sports Village |

| 7 February 2015; 17:00 | Report | Manchester Thunder | 51–32 | Team Bath | Manchester Thunderdome |

| 7 February 2015; 19:00 | Report | Surrey Storm | 74–51 | Yorkshire Jets | Surrey Sports Park |
| 7 February 2015; 19:00 | Report | Rachel Dunn 58/67 (87%); Pamela Cookey 16/20 (80%) | | Lottysha Cato 48/51 (94%); Natalie Haythornthwaite 3/3 (100%) | Surrey Sports Park |

Round 3

| 9 February 2015; 19:45 | Report | Manchester Thunder | 49–42 | Hertfordshire Mavericks | Manchester Thunderdome |

| 9 February 2015; 19:30 | Loughborough Lightning | 58–44 | Celtic Dragons | Loughborough University |
| 9 February 2015; 19:30 | Peace Proscovia 43/47 (91%); Maryka Holtzhausen 13/16 (81%); Vanessa Walker 2/2 (100%) | | | Loughborough University |

| 9 February 2015; 19:45 | Report | Team Bath | 42–56 | Surrey Storm | University of Bath | Sky Sports |
| 9 February 2015; 19:45 | Report | Rosie Allison 36/41 (88%); Asha Francis 3/6 (50%); Rachel Shaw 3/5 (60%) | | Rachel Dunn 38/43 (88%); Pamela Cookey 18/19 (95%) | University of Bath | Sky Sports |

| 9 February 2015; 19:30 | Team Northumbria | 45–59 | Yorkshire Jets | Sport Central |

Round 4

| 13 February 2015; 19:45 | Report | Team Bath | 34–51 | Hertfordshire Mavericks | University of Bath |
| 13 February 2015; 19:45 | Report | Rosie Allison 19/25 (76%); Asha Francis 8/10 (80%); Rachel Shaw 7/12 (58%) | | Sasha Corbin 27/30 (90%); Louisa Watson 24/27 (89%) | University of Bath |

| 13 February 2015; 20:00 | Report | Yorkshire Jets | 51–54 | Manchester Thunder | Leeds Beckett University |
| 13 February 2015; 20:00 | Report | ? | | Helen Housby 32/32 (100%); Eleanor Cardwell 10/13 (77%); Krista Enziano 8/10 (80%); Kathryn Turner 4/7 (57%) | Leeds Beckett University |

| 14 February 2015; 19:00 | Report | Surrey Storm | 66–49 | Celtic Dragons | Surrey Sports Park |
| 14 February 2015; 19:00 | Report | Rachel Dunn 41/46 (89%); Pamela Cookey 16/18 (89%); Kat Hayes 9/13 (69%) | | Chelsea Lewis 35/45 (78%); Cara Lea Moseley 8/11 (73%); Emma Thomas 6/7 (86%) | Surrey Sports Park |

| 16 February 2015; 19:45 | Team Northumbria | 48–57 | Loughborough Lightning | Sport Central |

Round 5

| 20 February 2015; 19:45 | Report | Team Bath | 51–54 | Yorkshire Jets | University of Bath |

| 21 February 2015; 16:00 | Hertfordshire Mavericks | 61–35 | Team Northumbria | Hertfordshire Sports Village |
| 21 February 2015; 16:00 | Louisa Watson 30/33 (91%) | | | Hertfordshire Sports Village |

| 21 February 2015; 18:00 | Report | Loughborough Lightning | 48–68 | Surrey Storm | Loughborough University |

| 23 February 2015; 19:45 | Report | Manchester Thunder | 81–36 | Celtic Dragons | Manchester Thunderdome |

Round 6

| 28 February 2015; 14:00 | Report | Celtic Dragons | 36–42 | Team Bath | Deeside Leisure Centre |

| 28 February 2015; 17:00 | Report | Manchester Thunder | 68–52 | Loughborough Lightning | Manchester Thunderdome |

| 28 February 2015; 20:00 | Report | Surrey Storm | 69–35 | Team Northumbria | Surrey Sports Park |
| 28 February 2015; 20:00 | Report | Rachel Dunn 43/53 (81%); Pamela Cookey 20/22 (91%); Katie Harris 6/6 (100%) | | Jatjinda Kambatuku 16/22 (73%); Caroline O'Hanlon 8/14 (57%); Ellie Smith 7/9 (78%); Kayley Moss 5/6 (83%) | Surrey Sports Park |

| 2 March 2015; 19:45 | Yorkshire Jets | 56–42 | Hertfordshire Mavericks | University of Huddersfield |

Round 7

| 6 March 2015; 19:30 | Report | Team Northumbria | 31–64 | Manchester Thunder | Sport Central |

| 6 March 2015; 19:45 | Report | Team Bath | 45–43 | Loughborough Lightning | University of Bath |
| 6 March 2015; 19:45 | Report | Rosie Allison 32/35 (91%); Asha Francis 13/17 (76%) | | Peace Proscovia 36/38 (95%); Vanessa Walker 5/5 (100%); Maryka Holtzhausen 2/3 (67%) | University of Bath |

| 7 March 2015; 18:00 | Report | Surrey Storm | 55–42 | Hertfordshire Mavericks | Copper Box Arena; Attendance: 6,033 |
| 7 March 2015; 18:00 | Report | Rachel Dunn 36/38 (95%); Pamela Cookey 19/22 (86%) | | Louisa Watson 22/24 (92%); Kadeen Corbin 15/18 (83%); Sophie Hankin 4/7 (57%); Sarah East 1/2 (50%) | Copper Box Arena; Attendance: 6,033 |

| 7 March 2015; 16:00 | Celtic Dragons | 48–60 | Yorkshire Jets | Sport Wales National Centre |

Round 8

| 9 March 2015; 19:30 | Loughborough Lightning | 56–65 | Yorkshire Jets | Loughborough University |

| 13 March 2015; 19:45 | Report | Team Bath | 63–24 | Team Northumbria | University of Bath |

| 14 March 2015; 16:00 | Hertfordshire Mavericks | 67–30 | Celtic Dragons | Hertfordshire Sports Village |

| 14 March 2015; 19:00 | Report | Surrey Storm | 47–58 | Manchester Thunder | Surrey Sports Park |
| 14 March 2015; 19:00 | Report | Rachel Dunn 29/37 (78%); Pamela Cookey 18/21 (86%) | | Helen Housby 39/40 (98%); Kathryn Turner 19/20 (95%) | Surrey Sports Park |

Round 9

| 16 March 2015; 20:00 | Report | Hertfordshire Mavericks | 43–56 | Manchester Thunder | Jean Brown Indoor Arena (Redbridge) |

| 16 March 2015; 19:45 | Celtic Dragons | 53–52 | Loughborough Lightning | Sport Wales National Centre |

| 16 March 2015; 20:00 | Yorkshire Jets | 58–49 | Team Northumbria | Hull Arena |

| 17 March 2015; 20:00 | Report | Surrey Storm | 61–39 | Team Bath | Surrey Sports Park |
| 17 March 2015; 20:00 | Report | Rachel Dunn 41/50 (82%); Pamela Cookey 20/22 (91%) | | Rosie Allison 21/23 (91%); Asha Francis 9/14 (64%); Shaunagh Craig 7/9 (78%); Rachel Shaw 2/2 (100%) | Surrey Sports Park |

Round 10

| 20 March 2015; 20:00 | Report | Yorkshire Jets | 56–69 | Surrey Storm | Leeds Beckett University |

| 21 March 2015; 18:00 | Loughborough Lightning | 45–58 | Hertfordshire Mavericks | Loughborough University |

| 21 March 2015; 18:30 | Team Northumbria | 48–55 | Celtic Dragons | Sport Central |

| 23 March 2015; 19:45 | Report | Team Bath | 37–40 | Manchester Thunder | University of Bath |

Round 11

| 27 March 2015; 19:30 | Loughborough Lightning | 57–36 | Team Northumbria | Loughborough University |

| 28 March 2015; 17:00 | Report | Manchester Thunder | 57–56 | Yorkshire Jets | Manchester Thunderdome |

| 28 March 2015; 16:00 | Report | Celtic Dragons | 30–73 | Surrey Storm | Sport Wales National Centre |

| 30 March 2015; 19:45 | Report | Hertfordshire Mavericks | 42–33 | Team Bath | Hertfordshire Sports Village |

Round 12

| 2 April 2015; 18:00 | Team Northumbria | 40–58 | Hertfordshire Mavericks | Sport Central |

| 2 April 2015; 20:00 | Report | Yorkshire Jets | 55–44 | Team Bath | Leeds Beckett University |

| 4 April 2015; 19:00 | Report | Surrey Storm | 74–45 | Loughborough Lightning | Surrey Sports Park |
| 4 April 2015; 19:00 | Report | Rachel Dunn 46/56 (82%); Pamela Cookey 23/26 (88%); Katie Harris 5/6 (83%) | | Peace Proscovia 40/43 (93%); Flo Edwards 2/2 (100%); Vanessa Walker 2/2 (100%); Maryka Holtzhausen 1/1 (100%) | Surrey Sports Park |

| 4 April 2015; 14:00 | Report | Celtic Dragons | 29–57 | Manchester Thunder | Sport Wales National Centre |

Round 13

| 6 April 2015; 14:00 | Report | Hertfordshire Mavericks | 41–59 | Surrey Storm | Hertfordshire Sports Village |
| 6 April 2015; 14:00 | Report | Sarah East 25/30 (83%); Sophie Hankin 8/10 (80%); Louisa Watson 8/10 (80%) | | Rachel Dunn 30/43 (70%); Pamela Cookey 29/33 (88%) | Hertfordshire Sports Village |

| 6 April 2015; 19:45 | Yorkshire Jets | 75–47 | Celtic Dragons | Hull Arena |

| 6 April 2015; 17:00 | Report | Manchester Thunder | 77–34 | Team Northumbria | Manchester Thunderdome |
| 6 April 2015; 17:00 | Report | ? | | Jatjinda Kambatuku 16/17 (94%) | Manchester Thunderdome |

| 6 April 2015; 19:30 | Report | Loughborough Lightning | 51–45 | Team Bath | Loughborough University |

Round 14

| 11 April 2015; 18:00 | Report | Loughborough Lightning | 40–51 | Manchester Thunder | Loughborough University |
| 11 April 2015; 18:00 | Report | Peace Proscovia 24/27 (89%); Maryka Holtzhausen 6/10 (60%); Vanessa Walker 2/3 (67%) | | Helen Housby 24/27 (89%); Krista Enziano 16/21 (76%); Kathryn Turner 8/11 (73%); Eleanor Cardwell 3/8 (38%) | Loughborough University |

| 11 April 2015; 16:00 | Hertfordshire Mavericks | 50–54 | Yorkshire Jets | Jean Brown Indoor Arena (Redbridge) |

| 13 April 2015; 19:30 | Report | Team Northumbria | 20–86 | Surrey Storm | Sport Central |
| 13 April 2015; 19:30 | Report | Jatjinda Kambatuku 4/7 (57%); Ellie Smith 1/1 (100%); Lisa Bowman 15/17 (88%) | | Rachel Dunn 34/45 (76%); Pamela Cookey 30/33 (91%); Kat Hayes 11/13 (85%); Katie Harris 11/12 (92%) | Sport Central |

| 13 April 2015; 19:45 | Team Bath | 50–34 | Celtic Dragons | University of Bath |
| 13 April 2015; 19:45 | Shaunagh Craig 21/32 (66%); Asha Francis 15/22 (68%); Rosie Allison 14/16 (88%) | | Chelsea Lewis 27/38 (71%); Emma Thomas 7/10 (70%) | University of Bath |

=== Final table ===
Manchester Thunder finished top of the table following the regular season. Surrey Storm finished second. Yorkshire Jets finished third after winning ten games, six points ahead of fourth placed Hertfordshire Mavericks. This was the first season in Superleague history that Team Bath did not qualify for the semi-finals.

2015 Netball Superleague
| Pos | Team | Pld | W | D | L | GF | GA | GD | Pts | Qualification |
|---|---|---|---|---|---|---|---|---|---|---|
| 1 | Manchester Thunder (Q) | 14 | 14 | 0 | 0 | 859 | 630 | +229 | 42 | Qualified for the play-offs |
| 2 | Surrey Storm (Q) | 14 | 12 | 0 | 2 | 985 | 671 | +314 | 36 | Qualified for the play-offs |
| 3 | Yorkshire Jets (Q) | 14 | 10 | 0 | 4 | 880 | 806 | +74 | 30 | Qualified for the play-offs |
| 4 | Hertfordshire Mavericks (Q) | 14 | 8 | 0 | 6 | 747 | 666 | +81 | 24 | Qualified for the play-offs |
| 5 | Team Bath | 14 | 5 | 0 | 9 | 606 | 631 | −25 | 15 | |
| 6 | Loughborough Lightning | 14 | 4 | 0 | 10 | 688 | 747 | −59 | 12 | |
| 7 | Celtic Dragons | 14 | 2 | 0 | 12 | 564 | 821 | −257 | 6 | |
| 8 | Team Northumbria | 14 | 1 | 0 | 13 | 526 | 847 | −321 | 3 | |

(Q) Qualified for the phase indicated

== Play-offs ==
=== Semi-finals ===
| 18 April 2015; 16:10 | Surrey Storm | 76–60 | Yorkshire Jets | Surrey Sports Park |
| 18 April 2015; 16:10 | Rachel Dunn 43/49 (88%); Pamela Cookey 33/38 (87%) | | Lottysha Cato 55/58 (95%); Natalie Haythornthwaite 4/5 (80%); Nikki Smith 1/1 (100%) | Surrey Sports Park |

| 18 April 2015; 18:10 | Manchester Thunder | 41–48 | Hertfordshire Mavericks | Manchester Arena; Attendance: 4,000 |

=== 3rd/4th place play off ===
| 25 April 2015; 16:00 | Manchester Thunder | 55–49 | Yorkshire Jets | Copper Box Arena |

== Grand Final ==
| 25 April 2015; 18:10 | Surrey Storm | 56–39 | Hertfordshire Mavericks | Copper Box Arena; Attendance: 6,000; Umpires: Gary Burgess; Jackie Mizon | Sky Sports |
| 25 April 2015; 18:10 | Scoring by quarter: 13–10, 26–20, 38–30, 56–39 | | | Copper Box Arena; Attendance: 6,000; Umpires: Gary Burgess; Jackie Mizon | Sky Sports |
| 25 April 2015; 18:10 | Pamela Cookey; Rachel Dunn | | Louisa Watson; Kadeen Corbin | Copper Box Arena; Attendance: 6,000; Umpires: Gary Burgess; Jackie Mizon | Sky Sports |

== Top scorers ==
| Player | Team | Attempts | Goals | % |
|---|---|---|---|---|
| (Grenada) Lottysha Cato | Yorkshire Jets | 741 | 670 | 90% |
| (England) Rachel Dunn | Surrey Storm | 646 | 552 | 85% |
| (Uganda) Peace Proscovia | Loughborough Lightning | 599 | 548 | 91% |
| (Wales) Chelsea Lewis | Celtic Dragons | 534 | 420 | 79% |
| (England) Helen Housby | Manchester Thunder | 418 | 380 | 91% |
| (England) Rosie Allison | Team Bath | 363 | 300 | 83% |
| (England) Pamela Cookey | Surrey Storm | 338 | 304 | 90% |
| (Northern Ireland) Lisa Bowman | Team Northumbria | 382 | 282 | 74% |
| (England) Louisa Watson | Hertfordshire Mavericks | 323 | 276 | 85% |
| (Australia) Sarah East | Hertfordshire Mavericks | 217 | 186 | 86% |

== See also ==
- 2015 Surrey Storm season
