= 2013 Fast5 Netball World Series =

International Fast5 tournament hosted by New Zealand

Tournament details
- Host country: New Zealand
- City: Auckland
- Venue: Vector Arena
- Dates: 8–10 November 2013
- Teams: 6
- TV partner: Sky Sport (New Zealand)

Final positions
- Champions: New Zealand (4th title)
- Runners-up: Australia
- Third place: Jamaica

Tournament statistics
- Matches played: 20

The 2013 Fast5 Netball World Series was the 5th Fast5 Netball World Series. New Zealand hosted Australia, England, Jamaica, Malawi and South Africa in a series, played in November 2013, at Auckland's Vector Arena. With a team coached by Janine Southby and captained by Casey Kopua, New Zealand won the series for the fourth time after defeating Australia 56–27 in the final. Sky Sport (New Zealand) was the main broadcaster. The broadcast was hosted by Melodie Robinson, with a commentary panel that included Temepara Bailey and Geva Mentor.

== Squads ==
Participating teams and rosters
Australia	England	Jamaica	Malawi	New Zealand	South Africa
Ashleigh Brazill; Courtney Bruce; Tegan Caldwell; Carla Dziwoki (cc); Paige Hadley; Demelza McLoud; Susan Pratley (cc); Gabi Simpson; Gretel Tippett; Joanna Weston	Rosalie Allison; Kadeen Corbin; Rachel Dunn; Stacey Francis; Jodie Gibson; Layla Guscoth; Serena Guthrie; Lindsay Keable; Laura Malcolm; Mia Ritchie	Romelda Aiken (cc); Shanice Beckford; Jhaniele Fowler; Thristina Hardwood; Malysha Kelly (cc); Shamera Sterling; Paula Thompson; Vanessa Walker; Khadijah Williams; Vangalee Williams	Melenia Gideon; Joanna Kachilika; Tina Kamzati; Bridget Kumwenda; Mwai Kumwenda; Takwonda Lwazi; Jessie Mazengera; Caroline Mtukule (c); Joyce Mvula; Towera Vinkhumbo	Katarina Cooper; Katrina Grant; Shannon Francois; Casey Kopua (c); Laura Langman; Cathrine Latu; Te Huinga Reo Selby-Rickit; Courtney Tairi; Anna Thompson; Maria Tutaia	Chrisna Bootha; Nadet Budnik; Zukelwa Cwaba; Nontle Gwavu; Maryke Holtzhausen (c); Tsakane Mbewe; Simnikiwe Mdaka; Karla Mostert; Bongiwe Msomi; Adele Niemand
Coach: Jane Searle	Coach: Anna Mayes	Coach: Oberon Pitterson	Coach: Griffin Saenda	Coach: Janine Southby	Coach: Lana Krige
Assistant coach: Jane Woodlands-Thompson	Assistant coaches: Colette Thomson	Assistant coach: Minneth Reynolds	Assistant coach: Mary Waya	Assistant coach: Julie Seymour	Assistant coach: Claudine Claassen

== Match officials ==
Umpires

Umpire	Association
Ian Fuller	England
Dalton Hinds	Jamaica
Fay Meiklejohn	New Zealand
Yvonne Morgan	New Zealand
Terrence Peart	Jamaica
Janice Treasure	England
Marielouw van der Merwe	South Africa

== Round robin stage ==
=== Day 1 ===
8 November 2013	Jamaica	35–28	South Africa
16:45 (NZDT)

8 November 2013	Australia	40–19	England
17:30 NZDT

8 November 2013	New Zealand	43–22	Jamaica
18:15 NZDT

8 November 2013	Australia	42–37	Malawi
19:15 NZDT

8 November 2013	England	36–29	South Africa
20:00 NZDT

8 November 2013	Jamaica	37–35	Malawi
20:45 NZDT

8 November 2014	New Zealand	39–26	Australia
21:30 NZDT

=== Day 2 ===
9 November 2013	Jamaica	36–30	England
16:15 NZDT

9 November 2013	New Zealand	48–18	Malawi
17:00 NZDT

9 November 2013	South Africa	40–39	Australia
17:45 NZDT

9 November 2013	Malawi	35–32	England
18:30 NZDT

9 November 2013	New Zealand	58–31	South Africa
19:15 NZDT

9 November 2013	Australia	41–41	Jamaica
20:00 NZDT

9 November 2013	South Africa	41–35	Malawi
20:00 NZDT

9 November 2013	New Zealand	31–27	England
21:30 NZDT

=== Ladder ===
Pos	Team	P	W	L	D	GF	GA	GD	Pts
1	New Zealand	5	5	0	0	219	124	+95	10
2	Jamaica	5	3	1	1	171	177	-6	7
3	Australia	5	2	2	1	188	176	+12	5
4	South Africa	5	2	3	0	169	203	-34	4
5	Malawi	5	1	4	0	160	200	-40	2
6	England	5	1	4	0	144	171	-27	2

Qualified for Semi-final 1
Qualified for Semi-final 2
Qualified for 5th/6th place match

== Playoffs ==
=== Semi-final 1 ===
10 November 2013	New Zealand	27–14	South Africa
15:15 NZDT

=== Semi-final 2 ===
10 November 2013	Australia	27–25	Jamaica
16:00 NZDT

=== 5th v 6th Playoff ===
10 November 2013	Malawi	34–32	England
16:45 NZDT

=== 3rd v 4th Playoff ===
10 November 2013	Jamaica	44–17	South Africa
18:45 (NZDT)

=== Final ===
10 November 2013	New Zealand	56–27	Australia
19:35 NZDT

== Award winners ==
Award	Winner	Team
Player of the Tournament	Thristina Harwood	Jamaica

== Final Placings ==
Rank	Team
1st place, gold medalist(s)	New Zealand
2nd place, silver medalist(s)	Australia
3rd place, bronze medalist(s)	Jamaica
4	South Africa
5	Malawi
6	England
