= Lindsay Keable =

English netball player (born 1988)

Personal information
- Born: 11 June 1988 (age 38)
- Occupations: Teacher & Netball Coach
- Height: 1.92 m (6 ft 4 in)
- School: Moulsham High School
- University: University of Gloucestershire

Netball career
- Playing positions: GK, GD
Years	Club team	Apps
200x-2009	Celtic Dragons	
2009-2010	Team Bath	
2010–2019	Hertfordshire Mavericks	
2020-2023	London Pulse	
Years	National team	Caps
2010-2018	England	11
Coaching career
- Years: Team
- 2025-present: London Pulse NXT Gen (Ass)
Medal record
Representing England
Fast5 World Series
Silver medal – second place	2010 Liverpool	Fastnet
Silver medal – second place	2012 Auckland	Fast5
- Updated on May 2025

Lindsay Keable (born 11 June 1988) is a retired English netball player who played for England and in the Netball Super League most notably for Hertfordshire Mavericks and London Pulse. She is the current Assistant Coach of London Pulse's NXT Gen team.

== Early life and education ==
Keable attended Moulsham High School, in Chelmsford, Essex. She completed her PGCE in Religious Studies at the University of Gloucestershire.

== Club career ==
=== Celtic Dragons ===
Keable started her Netball Super League career with Welsh side Celtic Dragons.

=== Team Bath ===
Keable moved to Team Bath ahead of the 2009-10 season where she played alongside Eboni Usoro-Brown, Serena Guthrie and Pamela Cookey. She won her first Netball Super League title, defeating Hertfordshire Mavericks 51–44 in the grand final.

=== Hertfordshire Mavericks ===
Keable joined Hertfordshire Mavericks ahead of the 2011 season. She would win her second consecutive Netball Super League title with Mavericks after defeating Surrey Storm 57–46 in the Grand Final. They reached a second grand final in 2015 this time losing to Surrey Storm.

Keable was named the vice captain of Mavericks for the 2019 Netball Super League season along with the captain Sasha Corbin.

=== London Pulse ===
Keable joined London Pulse in 2020 and was named co-captain. In the 2023 season London Pulse reached the Grand Final, their highest finish in the league, however they lost 48-57 to Loughborough Lightning.

She announced her retirement from netball in 2023 with 250 Super League appearances, however she would remain at London Pulse in a part-time coaching capacity in the Academy.

== International career ==
Keable was named in the squad for the 2010 World Netball Series where England won the silver medal. She won a second silver medal at the 2012 Fast5 Netball World Series. The next year Keable attended 2013 Fast5 Netball World Series where England placed sixth.

== Coaching ==
Keable was named as the assistant coach of London Pulse's NXT Gen team ahead of the 2025 season.

== Personal life ==
Keable is a Philosophy & Ethics teacher, Head of Netball and House Mistress at Felsted School.

== Honours ==
=== England ===
- Fast5 Netball World Series: Silver: 2010, 2012

=== Team Bath ===
- Netball Super League: 2010

=== Hertfordshire Mavericks ===
- Netball Super League: 2011
