= 2007 Netball Superleague Grand Final =

Netball Superleague grand final

- Event: 2006–07 Netball Superleague season
| Team Bath | Galleria Mavericks |
| 53 | 45 |
- Team Bath and Galleria Mavericks meet in the Netball Superleague grand final for a second time. Team Bath win their second title.
- Date: 9 June 2007
- Venue: Guildford Spectrum, Guildford
- Player of the Match: Geva Mentor

The 2007 Netball Superleague Grand Final featured Team Bath and Galleria Mavericks. Team Bath would eventually retain the title but in the grand final it was Mavericks who started the stronger and were leading 10–12 after the first quarter and 21–22 at half time. Both Rachel Dunn and Pamela Cookey initially underperformed for Team Bath. However in the third quarter, Cookey scored 7/8 while Player of the Match, Geva Mentor, made a number of key turnovers to deny Mavericks shooting opportunities. Their combined efforts saw Team Bath take the lead for the first time. However a return of 9/9 from Mavericks' Louisa Brownfield saw Team Bath lead by just 36–35 after three quarters. With just four minutes remaining the score was still 45–45. However after an injury time out, Team Bath returned the stronger with both Dunn and Cookey converting the goals that eventually saw them finish as winners by 53–45.

== Match summary ==
| 9 June 2007 | Team Bath | 53–45 | Galleria Mavericks | Guildford Spectrum; Umpires: Bill Alexander; Judith Groves | Sky Sports |
| 9 June 2007 | Scoring by quarter: 10–12, 21–22, 36–35, 53–45 | | | Guildford Spectrum; Umpires: Bill Alexander; Judith Groves | Sky Sports |
| 9 June 2007 | Pamela Cookey 22/26 (85%); Rachel Dunn 31/41 (76%) | | Louisa Brownfield 28/34 (82%); Joanne Harten 15/19 (79%) | Guildford Spectrum; Umpires: Bill Alexander; Judith Groves | Sky Sports |

== Teams ==
| Head Coach: Jan Crabtree Starting 7: GS Rachel Dunn; GA Pamela Cookey; WA Tamsin Greenway; C Sara Bayman; WD Natalie Seaton; GD Ursula Bowers (c); GK Geva Mentor Substitutes: C Joanna Binns for Bayman (Q3) Squad: GS/GD/GK Eboni Beckford-Chambers; C/WA Sasha Corbin; GD/GK Gemma Fletcher; GD/GK/WD Stacey Francis; C/WA Serena Guthrie; GD/GK Samantha Perry; GA/GS Monique Wood | Head Coach: Maggie Jackson; Assistant Coaches: Fiona Murtagh and Sam Bird Starting 7: GS Joanne Harten; GA Louisa Brownfield; WA Karen Atkinson; C Deb Jones; WD Naomi Siddall; GD Amanda Newton; GK Janet Coulburne Substitutes: Changes: |
