= 2006 Netball Superleague Grand Final =

Netball Superleague grand final

- Event: 2005–06 Netball Superleague season
Team Bath	Galleria Mavericks
43	35
- The inaugural Netball Superleague grand final. Team Bath win their first title. Mavericks make the first of six successive grand final appearances.
- Date: 10 June 2006
- Venue: Guildford Spectrum, Guildford

The 2006 Netball Superleague Grand Final featured Team Bath and Galleria Mavericks. Team Bath won the inaugural Netball Superleague title with a 43–35 win over Mavericks. Joanne Binns was prominent in both attack and defence as Team Bath fought back after going behind by three goals early on. The introduction Lynsey Armitage saw Mavericks launch a fightback but it was not enough. Rachel Dunn was top scorer for Team Bath with 29 goals.

== Match summary ==
10 June 2006	Team Bath	43–35	Galleria Mavericks	Guildford Spectrum; Umpires: Bill Alexander and Margaret Deighan
10 June 2006	Scoring by quarter: 10–8, 22–15, 32–22, 43–35			Guildford Spectrum; Umpires: Bill Alexander and Margaret Deighan
10 June 2006	Rachel Dunn 29/34 (85%); Pamela Cookey 14/28 (50%)		Lynsey Armitage 15/18 (83%); Louisa Brownfield 13/19 (68%); Ann Marie Muller 4/8 (50%); Heather Clarke 3/6 (50%)	Guildford Spectrum; Umpires: Bill Alexander and Margaret Deighan

== Teams ==
Head Coach: Jan Crabtree Starting 7: GS Rachel Dunn; GA Pamela Cookey; WA Tamsin Greenway; C Joanna Binns; WD Claire Elsley; GD Ursula Bowers (c); GK Geva Mentor Substitutes: C Sonya Crowe Squad: GD/GK Gemma Fletcher; GD/GK Stacey Francis; WA/GA Jess Garland; C/WD/WA Adele Modeste; WD/GD/GK Bianca Modeste; GA/GS Chrissy Munro; GA/GS Asha Tett	Head Coach: Starting 7: GS Louisa Brownfield; GA Ann Marie Muller; WA Sasha Corbin; C Debbie Jones; WD Naomi Stenhouse; GD Amanda Newton; GK Janet Coulburne Substitutes: GS Lynsey Armitage; GA Heather Clarke for Brownfield; WD Natalie Seaton for Stenhouse
