= 2006–07 Netball Superleague season =

Netball Superleague season

- League: Netball Superleague
- Number of teams: 8
- TV partner(s): Sky Sports
- Champions: Team Bath
- Runners-up: Galleria Mavericks

Seasons
- ← 2005–06 2007–08 →

The 2006–07 Netball Superleague season saw Team Bath finish as champions for the second time. Team Bath retained the title without losing a single match all season. For a second successive season they defeated Galleria Mavericks in the grand final. This was also the first season that Sky Sports began to broadcast matches.

== Overview ==
In November 2006 it was announced that Sky Sports would begin to broadcast Superleague matches. Team Bath retained the title without losing a single match all season.

== Teams ==
2006–07 Superleague teams	Home venue/base	Country/Region
Brunel Hurricanes	Brunel University London	Greater London/South East England
Celtic Dragons	Welsh Institute of Sport	Wales
Galleria Mavericks	University of Hertfordshire	East of England
Leeds Met Carnegie	Leeds Metropolitan University	Yorkshire
Loughborough Lightning	Loughborough University	East Midlands
Northern Thunder	Bury, Greater Manchester	North West England
Team Bath	University of Bath	South West England/West of England
Team Northumbria	Gateshead Leisure Centre	North East England

== Regular season ==
=== Final table ===
2006–07 Netball Superleague
Pos	Team	Pld	W	D	L	GF	GA	PP	Pts
1	Team Bath	14	14	0	0	920	436	211.0	28
2	Galleria Mavericks	14	10	0	4	658	466	141.2	20
3	Brunel Hurricanes	14	10	0	4	556	479	116.1	20
4	Loughborough Lightning	14	9	1	4	687	531	129.4	19
5	Team Northumbria	14	6	1	7	547	635	86.1	13
6	Northern Thunder	14	4	0	10	510	656	77.7	8
7	Celtic Dragons	14	2	0	12	435	698	62.3	4
8	Leeds Met Carnegie	14	0	0	14	376	788	47.7	0

== Grand Final ==
9 June 2007	Team Bath	53–45	Galleria Mavericks	Guildford Spectrum; Umpires: Bill Alexander; Judith Groves	Sky Sports
9 June 2007	Scoring by quarter: 10–12, 21–22, 36–35, 53–45			Guildford Spectrum; Umpires: Bill Alexander; Judith Groves	Sky Sports
9 June 2007	Pamela Cookey 22/26 (85%); Rachel Dunn 31/41 (76%)		Louisa Brownfield 28/34 (82%); Joanne Harten 15/19 (79%)	Guildford Spectrum; Umpires: Bill Alexander; Judith Groves	Sky Sports
