= 2015 Netball Superleague Grand Final =

Netball Superleague grand final

- Event: 2015 Netball Superleague season
Surrey Storm	Hertfordshire Mavericks
.	.
56	39
- Surrey Storm's second consecutive grand final. Storm win first Superleague title.
- Date: 25 April 2015
- Venue: Copper Box Arena, London
- Player of the Match: Pamela Cookey
- Attendance: 6,000

The 2015 Netball Superleague Grand Final featured Surrey Storm and Hertfordshire Mavericks. Having previously played each other in 2011 this was the second grand final featuring both teams. Mavericks won the 2011 encounter. This was also Surrey Storm's fourth grand final appearance in five years. Storm beat Hertfordshire Mavericks 56–39 to win their first Superleague title. Storm led from the first quarter and, with a dominant display in attack from Player of the Match, Pamela Cookey, they eventually pulled seventeen points clear of the Mavericks.

== Match summary ==
25 April 2015; 18:10	Surrey Storm	56–39	Hertfordshire Mavericks	Copper Box Arena; Attendance: 6,000; Umpires: Gary Burgess; Jackie Mizon	Sky Sports
25 April 2015; 18:10	Scoring by quarter: 13–10, 26–20, 38–30, 56–39			Copper Box Arena; Attendance: 6,000; Umpires: Gary Burgess; Jackie Mizon	Sky Sports
25 April 2015; 18:10	Pamela Cookey; Rachel Dunn		Louisa Watson; Kadeen Corbin	Copper Box Arena; Attendance: 6,000; Umpires: Gary Burgess; Jackie Mizon	Sky Sports

Head Coach: Tamsin Greenway Starting 7: GS Rachel Dunn; GA Pamela Cookey; WA Tamsin Greenway; C Bongiwe Msomi; WD Kathryn Ainsworth; GD Katy Holland; GK Hannah Reid (c) Substitutes: Amy Flanagan for Ainsworth (Q4) Changes:	Head Coach: Sam Bird Starting 7: GS Kadeen Corbin; GA Louisa Watson; WA Sasha Corbin; C Camilla Buchanan; WD Samantha May; GD Layla Guscoth; GK Naida Hutchinson Substitutes: Lindsay Keable for Hutchinson Changes:
