= 2011 Netball Superleague Grand Final =

Netball Superleague grand final

- Event: 2011 Netball Superleague season
Hertfordshire Mavericks	Surrey Storm
	.
57	46
- Mavericks win their second title. Surrey Storm make their grand final debut.
- Date: 9 June 2011
- Venue: Herts Sports Village, Hatfield
- Player of the Match: Layla Guscoth
- Attendance: 1,000

The 2011 Netball Superleague Grand Final featured Hertfordshire Mavericks and Surrey Storm. Mavericks would win their second title. This was Mavericks sixth successive grand final while Surrey Storm's were making their debut appearance. Between 2011 and 2016 Surrey Storm would play in five out of the six Netball Superleague grand finals. However in their first three they finished as runners up. In 2011 they lost 57–46 to Mavericks.

== Match summary ==
9 June 2011; 19.30	Hertfordshire Mavericks	57–46	Surrey Storm	Herts Sports Village; Attendance: 1,000; Umpires: Gary Burgess and Louise Travis	Sky Sports
9 June 2011; 19.30	Scoring by quarter: 14–16, 26–27, 41–37, 57–46			Herts Sports Village; Attendance: 1,000; Umpires: Gary Burgess and Louise Travis	Sky Sports
9 June 2011; 19.30	Louisa Brownfield 37/45 (82%); Vicklyn Joseph 13/19 (68%); Monique Wood 7/8 (88%)		Rachel Dunn 41/49 (84%); Tamsin Greenway 3/4 (75%); Gemma Cosentino 2/4 (50%)	Herts Sports Village; Attendance: 1,000; Umpires: Gary Burgess and Louise Travis	Sky Sports

== Teams ==
Head Coach: Maggie Jackson Squads: GS Louisa Brownfield (c); GA Vicklyn Joseph; WA Karen Atkinson; C Rose Morgan-Smith; WD Camilla Buchanan; GD Layla Guscoth; GK Lindsay Keable WA Sasha Corbin; GA Monique Wood; WD Georgia Schmidt; GD Hazel Schofield ? Rachel Mulloy	Head Coach: Mary Beardwood Squads: GS Rachel Dunn (c); GA Tamsin Greenway; WA Gemma Consentino; C Becky Trippick; WD Natalie Seaton; GD Katy Holland; GK Hannah Reid GA Steph Bello ? Rhianne McHale; C/WD/WA Adele Modeste ? Fran Desmond ? Lucy Adams
