= 2010 World Netball Series =

International netball tournament hosted by England

Tournament details
- Host country: England
- City: Liverpool
- Venue: Echo Arena
- Dates: 19–21 November 2010
- Teams: 6

Final positions
- Champions: New Zealand (2nd title)
- Runners-up: England
- Third place: Jamaica

Tournament statistics
- Matches played: 20

The 2010 World Netball Series was the 2nd World Netball Series. England hosted Australia, Jamaica, Malawi, New Zealand and South Africa in a series, played in November 2010, at Liverpool's Echo Arena. South Africa made their series debut in this tournament. After two days of round-robin matches, Jamaica finished top of the ladder. However, in the semi-finals they lost to New Zealand. With a team coached by Robyn Broughton and captained by Maree Bowden, New Zealand went on to win the series for the second time after defeating England 28–26 in the final. Jamaica captain, Simone Forbes, was named tournament MVP.

== Squads ==
Participating teams and rosters
Australia	England	Jamaica	Malawi	New Zealand	South Africa
Caitlin Bassett; Emily Beaton; Erin Bell; Kate Beveridge (c); Shae Bolton; Ashleigh Brazill; Madison Browne (vc); Tegan Caldwell; Chanel Gomes; April Letton; Mary Livesey; Amy Steel	Karen Atkinson (c); Eboni Beckford-Chambers; Louisa Brownfield; Pamela Cookey (vc); Sasha Corbin; Rachel Dunn; Stacey Francis; Tamsin Greenway; Serena Guthrie; Jo Harten; Lindsay Keable; Sonia Mkoloma	Nicole Aiken-Pinnock; Nadine Bryan; Althea Byfield; Jodi-Ann Ffrench-Kentish; Simone Forbes (c); Jhaniele Fowler; Sasher-Gaye Henry; Sasha-Gay Lynch; Malysha Kelly; Tracy-Ann Robinson; Paula Thompson; Vanessa Walker	Joanna Kachilika; Peace Chawinga-Kaluwa (c); Mwai Kumwenda; Sylvia Malenga; Beatrice Mpinganjira; Caroline Mtukule; Linda Munthali; Grace Mwafulirwa; Joyce Mvula; Esther Nkhoma; Towera Vinkhumbo; Mary Waya	Maree Bowden (c); Kayla Cullen; Ellen Halpenny; Charlotte Kight; Camilla Lees; Jessica Moulds; Grace Rasmussen; Rachel Rasmussen; Hayley Saunders; Te Huinga Reo Selby-Rickit; Anna Thompson	Chrisna Bootha; Ilzeri Britz; Erin Burger; Zukelwa Cwaba; Elsunett Du Plessis; Maryka Holtzhausen; Kgomotso Itlhabanyeng; Success Lekabe; Tsakane Mbewe; Amanda Mynhardt (c); Thuli Qegu; Nadia Uys
Coach: Norma Plummer	Coach: Anna Mayes	Coach: Connie Francis	Coach: Edith Kaliati	Coach: Robyn Broughton	Coach: Carin Strauss
Specialist coach: Nicole Cusack	Assistant coaches:	Assistant coach: Annett Daley	Assistant coach: Samuel Kanyenda	Assistant coach: Janine Southby	Assistant coach:

== Round robin stage ==
=== Round 1 ===
19 November 2010	Jamaica	32–30	Malawi
13:40 (GMT)

19 November 2010	England	30–13	South Africa
14:25 (GMT)

19 November 2010	Australia	25–19	New Zealand
15:10 (GMT)

=== Round 2 ===
19 November 2010	New Zealand	29–23	Malawi
18:35 (GMT)

19 November 2010	Jamaica	34–22	South Africa
19:20 (GMT)

19 November 2010	England	25–25	Australia
20:05 (GMT)

19 November 2010	New Zealand	31–16	South Africa
20:50 (GMT)

=== Round 3 ===
20 November 2010	England	26–24	New Zealand
10:05 (GMT)

20 November 2010	Jamaica	32–30	Australia
10:50 (GMT)

20 November 2010	Malawi	28–17	South Africa
11:35 (GMT)

20 November 2010	England	20–27	Jamaica
12:20 (GMT)

=== Round 4 ===
20 November 2010	Australia	34–34	Malawi
14:35 (GMT)

20 November 2010	Jamaica	27–27	New Zealand
15:20 (GMT)

20 November 2010	Australia	39–13	South Africa
16:05 (GMT)

20 November 2010	England	32–29	Malawi
16:50 (GMT)

=== Ladder ===
Pos	Team	P	W	D	L	GF	GA	GD	%	Pts
1	Jamaica	5	4	1	0	152	129	+23	117.83	9
2	England	5	3	1	1	133	118	+15	112.71	7
3	Australia	5	2	2	1	153	119	+34	128.57	6
4	New Zealand	5	2	1	2	126	117	-9	107.69	5
5	Malawi	5	1	1	3	144	144	0	100.00	3
6	South Africa	5	0	0	5	81	162	-81	50.00	0

Qualified for Semi-final 1
Qualified for Semi-final 2
Qualified for 5th/6th place match

== Playoffs ==
=== Semi-final 1 ===
21 November 2010	New Zealand	29–28	Jamaica
13:05 (GMT)

=== Semi-final 2 ===
21 November 2010	England	26–25	Australia
13:50 (GMT)

=== 5th v 6th Playoff ===
21 November 2010	Malawi	25–20	South Africa
14:35 (GMT)

=== 3rd v 4th Playoff ===
21 November 2010	Jamaica	30–29	Australia
15:20 (GMT)

=== Final ===
21 November 2010	England	26–28	New Zealand
16:05 (GMT)

== Final Placings ==
Rank	Team
1st place, gold medalist(s)	New Zealand
2nd place, silver medalist(s)	England
3rd place, bronze medalist(s)	Jamaica
4	Australia
5	Malawi
6	South Africa
