= Moulsham High School =

Location
- Brian Close; Chelmsford, Essex, CM2 9ES; England
- 51.718382°N 0.470363°E

Information
- Type: Academy
- Motto: Enjoy, Enrich, Achieve
- Local authority: Essex
- Specialist: English & Humanities
- Department for Education URN: 136863 Tables
- Ofsted: Reports
- Chair: T Price
- Headteacher: Julia Mead
- Gender: Mixed
- Age: 11 to 18
- Enrolment: 1,662 (2026)
- Houses: Crompton, Knight, Strutt, Marconi and Hawken
- Website: http://www.moulshamhigh.org

Moulsham High School is a co-educational academy secondary school and sixth form for 11 to 18 year olds in Chelmsford, Essex.

As of 2020, the school's most recent graded Ofsted inspection resulted in an overall rating of 'Good', though an ungraded inspection in 2024 said that the school 'may have improved significantly' since the previous graded inspection.

The Headteacher is Julia Mead.

== History ==
The Moulsham High School was built in 1938 as two separate schools, one for senior boys, and one for senior girls. The schools merged in 1972. The headteachers of the boys' school were Jock Hutchinson (1938 to 1950), Mr. Smith (1950-1972), Hedley Andrews (1972-1991) Dr. C. J. Nicholls (1991-2010) and M. Farmer (2010-2019). For the girls' school, headteachers were Mrs Sayers (1938-1942), Miss Portzi, Miss Howard 1960 and Mrs Golledge.

== Notable former pupils ==
- Alex Hassell, TV actor
- Cameron James, footballer
- Lindsay Keable, netball player
