= Eboni Usoro-Brown =

English netball player (born 1988)

Personal information
- Full name: Eboni Usoro-Brown (Née: Beckford-Chambers)
- Born: 4 February 1988 (age 38) Solihull, England
- Occupation: Netball Player
- Height: 1.85 m (6 ft 1 in)
- School: Gordon's School
- University: University of Bristol; University of the West of England

Netball career
- Playing positions: GK, GD
Years	Club team	Apps
2006-2011	Team Bath	
2011-2014	West Coast Fever	
2015	Adelaide Thunderbirds	
2016-2021	Team Bath	
2022	Queensland Firebirds	
Years	National team	Caps
2008-2022	England	116
Medal record
Women's netball
Representing England
Commonwealth Games
Gold medal – first place	2018 Gold Coast	team
Bronze medal – third place	2010 New Delhi	team
World Netball Championships
Bronze medal – third place	2011 Singapore	team
Bronze medal – third place	2015 Sydney	team
World Netball Series
Gold medal – first place	2011 Liverpool	Fast5
Silver medal – second place	2010 Liverpool	Fast5
Silver medal – second place	2012 Auckland	Fast5

Eboni Usoro-Brown (née Beckford-Chambers; born 4 February 1988) is an English former netball player who played for England and Team Bath as a defender. She was part of the England team which won a historic gold at the 2018 Commonwealth Games.

== Early life and education ==
Usoro-Brown attended Gordon's School in Surrey from 2001 to 2004. She then studied Law at the University of Bristol, graduating in 2009, before completing the LLM degree in 2010 at the same Law School. Usoro-Brown went on to complete the Legal Practice Course at the University of the West of England.

== Club career ==
=== Team Bath ===
Usoro-Brown joined Team Bath in 2006 and was part of the Super League winning squads of 2006, 2007, 2009 and 2010.

=== West Coast Fever ===
She joined Australian club West Coast Fever, based in Perth in 2011 to play under legendary coach Norma Plummer. She was named Fever’s Most Valuable Player for the 2014 and 2015 seasons.

=== Adelaide Thunderbirds ===
Usoro-Brown moved to the Adelaide Thunderbirds for the 2015 season.

=== Team Bath ===
She returned to Team Bath ahead of the 2016 season and captained the Blue and Gold for six seasons until 2021. She announced her pregnancy during the 2020 season but returned for the 2021 season.

=== Queensland Firebirds ===
Usoro-Brown joined the Queensland Firebirds ahead of the 2022 season to give herself the best possible chance of making the 2022 Commonwealth Games squad. She announced her retirement from netball following the games.

== International career ==
Usoro-Brown made her international debut for England in 2008 at the age of twenty against Malawi.

She was part of the English netball team where England went onto host the 2009 World Netball Series and was ultimately her first Championship since her debut. Eboni has also served as a key member of the national team at the 2010 Commonwealth Games where England secured a bronze medal in the team event and also played a key part in clinching a silver medal for England in the 2010 World Netball Series. Eboni also named as one of the members of the English netball team for the 2011 World Netball Championships where England settled for the bronze medal in the team event.

Eboni went onto represent England at the 2014 Commonwealth Games for the second consecutive time at the Commonwealth Games and was part of the netball team which went medalless at the competition finishing fourth. At the 2015 World Netball Championships, she was instrumental in England's third-place finish with a defensive role.

She competed for England at the 2018 Commonwealth Games which is also her third successive CWG Games appearance. At the Gold Coast Commonwealth Games, she was part of the English national netball team which stunned defending Commonwealth Games champion and world champion Australia 52–51 in the team event to secure historic gold medal after a thrilling finish.

Usuro-Brown was selected in England's 12-player squad for the 2019 Netball World Cup.

She announced she would retire from netball following the 2022 Commonwealth Games.

== Personal life ==
She gave birth to her daughter Savannah in August 2020.
