= Hayley Saunders =

New Zealand netball player

Personal information
- Born: 2 July 1989 (age 37) Gore, New Zealand
- Height: 1.79 m (5 ft 10 1/2 in)
- School: St Peter's College, Gore

Netball career
- Playing positions: WD, C
Years	Club team	Apps
2010–present	Southern Steel	14
Years	National team	Caps
2010	FastNet Ferns	
Medal record
Representing New Zealand
World Netball Series
Gold medal – first place	2010 Liverpool	Fastnet
- Updated on 13 December 2010

Hayley Saunders (born 2 July 1989 in Gore, New Zealand) is a New Zealand netball player and member of the Southern Steel team in the ANZ Championship. Saunders first represented Southland in the National Championships from 2007 to 2008, before moving to the University of Otago in Dunedin and playing for Otago in 2009.

After a strong 2009 season, Saunders was selected for the Southern Steel in their 2010 ANZ Championship campaign, making her debut against the Waikato Bay of Plenty Magic. That year she was also selected for the FastNet Ferns to represent New Zealand at the 2010 World Netball Series in Liverpool.
