= Kadeen Corbin =

England, Barbados and Great Britain netball international

Personal information
- Born: 27 November 1991 (age 34) London, England
- Height: 177 cm (5 ft 9 1/2 in)
- Relatives: Sasha Corbin (sister); Asha Philip (cousin)
- University: University of Bath

Netball career
- Playing positions: GS, GA
Years	Club team	Apps
2009—2013	Team Bath	
2013—2015	Hertfordshire Mavericks	
2017	Mainland Tactix	
2018	Team Bath	
2019—2022	Hertfordshire Mavericks	
2023–2024	Team Bath	
2016	Loughborough Lightning	
Years	National team	Caps
2011–2021	England	72
2012	Great Britain	
2023	Barbados	14
Coaching career
- Years: Team
- 2024–2025: U19 Pulse Power
- 2025-: U17 London Pulse
Medal record
Representing England
Commonwealth Games
Gold medal – first place	2018 Gold Coast	Team
Representing Great Britain
World University Netball Championship
Gold medal – first place	2012 Cape Town	Team

Kadeen Corbin (born 27 November 1991) is an English international and Netball Super League player for Team Bath and Hertfordshire Mavericks. She was part of the England squad that won a historic gold at the 2018 Commonwealth Games.

She also played for the Barbados national netball team.

== Early life ==
Corbin was born in London. Her older sister Sasha Corbin is also an English international netball player and their cousin Asha Philip is an Olympic, World and Commonwealth medallist in the 4 x 100m relay.

== Club career ==
=== Team Bath ===
Corbin started her career at Team Bath in 2009. She won her first Netball Super League title in 2013 where they beat Celtic Dragons.

=== Hertfordshire Mavericks ===
In 2013 she joined her sister at Hertfordshire Mavericks. Corbin would make the grand final in 2015 however Mavericks would go on to lose to Surrey Storm.

=== Mainland Tactix ===
In 2016 it was announced Corbin would be moving to New Zealand to join Mainland Tactix for the 2017 ANZ Premiership season.

=== Team Bath ===
She returned to Team Bath for the 2018 season.

=== Hertfordshire Mavericks ===
Corbin moved to Mavericks for the 2019 season, joining back up with her sister.

=== Team Bath ===
Corbin re-joined Team Bath for the 2023 season where she would be a player and also a technical coach for the team. She played in the sides last ever Super League match against Cardiff Dragons, after it was announced that Team Bath was not offered a contract in the relaunched 2025 Netball Super League. During Team Baths all star game in June 2024 Corbin tore her ACL.

== International career ==
Corbin made her debut against New Zealand back in 2011. She was part of the squad that place fourth at the 2014 Commonwealth Games in Glasgow and won a historic gold medal at the 2018 Commonwealth Games in Australia. She has also featured in the teams for the South Africa Series in 2019, the 2020 Netball Nations Cup and the 2017 & 2020 Taini Jamison Trophy Series.

Corbin was awarded her 50th cap for England in November 2017.

In 2023 she switched nationalities to represent Barbados at the 2023 Netball World Cup alongside her sister Sasha Corbin.

== Coaching career ==
In 2024 Corbin was announced as the U19 Head Coach of Pulse Power, an extension academy of London Pulse which was set-up to cover the South/South East region which previously covered by Surrey Storm.

== Honours ==
=== England ===
- Commonwealth Games: 2018
- Netball Nations Cup: Bronze: 2020

=== Team Bath ===
- Netball Super League: 2009–10

=== Hertfordshire Mavericks ===
- Netball Super League: Runner up: 2015
