= Figleaves =

British online clothing retailer

- Industry: Clothing
- Founded: 1998
- Founder: Daniel Nabarro; Michael Ross
- Headquarters: Stevenage (HQ), United Kingdom
- Area served: United Kingdom and Worldwide
- Products: Underwear, sleepwear, swimwear
- Number of employees: 200+
- Parent: N Brown Group
- Website: figleaves.com

Figleaves.com is a UK-based online lingerie retailer established by Daniel Nabarro and former McKinsey & Co manager Michael Ross in 1998 and purchased by N Brown Group in 2010.

== Company history ==
Figleaves was founded in 1998 by entrepreneur Daniel Nabarro and former McKinsey & Co manager Michael Ross. At launch, it was the first internet retailer to specialise in lingerie, and one of the first to target a female-only market. In 2002 the company started selling in the US. In 2005 the private equity group Balderton Capital bought an almost 40% stake, and in 2010 the company was purchased by N Brown Group in 2010 for £11.5 million. The company did not turn a profit in the UK until 2012, 14 years after it launched and two years after it was acquired by N Brown Group. In Feb 2021 Figleaves.com announced the website would close and be absorbed into SimplyBe.co.uk.

== Management ==
Julia Reynolds, a former Tesco executive who had previously started Tesco's clothing brand F&F, was the chief executive from 2008 until 2011 when she left to join Blacks. Initially, she was not replaced, but her responsibilities were divided between the commercial director, operations director, and product and brand director. Since 2016 the company CEO has been Miriam Lahage, who had previously built and led a number of multi-channel businesses in the US and Europe.

== Operations ==
Lingerie makes up 50% of sales, swimwear 40% and nightwear 10%. Figleaves also sells its own-brand clothing through JD Williams, part of the N Brown Group, as well as on Amazon and eBay. Figleaves' head office is in Stevenage, Hertfordshire. They also have a warehouse and customer service centre in Haverhill, Suffolk.
