= Chioma Matthews =

English female athlete

Chioma Matthews (née Ezeogu, born 12 March 1981) is an English female athlete who competes in the triple jump event and also played netball for England. She has a personal best distance of 13.53 metres in the triple jump.

== Netball career ==
Matthews, playing for Brunel Hurricanes, was part of the inaugural Netball Superleague formed in 2005. She then went on to compete in the sport of netball for England at the 2006 Commonwealth Games in Melbourne, Australia and won a bronze medal.

== Athletics career ==
Matthews switched sports to athletics at the relatively late age of 28 and competed at the 2014 Commonwealth Games in Glasgow, Scotland in the triple jump finishing 8th.
