= Yorkshire Jets =

Former Netball Superleague team

- Association: England Netball
- Founded: 2005
- Disbanded: 2016
- Based in: Leeds Beckett University
- Regions: Yorkshire
- Home venue: Headingley Campus; Leeds Beckett University
- League: Netball Superleague
Uniform
Uniform

Yorkshire Jets were an English netball team based at Leeds Beckett University. Their senior team played in the Netball Superleague. Between 2005–06 and 2011 they played as Leeds Met Carnegie or simply Leeds Carnegie. Together with the men's basketball, women's basketball, men's association football, women's association football and rugby union teams, the netball team was one of several sports teams associated with the Carnegie School of Physical Education, now part of Leeds Beckett University, that used the Leeds Carnegie brand name. In 2005–06, Leeds Carnegie were founder members of the Netball Superleague. As Leeds Carnegie, their best Superleague performance came in 2008–09, when they finished fourth. Between 2012 and 2016 they played as Yorkshire Jets. Their best Superleague performance as Yorkshire Jets came in 2015 when they again finished fourth. In June 2016 England Netball announced that Jets had lost their place in the Superleague and the franchise was subsequently wound up.

== History ==
=== Leeds Carnegie ===
In 2005, Leeds Met Carnegie were named as the Yorkshire franchise in the new Netball Superleague. Together with Brunel Hurricanes, Celtic Dragons, Team Northumbria, Galleria Mavericks, Northern Thunder, Loughborough Lightning and Team Bath, Leeds Met Carnegie were founder members of the league. Future England national netball team manager, Tracey Neville played for Leeds Carnegie during the 2007–08 season.

Leeds Carnegie enjoyed their best season in the Superleague in 2008–09 when, with a team that included Ama Agbeze, they qualified for the play-offs and finished fourth overall. Other players from the Leeds Carnegie era included Carla Dziwoki, Rachel Beale, Natalie Haythornthwaite and Natalie Panagarry.

=== Yorkshire Jets ===
In 2012 Leeds Carnegie were rebranded as Yorkshire Jets. Jets enjoyed their best season in the Superleague in 2015. During the regular season they finished third after winning ten games, six points ahead of fourth placed Hertfordshire Mavericks. In the semi-finals they lost 76–60 to Surrey Storm. They eventually finished fourth overall after losing to Manchester Thunder in the 3rd/4th place play off. Natalie Haythornthwaite was subsequently named as the 2015 Netball Superleague Player of the Season. Stacey Francis captained Jets during the 2016 season. Other members of the 2016 squad included Vanes-Mari Du Toit. 2016 proved to be Yorkshire Jets final season in the Netball Superleague. In June 2016 England Netball announced that Jets had lost their place in the league and the franchise was subsequently wound up.

== Home venues ==
As Leeds Carnegie, the team's main home venue was Headingley Campus at Leeds Beckett University. After becoming Yorkshire Jets and forming a partnership with Welcome to Yorkshire, the team also began to play home games at other venues across Yorkshire. These included the English Institute of Sport, Sheffield, the Hull Sports Arena and the University of Huddersfield.

== Notable former players ==
=== Internationals ===
England

- Ama Agbeze
- Stacey Francis
- Natalie Haythornthwaite
- Tracey Neville
- Natalie Panagarry

Australia

- Carla Dziwoki

South Africa

- Vanes-Mari Du Toit

== Head coaches ==
Coach	Years
(England) Anna Newell Carter	2007–2016
