= Stacey Francis-Bayman =

England netball international

Personal information
- Full name: Stacey Jayne Francis-Bayman
- Born: 1 January 1988 (age 38) Birmingham, West Midlands
- Height: 1.80 m (5 ft 11 in)
- Spouse: Sara Bayman (m. 2020)
- Relative: Kevin Francis (father)
- School: North Bromsgrove High School
- University: University of Bath; Cardiff Metropolitan University

Netball career
- Playing positions: GD, WD, GK
Years	Club team	Apps
2002–2005	Ryland	
2005–2011	Team Bath	
2011–2012	Canterbury Tactix	
2012–2015	Team Bath	
2015–2016	Yorkshire Jets	
2016–	West Coast Fever	
2017	→ Surrey Storm	
2018	→ Team Bath	
2019	→ Team Bath	
Years	National team	Caps
2010–2022	England	73
Medal record
Representing England
Commonwealth Games
Bronze medal – third place	2010 Delhi	Team
Netball World Cup
Bronze medal – third place	2011 Singapore	Team
Bronze medal – third place	2015 Sydney	Team
Fast5 Netball World Series
Silver medal – second place	2010 Liverpool	Team
Gold medal – first place	2011 Liverpool	Team
Silver medal – second place	2012 Auckland	Team
- Updated on 29 April 2020

Stacey Francis-Bayman (née Francis, born 1 January 1988) is a former England netball international. She was a member of the England teams that won bronze medals at the 2010 Commonwealth Games and at the 2011 and 2015 Netball World Cups. At club level she has played for both Team Bath and Yorkshire Jets in the Netball Superleague, for Canterbury Tactix in the ANZ Championship and for West Coast Fever in Suncorp Super Netball. Between 2005–06 and 2013 she was a prominent member of the Team Bath squad as they won five Superleague titles. She played in the 2010 and 2013 grand finals and in both 2011 and 2013 she was named the Netball Superleague Player of the Season. In 2017 she was inducted into the University of Bath/Team Bath Hall of Fame for Sport.

== Early life, family and education ==
Stacey is the daughter of Kevin Francis, a former professional footballer, and his wife, Sharon. She has a sister, Keisha. In her youth she played both association football and basketball before concentrating on netball. When Stacey was 17 her family emigrated to Canada. Stacey opted to remain in England to complete her education and pursue her netball career.

Stacey is originally from Bromsgrove and attended North Bromsgrove High School. From aged 14 she began playing for the Bromsgrove-based Ryland Netball Club. Between 2006 and 2009 she attended the University of Bath where she gained a BSc in Sports Performance. Between 2009 and 2013 she attended Cardiff Metropolitan University where she completed an MA in English.

== Playing career ==
=== Netball Superleague ===
Team Bath

Francis began her senior career in 2005 with Team Bath, making two appearances during their final Super Cup campaign. In 2005–06, aged just 17, she was the youngest member of Team Bath's inaugural Netball Superleague squad. Between 2005–06 and 2013 she was a prominent member of the Team Bath squad as they won five Superleague titles. She was player of the match in the 2010 Netball Superleague Grand Final and made a second grand final appearance in 2013. In both 2011 and 2013 she was named the Netball Superleague Player of the Season. In 2017 she was inducted into the University of Bath/Team Bath Hall of Fame for Sport. In both 2018 and 2019 Francis returned to play for Team Bath as a guest in the British Fast5 Netball All-Stars Championship.

Yorkshire Jets

In 2015, after ten seasons playing for Team Bath, Francis joined Yorkshire Jets. She subsequently captained Jets during the 2016 Netball Superleague season.

Surrey Storm

In 2017 Francis played for Surrey Storm as a guest in the British Fast5 Netball All-Stars Championship.

=== Australia and New Zealand ===
Canterbury Tactix

In 2011 Francis joined Canterbury Tactix. Her team mates at Tactix included fellow England international, Joanne Harten. However Francis missed half the 2012 ANZ Championship season through injury.

West Coast Fever

After playing for England in the 2016 Netball Quad Series, Francis was approached by West Coast Fever of the Suncorp Super Netball. Francis played for West Coast Fever in the 2018 Suncorp Super Netball grand final.

=== England ===
Francis made her senior debut for England in September 2010 during an away series against Jamaica. She had previously represented England at under-17, under-19 and under-21 levels. She was subsequently a member of the England teams that won bronze medals at the 2010 Commonwealth Games and at the 2011 and 2015 Netball World Cups. She was also a member of the England team that won the 2011 World Netball Series. Francis made her 50th senior England appearance at the 2015 Netball Europe Open Championships in a match against Wales.

Tournaments	Place
2009 World Netball Series	4th
2010 Commonwealth Games	3rd place, bronze medalist(s)
2010 World Netball Series	2nd place, silver medalist(s)
2011 World Netball Championships	3rd place, bronze medalist(s)
2011 Taini Jamison Trophy Series	2nd
2011 World Netball Series	1st place, gold medalist(s)
2012 Fast5 Netball World Series	2nd place, silver medalist(s)
2013 Fast5 Netball World Series	6th
2014 Commonwealth Games	4th
2014 Taini Jamison Trophy Series	2nd
2015 Netball Europe Open Championships	1st
2015 Netball World Cup	3rd place, bronze medalist(s)
2016 Netball Quad Series	3rd
2017 Netball Quad Series (August/September)	3rd
2017 Taini Jamison Trophy Series	2nd
2018 Netball Quad Series (January)	2nd
2019 South Africa England netball series	n/a
2020 Netball Nations Cup	3rd

== Personal life ==
Francis is in a relationship with her former Team Bath and England teammate, Sara Bayman. The couple got engaged in 2018 and married on 29 December 2020.

== Honours ==
England

- Fast5 Netball World Series
  - Winners: 2011: 1
  - Runners up : 2010, 2012: 2

Team Bath

- Netball Superleague
  - Winners: 2005–06, 2006–07, 2008–09, 2009–10, 2013: 5

West Coast Fever

- Suncorp Super Netball
  - Runners up : 2018: 1

Individual

- Netball Superleague Player of the Season
  - 2011, 2013: 2
