= Geva Mentor =

England netball international

Geva Mentor CBE
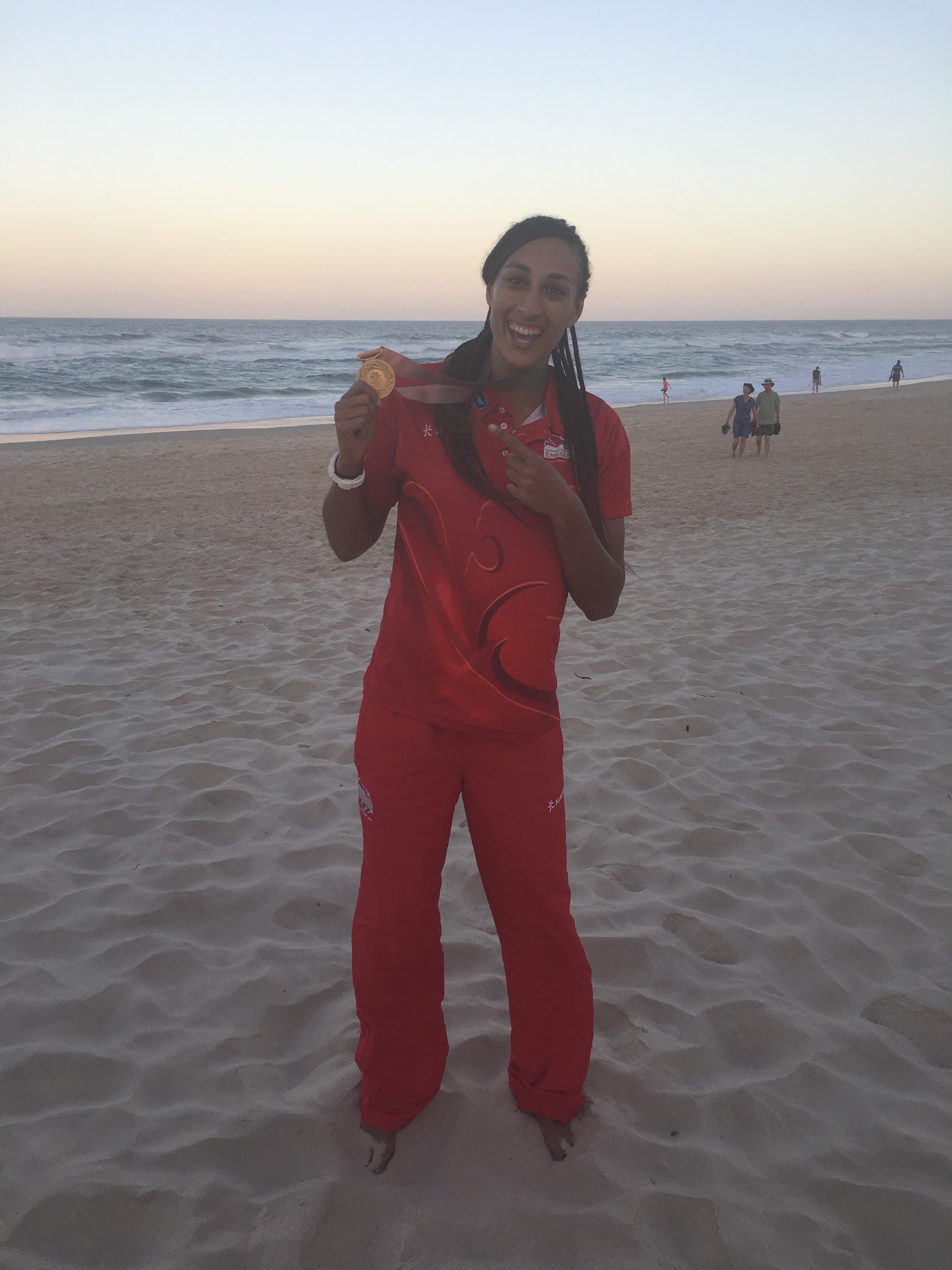
- Geva Mentor with her 2018 Commonwealth Games gold medal.

Personal information
- Full name: Geva Kate Mentor
- Born: 17 September 1984 (age 42) Bournemouth, England
- Height: 1.91 m (6 ft 3 in)
- School: St Peter's Catholic School
- University: Swinburne University of Technology

Netball career
- Playing positions: GK, GD, WD
Years	Club team	Apps
2001–2007	Team Bath	60+
2008–2010	Adelaide Thunderbirds	46
2009–2010	→ Surrey Storm	14
2011–2016	Melbourne Vixens	83
2017–2018	Sunshine Coast Lightning	33
2019–2023	Collingwood Magpies	42
2024-2025	Leeds Rhinos 32	
Years	National team	Caps
2001–2023	England	175
Medal record
Representing England
Commonwealth Games
Gold medal – first place	2018 Gold Coast	Team
Bronze medal – third place	2006 Melbourne	Team
Bronze medal – third place	2010 Delhi	Team
Netball World Cup
Bronze medal – third place	2011 Singapore	Team
Bronze medal – third place	2015 Sydney	Team
Bronze medal – third place	2019 Liverpool	Team
Silver medal – second place	2023 Cape Town	Team
Fast5 Netball World Series
Gold medal – first place	2017 Melbourne	Team

Geva Kate Mentor CBE (born 17 September 1984) is a former England netball international and current Netball Super League player for Leeds Rhinos Netball. She has competed for England in six Commonwealth Games, winning a historic gold medal at the 2018 Commonwealth Games. She was also a member of the England teams that won the bronze medal at the 2006 and 2010 Commonwealth Games and at the 2011, 2015 and 2019 Netball World Cups.

Mentor was a member of the Team Bath teams that won the 2005–06 and 2006–07 Netball Superleague titles. In 2008 she began playing in the ANZ Championship, winning premierships with the 2010 Adelaide Thunderbirds and the 2014 Melbourne Vixens. She captained the Sunshine Coast Lightning teams that won the 2017 and 2018 Super Netball titles.

At the Birmingham 2022 Commonwealth Games she read the Athletes Oath during the Opening Ceremony. In 2019 she was appointed a Commander of the Order of the British Empire for her services to netball.

== Early life, family and education ==
Mentor was born and raised in Bournemouth. She is daughter of Greg and Yvonne Mentor and she has a brother, Raoul. Her mother's family lived in the Dorset area for five generations. Her father was originally from Saint Lucia. She grew up in Boscombe and attended St Peter's Catholic School. She studied for her A-Levels at the University of Bath's Centre of Excellence. She studied for a Bachelor for Education at the Swinburne University of Technology.

== Club career ==
=== Team Bath ===
Between 2001 and 2007, Mentor played for Team Bath, initially in the Super Cup and later in the Netball Super League. In 2004 she was a member of the Team Bath squad that won the Super Cup. In 2005–06, she was a member of Team Bath team that won the inaugural Netball Super League title. Mentor was Player of the Match in the Grand Final when Team Bath retained the title in 2006–07.

=== Adelaide Thunderbirds ===
In 2008, Mentor was one of several England internationals to join the ANZ Championship. Mentor signed for Adelaide Thunderbirds. In 2010, she was a member of the Thunderbirds team that won the premiership. She finished the 2010 season as ANZ Championship Grand Final MVP.

=== Surrey Storm ===
Mentor played with Surrey Storm during the 2009–10 Netball Superleague season. In September 2009 herself and Sonia Mkoloma became the first two players to sign for the rebranded franchise. In March 2010, both Mentor and Mkoloma left Surrey Storm to return to the ANZ Championship.

=== Melbourne Vixens ===
Between 2011 and 2016, Mentor played for Melbourne Vixens in the ANZ Championship. In 2012 she was a member of the Vixens team that were both minor premiers and grand finalists. She was subsequently included in the 2012 ANZ Championship All Star team and was named Vixens' Best and Fairest. In 2013, Mentor was again included in the All Star team. In 2014, Mentor made her 100th ANZ Championship appearance in Round 13 against Adelaide Thunderbirds. Mentor became the first import player to reach 100 games. She subsequently helped Vixens win the 2014 ANZ Championship and was named in a third successive All Star team. In 2014 when the Vixens' Best and Fairest award was renamed the Sharelle McMahon Medal, Mentor became the inaugural winner. In 2015 she shared the award with Karyn Bailey.

=== Sunshine Coast Lightning ===
In 2016 it was announced that Mentor had signed for Sunshine Coast Lightning in Super Netball. In February 2017, she was named captain of the new franchise. She subsequently captained the Lighting teams that won the 2017 and 2018 Suncorp Super Netball titles. Mentor was named the 2017 Suncorp Super Netball Player of the Year. In 2017 and 2018, she was also named as the goalkeeper in the Super Netball Team of the Year. Mentor made her 150th ANZ Championship/Suncorp Super Netball appearance in the 2018 Round 5 match against Adelaide Thunderbirds.

Lightning statistics

Season	Team	G/A	GA	RB	CPR	FD	IC	DF	PN	TO	MP
2017	Lightning	0/0	0	42	0	0	42	97	209	4	16
2018	Lightning	0/0	0	28	0	0	30	121	274	8	16
Career		0/0	0	70	0	0	72	218	483	12	32

=== Collingwood Magpies ===
Since 2019, Mentor has played for Collingwood Magpies in Super Netball. She was named Magpies co-captain ahead of the 2019 season, alongside Madi Robinson. In both 2019 and 2020, Mentor was awarded the Magpies' best and fairest award. In 2020, Mentor was named as the goalkeeper in the Super Netball Team of the Year for a third time. Mentor made her 200th ANZ Championship/Super Netball appearance in the 2021 Round 10 match against Giants Netball.

Magpies statistics

Season	Team	G/A	GA	RB	CPR	FD	IC	DF	PN	TO	MP
2019	Magpies	0/0	0	33	0	0	40	85	217	8	15
2020	2020 Magpies	0/0	0	25	0	0	27	103	182	11	14
2021	2021 Magpies	0/0	0		0	0					
Career		0/0	0		0	0					

=== Leeds Rhinos ===
Mentor returned to the Netball Super League to join Leeds Rhinos after 16 seasons playing in the ANZ Championship and Super Netball.

=== Retirement ===
On 3 June 2025, Mentor announced she would retire from professional netball at the end of that year's Netball Super League season.

== International career ==
Mentor was first selected for the senior England squad in November 2000 when she was aged 15. She was initially spotted by Lyn Gunson and her ability was recognised by England coaches, Julie Hoornweg and Wai Taumaunu. She made her senior debut on 11 July 2001, aged 16, against New Zealand. On her debut she marked Irene van Dyk. In 2002, Mentor featured at her first Commonwealth Games and in 2003 she played at her first Netball World Cup. She was subsequently a member of the England teams that won the bronze medals at the 2006 and 2010 Commonwealth Games and at the 2011, 2015 and 2019 Netball World Cups. She captained England at the 2015 Netball World Cup. Mentor was a prominent member of the England team that won the gold medal at the 2018 Commonwealth Games. In 2019 she was awarded the CBE for her services to netball. In Sept 2022 Geva was conferred an Honorary Doctorate in Sport by The Chancellor of Chichester University. Also in Nov 2022 Mentor was conferred her second Honorary Doctorate in Arts by The Chancellor of Bournemouth University, her home town. In Nov 2022 she officially opened The Geva Mentor Fitness Park, 'a free for all area' on the beachfront of Bournemouth. On 18 May 2023, Mentor announced her retirement from international netball following the conclusion of the 2023 Netball World Cup in Cape Town.

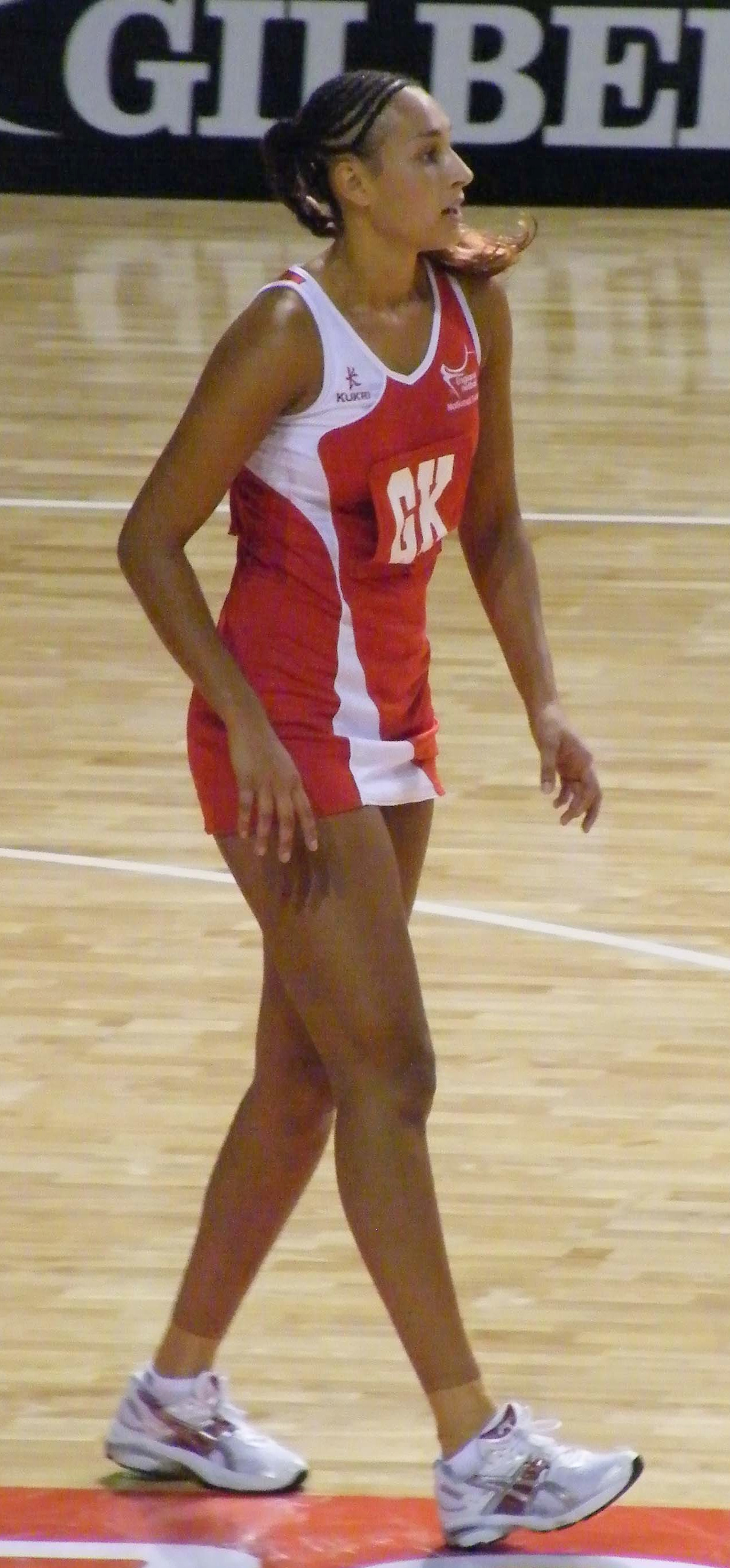
8 October 2008; Geva Mentor playing for England against Australia.

Tournaments	Place
2002 Commonwealth Games	4th
2003 World Netball Championships	4th
2006 Commonwealth Games	3rd place, bronze medalist(s)
2007 World Netball Championships	4th
2008 Taini Jamison Trophy Series	2nd
2009 Taini Jamison Trophy Series^{(Note 1)}	1st
2009 World Netball Series	4th
2010 Commonwealth Games	3rd place, bronze medalist(s)
2011 World Netball Championships	3rd place, bronze medalist(s)
2014 Commonwealth Games	4th
2015 Netball World Cup	3rd place, bronze medalist(s)
2016 Netball Quad Series	3rd
2016 Fast5 Netball World Series	4th
2017 Netball Quad Series (January/February)	3rd
2017 Netball Quad Series (August/September)	3rd
2017 Taini Jamison Trophy Series	2nd
2017 Fast5 Netball World Series	1st place, gold medalist(s)
2018 Netball Quad Series (January)	2nd
2018 Commonwealth Games	1st place, gold medalist(s)
2018 Netball Quad Series (September)	2nd
2019 Netball Quad Series	2nd
2019 Netball World Cup	3rd place, bronze medalist(s)
2021 Taini Jamison Trophy Series	1st
2023 Netball Quad Series	3rd
2023 Netball World Cup	2nd place, silver medalist(s)

Notes

- ^1 Playing for a World 7

== Personal life ==
In 2012 Mentor began a relationship with Lachlan Crawford. The couple were married in December 2015, and in 2018 they divorced. Since 2019, Mentor has had a relationship with Mason Cox, the Australian rules footballer who plays for the Collingwood Football Club.

Since 2015, Mentor has been a dual British and Australian citizen.

In 2019, Mentor released an autobiography, Leap: Making the Jump to Take Netball to the Top of the World.

In 2024, Mentor was announced as the inaugural Performance Director Netball France.

== Honours ==
England

- Commonwealth Games
  - Winners: 2018
- Fast5 Netball World Series
  - Winners: 2017
- Taini Jamison Trophy
  - Winners: 2021
- Netball Quad Series
  - Runners Up: 2018 (Sep), 2019

World 7

- Taini Jamison Trophy
  - Winners: 2009

Sunshine Coast Lightning

- Super Netball
  - Winners: 2017, 2018

Melbourne Vixens

- ANZ Championship
  - Winners: 2014
  - Runners Up: 2012

Adelaide Thunderbirds

- ANZ Championship
  - Winners: 2010

Team Bath

- Netball Superleague
  - Winners: 2005–06, 2006–07
- Super Cup
  - Winners: 2004

Individual Awards

Year	Award
2007	Netball Superleague Grand Final Player of the Match
2010	ANZ Championship Grand Final MVP
2012	Vixens' Best and Fairest
2012	ANZ Championship All Star
2013	ANZ Championship All Star
2014	Sharelle McMahon Medal
2014	ANZ Championship All Star
2014	The Guardian World's Best Netballer
2015	Sharelle McMahon Medal
2017	Super Netball Player of the Year
2017	Super Netball Team of the Year
2018	Super Netball Team of the Year
2019	Commander of the Order of the British Empire (CBE)
2020	Super Netball Team of the Year

In 2022, Mentor was awarded an Honorary Doctorate of Sport by the University of Chichester.
