= Sara Francis-Bayman =

English netball player and coach

Personal information
- Born: Sara Bayman; 23 December 1984 (age 41) Wigan, England
- Height: 181 cm (5 ft 11 1/2 in)
- School: Winstanley College
- University: University of Bath

Netball career
- Playing positions: C, WD
| Years | Club team | Apps |
| 2004, 2006–2009 | Team Bath | |
| ?–2016 | Manchester Thunder | |
| 2016–2017 | Central Pulse | |
| 2017 | UWS Sirens | |
| Years | National team | Caps |
| ?–? | England | 84 |
Coaching career
- Years: Team
- 2018–2021: Loughborough Lightning
- 2023-present: West Coast Fever (Asst.)
Medal record
Representing England
Commonwealth Games
| Bronze medal – third place | 2010 Delhi | Netball |
Netball World Cup
| Bronze medal – third place | 2015 Sydney | Netball |

Sara Francis-Bayman (née Bayman, born 23 December 1984) is an English former netball player and coach from Billinge near Wigan, England. She is currently an Assistant Coach for the West Coast Fever in the Suncorp Super Netball.

== Playing career ==
At a club level, Bayman started her career at Team Bath and has represented Manchester Thunder and UWS Sirens in the Netball Superleague, and Central Pulse in the ANZ Premiership. Francis-Bayman won the Netball Superleague four times as a player. and was captain of Manchester Thunder.

Bayman represented England in their Bronze medal winning 2010 Commonwealth Games campaign but ruptured her knee ahead of the 2011 World Cup. She was part of the 2014 Commonwealth Games squad which failed to medal in Glasgow but went on to be part of the Bronze Medal winning team at the 2015 World Cup.

== Coaching career ==
Francis-Bayman was Head Coach at Loughborough Lightning from 2018, winning Superleague Coach of the Year in her first year. She led the team to a semi-final finish in 2019 and a Superleague title in 2021.

She was assistant coach for Scotland under former England teammate Tamsin Greenway including the Thistles’ 2022 Commonwealth Games campaign in Birmingham.

Following Lightning's Grand Final win in 2021, she took a leave of absence to spend time with her wife in Australia. She was subsequently appointed as an Assistant Coach to the Queensland Firebirds in 2023 before being dropped days before the season opener. After time as an Assistant Talent Coach for Western Australia, she was appointed Assistant Coach at the West Coast Fever for the 2024 season.

== Personal life ==
On 24 December 2018, Sara proposed to her long term partner and ex-England Roses team mate Stacey Francis. The couple met during their playing days and married in 2020.

Francis-Bayman is also known for commentating the England Roses historic 2018 Commonwealth Games Gold Medal match on the BBC, alongside Caroline Barker. She was host of the Netball Nation podcast from 2019 to 2020.
