= Surrey Storm =

English netball team

- Founded: 2001
- Disbanded: 2024
- Based in: University of Surrey; Guildford; Surrey
- Regions: Greater London/ South East England
- Home venue: Surrey Sports Park
- Head coach: Mikki Austin
- Captain: Yasmin Brooks
- Vice-captain: Peace Proscovia, Niamh Cooper
- League: Netball Superleague
- Website: www.surreystormnetball.co.uk
Uniform

Surrey Storm was an English netball team based at the University of Surrey. Their senior team played in the Netball Super League between 2005 and 2024. Between 2001 and 2005 they played in the Super Cup as London Hurricanes. After forming a partnership with Brunel University London, they became the Brunel Hurricanes. In 2005–06 they were founder members of the new Netball Super League. Before the 2009–10 Netball Super League season, they relocated to the University of Surrey and became Surrey Storm. They were Super League champions in 2015 and 2016. In 2023, England Netball announced plans to relaunch the Netball Super League in 2025, with an aim to professionalise the league. During the tender process, the new operating standards for clubs made it unfeasible for Surrey Storm to participate in the league and the franchise disbanded after the 2024 season.

== History ==
=== London Hurricanes ===
Between 2001 and 2005, London Hurricanes, together with five other franchises – Northern Flames, London Tornadoes, Team Bath Force, University of Birmingham Blaze and Northern Thunder – competed in the Super Cup. Players from the London Hurricanes Super Cup era included Abby Teare, Louisa Brownfield, Chioma Ezeogu, Sonia Mkoloma and Ama Agbeze.

=== Brunel Hurricanes ===
By 2005 London Hurricanes had formed a partnership with Brunel University London. They subsequently became known as the Brunel Hurricanes. In 2005 Brunel Hurricanes were named as the Greater London/South East England franchise in the new Netball Super League. Together with Celtic Dragons, Leeds Carnegie, Galleria Mavericks, Team Bath, Loughborough Lightning, Northern Thunder and Team Northumbria, Brunel Hurricanes were founder members of the league. Players from the Brunel Hurricanes era included Chioma Ezeogu and Sonia Mkoloma. Kadeen Corbin also played for Brunel Hurricanes at youth level.

=== Surrey Storm ===
As the 2009–10 Netball Super League season approached, Brunel Hurricanes ended their partnership with Brunel University London, relocated to the University of Surrey and became Surrey Storm. In September 2009, Sonia Mkoloma and Geva Mentor became the first two players to sign for the franchise under the Surrey Storm name. In October 2009 Tamsin Greenway also signed for Surrey Storm. The arrival of Greenway saw the beginning of the most successful era in the history of the franchise. As team captain, player/coach and director of netball, Greenway played a pivotal part in this success. Between 2011 and 2016 Surrey Storm played in five out of the six Netball Super League grand finals. After finishing as runners up in the first three, Surrey Storm won their first Netball Super League title in 2015 and then retained the title in 2016.

In October 2023, England Netball announced plans to relaunch the Netball Super League in 2025, called “NSL 2.0”, with an aim to professionalise the league. During the tender process, the new operating standards for clubs made it unfeasible for Surrey Storm to participate in the league and the franchise disbanded after the 2024 season.

== Senior finals ==
=== Super Cup ===
Season	Winners	Score	Runners up	Venue
2003	London Tornadoes	46–28	London Hurricanes	University of Bath

=== Netball Super League Grand Finals ===
Between 2011 and 2016 Surrey Storm played in five out of the six Netball Super League grand finals. After finishing as runners up in the first three, Surrey Storm won their first Netball Super League title in 2015 and then retained the title in 2016.

Season	Winners	Score	Runners up	Venue
2011	Hertfordshire Mavericks	57–46	Surrey Storm	Herts Sports Village
2012	Northern Thunder	57–55	Surrey Storm	SportHouse
2014	Manchester Thunder	49–48	Surrey Storm	University of Worcester Arena
2015	Surrey Storm	56–39	Hertfordshire Mavericks	Copper Box Arena
2016	Surrey Storm	55–53	Manchester Thunder	Copper Box Arena

== Home venues ==
Brunel Hurricanes played their home games at both Brunel University London and the Guildford Spectrum. The latter was their regular home during the 2007–08 and 2008–09 seasons. Surrey Storm also played at the Guildford Spectrum during 2009–10 before subsequently moving to the Surrey Sports Park at the University of Surrey. Surrey Storm have also played home Super League games at the Copper Box Arena.

== Notable players ==
=== 2024 squad ===
2024 Surrey Storm roster
Players
Coaching staff

Nat.	Name	Position(s)	DoB	Height
(England)	Mikki Austin	C, WA	2 August 1993	1.67 m (5 ft 6 in)
(England)	Sophie Drakeford-Lewis	GA, WA	10 December 1998	1.79 m (5 ft 10 in)
(Uganda)	Peace Proscovia (vc)	GS	1 November 1989	1.93 m (6 ft 4 in)
(England)	Francesca Wells	GS, GA	5 January 1996	1.88 m (6 ft 2 in)
(England)	Amy Flanagan	C, WD	1 November 1993	1.78 m (5 ft 10 in)
(England)	Bethany Dix	C, WA	9 May 1998	1.70 m (5 ft 7 in)
(England)	Ellie Gibbons	GA, WA	9 September 1994	1.77 m (5 ft 10 in)
(England)	Rachael Fee	GD, GK	19 September 2001	1.83 m (6 ft 0 in)
(England)	Amy Howell	GD, WD		–
(England)	Leah Goss	C, WD	27 November 1998	1.73 m (5 ft 8 in)
(England)	Anya Wood	GD, GK		–
(Uganda)	Hanisha Muhammed	GK		–

Head coach

- Mikki Austin

Notes

- (c) – Captain
- (cc) – Co-captain
- (vc) – Vice-captain
- – Injury / maternity leave
- (TRP) – Temporary Replacement Player
Player profiles: Team website
Last updated: 12 September 2023

=== Internationals ===
England

- Ama Agbeze
- Louisa Brownfield
- Lyn Carpenter
- Pamela Cookey
- Kadeen Corbin
- Rachel Dunn
- Chioma Ezeogu
- Tamsin Greenway
- Geva Mentor
- Sonia Mkoloma
- Yasmin Parsons
- Abby Teare

Australia

- Sharni Layton

South Africa

- Sigrid Burger
- Bongiwe Msomi
- Shadine van der Merwe

Northern Ireland

- Niamh Cooper

== Coaches ==
=== Head coaches ===
Coach	Years
(Hong Kong) Denise Holland	2005–2008
(New Zealand) Natalie Swift	2008–2009
(England) Mary Beardwood	2009–2011
(England) Tamsin Greenway	2011–2015
(England) Kathryn Ratnapala	2016

=== Directors of netball ===
Coach	Years
(England) Tamsin Greenway	2015–2016
(New Zealand) Tania Hoffman	2016–2018
(England) Mikki Austin	2018–

== Honours ==
- Netball Super League
  - Winners: 2015, 2016: 2
  - Runners up: 2011, 2012, 2014: 3
- Super Cup
  - Runners up: 2003: 1

== See also ==
- 2015 Surrey Storm season
- 2016 Surrey Storm season
