= Taini Jamison Trophy =

International netball series hosted by New Zealand

- Most recent season or competition: 2025 Taini Jamison Trophy Series
- Sport: Netball
- First season: 2008
- Owner: Netball New Zealand
- Most recent champion: New Zealand
- Most titles: New Zealand (12 titles)
- Broadcaster: Sky Sport (New Zealand)

The Taini Jamison Trophy series is an international netball series hosted by Netball New Zealand. The series traditionally features New Zealand playing a series of test matches against a visiting national team. The trophy is named in honour of Taini Jamison, the former New Zealand head coach. New Zealand won the inaugural 2008 series. A World 7, Jamaica and England have also been series winners. Other participants have included South Africa, Malawi, Fiji and Samoa. As New Zealand and Australia compete for the Constellation Cup, Australia does not compete for the Taini Jamison Trophy.

== History ==
=== Taini Jamison ===
The trophy is named in honour of Taini Jamison, the former New Zealand head coach. Jamison coached New Zealand when they won the 1967 World Netball Tournament. The trophy features a hammerhead shark pattern around the top and base of the trophy, with Taini Jamison's Rotorua Netball Māori motif front and centre. Prior to her death in 2023, Jamison regularly presented the trophy in person to the series winners.

=== Early tournaments ===
New Zealand won the inaugural 2008 series, defeating England 2–1. In 2009, New Zealand played a World 7 team coached by Julie Fitzgerald and captained by Natasha Chokljat. The World 7 won the series 2–1.

=== Controversies ===
In 2018, Jamaica won the series. During a full four team tournament, they twice defeated New Zealand, once in the preliminary rounds and again in the final. However, Netball New Zealand subsequently refused to allow Jamaica to take the actual trophy home, stating that "for insurance purposes... we can't really have it go offshore".

In 2022 complications with passports and visas saw the Jamaica team's arrival in New Zealand delayed. This resulted in the original test series been cancelled. It also saw Jamaica playing with a severely under strength team. Following an investigation, World Netball would later fine Netball Jamaica GBP £5,000 (NZD $9,800) for failing to fulfill the original fixtures planned for the series.

In 2023, before the series started, England faced criticism from Netball New Zealand and New Zealand head coach, Noeline Taurua, for selecting an understrength "B team". However they subsequently defeated New Zealand 55–54 in the opening test.

The 2025 series became involved in controversy when, just eleven days before the first test, New Zealand head coach, Noeline Taurua, was stood down by Netball New Zealand following concerns raised by a group of players.Yvette McCausland-Durie was subsequently appointed as the interim coach for the series.

=== Series ===
Series	Winners	Result	Runners up	Third	Fourth
2008	New Zealand	2–1	England		
2009	World 7	2–1	New Zealand		
2010	New Zealand	2–0 ^{(Note 1)}	Jamaica	Samoa	
2011	New Zealand	2–0	England		
2013	New Zealand	3–0	Malawi		
2014	New Zealand	1–1 ^{(Note 2)}	England		
2015	New Zealand	2–0 ^{(Note 3)}	South Africa	Fiji	
2016	New Zealand	3–0	Jamaica		
2017	New Zealand	2–1	England		
2018	Jamaica	^{(Note 4)}	New Zealand	Malawi	Fiji
2020	New Zealand	3–0	England		
2021	England	2–1	New Zealand		
2022	New Zealand	2–0	Jamaica		
2023	New Zealand	2–1	England		
2024	England	2–1	New Zealand		
2025	New Zealand	3–0	South Africa		

Notes

- ^1 In 2010 the series featured three teams. However Samoa and Jamaica did not play each other.
- ^2 In 2014, New Zealand were declared series winners based on aggregate score.
- ^3 In 2015 the series featured three teams. However Fiji and South Africa did not play each other.
- ^4 The 2018 series was a full four team tournament.
