= Sasha Corbin =

English netball player

Sasha Da Costa
Personal information
- Full name: Sasha Da Costa (Née: Corbin )
- Born: 23 April 1988 (age 38) London, England
- Height: 170 cm (5 ft 7 in)
- Relatives: Kadeen Corbin (sister); Asha Philip (cousin)
- University: University of Bath

Netball career
- Playing positions: WA, C
Years	Club team	Apps
2005	Galleria Mavericks	
2006–2010	Team Bath	
2010–2015	Saracens Mavericks	
2016	Loughborough Lightning	
2017	Northern Mystics	
2018–2023	Saracens Mavericks	
Years	National team	Caps
2007–2018	England	71
2023	Barbados	

Sasha Da Costa (née Corbin; born 23 April 1988) is a former English international and Netball Super League player for Hertfordshire Mavericks and Team Bath. She also played for the Barbados national netball team.

== Early life ==
Corbin was born in London. Her younger sister Kadeen Corbin is also an English international netball player and their cousin Asha Philip is an Olympic, World and Commonwealth medallist in the 4 x 100m relay.

== Club career ==
Corbin played for Hertfordshire Mavericks in the Netball Super League's inaugural season.

=== Team Bath ===
She then moved to Team Bath in 2006 whilst she was studying at the University of Bath where she won the 2006–07, 2008–09 and the 2009–10 titles.

=== Hertfordshire Mavericks ===
Corbin moved back to Mavericks in 2010 and helped the side win the 2011 Super League title. This was Corbin's third consecutive title. She would make the grand final again in 2015 however Mavericks would go on to lose to Surrey Storm.

=== Loughborough Lightning ===
Corbin then did a season with Loughborough Lightning in 2016 however she suffered a cruciate knee injury which cut her season short.

=== Northern Mystics ===
She moved to New Zealand in 2017 to join the Northern Mystics in the ANZ Premiership. The Mystics finished the 2017 season in third.

=== Hertfordshire Mavericks ===
Corbin returned to Hertfordshire Mavericks as captain in 2018 where she played until her retirement from netball at the end of the 2023 season. She was announced as a Brand Ambassador for the rebranded London Mavericks in 2025.

== International career ==
Corbin made her debut with the England national team against Malawi in 2008 She competed at the 2014 Commonwealth Games, where England lost the bronze medal match to Jamaica to finish fourth.

In 2023 she switched nationalities to represent Barbados at the 2023 Netball World Cup alongside her sister Kadeen Corbin.

== Honours ==
=== Team Bath ===
- Netball Super League: 2006–07, 2008–09, 2009–10,

=== Hertfordshire Mavericks ===
- Netball Super League: 2011 Runner up: 2015
