= Guildford Spectrum =

Leisure complex in Guildford, England

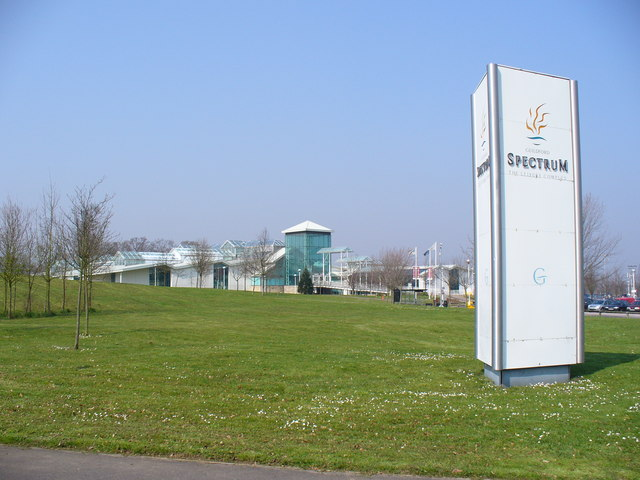

- Location of Spectrum in Surrey
- Address: Parkway
- Location: Guildford
- Coordinates: 51°14′54″N 0°33′46″W
- Owner: Guildford Borough Council
- Operator: Freedom Leisure
- Type: Sports centre

Construction
- Opened: 23 February 1993
- Cost: £28 million

Website
- www.guildfordspectrum.co.uk

Guildford Spectrum is a leisure complex in Guildford, Surrey, England. Owned by Guildford Borough Council, it was opened on 23 February 1993 at a cost of £28 million. It is the home of ice hockey teams the Guildford Flames and the Guildford Phoenix, Aldwych Speed Club (short track speed skating) and other sports clubs. In addition to its large indoor sports arena, it has an Olympic size ice rink, three swimming pools and a high diving pool, a tenpin bowling centre, squash courts and a football/athletics stadium.

The stadium adjoining the complex has 135 seats under cover as well as having a standing capacity of around one thousand.

In 2011, operation of Spectrum was outsourced to Freedom Leisure as part of a ten-year deal with Guildford Borough Council.

== See also ==
- Guildford Flames
- Guildford City FC
