= Rachel Dunn =

British netball player (born 1982)

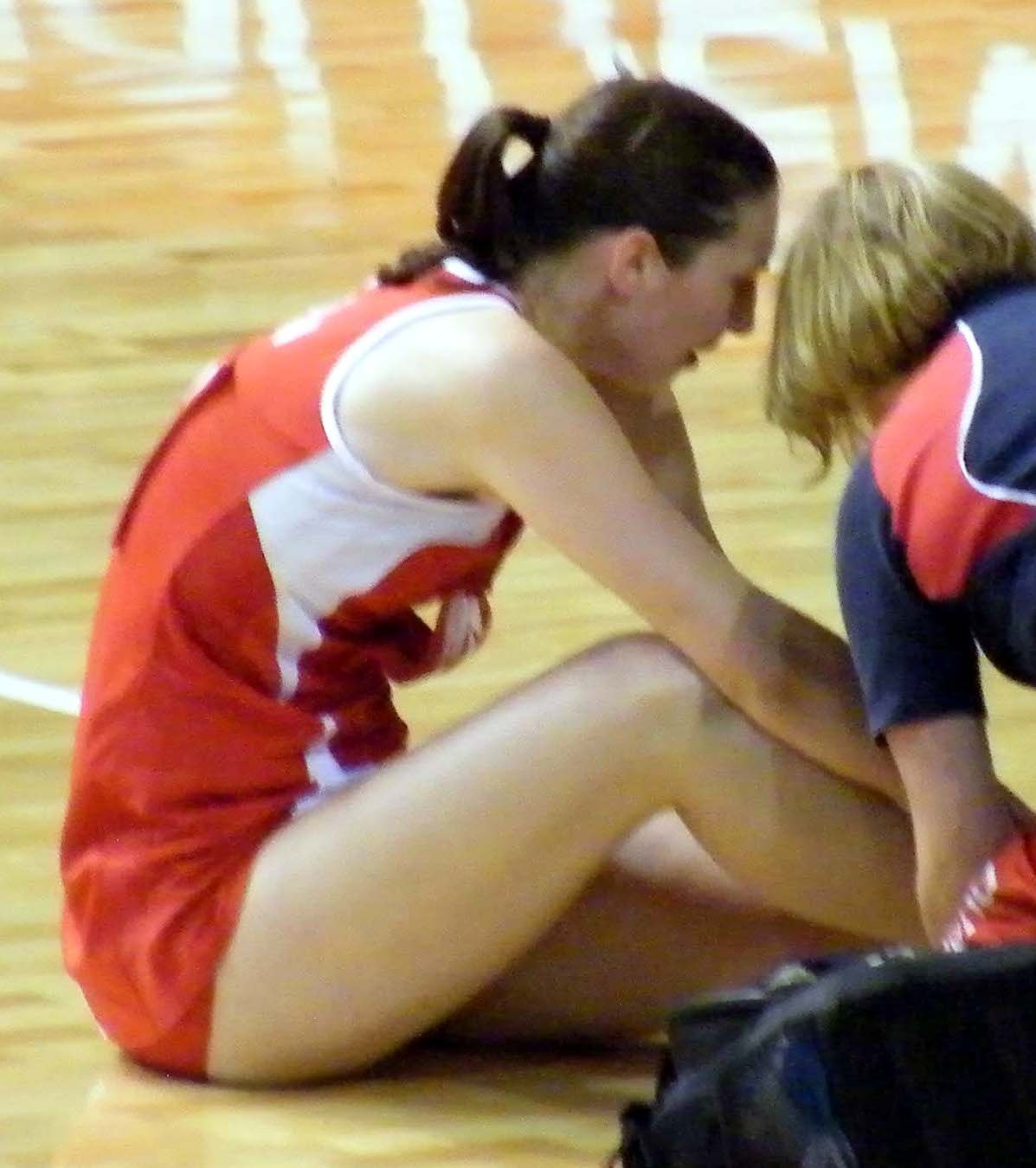
- Rachel Dunn in 2008

Personal information
- Full name: Rachel Margaret Dunn
- Born: 14 November 1982 (age 43) Cambridge, England
- Height: 1.87 m (6 ft 2 in)
- University: University of Bath

Netball career
- Playing positions: GS, GA
Years	Club team	Apps
2003–09	Team Bath	
2008	Canterbury Tactix (TRP)	
2009–2016	Surrey Storm	
2017–2022	Wasps Netball	
2023	Celtic Dragons	
Years	National team	Caps
2004–2019	England	92
Coaching career
- Years: Team
- 2025-present: Birmingham Panthers (Ass)
Medal record
Representing England
World Netball Championships
Bronze medal – third place	2019 Liverpool	Netball
Bronze medal – third place	2015 Sydney	Netball
Bronze medal – third place	2011 Singapore	Netball
Commonwealth Games
Bronze medal – third place	2006 Melbourne	Netball
Bronze medal – third place	2010 Delhi	Netball
World Netball Series
Gold medal – first place	2011 Liverpool	Fastnet
Silver medal – second place	2010 Liverpool	Fastnet
- Updated on May 2025

Rachel Margaret Dunn (born 14 November 1982) is an English former international netball player who was a member of the England teams that won bronze medals at the 2006 and 2010 Commonwealth Games and who has over 250 Netball Super League appearances. She is the current assistant coach of new Super League franchise Birmingham Panthers and head coach of their NXT Gen team.

== Club career ==
Dunn played in the Netball Super League from its beginning in 2005, making over 250 domestic appearances. Dunn has won a record seven Super League titles as a player.

=== Team Bath ===
Dunn started her career at Team Bath, winning titles in 2006, 2007, and 2009. She also played the 2008 season in the Australasian ANZ Championship for the Canterbury Tactix in New Zealand, replacing pregnant Tactix shooter Jodi Brown.

=== Surrey Storm ===
She then moved from Bath to Surrey Storm in 2009, winning back-to-back titles in 2015 and 2016.

=== Wasps Netball ===
She followed her long-time teammate and friend Tamsin Greenway to Wasps Netball in 2017 where they won back-to back titles in 2017 and 2018. Wasps also appeared in the 2019 Grand Final, losing out to Manchester Thunder. Wasps Netball, alongside their partners Wasps Rugby, went into administration in November 2022.

=== Celtic Dragons ===
Dunn played her final domestic games as an injury replacement for Celtic Dragons in 2023 and continued through 2024 as part of the Celtic Dragons coaching set up.

== International career ==
Dunn debuted for the England national netball team in 2004 against South Africa and has over 90 caps for England.

She won a Silver medal at the 2010 World Netball Series. then a Gold medal at the 2011 World Netball Series.

She was a member of the team that won Bronze at the Commonwealth Games in 2006 in Melbourne and 2010 in Delhi.

Dunn played for England in the 2011, 2015 and 2019 Netball World Cups, winning a Bronze medal at each tournament. A fan favourite, Dunn's last appearance for England was in the final minutes of the 2019 Netball World Cup. With the Bronze medal secured, the crowd chanted "We want Dunn" until teammate Jo Harten called time to allow her teammate to enter the court for a final send-off.

== Coaching career ==
In 2025 she was the assistant coach of new Super League franchise Birmingham Panthers and head coach of their NXT Gen team.

== Personal life ==
Dunn started playing netball in Year Four at school. Her elite netball career began when she joined Team Bath while attending Bath University. She balanced her elite netball with a career as a genetic technologist for the NHS.

== Honours ==
=== England ===
- Commonwealth Games: Bronze: 2006, 2010
- Netball World Cup: Bronze: 2011, 2015, 2019
- Fast5 Netball World Series: 2011 Silver: 2010

=== Team Bath ===
- Netball Super League: 2006, 2007, 2009

=== Surrey Storm ===
- Netball Super League: 2015, 2016

=== Wasps Netball ===
- Netball Super League: 2017, 2018 Runners up: 2019
