= Karen Atkinson (netball) =

British netball player (born 1978)

Karen Atkinson MBE
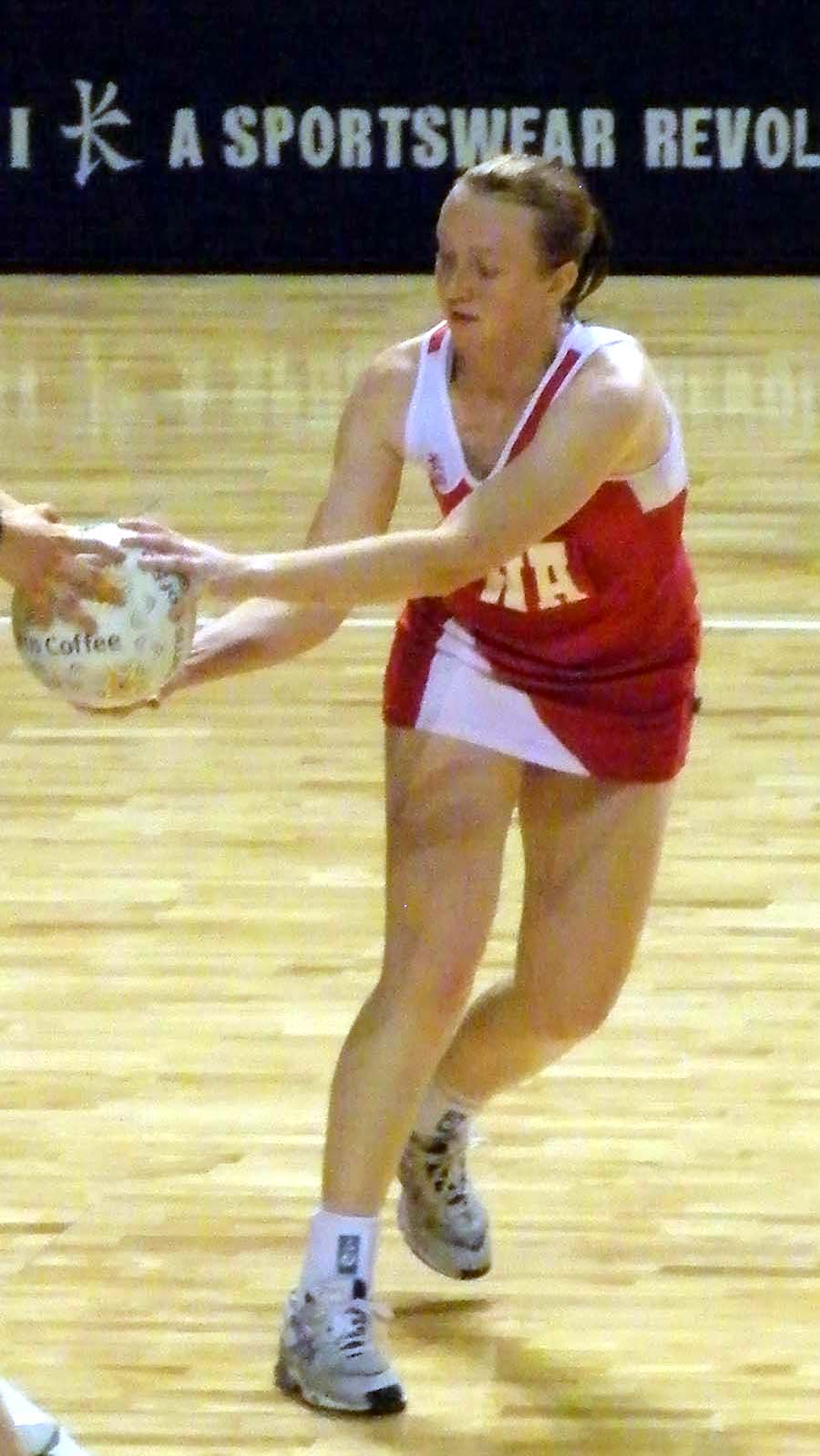

Personal information
- Full name: Karen Helen Atkinson (Née: Aspinall)
- Born: 7 June 1978 (age 48) Wigan, England
- Height: 1.68 m (5 ft 6 in)

Netball career
- Playing positions: WA, C
Years	Club team	Apps
2004	Capital Shakers	
2005–2006	Loughborough Lightning	
2006–2011	Hertfordshire Mavericks	
2008	West Coast Fever	12
Years	National team	Caps
1997–2011	England	
Coaching career
- Years: Team
- Hertfordshire Mavericks
- 2014–2017: Loughborough Lightning
Medal record
Representing England
Netball World Championships
Bronze medal – third place	1999 Christchurch	Netball
Bronze medal – third place	2011 Singapore	Netball
Commonwealth Games
Bronze medal – third place	1998 Kuala Lumpur	Netball
Bronze medal – third place	2006 Melbourne	Netball
Bronze medal – third place	2010 Delhi	Netball
World Netball Series
Silver medal – second place	2010 Liverpool	Fastnet
- Updated on 25 October 2018

Karen Helen Atkinson MBE (née Aspinall; born 7 June 1978) is an English netball coach and former international netball player. Atkinson first represented England in netball in 1994, and was selected for the senior England team in 1997. During her international career, she has won bronze medals at three Commonwealth Games (1998, 2006 and 2010), as well as in the 1999 Netball World Championships. She also won silver with the England team at the 2010 World Netball Series in Liverpool.

In domestic netball, Atkinson played for the Hertfordshire Mavericks in the Netball Superleague, after having played an initial season with the Loughborough Lightning. She also played one season of the National Bank Cup in New Zealand with the Capital Shakers (2004), and one season in the Australasian ANZ Championship with the West Coast Fever (2008).

Atkinson retired from netball in 2011 and has since coached Hertfordshire Mavericks, Loughborough Lightning and the England Fast5 team.

Atkinson was appointed Member of the Order of the British Empire (MBE) in the 2014 New Year Honours for services to netball.
