= Pamela Cookey =

English netball player (born 1984)

Personal information
- Born: 2 September 1984 (age 42) Birmingham, England
- Height: 1.78 m (5 ft 10 in)
- University: University of Bath

Netball career
- Playing positions: GA, GS, WA
| Years | Club team | Apps |
| 2006–2014 | Team Bath | |
| 2009 | Northern Mystics | |
| Years | National team | Caps |
| 2004–2015 | England | |
Medal record
Representing England
Commonwealth Games
| Bronze medal – third place | 2006 Melbourne | Netball |
| Bronze medal – third place | 2010 Delhi | Netball |
World Netball Series
| Silver medal – second place | 2010 Liverpool | Fastnet |
- Updated on 22 November 2010

Pamela Asibie Cookey (born 2 September 1984 in Birmingham, West Midlands) is a former English netball player who mostly played at goal attack (GA).

== Club career ==
In domestic netball, Cookey has played with Team Bath in the Netball Superleague since the competition's inception in 2005, winning two titles in 2005–06 and 2008–09. She also played in the Australasian ANZ Championship in 2009, signing with New Zealand franchise the Northern Mystics.
Pam was announced as a Surrey Storm player joining ahead of the 2015 Super League season. This could see the playing partnership with Tamsin Greenway return once again.

== International career ==
Cookey was a surprise inclusion in the England national netball team as a seventeen-year-old, for the 2002 Commonwealth Games in Manchester, but was unable to participate due to a knee injury. She was also named in the team the following year, but withdrew due to study commitments at the University of Bath.

She made her senior debut with England in 2004 against Australia, and two years later won a bronze medal with the England team at the 2006 Commonwealth Games. She won a second Commonwealth Games bronze medal in 2010, and later that year won silver at the World Netball Series.

== Personal life ==
Cookey was UK Soft Services (buildings facilities management) manager for the Airbus UK site in Filton, Bristol.
