= List of England international netball players =

England netball internationals

The following is a list of notable England netball international players who have represented the national team in international tournaments such as the Netball World Cup, the Commonwealth Games, World Games, the Netball Quad Series, the Taini Jamison Trophy the Fast5 Netball World Series and the Netball Europe Open Championships and in other senior test matches.

== Current squad ==
England roster
Players
Coaches

Name	Pos	DOB	Height	Club	Nat	Caps
Halimat Adio	GK	27 January 1998 (age 28)	1.83 m (6 ft 0 in)	London Pulse	(England)
Imogen Allison	WD, C, WA	24 April 1998 (age 28)	1.80 m (5 ft 11 in)	Nottingham Forest Netball	(England)
Jasmine Brown	GK	26 November 2001 (age 24)	1.88 m (6 ft 2 in)	Manchester Thunder	(England)
Eleanor Cardwell	GA, GS	11 November 1994 (age 32)	1.86 m (6 ft 1 in)	Manchester Thunder	(England)
Amy Carter	C, WD	28 October 1998 (age 28)	1.76 m (5 ft 9 in)	Manchester Thunder	(England)
Ella Clark	GA, GS	8 February 1992 (age 34)	1.90 m (6 ft 3 in)	Loughborough Lightning	(England)
Funmi Fadoju	GD, GK, WD	15 August 2002 (age 24)	1.76 m (5 ft 9 in)	London Pulse	(England)
Sasha Glasgow	GS, GA	19 July 1998 (age 28)	1.87 m (6 ft 2 in)	West Coast Fever	(Australia)
Alice Harvey	GK, GD	3 April 2001 (age 25)	1.90 m (6 ft 3 in)	Loughborough Lightning	(England)
Helen Housby	GA, GS	19 January 1995 (age 31)	1.83 m (6 ft 0 in)	New South Wales Swifts	(Australia)
Natalie Metcalf	WA, GA	9 December 1992 (age 33)	1.74 m (5 ft 9 in)	Manchester Thunder	(England)
Berri Neil	GA, GS	12 February 2003 (age 23)	1.82 m (6 ft 0 in)	Loughborough Lightning	(England)
Natasha Pavelin	GD, WD, GK	22 April 1998 (age 28)	1.83 m (6 ft 0 in)	Nottingham Forest Netball	(England)
Lois Pearson	GA, WA	20 September 1999 (age 27)	1.76 m (5 ft 9 in)	Manchester Thunder	(England)
Jayda Pechova	GK, GD	20 August 2004 (age 22)	1.83 m (6 ft 0 in)	Nottingham Forest Netball	(England)
Izzi Phillips	WD, C	9 April 2006 (age 20)	1.79 m (5 ft 10 in)	London Mavericks	(England)
Alicia Scholes	WA, C	8 May 2001 (age 25)	1.63 m (5 ft 4 in)	London Pulse	(England)
Jessica Shaw	C, WA	17 April 1996 (age 30)	1.70 m (5 ft 7 in)	Loughborough Lightning	(England)
Gracie Smith	C, WD	6 October 2008 (age 18)	1.84 m (6 ft 0 in)	London Pulse	(England)
Olivia Tchine	GS	22 November 2000 (age 25)	1.91 m (6 ft 3 in)	London Pulse	(England)
Fran Williams (c)	GD, GK, WD	23 December 1997 (age 28)	1.85 m (6 ft 1 in)	West Coast Fever	(Australia)

Head coach

- Anna Stembridge

Assistant coach

- Olivia Murphy & Jo Harten

Manager: Paul Dring
Physiotherapist:
Julie Snow

Notes

- (c) – Captain
- (cc) – Co-captain
- (vc) – Vice-captain
- – Injury / maternity leave
- (TRP) – Temporary Replacement Player

== Captains ==
Years	Captains	Series/Tournaments
1949	E. Owen	1949 England Scotland Wales Netball Series
1956	Mary French	1956 away series against South Africa
1950s, 1960s	Jean Robinson	
1963	Josephine Higgins	1963 World Netball Tournament
1967	Marion Lofthouse	1967 World Netball Tournament
1971–1975	Anna Miles	1971 World Netball Tournament; 1975 World Netball Tournament
1975	Judi Heath	
1979	Pat Watson	1979 World Netball Tournament
1983–1987	Jillean Hipsey	1983 World Netball Tournament; 1985 World Games; 1987 World Netball Tournament
1991–1995	Kendra Slawinski	1991 World Netball Championships; 1993 World Games; 1995 World Netball Championships
1996–1998	Fiona Murtagh	1998 Commonwealth Games
1999	Joanne Zinzan	1999 World Netball Championships
2000–2006	Olivia Murphy	2002 Commonwealth Games; 2003 World Netball Championships; 2006 Commonwealth Games
2006–2007	Amanda Newton	2007 World Netball Championships
2008–2011	Karen Atkinson	2008 Taini Jamison Trophy Series; 2010 Commonwealth Games; 2010 World Netball Series; 2011 World Netball Championships
2010–2011	Sonia Mkoloma	2010 Commonwealth Games; 2011 World Netball Championships
2012–2015	Pamela Cookey	2012 Netball Quad Series; 2015 Netball Europe Open Championships
2011, 2014	Jade Clarke	2011 World Netball Series; 2014 Commonwealth Games; 2014 Taini Jamison Trophy Series
2015	Geva Mentor	2015 Netball World Cup
2016–2019	Ama Agbeze	2016 Netball Quad Series; 2017 Netball Quad Series (January/February); 2017 Netball Quad Series (August/September); 2017 Taini Jamison Trophy Series; 2017 Fast5 Netball World Series; 2018 Netball Quad Series (January); 2018 Commonwealth Games; 2018 Netball Quad Series (September)
2019–2022	Serena Guthrie	2019 Netball Quad Series; 2019 Netball World Cup; 2020 Taini Jamison Trophy Series; 2021 Netball Legends Series; 2021 Taini Jamison Trophy Series; 2021 England Jamaica netball series 2022 Netball Quad Series
2019	Yasmin Parsons	2019 Netball Europe Open Championships
2019, 2022–2023	Natalie Metcalf	2019 South Africa series 2022 Commonwealth Games; 2023 Netball Quad Series; 2023 Netball World Cup
2020, 2022	Laura Malcolm	2020 Taini Jamison Trophy Series; 2022 Uganda Series
2022	Imogen Allison	2022 Uganda Series
2023	Layla Guscoth	2023 Netball World Cup
2023	Halimat Adio	2023 Taini Jamison Trophy Series
2023	Sophie Drakeford-Lewis	2023 Taini Jamison Trophy Series
2023	Razia Quashie	2023 Fast5 Netball World Series
2024–	Fran Williams	2024 Netball Nations Cup; 2024 Taini Jamison Trophy Series 2025 Netball Nations Cup

== England Netball's Hall of Fame ==
The following England netball internationals have been inducted into England Netball's Hall of Fame.

Inducted	Player	Appearances	Years
2001	Mary Thomas		1949
2001	Kendra Slawinski	128	1983–1995
2001	Mary French		1949–1957
2005	Anne Stephenson		1960s
2007	Colette Thomson	89	1975–198x
2008	Amanda Newton	100	1996–2008
2009	Karen Atkinson	100	1997–2011
2013	Sonia Mkoloma	123	1999–2015
2014	Jade Clarke	208	2003–
2015	Pamela Cookey	114	2004–2015
2015	Geva Mentor	175	2001–2023
2018	Olivia Murphy	95	1997–2006
2018	Tracey Neville	81	1996–2008
2018	Ama Agbeze		2001–
2020	Eboni Usoro-Brown	116	2008–2022
2020	Joanne Harten	117	2007–2023
2020	Maggie Jackson		1984–1987

== National team head coaches ==
The following England netball internationals subsequently served as head coach of the national team.

Name	Player apps	Player years	Coach years
Mary French		1949–1957	1967–1975
Maggie Jackson		1984–1987	2010
Colette Thomson	89	1975–198x	2011
Tracey Neville	81	1996–2008	2015–2019
Jess Thirlby		2000–2006	2019–

== Major tournament winners ==
=== Fast5 Netball World Series ===
==== 2011 ====
At the 2011 World Netball Series, with a team coached by Anna Mayes and captained by Jade Clarke, England defeated New Zealand 33–26 in the final to win their first major tournament. The following England netball internationals were members of that team.

Player	Appearances	Years
Sara Bayman		
Eboni Beckford-Chambers	116	2008–2022
Jade Clarke	208	2003–
Pamela Cookey	114	2004–2015
Kadeen Corbin	72	2011–2021
Sasha Corbin	71	2007–2019
Emma Dovey		
Rachel Dunn	92	2004–
Stacey Francis	73	2010–
Serena Guthrie	110	2008–2022
Joanne Harten	117	2007–2023
Laura Malcolm	61	2012–

==== 2017 ====
At the 2017 Fast5 Netball World Series, with a team coached by Tracey Neville and captained by Ama Agbeze, England won the series for a second time. In the final they defeated Jamaica 34–29. The following England netball internationals were members of that team.

Player	Appearances	Years
Ama Agbeze		2001–
Beth Cobden	35	2016–
Rachel Dunn	92	2004–
Serena Guthrie	110	2008–2022
Joanne Harten	117	2007–2023
Natalie Haythornthwaite	86	2015–
Helen Housby	102	2014–
Gabriella Marshall	8	2017–
Geva Mentor	175	2001–2023
Natalie Panagarry	17	2016–

=== Commonwealth Games ===
==== 2018 ====
The following England netball internationals were members of the squad that won the gold medal at the 2018 Commonwealth Games. At the 2018 BBC Sports Personality of the Year Awards, they were also named Team of the Year.

Player	Appearances	Years
Ama Agbeze		2001–
Eboni Beckford-Chambers	116	2008–2022
Jade Clarke	208	2003–
Beth Cobden	35	2016–
Kadeen Corbin	72	2011–2021
Jodie Gibson	25	2013–
Serena Guthrie	110	2008–2022
Joanne Harten	117	2007–2023
Natalie Haythornthwaite	86	2015–
Helen Housby	102	2014–
Geva Mentor	175	2001–2023
Chelsea Pitman	52	2017–2023

=== Taini Jamison Trophy ===
==== 2021 ====
England won the 2021 Taini Jamison Trophy Series. It was the first time they won the Taini Jamison Trophy. It was also the first time that England had won a series in New Zealand. The England team were coached by Jess Thirlby and captained by Serena Guthrie. The following England netball internationals were members of that team.

Player	Appearances	Years
Imogen Allison	43	2020–
Eleanor Cardwell	70	2016–
Ella Clark	5	2016–
Jade Clarke	208	2003–
Beth Cobden	35	2016–
Rhea Dixon		
Sophie Drakeford-Lewis	25	2017–
George Fisher	22	2017–
Layla Guscoth	60	2012–
Serena Guthrie	110	2008–2022
Hannah Joseph	17	2016–
Geva Mentor	175	2001–2023
Laura Malcolm	61	2012–
Vicki Oyesola	9	2017–
Fran Williams	43	2018–

==== 2024 ====
England won the 2024 Taini Jamison Trophy Series, their second title. After winning the two opening tests, England eventually won the series 2–1. The winning England team was coached by Jess Thirlby and captained by Fran Williams.

Player	Appearances	Years
Imogen Allison	52	2020–
Amy Carter	20	2020–
Beth Cobden	44	2016–
Funmi Fadoju	36	2022-
Alice Harvey	9	2022
Helen Housby	110	2014-
Hannah Joseph	19	2016–
Natalie Metcalf	86	2015
Berri Neil	9	2023-
Lois Pearson	9	2024-
Razia Quashie	24	2018-
Ellie Rattu	12	2022-
Olivia Tchine	24	2022-
Fran Williams (c)	52	2018–

=== Netball Nations Cup ===
==== 2025 ====
England won the 2025 Netball Nations Cup. The team was team coached by Jess Thirlby and captained by Fran Williams, and defeated South Africa 61–55 in the final. It proved sixth time lucky for England. Since the Nations Cup/Quad Series was established in 2012, England had finished as runners up five times.

Player	Appearances	Years
Halimat Adio		
Imogen Allison	52	2020–
Amy Carter	20	2020–
Beth Cobden	44	2016–
Zara Everitt	3	
Funmi Fadoju	36	2022-
Berri Neil	9	2023-
Razia Quashie	24	2018-
Ellie Rattu	12	2022-
Paige Reed		
Alicia Scholes	5	2023-
Olivia Tchine	24	2022-
Emma Thacker		
Fran Williams (c)	52	2018–

== Dual internationals ==
The following England netball internationals also represented other national teams in international netball.

Player	England Apps	Years	Other team	Appearances	Years
Kadeen Corbin	72	2011–2021	Barbados		2023
Sasha Corbin	71	2007–2019	Barbados		2023
Shaunagh Craig		2013	Northern Ireland		2019–
Lynne Macdonald		1975	New Zealand	2	1969
Jo Morrison		2002–	New Zealand	7	1997–1998
Chelsea Pitman	52	2017–2023	Australia	15	2011–2012
Kate Shimmin	5	2019–	Australia		2014, 2016
