= 2020 Taini Jamison Trophy Series =

International netball series

Tournament details
- Host country: New Zealand
- City: Hamilton
- Venue: Claudelands Arena
- Dates: 28 October–1 November 2020
- Teams: 2
- TV partner(s): Sky Sport (New Zealand); Sky Sports (UK/Ireland)

Final positions
- Champions: New Zealand (9th title)
- Runners-up: England

Tournament statistics
- Matches played: 3
- Top scorer(s): Maia Wilson; 116/127 (91%)

The 2020 Taini Jamison Trophy Series, also known as the 2020 Cadbury Netball Series, was the 11th Taini Jamison Trophy series. It featured New Zealand playing England in three netball test matches, played in late October and early November 2020. All three tests were played at Hamilton's Claudelands Arena. It was the first international netball test series to be staged since the start of the COVID-19 pandemic. New Zealand won the series after winning the opening two tests, 58–45 and 54–47 respectively. They subsequently won the third test 62–47 and finished 3–0 series winners. The New Zealand team were coached by Noeline Taurua and captained by Ameliaranne Ekenasio. England's head coach, Jess Thirlby, could not travel to New Zealand after testing positive for coronavirus. So Kat Ratnapala coached England for the series. England were co-captained by Serena Guthrie and Laura Malcolm. New Zealand's Maia Wilson finished the series as the top scorer after scoring 116 from 127 with a 91% success rate. The series was broadcast live on Sky Sport in New Zealand and on Sky Sports in the United Kingdom and Ireland.

== Squads ==
=== New Zealand ===
New Zealand roster
Players
Coaches

Name	Pos	DOB	Height	Club	Nat	Caps
Karin Burger	WD, GD, GK	12 April 1993 (aged 27)	1.84 m (6 ft 0 in)	Mainland Tactix
Gina Crampton	WA, C	7 December 1991 (aged 28)	1.74 m (5 ft 9 in)	Southern Steel
Ameliaranne Ekenasio (c)	GA, GS	11 January 1991 (aged 29)	1.86 m (6 ft 1 in)	Central Pulse
Monica Falkner	GA, GS	8 April 1991 (aged 29)	1.81 m (5 ft 11 in)	Northern Stars
Sulu Fitzpatrick	GK, GD, WD	20 August 1992 (aged 28)	1.88 m (6 ft 2 in)	Northern Mystics
Kelly Jury	GK, GD	22 October 1996 (aged 24)	1.92 m (6 ft 4 in)	Central Pulse
Claire Kersten	WD, C	9 July 1989 (aged 31)	1.75 m (5 ft 9 in)	Central Pulse
Shannon Saunders	C, WA	12 October 1990 (aged 30)	1.78 m (5 ft 10 in)	Southern Steel
Whitney Souness	WA, C	12 October 1991 (aged 29)	1.74 m (5 ft 9 in)	Waikato Bay of Plenty Magic
Jane Watson	GK, GD	7 March 1990 (aged 30)	1.81 m (5 ft 11 in)	Mainland Tactix
Maia Wilson	GS, GA	21 September 1997 (aged 23)	1.87 m (6 ft 2 in)	Northern Stars
Samantha Winders	WD, C, WA	5 June 1995 (aged 25)	1.71 m (5 ft 7 in)	Waikato Bay of Plenty Magic

Head coach

- Noeline Taurua

Notes

- (c) – Captain
- (cc) – Co-captain
- (vc) – Vice-captain
- – Injury / maternity leave
- (TRP) – Temporary Replacement Player

Debuts

- Monica Falkner made her senior debut for New Zealand in the opening match of the series.

=== England ===
England roster
Players
Coaches

Name	Pos	DOB	Height	Club	Nat	Caps
Halimat Adio	GD, GK, WD	27 January 1998 (aged 22)	1.83 m (6 ft 0 in)	London Pulse		3
Imogen Allison	WD, C, WA	24 April 1998 (aged 22)	1.80 m (5 ft 11 in)	Team Bath		0
Eleanor Cardwell	GS, GA	11 November 1994 (aged 25)	1.86 m (6 ft 1 in)	Manchester Thunder		27
Amy Carter	C, WD	28 October 1998 (aged 22)	1.76 m (5 ft 9 in)	Manchester Thunder		4
Jade Clarke	WD, C, WA	17 October 1983 (aged 37)	1.74 m (5 ft 9 in)	Wasps Netball		176
Kadeen Corbin	GS, GA	27 November 1991 (aged 28)	1.77 m (5 ft 10 in)	Saracens Mavericks		70
Sophie Drakeford-Lewis	GA, GS	10 December 1998 (aged 21)	1.79 m (5 ft 10 in)	Team Bath		2
George Fisher	GS	30 September 1998 (aged 22)	1.88 m (6 ft 2 in)	Saracens Mavericks		12
Jodie Gibson	GD, WD, GK	30 October 1992 (aged 27)	1.78 m (5 ft 10 in)	Saracens Mavericks		25
Serena Guthrie (cc)	WD, C, WA	5 January 1990 (aged 30)	1.80 m (5 ft 11 in)	Team Bath		98
Laura Malcolm (cc)	C, WD, WA	20 May 1991 (aged 29)	1.75 m (5 ft 9 in)	Manchester Thunder		28
Gabriella Marshall	C, WA	9 April 1996 (aged 24)	1.73 m (5 ft 8 in)	Saracens Mavericks		6
Vicki Oyesola	GD, WD	16 January 1998 (aged 22)	1.80 m (5 ft 11 in)	Loughborough Lightning		4
Yasmin Parsons	C, WA	5 January 1990 (aged 30)	1.70 m (5 ft 7 in)	Surrey Storm		3
Razia Quashie	GK, GD	16 September 1997 (aged 23)	1.85 m (6 ft 1 in)	Saracens Mavericks		12
Fran Williams (vc)	GD, GK, WD	5 January 1996 (aged 24)	1.88 m (6 ft 2 in)	Wasps Netball		13

Head coach

- Kat Ratnapala

Assistant coach

- Colette Thomson

Notes

- (c) – Captain
- (cc) – Co-captain
- (vc) – Vice-captain
- – Injury / maternity leave
- (TRP) – Temporary Replacement Player

Debuts

- Imogen Allison made her senior debut for England in the opening match of the series.

Milestones

- Serena Guthrie made her 100th senior appearance for England in the second test.

== Matches ==
=== First test ===
28 October 2020; 7:30pm (NZT)	Stats	New Zealand	58–45	England
28 October 2020; 7:30pm (NZT)	Stats	Scoring by quarter: 15–10, 32–24, 46–35, 58–45
28 October 2020; 7:30pm (NZT)	Stats	Maia Wilson 34/39 (87%); Ameliaranne Ekenasio 24/26 (92%); Monica Falkner 0/1 (0%)		George Fisher 18/22 (82%); Eleanor Cardwelll 15/17 (88%); Kadeen Corbin 7/9 (78%); Sophie Drakeford-Lewis 5/5 (100%)

=== Second test ===
30 October 2020; 7:30pm (NZT)	Stats	New Zealand	54–47	England
30 October 2020; 7:30pm (NZT)	Stats	Scoring by quarter: 14–12, 23–25, 39–33, 54–47
30 October 2020; 7:30pm (NZT)	Stats	Maia Wilson 38/41 (93%); Ameliaranne Ekenasio 16/18 (89%)		Eleanor Cardwell 19/21 (90%); George Fisher 17/17 (100%); Sophie Drakeford-Lewis 11/14 (79%)

=== Third test ===
1 November 2020; 7:30pm (NZT)	New Zealand	62–47	England
1 November 2020; 7:30pm (NZT)	Scoring by quarter: 12–10, 26–19, 45–35, 62–47
1 November 2020; 7:30pm (NZT)	Maia Wilson 44/47 (94%); Ameliaranne Ekenasio 17/18 (94%); Monica Falkner 1/2 (50%)		George Fisher 26/28 (93%); Eleanor Cardwell 14/17 (82%); Sophie Drakeford-Lewis 7/8 (88%)
