= Sam Bird (netball) =

London Pulse Head Coach and retired England netball international

Personal information
- Full name: Samantha Bird
- Occupations: CEO and Director of Netball for London Pulse
- Height: 5 ft 4 in (1.63 m)
- University: Queen Mary University of London

Netball career
- Playing position: WA
Years	National team	Caps
1990–1994	England	
Coaching career
- Years: Team
- 2005–2013: Hertfordshire Mavericks (Assistant)
- 2014–2015: Hertfordshire Mavericks
- 2016: Severn Stars (Assistant)
- 2017–2018: Severn Stars
- 2019–present: London Pulse

Sam Bird is a former England netball international and the current Director of Netball and CEO of London Pulse. She led London Pulse to their inaugural Netball Super League title in 2025.

== Playing career ==
Bird represented England from under-16 to senior level, but was forced to retire aged 24 due to a knee injury after undergoing seven operations.

== Coaching career ==
=== Hertfordshire Mavericks (2005–2015) ===
Bird joined Hertfordshire Mavericks for the inaugural Netball Super League season in 2005 as an Assistant Coach. She assisted the team through their 2008 and 2011 Super League winning seasons. Bird was promoted to Head Coach in 2014 and led Mavericks to top four positions and the play-offs in the 2014 and 2015 seasons, reaching the 2015 Grand Final where they lost to Surrey Storm. She departed the club in 2015 following 11 seasons.

=== England Netball (2014–present) ===
Bird was named as a national selector for England in 2014 and as a England Netball technical coach for the mid court in 2016.

=== Severn Stars (2016–2019) ===
Bird joined Severn Stars as an assistant coach for their inaugural season in 2016. The following season she was promoted to Head Coach replacing Mo'onia Gerrard, who stepped down at the end of the 2017 campaign.

=== London Pulse (2019–present) ===
In May 2019, Bird was announced as London Pulse's new head coach, succeeding Te Aroha Keenan. She was named as CEO in April 2020. She led the team to a fourth-place finish in 2022 and to the 2023 Grand Final, where they were defeated by Loughborough Lightning. In 2025, Bird guided London Pulse to their first Super League title, defeating Loughborough Lightning 53–45. That season Pulse also topped the regular season table and won the inaugural Netball Super Cup in March.

== Personal life ==
Bird studied at Queen Mary University of London and spent 20 years working as a lawyer for the London Metropolitan Police. She has two children, a son Lewis and daughter Daisy. Bird is also the coach of Turnford Netball Club’s Premier League squad which her daughter plays for.

== Honours ==
=== Head Coach ===
==== London Pulse ====
- Netball Super League
  - Winners: 2025
  - Runners up: 2023

==== Hertfordshire Mavericks ====
- Netball Super League
  - Runners up: 2015
