= Maggie Jackson =

England netball international and coach

Maggie Jackson MBE
Personal information
- Full name: Maggie Jackson

Netball career
- Playing positions: GD, GK
Years	National team	Caps
1984–1987	England	
- 2005–2011: Mavericks
- 2010: England

Maggie Jackson MBE is a former England netball international and netball coach. She was head coach when England were bronze medallists at the 2010 Commonwealth Games. She was Mavericks head coach when they won the 2007–08 and 2011 Netball Superleague titles. In 2012, she was awarded an MBE. In 2020 she was inducted into England Netball's Hall of Fame.

== Playing career ==
=== England ===
Between 1984 and 1987, Jackson represented England. She formed a defensive partnership with Kendra Slawinski and played at the 1985 World Games and the 1987 World Netball Tournament.

Tournaments	Place
1985 World Games	4th
1987 World Netball Tournament	4th

== Coaching career ==
=== Birmingham Blaze ===
During the Super Cup era, Jackson worked with Kendra Slawinski and Colette Thomson at Birmingham Blaze for the first three seasons.

=== Mavericks ===
In 2005, Jackson helped set up the Netball Superleague's Mavericks franchise. Between 2005–06 and 2011, as Head Coach and/or Director of Performance, she led Mavericks to six successive grand finals. She was head coach when they runners up in 2007, and when they were winners in 2008 and 2011. In 2008 she was named NSL Coach of the Year.

=== England ===
In 2004, Jackson joined the England coaching staff. At the 2006 Commonwealth Games she served as an assistant coach to Margaret Caldow. She served as interim head coach at the 2010 Commonwealth Games and at the 2011 World Netball Championships she served as a technical assistant to Sue Hawkins. On all three occasions, England were bronze medallists. In 2012, Jackson was made a Member of the Order of the British Empire. On 1 February 2013, she was presented with her MBE for services to netball by Prince Charles. She should have received the award in November 2012 but was away with the England team at the 2012 Netball Quad Series and 2012 Fast5 Netball World Series.

=== Army ===
In 2016, Jackson coached the British Army netball team.

== Family ==
Jackson is married to David Jackson. They have two children, a son, Tom and a daughter, Kari.

== Honours ==
=== Head coach ===
Mavericks

- Netball Superleague
  - Winners: 2007–08, 2011
  - Runners Up: 2005–06, 2006–07, 2008–09, 2009–10

Individual Awards

Year	Award
2008	Netball Superleague Coach of the Year
2012	Member of the Order of the British Empire
2020	England Netball's Hall of Fame
