= 2011 Taini Jamison Trophy Series =

International netball series

Tournament details
- Host country: New Zealand
- Dates: 3–6 October 2011

Final positions
- Champions: New Zealand (3rd title)
- Runners-up: England

Tournament statistics
- Matches played: 2

The 2011 Taini Jamison Trophy Series, also referred to as the New World Series, was the fourth Taini Jamison Trophy series. It featured New Zealand playing England in two netball test matches, played in October 2011. New Zealand won the opening test 62–40 and the second test 53–32. As a result, New Zealand won the series 2–0. The New Zealand team was coached by Ruth Aitken and captained by Laura Langman. England were coached by Colette Thomson. The two tests were the fifth and sixth test matches that New Zealand and England had played against each other in 2011. This included a 2011 World Netball Championships semi-final.

== Squads ==
=== New Zealand ===
New Zealand roster
Players
Coaches

Name	Pos	DOB	Height	Club	Nat	Caps
Kayla Cullen	GD, WD, C	13 February 1992 (aged 19)	1.83 m (6 ft 0 in)	Northern Mystics		0
Leana de Bruin	GD, GK	9 July 1977 (aged 34)	1.90 m (6 ft 3 in)	Southern Steel
Paula Griffin	GS, GA	11 July 1988 (aged 23)	1.85 m (6 ft 1 in)	Southern Steel
Joline Henry	GD, WD	29 September 1982 (aged 29)	1.83 m (6 ft 0 in)	Northern Mystics
Laura Langman (c)	C, WD	16 April 1986 (aged 25)	1.73 m (5 ft 8 in)	Waikato Bay of Plenty Magic		76
Cathrine Latu	GS, GA	25 October 1986 (aged 24)	1.89 m (6 ft 2 in)	Northern Mystics		0
Liana Leota	C, WA	31 October 1984 (aged 26)	1.68 m (5 ft 6 in)	Southern Steel
Anna Scarlett	GK, GD, WD	15 April 1983 (aged 28)	1.87 m (6 ft 2 in)	Northern Mystics
Anna Thompson	GA, GS	18 June 1986 (aged 25)	1.76 m (5 ft 9 in)	Canterbury Tactix
Sulu Tone-Fitzpatrick	GD, GK	20 August 1992 (aged 19)	1.88 m (6 ft 2 in)	Waikato Bay of Plenty Magic		0
Maria Tutaia	GA, GS	18 February 1987 (aged 24)	1.88 m (6 ft 2 in)	Northern Mystics
Irene van Dyk (vc)	GS, GA	21 June 1972 (aged 39)	1.90 m (6 ft 3 in)	Waikato Bay of Plenty Magic		126

Head coach

- Ruth Aitken

Assistant coach

- Waimarama Taumaunu

Notes

- (c) – Captain
- (cc) – Co-captain
- (vc) – Vice-captain
- – Injury / maternity leave
- (TRP) – Temporary Replacement Player

Debuts

- Cathrine Latu, Kayla Cullen and Sulu Tone-Fitzpatrick all made their senior debuts for New Zealand in the opening test.

Milestones

- Irene van Dyk made her 200th test appearance in the second match. This included appearances for both South Africa and New Zealand.
- Ruth Aitken coached her last home test in the second match.

=== England ===
England roster
Players
Coaches

Name	Pos	DOB	Height	Club	Nat	Caps
Ama Agbeze	GD, GK, WD	31 October 1984 (aged 26)	1.84 m (6 ft 0 in)	West Coast Fever
Eboni Beckford-Chambers	GD, GK	4 February 1988 (aged 23)	1.85 m (6 ft 1 in)	Team Bath
Jade Clarke	WD, C, WA	17 October 1983 (aged 27)	1.74 m (5 ft 9 in)
Kadeen Corbin	GS, GA	27 November 1991 (aged 19)	1.77 m (5 ft 10 in)	Team Bath
Sasha Corbin	WA, C	23 April 1988 (aged 23)	1.70 m (5 ft 7 in)	Saracens Mavericks
Rachel Dunn	GS, GA	14 November 1982 (aged 28)	1.87 m (6 ft 2 in)	Surrey Storm
Gemma Fletcher	GK, GD, WD	(aged 24)	1.78 m (5 ft 10 in)	Team Bath
Stacey Francis	GD, WD, GK	1 January 1988 (aged 23)	1.80 m (5 ft 11 in)	Canterbury Tactix
Tamsin Greenway	C, WA, GA	6 October 1982 (aged 28)	1.76 m (5 ft 9 in)	Surrey Storm
Serena Guthrie	WD, C, WA	5 January 1990 (aged 21)	1.80 m (5 ft 11 in)	Team Bath
Jo Harten	GS, GA	21 March 1989 (aged 22)	1.88 m (6 ft 2 in)	Loughborough Lightning
Rachel Shaw	GA, WA	29 April 1992 (aged 19)	1.78 m (5 ft 10 in)	Yorkshire Jets

Head coach

- Colette Thomson

Notes

- (c) – Captain
- (cc) – Co-captain
- (vc) – Vice-captain
- – Injury / maternity leave
- (TRP) – Temporary Replacement Player

== Matches ==
=== First test ===
3 October 2011	New Zealand	62–40	England	Trusts Stadium
3 October 2011	Scoring by quarter: 18–10, 34–18, 48–27, 62–40			Trusts Stadium
3 October 2011	Irene van Dyk 23/24 (96%); Maria Tutaia; Cathrine Latu 17/17 (100%); Anna Thompson		Jo Harten; Kadeen Corbin; Rachel Dunn	Trusts Stadium

=== Second test ===
6 October 2011	New Zealand	53–32	England	ILT Velodrome; Attendance: 2,500
6 October 2011	Scoring by quarter: 14–5, 29–11, 40–21, 53–32			ILT Velodrome; Attendance: 2,500
6 October 2011	Irene van Dyk 20/21 (95%); Maria Tutaia 9/13 (69%); Cathrine Latu 13/13 (100%); Paula Griffin 11/17 (65%)		Rachel Dunn 21/33 (64%); Jo Harten 10/14 (71%); Rachel Shaw 1/3 (33%)	ILT Velodrome; Attendance: 2,500
