= 2024 Australia England netball series =

International netball series

Tournament details
- Host country: Australia
- Dates: 19–22 September 2024
- TV partner(s): Foxtel (Australia); Sky Sports (UK/Ireland); YouTube; NetballPass

Final positions
- Champions: Australia
- Runners-up: England

Tournament statistics
- Matches played: 3
- Top scorer(s): Sophie Garbin; 113/120 (94%)

The 2024 Australia England netball series featured Australia and England playing three netball test matches in September 2024. The Australia team were coached by Stacey Marinkovich and captained by Liz Watson. The England team was coached by Jess Thirlby and captained by Fran Williams. Australia won the series 2–1. Kiera Austin was named player of the series. The series was broadcast live on Sky Sports in the United Kingdom and Ireland, on Foxtel in Australia, YouTube and worldwide on NetballPass.

== Squads ==
=== Australia ===
Australia roster
Players
Coaches

Name	Pos	DOB	Height	Club	Nat	Caps
Sunday Aryang	GD	25 December 2000 (aged 23)	1.82 m (6 ft 0 in)	West Coast Fever
Kiera Austin	GS, GA, WA	26 August 1997 (aged 27)	1.85 m (6 ft 1 in)	Melbourne Vixens
Sophie Dwyer	GA	5 December 2001 (aged 22)	1.83 m (6 ft 0 in)	Giants Netball
Rudi Ellis	GK, GD	13 August 1997 (aged 27)	1.90 m (6 ft 3 in)	Melbourne Vixens
Ash Ervin	GK, GD	15 May 2003 (aged 21)	1.92 m (6 ft 4 in)	Sunshine Coast Lightning
Sophie Garbin	GS, GA	6 April 1997 (aged 27)	1.84 m (6 ft 0 in)	Melbourne Vixens
Matilda Garrett	GK, GD	11 August 1998 (aged 26)	1.85 m (6 ft 1 in)	Adelaide Thunderbirds
Paige Hadley	C, WA, WD	26 August 1992 (aged 32)	1.73 m (5 ft 8 in)	New South Wales Swifts
Georgie Horjus	GA, WA	28 January 2002 (aged 22)	1.72 m (5 ft 8 in)	Adelaide Thunderbirds
Sarah Klau	GK, GD	30 September 1994 (aged 29)	1.90 m (6 ft 3 in)	New South Wales Swifts
Cara Koenen	GS, GA	27 February 1996 (aged 28)	1.90 m (6 ft 3 in)	Sunshine Coast Lightning
Kate Moloney	WD, C, WA	8 January 1993 (aged 31)	1.77 m (5 ft 10 in)	Melbourne Vixens
Jamie-Lee Price	WD, C	10 January 1996 (aged 28)	1.79 m (5 ft 10 in)	Giants Netball
Amy Parmenter	WD, C	1 August 1997 (aged 27)	1.76 m (5 ft 9 in)	Melbourne Mavericks
Liz Watson (c)	WA, C	30 March 1994 (aged 30)	1.78 m (5 ft 10 in)	Sunshine Coast Lightning

Head coach

- Stacey Marinkovich

Notes

- (c) – Captain
- (cc) – Co-captain
- (vc) – Vice-captain
- – Injury / maternity leave
- (TRP) – Temporary Replacement Player

Debuts

- Rudi Ellis made her senior debut for Australia in the first test.

=== England ===
England roster
Players
Coaches

Name	Pos	DOB	Height	Club	Nat	Caps
Imogen Allison	WD, C, WA	24 April 1998 (aged 26)	1.80 m (5 ft 11 in)	Queensland Firebirds	(Australia)
Eleanor Cardwell	GS, GA	11 November 1994 (aged 29)	1.86 m (6 ft 1 in)	Melbourne Mavericks	(Australia)
Amy Carter	C, WD	28 October 1998 (aged 25)	1.76 m (5 ft 9 in)	Manchester Thunder	(England)
Beth Cobden	WD, C	3 February 1993 (aged 31)	1.78 m (5 ft 10 in)	Loughborough Lightning	(England)
Funmi Fadoju	GD, GK, WD	15 August 2002 (aged 22)	1.76 m (5 ft 9 in)	London Pulse	(England)
Alice Harvey	GK, GD	3 April 2001 (aged 23)	1.90 m (6 ft 3 in)	Loughborough Lightning	(England)
Helen Housby	GA, GS	19 January 1995 (aged 29)	1.83 m (6 ft 0 in)	New South Wales Swifts	(Australia)
Hannah Joseph	WA, C	8 February 1994 (aged 30)	1.67 m (5 ft 6 in)	Loughborough Lightning	(England)
Natalie Metcalf	WA, GA	9 December 1992 (aged 31)	1.74 m (5 ft 9 in)	Manchester Thunder	(England)
Berri Neil	GA, GS	12 February 2003 (aged 21)	1.82 m (6 ft 0 in)	Loughborough Lightning	(England)
Lois Pearson	GA, WA	20 September 1999 (aged 24)	1.76 m (5 ft 9 in)	Manchester Thunder	(England)
Razia Quashie	GK, GD	16 September 1997 (aged 27)	1.85 m (6 ft 1 in)	London Mavericks	(England)
Ellie Rattu	C, WD	4 April 2000 (aged 24)	1.77 m (5 ft 10 in)	London Mavericks	(England)
Jess Shaw	C, WA	17 May 1996 (aged 28)	1.70 m (5 ft 7 in)	Birmingham Panthers	(England)
Olivia Tchine	GS	22 November 2000 (aged 23)	1.91 m (6 ft 3 in)	London Pulse	(England)
Fran Williams (c)	GD, GK, WD	23 December 1997 (aged 26)	1.85 m (6 ft 1 in)	West Coast Fever	(Australia)

Head coach

- Jess Thirlby

Notes

- (c) – Captain
- (cc) – Co-captain
- (vc) – Vice-captain
- – Injury / maternity leave
- (TRP) – Temporary Replacement Player

Debuts

- Lois Pearson made her senior debut for England in the first test.
- Jess Shaw made her senior debut for England in the third test.

== Match officials ==
=== Umpires ===
Umpire	Association
Angela Armstrong-Lush	New Zealand
Gareth Fowler	New Zealand
Ken Metekingi	New Zealand

=== Umpire Appointments Panel ===
Umpire	Association
Michelle Phippard	Australia

== Matches ==
=== First test ===
19 September 2024; 19:00 AEST	Australia	70–57	England	Adelaide Entertainment Centre; Attendance: 9,102
19 September 2024; 19:00 AEST	Scoring by quarter: 17–12, 37–26, 52–44, 70–57			Adelaide Entertainment Centre; Attendance: 9,102
19 September 2024; 19:00 AEST	Sophie Garbin 46/48 (96%); Kiera Austin 24/26 (92%)		Helen Housby 26/26 (100%); Olivia Tchine 20/20 (100%); Eleanor Cardwell 7/7 (100%); Lois Pearson 4/5 (80%)	Adelaide Entertainment Centre; Attendance: 9,102

=== Second test ===
22 September 2024; 16:00 AEST	Australia	59–61	England	Qudos Bank Arena
22 September 2024; 16:00 AEST	Scoring by quarter: 13–13, 29–27, 45–43, 59–61			Qudos Bank Arena
22 September 2024; 16:00 AEST	Sophie Garbin 24/25 (96%); Kiera Austin 19/22 (86%); Cara Koenen 16/19 (84%)		Olivia Tchine 32/34 (94%); Helen Housby 29/33 (88%)	Qudos Bank Arena

=== Third test ===
25 September 2024; 19:00 AEST	Australia	69–56	England	Bendigo Stadium; Attendance: 4,032
25 September 2024; 19:00 AEST	Scoring by quarter: 16–13, 30–24, 50–42, 69–56			Bendigo Stadium; Attendance: 4,032
25 September 2024; 19:00 AEST	Sophie Garbin 43/47 (91%); Kiera Austin 24/29 (83%); Sophie Dwyer 2/2 (100%)		Olivia Tchine 39/40 (98%); Helen Housby 15/17 (88%); Berri Neil 2/2 (100%)	Bendigo Stadium; Attendance: 4,032
