= 2023 Taini Jamison Trophy Series =

International netball series

Tournament details
- Host country: New Zealand
- Dates: 24–30 September 2023
- Teams: 2
- TV partner(s): Sky Sport (New Zealand); Sky Sports (UK/Ireland); SportsMax

Final positions
- Champions: New Zealand (11th title)
- Runners-up: England

Tournament statistics
- Matches played: 3
- Top scorer(s): Ameliaranne Ekenasio; 79/87 (91%)

The 2023 Taini Jamison Trophy Series, also known as the 2023 Cadbury Netball Series, was the 14th Taini Jamison Trophy series. It featured New Zealand playing England in three netball test matches, played in September 2023. The New Zealand team were coached by Noeline Taurua and captained by Ameliaranne Ekenasio. England were coached by Liana Leota and co-captained by Sophie Drakeford-Lewis and Halimat Adio. Before the series started, England faced criticism from Netball New Zealand and Taurua for selecting an understrength "B team". However they subsequently defeated New Zealand 55–54 in the opening test. New Zealand eventually won the series 2–1. The series was broadcast live on Sky Sport in New Zealand, on Sky Sports in the United Kingdom and Ireland, on SportsMax in the Caribbean and on YouTube.

== Squads ==
=== New Zealand ===
New Zealand roster
Players
Coaches

Name	Pos	DOB	Height	Club	Nat	Caps
Karin Burger	WD, GD, GK	12 April 1993 (aged 30)	1.84 m (6 ft 0 in)	Mainland Tactix
Ameliaranne Ekenasio (c)	GA, GS	11 January 1991 (aged 32)	1.86 m (6 ft 1 in)	Waikato Bay of Plenty Magic		63
Maddy Gordon	C, WA, WD	16 January 2000 (aged 23)	1.74 m (5 ft 9 in)	Central Pulse
Kate Heffernan	WD, C, WA	7 October 1999 (aged 23)	1.81 m (5 ft 11 in)	Southern Steel
Kelly Jury	GK, GD	22 October 1996 (aged 26)	1.92 m (6 ft 4 in)	Central Pulse
Phoenix Karaka (vc)	GK, GD	6 November 1993 (aged 29)	1.86 m (6 ft 1 in)	Northern Mystics		58
Tiana Metuarau	GA, WA, GS	15 January 2001 (aged 22)	1.83 m (6 ft 0 in)	Central Pulse
Mila Reuelu-Buchanan	WA, C	11 May 1998 (aged 25)	1.72 m (5 ft 8 in)	Northern Stars
Whitney Souness	C, WA	12 November 1995 (aged 27)	1.74 m (5 ft 9 in)	Central Pulse
Jane Watson	GK, GD	7 March 1990 (aged 33)	1.81 m (5 ft 11 in)	Mainland Tactix
Amelia Walmsley	GS, GA	31 January 2004 (aged 19)	1.92 m (6 ft 4 in)	Central Pulse
Maia Wilson	GS, GA	21 September 1997 (aged 26)	1.87 m (6 ft 2 in)	Northern Stars

Head coach

- Noeline Taurua

Notes

- (c) – Captain
- (cc) – Co-captain
- (vc) – Vice-captain
- – Injury / maternity leave
- (TRP) – Temporary Replacement Player

Debuts

- Amelia Walmsley made her senior debut for New Zealand in the second test, scoring 36 from 41 with an 88% accurancy.

=== England ===
England roster
Players
Coaches

Name	Pos	DOB	Height	Club	Nat	Caps
Halimat Adio (cc)	GD, GK, WD	27 January 1998 (aged 25)	1.83 m (6 ft 0 in)	London Pulse
Ella Bowen	GD, GK, WD	1 January 2002 (aged 21)	1.82 m (6 ft 0 in)	Manchester Thunder
Amy Carter (vc)	C, WD	28 October 1998 (aged 24)	1.76 m (5 ft 9 in)	Manchester Thunder
Sophie Drakeford-Lewis (cc)	GA, GS	10 December 1998 (aged 24)	1.79 m (5 ft 10 in)	Surrey Storm
Sasha Glasgow	GS, GA	19 July 1998 (aged 25)	1.87 m (6 ft 2 in)	West Coast Fever
Alice Harvey	GK, GD	3 April 2001 (aged 22)	1.90 m (6 ft 3 in)	Loughborough Lightning
Hannah Joseph	WA, C	8 February 1994 (aged 29)	1.67 m (5 ft 6 in)	Loughborough Lightning
Elle McDonald	C, WA, WD	16 September 1994 (aged 29)	1.75 m (5 ft 9 in)	Leeds Rhinos
Berri Neil	GA, GS	12 February 2003 (aged 20)	1.82 m (6 ft 0 in)	London Pulse
Vicki Oyesola	GD, WD	16 January 1998 (aged 25)	1.80 m (5 ft 11 in)	Leeds Rhinos
Jayda Pechova	GD, GK	21 August 2004 (aged 19)	1.82 m (6 ft 0 in)	Team Bath
Ellie Rattu	C, WD	4 April 2000 (aged 23)	1.77 m (5 ft 10 in)	Saracens Mavericks
Alicia Scholes	WA, C	8 May 2001 (aged 22)	1.63 m (5 ft 4 in)	London Pulse
Emma Thacker	GA, GS	22 August 2003 (aged 20)	1.90 m (6 ft 3 in)	Saracens Mavericks

Head coach

- Liana Leota

Assistant coach

- Sam Bird
  Jo Harten

Notes

- (c) – Captain
- (cc) – Co-captain
- (vc) – Vice-captain
- – Injury / maternity leave
- (TRP) – Temporary Replacement Player

Debuts

- Halimat Adio, Sasha Glasgow, Berri Neil and Alicia Scholes all made their senior debuts for England in the first test. Adio also captained the team on her senior debut.
- Jayda Pechova made their senior debut for England in the second test.

== Match officials ==
Umpires

Umpire	Association
Bronwen Adams	Australia
Joshua Bowring	Australia
Kate Wright	Australia

Umpire Appointments Panel

Umpire	Association
Kirsten Lloyd	New Zealand
Janis Teesdale	New Zealand

== Matches ==
=== First Test ===
24 September 2023	Stats	New Zealand	54–55	England	Wolfbrook Arena
24 September 2023	Stats	Scoring by quarter: 13–12, 23–29, 37–43, 54–55			Wolfbrook Arena
24 September 2023	Stats	Ameliaranne Ekenasio 39/41 (95%); Maia Wilson 9/11 (82%); Tiana Metuarau 6/7 (86%)		Sasha Glasgow 38/41 (93%); Sophie Drakeford-Lewis 15/19 (79%); Berri Neil 2/3 (67%)	Wolfbrook Arena

=== Second Test ===
27 September 2023	Stats	New Zealand	57–36	England	Te Rauparaha Arena
27 September 2023	Stats	Scoring by quarter: 17–7, 27–23, 39–30, 57–36			Te Rauparaha Arena
27 September 2023	Stats	Amelia Walmsley 36/41 (88%); Ameliaranne Ekenasio 21/23 (91%)		Berri Neil 18/24 (75%); Sasha Glasgow 11/15 (73%); Sophie Drakeford-Lewis 7/14 (50%)	Te Rauparaha Arena

=== Third Test ===
30 September 2023	Stats	New Zealand	59–52	England	Globox Arena
30 September 2023	Stats	Scoring by quarter: 12–14, 27–24, 41–39, 59–52			Globox Arena
30 September 2023	Stats	Amelia Walmsley 40/44 (91%); Ameliaranne Ekenasio 19/23 (83%)		Berri Neil 26/32 (81%); Sasha Glasgow 26/29 (90%)	Globox Arena
