= 2014 Taini Jamison Trophy Series =

International netball series

Tournament details
- Host country: New Zealand
- Dates: 28–31 October 2014
- TV partner: Sky Sport (New Zealand)

Final positions
- Champions: New Zealand (5th title)
- Runners-up: England

Tournament statistics
- Matches played: 2

The 2014 Taini Jamison Trophy Series, also referred to as the New World Series, was the sixth Taini Jamison Trophy series. It featured New Zealand playing England in two netball test matches, played in October 2014. England won the opening test 42–38 while New Zealand won the second test 52–38 to level the series 1–1. New Zealand were declared series winners based on aggregate score. The New Zealand team were coached by Waimarama Taumaunu and captained by Laura Langman. England were coached by Anna Mayes and captained by Jade Clarke.

== Squads ==
=== New Zealand ===
New Zealand roster
Players
Coaches

Name	Pos	DOB	Height	Club	Nat	Caps
Jodi Brown	GA, GS	6 May 1981 (aged 33)	1.85 m (6 ft 1 in)	Southern Steel
Kayla Cullen	GD, WD, C	13 February 1992 (aged 22)	1.83 m (6 ft 0 in)	Northern Mystics
Leana de Bruin	GD, GK	9 July 1977 (aged 37)	1.90 m (6 ft 3 in)	Waikato Bay of Plenty Magic
Temalisi Fakahokotau	GD, WD, GK	9 September 1994 (aged 20)	1.82 m (6 ft 0 in)	Northern Mystics
Katrina Grant (vc)	GK, GD, WD	6 May 1987 (aged 27)	1.87 m (6 ft 2 in)	Central Pulse
Joline Henry	GD, WD	29 September 1982 (aged 32)	1.83 m (6 ft 0 in)	Central Pulse
Laura Langman (c)	C, WD	16 April 1986 (aged 28)	1.73 m (5 ft 8 in)	Northern Mystics
Cathrine Latu	GS, GA	25 October 1986 (aged 28)	1.89 m (6 ft 2 in)	Northern Mystics
Liana Leota	C, WA	31 October 1984 (aged 29)	1.68 m (5 ft 6 in)	Central Pulse
Bailey Mes	GS, GA	27 May 1989 (aged 25)	1.87 m (6 ft 2 in)	Northern Mystics
Grace Rasmussen	GA, WA	18 March 1988 (aged 26)	1.77 m (5 ft 10 in)	Waikato Bay of Plenty Magic
Ameliaranne Wells	GS, GA	11 January 1991 (aged 23)	1.86 m (6 ft 1 in)	Central Pulse

Head coach

- Waimarama Taumaunu

Assistant coach

- Vicki Wilson

Manager:
Esther Molloy
Physiotherapist:
Sharon Kearney
Performance Analyst:
Dr Bobby Willcox
Head of Communication and Marketing:
Kerry Manders

Notes

- (c) – Captain
- (cc) – Co-captain
- (vc) – Vice-captain
- – Injury / maternity leave
- (TRP) – Temporary Replacement Player

=== England ===
England roster
Players
Coaches

Name	Pos	DOB	Height	Club	Nat	Caps
Ama Agbeze	GD, GK, WD	31 October 1984 (aged 29)	1.84 m (6 ft 0 in)	Central Pulse		55
Rosie Allison	GS	25 January 1992 (aged 22)	1.90 m (6 ft 3 in)	Team Bath		0
Sara Bayman	C, WA, WD	23 December 1984 (aged 29)	1.81 m (5 ft 11 in)	Manchester Thunder		56
Eboni Beckford-Chambers	GD, GK	4 February 1988 (aged 26)	1.85 m (6 ft 1 in)	West Coast Fever		53
Jade Clarke (c)	WD, C, WA	17 October 1983 (aged 31)	1.74 m (5 ft 9 in)	Mainland Tactix		105
Sam Cook	GK, GD	21 March 1992 (aged 22)	1.81 m (5 ft 11 in)	Team Bath		0
Kadeen Corbin	GS, GA	27 November 1991 (aged 22)	1.77 m (5 ft 10 in)	Hertfordshire Mavericks		21
Rachel Dunn	GS, GA	14 November 1982 (aged 31)	1.87 m (6 ft 2 in)	Surrey Storm		58
Stacey Francis	GD, WD, GK	1 January 1988 (aged 26)	1.80 m (5 ft 11 in)	Team Bath		41
Serena Guthrie	WD, C, WA	5 January 1990 (aged 24)	1.80 m (5 ft 11 in)	Team Bath		48
Jo Harten	GS, GA	21 March 1989 (aged 25)	1.88 m (6 ft 2 in)	Waikato Bay of Plenty Magic		60
Helen Housby	GA, GS, WA	19 January 1995 (aged 19)	1.83 m (6 ft 0 in)	Manchester Thunder		3

Head coach

- Anna Mayes

Assistant coach

- Collette Thompson

Manager:
Sarah Gandon
Physiotherapist:
Ros Cooke
Performance Analyst:
Andrew Butterworth
Performance Psychologist:
Danielle Adams
Strength and conditioning: Katie James

Notes

- (c) – Captain
- (cc) – Co-captain
- (vc) – Vice-captain
- – Injury / maternity leave
- (TRP) – Temporary Replacement Player

== Matches ==
=== First test ===
28 October 2014	New Zealand	38–42	England	Energy Events Centre	Sky Sport (New Zealand)
28 October 2014	Scoring by quarter: 9–14, 17–22, 27–34, 38–42			Energy Events Centre	Sky Sport (New Zealand)
28 October 2014	Bailey Mes 25/35 (71%); Ameliaranne Wells 7/13 (54%); Jodi Brown 6/13 (46%)		Jo Harten; Rachel Dunn	Energy Events Centre	Sky Sport (New Zealand)

=== Second test ===
31 October 2014	New Zealand	52–38	England	Arena Manawatu	Sky Sport (New Zealand)
31 October 2014	Scoring by quarter: 14–11, 26–21, 38–32, 52–38			Arena Manawatu	Sky Sport (New Zealand)
31 October 2014	Jodi Brown 24/30 (80%); Cathrine Latu 26/28 (93%) ?? 2		Jo Harten; Rachel Dunn	Arena Manawatu	Sky Sport (New Zealand)
