= Amanda Newton (netball) =

England netball international

Personal information
- Born: 8 April 1977 (age 49) Stratford, London, England
- Height: 1.79 m (5 ft 10 in)
- School: St Angela's Ursuline School

Netball career
- Playing positions: GD, WD, GK
Years	Club team	Apps
198x–1999	Old Plaistovians	
1999	Capital Shakers	
2001	London Tornadoes	
2002	Northern Thunder	
2003	London Tornadoes	
2005–2009	Galleria Mavericks	
2009–201x	→ Hertfordshire Mavericks	
Years	National team	Caps
1996–2008	England	100
Coaching career
- Years: Team
- 201x–2018: London Pulse
Medal record
Representing England
World Netball Championships
Bronze medal – third place	1999 Christchurch	Team
Commonwealth Games
Bronze medal – third place	1998 Kuala Lumpur	Team
- Updated on 10 April 2020

Amanda Newton (born 8 April 1977) is a former England netball international. She was a member of the England teams that won bronze medals at the 1998 Commonwealth Games and at the 1999 World Netball Championships. She captained England at the 2007 World Netball Championships. Between 2001 and 2010 she played in seven senior finals and won four national titles with three different teams – London Tornadoes, Northern Thunder and Mavericks.

== Early life and education ==
Newton is originally from the Forest Gate/Newham area of East London. She attended St Angela's Ursuline School where she first took netball seriously. In her youth Newton played for the Plaistow-based Old Plaistovians Association. She also played for Essex and East of England at county and regional level and represented Newham at the London Youth Games.

== Playing career ==
=== Clubs ===
Capital Shakers

In 1999, Newton played for Capital Shakers in New Zealand's Coco-Cola Cup. Her Shakers team mates included Jodi Te Huna, Noeline Taurua, Debbie Fuller and Olivia Murphy.

Super Cup

During the Super Cup era, Newton played for both London Tornadoes and Northern Thunder. She played in three successive Super Cup finals and on each occasion finished on the winning side. She helped Tornadoes win the Super Cup in 2001 and 2003 and Thunder win it in 2002.

Mavericks

Newton played for Mavericks in the Netball Superleague. She played for Mavericks in four grand finals and was player of the match when they won the 2008 grand final. Her Mavericks team mates included Louisa Brownfield and Karen Atkinson.

	Senior finals	Team	Place	Opponent
1	2001	London Tornadoes	Winners	Birmingham Blaze
2	2002	Northern Thunder	Winners	Birmingham Blaze
3	2003	London Tornadoes	Winners	London Hurricanes
4	2005–06	Galleria Mavericks	Runners up	Team Bath
5	2006–07	Galleria Mavericks	Runners up	Team Bath
6	2007–08	Galleria Mavericks	Winners	Loughborough Lightning
7	2009–10	Hertfordshire Mavericks	Runners up	Team Bath

=== England ===
Between 1996 and 2008 Newton made 100 senior England appearances. She made her senier debut against Jamaica. She was a member of the England teams that won bronze medals at the 1998 Commonwealth Games and at the 1999 World Netball Championships. Newton missed the 2003 and 2004 international seasons with a cruciate ligament injury. In 2006 she was appointed England captain and she subsequently captained the team at the 2007 World Netball Championships.

Tournaments	Place
1998 Commonwealth Games	3rd place, bronze medalist(s)
1999 World Netball Championships	3rd place, bronze medalist(s)
2002 Commonwealth Games	4th
2003 World Netball Championships	4th
2007 World Netball Championships	4th

== Coaching career ==
PE teacher

While still an active player, Newton worked as a netball coach for Chigwell School. She has subsequently worked as a PE teacher/netball coach at Godolphin and Latymer School, Blackheath High School and Jumeirah English Speaking School.

Netball Superleague

Newton has worked as an assistant coach and defensive specialist with both Hertfordshire Mavericks and Loughborough Lightning in the Netball Superleague. She was also head coach of future Netball Superleague franchise, London Pulse as they prepared to join the league.

England

Newton has helped coach England at both senior and youth levels. She was a member of Tracey Neville's coaching staff at the 2015 Netball World Cup, helping the team win a bronze medal. She also coached an England youth team which toured New Zealand in 2017.

== Honours ==
Mavericks

- Netball Superleague
  - Winners: 2007–08: 1
  - Runners up: 2005–06, 2006–07, 2008–09, 2009–10: 4

London Tornadoes

- Super Cup
  - Winners: 2001, 2003: 2

Northern Thunder

- Super Cup
  - Winners: 2002: 1
