= Olivia Murphy =

England netball international

Personal information
- Full name: Olivia Murphy
- Born: 24 April 1977 (age 49)
- Height: 1.74 m (5 ft 9 in)
- University: Loughborough University

Netball career
- Playing positions: C, WA
| Years | Club team | Apps |
| 1999 | Capital Shakers | |
| 2001 | Birmingham Blaze | |
| 2002–2003 | Northern Flames | |
| 2005–2011 | Loughborough Lightning | |
| Years | National team | Caps |
| 1997–2006 | England | 95 |
Coaching career
- Years: Team
- 200x–201x: Loughborough Lightning
Medal record
Representing England
World Netball Championships
| Bronze medal – third place | 1999 Christchurch | Team |
Commonwealth Games
| Bronze medal – third place | 1998 Kuala Lumpur | Team |
| Bronze medal – third place | 2006 Melbourne | Team |
World Youth Netball Championships
| Bronze medal – third place | 1996 Toronto | Team |

Olivia Murphy (born 24 April 1977) is a former England netball international. Between 1997 and 2006 she made 95 senior appearances for England. She represented England at the 1998 Commonwealth Games and 1999 World Netball Championships. She captained the team at the 2002 and 2006 Commonwealth Games and at the 2003 World Netball Championships. Since 2005, Murphy has represented Loughborough Lightning as team captain, player coach, head coach, director of netball and assistant coach.

== Early life, family and education ==
Murphy is the daughter of Kevin and Liz Murphy. Her father was a teacher. She has a brother, Emlyn. She grew up in Stretton, Derbyshire, near Burton upon Trent. Murphy attended Loughborough University. In 1998 she graduated with a degree in economics and accountancy.

== Playing career ==
=== Capital Shakers ===
In 1999, Murphy played for Capital Shakers in New Zealand's Coco-Cola Cup. Her Shakers teammates included Jodi Te Huna, Noeline Taurua, Debbie Fuller and Amanda Newton.

=== Super Cup ===
During the Super Cup era, Murphy played for Birmingham Blaze and Northern Flames. In 2001, while playing for Blaze she named Player of the Series.

=== Loughborough Lightning ===
Between 2005 and 2011, Murphy played for Loughborough Lightning in the Netball Superleague. She was a member of the Lightning team that played in the 2008 grand final. She has represented Lightning as team captain, player coach, head coach, director of netball and assistant coach. In 2014 she joined Team Bath an assistant coach. However she returned to Lightning for 2015.

=== England ===
Between 1997 and 2006, Murphy made 95 senior appearances for England. She had previously represented England at under-18 and under-21 levels. In 1996 she was a member of England team that were bronze medalists at the 1996 World Youth Netball Championships. Her teammates included Tracey Neville and Amanda Newton. In 1997, she made her senior debut against Northern Ireland. She represented England at the 1998 Commonwealth Games and 1999 World Netball Championships. She captained the team at the 2002 and 2006 Commonwealth Games and at the 2003 World Netball Championships. She also captained England during series' against Australia, Jamaica, New Zealand and South Africa. In 2018 she was inducted into England Netball's Hall of Fame.

| Tournaments | Place |
|---|---|
| 1996 World Youth Netball Championships | 3rd place, bronze medalist(s) |
| 1998 Commonwealth Games | 3rd place, bronze medalist(s) |
| 1999 World Netball Championships | 3rd place, bronze medalist(s) |
| 2002 Commonwealth Games | 4th |
| 2003 World Netball Championships | 4th |
| 2006 Commonwealth Games | 3rd place, bronze medalist(s) |

== Coach ==
=== Loughborough University ===
As well as coaching with Loughborough Lightning, Murphy has worked for Loughborough University in various coaching roles. She has served as Head Netball Coach, Head of Performance Support and deputy director of Sport.

=== England ===
Since 2014, Murphy worked as a coach with England under-17 teams. Between May 2021 and June 2023, she was a member of Jess Thirlby's England coaching staff, working with Sonia Mkoloma and Liana Leota.
