= 2017 Taini Jamison Trophy Series =

International netball series

Tournament details
- Host country: New Zealand
- Dates: 7–13 September 2017
- Teams: 2
- TV partner(s): Sky Sport (New Zealand); Sky Sports (UK/Ireland)

Final positions
- Champions: New Zealand (8th title)
- Runners-up: England

Tournament statistics
- Matches played: 3
- Top scorer(s): Jo Harten 92/109 (84%)

The 2017 Taini Jamison Trophy Series was the ninth Taini Jamison Trophy series. It featured New Zealand playing England in three netball test matches, played in September 2017. New Zealand won the opening test 62–55. England won the second test 46–49 to level the series 1–1. However, New Zealand subsequently won the third test 62–55 and the series 2–1. The New Zealand team were coached by Janine Southby and captained by Katrina Grant. England were coached by Tracey Neville and captained by Ama Agbeze. The series was broadcast live on Radio Sport and Sky Sport in New Zealand and on Sky Sports in the United Kingdom and Ireland.

== Squads ==
=== New Zealand ===
New Zealand roster
Players
Coaches

Name	Pos	DOB	Height	Club	Nat	Caps
Gina Crampton	WA, C	7 December 1991 (aged 25)	1.74 m (5 ft 9 in)	Southern Steel
Kayla Cullen	GD, WD, C	13 February 1992 (aged 25)	1.83 m (6 ft 0 in)	Northern Stars
Monica Falkner	GA, GS	8 April 1991 (aged 26)	1.81 m (5 ft 11 in)	Waikato Bay of Plenty Magic
Temalisi Fakahokotau	GD, WD, GK	9 September 1994 (aged 22)	1.82 m (6 ft 0 in)	Mainland Tactix
Shannon Francois	WA, C, GA	12 October 1990 (aged 26)	1.76 m (5 ft 9 in)	Southern Steel
Katrina Grant (c)	GK, GD, WD	6 May 1987 (aged 30)	1.87 m (6 ft 2 in)	Central Pulse
Kelly Jury	GK, GD	22 October 1996 (aged 20)	1.92 m (6 ft 4 in)	Waikato Bay of Plenty Magic
Claire Kersten	WD, C	9 July 1989 (aged 28)	1.75 m (5 ft 9 in)	Central Pulse
Bailey Mes	GS, GA	27 May 1989 (aged 28)	1.87 m (6 ft 2 in)	Northern Mystics
Grace Rasmussen	GA, WA	18 March 1988 (aged 29)	1.77 m (5 ft 10 in)	Northern Stars
Te Paea Selby-Rickit	GS, GA	14 January 1992 (aged 25)	1.93 m (6 ft 4 in)	Southern Steel
Maria Tutaia (vc)	GA, GS	18 February 1987 (aged 30)	1.88 m (6 ft 2 in)	Northern Mystics
Jane Watson	GK, GD, WD	7 March 1990 (aged 27)	1.81 m (5 ft 11 in)	Southern Steel

Head coach

- Janine Southby

Assistant coach

- Yvette McCausland-Durie

Notes

- (c) – Captain
- (cc) – Co-captain
- (vc) – Vice-captain
- – Injury / maternity leave
- (TRP) – Temporary Replacement Player

Debuts

- Claire Kersten made her senior debut for New Zealand in the second test.

Milestones

- Katrina Grant made her 100th senior appearance for New Zealand in the third test.

=== England ===
England roster
Players
Coaches

Name	Pos	DOB	Height	Club	Nat	Caps
Ama Agbeze (c)	GD, GK, WD	31 October 1984 (aged 32)	1.84 m (6 ft 0 in)	Adelaide Thunderbirds
Sara Bayman	C, WA, WD	23 December 1984 (aged 32)	1.81 m (5 ft 11 in)	Central Pulse
Eboni Beckford-Chambers	GD, GK	4 February 1988 (aged 29)	1.85 m (6 ft 1 in)	Team Bath
Eleanor Cardwell	GS, GA	11 November 1994 (aged 22)	1.86 m (6 ft 1 in)	Severn Stars
Jade Clarke (vc)	WD, C, WA	17 October 1983 (aged 33)	1.74 m (5 ft 9 in)	Adelaide Thunderbirds
Beth Cobden	WD, C	3 February 1993 (aged 24)	1.78 m (5 ft 10 in)	Loughborough Lightning
Kadeen Corbin	GS, GA	27 November 1991 (aged 25)	1.77 m (5 ft 10 in)	Mainland Tactix
Stacey Francis	GD, WD, GK	1 January 1988 (aged 29)	1.80 m (5 ft 11 in)	West Coast Fever
Jodie Gibson	GD, WD, GK	30 October 1992 (aged 24)	1.78 m (5 ft 10 in)
Serena Guthrie	WD, C, WA	5 January 1990 (aged 27)	1.80 m (5 ft 11 in)	Giants Netball
Jo Harten (vc)	GS, GA	21 March 1989 (aged 28)	1.88 m (6 ft 2 in)	Giants Netball
Helen Housby	GA, GS, WA	19 January 1995 (aged 22)	1.83 m (6 ft 0 in)	New South Wales Swifts
Geva Mentor	GK, GD, WD	17 September 1984 (aged 32)	1.91 m (6 ft 3 in)	Sunshine Coast Lightning
Chelsea Pitman	GA, WA	8 June 1988 (aged 29)	1.81 m (5 ft 11 in)	Adelaide Thunderbirds

Head coach

- Tracey Neville

Assistant coach

- Tania Obst
  Performance Coach
  Collette Thompson

Notes

- (c) – Captain
- (cc) – Co-captain
- (vc) – Vice-captain
- – Injury / maternity leave
- (TRP) – Temporary Replacement Player

== Matches ==
=== First test ===
7 September 2017; 7.45pm (NZT)	New Zealand	62–55	England	Te Rauparaha Arena
7 September 2017; 7.45pm (NZT)	Scoring by quarter: 15–15, 29–28, 42–40, 62–55			Te Rauparaha Arena
7 September 2017; 7.45pm (NZT)	Maria Tutaia 31/37 (84%); Te Paea Selby-Rickit 20/24 (83%); Bailey Mes 11/14 (79%)		Jo Harten 31/37 (84%); Helen Housby 24/33 (73%)	Te Rauparaha Arena

=== Second test ===
10 September 2017	New Zealand	46–49	England	Pettigrew Green Arena
10 September 2017	Scoring by quarter: 12–13, 24–27, 37–38, 46–49			Pettigrew Green Arena
10 September 2017	Bailey Mes 26/30 (87%); Te Paea Selby-Rickit 12/15 (80%); Maria Tutaia 8/16 (50%)		Jo Harten 25/32 (78%); Helen Housby 24/32 (75%)	Pettigrew Green Arena

=== Third test ===
13 September 2017	New Zealand	62–55	England	Claudelands Arena
13 September 2017	Scoring by quarter: 17–13, 26–30, 44–43, 62–55			Claudelands Arena
13 September 2017	Maria Tutaia 41/52 (79%); Bailey Mes 21/21 (100%)		Jo Harten 36/40 (90%); Helen Housby 19/25 (76%)	Claudelands Arena
