= 2024 Taini Jamison Trophy Series =

International netball series

Tournament details
- Host country: New Zealand
- Dates: 29 September–6 October 2024
- Teams: 2
- TV partner(s): Sky Sport (New Zealand); Sky Sports (UK/Ireland); YouTube; NetballPass

Final positions
- Champions: England (2nd title)
- Runners-up: New Zealand

Tournament statistics
- Matches played: 3
- Top scorer(s): Grace Nweke; 140/158 (89%)

The 2024 Taini Jamison Trophy Series, also known as the 2024 Cadbury Netball Series, was the 15th Taini Jamison Trophy series. It featured New Zealand playing England in three netball test matches, played in September and October 2024. After winning the two opening tests, England eventually won the series 2–1. The winning England team was coached by Jess Thirlby and captained by Fran Williams. The New Zealand team were coached by Noeline Taurua and captained by Ameliaranne Ekenasio. The series was broadcast live on Sky Sport in New Zealand, on Sky Sports in the United Kingdom and Ireland and worldwide on NetballPass and YouTube.

== Squads ==
=== New Zealand ===
New Zealand roster
Players
Coaches

| Name | Pos | DOB | Height | Club | Nat | Caps |
|---|---|---|---|---|---|---|
| Karin Burger | WD, GD, GK | 12 April 1993 (aged 31) | 1.84 m (6 ft 0 in) | Mainland Tactix | (New Zealand) |
| Ameliaranne Ekenasio (c) | GA, GS | 11 January 1991 (aged 33) | 1.86 m (6 ft 1 in) | Waikato Bay of Plenty Magic | (New Zealand) |
| Maddy Gordon | C, WA, WD | 16 January 2000 (aged 24) | 1.74 m (5 ft 9 in) | Central Pulse | (New Zealand) |
| Kate Heffernan | WD, C, WA | 7 October 1999 (aged 24) | 1.81 m (5 ft 11 in) | Southern Steel | (New Zealand) |
| Kelly Jackson | GK, GD | 22 October 1996 (aged 27) | 1.92 m (6 ft 4 in) | Central Pulse | (New Zealand) |
| Phoenix Karaka | GK, GD | 6 November 1993 (aged 30) | 1.86 m (6 ft 1 in) | Northern Mystics | (New Zealand) |
| Paris Mason | GK, GD, WD | 13 December 2002 (aged 21) | 1.84 m (6 ft 0 in) | Central Pulse | (New Zealand) |
| Erena Mikaere | GD, GK | 9 July 1988 (aged 36) | 1.93 m (6 ft 4 in) | Waikato Bay of Plenty Magic | (New Zealand) |
| Grace Nweke | GS | 7 February 2002 (aged 22) | 1.93 m (6 ft 4 in) | New South Wales Swifts | (Australia) |
| Claire O'Brien | WA, C | 11 March 1997 (aged 27) | 1.73 m (5 ft 8 in) | Waikato Bay of Plenty Magic | (New Zealand) |
| Kimiora Poi | C, WA | 1 November 1997 (aged 26) | 1.68 m (5 ft 6 in) | Southern Steel | (New Zealand) |
| Whitney Souness | C, WA | 12 November 1995 (aged 28) | 1.74 m (5 ft 9 in) | Central Pulse | (New Zealand) |
| Amelia Walmsley | GS, GA | 31 January 2004 (aged 20) | 1.92 m (6 ft 4 in) | Central Pulse | (New Zealand) |
| Maia Wilson | GS, GA | 21 September 1997 (aged 27) | 1.87 m (6 ft 2 in) | Northern Stars | (New Zealand) |

Head coach

- Noeline Taurua

Notes

- (c) – Captain
- (cc) – Co-captain
- (vc) – Vice-captain
- – Injury / maternity leave
- (TRP) – Temporary Replacement Player

Debuts

- Claire O'Brien and Paris Mason both made their senior debuts for New Zealand in the first test.

Milestones

- Maia Wilson made her 50th senior appearance for New Zealand in the second test.

=== England ===
England roster
Players
Coaches

| Name | Pos | DOB | Height | Club | Nat | Caps |
|---|---|---|---|---|---|---|
| Imogen Allison | WD, C, WA | 24 April 1998 (aged 26) | 1.80 m (5 ft 11 in) | Queensland Firebirds | (Australia) |
| Amy Carter | C, WD | 28 October 1998 (aged 25) | 1.76 m (5 ft 9 in) | Manchester Thunder | (England) |
| Beth Cobden | WD, C | 3 February 1993 (aged 31) | 1.78 m (5 ft 10 in) | Loughborough Lightning | (England) |
| Funmi Fadoju | GD, GK, WD | 15 August 2002 (aged 22) | 1.76 m (5 ft 9 in) | London Pulse | (England) |
| Alice Harvey | GK, GD | 3 April 2001 (aged 23) | 1.90 m (6 ft 3 in) | Loughborough Lightning | (England) |
| Helen Housby | GA, GS | 19 January 1995 (aged 29) | 1.83 m (6 ft 0 in) | New South Wales Swifts | (Australia) |
| Hannah Joseph | WA, C | 8 February 1994 (aged 30) | 1.67 m (5 ft 6 in) | Loughborough Lightning | (England) |
| Natalie Metcalf | WA, GA | 9 December 1992 (aged 31) | 1.74 m (5 ft 9 in) | Manchester Thunder | (England) |
| Berri Neil | GA, GS | 12 February 2003 (aged 21) | 1.82 m (6 ft 0 in) | Loughborough Lightning | (England) |
| Lois Pearson | GA, WA | 20 September 1999 (aged 25) | 1.76 m (5 ft 9 in) | Manchester Thunder | (England) |
| Razia Quashie | GK, GD | 16 September 1997 (aged 27) | 1.85 m (6 ft 1 in) | London Mavericks | (England) |
| Ellie Rattu | C, WD | 4 April 2000 (aged 24) | 1.77 m (5 ft 10 in) | London Mavericks | (England) |
| Olivia Tchine | GS | 22 November 2000 (aged 23) | 1.91 m (6 ft 3 in) | London Pulse | (England) |
| Fran Williams (c) | GD, GK, WD | 23 December 1997 (aged 26) | 1.85 m (6 ft 1 in) | West Coast Fever | (Australia) |

Head coach

- Jess Thirlby

Notes

- (c) – Captain
- (cc) – Co-captain
- (vc) – Vice-captain
- – Injury / maternity leave
- (TRP) – Temporary Replacement Player

== Match officials ==
Umpires

| Umpire | Association |
|---|---|
| Bronwen Adams | Australia |
| Joshua Bowring | Australia |
| Georgina Sulley-Beales | Australia |

Umpire Appointments Panel

| Umpire | Association |
|---|---|
| Colleen Bond | New Zealand |
| Fay Meiklejohn | New Zealand |
| Kirsten Lloyd | New Zealand |

== Matches ==
=== First Test ===
| 29 September 2024; 19:35 NZT | Stats | New Zealand | 58–59 | England | The Trusts Arena |
| 29 September 2024; 19:35 NZT | Stats | Scoring by quarter: 14–15, 29–29, 45–44, 58–59 | | | The Trusts Arena |
| 29 September 2024; 19:35 NZT | Stats | Grace Nweke 49/55 (89%); Ameliaranne Ekenasio 7/8 (88%); Maia Wilson 2/2 (100%) | | Olivia Tchine 41/45 (91%); Helen Housby 18/21 (86%) | The Trusts Arena |

=== Second Test ===
| 2 October 2024; 19:35 NZT | Stats | New Zealand | 55–59 | England | Te Rauparaha Arena |
| 2 October 2024; 19:35 NZT | Stats | Scoring by quarter: 13–16, 27–28, 45–40, 55–59 | | | Te Rauparaha Arena |
| 2 October 2024; 19:35 NZT | Stats | Grace Nweke 43/51 (84%); Ameliaranne Ekenasio 11/13 (85%); Maia Wilson 1/1 (100%) | | Olivia Tchine 41/46 (89%); Helen Housby 14/17 (82%); Berri Neil 4/5 (80%) | Te Rauparaha Arena |

=== Third Test ===
| 6 October 2024; 19:35 NZT | Stats | New Zealand | 61–56 | England | ILT Stadium Southland |
| 6 October 2024; 19:35 NZT | Stats | Scoring by quarter: 18–16, 32–28, 47–46, 61–56 | | | ILT Stadium Southland |
| 6 October 2024; 19:35 NZT | Stats | Grace Nweke 48/52 (92%); Ameliaranne Ekenasio 13/14 (93%) | | Olivia Tchine 34/36 (94%); Helen Housby 18/22 (82%); Lois Pearson 4/7 (57%) | ILT Stadium Southland |
