= Kendra Slawinski =

England netball international

Kendra Slawinski OBE
Personal information
- Full name: Kendra Slawinski (née Lowe)
- Born: 13 December 1962 (age 63)
- Relative: Kenny Lowe (brother)
- University: De Montfort University

Netball career
- Playing positions: GD, GK
Years	National team	Caps
1983–1995	England	128
Coaching career
- Years: Team
- 2001: Birmingham Blaze
- 2008–2009: Galleria Mavericks
Medal record
Representing England
World Games
Bronze medal – third place	1989 Karlsruhe	Team

Kendra Slawinski OBE (born 13 December 1962), originally known as Kendra Lowe, is a former England netball international. Between 1983 and 1995 she made 128 senior appearances for England. She represented England at the 1983 and 1987 World Netball Tournament and at 1985 and 1989 World Games and captained the team at the 1991 and 1995 World Netball Championships and at the 1993 World Games. In 1996, she was awarded an OBE for her services to netball.

== Early life, family and education ==
Slawinski is the daughter of Lili and Kenny Lowe Sr. She was raised in Billingham. Her older brother, Kenny Lowe, is a former England men's semi-pro international footballer and Perth Glory manager. Slawinski attended De Montfort University.

== Playing career ==
=== England ===
Between 1983 and 1995, Slawinski made 128 senior appearances for England. She represented England at the 1983, 1987, 1991 and 1995 World Netball Championships and at the 1985, 1989 and 1993 World Games. She captained England at the 1991 and 1995 World Netball Championships and at the 1993 World Games. In 1993 she received her 100th senior cap. In November 1995, she made her 128th and final appearance for England during a series against the Cook Islands. She was the world's most capped netball international, until 2005 when she overtaken by New Zealand's Irene van Dyk. In 1996, she was awarded an OBE for her services to netball. In 2001 she was an inaugural inductee into England Netball's Hall of Fame.

Tournaments	Place
1983 World Netball Tournament	4th
1985 World Games	4th
1987 World Netball Tournament	4th
1989 World Games	3rd place, bronze medalist(s)
1991 World Netball Championships	4th
1993 World Games	4th
1995 World Netball Championships	4th

== Later career ==
=== Coach ===
During the Super Cup era, Slawinski was head coach of Birmingham Blaze. During the 2007–08 Netball Superleague season, Slawinski served as assistant coach when Galleria Mavericks reached the grand final. During the 2008–09 season she was Mavericks head coach, guiding them to another grand final.

=== Teacher ===
Since 1986, Slawinski has worked as a teacher at Cardinal Newman Catholic School in Luton. On 19 July 2024 after 39 years of outstanding service, she retired from her final position of Assistant Headteacher.
