= St Angela's Ursuline School =

St Angela's Ursuline School and 6th Form
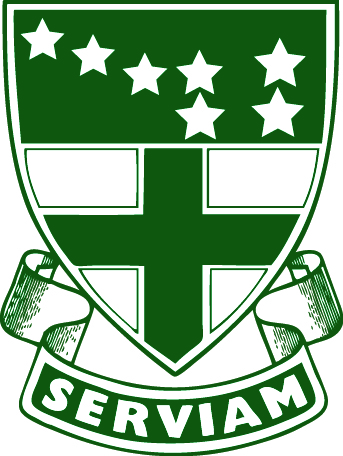
- Motto Badge for St.Angela

Location
- St. George’s Road; Forest Gate, Greater London, E7 8HU; England; 51°32′32″N 0°01′47″E

Information
- Type: Voluntary aided school
- Motto: "Serviam" (Latin for I will serve.)
- Religious affiliation: Roman Catholic
- Established: 1862
- Founders: Ursuline Sisters
- Local authority: Newham
- Department for Education URN: 102786 Tables
- Ofsted: Reports
- Headmaster: Mark Johnson
- Gender: Girls, Mixed (at 6th form)
- Age: 11 to 18
- Enrolment: c. 1350
- Houses: Norman, Plantagenet, Stewart, Tudor
- Colours: years 7-9 years 10-11 Sixth Form
- Website: http://www.stangelas-ursuline.co.uk

St Angela's Ursuline School and Sixth Form is a Catholic secondary school for girls with a mixed gender 6th form centre. It is located in Forest Gate, east London, United Kingdom. It is a voluntary aided school which had 1375 students in 2014.

== History ==
St. Angela's is a Roman Catholic school started in February 1862 by four sisters of the Ursuline order from Belgium.

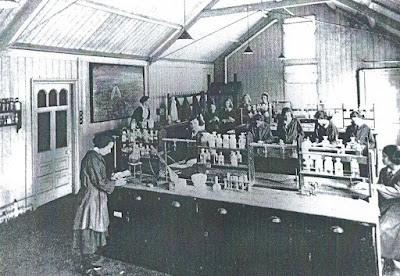
The school's first science lab was in 1907

The nuns bought a semi-detached house and bought the rest the following year. This property is known as "Old House" by the school. The nuns who soon became eight were inspired by the vision of their founder who became the school's namesake. In 1862 the school expanded to other buildings. The school had no uniform until 1877.

The school grew and in 1892 four nuns left this school to found another Ursuline school in Wimbledon.

In 1907 the school's first science lab was created.

== Today ==
St. Angela's is a multi-ethnic, voluntary-aided Language College in the London Borough of Newham. The school population reflects the Catholic population of the borough, which is largely Filipino, Afro-Caribbean, Indian, Sri Lankan, Latino, African and white. 95% of school population are from ethnic minorities. The school had an "outstanding" inspection by Ofsted in 2009.

St Angela's has won national championships in basketball and debating.

== Notable former students ==
- Margaret Tyzack, CBE (1931–2011), actress
- Kele Le Roc (b. 1975), MOBO award-winning singer
- Amanda Newton (b. 1977), netball player
- Vanessa White (b. 1989), member of the girl group "The Saturdays"
- Joelle Mae David (b.1989), TV and film director, notable work includes Queenie, Dreaming Whilst Black and Boarders
