= 2008 Netball Superleague Grand Final =

Netball Superleague grand final

- Event: 2007–08 Netball Superleague season
Galleria Mavericks	Loughborough Lightning
43	39
- Galleria Mavericks make their third successive grand final appearance and win their first Netball Superleague title.
- Date: 5 April 2008
- Venue: K2 Leisure Centre, Crawley
- Player of the Match: Amanda Newton

The 2008 Netball Superleague Grand Final featured Galleria Mavericks and Loughborough Lightning. Having played in both the 2006 and 2007 grand finals, this was Mavericks' third successive grand final appearance. It proved third time lucky for Mavericks who defeated Lightning 43–39.

Lightning were leading 21–14 at half time thanks to an outstanding shooting performance from 19-year-old Joanne Harten. However Mavericks, inspired by Louisa Brownfield and Karen Atkinson, subsequently began to create more shooting opportunities. Mavericks defence – Amanda Newton, Clare Elsley and Naomi Siddall – also played a vital part in a second half fight back. By the end of the third quarter, Mavericks had reduced Lightning's lead to 28–31. During the final quarter Mavericks drew level at 34–34, before pulling ahead by six goals thanks to clinical finishing from Brownfield and Michelle Hall. Harten scored four goals to help keep Lightning in touch before three goals from Brownfield secured the title for Mavericks.

== Match summary ==
5 April 2008	Galleria Mavericks	43–39	Loughborough Lightning	K2 Leisure Centre	Sky Sports
5 April 2008	Scoring by quarter: 6–9, 14–21, 28–31, 43–39			K2 Leisure Centre	Sky Sports
5 April 2008	Louisa Brownfield 33/38 (87%) ? Michelle Hall 9/11 (82%); Monique Wood 2/7 (29%)		Joanne Harten 24/30 (80%); Alex Wood 11/17 (65%); Becky James 4/8 (50%)	K2 Leisure Centre	Sky Sports

== Teams ==
Head Coach: Maggie Jackson; Assistant Coach: Kendra Slawinski Starting 7: GS Louisa Brownfield; GA Monique Wood; WA Karen Atkinson; C Deb Jones; WD Clare Elsley; GD Amanda Newton; GK Naomi Siddall (c) Substitutes: WA Ann Marie Muller; GA Michelle Hall	Head Coach: Rosie Port; Player coach: Olivia Murphy Starting 7: GS Joanne Harten; GA Becky James; WA Natasha Hampshire; C Olivia Murphy; WD Jade Clarke; GD Verona Tomlin; GK Hannah Reid Substitutes: GS Alex Wood; WD Kara Luck
