= Jo Harten =

England netball international (born 1989)

Jo Harten MBE
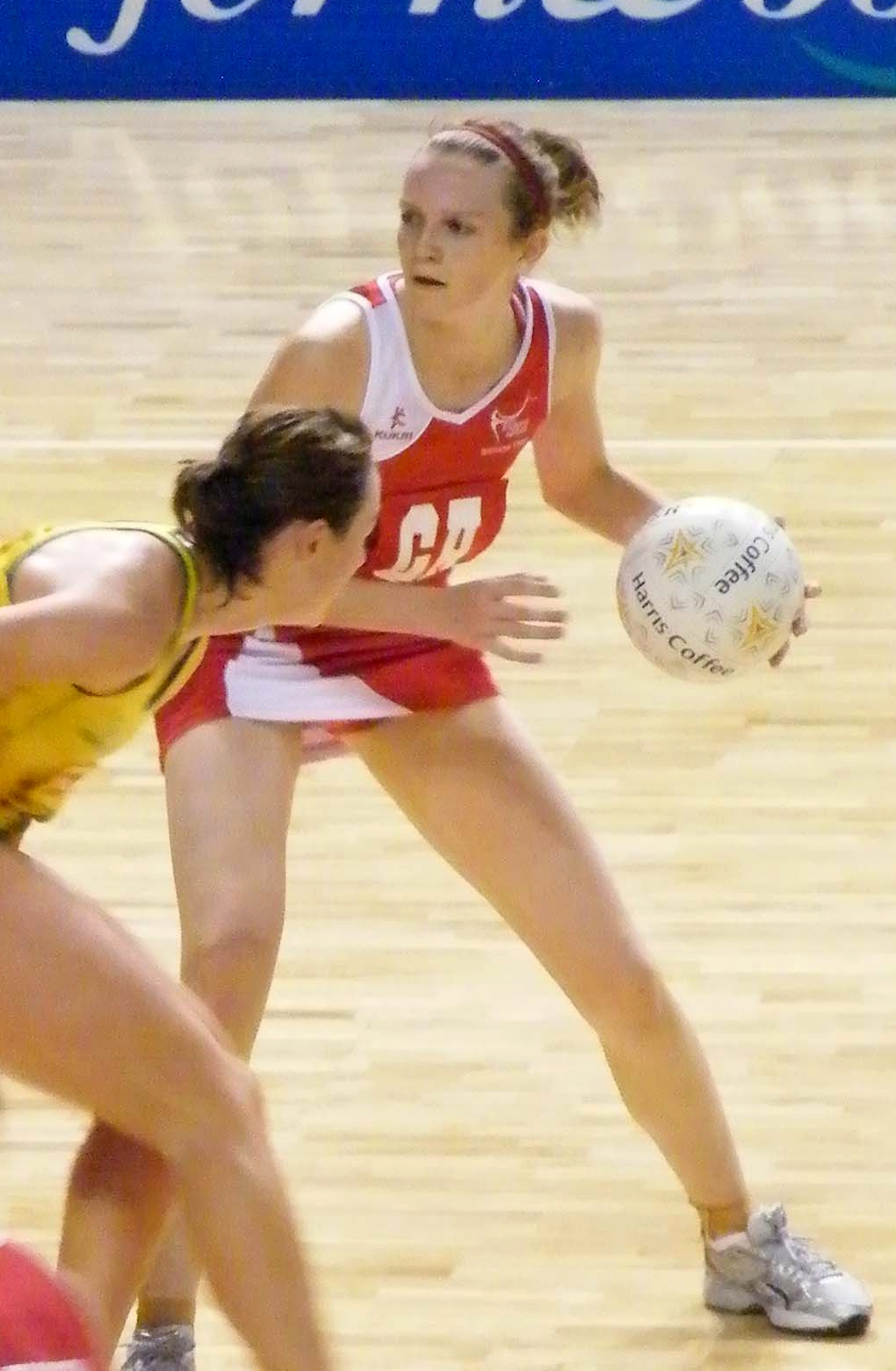
- Harten in 2008

Personal information
- Full name: Joanne Elizabeth Harten
- Born: 21 March 1989 (age 37) Harlow, Essex, England
- Height: 1.88 m (6 ft 2 in)
- University: Loughborough University

Netball career
- Playing positions: GS, GA
Years	Club team	Apps
199x–200x	Harlow Tegate	
2006–2007	Galleria Mavericks	
2007–2011	Loughborough Lightning	
2012–2013	Canterbury Tactix	
2014–2016	Waikato Bay of Plenty Magic	
2017–2025	Giants Netball	96
2019	→ Loughborough Lightning	
Years	National team	Caps
2007–2023	England	117
Coaching career
- Years: Team
- 2023–present: England (Technical Coach)
- 2026–present: New South Wales Swifts (Ass)
Medal record
Representing England
Commonwealth Games
Gold medal – first place	2018 Gold Coast	Team
Bronze medal – third place	2010 Delhi	Team
Netball World Cup
Bronze medal – third place	2011 Singapore	Team
Bronze medal – third place	2015 Sydney	Team
Bronze medal – third place	2019 Liverpool	Team
Fast5 Netball World Series
Gold medal – first place	2011 Liverpool	Team
Gold medal – first place	2017 Melbourne	Team
Silver medal – second place	2010 Liverpool	Team
Silver medal – second place	2012 Auckland	Team
- Updated on 24 April 2023

Joanne Elizabeth Harten MBE (born 21 March 1989) is a former England netball international and the current assistant coach of New South Wales Swifts and Technical Coach for the English Roses. She was a member of the England team that won the gold medal at the 2018 Commonwealth Games. She also sits on the board of the Australian Netball Players’ Association.

In 2020 she received an MBE for her services to netball. She was also a member of the England teams that won bronze medals at the 2010 Commonwealth Games and at the 2011, 2015 and 2019 Netball World Cups.

At club level she has played in grand finals for Galleria Mavericks, Loughborough Lightning and Giants Netball. Harten has captained Loughborough Lightning, Giants and England teams.

== Early life, family and education ==
Harten is originally from Harlow, Essex. She is the daughter of Barry and Chris Harten. Her family home is in Church Langley. In her youth she played various sports including association football, tennis and field hockey. Her mother, who played for a team in a local league, introduced her to netball. Harten subsequently began playing with a local club, Harlow Tegate Netball Club.

Harten graduated from Loughborough University in 2011 with a BA in International Relations. She is currently studying a Graduate Certificate of Business (Sport Management) at Deakin University.

== Club career ==
=== Galleria Mavericks ===
Harten played for Galleria Mavericks during the 2006–07 Netball Superleague season, helping them reach the grand final. In the grand final, Harten scored 15/19 as Mavericks lost 53–45 to Team Bath.

=== Loughborough Lightning ===
Between 2007 and 2011, while attending Loughborough University, Harten played for Loughborough Lightning. In the 2008 Netball Superleague Grand Final, Harten scored 24/30 as Lightning lost 43–39 to her former team, Galleria Mavericks.

In 2009 Harten was appointed Loughborough Lightning captain. In October 2019, Harten guested for Loughborough Lightning in the British Fast5 Netball All-Stars Championship, helping them win the tournament as she scored 58 of their 61 goals as they defeated Wasps 61–35 in the final.

=== Canterbury Tactix ===
During the 2012 and 2013 ANZ Championship seasons Harten played for Canterbury Tactix.

=== Waikato Bay of Plenty Magic ===
Between 2014 and 2016 Harten played for Waikato Bay of Plenty Magic.

=== Giants Netball ===
Since 2017, Harten has played for the Giants Netball franchise in the Suncorp Super Netball. In her debut season with Giants, Harten helped them reach the grand final but finished on the losing side as Sunshine Coast Lightning defeated Giants 65–48. In the final she scored 20/25.

Ahead of the 2020 Suncorp Super Netball season, Harten was appointed captain of the Giants team.

Harten was the victim of cyberbullying via Instagram for a game against the West Coast Fever that was lost due to a held ball in the last few seconds of the game. "Love me or hate me, I compete hard for 60 mins, but no one deserves this," Harten wrote.

At the end of the 24/25 season, Harten announced her retirement from netball.

== International career ==
=== England ===
Harten made her senior debut for England on 11 November 2007 against Barbados during the 2007 World Netball Championships. She was subsequently a member of England teams that won bronze medals at the 2010 Commonwealth Games and at the 2011 and 2015 Netball World Cups.

She was also a member of the England teams that won the gold medals at the 2011 and 2017 Fast5 Netball World Series tournaments. Harten was a prominent member of the England team that won the gold medal at the 2018 Commonwealth Games. In the semi-final against Jamaica, she scored a dramatic last-second winner that saw England reach a Commonwealth Games final for the first time.

Harten captained England at the 2018 Fast5 Netball World Series. She made her 100th senior England appearance against Uganda on 12 July 2019 during the 2019 Netball World Cup. In 2020 she received an MBE for her services to netball.

Harten announced her retirement from international netball on 24 April 2023, stating "I cannot give 100 per cent of myself both physically and mentally at this stage".

Tournaments	Place
2007 World Netball Championships	4th
2009 World Netball Series	4th
2010 Commonwealth Games	3rd place, bronze medalist(s)
2010 World Netball Series	2nd place, silver medalist(s)
2011 World Netball Championships	3rd place, bronze medalist(s)
2011 Taini Jamison Trophy Series	2nd
2011 World Netball Series	1st place, gold medalist(s)
2012 Netball Quad Series	3rd
2012 Fast5 Netball World Series	2nd place, silver medalist(s)
2014 Commonwealth Games	4th
2014 Taini Jamison Trophy Series	2nd
2014 Fast5 Netball World Series	3rd
2015 Netball World Cup	3rd place, bronze medalist(s)
2016 Netball Quad Series	3rd
2016 Fast5 Netball World Series	4th
2017 Netball Quad Series (August/September)	3rd
2017 Taini Jamison Trophy Series	2nd
2017 Fast5 Netball World Series	1st place, gold medalist(s)
2018 Commonwealth Games	1st place, gold medalist(s)
2018 Netball Quad Series (September)	2nd
2018 Fast5 Netball World Series	5th
2019 Netball Quad Series	2nd
2019 Netball World Cup	3rd place, bronze medalist(s)
2022 Commonwealth Games	4th

== Coaching career ==
Harten was appointed as a technical coach for the English national team in 2023 and coached for the South West Mounties Magic in Netball NSW's IMB Bank Premier League. In 2026 she was announced as the assistant coach for the New South Wales Swifts ahead of the 2027 season.

== Personal ==
Harten is a fan of Tottenham Hotspur F.C.

== Honours ==
England

- Commonwealth Games
  - Winners: 2018: 1
- Fast5 Netball World Series
  - Winners: 2011, 2017: 2
  - Runners Up: 2010, 2012: 2
- Netball Quad Series
  - Runners Up: 2018 (Sep), 2019: 2

Giants Netball

- Suncorp Super Netball
  - Runners up: 2017: 1

Loughborough Lightning

- Netball Superleague
  - Runners up: 2007–08: 1
- British Fast5 Netball All-Stars Championship
  - Winners: 2019: 1

Galleria Mavericks

- Netball Superleague
  - Runners up: 2006–07: 1
