= Jessica Shaw (netball) =

English international netball player (born 1996)

Jess Shaw
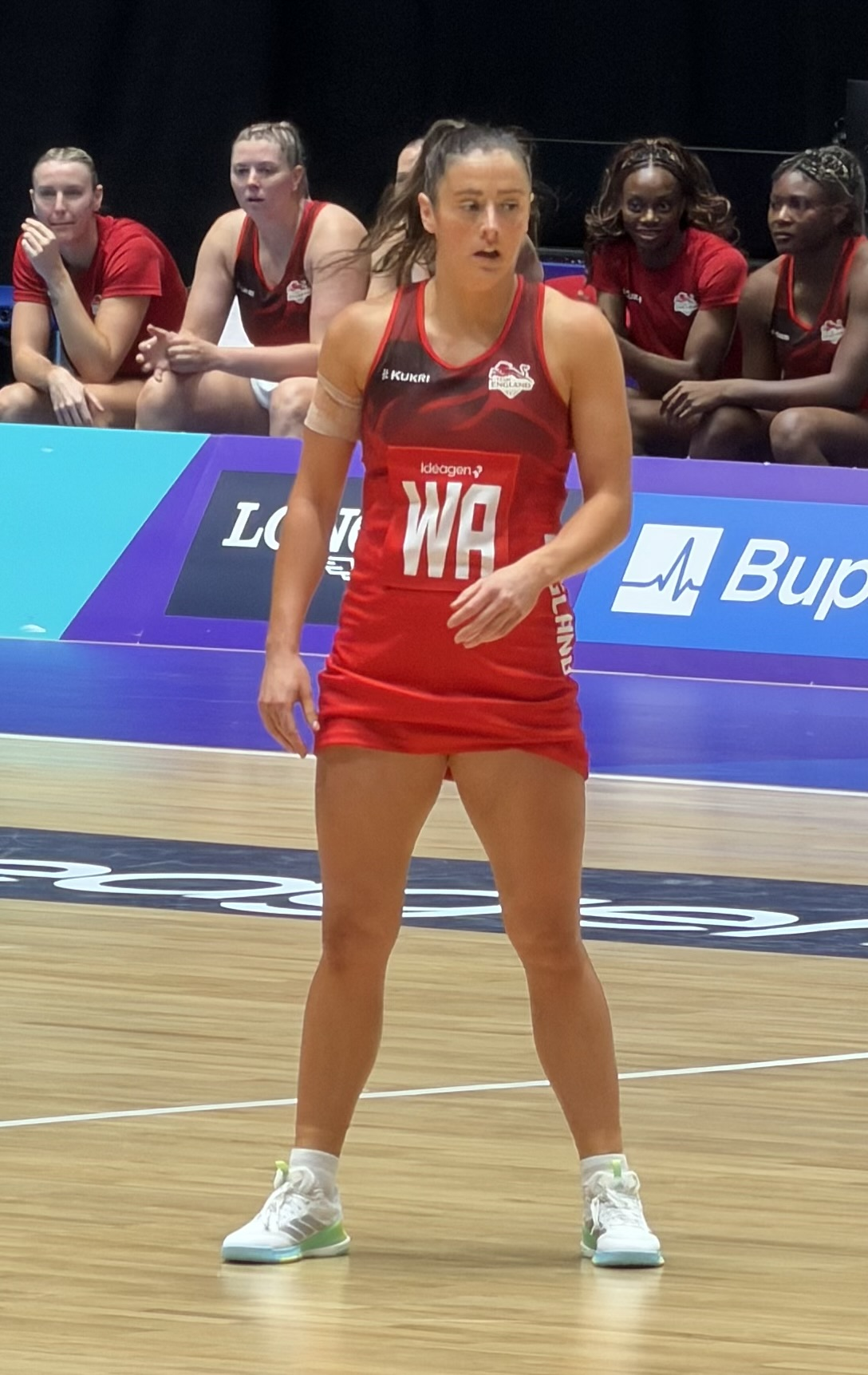
- Shaw at the 2026 Commonwealth Games

Personal information
- Full name: Jessica Shaw
- Nickname: Jess
- Born: 17 April 1996 (age 30) Stockport
- Height: 170 cm (5 ft 7 in)
- Relative: Rachel Shaw
- University: Leeds Beckett University

Netball career
- Playing positions: WA, C
Years	Club team	Apps
2016	Yorkshire Jets	
2017–2018	Team Bath	
2019–2020	Loughborough Lightning	
2021–2022	Team Bath	
2023–2024	Severn Stars	
2025	Birmingham Panthers	
2026	Loughborough Lightning	
Years	National team	Caps
2016–	England	10
- Updated on November 2025

Jessica 'Jess' Shaw (born 17 April 1996) is an English international netballer who currently plays for Loughborough Lightning in the Netball Super League.

== Early life and education ==
Shaw grew up in Stockport, Greater Manchester and first played netball for Stockport Netball Club.

== Club career ==
=== Yorkshire Jets ===
Shaw started her career at Yorkshire Jets, where she made her Netball Super League debut aged just 15.

=== Team Bath ===
Shaw moved to Team Bath for the 2017 Super League season joining her older sister Rachel.

=== Loughborough Lightning ===
After two seasons with Team Bath, Shaw joined Loughborough Lightning ahead of the 2019 Super League season.

=== Team Bath ===
Shaw returned to Team Bath for the 2021 Netball Super League season, where she secured victory in the British Fast5 Championships. However she suffered a double ankle fracture in training, resulting in an arthroscopic surgery to reconstruct two lateral ligaments. She missed the rest of the 2021 season, with the team finishing as runners-up in the 2021 league. She recommitted to Team Bath for the 2022 Netball Super League season.

=== Severn Stars ===
Shaw switched to Severn Stars for the 2023 Netball Super League season. During the 2024 Netball Super League season, she was named in the NSL 2024 All Star VII. After her injury at Bath, Shaw was considering retiring before rekindling her love at Stars.

=== Birmingham Panthers ===
Following the disbandment of Team Bath at the end of the 2024 Netball Super League season, Shaw joined Birmingham Panthers, one of two new entries in the relaunched “NSL 2.0”, which aimed to professionalise the league.

=== Loughborough Lightning ===
Shaw returned to Loughborough Lightning ahead of the 2026 Netball Super League season.

== International career ==
Shaw was among the first group of players to be selected for the full-time Vitality Roses programme when it was launched in 2016. She represented England at youth level, winning bronze with the U21 team at the 2017 Netball World Youth Cup in Botswana.

Shaw earned her senior call-up, when she travelled out to face Australia as an injury replacement player at the 2024 Australia England netball series. She made her debut in the third test In June 2026 Shaw was selected into the 2026 Commonwealth Games team.

== Personal life ==
Shaw was diagnosed with type 1 diabetes when she was 13.

== Honours ==
=== Team Bath ===
- Netball Super League: Runners up: 2021
- British Fast5 Championships: 2021

== Individual awards ==
=== Netball Super League ===
- All Star VII: 2024
