= Amy Carter (netball) =

English international netball player (born 1998)

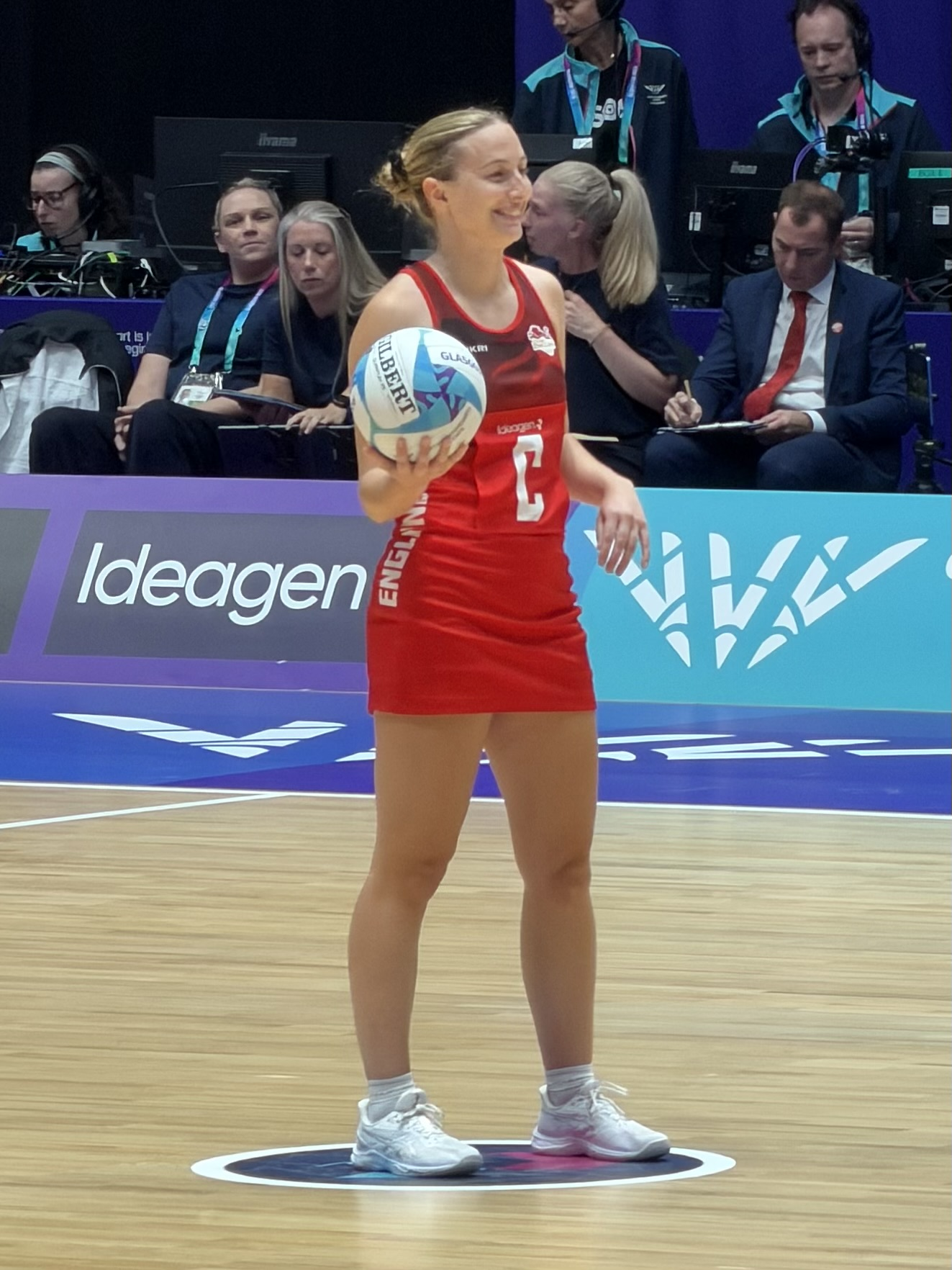
- Amy Carter at the 2026 Commonwealth Games

Personal information
- Born: 28 October 1998 (age 27) Greater Manchester, England
- Occupation: Doctor
- Height: 176 cm (5 ft 9 1/2 in)
- University: University of Manchester

Netball career
- Playing positions: C, WD
Years	Club team	Apps
2018-present	Manchester Thunder	
Years	National team	Caps
2013-2017	England U17-U21	
2018-2019	England Future Roses	
2020-present	England	22
- Updated on May 2025

Amy Carter (born 28 October 1998) is an English international netball player. She plays for Manchester Thunder in the Netball Super League and is a member of the England national netball team.

== Early life and education ==
Carter first joined Macclesfield Netball Club, aged 10 before moving to Tameside Netball Club in her mid-teens. She studied medicine at the University of Manchester.

== Club career ==
=== Manchester Thunder ===
Carter made her debut in the Netball Super League during the 2018 season after coming through the Manchester Thunder pathway. She achieved several Player of the Match accolades in her debut season and went on to be named Young Player of the Season. She won her first Netball Super League in 2019, when Thunder beat Surrey Storm in the grand final.

In 2021, Carter suffered an ACL rupture, causing her to miss the 2022 domestic and international season. She returned in 2023 where she helped Thunder to the Netball Super League play-offs. In the 2024 season Thunder finished runners-up to Loughborough Lightning in the Grand Final. Carter was named as captain for the 2025 Super League season. In the 2026 season Thunder defeated London Pulse 54-51 in the Grand Final to be named champions and Carter won her second title.

== International career ==
Carter has represented her country at Under-17, Under-19, and Under-21 level and was first included in the Roses Futures Programme in 2018. She played for England A against several nations before making her senior debut at the 2020 Netball Nations Cup. Carter was named as a travelling reserve for the 2023 Netball World Cup before being named in the squads for the 2023 and 2024 Taini Jamison Trophy Series and 2025 Netball Nations Cup where England earned a historic gold.

In June 2026 Carter was selected into the 2026 Commonwealth Games team and name as vice-captain.

Tournaments	Place
2020 Netball Nations Cup	3rd
2023 Taini Jamison Trophy Series	2nd
2024 Australia England netball series	2nd
2024 Taini Jamison Trophy Series	1st
2025 Netball Nations Cup	1st

== Personal life ==
Carter balances her netball with her job as a doctor.

== Honours ==
=== England ===
- Taini Jamison Trophy: 2024
- Netball Nations Cup: 2025, third place: 2020

=== Manchester Thunder ===
- Netball Super League: 2019, 2026 runners up: 2024

== Individual awards ==
=== Netball Super League ===
- Young Player of the Year: 2018
