= 2007–08 Netball Superleague season =

Netball Superleague season

- League: Netball Superleague
- Teams: 8
- TV partner: Sky Sports
- Champions: Galleria Mavericks
- Runners-up: Loughborough Lightning
- Season MVP: Pamela Cookey (Team Bath)

Seasons
- ← 2006–07 2008–09 →

The 2007–08 Netball Superleague season (known for sponsorship reasons as the Co-operative Netball Superleague) was the third season of the Netball Superleague. The league was won by Galleria Mavericks after they defeated Loughborough Lightning in the grand final. This was Mavericks first title win.

== Overview ==
The season started in October 2007 and was concluded in April 2008 with the grand final. Sky Sports continued to broadcast matches and The Co-operative Group became the Netball Superleague's new sponsor. Loughborough Lightning finished top of the table with the conclusion of the regular season but it was Galleria Mavericks who finished as champions after they defeated Lightning in the grand final.

== Teams ==
2007–08 Superleague teams	Home venue/base	Country/Region
Brunel Hurricanes	Guildford Spectrum	Greater London/South East England
Celtic Dragons	Welsh Institute of Sport	Wales
Galleria Mavericks	University of Hertfordshire	East of England
Leeds Carnegie	Leeds Metropolitan University	Yorkshire
Loughborough Lightning	Loughborough University	East Midlands
Northern Thunder	Bury, Greater Manchester	North West England
Team Bath	University of Bath	South West England/West of England
Team Northumbria	Gateshead	North East England

== Regular season ==
After winning 13 of their 14 matches, Loughborough Lightning finished top of the table with the conclusion of the regular season. The only team to beat Lightning during the regular season was Team Northumbria. With a team that included Megan Hutton, they enjoyed their best season in the Netball Superleague, finishing second during the regular season and qualifying for the play-offs.

=== Final table ===
2007–08 Netball Superleague
Pos	Team	Pld	W	D	L	GF	GA	PP	Pts	Qualification
1	Loughborough Lightning	14	13	0	1	769	505	152.3	26	Qualified for major semi-final
2	Team Northumbria	14	11	1	2	679	482	140.9	23	Qualified for major semi-final
3	Team Bath	14	9	0	5	715	491	145.6	18	Qualified for minor semi-final
4	Galleria Mavericks	14	9	0	5	630	471	133.8	18	Qualified for minor semi-final
5	Brunel Hurricanes	14	6	1	7	611	545	112.1	13	
6	Leeds Carnegie	14	5	0	9	555	740	75.0	10	
7	Celtic Dragons	14	1	0	13	482	753	64.0	2	
8	Northern Thunder	14	1	0	13	413	867	47.6	2	

== Play-offs ==
The play-offs utilised the Page–McIntyre system to determine the two grand finalists. This saw the top two from the regular season, Loughborough Lightning and Team Northumbria, play each other, with the winner going straight through to the grand final. The loser get a second chance to reach the grand final via the minor final. The third and fourth placed teams, Team Bath and Galleria Mavericks also play each other, and the winner advances to the minor final. The winner of the minor final qualifies for the grand final.

Major semi-final

15 March 2008	Loughborough Lightning	66–48	Team Northumbria	English Institute of Sport, Sheffield

Minor semi-final

15 March 2008	Galleria Mavericks	50–37	Team Bath	English Institute of Sport, Sheffield
15 March 2008	Scoring by quarter: 14–10, 22–21, 38–27, 50–37			English Institute of Sport, Sheffield

Minor final

29 March 2008	Galleria Mavericks	52–34	Team Northumbria	English Institute of Sport, Sheffield
29 March 2008	Scoring by quarter: 11–9, 25–18, 39–26, 52–34			English Institute of Sport, Sheffield

== Grand Final ==
5 April 2008	Galleria Mavericks	43–39	Loughborough Lightning	K2 Leisure Centre; Umpires: Joanna Kelly and Judith Groves	Sky Sports
5 April 2008	Scoring by quarter: 6–9, 14–21, 28–31, 43–39			K2 Leisure Centre; Umpires: Joanna Kelly and Judith Groves	Sky Sports
5 April 2008	Louisa Brownfield 32/37 (86%) ? Michelle Hall 9/11 (82%); Monique Wood 2/7 (29%)		Joanne Harten 24/30 (80%); Alex Wood 11/17 (65%); Becky James 4/8 (50%)	K2 Leisure Centre; Umpires: Joanna Kelly and Judith Groves	Sky Sports
