= England national netball team =

National netball team

England
- Nickname(s): Vitality Roses; The Roses
- Association: England Netball
- Confederation: Europe Netball
- Head coach: Anna Stembridge
- Captain: Fran Williams
- Most caps: Jade Clarke (208)
- World ranking: 3 ▲
Team colours	Alternate

First international
- England 25–3 Scotland; GEC Ground, Wembley, 7 May 1949

Netball World Cup
- Best result: 2nd (1975, 2023)

Commonwealth Games
- Appearances: 7 (Debuted in 1998)
- 2022 placing: 4th
- Best result: 1st (2018)

The England national netball team, also known as the Vitality Roses, represent England Netball in international netball tournaments such as the Netball World Cup, the Commonwealth Games, the Netball Quad Series, the Taini Jamison Trophy, the Fast5 Netball World Series and the Netball Europe Open Championships. They have also competed at the World Games. England made their Test debut in 1949. Their best result in a major tournament is a gold medal in the 2018 Commonwealth Games. As of 1 March 2026, England are ranked third in the World Netball Rankings.

== History ==
=== Early tests ===
England made their Test debut on 7 May 1949 with 25–3 win over Scotland. The match was played at the General Electric Company ground on Preston Road, Wembley during the 1949 England Scotland Wales netball series. England also played Wales for the first time on the same day, again winning 25–3. In 1954, England played Northern Ireland for the first time. On 12 May 1956, England hosted a touring Australia. It was the first time England played an overseas team. Australia won 14–11 at Harringay Arena before a crowd of more than 5,000. Later in 1956, England played an away series against South Africa, winning all three tests.

=== World Netball Rankings ===
Between 2008 and 2018, England were regularly ranked number three in the World Netball Rankings, behind Australia and New Zealand. In May 2018, after winning gold at the 2018 Commonwealth Games, they initially remained at number three. However in July 2018, they moved up to number two. This saw England became the first team to be ranked in the top two apart from Australia and New Zealand. After finishing as runners up at the 2019 Netball Quad Series and defeating both Australia and New Zealand, England returned to the number two position. In October 2024, England were ranked number two for a third time after defeating Australia in Australia during their 2024 series and then winning the 2024 Taini Jamison Trophy Series. As of 1 June 2025, England are ranked fourth in the World Netball Rankings.

== Tournament history ==
=== Netball World Cup ===
England have competed at every Netball World Cup since the inaugural 1963 tournament. Their best performances have been in 1975 and 2023 when on both occasions they finished second.

Tournaments	Place
1963 World Netball Tournament	3rd place, bronze medalist(s)
1967 World Netball Tournament	4th
1971 World Netball Tournament	3rd place, bronze medalist(s)
1975 World Netball Tournament	2nd place, silver medalist(s)
1979 World Netball Tournament	4th
1983 World Netball Tournament	4th
1987 World Netball Tournament	4th
1991 World Netball Championships	4th
1995 World Netball Championships	4th
1999 World Netball Championships	3rd place, bronze medalist(s)
2003 World Netball Championships	4th
2007 World Netball Championships	4th
2011 World Netball Championships	3rd place, bronze medalist(s)
2015 Netball World Cup	3rd place, bronze medalist(s)
2019 Netball World Cup	3rd place, bronze medalist(s)
2023 Netball World Cup	2nd place, silver medalist(s)
2027 Netball World Cup	

=== World Games ===
Between 1985 and 1993, England competed at the World Games.

Tournaments	Place
1985 World Games	4th
1989 World Games	3rd place, bronze medalist(s)
1993 World Games	4th

=== Commonwealth Games ===
England have competed at every netball tournament at the Commonwealth Games. Between 1998 and 2014, Australia and New Zealand contested every final and won every gold and silver medal between them. However, in 2018, England caused a major surprise when, with a team coached by Tracey Neville and captained by Ama Agbeze, they defeated Australia in the final. Helen Housby scored in the final second to give England a 52–51 victory. As a result England became only the third team to both reach the final and win the gold medal. At the 2018 BBC Sports Personality of the Year Awards, England's last second win over Australia was voted sporting moment of the year. England were also named Team of the Year.

Tournaments	Place
1998 Commonwealth Games	3rd place, bronze medalist(s)
2002 Commonwealth Games	4th
2006 Commonwealth Games	3rd place, bronze medalist(s)
2010 Commonwealth Games	3rd place, bronze medalist(s)
2014 Commonwealth Games	4th
2018 Commonwealth Games	1st place, gold medalist(s)
2022 Commonwealth Games	4th

=== Taini Jamison Trophy ===
Since 2008, Netball New Zealand has hosted the Taini Jamison Trophy series. The series features New Zealand playing against visiting teams. England competed in the inaugural 2008 series and have been regular participants ever since. In 2021, they won the series for the first time. It was the first time that England had won a series in New Zealand. The England team were coached by Jess Thirlby and captained by Serena Guthrie. In 2024, England won the series for a second time. The team was again coached by Thirlby and this time captained by Fran Williams.

Tournaments	Place
2008 Taini Jamison Trophy Series	2nd
2011 Taini Jamison Trophy Series	2nd
2014 Taini Jamison Trophy Series	2nd
2017 Taini Jamison Trophy Series	2nd
2020 Taini Jamison Trophy Series	2nd
2021 Taini Jamison Trophy Series	1st
2023 Taini Jamison Trophy Series	2nd
2024 Taini Jamison Trophy Series	1st

=== Netball Quad Series/Nations Cup ===
Since 2012, England have competed in the Netball Quad Series, playing against Australia, New Zealand and South Africa. In 2025, with a team coached by Jess Thirlby and captained by Fran Williams, England won the series for the first time after defeating South Africa 61–55 in the final. It proved sixth time lucky for England. Since the Nations Cup/Quad Series was established in 2012, England had finished as runners up five times.

Tournaments	Place
2012 Netball Quad Series	3rd
2016 Netball Quad Series	3rd
2017 Netball Quad Series (January/February)	3rd
2017 Netball Quad Series (August/September)	3rd
2018 Netball Quad Series (January)	2nd
2018 Netball Quad Series (September)	2nd
2019 Netball Quad Series	2nd
2020 Netball Nations Cup	3rd
2022 Netball Quad Series	2nd
2023 Netball Quad Series	3rd
2024 Netball Nations Cup	2nd
2025 Netball Nations Cup	1st

=== Fast5 Netball World Series ===
Since 2009, England have played in the Fast5 Netball World Series. In 2011, with a team coached by Anna Mayes and captained by Jade Clarke, England defeated New Zealand 33–26 in the final to win their first major tournament. In 2017, with a team coached by Tracey Neville and captained by Ama Agbeze, England won the series for a second time. In the final they defeated Jamaica 34–29.

Tournaments	Place
2009 World Netball Series	4th
2010 World Netball Series	2nd place, silver medalist(s)
2011 World Netball Series	1st place, gold medalist(s)
2012 Fast5 Netball World Series	2nd place, silver medalist(s)
2013 Fast5 Netball World Series	6th
2014 Fast5 Netball World Series	3rd place, bronze medalist(s)
2016 Fast5 Netball World Series	4th
2017 Fast5 Netball World Series	1st place, gold medalist(s)
2018 Fast5 Netball World Series	5th
2022 Fast5 Netball World Series	4th
2023 Fast5 Netball World Series	3rd place, bronze medalist(s)
2024 Fast5 Netball World Series	5th

=== Netball Europe Open Championships ===
England have regularly played in the Netball Europe Open Championships, playing against teams such as Northern Ireland, Scotland and Wales. England are the competition's most successful team.

Tournaments	Place
1998 FENA Open	
1999 FENA Open	
2000 FENA Open	
2001 FENA Open	2nd
2002 FENA Open	
2003 FENA Open	
2004 FENA Open	
2005 FENA Open	1st place, gold medalist(s)
2006 FENA Open	1st place, gold medalist(s)
2007 FENA Open	1st place, gold medalist(s)
2008 FENA Open	1st place, gold medalist(s)
2009 Netball Europe Open Championships	1st place, gold medalist(s)
2010 Netball Europe Open Championships	1st place, gold medalist(s)
2011 Netball Europe Open Championships	1st place, gold medalist(s)
2012 Netball Europe Open Championships	1st place, gold medalist(s)
2013 Netball Europe Open Championships	2nd place, silver medalist(s)
2015 Netball Europe Open Championships	1st place, gold medalist(s)
2016 Netball Europe Open Championships	1st place, gold medalist(s)
2017 Netball Europe Open Championships	1st place, gold medalist(s)
2019 Netball Europe Open Championships	1st place, gold medalist(s)

== Notable players ==
=== Current squad ===
England roster
Players
Coaches

Name	Pos	DOB	Height	Club	Nat	Caps
Halimat Adio	GK	27 January 1998 (age 28)	1.83 m (6 ft 0 in)	London Pulse	(England)
Imogen Allison	WD, C, WA	24 April 1998 (age 28)	1.80 m (5 ft 11 in)	Nottingham Forest Netball	(England)
Jasmine Brown	GK	26 November 2001 (age 24)	1.88 m (6 ft 2 in)	Manchester Thunder	(England)
Eleanor Cardwell	GA, GS	11 November 1994 (age 32)	1.86 m (6 ft 1 in)	Manchester Thunder	(England)
Amy Carter	C, WD	28 October 1998 (age 28)	1.76 m (5 ft 9 in)	Manchester Thunder	(England)
Ella Clark	GA, GS	8 February 1992 (age 34)	1.90 m (6 ft 3 in)	Loughborough Lightning	(England)
Funmi Fadoju	GD, GK, WD	15 August 2002 (age 24)	1.76 m (5 ft 9 in)	London Pulse	(England)
Sasha Glasgow	GS, GA	19 July 1998 (age 28)	1.87 m (6 ft 2 in)	West Coast Fever	(Australia)
Alice Harvey	GK, GD	3 April 2001 (age 25)	1.90 m (6 ft 3 in)	Loughborough Lightning	(England)
Helen Housby	GA, GS	19 January 1995 (age 31)	1.83 m (6 ft 0 in)	New South Wales Swifts	(Australia)
Natalie Metcalf	WA, GA	9 December 1992 (age 33)	1.74 m (5 ft 9 in)	Manchester Thunder	(England)
Berri Neil	GA, GS	12 February 2003 (age 23)	1.82 m (6 ft 0 in)	Loughborough Lightning	(England)
Natasha Pavelin	GD, WD, GK	22 April 1998 (age 28)	1.83 m (6 ft 0 in)	Nottingham Forest Netball	(England)
Lois Pearson	GA, WA	20 September 1999 (age 27)	1.76 m (5 ft 9 in)	Manchester Thunder	(England)
Jayda Pechova	GK, GD	20 August 2004 (age 22)	1.83 m (6 ft 0 in)	Nottingham Forest Netball	(England)
Izzi Phillips	WD, C	9 April 2006 (age 20)	1.79 m (5 ft 10 in)	London Mavericks	(England)
Alicia Scholes	WA, C	8 May 2001 (age 25)	1.63 m (5 ft 4 in)	London Pulse	(England)
Jessica Shaw	C, WA	17 April 1996 (age 30)	1.70 m (5 ft 7 in)	Loughborough Lightning	(England)
Gracie Smith	C, WD	6 October 2008 (age 18)	1.84 m (6 ft 0 in)	London Pulse	(England)
Olivia Tchine	GS	22 November 2000 (age 25)	1.91 m (6 ft 3 in)	London Pulse	(England)
Fran Williams (c)	GD, GK, WD	23 December 1997 (age 28)	1.85 m (6 ft 1 in)	West Coast Fever	(Australia)

Head coach

- Anna Stembridge

Assistant coach

- Olivia Murphy & Jo Harten

Manager: Paul Dring
Physiotherapist:
Julie Snow

Notes

- (c) – Captain
- (cc) – Co-captain
- (vc) – Vice-captain
- – Injury / maternity leave
- (TRP) – Temporary Replacement Player

=== Notable past players ===
==== England Netball's Hall of Fame ====
The following England netball internationals have been inducted into England Netball's Hall of Fame.

Inducted	Player	Appearances	Years
2001	Mary Thomas		1949
2001	Kendra Slawinski	128	1983–1995
2001	Mary French		1949–1957
2005	Anne Stephenson		1960s
2007	Colette Thomson	89	1975–198x
2008	Amanda Newton	100	1996–2008
2009	Karen Atkinson	100	1997–2011
2013	Sonia Mkoloma	123	1999–2015
2014	Jade Clarke	208	2003–
2015	Pamela Cookey	114	2004–2015
2015	Geva Mentor	175	2001–2023
2018	Olivia Murphy	95	1997–2006
2018	Tracey Neville	81	1996–2008
2018	Ama Agbeze		2001–
2020	Eboni Usoro-Brown	116	2008–2022
2020	Joanne Harten	117	2007–2023
2020	Maggie Jackson		1984–1987

==== Tournament winning captains ====
Captains	Tournaments
Jade Clarke	2011 World Netball Series
Ama Agbeze	2017 Fast5 Netball World Series; 2018 Commonwealth Games
Serena Guthrie	2021 Taini Jamison Trophy Series
Fran Williams	2024 Taini Jamison Trophy Series; 2025 Netball Nations Cup

==== 2018 Commonwealth Games gold medallists ====
The following England netball internationals were members of the squad that won the gold medal at the 2018 Commonwealth Games. At the 2018 BBC Sports Personality of the Year Awards, they were also named Team of the Year.

Player	Appearances	Years
Ama Agbeze		2001–
Eboni Beckford-Chambers	116	2008–2022
Jade Clarke	208	2003–
Beth Cobden	35	2016–
Kadeen Corbin	72	2011–2021
Jodie Gibson	25	2013–
Serena Guthrie	110	2008–2022
Joanne Harten	117	2007–2023
Natalie Haythornthwaite	86	2015–
Helen Housby	102	2014–
Geva Mentor	175	2001–2023
Chelsea Pitman	52	2017–2023

== Head coaches ==
Coach	Years
Rena Stratford	1956
Ellen Marsh	1963
Mary French	1967–1975
Joyce Wheeler	1979
Irene Beagles	1983
Gerry Cornwell	1985
Heather Crouch	1985–1987
Betty Galsworthy	1989–1991
Liz Broomhead	1993–1995
Mary Beardwood	1998–1999
Julie Hoornweg	1999–2002
Lyn Gunson	2002–2003
Margaret Caldow	2004–2007
Sue Hawkins	2007–2011
Maggie Jackson	2010
Colette Thomson	2011
Anna Mayes	2011–2015
Tracey Neville	2015–2019
Jess Thirlby	2019–2025
Liana Leota	2023
Anna Stembridge	2026–

== Honours ==
- World Netball Championships/Netball World Cup
  - Runners up: 1975, 2023
- Commonwealth Games
  - Winners: 2018
- Taini Jamison Trophy
  - Winners: 2021, 2024
  - Runners Up: 2008, 2011, 2014, 2017, 2020, 2023
- Netball Quad Series/Nations Cup
  - Winners: 2025
  - Runners Up: 2018 (January), 2018 (September), 2019, 2022, 2024
- Fast5 Netball World Series
  - Winners: 2011, 2017
  - Runners up: 2010, 2012
- Netball Europe Open Championships
  - Winners: 2005, 2006, 2007, 2008, 2009, 2010, 2011, 2012, 2015, 2016, 2017, 2019
  - Runner up: 2013
- BBC Sports Team of the Year Award
  - Winners: 2018
