= Halimat Adio =

English netball international (born 1998)

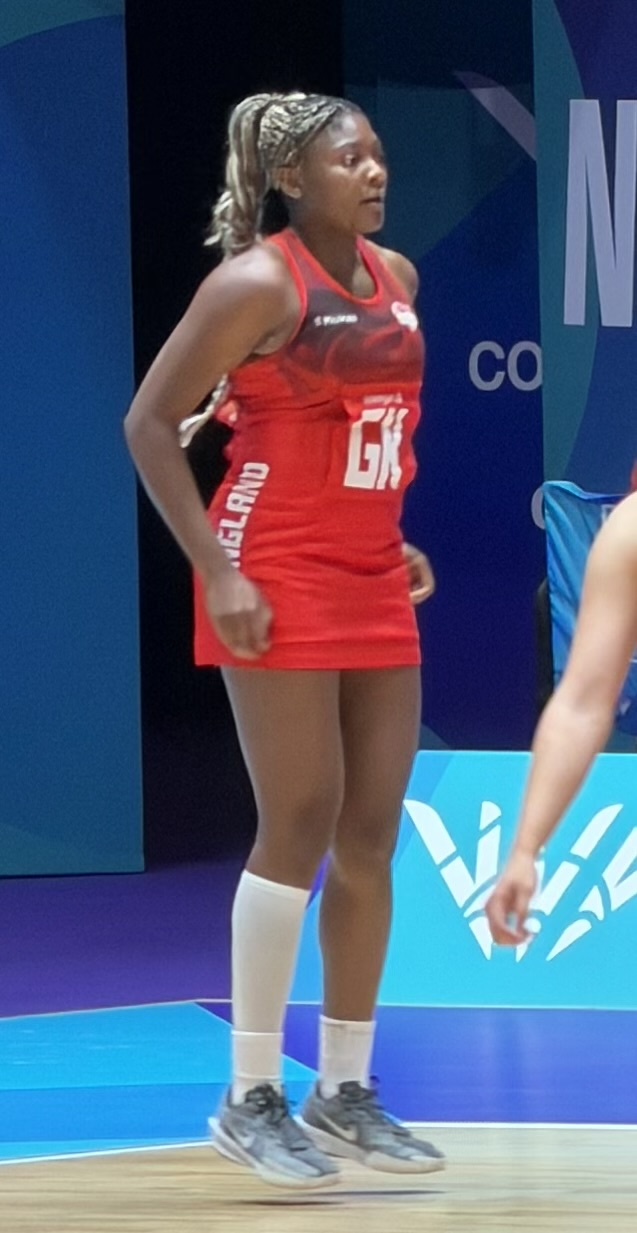
- Adio at the 2026 Commonwealth Games

Personal information
- Full name: Halimat Adio
- Nickname: Hali
- Born: 27 January 1998 (age 28) London, England
- Height: 183 cm (6 ft 0 in)
- University: Coventry University

Netball career
- Playing position: GK/GD
Years	Club team	Apps
2018	Wasps Netball	
2019	Severn Stars	
2020-present	London Pulse	
Years	National team	Caps
2023	England	17
- (Correct as of February 2026)

Halimat 'Hali' Adio (born 27 January 1998) is an England netball international. She plays for London Pulse in the Netball Super League, where she is vice-captain.

== Early life and education ==
Adio was born in London and went to Ashmole Academy where she began playing netball when she was in Year 9. Adio then went on to do her sixth form studies at Barking Abbey to be part of the netball academy. She has an older and a younger sister. Adio graduated from Coventry University with a first-class honours degree in BSc Biomedical Sciences in 2021. She managed her studies while playing for London Pulse and was awarded a Full Blue for her sporting achievements. Adio started studying a masters in Chemical Neuroscience but put it on hold to focus on the 2026 Commonwealth Games and 2027 Netball World Cup.

== Club career ==
=== Wasps Netball ===
Adio signed for Wasps Netball for the 2018 season. She joined the U21 side but provided cover for the first team for a couple of games.

=== Severn Stars ===
She signed for Severn Stars ahead of the 2019 season. She played five matches before getting injured.

=== London Pulse ===
Adio followed coach Sam Bird when she joined London Pulse ahead of the cancelled 2020 season. For the 2021 season she was named co-captain with Lindsay Keable. Adio missed the entirety of the 2022 season with a lateral meniscus tear. She returned to court in 2023 where she helped Pulse reach the Netball Super League Grand Final, and was part of the 2024 squad that finished third after defeat in the play-off semi finals. Adio won her first Super League Grand final in 2025, defeating Loughborough Lightning 53–45. In 2026 Adio reached a third Super League Grand final but lost to Manchester Thunder in the final.

== International career ==
Adio was selected into the Roses at U19 level, where she joined tours to Jamaica and South Africa. She was subsequently elevated to the U21s, however, an injury prevented her from appearing at the 2017 Netball World Youth Cup. In 2019, Adio was first selected for the Future Roses squad and played at the 2019 Netball Europe Open Championships in Northern Ireland.

Adio made her senior debut, co-captaining the Roses against the New Zealand Silver Ferns in the 2023 Taini Jamison Trophy on 24 September 2023. She was named in the squad for the 2024 Netball Nations Cup where England finished runners up and the 2025 Netball Nations Cup where England won gold.

In June 2026 Adio was selected into the 2026 Commonwealth Games team.

== Personal life ==
In her spare time Adio is head coach of Hyde Park Netball Club.

== Honours ==
=== England ===
- Netball Nations Cup: 2025 Runner up: 2024

=== London Pulse ===
- Netball Super League: 2025 Runner up: 2023, 2026
