= Alicia Scholes =

English netball player (born 2001)

Personal information
- Born: 8 May 2001 (age 25) Greater Manchester, England
- Height: 163 cm (5 ft 4 in)
- Relative: Paul Scholes (Father)
- School: Hulme Grammar School

Netball career
- Playing positions: WA, C
Years	Club team	Apps
2020–2021	Manchester Thunder	
2022–present	London Pulse	
Years	National team	Caps
2018–2021	England U17-U21	
2022	England Future Roses	
2023–present	England	8
- Updated on July 2025

Alicia Scholes (born 8 May 2001) is an English international netball player. She plays for London Pulse in the Netball Super League and is part of the English national team.

== Early life and education ==
Scholes is the daughter of Manchester United player Paul Scholes and his wife Claire Froggatt. She has a younger brother Aiden and older brother Aaron. Growing up in Oldham, Scholes started playing netball at Hulme Grammar School and later joined Oldham Netball Club where she rose through the age groups before then moving on to YWCA Bury at the age of 15 and playing in their Premier League squad.

== Club career ==
=== Manchester Thunder ===
Scholes was a member of the Manchester Thunder pathway. She was named in the senior squad for the 2020 Super League season. Her debut came in March 2021 against Severn Stars.

=== London Pulse ===
Scholes joined London Pulse in 2022. She helped Pulse reach the Netball Super League Grand Final in 2023, and was part of the 2024 squad that finished third after defeat in the play-off semi finals. Scholes won her first Super League Grand final in 2025, defeating Loughborough Lightning 53–45. In the 2026 season Pulse made the grand final but ultimately lost to Manchester Thunder 54–51. Scholes was named as WA in the All Star VII for the season.

== International career ==
Scholes was a member of England U17, U19 and U21 squads. She competed in the U17 tour of Australia in 2019 and U21 Netball Europe in 2019.

Scholes was selected for the Future Roses programme in 2022, debuting in the Fast5 Netball World Series in New Zealand. She later became a England Rose and made her senior debut against the New Zealand Silver Ferns in the 2023 Taini Jamison Trophy Series. She was part of the team that earned a historic win in the 2025 Netball Nations Cup.

Tournaments	Place
2022 Fast5 Netball World Series	4th
2023 Taini Jamison Trophy	2nd
2024 Fast5 Netball World Series	5th
2025 Netball Nations Cup	1st

== Personal life ==
Scholes runs Scholes Gym with her father and brother, a 10,000-square-foot facility in Oldham which opened in 2022.

== Honours ==
=== England ===
- Netball Nations Cup: 2025

=== London Pulse ===
- Netball Super League: 2025 Runners up: 2023

== Individual awards ==
=== Netball Super League ===
- All Star VII: 2026
