= Razia Quashie =

English netball player

Personal information
- Born: 16 September 1997 (age 28) Saint Vincent and the Grenadines
- Height: 185 cm (6 ft 1 in)
- University: Brunel University

Netball career
- Playing positions: GK, GD
Years	Club team	Apps
2017–present	Hertfordshire Mavericks	
Years	National team	Caps
2018–present	England	24
Medal record
Representing England
Fast5 World Series
Bronze medal – third place	2023 Christchurch	Fast5
- Updated on May 2025

Razia Quashie (born 16 September 1997) is a netball player who plays for England and the London Mavericks. She had her senior debut with the England national netball team in October 2018 in the Sunshine Series against Jamaica.

== Early life and education ==
Quashie was born on the south Caribbean islands of Saint Vincent and the Grenadines and played a range of sports as a child, crediting her mother for her interest in netball. She has a degree in Sports Science from Brunel University and also a Masters degree.

== Club career ==
=== London Mavericks ===
Quashie came through the London Mavericks pathway system and has played for the side since 2017. In 2019 she was named Players’ Player of the Season at Mavericks. Quashie suffered two serious Achilles injuries in 2021 and 2022 but returned in 2023.

== International career ==
Quashie represented England at the World Youth Cup. She made her senior debut against Jamaica in 2018. She won bronze with the England team at the 2023 Fast5 Netball World Series. Quashie was part of the team which won the 2024 Taini Jamison Trophy and 2025 Netball Nations Cup.

In September 2023, England Netball apologised after a social media post celebrating Quashie's birthday erroneously used the image of a different black player instead of Quashie.

== Honours ==
=== England ===
- Netball Nations Cup: 2025 Third: 2020
- Netball Quad Series: Runners up: 2019
- Taini Jamison Trophy: 2024
- Fast5 Netball World Series: Third: 2023
