= K2 Leisure Centre =

Leisure centre in Crawley, England

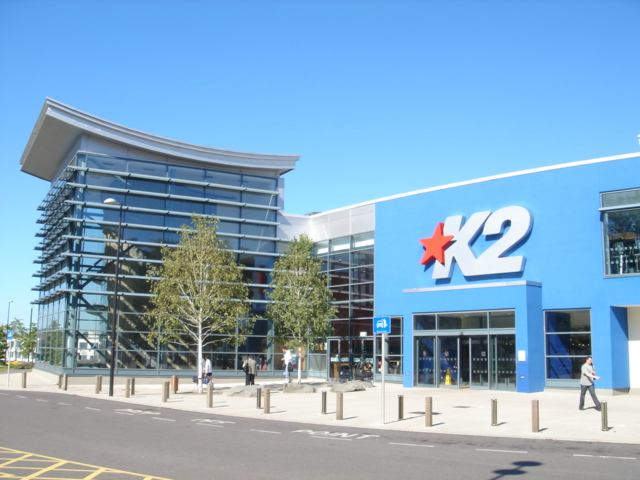
- K2 is named after the second highest mountain in the world

General information
- Location: Crawley, United Kingdom
- Coordinates: 51°5′50″N 0°11′29″W
- Completed: 2005

Technical details
- Floor area: 57,194 square metres (615,630 ft^{2})

Website
- https://www.everyoneactive.com/centre/k2-crawley/

K2 is a sports and leisure facility covering just over 57,000 m^{2} (610,000 sq ft) in Pease Pottage Hill Crawley, UK.

== Development ==
The building belongs to Crawley Borough Council and was completed in 2005 for £25.76m. It replaced Crawley leisure centre (built in 1964) the same year, which was sold for £32m in order to fund K2 (Crawley also received £5m through land swaps with the county council). John Thraves; Crawley Council member is quoted as saying "I am very pleased to tell rate-payers of Crawley that it has not cost them a penny" in an interview with the BBC. In January 2018 it received upgrades to its gym equipment worth £300,000.

== Management ==
In November 2018 it was taken over by SLM operating as Everyone Active, along with the gym, sports hall and café in the Bewbush Centre and the 3G pitch and pavilion in Broadfield.

== List of facilities ==
- Olympic size swimming pool
- Kid's Pool
- Gym
- Climbing wall
- Creche
- Sauna & Steam Room
- Indoor golf
- Sports shop
- Cafe
- Squash courts
- 8-Lane Running Track
- Athletic Equipment
- Hairdressers
- Racket Sports Facility
- Osteopath Clinic
- Bowls court
- Trampolines

== 2018 Snooker Open ==
K2 hosted the English Open snooker tournament in October 2018. On the first day of the open, current title holder, Ronnie O'Sullivan described the venue as "a bit of a hellhole", stating "all I can smell is urine." World Snooker responded to these comments praising the centre in a statement that said that "K2 Crawley is an excellent venue with very good facilities." World Champion Mark Williams concurred and is quoted as saying "We play in leisure centres all over the place and this is one of the better ones." Mark Davis reached his first career ranking final after beating O'Sullivan in the semi-final. Stuart Bingham went on to win the final, breaking down in tears following his victory, his first triumph since his return from a 6-month ban for betting on matches.

== See also ==
- West Sussex
- Thomas Bennett Community College
- Health Club
- New Towns Act 1946
