= Colette Thomson =

English netball player and coach

Colette Thomson MBE is a former member of the English netball team, playing 89 times. Since retiring in 1987 she has been a netball coach and has won several awards for her contribution to the game.

== Playing career ==
Thomson, a graduate of the University of Birmingham, played for England for 13 years. She received her first cap in 1975, making four appearances in the 1975 World Netball Tournament. She retired in 1987.

== Coaching career ==
After retiring, Thomson joined the Linden Netball Club as its first coach. Despite other coaching positions since then she has remained closely connected to the club, which competes in the England Netball Premier League, the highest level of amateur netball in England. Among those she has trained at Linden have been two English internationals, Beth Cobden and Layla Guscoth.

Thomson has coached teams in the Super League, the elite netball league in Great Britain. She was in charge at Team Bath when it won the first two seasons of the league in 2005 – 2007 and then became the head coach at Loughborough Lightning. She was also assistant coach at Wasps Netball.

Thomson joined the senior national coaching team in 2011. She was the coach for the England team in the 2013 Netball World Youth Cup and one of the coaches when England won its first a gold medal at the Commonwealth Games in 2018 and in the subsequent year when England came third in the 2019 Netball World Cup. In July 2021 she became the assistant coach for England's Under-21 team.

== Awards ==
Thomson has received the following awards and honours,

- 1990. British Institute of Sports Coaches, Coach of the Year.
- 2014. Member of the Order of the British Empire, Queen's Birthday Honours List 2014.
- 2019. Lifetime Achievement Award, University of Birmingham.
- 2019. Lifetime Achievement Award, The Sunday Times Sportswomen of the Year Awards.
- 2021. Honorary Doctorate, University of Birmingham.
- 2022. Special Recognition Award. England Netball, "The ONE Award".
- 2023. Club of the Season. England Netball. This inaugural award for the 2022-23 season specifically identifies the role played by Thomson.
