= London Mavericks =

Netball Superleague team

- Founded: 2005
- Based in: Hatfield, Hertfordshire
- Regions: East of England & Middlesex
- Home venues: Herts Sports Village, University of Hertfordshire; Wembley Arena
- Head coach: Tamsin Greenway
- Asst coach: Mikki Austin
- Captain: Ellie Rattu
- Premierships: 2008, 2011
- League: Netball Superleague
- Website: londonmavericks.co.uk
Home	Away

London Mavericks is an English netball team based at the University of Hertfordshire in Hatfield. Their senior team plays in the Netball Super League where they were a founding member in 2005–06. They are two time Super League champions in 2007–08 and 2011. Due to various sponsorship deals and partnership arrangements, the team has played under several different 'Mavericks' names. They adopted their current name ahead of the 2025 season. Previously the franchise represented just England Netball's East Region, however as London Mavericks this has expanded to include Middlesex from London and South East.

== History ==
=== Galleria Mavericks ===
Mavericks were originally established in 2005 as the Netball Super League franchise for the East of England. Together with Brunel Hurricanes, Celtic Dragons, Leeds Carnegie, Loughborough Lightning, Northern Thunder, Team Bath and Team Northumbria, the Mavericks were founder members of the league. The team was originally sponsored by The Galleria, an outlet store in Hatfield, and as a result were known as the Galleria Mavericks. After playing and losing in the first two Grand Finals, the Mavericks won their first Netball Super League title after defeating Loughborough Lightning by 43–39 in the 2007–08 Grand Final. Mavericks' Louisa Brownfield was the top scorer in the final. Other members of the team included Amanda Newton and Karen Atkinson.

=== Hertfordshire Mavericks ===
In 2009–10 the team was renamed Hertfordshire Mavericks. During this era they were also referred to as University of Hertfordshire Mavericks. In 2011, with a team featuring Louisa Brownfield, Layla Guscoth and Lindsay Keable, Mavericks' won their second Netball Super League title after defeating Surrey Storm by 57–46 in the Grand Final.

=== benecosMavericks ===
In July 2016 Mavericks signed a sponsorship deal with the natural beauty brand, benecos. In September 2017 benecos became Mavericks main sponsor and the team name changed from Hertfordshire Mavericks to benecosMavericks. They subsequently used this name during the 2018 season.

=== Saracens Mavericks ===
In January 2019 Mavericks formed a new partnership with the rugby union club, Saracens F.C. This saw the team become the Saracens Mavericks. They announced their split from Saracens at the end of the 2024 season.

=== London Mavericks ===
In May 2024 Mavericks announced its rebrand as London Mavericks as part of the 2025 Netball Super League relaunch. Tamsin Greenway was named as Director of Netball. In the 2025 season Mavericks finished in the top four for the first time since 2016, with the franchise finishing fifth in five of the last six seasons.

== Senior finals ==
=== Netball Super League Grand Finals ===
Between 2006 and 2011, Mavericks played in six successive Netball Super League Grand Finals.

Season	Winners	Score	Runners up	Venue
2005–06	Team Bath	43–35	Galleria Mavericks	Guildford Spectrum
2006–07	Team Bath	53–45	Galleria Mavericks	Guildford Spectrum
2007–08	Galleria Mavericks	43–39	Loughborough Lightning	K2 Leisure Centre
2008–09	Team Bath	54–46	Galleria Mavericks	Coventry Skydome
2009–10	Team Bath	51–44	Hertfordshire Mavericks	Trent FM Arena
2011	Hertfordshire Mavericks	57–46	Surrey Storm	Herts Sports Village
2015	Surrey Storm	56–39	Hertfordshire Mavericks	Copper Box Arena

=== Fast5 Netball All-Stars Championship ===
Season	Winners	Score	Runners up	Venue
2018	Wasps Netball	42–32	benecosMavericks	Copper Box Arena

== Home venue ==
Mavericks play their home games at the University of Hertfordshire, Wembley Arena, Brentwood Centre, Essex and Brighton Sports Centre.

== Notable players ==
=== 2026 squad ===
2026 London Mavericks roster
Players
Coaching staff

Nat.	Name	Position(s)	DoB	Height
(England)	Emma Thacker (vc) (injured)	GA, GS	22 August 2003	1.90 m (6 ft 3 in)
(England)	Razia Quashie (injured)	GK, GD	16 September 1997	1.83 m (6 ft 0 in)
(England)	Ellie Rattu (c) (injured)	C, WD	4 April 2000	1.77 m (5 ft 10 in)
(England)	George Inger	GS, GA	30 September 1998	1.88 m (6 ft 2 in)
(England)	Isabella Phillips	C, WD, GD	9 April 2006	1.79 m (5 ft 10 in)
(England)	Suzie Liveseidge	GA, WA	1 June 2001	1.77 m (5 ft 10 in)
(England)	Amelia Hall	C, WA, GA	29 April 1999	1.70 m (5 ft 7 in)
(Australia)	Emily Andrew	GS	28 February 2003	1.91 m (6 ft 3 in)
(Australia)	Jemma Donoghue	GD, WD	10 June 2001	1.83 m (6 ft 0 in)
(South Africa)	Jamie Van Wyk	GD, WD	31 October 2000	1.83 m (6 ft 0 in)
(England)	Hannah Knightbridge	C, WA		–
(England)	Eleanor Sadler	GK, GD		–
(England)	Sophie Egbaran	GA, GS		1.84 m (6 ft 0 in)

Head coach

- Tamsin Greenway

Assistant coach

- Mikki Austin

Notes

- (c) – Captain
- (cc) – Co-captain
- (vc) – Vice-captain
- – Injury / maternity leave
- (TRP) – Temporary Replacement Player
Player profiles: Team website
Last updated: 2 January 2026

=== Internationals ===
England

- Halimat Adio
- Ama Agbeze
- Karen Atkinson
- Louisa Brownfield
- Ella Clark
- Kadeen Corbin
- Sasha Corbin
- Shaunagh Craig
- Chloe Essam
- George Fisher
- Jodie Gibson
- Layla Guscoth
- Jo Harten
- Lindsay Keable
- Amanda Newton
- Vicki Oyesola
- Razia Quashie

Northern Ireland
- Shaunagh Craig
- Michelle Drayne

Australia
- Karyn Bailey
- Samantha May

New Zealand
- Keshia Grant
- Joline Henry

Jamaica
- Jhaniele Fowler

Trinidad and Tobago

- Jameela McCarthy
- Samantha Wallace

== Head coaches ==
Maggie Jackson was the head coach when Mavericks were Netball Super League champions in both 2007–08 and 2011. In addition to being named head coach, both Robyn Broughton and Kathryn Ratnapala were given the role of Director of Netball.

Camilla Buchanan became the current head coach of London Mavericks in 2023, having played at the club since 2008. Tamsin Greenway was named Director of Netball ahead of the 2025 season and she became head coach ahead of the 2026 season.

Coach	Years
(England) Maggie Jackson	2005–2008
(England) Kendra Slawinski	2009–20xx
(England) Maggie Jackson	c. 2011
(England) Karen Atkinson	20xx–2014
(England) Sam Bird	2014–2016
(New Zealand) Robyn Broughton	2016–2017
(England) Kathryn Ratnapala	2017–2022
(England) Camilla Buchanan	2023–2025
(England) Tamsin Greenway	2026-

Director of Netball	Years
(New Zealand) Robyn Broughton	2016–2017
(England) Kathryn Ratnapala	2017-2022
(England) Tamsin Greenway	2025-

== Pathway ==
London Mavericks region consist of 8 counties where it supports the development of talent and participation. These are Bedfordshire, Cambridgeshire, East Essex, Essex Thurrock, Hertfordshire, Norfolk and Suffolk from England Netball's East Region and expanded to include Middlesex from London and South East during its rebrand to London Mavericks.

In this region Mavericks offers NXT Gen (U23), U19, U17 and U15 squads as well as 6 x player development pathway squads (including a U21 team) and Mavericks Future programs.

It has 6 partner schools: Queenswood School, Berkhamsted School, Samuel Ryder Academy, The Bishop's Stortford High School and Stephen Perse Foundation.

== Honours ==
- Netball Super League
  - Winners: 2007–08, 2011: 2
  - Runners up: 2005–06, 2006–07, 2008–09, 2009–10, 2015: 5
- British Fast5 Netball All-Stars Championship
  - Runners up: 2018: 1
