= Serena Guthrie =

Jersey politician and former netball player (born 1990)

Serena Guthrie MBE
Personal information
- Full name: Serena Guthrie
- Born: 5 January 1990 (age 36)
- Occupation: Politician
- Height: 1.80 m (5 ft 11 in)
- Relative: Kurtis Guthrie
- School: Le Rocquier School; Ralph Allen School
- University: Bath Spa University

Netball career
- Playing positions: WD, C, WA
| Years | Club team | Apps |
| 2007–2014 | Team Bath | |
| 2015–16 | Northern Mystics | |
| 2017–18 | Giants Netball | |
| 2019–2022 | Team Bath | |
| Years | National team | Caps |
| 2008–2022 | England | 100 |
Medal record
Representing England
World Netball Championships
| Bronze medal – third place | 2019 Liverpool | Netball |
| Bronze medal – third place | 2011 Singapore | Netball |
Commonwealth Games
| Gold medal – first place | 2018 Gold Coast | Netball |
World Netball Series
| Gold medal – first place | 2011 Liverpool | Fastnet |
| Silver medal – second place | 2012 Auckland | Fast5 |

Serena Monique Guthrie MBE (born 5 January 1990) is a politician and former netball player from Jersey. She was elected as a Senator in the States Assembly at the 2026 Jersey general election. Guthrie previously played internationally for England.

== Political career ==
At the 2026 Jersey general election, Guthrie was elected as Senator in the States Assembly. She is associated with the political movement Value Jersey.

== Netball career ==
Guthrie played in the Centre, Wing Attack and Wing Defence positions. She was a dynamic player, known for her speed and athleticism, with a keen eye for the intercept. She made the squad in 2008, debuting soon after when she was just 17 years old, and earned over 50 caps for her country.

In domestic netball, she played for Team Bath until 2015, when she signed with the Northern Mystics in New Zealand, having previously trained with the team in 2012. In 2017 Guthrie began playing for Giants Netball in the Australian Suncorp Super Netball league. In her time at the Giants, Guthrie was a formidable player, winning the club MVP award for the 2017 season and becoming one of the league's premier mid-courters.

She left the Super Netball league at the end of the 2018 season, saying she wanted to return to the United Kingdom in 2019. She announced she would return to her old club Team Bath from 2019.

Guthrie played in the 2009 Netball World Youth Championships where she was vice captain. She won a gold medal in 2011 World Netball Series as well as a bronze medal at the 2011 Netball World Championships. She was also a part of the team that whitewashed Australia in January 2013, the first time the Diamonds had been whitewashed in a series since 2004. Guthrie was an influential contributor to England's gold medal successes at the 2017 Fast5 Netball World Series and 2018 Commonwealth Games. She was appointed captain of the team for the series against Uganda in November 2018. Guthrie was also granted the honour of captain for the Roses' 2019 Netball World Cup campaign.

== Honours and retirement ==
Guthrie was named Jersey Sportsperson of the Year in 2014.

Guthrie was appointed Member of the Order of the British Empire (MBE) in the 2020 New Year Honours for services to netball.

On 9 March 2022, Guthrie retired from netball after announcing her pregnancy.
