= Vicki Oyesola =

English netball player (born 1998)

Personal information
- Full name: Vicki Oyesola
- Born: 16 January 1998 (age 28)
- Height: 180 cm (5 ft 11 in)
- School: St Helen's School
- University: Loughborough University

Netball career
- Playing positions: GD, WD
Years	Club team	Apps
2016	Hertfordshire Mavericks	
2017-2020	Loughborough Lightning	
2021-2023	Leeds Rhinos Netball	
2024-present	London Mavericks	
Years	National team	Caps
- England U17-U21
2017-present	England	
- Updated on April 2025

Vicki Oyesola (born 16 January 1998) is an English international netball player. She plays for London Mavericks in the Netball Super League and is part of the English national team.

== Early life and education ==
Oyesola attended St Helen's School in Northwood, London before studying MEng Mechanical Engineering at Loughborough University where she graduated in 2021.

== Club career ==
=== Saracens Mavericks ===
Oyesola made her Netball Super League debut in 2016 at the then-named Saracens Mavericks where she had been a member of their pathway.

=== Loughborough Lightning ===
She joined Loughborough Lightning ahead of the 2017 season where she would also be studying at Loughborough University. That season Lightning made the grand final where they ultimately lost to Wasps Netball. Oyesola was named the Netball Super League's 2017 Young Player of the Season. Oyesola made the grand final the following season with Lightning where she lost to Wasps Netball for a second time. In the 2019 Netball Superleague season Lightning lost to Wasps Netball in the semis and to Manchester Thunder to place fourth.

=== Leeds Rhinos ===
Ahead of the 2021 Netball Superleague season Oyesola joined new franchise Leeds Rhinos Netball. In the clubs first season in the Super League Oyesola helped Rhinos make the semi-finals where they lost to old club Loughborough Lightning. In the 2023 Netball Superleague season Oyesola was named as the Players Player of the Season and also selected in the All Star VII.

=== London Mavericks ===
Oyesola re-joined London Mavericks for the 2024 season. In her second season back with Mavericks she suffered a season ending knee injury in the first round fixture against Cardiff Dragons and was replaced with Amy Hepworth-Wain.

== International career ==
Oyesola made her debut for the England Roses at Netball Europe in 2017. She was part of the Roses tour to New Zealand in 2020 and has been selected for the 2020, 2021 and 2023 Taini Jamison Trophy Series, winning in 2021.

== Personal life ==
Oyesola works as a Data Analyst.

== Honours ==
=== England ===
- Taini Jamison Trophy: 2021

=== Loughborough Lightning ===
- Netball Super League: Runners up: 2017, 2018

== Individual awards ==
=== Netball Super League ===
- Young Player of the Year: 2017
- Players Player of the Season: 2023
- All Star VII: 2023
