= Samantha May =

Australian netball player (born 1987)

Personal information
- Born: 16 September 1987 (age 38) Sydney, Australia
- Height: 1.83 m (6 ft 0 in)
- University: University of Hertfordshire

Netball career
- Playing positions: GD, WD, GK
Years	Club team	Apps
2005–2006	Sydney Swifts	13
2007	AIS Canberra Darters	
2008	Australian Institute of Sport	
2009–2013	New South Wales Swifts	
2011	→ NNSW Waratahs	
2014–2016	Hertfordshire Mavericks	
2016–2019	Wasps	
2017–2019	→ University of Hertfordshire	
2019–2021	Loughborough Lightning	
Coaching career
- Years: Team
- 2014–: Hatfield Netball Club
- 2014–2016: Highgate School
- 2016–: Haileybury
- 2019–: Loughborough College

Samantha May (born 16 September 1987), also known as Sam May, is a former Australian netball player who played for Hertfordshire Mavericks, Wasps and Loughborough Lightning in the Netball Superleague, featuring in five grand finals in 2015, 2017, 2018, 2019 and 2021, winning three times. In Australia, May played for Sydney Swifts and AIS Canberra Darters in the Commonwealth Bank Trophy and for New South Wales Swifts in the ANZ Championship.

== Early life and education ==
Between 2017 and 2019 May attended the University of Hertfordshire and gained a BSc in Business and Sports Management. May also played netball for the University of Hertfordshire at BUCS intervarsity level.

== Playing career ==
=== Australia ===
Sydney Swifts

May made 13 appearances for Sydney Swifts in the Commonwealth Bank Trophy.

AIS Canberra Darters

In 2007 May played for AIS Canberra Darters in the Commonwealth Bank Trophy.

AIS

In 2008 May played for the Australian Institute of Sport in the Australian Netball League.

NSW Swifts

Between 2009 and 2013, May played for NSW Swifts in the ANZ Championship. In March 2009 she made her debut for Swifts in a pre-season tournament. She then made her ANZ Championship debut in Round 1 of the 2009 season in a match against Canterbury Tactix. In 2011 May was a member of the NNSW Waratahs team that won the Australian Netball League title.

National team

Between 2007 and 2008, May represented Australia at under-21 level. She had earlier represented Australia at under-17 level.

=== Netball Superleague ===
Hertfordshire Mavericks

Between 2014 and 2016, May played for Hertfordshire Mavericks in the Netball Superleague. In 2015 she played in her first Netball Superleague grand final, but finished on losing team as Mavericks lost 56–39 to Surrey Storm.

Wasps

Between 2017 and 2019, May played for Wasps. May helped Wasps win two successive Netball Superleague titles and played in two further grand finals in 2017 and 2018.

Loughborough Lightning

In 2019 May signed for Loughborough Lightning. She was subsequently a member of the Lightning team that won the 2019 British Fast5 Netball All-Stars Championship. On 22 June 2021, May announced her retirement from elite netball, following in the footsteps of fellow announcers Karyn Bailey and Jo Trip. In her penultimate game with Loughborough Lightning, she was the POM and after winning the grand final with them on Sunday 27 June 2021, she retired.

== Coaching career ==
May has worked as a netball coach at several schools and netball clubs including Highgate School, Haileybury and Loughborough College.

== Honours ==
=== Loughborough Lightning ===
- Netball Superleague
  - Winners: 2021
- British Fast5 Netball All-Stars Championship
  - Winners: 2019

=== Wasps Netball ===
- Netball Superleague
  - Winners: 2017, 2018

=== Hertfordshire Mavericks ===
- Netball Superleague
  - Runners up: 2015

=== NNSW Waratahs ===
- Australian Netball League
  - Winners: 2011
