= Beth Cobden =

English international netball player (born 1993)

Beth Durant
Personal information
- Full name: Beth Durant
- Born: 3 February 1993 (age 33) Stafford, England
- Height: 1.78 m (5 ft 10 in)
- Relative: Jack Cobden (brother)
- University: University of Manchester

Netball career
- Playing positions: WD, C
Years	Club team	Apps
2011–2015	University of Manchester	
2011–2012	Northern Thunder	
2012–2015	→ Manchester Thunder	
2016–2018	Loughborough Lightning	
2019	Adelaide Thunderbirds	
2020	→ Southern Force	
2021– 2026	Loughborough Lightning	
Years	National team	Caps
2012	Great Britain	
2016–2026	England	50
Medal record
Representing England
Commonwealth Games
Gold medal – first place	2018 Gold Coast	Team
Fast5 Netball World Series
Gold medal – first place	2017 Sydney	Team
Representing Great Britain
World University Netball Championship
Gold medal – first place	2012 Cape Town	Team

Beth Durant (née Cobden; born 3 February 1993) is an English international netball player. She plays for Loughborough Lightning in the Netball Super League and is a member of the England national netball team. She won gold with England at the 2017 Fast5 Netball World Series and the 2018 Commonwealth Games.

She was a member of the Northern Thunder/Manchester Thunder team that won Netball Super League titles in 2012 and 2014. She won a further three Super League titles with Loughborough Lightning including their first ever title in 2021 and subsequent 2023 and 2024 wins.

== Early life and education ==
Durant is the daughter of Ian and Pat Cobden. She was raised in Staffordshire, living in Heath Hayes and Lichfield and attending Five Ways Primary School in Cannock. Her older brother, Jack Cobden, is a former England under-20 rugby union international who subsequently represented Romania at senior level. Another brother, Joe Cobden, represented England at under-18 level.

Durant was introduced to netball by her mother. She subsequently began playing for local clubs, Newhall and Parkside. The Sutton Coldfield–based Parkside club also produced players like Ama Agbeze and Layla Guscoth. Between 2011 and 2015 Durant attended the University of Manchester where she gained a BA in Accounting and Finance. Together with Helen Housby, she also represented University of Manchester in BUCS netball competitions.

== Club career ==
=== Manchester Thunder ===
Between 2011 and 2015 Durant played for Northern Thunder/Manchester Thunder. She was a member of the Thunder teams that won Netball Super League titles in 2012 and 2014.

=== Loughborough Lightning ===
Between 2016 and 2018 Durant played for Loughborough Lightning. She was a member of the Lightning team that won the 2017 British Fast5 Netball All-Stars Championship. She was also a member of the squad for the 2017 and 2018 Netball Super League grand finals. In the 2018 final Durant suffered an anterior cruciate ligament injury and was taken off after just 14 minutes. She was named in the All Star VII as WD for both the 2017 and 2018 seasons.

=== Adelaide Thunderbirds ===
In 2019 Durant signed for Adelaide Thunderbirds of Suncorp Super Netball. However, in a round three match against Melbourne Vixens she again suffered an anterior cruciate ligament injury and subsequently missed the rest of season. Durant was not included in the Thunderbirds 2020 squad but was subsequently included in the Southern Force 2020 squad.

=== Loughborough Lightning ===
Durant re-joined Loughborough Lightning for the 2021 season, after returning from a 3rd ACL rupture, and help the team defeat Team Bath in the grand final to become Super League champions. Durant was named 2021 Player of the Season and Player of the Match in the grand final. In the 2022 season she was unable to play in the final few rounds of the league and the grand final due to an injury to her calf but was still named in the All Star VII as WD. In the 2023 Netball Super League season she played WD in the second half of the grand final and became a Super League champion once more. She won her fifth super league title and third with Lightning in 2024. Lightning made the 2025 Super League grand final but they lost 45-53 to London Pulse to finish runners up. In May 2026 Durant announced that she would retire from netball at the end of the season.

== International career ==
=== England ===
Durant made her senior debut for England in 2016 against Australia. In June 2016 she was given a full-time contract by England Netball. She was subsequently a member of the England teams that won gold medals at the 2017 Fast5 Netball World Series and started all seven games in the 2018 Commonwealth Games, helping the Roses win their first gold medal.

Durant missed the 2018–19 international season, including the 2019 Netball World Cup because of injuries. She has won the Taini Jamison Trophy twice, in 2021 and 2024, the first of which was England’s first series win in New Zealand. In 2024 she helped England win their first Netball Nations Cup, starting at WD in the final against South Africa. She recorded her 50th cap for England at the England New Zealand test series in November 2025.

Tournaments	Place
2016 Netball Quad Series	3rd
2016 Fast5 Netball World Series	4th
2017 Netball Quad Series (January/February)	3rd
2017 Netball Quad Series (August/September)	3rd
2017 Taini Jamison Trophy Series	2nd
2017 Fast5 Netball World Series	1st place, gold medalist(s)
2018 Netball Quad Series (January)	2nd
2018 Commonwealth Games	1st place, gold medalist(s)
2021 Taini Jamison Trophy Series	1st
2024 Australia England netball series	2nd
2024 Taini Jamison Trophy Series	1st
2025 Netball Nations Cup	1st
2025 England New Zealand netball series	2nd

=== Great Britain ===
Durant was a member of the Great Britain team that won the gold medal at the 2012 World University Netball Championship.

== Coaching career ==
While playing for Loughborough Lightning, Durant and her teammates, Hannah Joseph and Natalie Panagarry coached at Ratcliffe College. While playing with Adelaide Thunderbirds she worked as a youth coach for Netball South Australia.

== Honours ==
=== England ===
- Commonwealth Games: 2018
- Fast5 Netball World Series: 2017
- Taini Jamison Trophy: 2021, 2024
- Quad Series/Nations Cup: 2025, runners up: 2018 (Jan)

=== Great Britain ===
- World University Netball Championship: 2012

=== Manchester Thunder ===
- Netball Super League: 2012, 2014

=== Loughborough Lightning ===
- Netball Super League: 2021, 2023, 2024, runners up: 2017, 2018, 2022, 2025
- British Fast5 Netball All-Stars Championship: 2017

== Individual honours ==
=== Netball Super League ===
- Player of the Season: 2021
- All Star VII: 2017, 2018, 2022
