= 2017 Team Bath netball season =

Team Bath netball season

Team Bath netball
- 2017 season
- Head coach: Anna Stembridge
- Captain: Eboni Beckford-Chambers
- Main venue: Team Bath Arena; Sports Training Village; University of Bath

Season results
- Wins–losses: 11–9
- Regular season: 4th
- Finals placing: 4th
- Team colours

Team Bath netball seasons
- ← 2016 2018 →

The 2017 Team Bath netball season saw Team Bath finish fourth overall in the 2017 Netball Superleague. Team Bath won seven games in a row to finish fourth in the regular season. Their qualification for the play-offs was only secured on the last day. In the semifinal they were beaten by Loughborough Lightning. They went on to finish fourth overall after defeat to Manchester Thunder in the 3rd/4th place play-off.

== Squad ==
2017 Team Bath roster
Players
Coaching staff

Nat.	Name	Position(s)	DoB	Height
(England)	Imogen Allison	WD, C, WA	24 April 1998 (aged 18)	1.74 m (5 ft 9 in)
(England)	Eboni Beckford-Chambers (c)	GD, GK	4 February 1988 (aged 29)	1.85 m (6 ft 1 in)
(England)	Samantha Cook	GK, GD		1.81 m (5 ft 11 in)
(England)	Layla Guscoth	GD, GK	2 March 1992 (aged 24)	1.84 m (6 ft 0 in)
(Wales)	Chelsea Lewis	GS, GA	24 November 1993 (aged 23)	1.88 m (6 ft 2 in)
(England)	Paige Reed	GS, GA	9 July 1997 (aged 19)	1.77 m (5 ft 10 in)
(England)	Mia Ritchie	C, WA	7 February 1990 (aged 27)	1.65 m (5 ft 5 in)
(England)	Laura Rudland	GA, WA	6 November 1994 (aged 22)	1.74 m (5 ft 9 in)
(England)	Jess Shaw	C, WA	17 April 1996 (aged 20)	1.74 m (5 ft 9 in)
(England)	Rachel Shaw	GA, WA	29 April 1992 (aged 24)	1.78 m (5 ft 10 in)
(England)	Jazz Scott	C, WA	21 March 1994 (aged 22)	1.68 m (5 ft 6 in)
(Jamaica)	Shantal Slater	GS, GA	24 January 1992 (aged 25)	1.95 m (6 ft 5 in)
(Wales)	Amanda Varey	C, WA	5 November 1987 (aged 29)	1.67 m (5 ft 6 in)
(Jamaica)	Vangelee Williams	GK, GD, WD	26 May 1992 (aged 24)	1.83 m (6 ft 0 in)

Head coach

- Anna Stembridge
  Director Of Netball: Jess Thirlby

Notes

- (c) – Captain
- (cc) – Co-captain
- (vc) – Vice-captain
- – Injury / maternity leave
- (TRP) – Temporary Replacement Player
Player profiles: Team website
Last updated: 12 February 2020

== Preseason ==
Mike Greenwood Trophy

Team Bath reached the final of the Mike Greenwood Trophy but lost to Netball Superleague newcomers Wasps.

10 December 2016	Team Bath	25–14	Celtic Dragons

10 December 2016	Team Bath	24–13	Hertfordshire Mavericks

10 December 2016	Team Bath	26–18	Manchester Thunder

10 December 2016	Team Bath	15–19	Wasps

10 December 2016	Team Bath	15–22	Wasps

Tri-Tournament

On 7 January 2017 Team Bath hosted and won a three team tournament which also featured Loughborough Lightning and Wasps.

7 January 2017	Team Bath	39–26	Loughborough Lightning	University of Bath

7 January 2017	Team Bath	36–27	Wasps	University of Bath

== Regular season ==
=== Fixtures and results ===
Date	Opponents	H/A	Result	Win/Loss
18 February 2017	Celtic Dragons	A	41–51	W
25 February 2017	Hertfordshire Mavericks	A	42–49	W
6 March 2017	Loughborough Lightning	H	41–47	L
11 March 2017	Severn Stars	A	39–48	W
20 March 2017	Surrey Storm	H	46–52	L
24 March 2017	Team Northumbria	H	47–38	W
31 March 2017	Scottish Sirens	A	51–45	L
7 April 2017	Manchester Thunder	H	41–48	L
14 April 2017	Hertfordshire Mavericks	H	45–46	L
17 April 2017	Loughborough Lightning	A	40–49	L
22 April 2017	Celtic Dragons	H	58–48	W
28 April 2017	Severn Stars	H	59–33	W
1 May 2017	Surrey Storm	A	49–56	W
8 May 2017	Wasps	H	55–53	W
15 May 2017	Team Northumbria	A	44–56	W
19 May 2017	Scottish Sirens	H	63–47	W
29 May 2017	Manchester Thunder	A	45–57	W
3 June 2017	Wasps	A	49–35	L

=== Final table ===
2017 Netball Superleague ladder
Pos	Team	Pld	W	D	L	GF	GA	GD	Pts	Qualification
1	Loughborough Lightning (I)	18	17	0	1	1104	882	+222	51	Qualified for the Final Four
2	Wasps (I)	18	14	0	4	1068	863	+205	42	Qualified for the Final Four
3	Manchester Thunder (I)	18	13	0	5	1016	941	+75	39	Qualified for the Final Four
4	Team Bath (I)	18	11	0	7	892	821	+71	33	Qualified for the Final Four
5	Surrey Storm (I)	18	10	0	8	1077	996	+81	30	
6	Scottish Sirens	18	9	0	9	988	963	+25	27	
7	Hertfordshire Mavericks (I)	18	6	0	12	897	1002	−105	18	
8	Severn Stars (I)	18	5	0	13	847	993	−146	15	
9	Team Northumbria (I)	18	3	0	15	884	1068	−184	9	
10	Celtic Dragons	18	2	0	16	852	1096	−244	6	

(I) Invited to play in the 2017 British Fast5 Netball All-Stars Championship

== Playoffs ==
=== Semi-final ===
10 June 2017	Loughborough Lightning	66–45	Team Bath	Barclaycard Arena
10 June 2017	Scoring by quarter: 16–10, 29–22, 52–32, 66–45			Barclaycard Arena

=== 3rd/4th place play-off ===
11 June 2017; 14:30	Manchester Thunder	56–48	Team Bath	Barclaycard Arena
11 June 2017; 14:30	Scoring by quarter: 17–11, 28–25, 42–33, 56–48			Barclaycard Arena
11 June 2017; 14:30	?		Chelsea Lewis	Barclaycard Arena

== Team Bath end-of-season awards ==
Award	Winners
Players' Player of the Year	Rachel Shaw
Coaches' Player of the Year	Layla Guscoth
Fans' Player of the Year	Samantha Cook
Endeavour Award	Imogen Allison
