= Hannah Joseph =

England international netball player

Personal information
- Full name: Hannah Joseph
- Born: 8 February 1994 (age 32)
- Relatives: Jonathan Joseph; Will Joseph

Netball career
- Playing positions: C, WA
Years	Club team	Apps
2011-present	Loughborough Lightning	
Years	National team	Caps
2016-present	England	19
- Updated on May 2025

Hannah Joseph (born 8 February 1994) is an English international netball player. She plays for Loughborough Lightning in the Netball Super League and is a member of the England national netball team. Joseph has won 3 Super League titles.

== Early life and education ==
Joseph's father is originally from Grenada and played for the Northampton Saints rugby union team in the 1980s. Her brothers Jonathan Joseph and Will Joseph are also professional rugby union players who have represented England.

== Club career ==
=== Loughborough Lightning ===
Joseph joining Loughborough Lightning in 2011 and made her debut in the 2013 Netball Superleague season making her one of the clubs longest-serving players. She made the Super League grand final in 2017 and 2018 but lost to Wasps Netball both times. She underwent achilles reconstruction surgery in 2017.

Joseph won her first Super League title in 2021, defeating Team Bath. Joseph would go on to make four consecutive grand finals, winning back to back titles in 2023 and 2024. Lightning made the 2025 Super League grand final but they lost 45-53 to London Pulse to finish runners up.

== International career ==
Joseph earned her first cap with England in 2016 during a series with Australia. She was part of the squad that won the 2021 Taini Jamison Trophy series. Joseph then won silver at the 2024 Netball Nations Cup.

She was named in the squad for the 2024 Australia test series and 2025 Horizon test series vs Jamaica.

== Personal life ==
Joseph works as the Director of Netball at Uppingham School.

== Honours ==
=== England ===
- Taini Jamison Trophy: 2021
- Netball Nations Cup: 2024

=== Loughborough Lightning ===
- Netball Super League: 2021, 2023, 2024 Runners up: 2017, 2018, 2022, 2025
