= Natalie Panagarry =

English netball player (born 1990)

Nat Panagarry
Personal information
- Full name: Natalie Panagarry
- Born: 27 December 1990 (age 35) Preston, England
- Height: 170 cm (5 ft 7 in)
- School: Arnold School
- University: Leeds Beckett

Netball career
- Playing positions: C, WD
Years	Club team	Apps
2009	Leeds Carnegie	
2015-present	Loughborough Lightning	
Years	National team	Caps
2016–present	England	18
Medal record
Representing England
Netball World Cup
Bronze medal – third place	2019 Liverpool	Netball
- Updated on May 2025

Nat Panagarry (born 27 December 1990) is an English netballer who has won back-to-back Netball Super League titles as captain of Loughborough Lightning and a bronze medal at the 2019 Netball World Cup.

== Early life and education ==
Panagarry started playing netball at the age of 9. She attended Leeds Beckett University.

== Club career ==
Panagarry played for Yorkshire Jets while she studied at Leeds Beckett University.

=== Loughborough Lightning ===
She took a break from netball to work full time and travel, before being recruited to Loughborough Lightning by coach Karen Atkinson. She won her first Super League title with Lightning in 2021 before captaining the team to back-to-back titles in 2023 and 2024. Panagarry has made 6 Super League grand finals and was named in the Netball Super League All Star VII in 2019 and 2024. Lightning made the 2025 Super League grand final but they lost 45–53 to London Pulse to finish runners up.

== International career ==
Panagarry made her England Roses debut in 2016 against Australia have representing England at Under-17 and Under-19 level.

She was selected in the England squad for the 2019 Netball World Cup, where the team won a bronze medal.

== Personal life ==
She became engaged during the 2023 COVID-19 lockdown period and married her wife Katie in November 2023. She has spoken about the support that netball provided as her wife underwent cancer treatment throughout the 2023–24 season.

== Honours ==
=== England ===
- Netball World Cup: Bronze: 2019

=== Loughborough Lightning ===
- Netball Super League: 2021, 2023, 2024 Runner up: 2017, 2018, 2022, 2025
