= 2021 Taini Jamison Trophy Series =

International netball series

Tournament details
- Host country: New Zealand
- City: Christchurch
- Venue: Christchurch Arena
- Dates: 20–24 September 2021
- Teams: 2
- TV partner(s): Sky Sport (New Zealand); TVNZ 2 Sky Sports (UK/Ireland)

Final positions
- Champions: England (1st title)
- Runners-up: New Zealand

Tournament statistics
- Matches played: 3
- Top scorer(s): George Fisher; 80/86 (93%)

The 2021 Taini Jamison Trophy Series, also known as the 2021 Cadbury Netball Series, was the 12th Taini Jamison Trophy series. It featured New Zealand playing England in three netball test matches, played in September 2021. All three tests were played at Christchurch Arena. New Zealand won the opening test 48–42. However, England won the series 2–1 after winning the final two tests, 55–45 and 49–45 respectively. In both the second and third tests, England launched second half comebacks before emerging as winners. It was the first time that England had won a series in New Zealand and the first time they won the Taini Jamison Trophy. The England team were coached by Jess Thirlby and captained by Serena Guthrie. The series was broadcast live on Sky Sport in New Zealand and on Sky Sports in the United Kingdom and Ireland. In New Zealand, TVNZ 2 also broadcast the matches with a one hour delay.

== Impact of COVID-19 pandemic ==
Both New Zealand and England found their preparations for the series disrupted by the COVID-19 pandemic. New Zealand's preparations for the series were disrupted by alert levels, which prevented players from training together before the series. The New Zealand team only had three days preparation before the series started. Four Auckland-based players, Gina Crampton, Sulu Fitzpatrick, Peta Toeava and Grace Nweke were given special dispensation by New Zealand's Ministry of Health, allowing them to travel to Christchurch. However New Zealand's coaching staff were not permitted to travel and New Zealand had to assemble a new set of South Island-based coaching staff especially for the series. Travel restrictions also prevented four of England's Suncorp Super Netball players – Natalie Haythornthwaite, Stacey Francis-Bayman, Helen Housby and Jo Harten – from travelling to New Zealand. The England team also had to spend time in quarantine before the series.

Both New Zealand and England were also due to play Australia in October 2021. New Zealand were due to defend the Constellation Cup. However both series' were subsequently cancelled due to the COVID-19 pandemic.

== Squads ==
=== New Zealand ===
New Zealand roster
Players
Coaches

Name	Pos	DOB	Height	Club	Nat	Caps
Karin Burger	WD, GD, GK	12 April 1993 (aged 28)	1.84 m (6 ft 0 in)	Mainland Tactix
Gina Crampton (c)	WA, C	7 December 1991 (aged 29)	1.74 m (5 ft 9 in)	Northern Stars
Sulu Fitzpatrick (c)	GK, GD, WD	20 August 1992 (aged 29)	1.88 m (6 ft 2 in)	Northern Mystics
Maddy Gordon	C, WA, WD	16 January 2000 (aged 21)	1.74 m (5 ft 9 in)	Central Pulse
Kate Heffernan	WD, C, WA	7 October 1999 (aged 21)	1.81 m (5 ft 11 in)	Southern Steel
Jamie Hume	GA, GS	22 March 1996 (aged 25)	1.82 m (6 ft 0 in)	Northern Stars
Kelly Jury	GK, GD	22 October 1996 (aged 24)	1.92 m (6 ft 4 in)	Central Pulse
Claire Kersten	WD, C	9 July 1989 (aged 32)	1.75 m (5 ft 9 in)	Central Pulse
Paris Lokotui	WD, C	17 October 2001 (aged 19)	1.82 m (6 ft 0 in)	Central Pulse
Tiana Metuarau	GA, WA, GS	15 January 2001 (aged 20)	1.83 m (6 ft 0 in)	Central Pulse
Grace Nweke	GS	7 February 2002 (aged 19)	1.93 m (6 ft 4 in)	Northern Mystics
Kimiora Poi	C, WA	1 November 1997 (aged 23)	1.68 m (5 ft 6 in)	Mainland Tactix
Shannon Saunders	C, WA	12 October 1990 (aged 30)	1.78 m (5 ft 10 in)	Southern Steel
Te Paea Selby-Rickit	GS, GA	14 January 1992 (aged 29)	1.93 m (6 ft 4 in)	Mainland Tactix
Peta Toeava	WA, C	10 March 1994 (aged 27)	1.61 m (5 ft 3 in)	Northern Mystics
Georgia Tong	GD, GK	30 October 1994 (aged 26)	1.83 m (6 ft 0 in)	Waikato Bay of Plenty Magic
Maia Wilson	GS, GA	21 September 1997 (aged 23)	1.87 m (6 ft 2 in)	Northern Stars
Samantha Winders (c)	WD, C, WA	5 June 1995 (aged 26)	1.71 m (5 ft 7 in)	Waikato Bay of Plenty Magic

Head coach

- Noeline Taurua

Manager:
Dayna Kaio
Physiotherapist:
Sharon Kearney
Strength and conditioning:
John Wilson

Notes

- (c) – Captain
- (cc) – Co-captain
- (vc) – Vice-captain
- – Injury / maternity leave
- (TRP) – Temporary Replacement Player

Captaincy

Ahead of the series, Gina Crampton was named captain. She subsequently captained New Zealand for the first test. However she sat out the second test with a hip strain and Sulu Fitzpatrick assumed the captaincy for the second test. However, Fitzpatrick also became injured, so Samantha Winders captained New Zealand for the third test.

Debuts

- Tiana Metuarau made her senior debut for New Zealand in the first test & earned Player of the Match.
- Grace Nweke made her senior debut for New Zealand in the second test.
- Georgia Tong made her senior debut for New Zealand in the third test.

=== England ===
England roster
Players
Coaches

Name	Pos	DOB	Height	Club	Nat	Caps
Imogen Allison	WD, C, WA	24 April 1998 (aged 23)	1.80 m (5 ft 11 in)	Team Bath		2
Eleanor Cardwell	GS, GA	11 November 1994 (aged 26)	1.86 m (6 ft 1 in)	Manchester Thunder		30
Ella Clark	GA, GS	8 February 1992 (aged 29)	1.91 m (6 ft 3 in)	Loughborough Lightning		5
Jade Clarke	WD, C, WA	17 October 1983 (aged 37)	1.74 m (5 ft 9 in)	Leeds Rhinos		179
Beth Cobden	WD, C	3 February 1993 (aged 28)	1.78 m (5 ft 10 in)	Loughborough Lightning		26
Rhea Dixon	GS, GA, WA	5 November 1997 (aged 23)	1.78 m (5 ft 10 in)	Leeds Rhinos		0
Sophie Drakeford-Lewis	GA, GS	10 December 1998 (aged 22)	1.79 m (5 ft 10 in)	Team Bath		5
George Fisher	GS	30 September 1998 (aged 22)	1.88 m (6 ft 2 in)	Southern Steel		15
Layla Guscoth	GD, GK	2 March 1992 (aged 29)	1.84 m (6 ft 0 in)	Team Bath		26
Serena Guthrie (c)	WD, C, WA	5 January 1990 (aged 31)	1.80 m (5 ft 11 in)	Team Bath		100
Hannah Joseph	WA, C	8 February 1994 (aged 27)	1.67 m (5 ft 6 in)	Loughborough Lightning		3
Geva Mentor	GK, GD, WD	17 September 1984 (aged 37)	1.91 m (6 ft 3 in)	Collingwood Magpies		146
Laura Malcolm	C, WD, WA	20 May 1991 (aged 30)	1.75 m (5 ft 9 in)	Manchester Thunder		31
Vicki Oyesola	GD, WD	16 January 1998 (aged 23)	1.80 m (5 ft 11 in)	Leeds Rhinos		6
Fran Williams	GD, GK, WD	5 January 1996 (aged 25)	1.88 m (6 ft 2 in)	Wasps Netball		16

Head coach

- Jess Thirlby

Assistant coach

- Liana Leota

Notes

- (c) – Captain
- (cc) – Co-captain
- (vc) – Vice-captain
- – Injury / maternity leave
- (TRP) – Temporary Replacement Player

== Matches ==
=== First Test ===
20 September 2021; 19:30; NZT	Stats	New Zealand	48–42	England
20 September 2021; 19:30; NZT	Stats	Scoring by quarter: 12–11, 26–21, 38–38, 48–42
20 September 2021; 19:30; NZT	Stats	Maia Wilson 31/39 (79%); Tiana Metuarau 17/19 (89%)		George Fisher 22/23 (96%); Eleanor Cardwell 16/22 (73%); Sophie Drakeford-Lewis 4/4 (100%)

=== Second Test ===
22 September 2021; 19:30; NZT	New Zealand	45–55	England
22 September 2021; 19:30; NZT	Scoring by quarter: 10–7, 24–21, 37–34, 45–55
22 September 2021; 19:30; NZT	Grace Nweke 16/20 (80%); Te Paea Selby-Rickit 15/18 (83%); Tiana Metuarau 9/10 (90%); Maia Wilson 5/7 (71%)		George Fisher 45/47 (96%); Sophie Drakeford-Lewis 9/9 (100%); Eleanor Cardwell 1/4 (25%)

=== Third Test ===
24 September 2021; 19:30; NZT	New Zealand	45–49	England
24 September 2021; 19:30; NZT	Scoring by quarter: 12–12, 26–16, 36–32, 45–49
24 September 2021; 19:30; NZT	Maia Wilson 29/33 (88%); Te Paea Selby-Rickit 16/20 (80%)		Eleanor Cardwell 25/26 (96%); George Fisher 13/16 (81%); Sophie Drakeford-Lewis 11/12 (92%)
