= Ama Agbeze =

England netball international (born 1982)

Ama Agbeze MBE
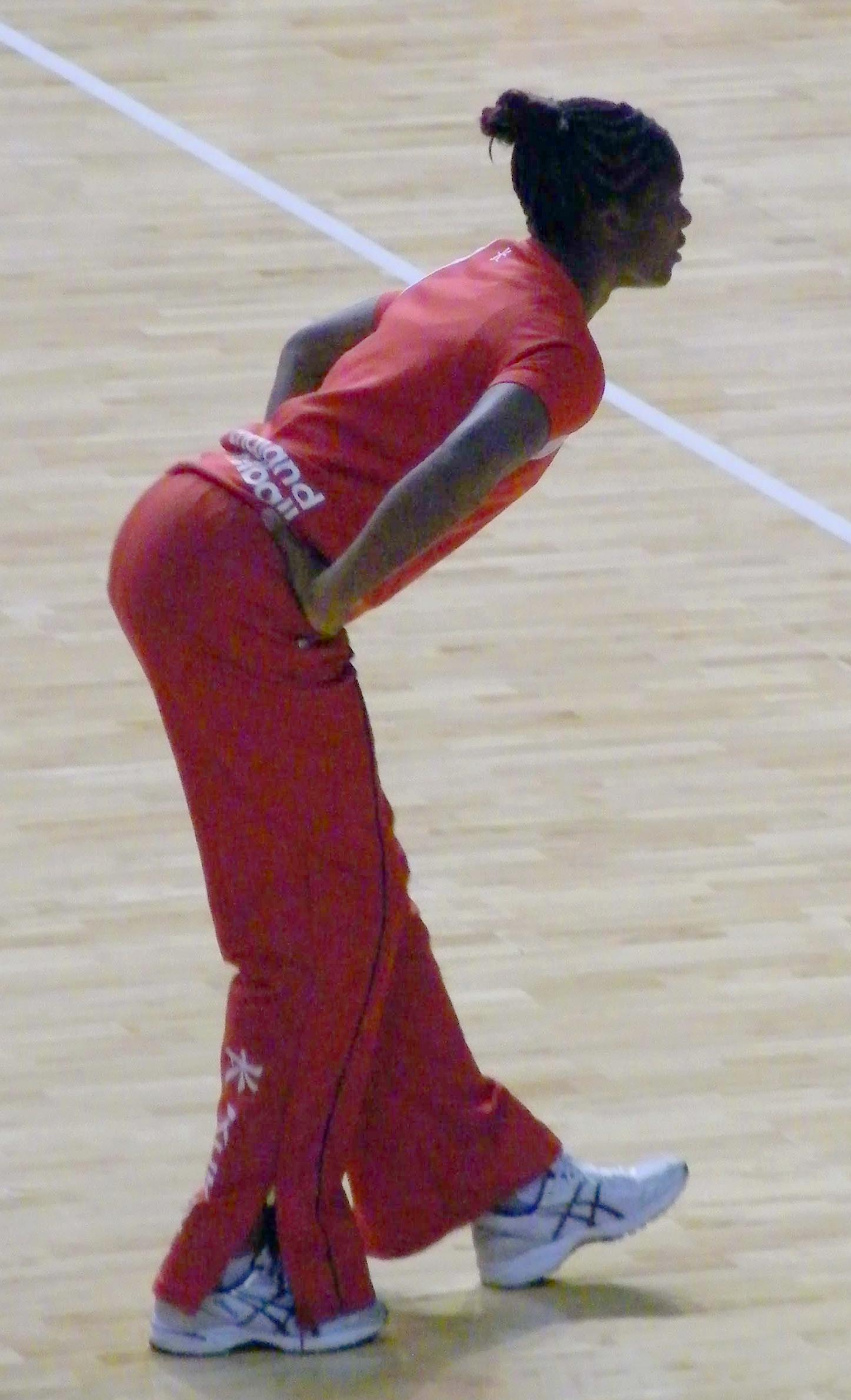

Personal information
- Born: 12 November 1982 (age 44) Selly Oak, England
- Height: 1.84 m (6 ft 0 in)
- School: Kings Norton Girls' School; Monkton Combe School
- University: Loughborough University; University of Leicester

Netball career
- Playing positions: GD, GK, WD
Years	Club team	Apps
2001–2002	Team Bath	
2003	Birmingham Blaze	
2004	Northumbria Flames	
2004–2007	Loughborough Lightning	
2005	→ London Hurricanes	
2008	West Coast Fever	
2008–2009	Leeds Carnegie	
2009	Melbourne Vixens	
2010	Central Pulse	
2011	West Coast Fever	
2012–2013	West Coast Falcons	
2013	Territory Storm	
2014–2015	Central Pulse	
2016	Loughborough Lightning	
2017	Adelaide Thunderbirds	
2018	Northern Stars	
2019	London Pulse	
2019	Saracens Mavericks	
2020	Severn Stars	
2021	Northern Mystics	
Years	National team	Caps
2001–	England	100
Medal record
Representing England
Commonwealth Games
Gold medal – first place	2018 Gold Coast	Team
Bronze medal – third place	2006 Melbourne	Team
Fast5 Netball World Series
Gold medal – first place	2017 Melbourne	Team
- Updated on 31 March 2020

Ama Agbeze MBE (born 12 November 1982) is a former England netball international. She was captain when England won the gold medal at the 2018 Commonwealth Games. In 2019 she received an MBE for her services to netball. She was also a member of the England team that won the bronze medal at the 2006 Commonwealth Games. As of 2020, Agbeze has played for at least sixteen different club teams in England, Australia and New Zealand.

== Early life, family and education ==
Agbeze was born to Nigerian parents in Birmingham. She has two older sisters and a younger brother. She was educated at Kings Norton Girls' School and Monkton Combe School. Between 2004 and 2007 she attended Loughborough University where she gained an MSc in Finance and Management. She also studied Law and Criminal Justice at the University of Leicester and is a qualified lawyer. In 2016 she married Fred Donovan, a New Zealander, in Auckland.

== Playing career ==
=== Super Cup ===
During the Super Cup era, between 2001 and 2005, Agbeze played for Team Bath, Birmingham Blaze, Northumbria Flames and London Hurricanes.

=== Netball Superleague ===
Between 2005 and 2007, while attending Loughborough University, Agbeze played for Loughborough Lightning in the Netball Superleague. She would return to Lightning for a second spell in 2016. She also played for Leeds Carnegie during the 2008–09 season.

Agbeze spent the 2019 Netball Superleague season at London Pulse, then joined up with Saracens Mavericks for the 2019 British Fast5 Netball All-Stars Championship before joining Severn Stars for the 2020 season.

=== Australia and New Zealand ===
Agbeze played for three franchises in the ANZ Championship. In 2008 she was one of several England internationals to join the new league. Together with Karen Atkinson, she signed for West Coast Fever. She subsequently moved to the Melbourne Vixens for the 2009 season and then to Central Pulse for the 2010 season. In 2011 she returned to West Coast Fever. During 2012 Agbeze served as a player-coach for West Coast Falcons, helping them win the West Australian Netball League. She was also awarded the Jill McIntosh Medal. In 2013 she played for Territory Storm in the Australian Netball League, then rejoined Central Pulse for the 2014 and 2015 ANZ Championship seasons. She subsequently played for Adelaide Thunderbirds during the 2017 Suncorp Super Netball season and for Northern Stars during the 2018 ANZ Premiership season. She played for Northern Mystics during the 2021 ANZ Premiership season.

=== England ===
Agbeze made her senior debut for England in 2001. She was a member of the England team that won the bronze medal at the 2006 Commonwealth Games. In 2016 she was appointed England captain She subsequently captained England as they won the 2016 Netball Europe Open Championships, the 2017 Fast5 Netball World Series and the gold medal at the 2018 Commonwealth Games. In October 2018, Agbeze made 100th senior appearance for England during a series against Jamaica. In 2019 she received an MBE for her services to netball.

At the 2022 Commonwealth Games, Agbeze appeared as an analyst for the BBC's coverage of the netball.

Tournaments	Place
2006 Commonwealth Games	3rd place, bronze medalist(s)
2007 World Netball Championships	4th
2011 Taini Jamison Trophy Series	2nd
2012 Netball Quad Series	3rd
2014 Commonwealth Games	4th
2014 Taini Jamison Trophy Series	2nd
2014 Fast5 Netball World Series	3rd
2016 Netball Europe Open Championships	1st place, gold medalist(s)
2016 Netball Quad Series	3rd
2016 Fast5 Netball World Series	4th
2017 Netball Quad Series (January/February)	3rd
2017 Netball Quad Series (August/September)	3rd
2017 Taini Jamison Trophy Series	2nd
2017 Fast5 Netball World Series	1st place, gold medalist(s)
2018 Netball Quad Series (January)	2nd
2018 Commonwealth Games	1st place, gold medalist(s)
2018 Netball Quad Series (September)	2nd

== Honours ==
England

- Commonwealth Games
  - Winners: 2018: 1
- Fast5 Netball World Series
  - Winners: 2017: 1
- Netball Europe Open Championships
  - Winners: 2016: 1
- Netball Quad Series
  - Runners up : 2018 (Jan), 2018 (Sep): 2

Melbourne Vixens

- ANZ Championship
  - Winners: 2009

Northern Mystics

- ANZ Premiership
  - Winners: 2021
