= Fran Williams =

English netball player (born 1997)

Francesca Williams
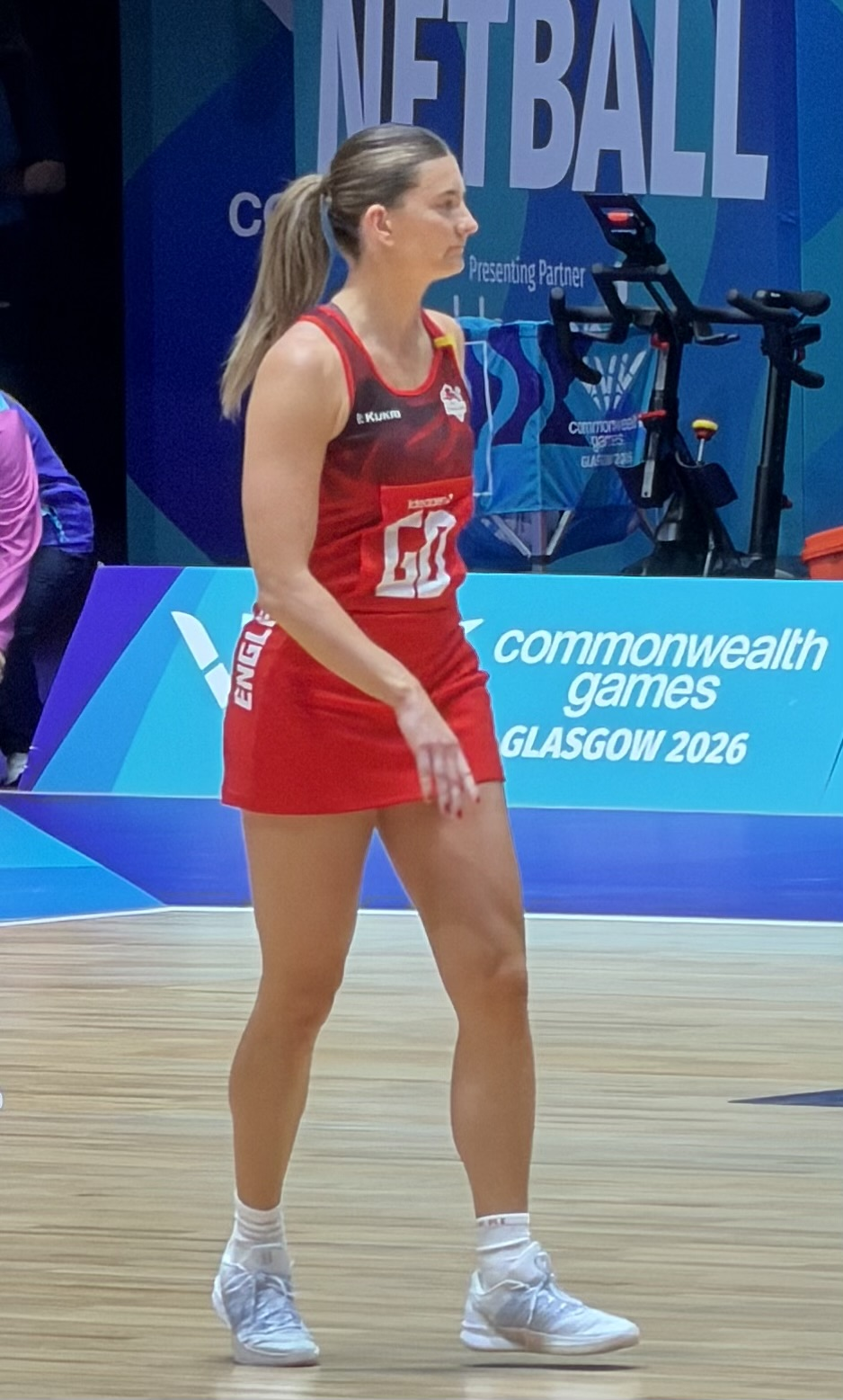
- Williams at the 2026 Commonwealth Games

Personal information
- Full name: Francesca Williams
- Born: 23 December 1997 (age 28) Richmond, London, England
- Height: 184 cm (6 ft 1/2 in)
- Relatives: Jack Williams, Imogen Williams
- School: Kendrick School; Reading Blue Coat School
- University: University of Birmingham

Netball career
- Playing positions: GD, WD, GK
Years	Club team	Apps
2016	Surrey Storm	
2017–2021	Wasps Netball	
2022–2023	Loughborough Lightning	
2024-	West Coast Fever	
Years	National team	Caps
2018–	England	43
Medal record
Representing England
Netball World Cup
Silver medal – second place	2023 Cape Town	Netball
Bronze medal – third place	2019 Liverpool	Netball
- Updated on May 2025

Francesca 'Fran' Williams (born 23 December 1997) is an English international netballer who currently plays for West Coast Fever in Suncorp Super Netball. With the England Roses she has won a silver and bronze medal at the Netball World Cup and she has four Netball Super League titles with Wasps Netball and Loughborough Lightning.

== Early life and education ==
Williams started playing netball in her last year of primary school before joining Woodley Netball Club in Reading, Berkshire. She attended Kendrick School and later Reading Blue Coat School for sixth form. Williams has a degree in Economics from the University of Birmingham.

== Club career ==
=== Surrey Storm ===
Williams started her career as part of the Surrey Storm pathway.

=== Wasps Netball ===
She moved to Wasps Netball in 2017, and won the 2017 Super League Grand Final in her first year. She went on to make the Super League grand final in the following 2 seasons, winning a second title in 2018 and losing to Manchester Thunder in 2019.

=== Loughborough Lightning ===
Williams moved to Loughborough Lightning ahead of the 2022 season. She had a standout year with Lightning in 2023, winning her third Super League title and voted Fan's Player of the Season. Williams won a fourth Super League title the following season in 2024.

=== West Coast Fever ===
Williams signed for the West Coast Fever for the 2024 Suncorp Super Netball season.

== International career ==
Williams came through the England Netball pathway and was captain of the England under-21 team. She made her senior debut for the England Roses in November 2018 against Uganda. Williams made an instant impression in the national side and was later selected in England's 12-woman squad for the January 2019 Quad Series and the 2019 Netball World Cup, where the team finished third.

She was not selected for the 2022 Commonwealth Games but returned to the side in 2023 as part of the England Roses team who achieved their first ever World Cup Silver Medal in Cape Town. In the semi-final against New Zealand, Williams secured the vital intercept that helped the Roses through to their first ever World Cup Final. Later that year she was appointed Captain for a test series against South Africa.

Williams captained the England side when they won the 2024 Taini Jamison Trophy Series and 2025 Netball Nations Cup as well as silver at the 2024 Netball Nations Cup. In June 2026 Wiilliams was selected into the 2026 Commonwealth Games team and named as captain.

== Personal life ==
Before moving to Australia she served as Player Chair for England's Netball Players Association (NPA) and is an advocate for NetballHer, an England netball campaign advocating for women's health issues.

== Honours ==
=== England ===
- Netball World Cup: Silver: 2023 Bronze: 2019
- Taini Jamison Trophy: 2024
- Netball Nations Cup: 2025 Silver: 2024

=== Wasps Netball ===
- Netball Super League: 2017, 2018 Runner up: 2019

=== Loughborough Lightning ===
- Netball Super League: 2023, 2024
