= 2017 in England =

- Centuries: 19th; 20th; 21st
- Decades: 1990s; 2000s; 2010s; 2020s
- See also: 2016–17 in English football 2017–18 in English football 2017 in the United Kingdom; Other events of 2017

Events from 2017 in England

== Incumbent ==
- Monarch - Elizabeth II
- Prime Minister - Theresa May

== Events ==
- 1 January – Kingston upon Hull begins its City of Culture programme with a 10-minute fireworks display over the Marina.
- 2 January
  - The government announces proposals to build seventeen new towns and villages across the English countryside.
  - Yassar Yaqub is killed in a police shooting during an operation on the M62 near Huddersfield.
- 9 January – Seven year old Katie Rough is fatally asphyxiated and stabbed in the neck near her home in Woodthorpe, York. A fifteen year old girl hands herself in to the police immediately after the killing.
- 14 March – Trans woman fell runner Lauren Jeska is sentenced to 18 years imprisonment for the attempted murder of UK Athletics official Ralph Knibbs. Jeska had feared her records and ability to compete in women's events would be investigated due to the unfair advantage she had from being born male.
- 22 March – Westminster terror attack - Khalid Masood drove a car into pedestrians on Westminster Bridge and then fatally stabbed a police officer outside the Palace of Westminster before being shot dead by police. Five people were killed and more than 50 injured.
- 22 May – Manchester Arena bombing - Suicide bomber Salman Abedi detonated a homemade explosive device at the end of an Ariana Grande concert, killing 22 people and injuring more than 200.
- 3 June – Reynhard Sinaga, an Indonesian student living in Manchester is arrested on one count of rape. Later investigations reveal him to be the most prolific rapist in British legal history, having drug-raped up to 200 men.
- London Bridge terror attack - Three terrorists drove a van into pedestrians on London Bridge before stabbing people in Borough Market. Eight people were killed before the attackers were shot dead by police.
- 14 June – Grenfell Tower fire
- 5 July – Robert Trigg was convicted of the manslaughter of Caroline Devlin and the murder of Susan Nicholson.
- 24 November – A sixteen-year-old girl who admitted the manslaughter seven year old Katie Rough in York is detained for life and ordered to serve a minimum term of five years.

== Deaths ==
- January 12:
  - Anthony King, 82, professor and political scientist.
  - Graham Taylor, 72, football manager (Watford, Aston Villa, England).
- January 18:
  - John Hurt, 77, actor (The Elephant Man, Alien).
- January 20:
  - Mary Tyler Moore, 80, actress and television icon.
- January 22:
  - John McCririck, 79, horse racing pundit and television personality.
- February 3:
  - John McGuinness, 87, politician and member of the House of Lords.
- February 20:
  - Bill Paxton, 61, actor (Twister, Aliens).
- March 20:
  - Sir Bruce Forsyth, 89, television presenter and entertainer.
- April 21:
  - Prince Philip, Duke of Edinburgh, 99, husband of Queen Elizabeth II.
- May 22:
  - Chris Cornell, 52, musician (Soundgarden, Audioslave).
- June 2
  - Peter Sallis, 96, actor and voice actor (Last of the Summer Wine, Wallace and Gromit, The Wind in the Willows).
- June 14:
  - Charlie Murphy, 57, actor and comedian.
- June 30:
  - David Kelly, 82, scientist and author.
- July 14:
  - David Warner, 80, actor (Titanic, The Omen).
- August 16:
  - Jerry Lewis, 91, comedian, actor, and filmmaker.
- September 8:
  - John McCain, 81, U.S. senator and war hero.
- October 17:
  - Tom Petty, 66, musician (Tom Petty and the Heartbreakers).
- November 12:
  - Stan Lee, 95, comic book writer and publisher, co-creator of Spider-Man and the X-Men.
- December 26:
  - Richard Adams, 96, author (Watership Down).

== See also ==
- 2017 in Northern Ireland
- 2017 in Scotland
- 2017 in Wales
