= Chloe Essam =

English netball player

Personal information
- Born: 9 December 1999 (age 26)
- University: University of Hertfordshire

Netball career
- Playing positions: GA, GS
Years	Club team	Apps
2017–2018	Loughborough Lightning	
2018–2020	Saracens Mavericks	
2020-2022	Wasps Netball	
2022-2023	Severn Stars	
2023-present	London Pulse	
- (Correct as of 13 Feb 2024)

Chloe Essam (born 9 December 1999) is an English netball player. She plays for Wasps Netball in the Netball Superleague at both goal attack and goal shooter.

Essam was raised in Kettering and was educated at Southfield School. She played for the MK Netters in Milton Keynes as a junior, was selected for the England Roses U19 National Academy in November 2015, and played with the English national under-17 side, which won the European championship in 2016. She represented Loughborough in the youth National Performance League competition in 2015–2016.

She was drafted by the Loughborough Superleague team in November 2016 for the 2017 season, debuting in February 2017 and becoming one of the youngest players to feature in the league at age 17. She was part of the Lightning team that won the national Fast5 competition in September 2017, and was re-signed for the 2018 season in December 2017. In the 2018 season, Essam played in 10 games, with a 50% goal percentage. Essam's move to Wasps Netball was announced ahead of the 2019 Superleague season.
