= Sigrid Burger =

South African netball player (born 1996)

Personal information
- Born: 23 February 1996 (age 30) Somerset West, South Africa
- Occupation: netball player
- Height: 1.9 m (6 ft 3 in)

Netball career
- Playing positions: goal shooter, goal attack
Years	National team	Caps
2016-present	South Africa	29
Medal record
Representing South Africa
Women's netball
World University Netball Championship
Gold medal – first place	2016 Miami	team
African Netball Championships
Gold medal – first place	2019 Cape Town	team

Sigrid Burger also simply known as Sigi Burger (born 23 February 1996) is a South African netball player who plays in the positions of goal shooter. UK She was also part of the South African squad which finished at fourth position at the 2019 Netball World Cup.

== Career ==
Sigrid made her international debut for South Africa against Wales at the 2016 Wales- South Africa test series. She also played for the South African university netball team at the 2016 World University Netball Championship where South Africa eventually went onto become the champions. She also represented South Africa at the 2018 Commonwealth Games.

She was signed up by Surrey Storm club in 2018 and played for the club at the 2018 Netball Superleague season. She also received NWU Sportswoman of the Year 2018 for her performances at both domestic and international level.

She was not initially included in the South African squad for the 2019 Netball World Cup. But she was later added to the squad as an injury replacement to Ine-Mari Venter during the back end of the tournament.

She was also a key member of the South African squad which won the 2019 African Netball Championships which was held in Cape Town.

She switched to play for London Pulse club for the upcoming 2020 Netball Superleague season after featuring for the Surrey Storm club nearly for two years in the Netball Superleague.
