= 2020 Netball Superleague season =

- League: Netball Superleague
- Sport: Netball
- Teams: 10

2020 Netball Superleague season
- Champions: None

Seasons
- ← 2019 2021 →

The 2020 Netball Superleague season was the fifteenth season of the Netball Superleague, the elite domestic netball competition in the United Kingdom. The season commenced on 22 February 2020. Manchester Thunder were the defending champions. In the midst of the fourth round of matches, the league announced the postponement of all future matches until at least 30 April 2020, as a result of the COVID-19 pandemic. On 27 May 2020, the season was cancelled, with the fixtures declared null and void.

== Overview ==
=== Teams ===
Team	Base
Celtic Dragons	Cardiff, Wales
London Pulse	Stratford, Greater London
Loughborough Lightning	Loughborough, Leicestershire
Manchester Thunder	Manchester, Greater Manchester
Saracens Mavericks	Hatfield, Hertfordshire
Severn Stars	Worcester, Worcestershire
Strathclyde Sirens	Glasgow, Scotland
Surrey Storm	Guildford, Surrey
Team Bath	Bath, Somerset
Wasps Netball	Coventry, West Midlands

=== Format ===
The length of the regular season was originally expanded by one week to include 19 rounds, with the additional round counting towards each club's total points. The top four would have progressed to the playoffs and eventually two teams met in the Grand Final.

== Fixtures ==
=== Round 1 ===
Sat 22 Feb	Strathclyde Sirens	51–53	London Pulse	Arena Birmingham
11.00am		Report

Sat 22 Feb	Celtic Dragons	43–44	Surrey Storm	Arena Birmingham
12.40pm		Report

Sat 22 Feb	Saracens Mavericks	70–49	Severn Stars	Arena Birmingham
2.30pm		Report

Sat 22 Feb	Team Bath	72–58	Loughborough Lightning	Arena Birmingham
3.45pm		Report

Sat 22 Feb	Manchester Thunder	62–55	Wasps Netball	Arena Birmingham
6.00pm		Report

=== Round 2 ===
Sat 29 Feb	Severn Stars	56–65	Manchester Thunder	Worcester Arena
2.00pm		Report

Sat 29 Feb	Loughborough Lightning	59–53	Strathclyde Sirens	Sir David Wallace Arena
4.00pm		Report

Sat 29 Feb	Celtic Dragons	52–71	Team Bath	Cardiff Met University
6.00pm		Report

Mon 2 Mar	Surrey Storm	50–51	London Pulse	Surrey Sports Park
7.00pm		Report

Mon 2 Mar	Wasps Netball	57–53	Saracens Mavericks	Ricoh Arena
7.00pm		Report

=== Round 3 ===
Fri 6 Mar	Strathclyde Sirens	61–53	Surrey Storm	Emirates Arena
7.00pm		Report

Fri 6 Mar	Team Bath	63–51	Wasps Netball	Team Bath Arena
7.00pm		Report

Sat 7 Mar	Saracens Mavericks	61–45	Severn Stars	Hertfordshire Sports Village
4.00pm		Report

Sat 7 Mar	Manchester Thunder	67–64	Loughborough Lightning	Belle Vue
6.00pm		Report

Mon 9 Mar	London Pulse	69–38	Celtic Dragons	Copper Box Arena
7.00pm		Report

=== Round 4 ===
Sat 14 Mar	Severn Stars	59–54	Wasps Netball	Worcester Arena
4.00pm		Report

Sat 14 Mar	Surrey Storm	42–60	Manchester Thunder	Surrey Sports Park
6.00pm		Report

None	Loughborough Lightning	Cancelled	Saracens Mavericks	Sir David Wallace Arena

None	Celtic Dragons	Cancelled	Strathclyde Sirens	Sport Wales National Centre

None	Team Bath	Cancelled	London Pulse	Team Bath Arena

== Table ==
2020 Netball Superleague table
Pos	Team	Pld	W	L	GF	GA	GD	Pts
1	Manchester Thunder	4	4	0	254	217	+37	12
2	Team Bath	3	3	0	206	161	+45	9
3	London Pulse	3	3	0	173	139	+34	9
4	Saracens Mavericks	3	2	1	184	151	+33	6
5	Strathclyde Sirens	3	1	2	165	165	0	3
6	Loughborough Lightning	3	1	2	181	192	−11	3
7	Wasps Netball	4	1	3	217	237	−20	3
8	Surrey Storm	4	1	3	189	215	−26	3
9	Severn Stars	4	1	3	209	250	−41	3
10	Celtic Dragons	3	0	3	133	184	−51	0
