= Josie Janz-Dawson =

Australian netball player

Personal information
- Full name: (Née: Josie Janz)
- Born: 24 February 1988 (age 38) Thursday Island, Torres Strait Islands, Australia
- Occupation: Netball
- Height: 1.85 m (6 ft 1 in)
- Spouse: Cormac Dawson (m. 2014)
- School: PLC

Netball career
- Playing positions: GD, GK
Years	Club team	Apps
2006–2007	AIS Canberra Darters	
2008–2016	West Coast Fever	
2017	Severn Stars	
2018	Team Bath	
- Updated on 2017-12-02

Josie Janz-Dawson (born 24 February 1988) is an Australian netball player in the Netball Superleague who will play for Team Bath in 2018. She works at the David Wirrpanda Foundation in the Dare to Dream program as the project officer. Janz-Dawson began working at the foundation as a mentor for young Indigenous children.

Janz-Dawson was born in Thursday Island. And was raised in a small town in the Kimberley known as Derby. Janz-Dawson played for the Australian under 21s in Jamaica in 2009.
