= 2021 Netball Superleague season =

British netball season

- League: Netball Superleague
- Sport: Netball
- Teams: 11

2021 Netball Superleague season
- Season champions: Loughborough Lightning
- Runners-up: Team Bath
- Season MVP: Beth Cobden
- Top scorer: Mary Cholhok Nuba

Seasons
- ← 2020 2022 →

The 2021 Netball Superleague season was the sixteenth season of the Netball Superleague, the elite domestic netball competition in the United Kingdom. The season started on 12 February 2021. Manchester Thunder were the defending champions, as they won the 2019 season and the 2020 season was cancelled after three rounds due to the COVID-19 pandemic. Because of the ongoing pandemic, the first nine weeks of matches were held at Studio 001 in Wakefield, and the remaining matches were held at the Copper Box Arena in London. All matches were originally scheduled to be held behind closed doors, though from week 17 onwards, limited numbers of fans were permitted into matches, due to a change in the UK Government guidelines.

In the league section, Loughborough Lightning finished top, ahead of Manchester Thunder, Team Bath and Leeds Rhinos, who finished second, third and fourth respectively. The top three teams finished on the same number of points, and were separated by goal difference. Rhinos had their last two matches cancelled, as the squad had to isolate after one player tested positive for COVID-19. They were awarded the points and therefore qualified for the playoffs. In the semi-finals, Loughborough Lightning beat Leeds Rhinos and Team Bath beat Manchester Thunder. Lightning beat Bath in the final to win the competition.

== Overview ==
=== Format ===
The 2021 Netball Superleague season consisted of 11 teams; Leeds Rhinos joined the league for the first time. The 2021 season used 12-minute quarters for player welfare reasons, reduced from the 15-minute quarters played in previous seasons. League-stage matches could end in a draw; previously, extra time was used to determine a winner. On each match day a team could use a squad of 12 players.

The fixture list consisted of 20 rounds, running from 12 February to 21 June. The semifinals were held on 26 June, and the grand final was on 27 June. Due to the COVID-19 pandemic, all matches were expected to be held behind closed doors. All players had to take COVID-19 tests twice a week. The first nine weeks of matches were held at Studio 001 in Wakefield, and the remaining matches were held at the Copper Box Arena in London. All matches were broadcast on Sky Sports (either on television or via YouTube), and start times were scheduled two hours apart so that they could all be televised. In May 2021, it was announced that for rounds 17 to 20 of matches, 1,000 fans would be permitted into matches, due to a change in the UK Government guidelines. The same number of fans were permitted for the play-off matches.

=== Teams ===
Team	Base
Celtic Dragons	Cardiff, Wales
Leeds Rhinos	Leeds, West Yorkshire
London Pulse	Stratford, Greater London
Loughborough Lightning	Loughborough, Leicestershire
Manchester Thunder	Manchester, Greater Manchester
Saracens Mavericks	Hatfield, Hertfordshire
Severn Stars	Worcester, Worcestershire
Strathclyde Sirens	Glasgow, Scotland
Surrey Storm	Guildford, Surrey
Team Bath	Bath, Somerset
Wasps	Coventry, West Midlands

=== Squads ===
Each team was allowed to have 10 players, 9 of whom were covered by the sport's salary cap. Teams could also register an additional five training players. Squads were only allowed 2 non-EU players, and these players were not allowed to play in the same third of the court simultaneously. The player signing window ran from 17 August to 30 October 2020.

During the player signing window, Australians Madi Browne and Donnell Wallam signed for Leeds Rhinos, South African Lefébre Rademan signed for London Pulse, and South African Ine-Marí Venter signed for Saracens Mavericks. Jamaican Malysha Kelly signed for Severn Stars, Jamaican Gezelle Allison signed for Wasps, and Zimbabwe captain Felisitus Kwangwa signed for Surrey Storm. At the domestic level, Leeds Rhinos signed English players Jade Clarke from Wasps and Vicki Oyesola from Loughborough Lightning. Beth Cobden signed for Loughborough Lightning. Prior to the season, Manchester Thunder suspended one player for breaching COVID-19 restrictions on New Year's Eve 2020.

== Table ==
2021 Netball Superleague table
Pos	Team	Pld	W	D	L	GF	GA	GD	Pts	Qualification
1	Loughborough Lightning (Q)	20	17	0	3	1084	803	+281	51	Qualified for the Finals series
2	Manchester Thunder (Q)	20	17	0	3	1096	831	+265	51	Qualified for the Finals series
3	Team Bath (Q)	20	17	0	3	950	747	+203	51	Qualified for the Finals series
4	Leeds Rhinos (Q)	20	12	0	8	884	856	+28	36	Qualified for the Finals series
5	Saracens Mavericks	20	11	1	8	882	862	+20	34	
6	Strathclyde Sirens	20	10	2	8	824	844	−20	32	
7	Wasps	20	10	1	9	884	804	+80	31	
8	London Pulse	20	6	0	14	734	793	−59	18	
9	Severn Stars	20	4	0	16	738	958	−220	12	
10	Surrey Storm	20	3	0	17	775	970	−195	9	
11	Celtic Dragons	20	1	0	19	675	1058	−383	3	

(Q) Qualify for the 2021 Netball Superleague Play-offs.

== League stage ==
=== Rounds 1 & 2 ===
12 February	Celtic Dragons	35–65	Leeds Rhinos	Studio 001
17:15

12 February	Strathclyde Sirens	36–53	Manchester Thunder	Studio 001
19:15

13 February	London Pulse	40–42	Surrey Storm	Studio 001
14:00

13 February	Team Bath	61–29	Celtic Dragons	Studio 001
16:00

13 February	Strathclyde Sirens	36–30	Severn Stars	Studio 001
18:00

14 February	Team Bath	48–44	Loughborough Lightning	Studio 001
14:00

14 February	Surrey Storm	41–53	Saracens Mavericks	Studio 001
16:00

14 February	Severn Stars	34–53	Wasps	Studio 001
18:00

15 February	Loughborough Lightning	44–43	Wasps	Studio 001
17:15

15 February	Leeds Rhinos	39–43	Saracens Mavericks	Studio 001
19:15

=== Round 3 ===
21 February	Surrey Storm	44–50	Leeds Rhinos	Studio 001
12:00

21 February	Celtic Dragons	35–52	Strathclyde Sirens	Studio 001
16:00

21 February	Manchester Thunder	57–30	London Pulse	Studio 001
18:00

21 February	Loughborough Lightning	60–35	Saracens Mavericks	Studio 001
20:00

22 February	Celtic Dragons	40–56	Surrey Storm	Studio 001
17:15

22 February	Wasps	39–44	Team Bath	Studio 001
19:15

=== Round 4 ===
28 February	Severn Stars	27–60	Manchester Thunder	Studio 001
12:00

28 February	Strathclyde Sirens	35–30	London Pulse	Studio 001
14:00

28 February	Wasps	46–33	Surrey Storm	Studio 001
16:00

28 February	Leeds Rhinos	41–70	Loughborough Lightning	Studio 001
18:00

1 March	Celtic Dragons	41–61	Saracens Mavericks	Studio 001
17:15

1 March	Loughborough Lightning	58–30	Severn Stars	Studio 001
19:15

=== Round 5 & 6 ===
12 March	Severn Stars	49–46	Surrey Storm	Studio 001
17:15

12 March	Team Bath	60–35	Manchester Thunder	Studio 001
19:15

13 March	Surrey Storm	37–56	Loughborough Lightning	Studio 001
14:00

13 March	Team Bath	49–30	Severn Stars	Studio 001
16:00

13 March	Manchester Thunder	44–53	Wasps	Studio 001
18:00

14 March	Strathclyde Sirens	34–34	Saracens Mavericks	Studio 001
14:00

14 March	Loughborough Lightning	52–40	London Pulse	Studio 001
16:00

14 March	Wasps	53–41	Leeds Rhinos	Studio 001
18:00

15 March	London Pulse	56–29	Celtic Dragons	Studio 001
17:15

15 March	Leeds Rhinos	43–39	Strathclyde Sirens	Studio 001
19:15

=== Round 7 ===
21 March	Manchester Thunder	69–33	Celtic Dragons	Studio 001
12:00

21 March	Saracens Mavericks	39–32	London Pulse	Studio 001
14:00

21 March	Surrey Storm	30–50	Team Bath	Studio 001
16:00

21 March	Strathclyde Sirens	32–32	Wasps	Studio 001
20:00

22 March	Team Bath	47–36	Strathclyde Sirens	Studio 001
17:15

22 March	Leeds Rhinos	42–38	Severn Stars	Studio 001
19:15

=== Round 8 ===
28 March	Manchester Thunder	48–41	Leeds Rhinos	Studio 001
12:00

28 March	London Pulse	29–51	Team Bath	Studio 001
14:00

28 March	Loughborough Lightning	43–38	Strathclyde Sirens	Studio 001
16:00

28 March	Wasps	52–38	Celtic Dragons	Studio 001
20:00

29 March	Saracens Mavericks	53–36	Severn Stars	Studio 001
17:15

29 March	London Pulse	38–40	Leeds Rhinos	Studio 001
19:15

=== Round 9 ===
4 April	Manchester Thunder	59–50	Loughborough Lightning	Studio 001
12:00

4 April	Severn Stars	33–27	Celtic Dragons	Studio 001
14:00

4 April	London Pulse	37–49	Wasps	Studio 001
16:00

4 April	Saracens Mavericks	39–38	Team Bath	Studio 001
18:00

5 April	Severn Stars	36–41	London Pulse	Studio 001
17:15

5 April	Saracens Mavericks	37–59	Manchester Thunder	Studio 001
19:15

=== Round 10 & 11 ===
9 April	Strathclyde Sirens	35–61	Loughborough Lightning	Studio 001
17:15

9 April	Leeds Rhinos	46–52	Team Bath	Studio 001
19:15

10 April	Surrey Storm	33–45	Strathclyde Sirens	Studio 001
14:00

10 April	Team Bath	37–27	London Pulse	Studio 001
16:00

10 April	Celtic Dragons	23–76	Loughborough Lightning	Studio 001
18:00

11 April	Surrey Storm	35–52	Manchester Thunder	Studio 001
14:00

11 April	Celtic Dragons	38–52	Wasps	Studio 001
16:00

11 April	Severn Stars	34–54	Saracens Mavericks	Studio 001
18:00

12 April	Wasps	38–34	Saracens Mavericks	Studio 001
17:15

12 April	Leeds Rhinos	47–66	Manchester Thunder	Studio 001
19:15

=== Round 12 ===
25 April	Celtic Dragons	34–51	Team Bath	Copper Box Arena
12:00

25 April	Severn Stars	37–45	Strathclyde Sirens	Copper Box Arena
14:00

25 April	Saracens Mavericks	48–63	Leeds Rhinos	Copper Box Arena
16:00

25 April	Wasps	42–52	Loughborough Lightning	Copper Box Arena
18:00

26 April	Wasps	53–27	Severn Stars	Copper Box Arena
17:15

26 April	Surrey Storm	41–43	London Pulse	Copper Box Arena
19:15

=== Rounds 13 & 14 ===
30 April	Surrey Storm	39–48	Celtic Dragons	Copper Box Arena
17:15

30 April	Saracens Mavericks	47–55	Loughborough Lightning	Copper Box Arena
19:15

1 May	Surrey Storm	39–46	Severn Stars	Copper Box Arena
14:00

1 May	London Pulse	38–48	Strathclyde Sirens	Copper Box Arena
16:00

1 May	Saracens Mavericks	59–39	Celtic Dragons	Copper Box Arena
18:00

2 May	Strathclyde Sirens	51–69	Leeds Rhinos	Copper Box Arena
14:00

2 May	London Pulse	42–50	Manchester Thunder	Copper Box Arena
16:00

2 May	Team Bath	41–37	Wasps	Copper Box Arena
18:00

3 May	Manchester Thunder	41–44	Team Bath	Copper Box Arena
17:15

3 May	Leeds Rhinos	51–41	Wasps	Copper Box Arena
19:15

=== Round 15 ===
9 May	Severn Stars	41–50	Loughborough Lightning	Copper Box Arena
12:00

9 May	Team Bath	59–43	Leeds Rhinos	Copper Box Arena
14:00

9 May	Strathclyde Sirens	52–39	Surrey Storm	Copper Box Arena
16:00

9 May	Celtic Dragons	40–54	Manchester Thunder	Copper Box Arena
18:00

10 May	Loughborough Lightning	53–28	Surrey Storm	Copper Box Arena
17:15

10 May	Wasps	42–37	London Pulse	Copper Box Arena
19:15

=== Round 16 ===
16 May	Severn Stars	36–63	Leeds Rhinos	Copper Box Arena
12:00

16 May	Team Bath	55–39	Surrey Storm	Copper Box Arena
14:00

16 May	Wasps	39–44	Strathclyde Sirens	Copper Box Arena
16:00

16 May	Manchester Thunder	60–42	Saracens Mavericks	Copper Box Arena
18:00

17 May	Wasps	47–53	Manchester Thunder	Copper Box Arena
17:15

17 May	London Pulse	35–42	Loughborough Lightning	Copper Box Arena
19:15

=== Rounds 17 & 18 ===
From Round 17 onwards, matches were held with a limited number of spectators.

28 May	Celtic Dragons	30–51	London Pulse	Copper Box Arena
17:15

28 May	Severn Stars	32–45	Team Bath	Copper Box Arena
19:15

29 May	Loughborough Lightning	59–35	Celtic Dragons	Copper Box Arena
14:00

29 May	Manchester Thunder	54–43	Severn Stars	Copper Box Arena
16:00

29 May	Strathclyde Sirens	37–48	Team Bath	Copper Box Arena
18:00

30 May	Loughborough Lightning	59–51	Leeds Rhinos	Copper Box Arena
14:00

30 May	Saracens Mavericks	35–41	Strathclyde Sirens	Copper Box Arena
16:00

30 May	Manchester Thunder	57–41	Surrey Storm	Copper Box Arena
18:00

31 May	Leeds Rhinos	49–39	Surrey Storm	Copper Box Arena
17:15

31 May	Saracens Mavericks	41–37	Wasps	Copper Box Arena
19:15

=== Round 19 ===
The match between Surrey Storm and Wasps was postponed due to one Wasps player testing positive for COVID-19. The match was rearranged for 21 June after all COVID tests came back negative.

13 June	Strathclyde Sirens	53–34	Celtic Dragons	Copper Box Arena
14:00

13 June	Team Bath	35–46	Saracens Mavericks	Copper Box Arena
16:00

13 June	London Pulse	42–40	Severn Stars	Copper Box Arena
18:00

14 June	London Pulse	46–33	Saracens Mavericks	Copper Box Arena
17:15

14 June	Loughborough Lightning	46–60	Manchester Thunder	Copper Box Arena
19:15

21 June (Note: Postponed from 13 June due to a positive COVID-19 test.)	Surrey Storm	39–35	Wasps	Copper Box Arena
17:15

=== Round 20 ===
Leeds Rhinos had their last two matches against London Pulse and Celtic Dragons cancelled, as their squad had to isolate after one of their squad tested positive for COVID-19. As Rhinos had beaten Pulse and Dragons earlier in the season, they were awarded the points for both matches, and qualified for the play-offs as a result.

20 June	Saracens Mavericks	48–35	Surrey Storm	Copper Box Arena
12:00

20 June	Manchester Thunder	64–37	Strathclyde Sirens	Copper Box Arena
14:00

20 June	Celtic Dragons	39–45	Severn Stars	Copper Box Arena
16:00

20 June	Leeds Rhinos	Cancelled	London Pulse	Copper Box Arena
18:00

21 June	Leeds Rhinos	Cancelled	Celtic Dragons	Copper Box Arena
17:15

21 June	Loughborough Lightning	54–35	Team Bath	Copper Box Arena
19:15

== Finals series ==
In the finals series, the team finishing first in the league section played the team finishing fourth, and the team that finished second played the third-placed team. The top three teams finished the league section on the same number of points, and were separated by goal difference.

Source for fixtures:

=== Semi-finals ===
26 June; 14:00	Loughborough Lightning	58–38	Leeds Rhinos	Copper Box Arena	Sky Sports

26 June; 16:00	Manchester Thunder	38–41	Team Bath	Copper Box Arena	Sky Sports

=== Grand Final ===
Loughborough Lightning had previously played in three Grand Finals, whilst Team Bath had not appeared in a Grand Final since 2013. Lightning took the lead in the first quarter, and were 11–7 up after one quarter. They maintained the lead, and by the end of the third quarter, they were ahead 31–24. Lightning won the grand final for the first time.

27 June; 17:30	Report; Stats	Loughborough Lightning	49–32	Team Bath	Copper Box Arena	Sky Sports
27 June; 17:30	Report; Stats	Scoring by quarter: 11–7, 11–7, 9–10, 18–8			Copper Box Arena	Sky Sports
27 June; 17:30	Report; Stats	Cholhok 38/41 (93%); Clark 11/13 (85%)		Borger 22/24 (92%); Drakeford-Lewis 4/5 (80%)	Copper Box Arena	Sky Sports
