= Jade Clarke =

English netball player (born 1983)

Jade Clarke MBE
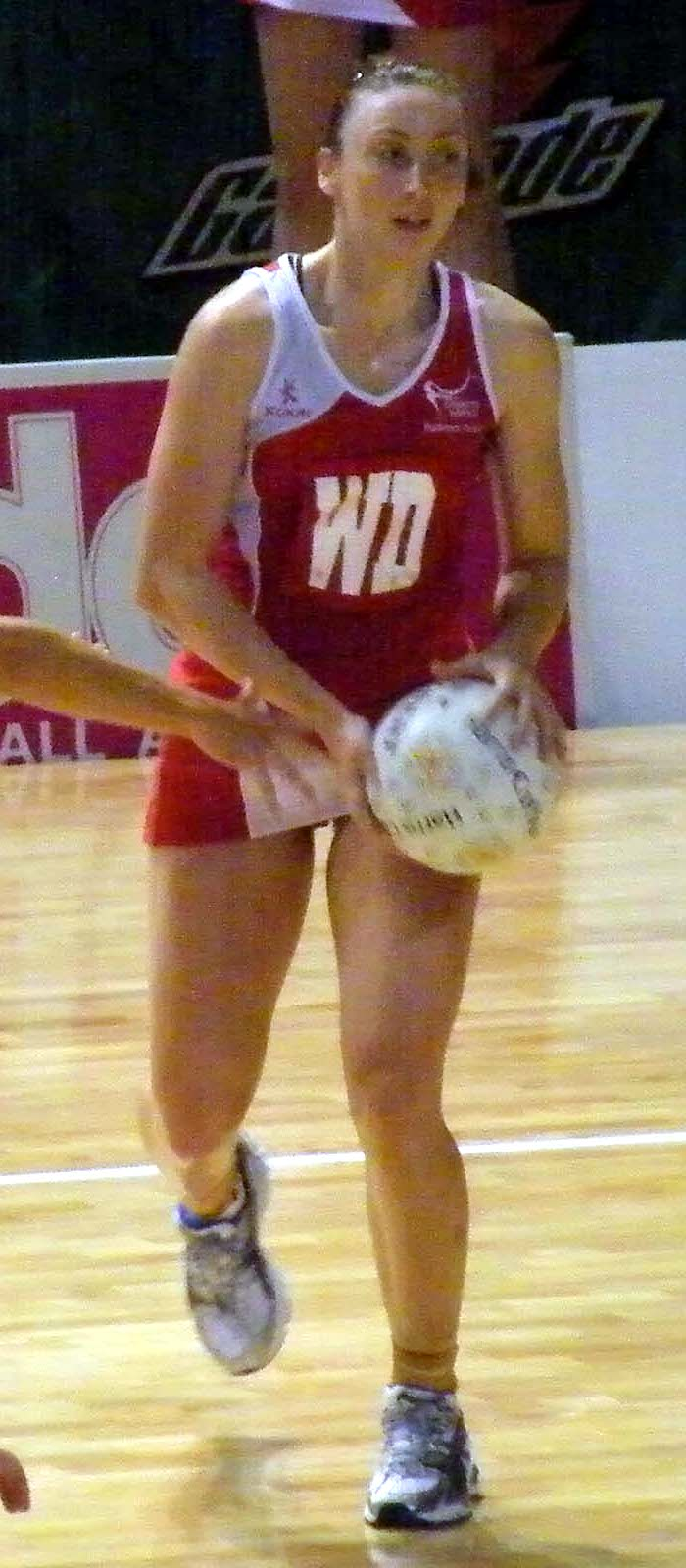
- Jade Clarke in 2008

Personal information
- Full name: Jade Bridget Clarke
- Born: 17 October 1983 (age 43) Manchester, England
- Height: 1.74 m (5 ft 8 1/2 in)
- Relative: Ashley Hall (née Clarke)

Netball career
- Playing positions: WD, C, WA
Years	Club team	Apps
2005–2009, 2016	Loughborough Lightning	
2009	Northern Thunder	
2010	Waikato Bay of Plenty Magic	
2012	Northern Mystics	
2013–2014	Canterbury Tactix	
2015	New South Wales Swifts	
2016–2017	Adelaide Thunderbirds	
2018–2020	Wasps Netball	
2020–2022	Leeds Rhinos Netball	
2023	London Pulse	
Years	National team	Caps
2002–2023	England	214
Medal record
Representing England
Commonwealth Games
Gold medal – first place	2018 Gold Coast	Netball
Bronze medal – third place	2006 Melbourne	Netball
Bronze medal – third place	2010 Delhi	Netball
- Updated on 18 May 2023

Jade Bridget Clarke MBE (born 17 October 1983 in Manchester, England) is an English netball player. Primarily a midcourt defender, Clarke was selected for the England national netball team in 2002, making her senior debut the following year against New Zealand. During her international career, she has competed at six Netball World Cups/Championships (2003, 2007, 2011, 2015, 2019 and 2023), four Commonwealth Games (2006, 2010, 2014 and 2018), and the 2009 and 2011 World Netball Series.

She is England's most-capped player and the most-capped player for a single country.

== Club career ==
Clarke started her club netball in the Netball Superleague. She played four seasons with Loughborough Lightning before switching to the Northern Thunder for 2009–10. In 2010, Clarke was signed to play in the Australasian ANZ Championship with New Zealand–based team the Waikato Bay of Plenty Magic, as a Temporary Replacement Player for injured midcourter Peta Scholz.

In 2012, she signed on to play for the NZ Franchise, Northern Mystics for the ANZ Championships. She signed with the Canterbury Tactix for the 2013 season. After 2 seasons with the Canterbury Tactix Clarke signed with the Sydney-based NSW Swifts signing as their import player.

In September 2015, it was confirmed that she had re-signed for Loughborough Lightning. On 20 February 2016, it was announced she would be returning to Australia to play for Adelaide Thunderbirds. She stayed in Australia until 2018, when she returned to England to play for Wasps Netball.

In 2020, Clarke was announced as the first player of the newly formed Leeds Rhinos. In 2023, she joined London Pulse.

== International career ==
She made her debut in 2003 in her home city of Manchester against New Zealand.

In 2011, she was named as the captain of England, after the retirement of Karen Atkinson after the 2011 Netball World Championships. She captained them to a first ever gold medal in the 2011 World Netball Series.

On 21 September 2014, Clarke was inducted into the England Netball Hall of Fame.

Clarke was a member of the gold medal winning England team at the 2018 Commonwealth Games. She was also selected in the 12-player squad for the Roses at the 2019 Netball World Cup.

On the 25 January 2023, Clarke became only the second netballer to reach 200 international caps. Clarke was appointed Member of the Order of the British Empire (MBE) in the 2023 New Year Honours for services to netball.

== Personal life ==
Jade Clarke was born in 1983 in Manchester and later studied Sports Science at Loughborough University.

== Honours ==
=== Individual ===
- Inducted into the England Netball Hall of Fame
- England Commonwealth Games Netball Team Captain: 2014
- Mainland Tactix Members' Player of the Year: 2014
- Tactix Player of the Year: 2013

=== England ===
- Commonwealth Games Gold medal: 2018
- Commonwealth Games Bronze Medal: 2006, 2010
- Netball World Cup Bronze Medal: 2011, 2015
- FastNet World Netball Series Gold Medal: 2011

=== Wasps ===
- Netball Superleague champions: 2018
