= 2017 Netball Superleague Grand Final =

Netball Superleague grand final

- Event: 2017 Netball Superleague season
Wasps	Loughborough Lightning
	.
55	51
- Wasps make their debut grand final appearance and win their first title in their inaugural Netball Superleague season. Lightning make their second grand final appearance.
- Date: 11 June 2017
- Venue: Barclaycard Arena, Birmingham
- Player of the Match: Bongiwe Msomi (Wasps)

The 2017 Netball Superleague Grand Final featured Wasps and Loughborough Lightning. Wasps won the Netball Superleague title in their debut season, beating Lightning 55–51 in the grand final. Wasps led by one goal at the start of the final quarter, having dominated Lightning in the mid-court. Wasps centre, Bongiwe Msomi, was subsequently named player of the match. Wasps attacking combination of Rachel Dunn and Natalie Haythornthwaite proved too strong for Lightning.

== Match summary ==
11 June 2017; 17:00	Wasps	55–51	Loughborough Lightning	Barclaycard Arena	Sky Sports
11 June 2017; 17:00	Scoring by quarter: 16–15, 27–26, 41–40, 55–51			Barclaycard Arena	Sky Sports
11 June 2017; 17:00	Rachel Dunn 43/47 (91%); Natalie Haythornthwaite 12/13 (92%)		Peace Proscovia 40/43 (93%); Vanessa Walker 11/16 (69%)	Barclaycard Arena	Sky Sports

== Teams ==
Head Coach: Tamsin Greenway Starting 7: GS Rachel Dunn; GA Natalie Haythornthwaite; WA Tamsin Greenway; C Bongiwe Msomi; WD Amy Flanagan; GD Hannah Reid (c); GK Josie Huckle Substitutes: WD Samantha May Squad: GS, GA George Fisher; C, GA, WA Lucy Harris; GA, GS Lucy Parize; GD, WD Fran Williams	Head Coach: Karen Atkinson Starting 7: GS Peace Proscovia; GA Vanessa Walker; WA Hannah Joseph; C Natalie Panagarry; WD Beth Cobden; GD Vicky Oyesola; GK Joanna Trip Squad: GA, GS Chloe Essam; GD, GK Ella Gibbons; C, GA, WD Rosie Harris; GS Olivia Mason; C, WD Caroline Tarnowski
