= Murder of Shana Grice =

2016 murder case in England

Shana Grice was a British teenager who was murdered by Michael Lane, her former friend, after he had stalked her. The murder led to criticism of Sussex Police for their failure to take Grice's complaints of stalking seriously.

== Relationship ==
Grice had met Michael Lane in 2015 when they had both worked at Brighton Fire Alarms. Lane was from Thornhill Rise, Portslade, near Brighton. They formed a relationship during the break between Grice and Ashley Cooke, her boyfriend since high school, then Lane had become obsessed with her. He refused to accept the breakup and said to a friend "She’ll pay for what she’s done."

== Stalking ==
Lane stalked Grice after she broke up with him and returned to Cooke. Lane put a tracker device on her car which notified him via his mobile phone every time her vehicle moved.

On 8 February 2016, Grice complained to police about being stalked by Lane after receiving unwanted flowers and damage to her car.

On 24 March 2016, Lane snatched her phone and grabbed her hair. He was arrested on suspicion of assault but later released and Grice was issued with a fixed penalty notice by the police for wasting their time by not disclosing she had been in a relationship with him.

On 9 July 2016, Lane used a stolen key to let himself into her home and watch her while she was apparently sleeping. She was actually awake, had heard his footsteps and hid under the duvet. She heard a man breathing in her room. Shortly afterwards, the man left, and when Grice looked out her window she saw Lane walking away. He was arrested for theft, given a police caution and told to stay away from Grice.

The following day, 10 July 2016, she received around seven phone calls from a blocked number, including one with heavy breathing. She was told there were no further lines of inquiry and the case would be left on file.

On 12 July 2016, she reported to police that she was being followed by Lane. Police treated the case as "low risk", but said that the investigating officer would be made aware.

On 4 August 2016, she saw Lane loitering outside her home. She confided in her friend, Joann Pumphrey, that she was afraid that police wouldn't believe her because of her previous fine for wasting police time. Although Joann was a witness to this, Grice didn't report the incident to the police.

== Murder ==
On 25 August 2016, Lane waited until Grice was alone at home, then let himself in, slit her throat and set fire to her bedroom with her in it. She was 19 years old at the time of her murder and her killer was 27 years old. Her body was found by Ian Cooke, her boyfriend's father, in her home at Chrisdory Road, Portslade, East Sussex.

Lane was arrested the same day, 25 August 2016, at his then-workplace in Burgess Hill. He initially lied to police about his movements that day, before admitting that he had gone to Grice’s home. He claimed that he had found the front door open, then found Grice’s body in her bedroom. He claimed that he panicked, then left the scene without dialing 999, checking Grice’s vital signs or telling his family what he had found. He claimed that he only kept quiet about what he had seen because he was afraid of being accused of her murder.

== Trial ==
The trial was held in 2017 at Lewes Crown Court and lasted two weeks. Lane admitted to stalking Grice but pleaded not guilty to murdering her. After being found guilty, Lane was sentenced to life imprisonment with a minimum term of 25 years.

== Aftermath ==
Grice's parents, Sharon Grice and Richard Green, said their daughter would still be alive if Sussex Police had acted on her complaints. The judge, Justice Green, also criticised police. During sentencing he said, "There was seemingly no appreciation on the part of those investigating that a young woman in a sexual relationship with a man could at one and the same time be vulnerable and at risk of serious harm. The police jumped to conclusions and Grice was stereotyped."

=== Previous complaints ===
Sussex police also revealed that Lane had been the subject of complaints of stalking and harassment from 13 other women. Most of the complaints related to the three years leading to Grice's murder, except for one which allegedly occurred within the preceding 10 years.

=== Domestic homicide review ===
A domestic homicide review report concluded that Lane had harassed 12 girls and young women between 2006 and 2016 and he had been arrested over claims he groomed a 14-year-old girl. He was not charged over the 2010 grooming allegation, which was marked on his arrest record, but it was not noted when Grice reported him for harassment. The allegation dates to when he was a volunteer scout leader. After his arrest he resigned from the Scouts. He was told the allegation would be considered if he tried to rejoin the organisation, but when he did so in 2015 he was not recognised as a past member and he volunteered for several months. The failure to recognise him was put down to a "temporary glitch in the IT system".

The report said that Lane had "used youth movements, which appealed to young women and girls, to allow him access to victims."

The report also mentioned an account of Lane being "very controlling" in another relationship, of him bombarding women with explicit messages, loitering outside their homes, pestering women to sleep with him for money, harassing two women he met in a pub and sexually assaulting another woman.

In August 2019 it was announced that Sussex Police would no longer fine people reporting domestic abuse for wasting police time.

=== Consequences for Sussex Police ===
Sussex Police apologised to Grice's parents and referred themselves to the Independent Police Complaints Commission (IPCC), which launched an inquiry.

==== IPCC recommendations ====
In late April 2017, Sussex Police accepted six recommendations from the IPCC to improve the way the force dealt with stalking. The recommendations concerned training, data systems and making use of relevant information. IPCC associate commissioner Tom Milsom said that Sussex Police had taken a positive response to the recommendations and he said that "Stalking and harassment are serious offences and in certain situations, such as those involving Grice, can have tragic consequences." Detective Superintendent Jason Tingley of Sussex Police said that additional training was already being provided and "We have improved our understanding of what stalking and harassment is and what our response should be."

==== Report into stalking and harassment ====
In April 2019 a report by Her Majesty's Inspectorate of Constabulary and Fire & Rescue Services concluded that stalking and harassment offences were not being properly investigated by Sussex Police. The report said that a training programme introduced after Grice's murder to help staff understand and identify stalking "was never fully completed". Most investigating officers had received no training. Not enough victims were being referred to support services and there was concern over online stalking. Police forces nationally were not using powers under stalking laws to search suspects' homes, which made investigations less thorough. Injunctions were not being used, so victims were not being properly protected. The National Police Chiefs' Council was called on to make sure police forces around the UK make improvements and that a single definition of stalking be adopted by police forces and government departments.

==== Disciplinary action ====
In April 2019 it was announced that three police officers would face disciplinary action the following May. Two officers, one retired, faced gross misconduct proceedings, whilst another officer was accused of misconduct.

PC Jon Barry Mills resigned from the police before a disciplinary hearing on 10 May 2019. One allegation against Mills is that he failed to "adequately investigate allegations of harassment and stalking" - this relates to 9 July 2016, when Grice complained Lane had stolen her back door key, crept into her bedroom and watched her sleeping. Grice made a further complaint on 12 July of Lane following her in his car, but PC Mills "failed to contact Ms Grice or update her regarding the reported incident". She was not called back and a few days later received a letter stating that the "case was closed". Friends said she was angry and could not believe the police had dropped the case and had not reported further instances of stalking as a result. It was the last time she contacted police before Lane murdered her in August.

When questioned, PC Mills said he was alarmed by some of Lane's behaviour and admitted that his failure to properly question him was an oversight.

PC Mills's first name was initially not released in an attempt by lawyers to conceal his identity.

The Independent Office for Police Conduct (IOPC), which was formed in 2018 and took over some of the IPCC's functions, stated: "Resigning from the force does not preclude officers from facing misconduct hearings."

A force disciplinary panel ruled that PC Mills's failings amounted to gross misconduct and that had he not resigned he would have been dismissed from the police force.

Former PC Trevor Godfrey was found by a disciplinary panel in July 2019 to have committed misconduct by not investigating Grice's complaints of harassment, but that he had not committed gross misconduct. He had issued Grice with a warning for wasting police time and decided to take no further action against Lane. Godfrey had since retired, but would not have been sacked if he had still been working. Grice's parents said the misconduct charge was "a joke, and the hearing a sham".

=== Documentary ===
A March 2021 documentary about the case, Murder in Slow Motion: The Shana Grice Story, was broadcast on Sky Crime.
