= London Bridge terror attack =

London Bridge terror attack may refer to:

- 2017 London Bridge attack
- 2019 London Bridge stabbing
