= Robert Trigg =

English chef convicted of manslaughter and murder

- Born: 1960s
- Convictions: Manslaughter murder

Robert Trigg (c. 1966) is a former chef convicted of the manslaughter of one former girlfriend and the murder of another.

== Background ==
Robert Trigg had a history of violence towards women. A previous relationship between Trigg and Rebecca Allcorn was ended by her in 2002 after nearly a decade because of his drinking and violent outbursts. They had a daughter.

He went into a relationship with Susan Holland, which deteriorated due to his drink-fuelled rages. In 2003 he accused her of sleeping with a neighbour and beat her, kicking her in the head and face. Apparently afraid of his own behaviour he called police, warning them "I'm going to kill her. You need to arrest me.". She spent three weeks in hospital and Trigg was later convicted of assault.

=== Death of Caroline Devlin ===
Trigg and Caroline Devlin met in 2003. She was Scottish. Neighbours described their relationship as volatile and said that Trigg had angry outbursts while drunk. After one outburst, Caroline said "I won't be here for my 40th.".

Bridget Benger, a close friend of Caroline, described how Caroline had become withdrawn and "lost her spark". Benger and Devlin had made a pact three weeks before the latter's death to look after each other's children if anything happened.

Her body was discovered by her ten-year-old daughter after Trigg had said there was something wrong with her mother. He did not call for an ambulance, leaving it to her children to do so.

Caroline Devlins' death was originally ruled as being due to an aneurysm. A dispute arose about Caroline Devlins' autopsy between Sussex Police and the coroner. The police refused to pay for a Home Office pathologist because they only wanted a "routine" examination performed. As the circumstances around her death were unexplained, the Worthing pathologist wanted a Home Office pathologist to do a more thorough examination. There existed a state of distrust between the county pathologist and the police force to do with previous requests to do with deaths in unexplained circumstances.

=== Death of Susan Nicholson ===
Trigg met Susan Nicholson after both attended alcohol rehabilitation in July 2010. They started dating in November that year before he moved into her flat that December.

Neighbour Hannah Cooper saw Susan suffering from injuries on four occasions and contacted police to report fights.

In March 2011 Robert Trigg was cautioned for punching Susan in the face after an argument.

In April 2011 Trigg called Cooper to say "It's Sue, I think she's dead.". He then left the flat, going to a nearby shop to buy cigarettes. He phoned his older brother Michael before phoning Hannah Coopher, a neighbour. She called 999.

In the months before Susan Nicholsons' death in 2011 police were called to her flat six times after 999 calls. Two days before her death he was cautioned for punching her in the face. Nicholsons' death, as with Devlin's death was not considered suspicious by Sussex Police. A later inquest into Susan Nicholsons' death ruled that she had died after Trigg had rolled inadvertently onto her while they both slept on a sofa. During the inquest, Trigg estimated they had slept on the sofa 40 times (and had used it when they first moved in, in lieu of a bed). Trigg subsequently sold his story, for an unknown amount to a magazine, in which he reiterated his claim that her death was accidental.

In October 2014 he met Deirdre Loveridge and began a relationship with her. His jealousy led to the relationship breaking down. He sent more than a hundred abusive messages and phone calls. In November 2016, he was convicted of harassment and handed a restraining order. She was so terrified of him, she left the area.

In August 2016 he entered a relationship with Caroline Yardwood, but this relationship also ended because of his jealousy. He sent her many abusive text and voicemail messages. On 21 December 2016 he turned up drunk at the homeless charity shop where she worked. He shouted insults and abuse before grabbing her by the arm and pushing her in the chest. He followed her into a back room of the shop and pushed her, causing her to fall into a door. He was arrested and later pleaded guilty to assault, harassment, and racially aggravated harassment and was jailed for twelve weeks.

== Parents' campaign ==
Susan Nicholsons' parents Peter and Elizabeth Skelton were suspicious of Robert Trigg, partly because of his violent past but also because the sofa in question was too small for a couple to sleep on. They criticised the original investigation by Sussex Police and criticised the force for ignoring their pleas to reinvestigate their daughters' death. After a five year campaign by Nicholsons' parents, Trigg was brought to trial for her death.

== Trial ==
The trial was held in Lewes Crown Court and lasted ten days. Trigg denied any wrongdoing.

During the trial, it was argued that both women were found in unusual poses and that Robert Trigg had not called for an ambulance, instead leaving that up to someone else.

=== New pathological evidence ===
Dr. Nathaniel Cary testified that Caroline Devlin had died as a result of a blow to the back of the head. He found that Ms. Nicholson had been suffocated.

=== Verdict ===
On 5 July 2017 he was convicted of the manslaughter of Caroline Devlin and the murder of Susan Nicholson.

=== Sentence ===
As he was led into court in handcuffs for sentencing, Trigg said "Isaiah 50, verse 11. They should be in here, not me.".

He was sentenced to life imprisonment with a minimum term of 25 years.

== Aftermath ==
=== Thames Valley Police report ===
In February 2018 a report by Thames Valley police concluded that Sussex Police "missed opportunities" when investigating the deaths of Caroline Devlin and Susan Nicholson.

=== In media ===
The case was featured in an episode of '999 Killer on the Line'.

=== 2021 Inquest ===
In 2021, a new inquest regarding the death of Susan Nicholson was held. Originally the coroner had intended to have an inquest solely to amend the cause of death from 'accidental' to 'unlawful killing'. However a judicial review, launched by Ms Nicholson's parents, ruled that, under Article 2 of the European Convention on Human Rights, a wider inquest should be held. The new inquest heard that the police had been called to 13 domestic abuse reports, regarding Trigg. The Assistant chief constable Fiona Macpherson, issued an apology "for the failings of the force in relation to the deaths of both Caroline Devlin and Susan Nicholson."
