= 2016 in England =

- Centuries: 19th; 20th; 21st
- Decades: 1990s; 2000s; 2010s; 2020s
- See also: 2015–16 in English football 2016–17 in English football 2016 in the United Kingdom; Other events of 2016

This article serves as a list of major events which occurred in 2016 in England

== Incumbent ==
- Monarch - Elizabeth II
- Prime Minister - David Cameron (until 13 July), Theresa May (from 13 July)

== Events ==
=== January ===
- 2 January – Rail fares in England, Scotland and Wales rise by 1.1%, in line with current inflation rates.
- 12 January – Junior doctors in England providing non-emergency care strike for 24 hours in a dispute with Health Secretary Jeremy Hunt over pay and working hours.
- 13 January – MPs give initial support to the idea of England adopting an official national anthem.
- 14 January –
  - The gang of "brazen burglars" involved in the £14m Hatton Garden jewellery heist, dubbed the "largest burglary in English legal history", face jail after the final three are convicted of involvement.
  - The Metropolitan Police announce that an extra 600 armed officers are to be trained and patrols more than doubled to help counter the threat of a terrorist attack in London.
- 15 January – Tim Peake conducts the first spacewalk by an "official" British astronaut, stepping outside an ISS airlock.
- 20 January – Unemployment rates fall to 5.1%, their lowest level in almost a decade, but figures show that wage growth has slowed.

=== March ===
- 22 March – Transgender fell-runner Lauren Jeska attempts to murder UK Athletics official Ralph Knibbs, stabbing him multiple times in Birmingham. Jeska had feared her records and ability to compete in women's events would be investigated.

=== May ===
- 2 May - Leicester City wins Premier league title for the first time in the club's 132-year history.

=== August ===
- 25 August – Shana Grice was murdered by an ex-boyfriend after he had stalked her. Sussex Police were criticised for their failure to take Grice's complaints of stalking seriously.

=== November ===
- 9 November - a tram operated by light rail company Tramlink derailed outside of Croydon, killing 7 and injuring 62.

== Deaths ==
- 11 January — David Bowie, musician and actor (born 1947)
- 14 January – Alan Rickman, actor and director (born 1946)
- 31 January – Terry Wogan, Irish radio and television broadcaster (born 1938 in Ireland)
- 25 December – George Michael, musician (born 1963)

== See also ==
- 2016 in Northern Ireland
- 2016 in Scotland
- 2016 in Wales
