= 2017 Netball Superleague season =

Netball Superleague season

- League: Netball Superleague
- Teams: 10
- Champions: Wasps
- Runners-up: Loughborough Lightning
- Season MVP: Peace Proscovia

Seasons
- ← 2016 2018 →

The 2017 Netball Superleague season (known for sponsorship reasons as the Vitality Netball Superleague) was the twelfth season of the Netball Superleague. The league was won by Wasps. In the grand final Wasps defeated regular season winners, Loughborough Lightning.

== Teams ==
The 2017 season saw the number of teams expand from eight to ten. In June 2016 England Netball announced that Yorkshire Jets had lost their place in the league. At the same time, they also announced that three new franchises, Severn Stars, Scottish Sirens and Wasps would be joining.

2017 Superleague teams	Home venue/base	Country/Region
Celtic Dragons	Sport Wales National Centre	Wales
Hertfordshire Mavericks	University of Hertfordshire	East of England
Loughborough Lightning	Loughborough University	East Midlands
Manchester Thunder	Wright Robinson College	North West England
Team Bath	University of Bath	South West England/West of England
Team Northumbria	Sport Central	North East England
Scottish Sirens	Emirates Arena	Scotland
Severn Stars	University of Worcester Arena	West Midlands
Surrey Storm	University of Surrey	Greater London/South East England
Wasps Netball	Ricoh Arena	West Midlands

== Regular season ==
=== Final table ===
Loughborough Lightning finished top of the table after winning seventeen of their eighteen matches. Wasps were the only team to beat Lightning in the regular season.

2017 Netball Superleague ladder
Pos	Team	Pld	W	D	L	GF	GA	GD	Pts	Qualification
1	Loughborough Lightning (I)	18	17	0	1	1104	882	+222	51	Qualified for the Final Four
2	Wasps (I)	18	14	0	4	1068	863	+205	42	Qualified for the Final Four
3	Manchester Thunder (I)	18	13	0	5	1016	941	+75	39	Qualified for the Final Four
4	Team Bath (I)	18	11	0	7	892	821	+71	33	Qualified for the Final Four
5	Surrey Storm (I)	18	10	0	8	1077	996	+81	30	
6	Scottish Sirens	18	9	0	9	988	963	+25	27	
7	Hertfordshire Mavericks (I)	18	6	0	12	897	1002	−105	18	
8	Severn Stars (I)	18	5	0	13	847	993	−146	15	
9	Team Northumbria (I)	18	3	0	15	884	1068	−184	9	
10	Celtic Dragons	18	2	0	16	852	1096	−244	6	

(I) Invited to play in the 2017 British Fast5 Netball All-Stars Championship

== Final Four ==
The two play-off semi-finals, the 3rd/4th place play-off and the grand final were all played at Barclaycard Arena on the Final Four weekend. The Final Four was originally due to be hosted at Manchester Arena but was switched to the Barclaycard Arena following the Manchester Arena bombing.

=== Semi-final ===
10 June 2017	Loughborough Lightning	66–45	Team Bath	Barclaycard Arena
10 June 2017	Scoring by quarter: 16–10, 29–22, 52–32, 66–45			Barclaycard Arena

10 June 2017	Wasps	63–48	Manchester Thunder	Barclaycard Arena

=== 3rd/4th place play-off ===
11 June 2017; 14:30	Manchester Thunder	56–48	Team Bath	Barclaycard Arena
11 June 2017; 14:30	Scoring by quarter: 17–11, 28–25, 42–33, 56–48			Barclaycard Arena
11 June 2017; 14:30	?		Chelsea Lewis	Barclaycard Arena

=== Grand Final ===
11 June 2017; 17:00	Wasps	55–51	Loughborough Lightning	Barclaycard Arena; Umpires: Gary Burgess and Louise Travis	Sky Sports
11 June 2017; 17:00	Scoring by quarter: 16–15, 27–26, 41–40, 55–51			Barclaycard Arena; Umpires: Gary Burgess and Louise Travis	Sky Sports
11 June 2017; 17:00	Rachel Dunn 43/47 (91%); Natalie Haythornthwaite 12/13 (92%)		Peace Proscovia 40/43 (93%); Vanessa Walker 11/16 (69%)	Barclaycard Arena; Umpires: Gary Burgess and Louise Travis	Sky Sports

== See also ==
- 2017 Team Bath netball season
