= 2019 Netball Superleague season =

- League: Netball Superleague
- Sport: Netball
- Teams: 10

2019 Netball Superleague season
- Champions: Manchester Thunder
- Runners-up: Wasps Netball
- Minor premiers: Wasps Netball

Seasons
- ← 2018 2020 →

The 2019 Netball Superleague season was the fourteenth season of the Netball Superleague, the elite domestic netball competition in the United Kingdom. The season commenced on 5 January 2019.

Manchester Thunder were the champions and defeated Wasps Netball in the Grand Final at the Copper Box Arena. The Thunder's victory ended Wasps' back-to-back run of titles and was their third championship in the competition.

== Overview ==
=== Teams ===
At the end of the previous season, England Netball announced the withdrawal of Team Northumbria from the competition. The organisation revealed a capital-based team (the London Pulse) would take their place, thereby ensuring the league remained at 10 teams.

| Team | Base |
|---|---|
| Celtic Dragons | Cardiff, Wales |
| London Pulse | Stratford, Greater London |
| Loughborough Lightning | Loughborough, Leicestershire |
| Manchester Thunder | Manchester, Greater Manchester |
| Saracens Mavericks | Hatfield, Hertfordshire |
| Severn Stars | Worcester, Worcestershire |
| Strathclyde Sirens | Glasgow, Scotland |
| Surrey Storm | Guildford, Surrey |
| Team Bath | Bath, Somerset |
| Wasps Netball | Coventry, West Midlands |

=== Format ===
The format is the same as the previous season, with a double round-robin structure utilised. The top four teams qualify for the semi-finals, with the winners of these matches meeting in the Grand Final.

== Regular season ==
- The full regular season fixture and results can be found here.

=== Round 1 ===
| Sat 5 Jan | Celtic Dragons | 41 – 58 | Team Bath | Arena Birmingham |
| 11.00am | | Stats |

| Sat 5 Jan | Wasps Netball | 72 – 42 | Loughborough Lightning | Arena Birmingham |
| 1.00pm | | Stats |

| Sat 5 Jan | Severn Stars | 49 – 51 | London Pulse | Arena Birmingham |
| 3.00pm | | Stats |

| Sat 5 Jan | Strathclyde Sirens | 56 – 38 | Surrey Storm | Arena Birmingham |
| 5.00pm | | Stats |

| Sat 5 Jan | Manchester Thunder | 58 – 51 | Mavericks | Arena Birmingham |
| 7.00pm | | Stats |

=== Round 2 ===
| Wed 6 Mar | Wasps Netball | 55 – 64 | Manchester Thunder | Ricoh Arena |
| 7.30pm | | Stats |

| Fri 11 Jan | Strathclyde Sirens | 45 – 55 | Team Bath | Emirates Arena |
| 7.30pm | | Stats |

| Sat 12 Jan | Loughborough Lightning | 52 – 44 | Severn Stars | Loughborough University |
| 6.00pm | | Stats |

| Sat 12 Jan | Surrey Storm | 39 – 59 | Mavericks | Surrey Sports Park |
| 6.00pm | | Stats |

| Sat 12 Jan | London Pulse | 40 – 67 | Celtic Dragons | Copper Box Arena |
| 7.00pm | | Stats |

=== Round 3 ===
| Fri 25 Jan | Mavericks | 64 – 51 | Loughborough Lightning | University of Hertfordshire |
| 7.30pm | | Stats |

| Fri 25 Jan | Severn Stars | 57 – 40 | Celtic Dragons | University of Gloucestershire |
| 7.30pm | | Stats |

| Sat 26 Jan | Manchester Thunder | 70 – 45 | Strathclyde Sirens | Wright Robinson College |
| 5.00pm | | Stats |

| Sat 26 Jan | London Pulse | 50 – 61 | Wasps Netball | Copper Box Arena |
| 7.00pm | | Stats |

| Mon 28 Jan | Team Bath | 50 – 56 | Surrey Storm | Team Bath Arena |
| 7.00pm | | Stats |

=== Round 4 ===
| Mon 25 Mar | Team Bath | 53 – 43 | Severn Stars | Team Bath Arena |
| 7.30pm | | Stats |

| Sat 2 Feb | Surrey Storm | 47 – 70 | Wasps Netball | Surrey Sports Park |
| 6.00pm | | Stats |

| Sat 2 Feb | Loughborough Lightning | 60 – 49 | Strathclyde Sirens | Loughborough University |
| 6.00pm | | Stats |

| Mon 4 Feb | Celtic Dragons | 44 – 66 | Mavericks | Sport Wales National Centre |
| 7.00pm | | Stats |

| Mon 4 Feb | Manchester Thunder | 62 – 47 | London Pulse | Wright Robinson College |
| 7.00pm | | Stats |

=== Round 5 ===
| Fri 8 Feb | Strathclyde Sirens | 46 – 50 | Celtic Dragons | Emirates Arena |
| 7.30pm | | Stats |

| Sat 9 Feb | Severn Stars | 49 – 62 | Manchester Thunder | University of Gloucestershire |
| 6.00pm | | Stats |

| Sat 9 Feb | Loughborough Lightning | 50 – 75 | Team Bath | Loughborough University |
| 6.00pm | | Stats |

| Sat 9 Feb | London Pulse | 49 – 69 | Surrey Storm | Copper Box Arena |
| 7.00pm | | Stats |

| Mon 11 Feb | Wasps Netball | 54 – 50 | Mavericks | Ricoh Arena |
| 7.00pm | | Stats |

- Severn Stars were deducted three points by league officials after breaching regulation 1.1.3.1 of the competition rules, which forbid two or more foreign players from operating in the same third during a match.

=== Round 6 ===
| Sat 16 Feb | Manchester Thunder | 60 – 65 | Loughborough Lightning | Wright Robinson College |
| 5:00pm | | Stats |

| Sat 16 Feb | Severn Stars | 46 – 55 | Surrey Storm | University of Gloucestershire |
| 6.00pm | | Stats |

| Sat 16 Feb | Mavericks | 68 – 45 | Team Bath | University of Hertfordshire |
| 6.00pm | | Stats |

| Mon 18 Feb | Celtic Dragons | 46 – 58 | Wasps Netball | Sport Wales National Centre |
| 7.00pm | | Stats |

| Mon 18 Feb | London Pulse | 54 – 60 | Strathclyde Sirens | Copper Box Arena |
| 7.00pm | | Stats |

=== Round 7 ===
| Fri 22 Feb | Strathclyde Sirens | 37 – 56 | Severn Stars | Emirates Arena |
| 7.00pm | | Stats |

| Fri 22 Feb | Team Bath | 46 – 57 | Wasps Netball | Team Bath Arena |
| 7.30pm | | Stats |

| Sat 23 Feb | Surrey Storm | 50 – 66 | Loughborough Lightning | Surrey Sports Park |
| 7.30pm | | Stats |

| Mon 25 Feb | Mavericks | 65 – 37 | London Pulse | University of Hertfordshire |
| 7.00pm | | Stats |

| Mon 25 Feb | Celtic Dragons | 56 – 83 | Manchester Thunder | Sport Wales National Centre |
| 7.00pm | | Stats |

=== Round 8 ===
| Fri 1 Mar | Team Bath | 60 – 56 | Manchester Thunder | Team Bath Arena |
| 7.30pm | | Stats |

| Sat 2 Mar | Surrey Storm | 46 – 48 | Celtic Dragons | Surrey Sports Park |
| 6.00pm | | Stats |

| Sat 2 Mar | Loughborough Lightning | 56 – 51 | London Pulse | Loughborough University |
| 6.00pm | | Stats |

| Sat 2 Mar | Wasps Netball | 61 – 34 | Strathclyde Sirens | Ricoh Arena |
| 7.00pm | | Stats |

| Mon 4 Mar | Severn Stars | 46 – 64 | Mavericks | University of Worcester |
| 7.00pm | | Stats |

=== Round 9 ===
| Sat 9 Mar | Strathclyde Sirens | 38 – 68 | Mavericks | Emirates Arena |
| 3.00pm | | Stats |

| Sat 9 Mar | Celtic Dragons | 57 – 70 | Loughborough Lightning | Sport Wales National Centre |
| 4.00pm | | Stats |

| Sat 9 Mar | Manchester Thunder | 66 – 42 | Surrey Storm | Belle Vue Sports Village |
| 5.00pm | | Stats |

| Sun 10 Mar | Wasps Netball | 54 – 47 | Severn Stars | Ricoh Arena |
| 4.00pm | | Stats |

| Mon 11 Mar | London Pulse | 60 – 64 | Team Bath | Copper Box Arena |
| 7.00pm | | Stats |

=== Round 10 ===
| Sat 16 Mar | Team Bath | 56 – 50 | Celtic Dragons | Team Bath Arena |
| 5.00pm | | Stats |

| Sat 16 Mar | Surrey Storm | 53 – 44 | Strathclyde Sirens | Surrey Sports Park |
| 6.00pm | | Stats |

| Sat 16 Mar | Mavericks | 49 – 57 | Manchester Thunder | University of Hertfordshire |
| 6.00pm | | Stats |

| Sat 16 Mar | London Pulse | 51 – 60 | Severn Stars | Copper Box Arena |
| 7.00pm | | Stats |

| Mon 18 Mar | Loughborough Lightning | 60 – 59 | Wasps Netball | Loughborough University |
| 7.00pm | | Stats |

=== Round 11 ===
| Fri 22 Mar | Team Bath | 51 – 47 | Strathclyde Sirens | Team Bath Arena |
| 7.30pm | | Stats |

| Sat 23 Mar | Manchester Thunder | 50 – 49 | Wasps Netball | Wright Robinson College |
| 5.00pm | | Stats |

| Sat 23 Mar | Severn Stars | 53 – 54 | Loughborough Lightning | University of Worcester |
| 6.00pm | | Stats |

| Sat 23 Mar | Mavericks | 58 – 50 | Surrey Storm | University of Hertfordshire |
| 6.00pm | | Stats |

| Mon 25 Mar | Celtic Dragons | 62 – 51 | London Pulse | Sport Wales National Centre |
| 7.00pm | | Stats |

=== Round 12 ===
| Sat 30 Mar | Celtic Dragons | 52 – 53 | Severn Stars | Sport Wales National Centre |
| 7.30pm | | Stats |

| Sat 30 Mar | Loughborough Lightning | 54 – 49 | Mavericks | Loughborough University |
| 6.00pm | | Stats |

| Sun 31 Mar | Wasps Netball | 67 – 35 | London Pulse | Ricoh Arena |
| 4.00pm | | Stats |

| Mon 1 Apr | Strathclyde Sirens | 36 – 62 | Manchester Thunder | Emirates Arena |
| 7.30pm | | Stats |

| Mon 1 Apr | Surrey Storm | 48 – 57 | Team Bath | Surrey Sports Park |
| 7.00pm | | Stats |

=== Round 13 ===
| Sat 6 Apr | London Pulse | 62 – 59 | Mavericks | Copper Box Arena |
| 5.00pm | | Stats |

| Sat 6 Apr | Manchester Thunder | 73 – 46 | Celtic Dragons | Belle Vue Sports Village |
| 5.00pm | | Stats |

| Sat 6 Apr | Severn Stars | 49 – 40 | Strathclyde Sirens | University of Gloucestershire |
| 6.00pm | | Stats |

| Sat 6 Apr | Wasps Netball | 61 – 46 | Team Bath | Ricoh Arena |
| 6.00pm | | Stats |

| Mon 8 Apr | Loughborough Lightning | 59 – 63 | Surrey Storm | Loughborough University |
| 7.00pm | | Stats |

=== Round 14 ===
| Fri 12 Apr | Team Bath | 57 – 55 | Loughborough Lightning | Team Bath Arena |
| 7.30pm | | Stats |

| Sat 13 Apr | Celtic Dragons | 59 – 49 | Strathclyde Sirens | Sport Wales National Centre |
| 4.00pm | | Stats |

| Sat 13 Apr | Manchester Thunder | 47 – 50 | Severn Stars | Belle Vue Sports Village |
| 5.00pm | | Stats |

| Sat 13 Apr | Surrey Storm | 56 – 53 | London Pulse | Surrey Sports Park |
| 6.00pm | | Stats |

| Mon 15 Apr | Mavericks | 51 – 58 | Wasps Netball | Marshall Arena |
| 7.00pm | | Stats |

=== Round 15 ===
| Sat 20 Apr | Strathclyde Sirens | 44 – 59 | Loughborough Lightning | Emirates Arena |
| 2.00pm | | Stats |

| Sat 20 Apr | London Pulse | 42 – 71 | Manchester Thunder | Emirates Arena |
| 4.00pm | | Stats |

| Sat 20 Apr | Wasps Netball | 76 – 42 | Surrey Storm | Ricoh Arena |
| 5.00pm | | Stats |

| Sat 20 Apr | Severn Stars | 42 – 53 | Team Bath | University of Gloucestershire |
| 6.00pm | | Stats |

| Sat 20 Apr | Mavericks | 55 – 50 | Celtic Dragons | Ricoh Arena |
| 7.00pm | | Stats |

=== Round 16 ===
| Sun 21 Apr | Wasps Netball | 64 – 48 | Celtic Dragons | Ricoh Arena |
| 2.00pm | | Stats |

| Sun 21 Apr | Strathclyde Sirens | 47 – 44 | London Pulse | Emirates Arena |
| 2.00pm | | Stats |

| Sun 21 Apr | Surrey Storm | 46 – 51 | Severn Stars | Ricoh Arena |
| 4.00pm | | Stats |

| Sun 21 Apr | Loughborough Lightning | 60 – 57 | Manchester Thunder | Emirates Arena |
| 4.00pm | | Stats |

| Sun 21 Apr | Team Bath | 45 – 51 | Mavericks | Ricoh Arena |
| 6.00pm | | Stats |

=== Round 17 ===
| Fri 26 Apr | Strathclyde Sirens | 41 – 56 | Wasps Netball | Emirates Arena |
| 7.30pm | | Stats |

| Sat 27 Apr | Celtic Dragons | 58 – 51 | Surrey Storm | Sport Wales National Centre |
| 4.00pm | | Stats |

| Sat 27 Apr | London Pulse | 62 – 67 | Loughborough Lightning | Copper Box Arena |
| 4.00pm | | Stats |

| Sat 27 Apr | Mavericks | 62 – 48 | Severn Stars | University of Essex |
| 4.00pm | | Stats |

| Sat 27 Apr | Manchester Thunder | 53 – 56 | Team Bath | Wright Robinson College |
| 5.00pm | | Stats |

=== Round 18 ===
| Sat 4 May | Loughborough Lightning | 67 – 56 | Celtic Dragons | Loughborough University |
| 6.00pm | | Stats |

| Sat 4 May | Mavericks | 50 – 45 | Strathclyde Sirens | University of Hertfordshire |
| 6.00pm | | Stats |

| Sat 4 May | Team Bath | 72 – 50 | London Pulse | Team Bath Arena |
| 6.00pm | | Stats |

| Sat 4 May | Severn Stars | 45 – 60 | Wasps Netball | University of Worcester |
| 6.00pm | | Stats |

| Sat 4 May | Surrey Storm | 55 – 60 | Manchester Thunder | Surrey Sports Park |
| 6.00pm | | Stats |

== Ladder ==
2019 Netball Superleague ladder
| Pos | Team | Pld | W | D | L | GF | GA | GD | Pts | Qualification |
|---|---|---|---|---|---|---|---|---|---|---|
| 1 | Wasps (Q) | 18 | 15 | 0 | 3 | 1092 | 844 | +248 | 45 | Qualified for the Finals series |
| 2 | Manchester Thunder (Q) | 18 | 13 | 0 | 5 | 1111 | 913 | +198 | 39 | Qualified for the Finals series |
| 3 | Team Bath (Q) | 18 | 13 | 0 | 5 | 999 | 933 | +66 | 39 | Qualified for the Finals series |
| 4 | Loughborough Lightning (Q) | 18 | 13 | 0 | 5 | 1047 | 1022 | +25 | 39 | Qualified for the Finals series |
| 5 | Saracens Mavericks (Q) | 18 | 12 | 0 | 6 | 1039 | 881 | +158 | 36 | |
| 6 | Severn Stars (Q) | 18 | 7 | 0 | 11 | 888 | 933 | −45 | 18 (Note: Severn Stars were deducted three points for fielding an ineligible player in Round 5.) | |
| 7 | Celtic Dragons (Q) | 18 | 6 | 0 | 12 | 930 | 1043 | −113 | 18 | |
| 8 | Surrey Storm (Q) | 18 | 6 | 0 | 12 | 906 | 1026 | −120 | 18 | |
| 9 | Strathclyde Sirens | 18 | 3 | 0 | 15 | 803 | 995 | −192 | 9 | |
| 10 | London Pulse | 18 | 2 | 0 | 16 | 889 | 1114 | −225 | 6 | |

(Q) Qualify for the 2019 Fast5 Netball All-Stars Championship

== Finals series ==
=== Semi-final ===
| Sat 11 May; 2.00pm | Report; Stats | Wasps Netball | 74–54 | Loughborough Lightning | University of Warwick | Sky Sports |

=== Semi-final ===
| Sat 11 May; 4.00pm | Report; Stats | Manchester Thunder | 57–54 | Team Bath | Wright Robinson College | Sky Sports |

=== Third-place playoff ===
| Sat 18 May; 3.00pm | Report; Stats | Loughborough Lightning | 56–62 | Team Bath | Copper Box Arena | Sky Sports |

=== Grand Final ===
| Sat 18 May; 5.30pm | Report; Stats | Wasps Netball | 52–57 | Manchester Thunder | Copper Box Arena; Umpires: Gary Burgess and Jackie Mizon | Sky Sports |
