= Severn Stars =

English super league netball team, 2016–2024

- Founded: 2016
- Disbanded: 2024
- Based in: University of Worcester
- Regions: West Midlands; South West England
- Home venue: University of Worcester Arena
- Head coach: Jo Trip
- League: Netball Superleague
- Website: www.severnstars.co.uk
Uniform
Uniform

Severn Stars are an English netball team based at the University of Worcester. The team is named after the River Severn, which runs through Worcester and Gloucester, the original home cities of the two universities. Severn Stars were formed in 2016 and since 2017 their senior team has played in the Netball Superleague. The franchise disbanded at the end of the 2024 season after it was not offered a contract in the relaunched Netball Superleague. Birmingham Panthers was instead named as a franchise for the region and entered its inaugural season in 2025.

== History ==
=== New franchise ===
In June 2016 it was announced that Severn Stars, together with Wasps Netball and Scottish Sirens, would be one of three new franchises that would join the Netball Superleague for the 2017 season. Severn Stars were formed as a partnership between the University of Worcester and the University of Gloucestershire. They subsequently appointed Anita Navin and Pamela Cookey as directors of netball and Mo'onia Gerrard as their first head coach. On 18 February 2017, with a team that included Josie Janz-Dawson and Eleanor Cardwell, Severn Stars made their Netball Superleague debut in an away game against Surrey Storm, losing 58–40.

== Notable players ==
=== 2024 squad ===
2024 Severn Stars roster
Players
Coaching staff

Nat.	Name	Position(s)	DoB	Height
(South Africa)	Sigi Burger	GS, GA	23 February 1996	1.90 m (6 ft 3 in)
(England)	Rebekah Airey	GD, GK, WD	19 March 1996	1.82 m (6 ft 0 in)
(England)	Jessica Shaw	C, WA	17 April 1996	1.70 m (5 ft 7 in)
(England)	Gabby Marshall	C, WD	9 April 1996	1.74 m (5 ft 9 in)
(England)	Suzie Liveseidge	GA, WA	1 June 2001	1.77 m (5 ft 10 in)
(New Zealand)	Jo Trip	GD, GK	24 June 1990	1.88 m (6 ft 2 in)
(Wales)	Betsy Creak	GS, GA	10 August 1996	1.91 m (6 ft 3 in)
(Wales)	Ella Powell-Davies	WD, GD	18 March 1999	1.80 m (5 ft 11 in)
(South Africa)	Lefébre Rademan	GS, GA	22 August 1996	1.72 m (5 ft 8 in)
(England)	Ashleigh Dekker	C, WA	16 February 1999	1.80 m (5 ft 11 in)
(Northern Ireland)	Niamh Cooper	WD, C	29 July 1992	1.74 m (5 ft 9 in)
(England)	Jasmine Brown	GD, GK	26 November 2001	–
(England)	Lily Smith (TP)	GA, GS	28 November 2003	–
(England)	Jess Haynes (TP)	GD, GK	13 June 2001	–
(England)	Ruth Hughes (TP)	WA, C	10 August 2003	–

Head coach

- Jo Trip

Notes

- (c) – Captain
- (cc) – Co-captain
- (vc) – Vice-captain
- – Injury / maternity leave
- (TRP) – Temporary Replacement Player
Player profiles: Team website
Last updated: 12 Sept 2023

=== Internationals ===
England

- Ama Agbeze
- Eleanor Cardwell
- Jodie Gibson

Australia

- Ashleigh Brazill

Jamaica

- Malysha Kelly
- Jodi-Ann Ward

Malawi

- Towera Vinkhumbo

New Zealand

- Liana Leota

South Africa

- Maryka Holtzhausen
- Phumza Maweni

Wales

- Bethan Dyke
- Nia Jones

Zimbabwe

- Adelaide Muskwe

== Home venues ==
On 3 March 2017 Severn Stars made their home Netball Superleague debut with a 53–46 win against Celtic Dragons at the University of Worcester Arena. Severn Stars have also played home games at the University of Gloucestershire Arena

== Coaches ==
=== Head coaches ===
Coach	Years
(Australia) Mo'onia Gerrard	2016–2017
(England) Sam Bird	2017–2019
(New Zealand) Melissa Bessell	2019–2022
(New Zealand) Jo Trip	2022-

=== Directors of netball ===
Coach	Years
(England) Pamela Cookey	2016–
(England) Anita Navin	2016–
