= Wasps Netball =

English netball team

- Founded: 2016
- Disbanded: 2022
- Based in: Coventry,
- Regions: West Midlands
- Home venue: Coventry Building Society Arena; University of Warwick
- Head coach: Cathrine Tuivaiti
- Captain: Josie Huckle
- League: Netball Superleague
Uniform

Wasps Netball were an English netball team based at the Coventry Building Society Arena in Coventry, Warwickshire. Wasps Netball was formed in 2016 as a partnership with the Premiership Rugby team, Wasps RFC. Since 2017 their senior team has played in the Netball Superleague. They were Superleague champions in 2017 and 2018. The holding company for the team were placed in insolvency on 17 October 2022 and a new company called "Wasps Netball Limited" was incorporated with Companies House on 26 October 2022.

== History ==
=== New franchise ===
In June 2016 it was announced that Wasps, together with Severn Stars and Scottish Sirens, would be one of three new franchises that would join the Netball Superleague for the 2017 season. Wasps subsequently appointed Tamsin Greenway as their first director of netball. Wasps Netball was formed as a partnership with the Premiership Rugby team, Wasps RFC. In December 2016 Wasps defeated Team Bath 22–15 to win the Mike Greenwood Trophy. In January 2017 Wasps also played in Team Bath's pre-season Tri-Tournament. On 21 February 2017 Wasps made their Superleague debut at the Emirates Arena with a 57–43 win against fellow newcomers Sirens. On 5 March 2017 Wasps made their home Superleague debut at the Ricoh Arena with a 51–47 win against Hertfordshire Mavericks.

=== Superleague champions ===
Wasps were Superleague champions in 2017 and 2018. In 2017, with a team that included Tamsin Greenway, Rachel Dunn, Bongiwe Msomi and Natalie Haythornthwaite, Wasps defeated Loughborough Lightning 55–51 in the grand final. In 2018 Wasps retained the Superleague title after again defeating Loughborough Lightning 55–51 in the grand final. The winning squad included Greenway, Dunn, Haythornthwaite, Samantha May and Jade Clarke.

=== Demise ===
Wasps Netball were placed into administration on 17 October 2022 with all their playing and coaching staff made redundant.

On 10 November 2022, England Netball announced that Wasps Netball would no longer be eligible to compete in the Netball Super League moving forwards.

== Senior finals ==
=== Netball Superleague Grand Finals ===
Between 2017 and 2019 Wasps have played in three successive Netball Superleague grand finals.

Season	Winners	Score	Runners up	Venue
2017	Wasps	55–51	Loughborough Lightning	Barclaycard Arena
2018	Wasps	55–51	Loughborough Lightning	Copper Box Arena
2019	Manchester Thunder	57–52	Wasps	Copper Box Arena

=== Fast5 Netball All-Stars Championship ===
Wasps have played in two British Fast5 Netball All-Stars Championship finals.

Season	Winners	Score	Runners up	Venue
2018	Wasps	42–32	benecosMavericks	Copper Box Arena
2019	Loughborough Lightning	61–35	Wasps	Copper Box Arena

== Home venue ==
Wasps played their home games at both the Coventry Building Society Arena and in the Sport and Wellness Hub at the University of Warwick. The team also trained at the University of Warwick.

== Notable players ==
=== 2023 squad ===
2023 Wasps Netball roster
Players
Coaching staff

Nat.	Name	Position(s)	DoB	Height
(New Zealand)	Cathrine Tuivaiti	GS	25 October 1986	1.89 m (6 ft 2 in)
(England)	Chloe Essam	GA, GS	9 December 1999	1.80 m (5 ft 11 in)
(England)	Rachel Dunn	GS, GA	14 November 1982	1.89 m (6 ft 2 in)
(England)	Georgia Lees	C, WA	15 February 1994	1.74 m (5 ft 9 in)
(England)	Josie Huckle	GD, GK	24 September 1991	1.88 m (6 ft 2 in)
(England)	Ella Powell-Davies	GD, WD	18 March 1999	1.77 m (5 ft 10 in)
(England)	Leah Goss	C, WD	27 November 1998	1.73 m (5 ft 8 in)
(England)	Lauren Nicholls	WD,GD, C	26 March 1991	–
(England)	Rachael Fee	GD, GK	19 September 2001	1.83 m (6 ft 0 in)
(England)	Peace Akinyemi	GK, GD	24 September 2003	1.82 m (6 ft 0 in)
(England)	Hannah Diamond	WA, GA	17 October 2003	1.75 m (5 ft 9 in)
(England)	Beth Gabriel	GA, GS		–

Head coach

- Cathrine Tuivaiti

Notes

- (c) – Captain
- (cc) – Co-captain
- (vc) – Vice-captain
- – Injury / maternity leave
- (TRP) – Temporary Replacement Player
Player profiles: Team website
Last updated: 8 October 2022

=== Internationals ===
England

- Jade Clarke
- Rachel Dunn
- Chloe Essam
- George Fisher
- Tamsin Greenway
- Natalie Haythornthwaite
- Francesca Williams

South Africa

- Bongiwe Msomi
- Renske Stoltz

== Head coaches ==
Coach	Years
(England) Tamsin Greenway	2016–2018
(England) Mel Mansfield	2018–2022
(New Zealand) Cathrine Tuivaiti	2022–2023

== Honours ==
- Netball Superleague
  - Winners: 2017, 2018: 2
  - Runners up: 2019: 1
- British Fast5 Netball All-Stars Championship
  - Winners: 2018: 1
  - Runners up: 2019: 1
- Mike Greenwood Trophy
  - Winners: 2017: 1
