= Loughborough Lightning (netball) =

Netball Superleague team

- Nickname(s): Lightning
- Founded: 2005
- Based in: Loughborough University
- Regions: East Midlands
- Home venues: Motorpoint Arena; Sir David Wallace Sports Centre, Loughborough University
- Head coach: Vic Burgess
- Premierships: 2021, 2023, 2024
- League: Netball Superleague
- Website: www.lboro.ac.uk
Home	Away

Loughborough Lightning is an English netball team based at Loughborough University. Their senior team plays in the Netball Super League where they have made seven grand finals, winning three in 2021, 2023 and 2024.

== History ==
In 2005 Loughborough Lightning were named as the East Midlands franchise in the new Netball Super League. Together with Brunel Hurricanes, Celtic Dragons, Leeds Carnegie, Galleria Mavericks, Northern Thunder, Team Bath and Team Northumbria, Lightning were founder members of the league. Together with the women's cricket team, the women's rugby union team, the women's cycling team, the women's football team and the women's wheelchair basketball team, the netball team is one of five women's sports teams based at Loughborough University that use the Loughborough Lightning name.

Lightning made their first Super League grand final in 2007–08 where the lost to Galleria Mavericks.

They made further grand finals 2017 and 2018 but lost to Wasps Netball both times 55-11.

Lightning coached by Sara Francis-Bayman and captained by Natalie Panagarry won their first Super League title in 2021, defeating Team Bath. They would go on to make four consecutive grand finals, winning back to back titles in 2023 and 2024.

== Senior finals ==
=== Netball Super League Grand Finals ===
Loughborough Lightning made their Netball Super Leagueeague Grand Final debut in 2007–08.

Season	Winners	Score	Runners up	Venue
2007–08	Galleria Mavericks	43–39	Loughborough Lightning	K2 Leisure Centre
2017	Wasps Netball	55–51	Loughborough Lightning	Barclaycard Arena
2018	Wasps Netball	55–51	Loughborough Lightning	Copper Box Arena
2021	Loughborough Lightning	49–32	Team Bath	Copper Box Arena
2022	Manchester Thunder	60–53	Loughborough Lightning	Copper Box Arena
2023	Loughborough Lightning	57–48	London Pulse	Copper Box Arena
2024	Loughborough Lightning	70-54	Manchester Thunder	Resorts World Arena
2025	London Pulse	53-45	Loughborough Lightning	The O2 Arena

=== Fast5 Netball All-Stars Championship ===
In 2017 Loughborough Lightning won the inaugural British Fast5 Netball All-Stars Championship.

Season	Winners	Score	Runners up	Venue
2017	Loughborough Lightning	35–33	Team Bath	The O2 Arena
2019	Loughborough Lightning	61–35	Wasps Netball	Copper Box Arena

== Home venue ==
Loughborough Lightning play their home games at the Sir David Wallace Sports Centre at Loughborough University and Motorpoint Arena, Nottingham.

== Notable players ==
=== 2026 squad ===
2026 Loughborough Lightning roster
Players
Coaching staff

Nat.	Name	Position(s)	DoB	Height
(England)	Beth Cobden	WD, C, GD	3 February 1993	1.78 m (5 ft 10 in)
(England)	Alice Harvey	GK, GD	3 April 2001	1.90 m (6 ft 3 in)
(England)	Hannah Joseph	WA, C	8 February 1994	1.67 m (5 ft 6 in)
(England)	Natalie Panagarry (c)	C, WD	27 December 1990	1.70 m (5 ft 7 in)
(England)	Ella Clark	GA, GS	8 February 1992	1.91 m (6 ft 3 in)
(South Africa)	Shadine van der Merwe	GD, WD, GK	25 November 1992	1.79 m (5 ft 10 in)
(England)	Berri Neil	GA, GS	12 February 2003	1.82 m (6 ft 0 in)
(Trinidad and Tobago)	Samantha Wallace	GS	16 January 1994	1.93 m (6 ft 4 in)
(England)	Jessica Shaw	C, WA	17 April 1996	1.70 m (5 ft 7 in)
(England)	Celena Appleby-Prince	GK,GD	4 November 2004	1.86 m (6 ft 1 in)

Head coach

- Vic Burgess

Notes

- (c) – Captain
- (cc) – Co-captain
- (vc) – Vice-captain
- – Injury / maternity leave
- (TRP) – Temporary Replacement Player
Player profiles: Team website
Last updated: 2 January 2026

=== Internationals ===
England

- Ama Agbeze
- Karen Atkinson
- Sophia Candappa
- Ella Clark
- Jade Clarke
- Beth Cobden
- Sasha Corbin
- Chloe Essam
- Jodie Gibson
- Layla Guscoth
- Joanne Harten
- Hannah Joseph
- Olivia Murphy
- Natalie Panagarry
- Emma Thacker
- Fran Williams

Northern Ireland

- Niamh Cooper
- Michelle Drayne
- Michelle Magee
- Oonagh McCulloch

Jamaica

- Shamera Sterling
- Vanessa Walker

Scotland

- Ella Gibbons

South Africa

- Maryka Holtzhausen
- Phumza Maweni
- Renske Stoltz
- Shadine van der Merwe

Uganda

- Mary Cholhok Nuba
- Peace Proscovia

Wales

- Rebecca James

Zimbabwe

- Adelaide Muskwe

== Head coaches ==
Coach	Years
(New Zealand) Margaret Foster	2013–2014
(England) Karen Atkinson	2014–2017
(England) Anna Carter	2017–2018
(England) Sara Bayman	2018–2021
(England) Victoria Burgess	2021-

== Honours ==
- Netball Super League: 2021, 2023, 2024 Runners up: 2007–08, 2017, 2018, 2022
- British Fast5 Netball All-Stars Championship: 2017, 2019

== Sponsorship ==
In February 2023, clothing retailer Long Tall Sally were confirmed as the team's headline sponsor for the 2023 Netball Super League season.
