= 2018 Netball Superleague season =

- League: Netball Superleague
- Sport: Netball
- Number of teams: 10

2018 Netball Superleague season
- Champions: Wasps Netball
- Runners-up: Loughborough Lightning
- Minor premiers: Wasps Netball

Seasons
- ← 2017 2019 →

The 2018 Netball Superleague season was the thirteenth season of the Netball Superleague, the elite domestic netball competition in the United Kingdom.

== Overview ==
=== Format ===
The format was the same as the previous season, with a double round-robin structure utilised. The top four teams qualify for the semi-finals, with the winners of these matches meeting in the grand final.

=== Teams ===
Team	Base
Celtic Dragons	Cardiff, Wales
benecosMavericks	Hatfield, Hertfordshire
Loughborough Lightning	Loughborough, Leicestershire
Manchester Thunder	Manchester, Greater Manchester
Severn Stars	Worcester, Worcestershire
Sirens	Glasgow, Scotland
Surrey Storm	Guildford, Surrey
Team Bath	Bath, Somerset
Team Northumbria	Newcastle, Tyne and Wear
Wasps Netball	Coventry, West Midlands

== Results ==
=== Regular season ===
- To read scores and statistics from all matches throughout the season click here.

=== Ladder ===
2018 Netball Superleague ladder
Pos	Team	Pld	W	L	GF	GA	GD	Pts	Qualification
1	Wasps Netball (Q)	18	16	2	1123	821	+302	48	Qualify for the play-offs
2	Loughborough Lightning (Q)	18	15	3	1054	852	+202	45	Qualify for the play-offs
3	Manchester Thunder (Q)	18	15	3	1056	887	+169	45	Qualify for the play-offs
4	Team Bath (Q)	18	11	7	922	849	+73	33	Qualify for the play-offs
5	benecosMavericks (Q)	18	10	8	979	912	+67	30	
6	Severn Stars (Q)	18	8	10	904	883	+21	24	
7	Surrey Storm (Q)	18	5	13	904	1004	−100	15	
8	Sirens (Q)	18	5	13	815	962	−147	15	
9	Team Northumbria (Note: London Pulse replaced Team Northumbria for the 2019 Netball Superleague season)	18	3	15	817	1022	−205	9	
10	Celtic Dragons	18	2	16	768	1150	−382	6	

(Q) Top eight qualify for the 2018 Fast5 Netball All-Stars Championship

=== Grand Final ===
7 July 2018; 6.00pm	Report; Stats	Wasps Netball	55–51	Loughborough Lightning	Copper Box Arena, London; Umpires: Gary Burgess and Jackie Mizon
7 July 2018; 6.00pm	Report; Stats	Scoring by quarter: 12-12, 16-12, 15-16, 12-11			Copper Box Arena, London; Umpires: Gary Burgess and Jackie Mizon

- Player of the match: Rachel Dunn (Wasps)
- The match was a re-match of their 2017 Grand Final and was won by an identical scoreline.
