= British Fast5 Netball All-Stars Championship =

United Kingdom netball tournament

- Founded: 2017
- Country: United Kingdom
- Most recent champion: Team Bath (1st title)
- Most titles: Loughborough Lightning (2 titles)
- Broadcaster: Sky Sports
- Related competitions: Netball Superleague
- Website: www.fast5allstars.com

The British Fast5 Netball All-Stars Championship is a Fast5 netball pre-season tournament featuring teams from the Netball Superleague. The rules of the tournament are similar, though not identical, to the Fast5 Netball World Series. In 2017 Loughborough Lightning won the inaugural championship.

== History ==
The tournament was established in March 2017 by England Netball in partnership with Barry Hearn's Matchroom Sport. In September 2017 Loughborough Lightning won the inaugural championship.

== Format and rules ==
- The top eight teams from the past season's Netball Superleague are all invited to participate.
- Each team has a ten player squad which can feature two All-Star or guest players.
- The tournament features five-a-side teams and 12-minute matches. It also features multiple point shots, unlimited roll on-roll-off substitutions and double point power plays.
- The tournament uses a double elimination format and is completed in a single day.

== Finals ==
Season	Winners	Score	Runners up	Venue
2017	Loughborough Lightning	35–33	Team Bath	The O2 Arena
2018	Wasps	42–32	benecosMavericks	Copper Box Arena
2019	Loughborough Lightning	61–35	Wasps	Copper Box Arena
2020	Not held			
2021	Team Bath	23–17	Saracens Mavericks	Copper Box Arena
