= Netball Super League (United Kingdom) =

Professional netball league

- Current season, competition or edition: 2026 Netball Super League season
- Sport: Netball
- First season: 2005–06
- Director: Claire Nelson
- Organising body: England Netball
- No. of teams: 8
- Country: United Kingdom
- Most recent champion: London Pulse (1st title)
- Most titles: Team Bath (5 titles)
- Broadcasters: Sky Sports; BBC Sport
- Related competitions: British Fast5 Netball All-Stars Championship; Super Cup
- Website: www.netballsl.com

The Netball Super League is an elite netball league in the United Kingdom. The league is organised by England Netball and features teams based in England, Wales and previously Scotland. The Super League commenced at the 2005–06 season, replacing the Super Cup as the elite netball competition in England. From 2016 to 2021 the league was sponsored by VitalityHealth and, as a result, was known as the Vitality Netball Super League. Since 2022, it has been known as the Netball Super League.

The league's most successful active team is Manchester Thunder, who recorded their fifth title in 2026. Team Bath, who along with three other teams were removed from the competition after the 2024 season as part of the league's professionalisation strategy, have also recorded five titles.

== Teams ==
=== Current teams ===
Team	Coach	Home venue/base	City	Debut season
Birmingham Panthers	Sonia Mkoloma	BP Pulse Live Arena Utilita Arena Birmingham Coventry Skydome University of Worcester Arena	Birmingham	2025
Dragons	Reinga Bloxham	Cardiff City House of Sport M&S Bank Arena	Cardiff and Liverpool	2005–06
Leeds Rhinos	Lauren Palmer	First Direct Arena Canon Medical Arena	Leeds	2021
London Mavericks	Tamsin Greenway	Wembley Arena University of Hertfordshire	London	2005–06
London Pulse	Sam Bird	Copper Box Arena	London	2019
Loughborough Lightning	Vic Burgess	Loughborough University Motorpoint Arena	Loughborough	2005–06
Manchester Thunder	Karen Greig	Manchester Arena, Belle Vue Sports Village, Liverpool Arena	Manchester	2005–06
Nottingham Forest Netball	Chelsea Pitman	Motorpoint Arena	Nottingham	2025

Notes

- ^1 Between 2001 and 2012, Manchester Thunder played as Northern Thunder.
- ^2 London Mavericks previously played as Saracens Mavericks, Galleria Mavericks, Hertfordshire Mavericks and benecosMavericks.
- ^3 Surrey Storm originally played as Brunel Hurricanes.
- ^4 Cardiff Dragons previously played as Celtic Dragons.

=== Former teams ===
Team	Region	Debut season	Final season
Glasgow Wildcats	Scotland	2008–09	2011
Leeds Carnegie/Yorkshire Jets	Yorkshire	2005–06	2016
Team Northumbria	North East England	2005–06	2018
Wasps Netball	Coventry, West Midlands	2017	2022
Surrey Storm	Guildford	2005–06	2024
Team Bath	Bath, South West	2005–06	2024
Severn Stars	Worcester	2017	2024
Strathclyde Sirens	Glasgow (Scotland)	2017	2024

Notes

- ^1 Between 2005–06 and 2011, Yorkshire Jets played as Leeds Carnegie.

== History ==
Season	Key events
2005	Brunel Hurricanes, Celtic Dragons, Galleria Mavericks, Leeds Carnegie, Loughborough Lightning, Northern Thunder, Team Bath and Team Northumbria become founder members of the new Netball Super League.
2005–06	With a squad that included Pamela Cookey, Rachel Dunn, Stacey Francis, Jess Garland, Tamsin Greenway and Geva Mentor, Team Bath win the inaugural Netball Super League title. Team Bath subsequently dominate the early seasons of the league, winning further Super League titles in 2006–07, 2008–09, 2009–10 and 2013.
2007–08	After playing and losing in the first two grand finals, the Mavericks win their first Super League title.
2008–09	Glasgow Wildcats become the first team from Scotland to join the league. However they only play in the league for three seasons and withdraw following the 2011 season.
2009–10	Brunel Hurricanes end their partnership with Brunel University and relocate to the University of Surrey to become Surrey Storm.
2012	Northern Thunder win their first Super League title. They subsequently change their name to Manchester Thunder before the 2013 season.
2015	After making four grand final appearances in five years, Surrey Storm win their first Super League title.
2016	Surrey Storm retain the Super League title. Yorkshire Jets, formerly Leeds Carnegie, play their final Super League season.
2017	Three new franchises Severn Stars, Scottish Sirens and Wasps make their Super League debuts. Wasps go on to win the Grand Final in their debut season.
2018	Wasps retain the Super League title Team Northumbria play their final Super League season.
2019	London Pulse make their Super League debut. Manchester Thunder win their third Super League title. Leeds Rhinos are announced as a new franchise team for 2021.
2020/2021	Following disruptions to the 2020 season due to the COVID-19 pandemic, England Netball took the "difficult decision" to suspend the league until 2021. This followed consultation with the league's board as well as all 10 teams and stakeholders. The 2021 season was staged over a shortened period and behind closed doors at select venues. Loughborough Lightning win their first Super League title.
2022	Manchester Thunder win their fourth title. Wasps Netball play their final Super League season.
2023	England Netball announces the NSL will be relaunched in 2025 in a drive towards professionalisation, indicating bigger venues and arenas, competition improvements to deliver more thrilling games and advancements in the elite environment to create rewarding careers in netball. Loughborough Lightning win their second title.
2024	Loughborough Lightning win their third title. England Netball announce the confirmed teams for the relaunched NSL, with Surrey Storm, Team Bath Netball, Severn Stars and Strathclyde Sirens all playing their final Super League season. Birmingham Panthers and Nottingham Forrest netball were confirmed as new teams for the 2025 season, with the league shrunk to down to 8 teams.
2025	As part of the revamped league new rules were introduced in 2025 to create a closer competition and more thrilling matches: Super shot - Shooters can score two-point shots from a certain area of the shooting circle during the final five minutes of all four quarters in matches.; No draws - Matches will go into 10-minutes of extra time if the scores are level after 60 minutes.; Timeouts - Each team will be allowed to call one 90-second tactical timeout per game.; More points - One league table point will be on offer for losing teams who finish within five points of their winning opponents in games.; London Pulse win their first title.
2026	Manchester Thunder win their fifth title.

== Grand Finals ==
Season	Winners	Score	Runners up	Venue
2005–06	Team Bath	43–35	Galleria Mavericks	Guildford Spectrum
2006–07	Team Bath (2)	53–45	Galleria Mavericks	Guildford Spectrum
2007–08	Galleria Mavericks	43–39	Loughborough Lightning	K2 Leisure Centre
2008–09	Team Bath (3)	54–46	Galleria Mavericks	Coventry Skydome
2009–10	Team Bath (4)	51–44	Hertfordshire Mavericks	Trent FM Arena
2011	Hertfordshire Mavericks (2)	57–46	Surrey Storm	Herts Sports Village
2012	Northern Thunder	57–55	Surrey Storm	SportHouse
2013	Team Bath (5)	62–56	Celtic Dragons	University of Worcester Arena
2014	Manchester Thunder (2)	49–48	Surrey Storm	University of Worcester Arena
2015	Surrey Storm	56–39	Hertfordshire Mavericks	Copper Box Arena
2016	Surrey Storm (2)	55–53	Manchester Thunder	Copper Box Arena
2017	Wasps	55–51	Loughborough Lightning	Barclaycard Arena
2018	Wasps (2)	55–51	Loughborough Lightning	Copper Box Arena
2019	Manchester Thunder (3)	57–52	Wasps	Copper Box Arena
2021	Loughborough Lightning	49–32	Team Bath	Copper Box Arena
2022	Manchester Thunder (4)	60–53	Loughborough Lightning	Copper Box Arena
2023	Loughborough Lightning (2)	57–48	London Pulse	Copper Box Arena
2024	Loughborough Lightning (3)	70-54	Manchester Thunder	Resorts World Arena
2025	London Pulse	53-45	Loughborough Lightning	O2 Arena
2026	Manchester Thunder (5)	54-51	London Pulse	Co-op Live

== Winners ==
Winners	Seasons	Titles
Team Bath	2005–06, 2006–07, 2008–09, 2009–10, 2013	5
Manchester Thunder	2012, 2014, 2019, 2022, 2026	5
Loughborough Lightning	2021, 2023, 2024	3
Mavericks	2007–08, 2011	2
Surrey Storm	2015, 2016	2
Wasps	2017, 2018	2
London Pulse	2025	1

== Sponsorship ==
Sponsors	Seasons
Figleaves	2005–06
The Co-operative Group	2007–2010
Fiat Group Automobiles	2011–2012
Zeo	2014
VitalityHealth	2016–2021

== Television ==
Sky Sports are the Netball Super League's official broadcast partner and they broadcast live matches throughout the season. In November 2016 England Netball and Sky Sports signed a four-year deal which saw every live match made available to all Sky TV customers on Sky Sports Mix. A "multi-year deal" was reached in 2021, which expanded Sky's coverage to allow for all matches to be either televised on Sky Sports or streamed via YouTube.

== NXT Gen ==
As part of the 2025 relaunched Netball Super League, a new underpinning league was announced called NXT Gen, designed to develop the next generation of players and provide a pipeline of talent for the Super League. Players competing in the NXT Gen League can be called up as temporary replacement players in the NSL where a match fee will be paid to them along with remuneration for any additional NSL requirements. The league is primarily for U23s but allows four players over 23 to be included to enhance the quality of the competition, whilst protecting opportunities for developing athletes. This also enables the continuation of elite competition for NSL players who are returning from long term injury or pregnancy. It features nine teams; the eight NSL teams as well as Team Bath (who were not offered an NSL license in the relaunched league).

=== Winners ===
No grand final or finals series is currently held for the NXT Gen league. Consequently the champion team is the one with the number-one ranked position on the table at the end of the regular season. The list of winning teams is as follows:

- 2025: Loughborough Lightning
- 2026: London Mavericks
- 2027: TBD
