= 2025 Netball Super League squads =

The 2025 Netball Super League season was the twentieth season of the Netball Super League, the elite domestic netball competition in the United Kingdom, held from 14 March to 6 July 2025. Eight teams were involved.

The 2025 signing window gave all eight clubs the opportunity to make signings and finalise their squads before the season began. The signing window opened on Monday 1 July 2024 and clubs were given until 5pm on Friday 23 August 2024 to register 10 players. This is different than the 2024 season where each team could register 12 players plus 3 training partners. Also new to the 2025 season is the creation of the Under 23 competition (NXT Gen). Each Super League club also has a Under 23 team in the newly formed Under 23 competition from which they can draw Temporary Replacement Players. Permanent Replacement Players can be drawn from any squad in the league.

== Birmingham Panthers ==
=== Roster ===
2025 Birmingham Panthers roster
Players
Coaching staff

Nat.	Name	Position(s)	DoB	Height
(England)	Jasmine Brown	GK	26 November 2001	1.89 m (6 ft 2 in)
(South Africa)	Sigrid Burger (injured)	GS	23 February 1996	1.90 m (6 ft 3 in)
(Australia)	Gabrielle Coffey	GD, WD, GK	25 May 2000	1.86 m (6 ft 1 in)
(Wales)	Betsy Creak (vc)	GA, GS	10 August 1996	1.88 m (6 ft 2 in)
(England)	Ruth Hughes	WA, C	10 August 2003	1.65 m (5 ft 5 in)
(Northern Ireland)	Michelle Magee	GD, WD	13 January 2000	1.80 m (5 ft 11 in)
(England)	Gabriella Marshall (c) (injured)	C, WD	9 April 1996	1.74 m (5 ft 9 in)
(England)	Antonia Mitchell (TRP)	GS		–
(England)	Jessica Shaw	GA, C	17 April 1996	1.70 m (5 ft 7 in)
(Australia)	Gabrielle Sinclair	GA, GS	12 July 1993	1.76 m (5 ft 9 in)
(England)	Aliyah Zaranyika	WD, C	2 November 2001	1.73 m (5 ft 8 in)
(England)	Ellen Withington (TRP)	C		–

Head coach

- Jo Trip

Notes

- (c) – Captain
- (cc) – Co-captain
- (vc) – Vice-captain
- – Injury / maternity leave
- (TRP) – Temporary Replacement Player
Player profiles: Team website
Last updated: 29 March 2025

=== Internal Movements ===
Period	Name	From	To	Ref.
In Season	(England) Ellen Withington	(England) Birmingham Panthers (NXT Gen)	(England) Birmingham Panthers	

=== Transfers In ===
Period	Name	From	To	Ref.
Pre Season	(England) Jasmine Brown	(England) Severn Stars	(England) Birmingham Panthers	
Pre Season	(South Africa) Sigrid Burger	(England) Severn Stars	(England) Birmingham Panthers	
Pre Season	(Australia) Gabrielle Coffey	(Australia) Melbourne Vixens	(England) Birmingham Panthers	
Pre Season	(Wales) Betsy Creak	(England) Severn Stars	(England) Birmingham Panthers	
Pre Season	(England) Ruth Hughes	(England) Severn Stars (Training Partner)	(England) Birmingham Panthers	
Pre Season	(Northern Ireland) Michelle Magee	(England) Leeds Rhinos	(England) Birmingham Panthers	
Pre Season	(England) Gabriella Marshall	(England) Severn Stars	(England) Birmingham Panthers	
Pre Season	(England) Jessica Shaw	(England) Severn Stars	(England) Birmingham Panthers	
Pre Season	(Australia) Gabrielle Sinclair	(Australia) Melbourne Mavericks	(England) Birmingham Panthers	
Pre Season	(England) Aliyah Zaranyika	(England) Saracens Mavericks	(England) Birmingham Panthers	
In Season	(England) Antonia Mitchell	(England) Loughborough Lightning (NXT Gen)	(England) Birmingham Panthers	

=== Transfers Out ===
Period	Name	From	To	Ref.

== Cardiff Dragons ==
=== Roster ===
2025 Cardiff Dragons roster
Players
Coaching staff

Nat.	Name	Position(s)	DoB	Height
(England)	Celena Appleby-Prince (TRP)	GK	14 January 1996	1.86 m (6 ft 1 in)
(South Africa)	Khanyisa Chawane	WA, C, WD	14 January 1996	1.65 m (5 ft 5 in)
(Wales)	Chelsea Beard	GS, GA	24 November 1993	1.88 m (6 ft 2 in)
(Wales)	Bethan Dyke	WA, C	25 December 1994	1.64 m (5 ft 5 in)
(England)	Beth Ecuyer-Dale	C, WD, WA	6 August 1999	1.70 m (5 ft 7 in)
(Wales)	Alexandra Johnson	GD, GK, WD	26 September 2002	1.83 m (6 ft 0 in)
(England)	Elle McDonald (vc)	C, WA, WD	16 September 1994	1.75 m (5 ft 9 in)
(Wales)	Leah Middleton (vc) (injured)	GK, GD	7 April 1995	1.87 m (6 ft 2 in)
(Australia)	Jacqueline Newton (c)	GD, GK	14 February 1997	1.86 m (6 ft 1 in)
(Wales)	Georgia Rowe	GS	9 May 1995	1.95 m (6 ft 5 in)
(Wales)	Phillipa Yarranton	GA, WA, GS	28 November 2003	1.77 m (5 ft 10 in)

Head coach

- Reinga Bloxham

Assistant coach

- Sarah Lewis

Manager: Ceri Price
Physiotherapist: Clare Briers
Strength and conditioning: Pete Ashcroft

Notes

- (c) – Captain
- (cc) – Co-captain
- (vc) – Vice-captain
- – Injury / maternity leave
- (TRP) – Temporary Replacement Player
Player profiles: Team website
Last updated: 29 March 2025

=== Internal Movements ===
Period	Name	From	To	Ref.
Pre Season	(Wales) Lucy Howells	(Wales) Cardiff Dragons	(Wales) Cardiff Dragons (NXT Gen)	
Pre Season	(Wales) Nansi Kuti	(Wales) Cardiff Dragons	(Wales) Cardiff Dragons (NXT Gen)	
Pre Season	(Wales) Zoe Matthewman	(Wales) Cardiff Dragons (Training Partner)	(Wales) Cardiff Dragons (NXT Gen)	

=== Transfers In ===
Period	Name	From	To	Ref.
Pre Season	(Wales) Chelsea Beard	-	(Wales) Cardiff Dragons	
Pre Season	(Wales) Bethan Dyke	(England) Team Bath	(Wales) Cardiff Dragons	
Pre Season	(Wales) Alexandra Johnson	(England) Loughborough Lightning (Training Partner)	(Wales) Cardiff Dragons	
In Season	(England) Celena Appleby-Prince	(England) Loughborough Lightning (NXT Gen)	(Wales) Cardiff Dragons	

=== Transfers Out ===
Period	Name	From	To	Ref.
Pre Season	(Wales) Millie Carter	(Wales) Cardiff Dragons (Training Partner)	(England) Birmingham Panthers (NXT Gen)	
Pre Season	(Wales) Nia Jones	(Wales) Cardiff Dragons	Retired	
Pre Season	(Wales) Shona O’Dwyer	(Wales) Cardiff Dragons (Training Partner)	-	
Pre Season	(England) Hannah Passmore	(Wales) Cardiff Dragons	(England) London Pulse (NXT Gen)	
Pre Season	(England) Laura Rudland	(Wales) Cardiff Dragons	-	

== Leeds Rhinos ==
=== Roster ===
2025 Leeds Rhinos roster
Players
Coaching staff

Nat.	Name	Position(s)	DoB	Height
(England)	Ella Bowen	GD, WD, GK	1 January 2002	1.82 m (6 ft 0 in)
(England)	Bethany Brittain (c)	WA, C	9 May 1998	1.68 m (5 ft 6 in)
(England)	Ashleigh Dekker	C, WA	16 February 1999	1.81 m (5 ft 11 in)
(England)	Sophie Egbaran	GS, GA	4 January 2005	1.84 m (6 ft 0 in)
(England)	Rosie Harris (vc)	C, WD	22 February 1998	1.78 m (5 ft 10 in)
(England)	Jess Haynes	GD, WD, GK	13 June 2001	1.85 m (6 ft 1 in)
(England)	Cassie Howard	C, WD	12 December 2002	1.76 m (5 ft 9 in)
(England)	Harriet Jones	GA, GS, WA	30 October 2004	1.80 m (5 ft 11 in)
(England)	Geva Mentor (vc)	GK	17 September 1984	1.90 m (6 ft 3 in)
(Malawi)	Joyce Mvula (vc)	GS, GA	15 April 1994	1.81 m (5 ft 11 in)

Head coach

- Lauren Palmer

Assistant coach

- Maggie Birkinshaw

Manager: Gerry Plant
Physiotherapist: Jen Craven
Strength and conditioning: Sarah Whitehead

Notes

- (c) – Captain
- (cc) – Co-captain
- (vc) – Vice-captain
- – Injury / maternity leave
- (TRP) – Temporary Replacement Player
Player profiles: Team website
Last updated: 25 March 2025

=== Internal Movements ===
Period	Name	From	To	Ref.
Pre Season	(England) Amelia Veevers	(England) Leeds Rhinos (Training Partner)	(England) Leeds Rhinos (NXT Gen)	

=== Transfers In ===
Period	Name	From	To	Ref.
Pre Season	(England) Ella Bowen	(England) Manchester Thunder	(England) Leeds Rhinos	
Pre Season	(England) Bethany Brittain	(England) Surrey Storm	(England) Leeds Rhinos	
Pre Season	(England) Ashleigh Dekker	(England) Severn Stars	(England) Leeds Rhinos	
Pre Season	(England) Sophie Egbaran	(England) Saracens Mavericks	(England) Leeds Rhinos	
Pre Season	(England) Rosie Harris	(England) Surrey Storm	(England) Leeds Rhinos	
Pre Season	(England) Jess Haynes	(England) Severn Stars (Training Partner)	(England) Leeds Rhinos	

=== Transfers Out ===
Period	Name	From	To	Ref.
Pre Season	(England) Amy Braithwaite	(England) Leeds Rhinos	(England) Nottingham Forest (NXT Gen)	
Pre Season	(Australia) Zoe Davies	(England) Leeds Rhinos	(Australia) Bendigo Strikers	
Pre Season	(Wales) Celyn Emanuel	(England) Leeds Rhinos	-	
Pre Season	(England) Amelia Hall	(England) Leeds Rhinos	(England) London Mavericks	
Pre Season	(England) Annie James	(England) Leeds Rhinos (Training Partner)	-	
Pre Season	(England) Paige Kindred	(England) Leeds Rhinos (Training Partner)	-	
Pre Season	(Scotland) Sarah MacPhail	(England) Leeds Rhinos	-	
Pre Season	(Northern Ireland) Emma Magee	(England) Leeds Rhinos	-	
Pre Season	(Northern Ireland) Michelle Magee	(England) Leeds Rhinos	(England) Birmingham Panthers	
Pre Season	(Northern Ireland) Caroline O'Hanlon	(England) Leeds Rhinos	-	

== London Mavericks ==
=== Roster ===
2025 London Mavericks roster
Players
Coaching staff

Nat.	Name	Position(s)	DoB	Height
(Australia)	Emily Andrew	GS, GA	28 February 2003	1.91 m (6 ft 3 in)
(Australia)	Chelsea Blackman (injured)	GD, WD	29 September 2000	1.85 m (6 ft 1 in)
(Australia)	Jemma Donoghue (TRP)	GD	10 June 2001	1.83 m (6 ft 0 in)
(Scotland)	Cerys Finn (TRP)	GK		1.84 m (6 ft 0 in)
(England)	Amelia Hall	GA, WA	24 April 1999	1.71 m (5 ft 7 in)
(England)	Amy Hepworth-Wain (TRP)	WD, C	1 November 1993	1.78 m (5 ft 10 in)
(England)	Suzie Liverseidge	WA, C	1 June 2001	1.76 m (5 ft 9 in)
(England)	Vicki Oyesola (vc) (injured)	GD, WD, GK	16 January 1998	1.79 m (5 ft 10 in)
(England)	Isabella Phillips	WD, GD, C	9 April 2006	1.79 m (5 ft 10 in)
(England)	Razia Quashie	GK	16 September 1997	1.82 m (6 ft 0 in)
(England)	Ellie Rattu (c)	C, WD	4 April 2000	1.77 m (5 ft 10 in)
(England)	Kira Rothwell	GA, GS	29 October 2000	1.78 m (5 ft 10 in)
(England)	Emma Thacker (vc)	GA, WA, GS	22 August 2003	1.89 m (6 ft 2 in)

Head coach

- Camilla Buchanan

Notes

- (c) – Captain
- (cc) – Co-captain
- (vc) – Vice-captain
- – Injury / maternity leave
- (TRP) – Temporary Replacement Player
Player profiles: Team website
Last updated: 26 March 2025

=== Internal Movements ===
Period	Name	From	To	Ref.
Pre Season	(Scotland) Cerys Finn	(England) London Mavericks (NXT Gen)	(England) London Mavericks	
Pre Season	(England) Azara Wilmot	(England) Saracens Mavericks (Training Partner)	(England) London Mavericks (NXT Gen)	
In Season	(England) Amy Hepworth-Wain	(England) London Mavericks (NXT Gen)	(England) London Mavericks	

=== Transfers In ===
Period	Name	From	To	Ref.
Pre Season	(Australia) Emily Andrew	(Australia) Melbourne Vixens	(England) London Mavericks	
Pre Season	(Australia) Chelsea Blackman	(Australia) Adelaide Thunderbirds	(England) London Mavericks	
Pre Season	(England) Amelia Hall	(England) Leeds Rhinos	(England) London Mavericks	
Pre Season	(England) Suzie Liverseidge	(England) Severn Stars	(England) London Mavericks	
Pre Season	(England) Isabella Phillips	(England) London Pulse	(England) London Mavericks	
In Season	(Australia) Jemma Donoghue	(Australia) New South Wales Swifts (Training Partner)	(England) London Mavericks	

=== Transfers Out ===
Period	Name	From	To	Ref.
Pre Season	(England) Peace Akinyemi	(England) Saracens Mavericks	-	
Pre Season	(England) Britney Clarke	(England) Saracens Mavericks	-	
Pre Season	(Scotland) Charlotte Dunkley	(England) Saracens Mavericks (Training Partner)	(England) London Pulse (NXT Gen)	
Pre Season	(Scotland) Anna Fairclough	(England) Saracens Mavericks (Training Partner)	(England) Nottingham Forest (NXT Gen)	
Pre Season	(England) Jodie Gibson	(England) Saracens Mavericks	(England) Loughborough Lightning	
Pre Season	(England) Georgia Lees	(England) Saracens Mavericks	Retired	
Pre Season	(England) Indya Masser	(England) Saracens Mavericks	(England) Birmingham Panthers (NXT Gen)	
Pre Season	(England) Gracie Smith	(England) Saracens Mavericks (Training Partner)	(England) London Pulse	
Pre Season	(South Africa) Ine-Marí Venter	(England) Saracens Mavericks	-	
Pre Season	(England) Aliyah Zaranyika	(England) Saracens Mavericks	(England) Birmingham Panthers	

== London Pulse ==
=== Roster ===
2025 London Pulse roster
Players
Coaching staff

Nat.	Name	Position(s)	DoB	Height
(England)	Halimat Adio (vc)	GD, GK	27 January 1998	1.83 m (6 ft 0 in)
(South Africa)	Nicholé Breedt	WA, GA	3 May 1997	1.77 m (5 ft 10 in)
(England)	Darcie Everitt	GD, GK, WD	6 February 2006	1.87 m (6 ft 2 in)
(England)	Zara Everitt (c)	GD, WD	5 May 2000	1.82 m (6 ft 0 in)
(England)	Funmi Fadoju	GD, GK, WD	15 August 2002	1.76 m (5 ft 9 in)
(England)	Sophie Kelly	GA, WA, GS	28 November 2003	1.82 m (6 ft 0 in)
(Australia)	Tyler Orr	C, WD, WA	21 January 2000	1.79 m (5 ft 10 in)
(England)	Alicia Scholes	WA, C	8 May 2001	1.63 m (5 ft 4 in)
(England)	Gracie Smith	WD, C	6 October 2008	1.84 m (6 ft 0 in)
(England)	Olivia Tchine	GS, GA	22 November 2000	1.90 m (6 ft 3 in)

Head coach

- Sam Bird

Notes

- (c) – Captain
- (cc) – Co-captain
- (vc) – Vice-captain
- – Injury / maternity leave
- (TRP) – Temporary Replacement Player
Player profiles: Team website
Last updated: 25 March 2025

=== Internal Movements ===
Period	Name	From	To	Ref.
Pre Season	(England) Jada Autumn	(England) London Pulse (Training Partner)	(England) London Pulse (NXT Gen)	
Pre Season	(England) Isla May	(England) London Pulse (Training Partner)	(England) London Pulse (NXT Gen)	

=== Transfers In ===
Period	Name	From	To	Ref.
Pre Season	(England) Sophie Kelly	(England) Team Bath	(England) London Pulse	
Pre Season	(Australia) Tyler Orr	(Australia) Adelaide Thunderbirds	(England) London Pulse	
Pre Season	(England) Gracie Smith	(England) Saracens Mavericks (Training Partner)	(England) London Pulse	

=== Transfers Out ===
Period	Name	From	To	Ref.
Pre Season	(England) Jade Clarke	(England) London Pulse	(England) Manchester Thunder (NXT Gen)	
Pre Season	(England) Chloe Essam	(England) London Pulse (Training Partner)	(England) Birmingham Panthers (NXT Gen)	
Pre Season	(Jamaica) Brie Grierson	(England) London Pulse	(England) Nottingham Forest	
Pre Season	(Trinidad and Tobago) Jeresia McEachrane	(England) London Pulse	-	
Pre Season	(England) Berri Neil	(England) London Pulse	(England) Loughborough Lightning	
Pre Season	(England) Isabella Phillips	(England) London Pulse	(England) London Mavericks	

== Loughborough Lightning ==
=== Roster ===
2025 Loughborough Lightning roster
Players
Coaching staff

Nat.	Name	Position(s)	DoB	Height
(England)	Bella Baylis	C, WA	5 November 2003	1.68 m (5 ft 6 in)
(England)	Ella Clark	GA, GS	8 February 1992	1.89 m (6 ft 2 in)
(England)	Beth Cobden (vc)	WD, C	3 February 1993	1.77 m (5 ft 10 in)
(England)	Jodie Gibson	GD, GK, WD	30 October 1992	1.78 m (5 ft 10 in)
(England)	Alice Harvey	GK, GD	4 March 2001	1.90 m (6 ft 3 in)
(England)	Hannah Joseph (vc)	WA, C	8 February 1994	1.75 m (5 ft 9 in)
(England)	Berri Neil	GA, GS	12 February 2003	1.83 m (6 ft 0 in)
(England)	Natalie Panagarry (c)	C, WD	27 December 1990	1.70 m (5 ft 7 in)
(South Africa)	Shadine van der Merwe	GD, GK	25 November 1992	1.80 m (5 ft 11 in)
(Trinidad and Tobago)	Samantha Wallace-Joseph	GS, GA	16 January 1994	1.93 m (6 ft 4 in)

Head coach

- Victoria Burgess

Notes

- (c) – Captain
- (cc) – Co-captain
- (vc) – Vice-captain
- – Injury / maternity leave
- (TRP) – Temporary Replacement Player
Player profiles: Team website
Last updated: 23 March 2025

=== Internal Movements ===
Period	Name	From	To	Ref.
Pre Season	(England) Georgie Brock-Taylor	(England) Loughborough Lightning (Training Partner)	(England) Loughborough Lightning (NXT Gen)	
Pre Season	(Scotland) Niamh McCall	(England) Loughborough Lightning	(England) Loughborough Lightning (NXT Gen)	

=== Transfers In ===
Period	Name	From	To	Ref.
Pre Season	(England) Berri Neil	(England) London Pulse	(England) Loughborough Lightning	
Pre Season	(England) Jodie Gibson	(England) Saracens Mavericks	(England) Loughborough Lightning	
Pre Season	(Trinidad and Tobago) Samantha Wallace-Joseph	(Australia) New South Wales Swifts	(England) Loughborough Lightning	
Pre Season	(South Africa) Shadine van der Merwe	(England) Manchester Thunder	(England) Loughborough Lightning	

=== Transfers Out ===
Period	Name	From	To	Ref.
Pre Season	(Uganda) Mary Cholhok Nuba	(England) Loughborough Lightning	(Australia) Queensland Firebirds	
Pre Season	(Jamaica) Rhea Dixon	(England) Loughborough Lightning	(England) Nottingham Forest	
Pre Season	(England) Freya Henshall	(England) Loughborough Lightning (Training Partner)	(England) Nottingham Forest	
Pre Season	(Wales) Alexandra Johnson	(England) Loughborough Lightning (Training Partner)	(Wales) Cardiff Dragons	
Pre Season	(England) Jade Popoola	(England) Loughborough Lightning	(England) London Mavericks (NXT Gen)	
Pre Season	(England) Annabel Roddy	(England) Loughborough Lightning	(England) Nottingham Forest (NXT Gen)	
Pre Season	(South Africa) Nicola Smith	(England) Loughborough Lightning	(England) Manchester Thunder	

== Manchester Thunder ==
=== Roster ===
2025 Manchester Thunder roster
Players
Coaching staff

Nat.	Name	Position(s)	DoB	Height
(England)	Amy Carter (c)	C, WD, WA	28 October 1998	1.75 m (5 ft 9 in)
(England)	Lucy Herdman (TRP)	GA, GS, GK	16 March 1996	1.88 m (6 ft 2 in)
(England)	Josie Huckle (vc)	GK, GD	24 September 1991	1.88 m (6 ft 2 in)
(England)	Elia McCormick	GD, GK, WD	25 November 1999	1.84 m (6 ft 0 in)
(England)	Taylor McKevitt (vc)	WD, C	16 December 1997	1.70 m (5 ft 7 in)
(England)	Shannon Mahlik (TRP)	GA, GS	2008	1.81 m (5 ft 11 in)
(England)	Indya Masser (TRP)	WA, C	23 April 2002	1.68 m (5 ft 6 in)
(England)	Natalie Metcalf	WA, GA	9 December 1992	1.74 m (5 ft 9 in)
(England)	Lois Pearson (injured)	GA, WA	20 September 1999	1.76 m (5 ft 9 in)
(England)	Emma Rayner	WA, C	7 June 2002	1.69 m (5 ft 7 in)
(England)	Paige Reed (injured)	GA, GS	9 July 1997	1.78 m (5 ft 10 in)
(South Africa)	Ané Retief (TRP)	GD, GK	9 September 1998	1.83 m (6 ft 0 in)
(South Africa)	Nicola Smith (injured)	GD, GK	25 April 2000	1.89 m (6 ft 2 in)
(South Africa)	Elmeré van der Berg	GS, GA	9 April 2001	1.91 m (6 ft 3 in)
(England)	Anya Williams (TRP)	GA, GS	19 October 2006	1.81 m (5 ft 11 in)

Head coach

- Karen Greig

Assistant coach

- Laura Malcolm

Manager: Phil Thomas

Notes

- (c) – Captain
- (cc) – Co-captain
- (vc) – Vice-captain
- – Injury / maternity leave
- (TRP) – Temporary Replacement Player
Player profiles: Team website
Last updated: 23 March 2025

=== Internal Movements ===
Period	Name	From	To	Ref.
Pre Season	(England) Lucy Herdman	(England) Manchester Thunder (NXT Gen)	(England) Manchester Thunder	
Pre Season	(England) Shannon Mahlik	(England) Manchester Thunder (NXT Gen)	(England) Manchester Thunder	
Pre Season	(England) Elia McCormick	(England) Manchester Thunder (Training Partner)	(England) Manchester Thunder	
Pre Season	(England) Emma Rayner	(England) Manchester Thunder (Training Partner)	(England) Manchester Thunder	
Pre Season	(England) Yasmin Roebuck	(England) Manchester Thunder (Training Partner)	(England) Manchester Thunder (NXT Gen)	
Pre Season	(England) Anya Williams	(England) Manchester Thunder (NXT Gen)	(England) Manchester Thunder	

=== Transfers In ===
Period	Name	From	To	Ref.
Pre Season	(England) Indya Masser	(England) Birmingham Panthers (NXT Gen)	(England) Manchester Thunder	
Pre Season	(South Africa) Ané Retief	(South Africa) Free State Crinums	(England) Manchester Thunder	
Pre Season	(South Africa) Nicola Smith	(England) Loughborough Lightning	(England) Manchester Thunder	

=== Transfers Out ===
Period	Name	From	To	Ref.
Pre Season	(England) Imogen Allison	(England) Manchester Thunder	(Australia) Queensland Firebirds	
Pre Season	(England) Kerry Almond	(England) Manchester Thunder	Retired	
Pre Season	(England) Ella Bowen	(England) Manchester Thunder	(England) Leeds Rhinos	
Pre Season	(England) Laura Malcolm	(England) Manchester Thunder (Training Partner)	Retired	
Pre Season	(South Africa) Shadine van der Merwe	(England) Manchester Thunder	(England) Loughborough Lightning	

== Nottingham Forest ==
=== Roster ===
2025 Nottingham Forest roster
Players
Coaching staff

Nat.	Name	Position(s)	DoB	Height
(Scotland)	Iona Christian	C, WA	22 December 1997	1.67 m (5 ft 6 in)
(Northern Ireland)	Niamh Cooper (c)	C, WD	29 July 1992	1.76 m (5 ft 9 in)
(Jamaica)	Rhea Dixon	GA, GS, WA	5 November 1997	1.80 m (5 ft 11 in)
(Jamaica)	Brie Grierson	WA, GA	8 April 1997	1.75 m (5 ft 9 in)
(England)	Freya Henshall	GS, GA	8 March 2004	1.86 m (6 ft 1 in)
(Uganda)	Faridah Kadondi	GK, GD	9 November 1998	1.76 m (5 ft 9 in)
(Scotland)	Hannah Leighton	C, WD	1 August 1998	1.77 m (5 ft 10 in)
(England)	Natasha Pavelin (vc)	GD, WD	22 April 1998	1.85 m (6 ft 1 in)
(England)	Jayda Pechová	GK, GD	21 August 2004	1.83 m (6 ft 0 in)
(South Africa)	Rolene Streutker	GS	20 October 2000	1.86 m (6 ft 1 in)

Head coach

- Chelsea Pitman

Assistant coach

- Sheonah Forbes

Manager: Sian Foley

Notes

- (c) – Captain
- (cc) – Co-captain
- (vc) – Vice-captain
- – Injury / maternity leave
- (TRP) – Temporary Replacement Player
Player profiles: Team website
Last updated: 26 March 2025

=== Internal Movements ===
Period	Name	From	To	Ref.

=== Transfers In ===
Period	Name	From	To	Ref.
Pre Season	(Scotland) Iona Christian	(Scotland) Strathclyde Sirens	(England) Nottingham Forest	
Pre Season	(Northern Ireland) Niamh Cooper	(England) Severn Stars	(England) Nottingham Forest	
Pre Season	(Jamaica) Rhea Dixon	(England) Loughborough Lightning	(England) Nottingham Forest	
Pre Season	(Jamaica) Brie Grierson	(England) London Pulse	(England) Nottingham Forest	
Pre Season	(England) Freya Henshall	(England) Loughborough Lightning (Training Partner)	(England) Nottingham Forest	
Pre Season	(Uganda) Faridah Kadondi	(Uganda) KCCA Leopards	(England) Nottingham Forest	
Pre Season	(Scotland) Hannah Leighton	(Scotland) Strathclyde Sirens	(England) Nottingham Forest	
Pre Season	(England) Natasha Pavelin	(England) Team Bath	(England) Nottingham Forest	
Pre Season	(England) Jayda Pechová	(England) Team Bath	(England) Nottingham Forest	
Pre Season	(South Africa) Rolene Streutker	(Australia) Melbourne Mavericks	(England) Nottingham Forest	

=== Transfers Out ===
Period	Name	From	To	Ref.
