= Netball Super League End of Season Award Winners =

Netball Super League End of Season Award Winners. The following is a list of Netball Super League award winners.

== Players Player of the Season ==
Season	Winner	Team	Ref
2007–08			
2008–09			
2009–10			
2011			
2012			
2013			
2014			
2015			
2016			
2017	(Uganda) Peace Proscovia	Surrey Storm	
2018	(Jamaica) Shamera Sterling	Loughborough Lightning	
2019			
2020			
2021	(Malawi) Towera Vinkhumbo	Strathclyde Sirens	
2022	(England) Eleanor Cardwell	Manchester Thunder	
2023	(England) Vicki Oyesola	Leeds Rhinos Netball	
2024	(England) Lois Pearson	Manchester Thunder	
2025	(South Africa) Rolene Streutker	Nottingham Forest Netball	
2026	(Trinidad and Tobago) Samantha Wallace-Joseph	Loughborough Lightning	

== Player of the Season ==
Not awarded post 2022 season

Season	Winner	Team	Ref
2007–08	(England) Pamela Cookey	Team Bath	
2008–09	(England) Pamela Cookey	Team Bath	
2009–10	(England) Pamela Cookey	Team Bath	
2011	(England) Stacey Francis	Team Bath	
2012			
2013	(England) Stacey Francis	Team Bath	
2014	(England) Layla Guscoth	Hertfordshire Mavericks	
2015	(England) Natalie Haythornthwaite	Yorkshire Jets	
2016	(Trinidad and Tobago) Samantha Wallace	Hertfordshire Mavericks	
2017	(Uganda) Peace Proscovia	Surrey Storm	
2018	(Jamaica) Shamera Sterling	Loughborough Lightning	
2019	(England) Rachel Dunn	Wasps	
2020	^{(Note 1)}		
2021	(England) Beth Cobden	Loughborough Lightning	
2022	(England) Layla Guscoth	Team Bath	

Notes

- ^1 The 2020 season was not completed due to the COVID-19 pandemic.

== Young Player of the Season ==
Season	Winner	Team	Ref
2007–08			
2008–09			
2009–10			
2011			
2012			
2013			
2014			
2015			
2016			
2017	(England) Vicki Oyesola	Loughborough Lightning	
2018	(England) Amy Carter	Manchester Thunder	
2018	(England) George Fisher	Wasps Netball	
2019	(England) Sophie Drakeford-Lewis	Team Bath	
2020			
2021	(England) Funmi Fadoju	London Pulse	
2022	(England) Funmi Fadoju	London Pulse	
2023	(England) Berri Neil	London Pulse	
2024	(England) Izzi Phillips	London Pulse	
2025	(England) Jayda Pechova	Nottingham Forest Netball	
2026	(England) Jayda Pechova	Nottingham Forest Netball	

== Coach of the Year ==
Season	Winner	Team	Ref
2007–08			
2008–09			
2009–10			
2011			
2012			
2013			
2014			
2015			
2016			
2017	(England) Karen Atkinson	Loughborough Lightning	
2018	(England) Karen Greig	Manchester Thunder	
2019			
2020			
2021	(England) Karen Atkinson	Strathclyde Sirens	
2022	(England) Karen Greig	Manchester Thunder	
2023	(New Zealand) Jo Trip	Severn Stars	
2024	(New Zealand) Jo Trip	Severn Stars	
2025	(England) Camilla Buchanan	London Mavericks	
2026	(New Zealand) Reinga Bloxham	Cardiff Dragons	

== Fans Player of the Season ==
Season	Winner	Team	Ref
2007–08	Not Awarded		
2008–09	Not Awarded		
2009–10	Not Awarded		
2011	Not Awarded		
2012	Not Awarded		
2013	Not Awarded		
2014	Not Awarded		
2015	Not Awarded		
2016	Not Awarded		
2017	Not Awarded		
2018	Not Awarded		
2019	Joyce Mvula	Manchester Thunder	
2020			
2021	Donnell Wallam	Leeds Rhinos Netball	
2022	(England) Eleanor Cardwell	Manchester Thunder	
2023	Jo Trip	Severn Stars	
2024	(England) Funmi Fadoju	London Pulse	
2025	(England) Funmi Fadoju	London Pulse	
2026	(England) Jayda Pechova	Nottingham Forest Netball	

== All Star VII ==
Season	Position	Winner	Team	Ref
2007–08				
2008–09				
2009–10				
2011				
2012				
2013				
2014				
2015				
2016	GS	(England) Rachel Dunn	Surrey Storm	
2016	GA	(England) Pamela Cookey	Surrey Storm	
2016	WA	(England) Natalie Haythornthwaite	Manchester Thunder	
2016	C	(England) Sara Bayman	Manchester Thunder	
2016	WD	(England) Amy Flanagan	Surrey Storm	
2016	GD	(England) Layla Guscoth	Hertfordshire Mavericks	
2016	GK	(England) Ama Agbeze	Loughborough Lightning	
2017	GS	(Uganda) Peace Proscovia	Surrey Storm	
2017	GA	(England) Kathryn Turner	Manchester Thunder	
2017	WA	(New Zealand) Liana Leota	Manchester Thunder	
2017	C	(South Africa) Bongiwe Msomi	Wasps Netball	
2017	WD	(England) Beth Cobden	Loughborough Lightning	
2017	GD	(England) Layla Guscoth	Team Bath	
2017	GK	(England) Nicole Aiken Pinnock	Strathclyde Sirens	
2018	GS	(Uganda) Peace Proscovia	Surrey Storm	
2018	GA	(England) Kathryn Turner	Manchester Thunder	
2018	WA	(New Zealand) Liana Leota	Manchester Thunder	
2018	C	(England) Jade Clarke	Wasps Netball	
2018	WD	(England) Beth Cobden	Loughborough Lightning	
2018	GD	(England) Layla Guscoth	Team Bath	
2018	GK	(Jamaica) Shamera Sterling	Loughborough Lightning	
2019	GS	(England) Rachel Dunn	Wasps Netball	
2019	GA	(Trinidad and Tobago) Kalifa McCollin	Celtic Dragons	
2019	WA	(New Zealand) Liana Leota	Manchester Thunder	
2019	C	(England) Serena Guthrie	Team Bath	
2019	WD	(England) Natalie Panagarry	Loughborough Lightning	
2019	GD	(New Zealand) Jo Trip	Saracens Mavericks	
2019	GK	(England) Sam Cook	Severn Stars	
2020				
2021	GS	(Australia) Kim Borger	Team Bath	
2021	GA	(England) Eleanor Cardwell	Manchester Thunder	
2021	WA	(South Africa) Brie Grierson	Leeds Rhinos Netball	
2021	C	(England) Serena Guthrie	Team Bath	
2021	WD	(England) Laura Malcolm	Manchester Thunder	
2021	GD	(England) Layla Guscoth	Team Bath	
2021	GK	(Malawi) Towera Vinkhumbo	Strathclyde Sirens	
2022	GS	(Uganda) Peace Proscovia	Surrey Storm	
2022	GA	(England) Eleanor Cardwell	Manchester Thunder	
2022	WA	(England) Natalie Metcalf	Manchester Thunder	
2022	C	(England) Laura Malcolm	Manchester Thunder	
2022	WD	(England) Beth Cobden	Loughborough Lightning	
2022	GD	(England) Layla Guscoth	Team Bath	
2022	GK	(South Africa) Phumza Maweni	Team Bath	
2023	GS	(Uganda) Mary Cholhok Nuba	Loughborough Lightning	
2023	GA	(England) Berri Neil	London Pulse	
2023	WA	(England) Natalie Metcalf	Manchester Thunder	
2023	C	(England) Jade Clarke	London Pulse	
2023	WD	(England) Amy Flanagan	Surrey Storm	
2023	GD	(England) Fran Williams	Loughborough Lightning	
2023	GK	(England) Vicki Oyesola	Leeds Rhinos Netball	
2024	GS	(Uganda) Mary Cholhok Nuba	Loughborough Lightning	
2024	GA	(England) Lois Pearson	Manchester Thunder	
2024	WA	(England) Jess Shaw	Severn Stars	
2024	C	(England) Natalie Panagarry	Loughborough Lightning	
2024	WD	(England) Imogen Allison	Manchester Thunder	
2024	GD	(England) Funmi Fadoju	London Pulse	
2024	GK	(England) Jas Brown	Severn Stars	
2025	GS	(South Africa) Rolene Streutker	Nottingham Forest Netball	
2025	GA	(England) Berri Neil	Loughborough Lightning	
2025	WA	(England) Suzie Liverseidge	London Mavericks	
2025	C	(England) Amy Carter	Manchester Thunder	
2025	WD	(England) Cassie Howard	Leeds Rhinos Netball	
2025	GD	(England) Funmi Fadoju	London Pulse	
2025	GK	(England) Jas Brown	Birmingham Panthers	
2026	GS	(Trinidad and Tobago) Samantha Wallace-Joseph	Loughborough Lightning	
2026	GA	(England) Ella Clark	Loughborough Lightning	
2026	WA	(England) Alicia Scholes	London Pulse	
2026	C	(Scotland) Iona Christian	Nottingham Forest Netball	
2026	WD	(England) Taylor McKevitt	Manchester Thunder	
2026	GD	(England) Jacqui Newton	Cardiff Dragons	
2026	GK	(England) Jayda Pechova	Nottingham Forest Netball	

== Gilbert Top Scorer ==
Season	Winner	Team	Ref
2007–08			
2008–09			
2009–10			
2011			
2012			
2013			
2014			
2015			
2016			
2017			
2018	(Uganda) Peace Proscovia	Surrey Storm	
2019			
2020			
2021	(Uganda) Mary Cholhok Nuba	Loughborough Lightning	
2022	(Uganda) Peace Proscovia	Surrey Storm	
2023	(Uganda) Mary Cholhok Nuba	Loughborough Lightning	
2024	(Uganda) Mary Cholhok Nuba	Loughborough Lightning	
2025	(South Africa) Rolene Streutker	Nottingham Forest Netball	
2026	(Trinidad and Tobago) Samantha Wallace-Joseph	Loughborough Lightning	

== Super Shooter ==
Season	Winner	Team	Ref
2025	(South Africa) Rolene Streutker	Nottingham Forest Netball	
2026	(Trinidad and Tobago) Samantha Wallace-Joseph	Loughborough Lightning	

== Umpire of the Year ==
Season	Winner	Ref
2007–08		
2008–09		
2009–10		
2011		
2012		
2013		
2014		
2015		
2016		
2017	(England) Gary Burgess	
2018	Louise Travis	
2019		
2020		
2021	Louise Travis	
2022		
2023	(England) Gary Burgess	
2024	(England) Gary Burgess	
2025	(England) Gary Burgess	
2026	(England) Gary Burgess	

== Assessors Award ==
Season	Winner	Ref
2024	Emma Parker	
2025	Louise Cole	
2026	(England) Alison Harrison	
