= 2024 Netball Super League season =

British netball season

- League: Netball Super League
- Sport: Netball
- Duration: 17 February – 29 June 2024
- Teams: 10
- TV partner(s): Sky Sports & BBC

Regular Season
- Season MVP: Lois Pearson
- Top scorer: Mary Cholhok

Grand Finals
- Date: 29 June 2024
- Venue: Resorts World Arena
- Champions: Loughborough Lightning
- Runners-up: Manchester Thunder

Seasons
- ← 2023 2025 →

The 2024 Netball Super League season was the nineteenth season of the Netball Super League, the elite domestic netball competition in the United Kingdom. Loughborough Lightning were the defending champions, as they won the 2023 Grand final. The season began on 17 February and ended with the Grand Final on 29 June.

Loughborough Lightning won the competition, beating Manchester Thunder in the final to claim their second consecutive and third Super League title in four years.

== Format ==
The season featured 10 teams and was the last using this format before relaunching as a professional 8 team league in 2025. Fixtures were played home and away across 18 rounds before the top four progressed to the semi-finals. The first round of fixtures were all held at the Motorpoint Arena Nottingham.

It would be the final Netball Super League season to feature Severn Stars, Strathclyde Sirens, Surrey Storm and Team Bath.

== Teams ==
Team	Home court(s)	Coach	Captain(s)	Ref.
Cardiff Dragons	Cardiff City House of Sport; Utilita Arena Cardiff	Jill McIntosh	Nia Jones (c); Laura Rudland (vc)	
Leeds Rhinos	Canon Medical Arena; Huddersfield University; Allam Sport Centre; English Institute of Sport, Sheffield; First Direct Arena	Liana Leota	Geva Mentor (c); Michelle Magee (vc)	
London Pulse	Copper Box Arena	Sam Bird	Zara Everitt (c); Jade Clarke (vc); Olivia Tchine (vc)	
Loughborough Lightning	Sir David Wallace Sports Hall	Victoria Burgess	Natalie Panagarry (c)	
Manchester Thunder	Belle Vue Sports Village; AO Arena	Karen Greig	Natalie Metcalf (c); Kerry Almond (vc); Shadine van der Merwe (vc)	
Saracens Mavericks	Hertfordshire Sports Village; OVO Arena Wembley	Camilla Buchanan	Jodie Gibson (c); Georgia Lees (vc)	
Severn Stars	University of Worcester Arena	Jo Trip	Gabriella Marshall (c); Niamh Cooper (vc)	
Strathclyde Sirens	Emirates Arena	Lesley MacDonald	Emily Nicholl (c); Hannah Williams (vc)	
Surrey Storm	Surrey Sports Park	Mikki Austin	Amy Flanagan (c); Bethany Dix (vc); Sophie Drakeford-Lewis (vc)	
Team Bath	Team Bath Arena	Asha Francis	Bethan Dyke (c); Kirsty Harris (vc); Lisa Putt (vc)	

== Transfers ==
As of 17 February 2024

For the 2024 season, the signing window opened on Monday 19 June 2023 and clubs were given until 5pm on Friday 14 July 2023 to register a minimum of 10 of their registered 12 players. Any remaining registrations (a maximum of 2 Registered Players and up to 3 Training Partners) must have been registered by the deadline of 5pm on 25 August 2023.

The following table is a list of players who moved clubs into or out of the Netball Superleague, or were elevated to a permanent position in the senior team during the off-season. It does not include contracted players who were re-signed by their original Netball Superleague clubs.

2024 Netball Superleague Transfers
Name	From	To
Bella Baylis	(England) Loughborough Lightning (Training Partner)	(England) Loughborough Lightning
Georgie Brock-Taylor	(England) Loughborough Lightning (Pathway)	(England) Loughborough Lightning (Training Partner)
Ella Clark	Injured	(England) Loughborough Lightning
Freya Hershall	(England) London Pulse (Training Partner)	(England) Loughborough Lightning (Training Partner)
Niamh McCall	(Scotland) Strathclyde Sirens	(England) Loughborough Lightning
Jade Popoola	(England) London Pulse (Training Partner)	(England) Loughborough Lightning
Annabel Roddy	(Wales) Cardiff Dragons	(England) Loughborough Lightning
Nicola Smith	(England) Leeds Rhinos	(England) Loughborough Lightning
Molly Hole	(England) Loughborough Lightning (Training Partner)	-
Suzie Liverseidge	(England) Loughborough Lightning	(England) Severn Stars
Clara Miles	(England) Loughborough Lightning (Training Partner)	-
Lauren Nicholls	(England) Loughborough Lightning (Training Partner)	-
Jasmine Odeogberin	(England) Loughborough Lightning	-
Emma Thacker	(England) Loughborough Lightning	(England) Saracens Mavericks
Francesca Williams	(England) Loughborough Lightning	(Australia) West Coast Fever
Hannah Williams	(England) Loughborough Lightning	(Scotland) Strathclyde Sirens
Zanele Vimbela	(England) Loughborough Lightning	(South Africa) Gauteng Jaguars
Jada Autumn	(England) London Pulse (Pathway)	(England) London Pulse (Training Partner)
Chloe Essam	(England) Severn Stars (Training Partner)	(England) London Pulse (Training Partner)
Darcie Everitt	(England) London Pulse (Training Partner)	(England) London Pulse
Brie Grierson	(England) Leeds Rhinos	(England) London Pulse
Isla May	(England) London Pulse (Pathway)	(England) London Pulse (Training Partner)
Jeresia McEachrane	(Trinidad and Tobago) TT Defence Force	(England) London Pulse
Isabella Phillips	(England) London Pulse (Pathway)	(England) London Pulse
Nichole Taljaard	(South Africa) Southern Stings	(England) London Pulse
Ashleigh Dekker	(England) London Pulse	(England) Severn Stars
Lindsay Keable	(England) London Pulse	Retired
Sacha McDonald	(England) London Pulse	(Australia) Casey Demons Netball
Chelsea Pitman	(England) London Pulse	(Australia) Giants Netball
Ellie Rattu	(England) London Pulse	(England) Saracens Mavericks
Imogen Allison	(England) Team Bath	(England) Manchester Thunder
Laura Malcolm	(New Zealand) Mainland Tactix	(England) Manchester Thunder (Training Partner)
Emma Rayner	(England) Manchester Thunder (Pathway)	(England) Manchester Thunder (Training Partner)
Paige Reed	(England) Leeds Rhinos	(England) Manchester Thunder
Elmeré van der Berg	(England) Leeds Rhinos	(England) Manchester Thunder
Anya Williams	(England) Manchester Thunder (Pathway)	(England) Manchester Thunder
Iona Christian	(England) Manchester Thunder	(Scotland) Strathclyde Sirens
Amy Clinton	(England) Manchester Thunder	-
Yomi Eza-Wilson	(England) Manchester Thunder (Training Partner)	-
Harriet Jones	(England) Manchester Thunder (Training Partner)	(England) Leeds Rhinos
Elia McCormick	(England) Manchester Thunder	(England) Manchester Thunder (Training Partner)
Ruby Parker	(England) Manchester Thunder (Training Partner)	Injured
Lenize Potgieter	(England) Manchester Thunder	Injured
Libby Burgess	-	(England) Surrey Storm (Training Partner)
Bethany Dix	(Scotland) Strathclyde Sirens	(England) Surrey Storm
Rachel Fee	(England) Severn Stars (Training Partner)	(England) Surrey Storm
Leah Goss	-	(England) Surrey Storm
Ellie Harding	-	(England) Surrey Storm (Training Partner)
Ellie Gibbons	(England) Surrey Storm (Training Partner)	(England) Surrey Storm
Amy Howell	(England) British Army Netball	(England) Surrey Storm
Charlotte Masters	(England) Surrey Storm (Pathway)	(England) Surrey Storm (Training Partner)
Haniisha Muhameed	(Uganda) KCCA Netball	(England) Surrey Storm
Anya Wood	Break	(England) Surrey Storm
Yasmin Brookes	(England) Surrey Storm	Break
Sophia Candappa	(England) Surrey Storm	-
Niamh Cooper	(England) Surrey Storm	(England) Severn Stars
Charlotte Dunkley	(England) Surrey Storm	(England) Saracens Mavericks (Training Partner)
Layla Guscoth	(England) Surrey Storm	Break
Hannah Knights	(England) Surrey Storm	-
Felisitus Kwangwa	(England) Surrey Storm	-
Leah Middleton	(England) Surrey Storm	(Wales) Cardiff Dragons
Sienna Rushton	(England) Surrey Storm	-
Grace Sullivan	(England) Surrey Storm	-
Peace Akinyemi	-	(England) Saracens Mavericks
Anna Fairclough	(England) Manchester Thunder (Pathway)	(England) Saracens Mavericks (Training Partner)
Georgia Lees	(England) Saracens Mavericks (Training Partner)	(England) Saracens Mavericks
Indya Masser	(England) Loughborough Lightning (Pathway)	(England) Saracens Mavericks
Vicki Oyesola	(England) Leeds Rhinos	(England) Saracens Mavericks
Odiri Atirene	(England) Saracens Mavericks (Training Partner)	-
Eliza Barclay	(England) Saracens Mavericks (Training Partner)	-
Sasha Corbin	(England) Saracens Mavericks	Retired
Pippa Dixon	(England) Saracens Mavericks (Training Partner)	-
Beth Ecuyer-Dale	(England) Saracens Mavericks	(Wales) Cardiff Dragons
Ellie Kelk	(England) Saracens Mavericks	Break
Lisa Mather	(England) Saracens Mavericks	(New Zealand) Northern Stars
Monique Meyer	(England) Saracens Mavericks	(South Africa) Gauteng Golden Fireballs
Christina Shaw	(England) Saracens Mavericks	-
Betsy Creak	(England) Team Bath	(England) Severn Stars
Ella Powell-Davies	(England) Cardiff Dragons	(England) Severn Stars
Lefébre Rademan	Injured	(England) Severn Stars
Abigail Caple	(England) Severn Stars (Training Partner)	-
Isabelle Eaton	(England) Severn Stars	-
Jess Haynes	(England) Severn Stars	(England) Severn Stars (Training Partner)
Lucy Herdman	(England) Severn Stars	Injured
Sarah MacPhail	(England) Severn Stars	(England) Leeds Rhinos
Grace Namana	(England) Severn Stars	(New Zealand) Southern Steel
Lottie Robinson	(England) Severn Stars (Training Partner)	-
Lily Smith	(England) Severn Stars	(England) Severn Stars (Training Partner)
Kelsie Taylor	(England) Severn Stars	-
Amy Braithwaite	(England) Leeds Rhinos (Pathway)	(England) Leeds Rhinos
Zoe Davies	(Australia) Collingwood Magpies	(England) Leeds Rhinos
Celyn Emanuel	(Wales) Cardiff Dragons	(England) Leeds Rhinos
Amelia Hall	Break	(England) Leeds Rhinos
Cassie Howard	(England) Leeds Rhinos (Training Partner)	(England) Leeds Rhinos
Annie James	(England) Leeds Rhinos (Pathway)	(England) Leeds Rhinos (Training Partner)
Paige Kindred	(England) Leeds Rhinos (Pathway)	(England) Leeds Rhinos (Training Partner)
Emma Magee	Break	(England) Leeds Rhinos
Geva Mentor	(Australia) Collingwood Magpies	(England) Leeds Rhinos
Joyce Mvula	(New Zealand) Central Pulse	(England) Leeds Rhinos
Millie Veevers	(England) Leeds Rhinos (Pathway)	(England) Leeds Rhinos (Training Partner)
Ellie Bird	(England) Leeds Rhinos	Retired
Britt Coleman	(England) Leeds Rhinos (Training Partner)	-
Jemma Donoghue	(England) Leeds Rhinos	(Australia) New South Wales Swifts
Rosie Harris	(England) Leeds Rhinos	(England) Surrey Storm
Nia Jones	(England) Leeds Rhinos	(Wales) Cardiff Dragons
Elle McDonald	(England) Leeds Rhinos	(Wales) Cardiff Dragons
Emilia Roscoe	(England) Leeds Rhinos (Training Partner)	-
Millie Sanders	(England) Leeds Rhinos	(Scotland) Strathclyde Sirens
Cerys Cairns	(Scotland) Strathclyde Sirens (Training Partner)	(Scotland) Strathclyde Sirens
Cerys Finn	(Scotland) Strathclyde Sirens (Pathway)	(Scotland) Strathclyde Sirens
Zara Flett	(Scotland) Strathclyde Sirens (Pathway)	(Scotland) Strathclyde Sirens
Hannah Grant	(Scotland) Strathclyde Sirens (Pathway)	(Scotland) Strathclyde Sirens (Training Partner)
Hannah Leighton	(Wales) Cardiff Dragons	(Scotland) Strathclyde Sirens
Emma Love	(Scotland) Strathclyde Sirens (Pathway)	(Scotland) Strathclyde Sirens
Sesandile Owethu Ngubane	(South Africa) UJ Netball	(Scotland) Strathclyde Sirens
Emma Barrie	(Scotland) Strathclyde Sirens	(England) Team Bath
Kelly Boyle	(Scotland) Strathclyde Sirens	(Scotland) Strathclyde Sirens (Training Partner)
Natalie Bright	(Scotland) Strathclyde Sirens	-
Claire Maxwell	(Scotland) Strathclyde Sirens	Retired
Stella Oyella	(Scotland) Strathclyde Sirens	Injured
Abi Robson	(Scotland) Strathclyde Sirens	-
Helen Taylor	(Scotland) Strathclyde Sirens (Training Partner)	-
Abby Tyrell	(Scotland) Strathclyde Sirens	-

== Table ==
2024 Netball Superleague table
Pos	Team	Pld	W	D	L	GF	GA	GD	Pts	Qualification
1	Manchester Thunder (Q)	18	17	0	1	1200	844	+356	51	Qualifying for the Finals series
2	Loughborough Lightning (Q)	18	15	0	3	1217	951	+266	45	Qualifying for the Finals series
3	London Pulse (Q)	18	14	1	3	1024	876	+148	43	Qualifying for the Finals series
4	Severn Stars (Q)	18	12	0	6	1062	968	+94	36	Qualifying for the Finals series
5	Leeds Rhinos	18	8	0	10	969	982	−13	24	
6	Surrey Storm	18	7	0	11	998	1100	−102	21	
7	Saracens Mavericks	18	6	2	10	965	992	−27	20	
8	Cardiff Dragons	18	6	2	10	900	983	−83	20	
9	Strathclyde Sirens	18	1	1	16	841	1146	−305	4	
10	Team Bath	18	1	0	17	872	1206	−334	3	

== Finals series ==
=== Semi-finals ===
22 June 2024	Manchester Thunder	63-54	Severn Stars	Belle Vue Arena

22 June 2024	Loughborough Lightning	59-47	London Pulse	David Wallace Sports Hall

=== Third-place play-off ===
29 June 2024	Severn Stars	48-52	London Pulse	Resorts World Arena
14:00

=== Grand final ===
29 June 2024	Manchester Thunder	54-70	Loughborough Lightning	Resorts World Arena
16:30

== Awards ==
Netball Super League 2024 Awards
Award	Name	Team
Players Player of the Season	Lois Pearson	Manchester Thunder
Young Player of the Season	Izzi Phillips	London Pulse
Coach of the Season	Jo Trip	Severn Stars
Fans Player of the Season	Funmi Fadoju	London Pulse
Top Scorer	Mary Cholhok Nuba	Loughborough Lightning
Umpire of the Year	Gary Burgess	
All Star VII
GS	Mary Cholhok Nuba	Loughborough Lightning
GA	Lois Pearson	Manchester Thunder
WA	Jess Shaw	Severn Stars
C	Natalie Panagarry	Loughborough Lightning
WD	Imogen Allison	Manchester Thunder
GD	Funmi Fadoju	London Pulse
GK	Jas Brown	Severn Stars
