= Berri Neil =

English netball player (born 2003)

Personal information
- Full name: Berri Neil
- Born: 12 February 2003 (age 23) Greater Manchester
- Height: 182 cm (5 ft 11 1/2 in)
- School: Parrenthorn High School; Bury College

Netball career
- Playing positions: GA, GS
Years	Club team	Apps
2021	Manchester Thunder	
2022-2024	London Pulse	
2025-2026	Loughborough Lightning	
2027-	Nottingham Forest Netball	
Years	National team	Caps
2017-2021	England U17-U21	
2022	England Future Roses	
2023-present	England	11
Medal record
Representing England
Fast5 World Series
Bronze medal – third place	2023 Christchurch	Fast5
- Updated on July 2025

Berri Neil (born 12 February 2003) is an English international netball player. She plays for Nottingham Forest Netball in the Netball Super League and is part of the English national team.

== Early life and education ==
Neil grew up in Manchester and started playing netball at 9 years old at school. She later joined YWCA Bury netball club and then Oldham Netball Club. Neil attended Parrenthorn High School and Bury College.

== Club career ==
=== Manchester Thunder ===
Neil worked her way through the Manchester Thunder pathway and was named as a training partner in Thunder's senior squad in 2020. She made her Netball Super League debut for the club on her 18th birthday in February 2021 against Strathclyde Sirens.

=== London Pulse ===
She joined London Pulse ahead of the 2022 season where she partnered with England Rose goal shooter, Olivia Tchine. She helped Pulse reach the Netball Super League Grand Final in 2023, and was part of the 2024 squad that finished third after defeat in the play-off semi finals. Neil was named Young Player of the Season and the All Star VII GA for the 2023 season.

=== Loughborough Lightning ===
Neil moved to Loughborough Lightning for the 2025 season. Lightning made the 2025 Super League grand final but they lost 45–53 to Neil's old side London Pulse and finished runners up. Neil was named as the All Star VII GA for a second time in the 2025 season. In the 2026 season Lightning defeat Forest in the minor semi final but ultimately lost 60–56 to London Pulse preliminary final.

=== Nottingham Forest Netball ===
In June 2026 Neil was announced as a new signing for Nottingham Forest Netball.

== International career ==
In 2017 Neil was selected for the U17s National Academy. She made her first appearance for England U17s at the Europe Netball Championships before going on a tour to Australia later that year with fellow Roses’ Funmi Fadoju and Alicia Scholes. She worked her way through the U19 and U21 squads before joining the Future Roses programme.

In 2023 she was elevated into the Roses senior squad and later in the year, on 24 September 2023, she made her England debut against the New Zealand Silver Ferns in the 2023 Taini Jamison Trophy. She was part of the squad who won the 2024 Taini Jamison Trophy Series and the 2025 Netball Nations Cup.

Neil has also won silver with the roses at the 2024 Netball Nations cup and bronze at the 2023 Fast5 Netball World Series.

== Honours ==
=== England ===
- Netball Nations Cup: 2025 Runner up: 2024
- Taini Jamison Trophy: 2024
- Fast5 Netball World Series: Bronze: 2023

=== London Pulse ===
- Netball Super League: Runners up: 2023

=== Loughborough Lightning ===
- Netball Super League: Runners up: 2025

== Individual Awards ==
=== Netball Super League ===
- Young Player of the Year: 2023
- All Star VII: 2023, 2025

== Personal life ==
Neil was named in Hello! magazines Rising Stars of 2024.
