= Jasmine Brown (netball) =

England netball international (born 2001)

Personal information
- Full name: Jasmine Brown
- Nicknames: Jaz, Jas
- Born: 26 November 2001 (age 24) Doncaster, England
- Height: 188 cm (6 ft 2 in)
- University: Loughborough University

Netball career
- Playing position: GK
Years	Club team	Apps
2023–2024	Severn Stars	
2025	Birmingham Panthers	
2026	Leeds Rhinos	
Years	National team	Caps
2025	England	8
- (Correct as of February 2026)

Jasmine Brown (born 26 November 2001), also known as Jas Brown, is an England netball international. She has played for Severn Stars, Birmingham Panthers and Leeds Rhinos in the Netball Super League.

== Early life and education ==
Brown was born in Doncaster and has Australian and Jamaican heritage. She grew up playing tennis to a high level and played on the courts at Wimbledon before switching to netball in 2019.

She started her netball journey at Doncaster Rebels before joining Charnwood Netball Club after moving to study Sports Psychology at Loughborough University. Representing the university, she won back-to-back BUCS titles.

== Club career ==
=== Severn Stars ===
Brown made her Netball Super League debut for Severn Stars in the 2023 Netball Super League season. She established herself as a regular starter under Jo Trip in the 2024 Netball Super League season and helped Stars finish in the top four for the first time, with her 72 gains the fourth most in the league. This performance earned her a place in the 2024 All Star VII.

=== Birmingham Panthers ===
Following the disbandment of Severn Stars at the end of the 2024 Netball Super League season, Brown reunited with Trip at Birmingham Panthers, one of two new entries in the relaunched “NSL 2.0”, which aimed to professionalise the league. During the 2025 Netball Super League season, Brown was once again named in the All Star VII.

=== Leeds Rhinos ===
Brown signed for Leeds Rhinos ahead of the 2026 Super League season. Her season was cut short after just three league games in March 2026 when she suffered an achilles injury which ruled her out of the 2026 Commonwealth Games.

== International career ==
Brown was included in the Future Roses squad for 2024–25 before being named in the England A squad as part of the Roses’ preparations for the 2025 Netball Nations Cup. She earned her first senior cap at the 2025 England New Zealand netball series.

== Individual awards ==
=== Netball Super League ===
- All Star VII: 2024, 2025
