= Ella Clark =

British basketball and netball player

Personal information
- Full name: Ella Clark
- Born: 8 February 1992 (age 34) London, England
- Height: 189 cm (6 ft 2 1/2 in)
- School: Chingford Foundation School
- University: California State University, Long Beach

Netball career
- Playing positions: GA, GS
Years	Club team	Apps
2008	Hertfordshire Mavericks	
2016–present	Loughborough Lightning	
Years	National team	Caps
2015–	England	5

Ella Clark
Personal information
- Born: 8 February 1992 (age 34) London, United Kingdom
- Listed height: 1.90 m (6 ft 3 in)

Career information
- College: California State University, Long Beach
- Playing career: 2008–2021
- Position: Small forward / power forward,
- Number: 7

Career history
- 2008–2010: Barking Abbey
- 2010–2014: Long Beach 49ers
- 2014–2015: CD Zamarat
- 2015–2016: Gernika KESB
- 2016–2017: PF Umbertide
- 2019–2021: Leicester Riders

Ella Clark (born 8 February 1992) is a British female professional basketball and netball player. She plays for Loughborough Lightning in the Netball Super League, where she is a three-time champion and is a member of the England national netball team.

== Early life and education ==
Clark is from a well-known British basketball family, her father Mark coached the GB national women's team from 2006 to 2009 and her mother played for the National team. Her brother Daniel Clark is a retired international basketball player. Clark attended Chingford Foundation School and first played netball for Manor Netball Club.

== Club netball career ==
Clark made her Netball Super League debut in 2009 for Hertfordshire Mavericks after representing England at the under-21 World Championships in 2008 and again in 2009.

After taking a break from the sport she returned to professional netball in 2016. She has played for Loughborough Lightning in the Netball Super League since 2018 and won her first Super League title with them in June 2021. Lightning then won back-to-back titles in 2023 and 2024. She made the 2025 Super League grand final but Lightning lost 45-53 to London Pulse to finish runners up. She was named into the All Star VII as GA for the 2026 season.

== International netball career ==
On 13 May 2016, she made her senior debut for England against Northern Ireland in the 2016 Netball Europe Open Championships. Ahead of the 2026-27 season Clark was named in the England Roses full-time programme and in July she was named as a injury replacement for Natalie Metcalf for the 2026 Commonwealth Games.

== Honours ==
=== Loughborough Lightning ===
- Netball Super League: 2021, 2023, 2024
  - Runners Up: 2017, 2018, 2022, 2025

== Individual awards ==
=== Netball Super League ===
- All Star VII: 2026
