= 2025 Netball Super League season =

Sports season in England and Wales

- League: Netball Super League
- Sport: Netball
- Duration: 14 March 2025 – 6 July 2025
- Teams: 8
- TV partner(s): BBC & Sky Sports

Regular Season
- Season MVP: Rolene Streutker
- Top scorer: Rolene Streutker

Finals Series
- Date: 6 July 2025
- Venue: The O2 Arena
- Champions: London Pulse
- Runners-up: Loughborough Lightning
- Finals MVP: Funmi Fadoju

Seasons
- ← 2024 2026 →

The 2025 Netball Super League season was the twentieth season of the Netball Super League, the elite domestic netball competition in the United Kingdom. Loughborough Lightning were the defending champions, as they won the 2024 Grand final for their second consecutive title and third in four years.

London Pulse won the competition beating Loughborough Lightning in the grand final to claim their inaugural Super League title.

== Format ==
The league was revamped for the 2025 season in an effort to fully professionalise the league. The number of teams was decreased from ten to eight with Severn Stars, Strathclyde Sirens, Surrey Storm and Team Bath dropping out to be replaced by newcomers Birmingham Panthers and Nottingham Forest.

In the regular season all eight teams are to play each other twice, home and away. The teams that finish in the top four of the regular season qualify for the semi-finals. The first and second placed teams qualify for the major semi-final where the winner progresses directly to the final. The third and fourth placed teams qualify for the minor semi-final where the winner will face the loser of the major semi-final for a place in the Grand Final.

There were new rules introduced for this season:

- Super shot
- No draws
- Timeouts
- More points

== Teams ==
Team	Home court(s)	Coach	Captain(s)	Ref.
Birmingham Panthers	bp pulse LIVE; Worcester Arena; Coventry Skydome; Utilita Arena Birmingham	Jo Trip	Gabriella Marshall (c); Betsy Creak (vc)	
Cardiff Dragons	Cardiff City House of Sport; Utilita Arena Cardiff	Reinga Bloxham	Jacqueline Newton (c); Elle McDonald (vc); Leah Middleton (vc)	
Leeds Rhinos	Canon Medical Arena; First Direct Arena	Lauren Palmer	Bethany Brittain (c); Rosie Harris (vc); Geva Mentor (vc); Joyce Mvula (vc)	
London Mavericks	Brentwood Centre; Brighton Centre; Hertfordshire Sports Village; OVO Arena Wembley	Camilla Buchanan	Ellie Rattu (c); Vicki Oyesola (vc); Emma Thacker (vc)	
London Pulse	Copper Box Arena	Sam Bird	Zara Everitt (c); Halimat Adio (vc)	
Loughborough Lightning	Sir David Wallace Arena; Motorpoint Arena	Victoria Burgess	Natalie Panagarry (c); Beth Cobden (vc); Hannah Joseph (vc)	
Manchester Thunder	AO Arena; Belle Vue Arena; M&S Bank Arena	Karen Greig	Amy Carter (c); Josie Huckle (vc); Taylor McKevitt (vc)	
Nottingham Forest	Motorpoint Arena	Chelsea Pitman	Niamh Cooper (c); Natasha Pavelin (vc)	

== Squads ==
The 2025 signing window gave all eight clubs the opportunity to make signings and finalise their squads before the season began. The signing window opened on Monday 1 July 2024 and clubs were given until 5pm on Friday 23 August 2024 to register 10 players. This is different than the 2024 season where each team could register 12 players plus 3 training partners. Also new to the 2025 season is the creation of the Under 23 competition (NXT Gen). Each Super League club also has a Under 23 team in the newly formed Under 23 competition from which they can draw Temporary Replacement Players. Permanent Replacement Players can be drawn from any squad in the league.

== Table ==
2025 Netball Super League table
Pos	Team	Pld	W	L	GF	GA	GD	BP	Pts	Qualification
1	London Pulse	14	12	2	932	743	+189	1	37	Qualifying for the Finals Series
2	Loughborough Lightning	14	10	4	935	858	+77	2	32	Qualifying for the Finals Series
3	Manchester Thunder	14	10	4	903	793	+110	1	31	Qualifying for the Finals Series
4	London Mavericks	14	8	6	833	890	−57	1	25	Qualifying for the Finals Series
5	Nottingham Forest	14	7	7	926	916	+10	1	22	
6	Birmingham Panthers	14	5	9	893	939	−46	5	20	
7	Leeds Rhinos	14	2	12	827	953	−126	3	9	
8	Cardiff Dragons	14	2	12	767	924	−157	2	8	

Source: Netball Super League
Rules for classification: 1) Points; 2) Goal difference; 3) Number of goals scored;

== Results Summary ==
Home \ Away	PAN	DRA	RHI	MAV	PUL	LIG	THU	FOR
Birmingham Panthers	—	57–61	71–69	67–69	58–68	67–58	47–77	71–70
Cardiff Dragons	56–62	—	44–60	56–65	44–67	54–71	47–72	53–77
Leeds Rhinos	71–63	52–60	—	66–71	53–72	58–72	55–69	60–74
London Mavericks	69–68	72–61	54–53	—	53–63	45–55	45–67	57–48
London Pulse	63–58	67–52	73–50	78–42	—	53–58	61–56	73–51
Loughborough Lightning	72–68	70–63	71–59	79–58	51–77	—	65–53	62–66
Manchester Thunder	67–61	59–54	71–57	59–54	48–58	52–66	—	81–65
Nottingham Forest	69–75	70–54	80–61	56–67	69–59	73–71	58–72	—

Source: Netball Superleague
Legend: Blue = home team win; Yellow = draw; Red = away team win.

== Regular season ==
=== Round 1 ===
Friday 14 March	Cardiff Dragons	56 - 65	London Mavericks	Cardiff City House of Sport
		Report; Stats

Friday 14 March	Leeds Rhinos	71 - 63	Birmingham Panthers	Canon Medical Arena
		Report; Stats

Sunday 16 March	London Pulse	73 - 51	Nottingham Forest	Copper Box Arena
		Report; Stats

Sunday 16 March	Manchester Thunder	52 - 66	Loughborough Lightning	AO Arena
		Report; Stats

=== Round 2 ===
Friday 21 March	Nottingham Forest	70 - 54	Cardiff Dragons	Motorpoint Arena
19:30 GMT		Report; Stats

Friday 21 March	Birmingham Panthers	47 - 77	Manchester Thunder	bp pulse LIVE
19:30 GMT		Report; Stats

Saturday 22 March	Loughborough Lightning	51 - 77	London Pulse	Sir David Wallace Arena
18:00 GMT		Report; Stats

Sunday 23 March	London Mavericks	54 - 53	Leeds Rhinos	Brentwood Centre
16:00 GMT		Report; Stats

=== Round 3 ===
Friday 28 March	London Pulse	78 - 42	London Mavericks	Copper Box Arena
19:00 GMT		Report; Stats

Saturday 28 March	Manchester Thunder	81 - 65	Nottingham Forest	Belle Vue Arena
19:30 GMT		Report; Stats

Sunday 30 March	Leeds Rhinos	58 - 72	Loughborough Lightning	First Direct Arena
16:00 BST		Report; Stats

Wednesday 21 May	Cardiff Dragons	v	Birmingham Panthers	Cardiff City House of Sport
18:30 BST		Stats

=== Round 4 ===
Friday 4 April	Leeds Rhinos	53 - 72	London Pulse	Canon Medical Arena
19:00 BST		Report; Stats

Saturday 5 April	Nottingham Forest	73 - 71	Loughborough Lightning	Motorpoint Arena
15:00 BST		Report; Stats

Saturday 5 April	Cardiff Dragons	47 - 72	Manchester Thunder	Utilita Arena Cardiff
19:00 BST		Report; Stats

Sunday 6 April	London Mavericks	69 - 68	Birmingham Panthers	Brighton Centre
16:00 BST		Report; Stats

=== Round 5 ===
Friday 11 April	Nottingham Forest	56 - 67	London Mavericks	Motorpoint Arena
19:30 BST		Report; Stats

Saturday 12 April	Manchester Thunder	71 - 57	Leeds Rhinos	Belle Vue Arena
17:00 BST		Report; Stats

Saturday 12 April	Loughborough Lightning	70 - 63	Cardiff Dragons	Sir David Wallace Arena
18:00 BST		Report; Stats

Sunday 13 April	Birmingham Panthers	58 - 68	London Pulse	Worcester Arena
18:00 BST		Report; Stats

=== Round 6 ===
Friday 18 April	London Pulse	61 - 56	Manchester Thunder	Copper Box Arena
19:00 BST		Report; Stats

Saturday 19 April	London Mavericks	45 - 55	Loughborough Lightning	Hertfordshire Sports Village
17:00 BST		Report; Stats

Saturday 19 April	Birmingham Panthers	71 - 70	Nottingham Forest	Worcester Arena
18:00 BST		Report; Stats

Saturday 19 April	Cardiff Dragons	44 - 60	Leeds Rhinos	Cardiff City House of Sport
19:00 BST		Report; Stats

=== Round 7 ===
Friday 25 April	Loughborough Lightning	72 - 68	Birmingham Panthers	Sir David Wallace Arena
19:00 BST		Report; Stats

Friday 25 April	Leeds Rhinos	60 - 74	Nottingham Forest	Canon Medical Arena
19:00 BST		Report; Stats

Sunday 27 April	London Pulse	67 - 52	Cardiff Dragons	Copper Box Arena
18:00 BST		Report; Stats

Monday 28 April	Manchester Thunder	59 - 54	London Mavericks	Belle Vue Arena
19:00 BST		Report; Stats

=== Round 8 ===
Friday 2 May	Loughborough Lightning	65 - 53	Manchester Thunder	Motorpoint Arena
19:30 BST		Report; Stats

Saturday 3 May	London Mavericks	72 - 61	Cardiff Dragons	Hertfordshire Sports Village
16:00 BST		Report; Stats

Sunday 4 May	Nottingham Forest	69 - 59	London Pulse	Motorpoint Arena
16:00 BST		Report; Stats

Sunday 4 May	Birmingham Panthers	71 - 69	Leeds Rhinos	Worcester Arena
18:00 BST		Report; Stats

== Finals Series ==
=== Semi-finals ===
==== Minor Semi-final ====
Friday 20 June	Manchester Thunder	79-49	London Mavericks	Belle Vue Arena
		Stats

==== Major Semi-final ====
Friday 20 June	London Pulse	50-49	Loughborough Lightning	Copper Box Arena
		Stats

=== Preliminary Final ===
Saturday June 28/Sunday June 29	Loughborough Lightning	69-57	Manchester Thunder	Sir David Wallace Arena/ Motorpoint Arena
		Report

=== Grand final ===
Sunday July 6	London Pulse	53-45	Loughborough Lightning	The O2

== Awards ==
Netball Super League End of Season Award Winners

Award	Name	Team	Ref
Players Player of the Season	(South Africa) Rolene Streutker	Nottingham Forest Netball	
Young Player of the Season	(England) Jayda Pechova	Nottingham Forest Netball	
Coach of the Season	(England) Camila Buchanan	London Mavericks	
Fans Player of the Season	(England) Funmi Fadoju	London Pulse	
Gilbert Top Scorer	(South Africa) Rolene Streutker	Nottingham Forest Netball	
Soft & Gentle Super Shooter	(South Africa) Rolene Streutker	Nottingham Forest Netball	
Umpire of the Year	(England) Gary Burgess		
Assessors Award	(England) Louise Cole		
All Star VII			
GS	(South Africa) Rolene Streutker	Nottingham Forest Netball	
GA	(England) Berri Neil	Loughborough Lightning	
WA	(England) Suzie Liverseidge	London Mavericks	
C	(England) Amy Carter	Manchester Thunder	
WD	(England) Cassie Howard	Leeds Rhinos Netball	
GD	(England) Funmi Fadoju	London Pulse	
GK	(England) Jas Brown	Birmingham Panthers	
