= Natalie Metcalf =

English netball player

Personal information
- Full name: Natalie Metcalf (née Haythornthwaite)
- Born: 9 December 1992 (age 33) Barrowford, England
- Height: 174 cm (5 ft 8 1/2 in)
- University: University of Leeds; Leeds Beckett University

Netball career
- Playing positions: WA, GA
Years	Club team	Apps
2010–2015	Yorkshire Jets	
2016	Manchester Thunder	
2017–2018	Wasps Netball	
2018–2021	New South Wales Swifts	
2022–	Manchester Thunder	
Years	National team	Caps
2015–	England	
2012	Great Britain	
Medal record
Representing England
Commonwealth Games
Gold medal – first place	2018 Gold Coast	Team
Netball World Cup
Bronze medal – third place	2019 Liverpool	Team
Silver medal – second place	2023 Cape Town	Team
Fast5 Netball World Series
Gold medal – first place	2017 Melbourne	Team
Representing Great Britain
World University Netball Championship
Gold medal – first place	2012 Cape Town	Team

Natalie Metcalf (née Haythornthwaite; born 9 December 1992) is an English netball player. She was part of the England squad that won gold at the 2018 Commonwealth Games. She was appointed captain of the England team in 2022 and led them to their first Netball World Cup final a year later, where they finished runner up to Australia.

== Early life and education ==
Metcalf was born at Airedale General Hospital and grew up in Barrowford, Lancashire. She attended secondary school at Ss John Fisher and Thomas More Roman Catholic High School in Colne and went on to study Speech & Language Therapy at Leeds Beckett University.

== Club career ==
=== Yorkshire Jets/Leeds Cargegie ===
Metcalf started her Netball Super League career with the Yorkshire Jets/Leeds Carnegie, where she played for six seasons. She was named as the 2015 Netball Super League Player of the Season.

=== Manchester Thunder ===
She joined Manchester Thunder ahead of the 2016 season and made the grand final that same year. Metcalf played the full game as WA but Thunder ultimately lost to Surrey Storm.

=== Wasps Netball ===
Metcalf moved to Wasps Netball for their inaugural season in 2017. There she won consecutive Super League grand finals in 2017 and 2018.

=== New South Wales Swifts ===
Shortly after the 2018 Super League grand final Metcalf joined the New South Wales Swifts during the Australian Super Netball season as an injury replacement for Claire O'Brien. She permanently joined the squad for the 2019 season where the swifts won the premiership, defeating Sunshine Coast Lightning in the Grand Final. Metcalf won a second Super Netball grand final with the Swifts in 2021.

=== Manchester Thunder ===
Metcalf announced in September 2021 that she would be leaving Australia to return to the UK. She rejoined Manchester Thunder for 2022 and won her third Super League grand final that same year. Metcalf made the grand final with Thunder again in 2024 but the team lost to Loughborough Lightning. Metcalf announced her pregnancy in 2025 and would not take part in the 2025 Netball Super League or any international matches. Metlcalf returned to court for the 2026 season where Thunder defeated London Pulse 54-51 in the Grand Final to be named champions.

=== London Mavericks ===
In August 2026, it was announced that Metcalf would be joining London Mavericks for the 2027 Netball Super League Season, joining former Wasps team mate and current London Mavericks head coach Tamsin Greenway

== International career ==
Metcalf made her senior international debut for the Vitality Roses against Trinidad and Tobago in 2015. She won a bronze medal at the 2019 Netball World Cup and she helped England win their historic first gold medal at a major international competition at the 2018 Commonwealth Games.

Metcalf earned her 50th cap in January 2020. She was named vice captain of the England Team for the 2022 Netball Quad Series against Australia, New Zealand and South Africa and captain for the 2022 Commonwealth Games where they placed fourth.

In summer 2023, she was co-captain of the history-making Vitality Roses side that reached a first-ever Netball World Cup final and won the silver medal. In June 2026 Metcalf was selected into the 2026 Commonwealth Games team, her third Games and first following the birth of her daughter in 2024. Metcalf sustained a calf injury during the Prep Camp on 20 July and was ruled out of the Games. She was replaced by Ella Clark.

Tournaments	Place
2017 Netball Quad Series (January/February)	3rd
2017 Netball Quad Series (August/September)	3rd
2017 Fast5 Netball World Series	1st place, gold medalist(s)
2018 Netball Quad Series (January)	2nd
2018 Commonwealth Games	1st place, gold medalist(s)
2018 Netball Quad Series (September)	2nd
2019 Netball Quad Series	2nd
2019 Netball World Cup	3rd place, bronze medalist(s)
2023 Netball Quad Series	3rd
2023 Netball World Cup	2nd place, silver medalist(s)

== Personal life ==
In 2021, Metcalf announced she would be getting married. At the end of December 2021, she married Josh Metcalf and changed her name from Haythornthwaite to Metcalf. On 8 November 2024, Natalie announced her pregnancy and will not take part in the 2025 Netball Super League or any international matches.

== Honours ==
=== England ===
- Netball World Cup: Silver: 2023 Bronze: 2019
- Fast5 Netball World Series: Gold: 2017

=== Manchester Thunder ===
- Netball Super League: 2022, 2026 Runners up: 2016, 2024

=== Wasps Netball ===
- Netball Super League: 2017, 2018

=== New South Wales Swifts ===
- Suncorp Super Netball: 2019, 2021
