= Rolene Streutker =

South African netball player

Personal information
- Born: 20 October 2000 (age 25) South Africa
- Height: 186 cm (6 ft 1 in)
- University: University of the Free State

Netball career
- Playing position: GS
2024	Melbourne Mavericks	
2025-present	Nottingham Forest Netball	
Years	National team	Caps
2023-present	South Africa	

Rolene Streutker (born 20 October 2000) is a South African international netball player. She plays for Nottingham Forest Netball in the English Netball Super League.

== Early life and education ==
Streutker studied at the University of the Free State, where she also played for their varsity netball team, known as the Kovsies. They were the 2024 Varsity Netball champions and Streutker was named the player of the tournament.

== Club career ==
=== Melbourne Mavericks ===
Streutker joined Melbourne Mavericks in the Super Netball as a training partner in 2024.

=== Nottingham Forest Netball ===
Streutker was signed by Nottingham Forest Netball ahead of their debut season in 2025. Streutker was named NSL Player of the Year for the 2025 season as well as picking up the Gilbert Top Scorer Award, Soft & Gentle Super Shooter award and All Star 7 recognition. Forest were also the only team to beat both Grand Finalists, London Pulse and Loughborough Lightning.

== International career ==
In 2023, she made her senior international debut for South Africa in a 62-43 loss to Australia, but demonstrated her clinical nature in the shooting circle by finishing with a 92% conversion rate. She was named in the squad for the 2025 Netball Nations Cup, where the Proteas took home silver.

== Honours ==
=== South Africa ===
- Netball Nations Cup: Silver: 2025

== Individual awards ==
=== Netball Super League ===
- NSL Player of the Year: 2025
- Gilbert Top Scorer: 2025
- Soft & Gentle Super Shooter: 2025
- All Star VII: 2025
