= Funmi Fadoju =

English international netball player (born 2002)

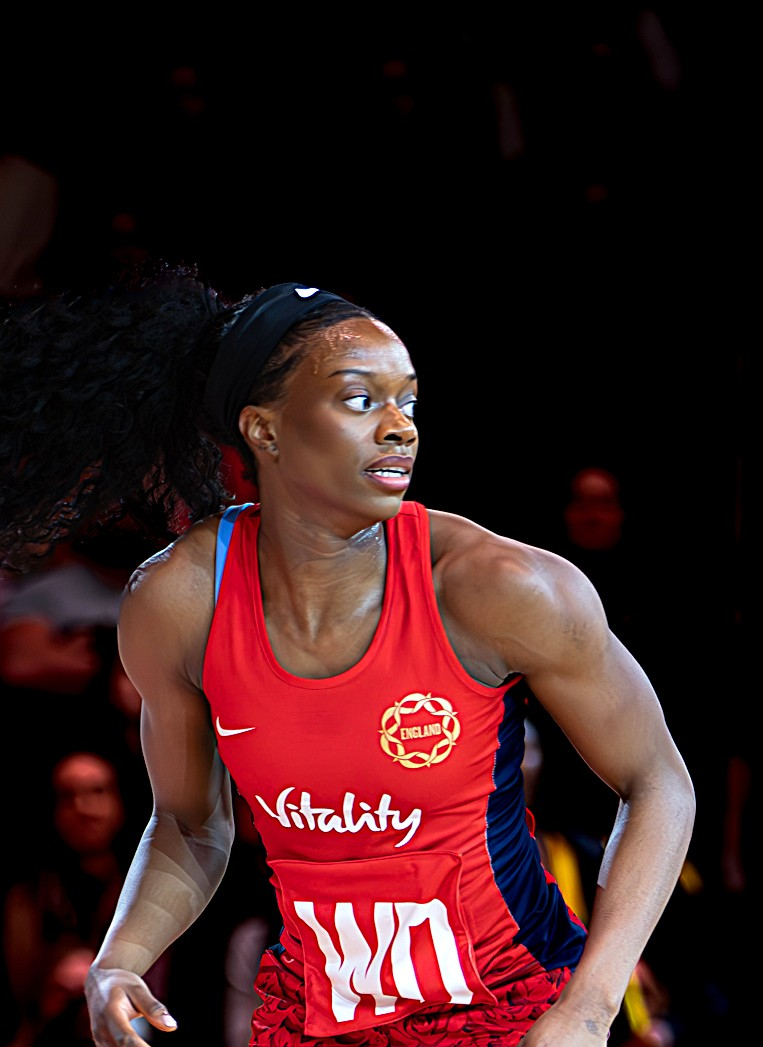

Personal information
- Born: 15 August 2002 (age 23) Dagenham, London, England
- Height: 1.76 m (5 ft 9 in)
- School: Eastbury Community School

Netball career
- Playing positions: GD, GK
Years	Club team	Apps
2020–present	London Pulse	
- (Correct as of July 2025)
Years	National team	Caps
c. 2019	England U21	
2022–	England	41
- (Correct as of July 2025)
Medal record
Representing England
Netball World Cup
Silver medal – second place	2023 Cape Town	Netball

Funmi Fadoju (born 15 August 2002) is an English international netball player. She plays for London Pulse in the Netball Super League and is a member of the England national netball team. She was a member of the English team that came second at the 2023 Netball World Cup.

== Early life and education ==
Fadoju is from Dagenham and is of Nigerian descent. She first played netball for New Cambell Netball Club. She attended Eastbury Community School, and won a schools cross-country competition in 2017.

== Club career ==
=== London Pulse ===
Fadoju is 1.76 metres (5.8 ft) tall, which is comparatively short for a defender. She made her Netball Super League debut for London Pulse in March 2020 coming on in the third quarter of the opening match of the season. She won the Netball Super League Young Player of the Season award in both 2021 and 2022 seasons. Fadoju once played a whole match with a headphone in by accident.

She helped Pulse reach the Netball Super League Grand Final in 2023 however they ultimately lost to Loughborough Lightning. She was also part of the 2024 squad that finished third after defeat in the play-off semi finals. Fadoju was named as the All Star VII GD for the 2024 season, topping the table in every defensive stat and being named in the NSL Team of the Week an 13 times.

Fadoju won her first Super League title in 2025, defeating Loughborough Lightning 53-45. After a strong defensive display with eight deflections, three intercepts and eight gains, Fadoju was named player of the match. She was also named as the All Star VII GD for a second time in the 2025 season. In 2026 Fadoju reached a third Super League Grand final but lost to Manchester Thunder in the final.

== International career ==
Fadoju represented England under-21s at the 2019 Netball Europe Championships, aged 16.

Fadoju received her first senior callup for the 2021 Vitality Roses Reunited Series, and made her debut for the senior team in their 2022 series against Uganda. She was not selected for the 2022 Commonwealth Games. She played for England in their tour of Australia. In the final game of the series, she was the player of the match with 17 deflections. In December 2022, Netball Scoop named Fadoju joint sixth in their list of world's best players.

Fadoju was selected for the 2023 Netball World Cup, and played in the final, where England lost to Australia to win Silver. She did not play in the 2023 Taini Jamison Trophy Series, but returned to the squad for their December 2023 series against South Africa.

She was named in the squad for the 2025 Netball Nations Cup and was named player of the match in the final against South Africa where England won gold. In June 2026 Fadoju was selected into the 2026 Commonwealth Games team.

== Honours ==
=== England ===
- Netball World Cup: Silver: 2023
- Netball Nations Cup: 2025 Runner up: 2024
- Taini Jamison Trophy: 2024

=== London Pulse ===
- Netball Super League: 2025 Runners up: 2023, 2026

== Individual awards ==
=== Netball Super League ===
- Young Player of the Year: 2021, 2022
- All Star VII: 2024, 2025
- Fans Player of the Season: 2024, 2025
