= 2022 Netball Superleague season =

British netball season

- League: Netball Superleague
- Sport: Netball
- Duration: 5 February - 5 June 2022
- Teams: 11

Regular Season
- Season MVP: Layla Guscoth
- Top scorer: Proscovia Peace

Grand Final
- Date: 5 June 202
- Venue: Copper Box
- Champions: Manchester Thunder
- Runners-up: Loughborough Lightning

Seasons
- ← 2021 2023 →

The 2022 Netball Superleague season was the seventeenth season of the Netball Superleague, the elite domestic netball competition in the United Kingdom. Loughborough Lightning were the defending champions, as they won the 2021 season. The season began on 5 February, and ended with the grand final on 5 June.

Manchester Thunder were the first team to qualify for the finals series, after they secured their place on 17 April. Loughborough Lightning qualified for the final series on 2 May. London Pulse qualified for the final series on 14 May. Team Bath were the final team to qualify for the final series, doing so on 21 May. The semi-finals took place on 3 June, with Manchester Thunder and Loughborough Lightning advancing to the grand final. Manchester Thunder beat Loughborough Lightning 60–53 in the final to win the competition, completing an unbeaten season and winning their fourth Superleague title.

== Overview ==
=== Format ===
The fixture list for the 2022 Netball Superleague season was announced on 3 November 2021. The season began on 5 February and the grand final is scheduled for 5 June. The first fixtures were the "Season Opener" double-header weekend at the Resorts World Arena in Birmingham on 5 and 6 February, and the Rounds 13 and 14 fixtures were all held at one venue.

In the league section, each team played every other team at home and away in the traditional format. In the 2021 season, all matches had been played at Studio 001 in Wakefield or the Copper Box Arena in London due to the COVID-19 pandemic. Fans are expected to be allowed at all matches; in the 2021 season, matches were held behind closed doors until round 17, and matches from then onwards were limited to 1,000 spectators.

=== Teams ===
Team	Base
Celtic Dragons	Cardiff, Wales
Leeds Rhinos	Leeds, West Yorkshire
London Pulse	Stratford, Greater London
Loughborough Lightning	Loughborough, Leicestershire
Manchester Thunder	Manchester, Greater Manchester
Saracens Mavericks	Hatfield, Hertfordshire
Severn Stars	Worcester, Worcestershire
Strathclyde Sirens	Glasgow, Scotland
Surrey Storm	Guildford, Surrey
Team Bath	Bath, Somerset
Wasps	Coventry, West Midlands

=== Squads ===
Each team had a squad of 15 players, 12 of whom were registered players, and three training partners. Of the 12 registered players, 10 of them were covered by the sport's salary cap. A team's matchday squad could contain 12 players. Each team were permitted to sign two non-EU players and these players were not allowed to play in the same third of the court simultaneously. The player signing window ran from 15 September to 15 October 2021.

Celtic Dragons signed South African Lefébre Rademan from London Pulse, Annabel Roddy from Loughborough Lightning, as well as Georgia Rowe and Nia Jones from Severn Stars, and both Katarina Short and Louise Marsden, who were unattached players. Leeds Rhinos signed Amy Clinton from Celtic Dragons, Rebekah Airey from Manchester Thunder and Sigi Burger from London Pulse. London Pulse signed Jasmin Odeogberin from Loughborough Lightning, Berri Neil and Alicia Scholes from Manchester Thunder and both Tayla Honey and Sacha McDonald from Australian Suncorp Super Netball side Melbourne Vixens. Loughborough Lightning signed England international player Fran Williams from Wasps, and South African Zanele Vimbela, who missed the 2021 season through injury.

Manchester Thunder signed international players Natalie Haythornthwaite, Shadine van der Merwe and Emma Rayner. Malawian Joyce Mvula resigned for the club on a two-year contract. Saracens Mavericks signed Yasmin Hodge-England from Surrey Storm. Severn Stars signed Cat Tuivaiti from Strathclyde Sirens, Katie Harris from Wasps, Michelle Drayne from London Pulse and Summer Artman from Team Bath. Strathclyde Sirens signed Abby Tyrrell from Celtic Dragons. Surrey Storm signed Ugandan captain Peace Proscovia from Australian club side Sunshine Coast Lightning. Felistus Kwangwa, the first Zimbabwean to play in the Netball Superleague, resigned for Storm. Team Bath signed Lily May Catling from Wasps, and Wasps signed Lauren Nicholls and Lucy Parize from Loughborough Lightning, as well as Ellie Gibbons from Celtic Dragons.

== Table ==
2022 Netball Superleague table
Pos	Team	Pld	W	D	L	GF	GA	GD	Pts	Qualification
1	Manchester Thunder (Q)	20	20	0	0	1385	1061	+324	60	Qualifying for the Finals series
2	Loughborough Lightning (Q)	20	18	0	2	1227	1029	+198	54	Qualifying for the Finals series
3	London Pulse (Q)	20	14	0	6	1020	929	+91	42	Qualifying for the Finals series
4	Team Bath (Q)	20	12	0	8	1062	985	+77	36	Qualifying for the Finals series
5	Saracens Mavericks	20	9	0	11	1071	1073	−2	27	
6	Leeds Rhinos	20	9	0	11	1019	1146	−127	27	
7	Surrey Storm	20	8	0	12	1088	1163	−75	24	
8	Strathclyde Sirens	20	7	0	13	970	1033	−63	21	
9	Wasps	20	7	0	13	998	1068	−70	21	
10	Celtic Dragons	20	3	0	17	955	1106	−151	9	
11	Severn Stars	20	3	0	17	954	1156	−202	9	

== League stage ==
=== Rounds 1 & 2 ===
The match between Leeds Rhinos and Loughborough Lightning was postponed, as Leeds Rhinos did not have 10 available players, due to injuries and COVID-19 cases.

5 February	Loughborough Lightning	61–50	London Pulse	Resorts World Arena
12:00

5 February	Team Bath	54–40	Strathclyde Sirens	Resorts World Arena
13:45

5 February	Manchester Thunder	79–53	Celtic Dragons	Resorts World Arena
15:30

5 February	Wasps	49–58	Saracens Mavericks	Resorts World Arena
17:15

5 February	Surrey Storm	56–47	Severn Stars	Resorts World Arena
19:00

6 February	Wasps	44–50	Strathclyde Sirens	Resorts World Arena
12:45

6 February	London Pulse	52–48	Team Bath	Resorts World Arena
14:30

6 February	Celtic Dragons	54–61	Saracens Mavericks	Resorts World Arena
16:15

6 February	Severn Stars	45–70	Manchester Thunder	Resorts World Arena
18:00

29 April (Note: Rearranged from 6 February.)	Leeds Rhinos	56–71	Loughborough Lightning	Allam Sports Centre
19:00

=== Round 3 ===
11 February	Saracens Mavericks	53–51	London Pulse	Hertfordshire Sports Village
19:00

11 February	Strathclyde Sirens	43–45	Leeds Rhinos	Emirates Arena
19:30

12 February	Manchester Thunder	76–68	Surrey Storm	Belle Vue
17:00

12 February	Loughborough Lightning	65–37	Celtic Dragons	Sir David Wallace Arena
18:00

12 February	Wasps	54–45	Severn Stars	Coventry Building Society Arena
19:00

14 February	Leeds Rhinos	47–67	Team Bath	English Institute of Sport, Sheffield
17:30

=== Round 4 ===
18 February	Team Bath	58–62	Surrey Storm	Team Bath Arena
19:30

19 February	Celtic Dragons	52–57	Leeds Rhinos	Sport Wales National Centre
16:00

20 February	Severn Stars	52–62	Saracens Mavericks	University of Worcester Arena
15:00

21 February	Strathclyde Sirens	60–71	Manchester Thunder	Emirates Arena
17:30

21 February	London Pulse	52–35	Wasps	Copper Box Arena
19:00

21 February	Surrey Storm	56–72	Loughborough Lightning	Surrey Sports Park
19:30

=== Round 5 ===
25 February	Strathclyde Sirens	48–61	Loughborough Lightning	Emirates Arena
19:30

26 February	London Pulse	50–37	Celtic Dragons	Copper Box Arena
14:00

26 February	Saracens Mavericks	56–59	Manchester Thunder	Hertfordshire Sports Village
16:00

26 February	Severn Stars	45–48	Team Bath	University of Gloucestershire Arena
18:00

26 February	Surrey Storm	59–49	Leeds Rhinos	Surrey Sports Park
18:00

28 February	Manchester Thunder	71–51	Wasps	Belle Vue
17:30

=== Round 6 ===
4 March	Team Bath	53–57	Manchester Thunder	Team Bath Arena
19:30

5 March	London Pulse	64–35	Severn Stars	Copper Box Arena
14:00

5 March	Strathclyde Sirens	59–57	Surrey Storm	Emirates Arena
14:00

5 March	Loughborough Lightning	71–47	Saracens Mavericks	Sir David Wallace Arena
19:00

6 March	Leeds Rhinos	44–43	Wasps	First Direct Arena
16:00

7 March	Severn Stars	42–58	Celtic Dragons	University of Worcester Arena
17:30

=== Round 7 ===
11 March	Severn Stars	49–53	Leeds Rhinos	University of Worcester Arena
19:00

11 March	Wasps	60–37	Celtic Dragons	Coventry Building Society Arena
19:30

12 March	London Pulse	56–50	Surrey Storm	Copper Box Arena
14:00

12 March	Saracens Mavericks	48–45	Strathclyde Sirens	Sir David Wallace Arena
15:00

12 March	Manchester Thunder	69–45	Leeds Rhinos	Manchester Arena
17:30

=== Round 8 ===
13 March	Surrey Storm	55–53	Saracens Mavericks	Surrey Sports Park

13 March	Team Bath	59–43	Celtic Dragons	Team Bath Arena

13 March	Loughborough Lightning	57–53	Wasps	Sir David Wallace Arena

14 March	Team Bath	44–53	Loughborough Lightning	Team Bath Arena
17:30

14 March	London Pulse	48–38	Strathclyde Sirens	Copper Box Arena
19:00

=== Round 9 ===
18 March	Strathclyde Sirens	51–41	Celtic Dragons	Emirates Arena
19:30

19 March	Saracens Mavericks	51–53	Leeds Rhinos	Hertfordshire Sports Village
16:00

19 March	Manchester Thunder	51–48	London Pulse	Belle Vue
17:00

19 March	Severn Stars	56–70	Loughborough Lightning	University of Gloucestershire Arena
18:00

19 March	Wasps	62–50	Team Bath	Coventry Building Society Arena
19:00

21 March	Surrey Storm	67–59	Wasps	Surrey Sports Park
17:30

=== Round 10 ===
The matches between Team Bath and Saracens Mavericks and between Strathclyde Sirens and Severn Stars were postponed due to COVID-19 positive tests.

26 March	Leeds Rhinos	44–58	London Pulse	EIS Sheffield
15:00

28 March	Loughborough Lightning	61–66	Manchester Thunder	Sir David Wallace Arena
17:30

28 March	Celtic Dragons	53–54	Surrey Storm	Sport Wales National Centre
19:00

29 April (Note: Rearranged from 25 March.)	Team Bath	50–49	Saracens Mavericks	Team Bath Arena
19:30

2 May	Strathclyde Sirens	49–54	Severn Stars	Emirates Arena
17:00

=== Round 11 ===
2 April	London Pulse	44–64	Loughborough Lightning	Copper Box Arena
14:00

2 April	Strathclyde Sirens	40–57	Team Bath	Emirates Arena
14:00

2 April	Celtic Dragons	50–59	Manchester Thunder	Sport Wales National Centre
16:00

3 April	Surrey Storm	68–52	Severn Stars	Surrey Sports Park
16:00

4 April	Saracens Mavericks	62–43	Wasps	University of Essex Arena
17:30

4 April	Loughborough Lightning	62–54	Leeds Rhinos	Sir David Wallace Arena
19:00

=== Round 12 ===
8 April	Surrey Storm	41–66	Team Bath	Surrey Sports Park
19:30

9 April	Saracens Mavericks	37–29	Celtic Dragons	Hertfordshire Sports Village
16:00

9 April	Manchester Thunder	78–53	Severn Stars	Belle Vue
17:00

11 April	Leeds Rhinos	44–60	Strathclyde Sirens	Allam Sports Centre
17:30

11 April	Team Bath	62–41	London Pulse	Team Bath Arena
19:30

=== Round 13 ===
16 April	Loughborough Lightning	57–54	Surrey Storm	Resorts World Arena
13:00

16 April	Leeds Rhinos	51–55	Celtic Dragons	Resorts World Arena
14:45

16 April	Manchester Thunder	73–51	Strathclyde Sirens	Resorts World Arena
16:30

16 April	Wasps	38–44	London Pulse	Resorts World Arena
18:15

16 April	Saracens Mavericks	58–44	Severn Stars	Resorts World Arena
20:00

=== Round 14 ===
17 April	Team Bath	54–64	Leeds Rhinos	Resorts World Arena
12:00

17 April	Celtic Dragons	52–56	Loughborough Lightning	Resorts World Arena
13:45

17 April	Surrey Storm	50–80	Manchester Thunder	Resorts World Arena
15:30

17 April	London Pulse	53–46	Saracens Mavericks	Resorts World Arena
17:15

17 April	Severn Stars	56–47	Wasps	Resorts World Arena
19:00

=== Round 15 ===
Manchester Thunder's score of 88 points was a Netball Superleague record for most points in a match.

23 April	Team Bath	50–40	Severn Stars	Team Bath Arena
16:00

23 April	Loughborough Lightning	52–46	Strathclyde Sirens	Sir David Wallace Arena
19:00

23 April	Wasps	57–88	Manchester Thunder	Coventry Building Society Arena
19:00

24 April	Wasps	57–52	Leeds Rhinos	Coventry Building Society Arena
17:00

25 April	Celtic Dragons	49–52	London Pulse	Sport Wales National Centre
17:30

=== Round 16 ===
30 April	Severn Stars	38–53	London Pulse	University of Worcester Arena
18:00

30 April	Surrey Storm	55–52	Strathclyde Sirens	Surrey Sports Park
18:00

1 May	Wasps	65–52	Surrey Storm	Coventry Building Society Arena
16:00

2 May	Manchester Thunder	66–45	Team Bath	Belle Vue
17:30

2 May	Saracens Mavericks	51–59	Loughborough Lightning	Hertfordshire Sports Village
19:00

=== Round 17 ===
6 May	Leeds Rhinos	49–48	Surrey Storm	Allam Sports Centre
19:00

7 May	Celtic Dragons	57–51	Severn Stars	Sport Wales National Centre
16:00

8 May	Strathclyde Sirens	57–50	Saracens Mavericks	Emirates Arena
14:00

8 May	Leeds Rhinos	49–84	Manchester Thunder	First Direct Arena
16:00

9 May	Loughborough Lightning	52–46	Team Bath	Sir David Wallace Arena
17:30

9 May	Celtic Dragons	45–46	Wasps	Sport Wales National Centre
19:30

=== Round 18 ===
14 May	Saracens Mavericks	54–50	Surrey Storm	Hertfordshire Sports Village
14:00

14 May	Strathclyde Sirens	41–57	London Pulse	Emirates Arena
16:00

14 May	Wasps	52–54	Loughborough Lightning	Coventry Building Society Arena
19:00

15 May	Manchester Thunder	61–53	Saracens Mavericks	Belle Vue
17:00

16 May	Leeds Rhinos	56–55	Severn Stars	EIS Sheffield
17:30

16 May	Celtic Dragons	44–49	Team Bath	Sport Wales National Centre
19:00

=== Round 19 ===
20 May	Team Bath	43–41	Wasps	Team Bath Arena
19:30

21 May	Leeds Rhinos	62–58	Saracens Mavericks	Allam Sports Centre
15:00

21 May	Celtic Dragons	40–51	Strathclyde Sirens	Sport Wales National Centre
16:00

21 May	Loughborough Lightning	66–46	Severn Stars	Sir David Wallace Arena
17:30

21 May	Surrey Storm	38–45	London Pulse	Surrey Sports Park
18:00

23 May	London Pulse	50–59	Manchester Thunder	Copper Box Arena
17:30

=== Round 20 ===
27 May	Strathclyde Sirens	41–42	Wasps	Emirates Arena
19:30

28 May	London Pulse	52–45	Leeds Rhinos	Copper Box Arena
14:00

28 May	Saracens Mavericks	46–59	Team Bath	Hertfordshire Sports Village
16:00

28 May	Surrey Storm	58–52	Celtic Dragons	Surrey Sports Park
18:00

29 May	Severn Stars	40–48	Strathclyde Sirens	University of Worcester Arena
15:00

30 May	Manchester Thunder	71–63	Loughborough Lightning	Belle Vue
19:00

== Finals series ==
=== Semi-finals ===
3 June	Manchester Thunder	64–54	Team Bath	Belle Vue
18:30		Report; Stats

3 June	Loughborough Lightning	56–44	London Pulse	Sir David Wallace Arena
20:00		Report; Stats

=== Third-place play-off ===
5 June	Team Bath	36–32	London Pulse	Copper Box Arena
14:00		Report; Stats

=== Grand final ===
5 June; 16:15	Report; Stats	Manchester Thunder	60–53	Loughborough Lightning	Copper Box Arena
5 June; 16:15	Report; Stats	Scoring by quarter: 20–8, 16–15, 10–14, 14–15			Copper Box Arena

== Awards ==
Award	Name	Team
Player of the Season	Layla Guscoth	Team Bath
Players Player of the Season	Eleanor Cardwell	Manchester Thunder
Young Player of the Season	Funmi Fadoju	London Pulse
Coach of the Season	Karen Greig	Manchester Thunder
Fans Player of the Season	Eleanor Cardwell	Manchester Thunder
Top Scorer	Peace Proscovia	Surrey Storm
Umpire of the Year		
All Star VII
GS	Peace Proscovia	Surrey Storm
GA	Eleanor Cardwell	Manchester Thunder
WA	Natalie Metcalf	Manchester Thunder
C	Laura Malcolm	Manchester Thunder
WD	Beth Cobden	Loughborough Lightning
GD	Layla Guscoth	Team Bath
GK	Phumza Maweni	Team Bath
