= 2026 Netball Super League season =

- League: Netball Super League
- Sport: Netball
- Duration: 27 February 2026 – 20 June 2026
- Teams: 8
- TV partner(s): BBC & Sky Sports

Regular Season
- Season MVP: Jayda Pechova
- Top scorer: Samantha Wallace

Finals Series
- Date: 20 June 2026
- Venue: Co-op Live
- Champions: Manchester Thunder
- Runners-up: London Pulse
- Finals MVP: Sophie Fawns

Seasons
- ← 2025 2027 →

The 2026 Netball Super League season was the twenty first season of the Netball Super League, the elite domestic netball competition in the United Kingdom. London Pulse were the defending champions, as they won the 2025 Grand final for their first title.

Manchester Thunder won the competition, beating London Pulse in the Grand Final to claim their fifth title and first since 2022.

== Teams ==
Team	Home court(s)	Coach
Birmingham Panthers	bp pulse LIVE Worcester Arena Coventry Skydome Utilita Arena Birmingham	Sonia Mkoloma
Dragons	Cardiff City House of Sport M&S Bank Arena	Reinga Bloxham
Leeds Rhinos	Canon Medical Arena First Direct Arena	Lauren Palmer
London Mavericks	Brentwood Centre Brighton Centre Hertfordshire Sports Village OVO Arena Wembley	Camilla Buchanan
London Pulse	Copper Box Arena	Sam Bird
Loughborough Lightning	Sir David Wallace Arena Motorpoint Arena	Victoria Burgess
Manchester Thunder	AO Arena Belle Vue Arena M&S Bank Arena	Karen Greig
Nottingham Forest	Motorpoint Arena	Chelsea Pitman

== Table ==
2026 Netball Super League table
Pos	Team	Pld	W	L	GF	GA	GD	BP	Pts	Qualification
1	Manchester Thunder	14	12	2	934	771	+163	1	37	Qualifying for the Finals Series
2	London Pulse	14	12	2	873	755	+118	0	36	Qualifying for the Finals Series
3	Loughborough Lightning	14	11	3	1018	875	+143	2	35	Qualifying for the Finals Series
4	Nottingham Forest	14	7	7	873	892	−19	4	25	Qualifying for the Finals Series
5	Dragons	14	6	8	825	851	−26	4	22	
6	London Mavericks	14	4	10	775	812	−37	1	13	
7	Birmingham Panthers	14	3	11	719	896	−177	0	9	
8	Leeds Rhinos	14	1	13	737	902	−165	2	5	

Rules for classification: 1) Points; 2) Goal difference; 3) Number of goals scored;

== Results summary ==
Home \ Away	PAN	DRA	RHI	MAV	PUL	LIG	THU	FOR
Birmingham Panthers	—	50–62	39–54	49–76	35–61	60–76	48–58	54–70
Dragons	47–48	—	68–62	54–58	50–51	68–82	55–69	65–64
Leeds Rhinos	43–67	51–62	—	60–63	52–61	43–70	66–82	63–68
London Mavericks	69–68	50–57	54–44	—	49–55	58–66	47–60	59–60
London Pulse	78–45	67–66	75–44	56–46	—	75–71	56–51	73–63
Loughborough Lightning	83–69	75–60	79–55	73–56	68–61	—	68–58	65–76
Manchester Thunder	69–45	67–55	63–49	69–59	64–52	68–67	—	78–53
Nottingham Forest	68–58	57–62	61–51	57–49	51–62	74–75	51–78	—

Legend: Blue = home team win; Yellow = draw; Red = away team win.

== Finals series ==
=== Major Semi-final ===
6 June 2026	Manchester Thunder	60-56	London Pulse	National Cycling Centre
	{{{goals1}}}	Stats	{{{goals2}}}

=== Minor Semi-final ===
6 June 2026	Loughborough Lightning	77-57	Nottingham Forest Netball	Sir David Wallace Arena
	{{{goals1}}}	Stats	{{{goals2}}}

=== Preliminary Final ===
13 June 2026	London Pulse	60-56	Loughborough Lightning	Lee Valley VeloPark
	{{{goals1}}}	Stats	{{{goals2}}}

=== Grand Final ===
20 June 2026	Manchester Thunder	54-51	London Pulse	Co-op Live
	{{{goals1}}}	Stats	{{{goals2}}}

== Awards ==
Netball Super League End of Season Award Winners

Award	Name	Team	Ref
Players Player of the Season	(England) Jayda Pechova	Nottingham Forest Netball	
Young Player of the Season	(England) Jayda Pechova	Nottingham Forest Netball	
Coach of the Season	(New Zealand) Reinga Bloxham	Dragons	
Fans Player of the Season	(England) Jayda Pechova	Nottingham Forest Netball	
Gilbert Top Goal Scorer	(Trinidad and Tobago) Samantha Wallace-Joseph	Loughborough Lightning	
Amex Super Shooter	(Trinidad and Tobago) Samantha Wallace-Joseph	Loughborough Lightning	
NXT Gen Player of the Year	(England) Daisy Harrison	Team Bath	
Umpire of the Year	(England) Gary Burgess		
Assessors Award	(England) Alison Harrison		
All Star VII			
GS	(Trinidad and Tobago) Samantha Wallace-Joseph	Loughborough Lightning	
GA	(England) Ella Clark	Loughborough Lightning	
WA	(England) Alicia Scholes	London Pulse	
C	(Scotland) Iona Christian	Nottingham Forest Netball	
WD	(England) Taylor McKevitt	Manchester Thunder	
GD	(England) Jacqui Newton	Dragons	
GK	(England) Jayda Pechova	Nottingham Forest Netball	
