= Imogen Allison =

English netball player (born 1998)

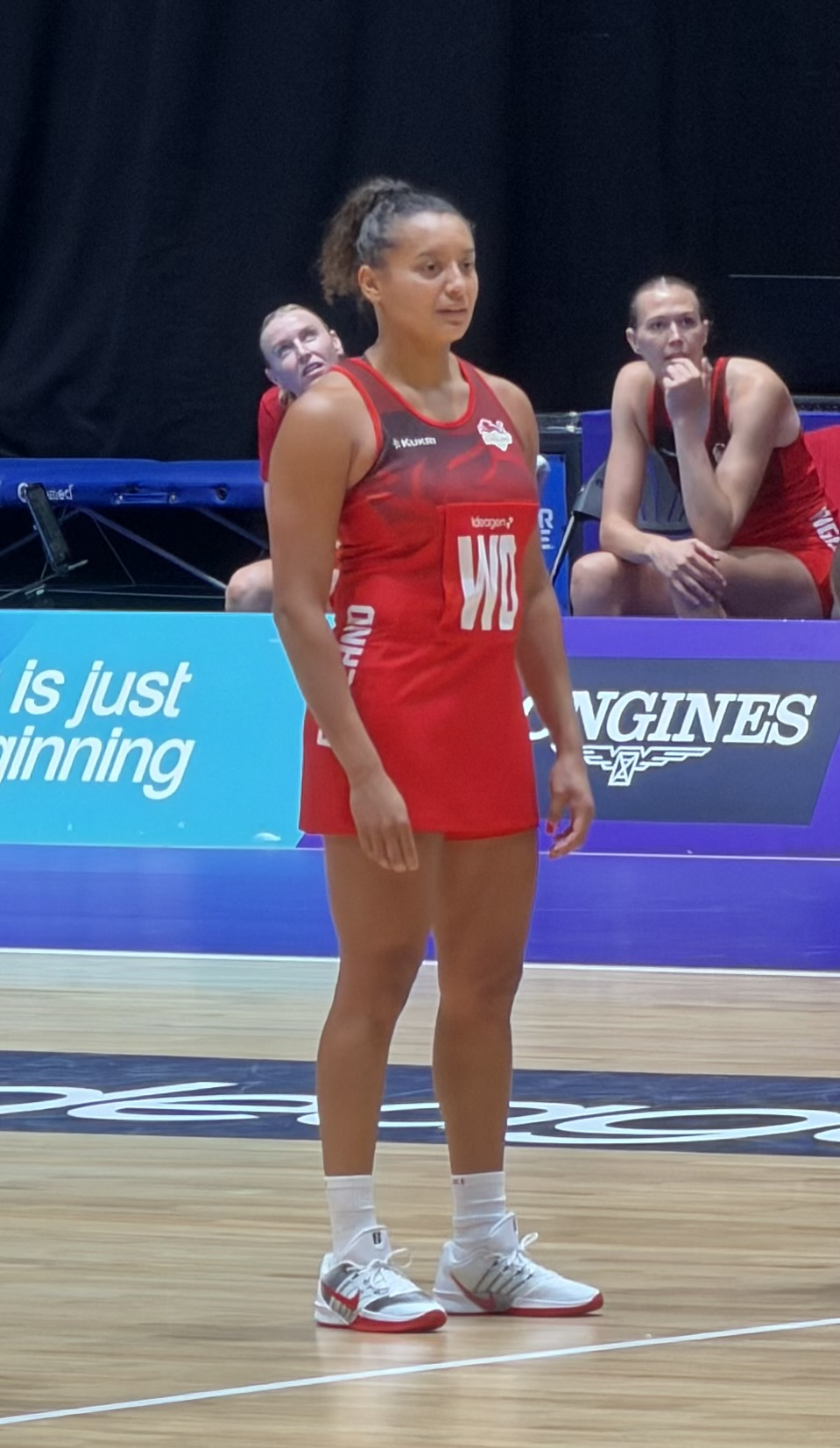
- Allison at the 2026 Commonwealth Games

Personal information
- Born: 24 April 1998 (age 28) Huddersfield, England
- Height: 1.73 m (5 ft 8 in)
- School: The Brooksbank School
- University: University of Bath

Netball career
- Playing positions: WD, C
Years	Club team	Apps
2016	Yorkshire Jets	
2017–2023	Team Bath	59
2024	Manchester Thunder	9
2025–2026	Queensland Firebirds	
2027–	Nottingham Forest Netball	
Years	National team	Caps
2014	England Academy	
c. 2017	England U21	
2020–	England	43
Medal record
Representing England
Netball World Cup
Silver medal – second place	2023 Cape Town	Netball
Netball World Youth Cup
Bronze medal – third place	2017 Gaborone	Netball

Imogen Allison (born 24 April 1998) is an English international netball player. She plays for Nottingham Forest Netball in the Netball Super League and is a member of the England national netball team.

== Early life and education ==
Allison attended The Brooksbank School and started playing netball in Year Seven. She later studied Sports & Exercise Science at the University of Bath.

== Club career ==
=== Yorkshire Jets ===
She played for Yorkshire Jets in the 2016 Netball Super League season.

=== Team Bath ===
She joined Team Bath ahead of the 2017 season. During the 2019 season, Allison was Bath's captain when regular captains Eboni Usoro-Brown and Serena Guthrie were away on international duty. She was shortlisted for the 2019 Superleague Young Player of the Year Award, and later re-signed for Bath for the 2020 season. She was named Bath's Player of the Year for the 2021 Netball Super League season and later captained Bath to win the 2021 British Fast5 Netball All-Stars Championship. She was named the team's captain for the 2022 Netball Super League season. Bath coach Anna Stembridge told Allison that she would be captain on FaceTime, as Allison was at the 2022 Netball Quad Series at the time.

=== Manchester Thunder ===
On 28 August 2023, it was confirmed that she would be signing for Manchester Thunder ahead of the 2024 season.

=== Queensland Firebirds ===
Allison signed with the Australian Queensland Firebirds ahead of the 2025 Suncorp Super Netball season. She signed a two-year contract with the Firebirds.

=== Nottigham Forest Netball ===
In June 2026 Allison was announced as a new signing for Nottingham Forest Netball.

== International career ==
Allison competed for England-under 21s at the 2017 Netball World Youth Cup, where the team finished third overall. She was a co-captain of the England A side for fixtures alongside the 2020 Netball Nations Cup.

She was in the England senior squad for a 2019 tour of Oceania, and also for the 2020 Taini Jamison Trophy Series. She made her debut for the senior team at the age of 22 in October 2020, coming on as a replacement for Jade Clarke. She played in the 2021 Vitality Roses Reunited Series and the 2022 Netball Quad Series. Allison was named as a reserve in the England squad for the netball event at the 2022 Commonwealth Games. On 17 July, she replaced the injured Beth Cobden in the England squad for the Games. Allison was part of the history-making and silver medal-winning 2023 Netball World Cup squad.

In June 2026 Allison was selected into the 2026 Commonwealth Games team.

== Honours ==
=== England ===
- Netball World Cup: Silver: 2023

== Individual awards ==
=== Netball Super League ===
- Young Player of the Year: 2019
