= 2023 Netball Superleague season =

British netball season

- League: Netball Superleague
- Sport: Netball
- Duration: 11 February - 11 June 2023
- Teams: 10

Regular Season
- Season MVP: Vicki Oyesola
- Top scorer: Mary Cholhok

Grand Finals
- Date: 11 June 2023
- Venue: Copper Box Arena
- Champions: Loughborough Lightning
- Runners-up: London Pulse

Seasons
- ← 2022 2024 →

The 2023 Netball Superleague season was the eighteenth season of the Netball Superleague, the elite domestic netball competition in the United Kingdom. Manchester Thunder were the defending champions, as they won the 2022 Grand final. The season began on 11 February and ended with the Grand Final on 11 June. It featured 10 teams following the removal of Wasps in November 2022.

Loughborough Lightning won the competition, beating London Pulse in the final to claim their second Superleague title.

== Overview ==
=== Format ===
Originally, the 2023 season was scheduled to have 11 teams. However, in November 2022, Wasps were removed from the league after their holding company went into administration, leaving the competition with 10 teams. The season began on 11 February and ended with the Grand Final on 11 June. The original fixture list was announced on 10 October 2022, and was amended in November 2022 to cater for the 10-team season. The first round of fixtures were all held at the Motorpoint Arena Nottingham.

=== Teams ===
Team	Base
Celtic Dragons	Cardiff, Wales
Leeds Rhinos	Leeds, West Yorkshire
London Pulse	Stratford, Greater London
Loughborough Lightning	Loughborough, Leicestershire
Manchester Thunder	Manchester, Greater Manchester
Saracens Mavericks	Hatfield, Hertfordshire
Severn Stars	Worcester, Worcestershire
Strathclyde Sirens	Glasgow, Scotland
Surrey Storm	Guildford, Surrey
Team Bath	Bath, Somerset

== Transfers ==
The original transfer window closed in October 2022. Team Bath re-signed former player Kadeen Corbin from Saracens Mavericks. Celtic Dragons signed Gabby Sinclair from Australian team Collingwood Magpies. London Pulse signed Jade Clarke and Chelsea Pitman. Loughborough Lightning signed Jasmin Odeogberin and Rhea Dixon. 2022 winners Manchester Thunder signed Lenize Potgieter. Thunder lost Eleanor Cardwell, Joyce Mvula and Laura Malcolm, all of whom chose to play abroad in Australia or New Zealand, as well as Jade Clarke, who transferred to London Pulse for the 2023 season. Saracens Mavericks signed Kira Rothwell from London Pulse. Strathclyde Sirens signed Ugandan international Stella Oyella, and Surrey Storm signed Layla Guscoth and Sophie Drakeford-Lewis from Team Bath.

Following Wasps' removal from the competition, the transfer window was re-opened to allow Wasps players to sign for other teams. Chloe Essam and Rachel Fee signed for Severn Stars, Georgia Lees signed for Saracens Mavericks, Josie Huckle signed for Manchester Thunder and both Lauren Nicholls and Alex Johnson signed for Loughborough Lightning.

== Table ==
2023 Netball Superleague table
Pos	Team	Pld	W	D	L	GF	GA	GD	Pts	Qualification
1	London Pulse (Q)	18	16	0	2	1078	867	+211	48	Qualifying for the Finals series
2	Loughborough Lightning (Q)	18	15	0	3	1169	938	+231	45	Qualifying for the Finals series
3	Manchester Thunder (Q)	18	15	0	3	1134	957	+177	45	Qualifying for the Finals series
4	Surrey Storm (Q)	18	13	0	5	1124	954	+170	39	Qualifying for the Finals series
5	Saracens Mavericks	18	8	0	10	959	1057	−98	24	
6	Severn Stars	18	7	0	11	960	1054	−94	21	
7	Leeds Rhinos	18	4	2	12	946	1066	−120	14	
8	Strathclyde Sirens	18	4	1	13	905	977	−72	13	
9	Team Bath	18	4	0	14	951	1184	−233	12	
10	Celtic Dragons	18	2	1	15	861	1033	−172	7	

== League stage ==
=== Round 1 ===
11 February	Team Bath	52–86	Loughborough Lightning	Motorpoint Arena Nottingham

11 February	Surrey Storm	68–56	Strathclyde Sirens	Motorpoint Arena Nottingham

11 February	Saracens Mavericks	55–59	Severn Stars	Motorpoint Arena Nottingham

11 February	Leeds Rhinos	48–64	London Pulse	Motorpoint Arena Nottingham

11 February	Manchester Thunder	68–42	Celtic Dragons	Motorpoint Arena Nottingham

13 February	Surrey Storm	76–51	Severn Stars	Surrey Sports Park

=== Round 2 ===
17 February	London Pulse	72–42	Team Bath	Copper Box Arena

18 February	Saracens Mavericks	62–57	Leeds Rhinos	Hertfordshire Sports Village

18 February	Surrey Storm	56–49	Manchester Thunder	Surrey Sports Park

18 February	Loughborough Lightning	65-51	Celtic Dragons	David Wallace Sports Hall

18 February	Severn Stars	51–60	Strathclyde Sirens	University of Worcester Arena

=== Round 3 ===
19 February	Leeds Rhinos	48–66	Surrey Storm	Leeds Beckett University

20 February	London Pulse	63–50	Severn Stars	Copper Box Arena

20 February	Celtic Dragons	54–45	Team Bath	House of Sport

20 February	Strathclyde Sirens	42–63	Loughborough Lightning	Sports Hall, Emirates

=== Round 4 ===
24 February	Loughborough Lightning	68–51	Saracens Mavericks	David Wallace Sports Hall

24 February	Celtic Dragons	40–61	Severn Stars	House of Sport

24 February	Team Bath	49–48	Strathclyde Sirens	Team Bath Netball Arena

25 February	London Pulse	51–58	Manchester Thunder	Copper Box Arena

25 February	Surrey Storm	68–56	Saracens Mavericks	Surrey Sports Park

=== Round 5 ===
3 March	Manchester Thunder	62–55	Loughborough Lightning	Belle Vue Arena

4 March	Saracens Mavericks	61–47	Celtic Dragons	Hertfordshire Sports Village

4 March	Strathclyde Sirens	52–52	Leeds Rhinos	Sports Halls, Emirates

4 March	London Pulse	52–47	Surrey Storm	Copper Box Arena

4 March	Severn Stars	67–50	Team Bath	University of Worcester Arena

=== Round 6 ===
10 March	Team Bath	54–80	Surrey Storm	Team Bath Netball Arena

12 March	Leeds Rhinos	52–67	Manchester Thunder	Leeds Beckett University

13 March	London Pulse	63–53	Strathclyde Sirens	Copper Box Arena

=== Round 7 ===
17 March	Manchester Thunder	76–57	Team Bath	Belle Vue Arena

17 March	Strathclyde Sirens	71–47	Saracens Mavericks	Sports Halls, Emirates

18 March	Severn Stars	56–63	Manchester Thunder	University of Worcester Arena

19 March	Loughborough Lightning	63–49	Leeds Rhinos	David Wallace Sports Hall

20 March	Surrey Storm	68–40	Celtic Dragons	Surrey Storm Park

=== Round 8 ===
24 March	Leeds Rhinos	51–53	Severn Stars	Allam Sports Centre

24 March	Team Bath	62–66	Saracens Mavericks	Team Bath Netball Centre

25 March	Loughborough Lightning	73–64	Surrey Storm	David Wallace Sports Hall

25 March	London Pulse	52–37	Celtic Dragons	Copper Box Arena

=== Round 9 ===
26 March	Saracens Mavericks	56–63	Manchester Thunder	Hertfordshire Sports Village

26 March	Severn Stars	42–79	Surrey Storm	University of Worcester Arena

27 March	Loughborough Lightning	49–55	London Pulse	David Wallace Sports Hall

27 March	Celtic Dragons	41–42	Strathclyde Sirens	House of Sport

=== Round 10 ===
31 March	Team Bath	61–54	Leeds Rhinos	Team Bath Netball Arena

1 April	Manchester Thunder	64–51	Strathclyde Sirens	Belle Vue Arena

2 April	Leeds Rhinos	55–46	Celtic Dragons	Huddersfield University

2 April	Severn Stars	41–61	Loughborough Lightning	University of Worcester Arena

3 April	Saracens Mavericks	43–65	London Pulse	Hertfordshire Sports Village

=== Round 11 ===
7 April	Celtic Dragons	43–59	Manchester Thunder	House of Sport

8 April	Team Bath	51–61	Severn Stars	Team Bath Netball Arena

8 April	London Pulse	66–34	Leeds Rhinos	Copper Box Arena

10 April	Strathclyde Sirens	61–65	Surrey Storm	Emirates Sports Hall

=== Round 12 ===
14 April	Team Bath	48–70	London Pulse	Team Bath Netball Arena

14 April	Strathclyde Sirens	49–52	Severn Stars	Emirates Sports Hall

14 April	Manchester Thunder	57–49	Surrey Storm	Belle Vue Arena

16 April	Leeds Rhinos	52–53	Saracens Mavericks	First Direct Arena

17 April	Celtic Dragons	48–65	Loughborough Lightning	House of Sport

=== Round 13 ===
21 April	Severn Stars	50–56	London Pulse	University of Worcester Arena

21 April	Team Bath	56–53	Celtic Dragons	Team Bath Netball Arena

22 April	Saracens Mavericks	51–63	Surrey Storm	Hertfordshire Sports Village

23 April	Loughborough Lightning	61–45	Strathclyde Sirens	David Wallace Sports Hall

24 April	Surrey Storm	65–49	Leeds Rhinos

=== Round 14 ===
28 April	Celtic Dragons	54–59	Saracens Mavericks	House of Sport

28 April	Leeds Rhinos	49–45	Strathclyde Sirens	Allam Sports Centre

29 April	Loughborough Lightning	65–57	Manchester Thunder	David Wallace Sports Hall

29 April	Surrey Storm	50–59	London Pulse	Surrey Sports Park

=== Round 15 ===
30 April	Severn Stars	62–56	Celtic Dragons	University of Worcester Arena

1 May	Saracens Mavericks	50–62	Loughborough Lightning	Hertfordshire Sports Village

1 May	Manchester Thunder	49–59	London Pulse	Belle Vue Arena

1 May	Strathclyde Sirens	69–47	Team Bath

=== Round 16 ===
6 May	Saracens Mavericks	41–38	Strathclyde Sirens	Hertfordshire Sports Village

6 May	Surrey Storm	66–45	Team Bath

6 May	Loughborough Lightning	57–51	Severn Stars	David Wallace Sports Hall

7 May	Manchester Thunder	65–63	Leeds Rhinos	AO Arena

=== Round 17 ===
12 May	Leeds Rhinos	56–72	Loughborough Lightning	EIS Sheffield

12 May	Celtic Dragons	47–48	Surrey Storm	House of Sport

12 May	Team Bath	63–67	Manchester Thunder	Team Bath Netball Arena

13 May	Strathclyde Sirens	46–53	London Pulse	Main Arena, Emirates

13 May	Severn Stars	50–54	Saracens Mavericks	University of Worcester Arena

=== Round 18 ===
19 May	Manchester Thunder	74–51	Severn Stars	Belle Vue Arena

19 May	Celtic Dragons	53–71	London Pulse	House of Sport

19 May	Surrey Storm	46–64	Loughborough Lightning	Surrey Sports Park

20 May	Leeds Rhinos	59–55	Team Bath	Allam Sports Centre

22 May	Saracens Mavericks	54–57	Team Bath	Hertfordshire Sports Village

=== Round 19 ===
26 May	Strathclyde Sirens	37–50	Celtic Dragons	Sports Halls, Emirates

27 May	Manchester Thunder	75–48	Saracens Mavericks	Belle Vue Arena

27 May	London Pulse	61–58	Loughborough Lightning	Copper Box Arena

27 May	Severn Stars	52–59	Leeds Rhinos	University of Worcester Arena

=== Round 20 ===
2 June	Celtic Dragons	59–59	Leeds Rhinos	House of Sport

2 June	Loughborough Lightning	82–57	Team Bath	David Wallace Sports Hall

3 June	Strathclyde Sirens	40–61	Manchester Thunder	Sports Halls, Emirates

5 June	London Pulse	46–52	Saracens Mavericks	Copper Box Arena

== Finals series ==
=== Semi-finals ===
9 June	London Pulse	55–42	Surrey Storm	Copper Box Arena
18:30

9 June	Loughborough Lightning	65–59	Manchester Thunder	David Wallace Sports Hall
20:00

=== Third-place play-off ===
11 June	Surrey Storm	38–55	Manchester Thunder	Copper Box Arena
14:00

=== Grand final ===
11 June; 16:15	Report; Stats	London Pulse	48–57	Loughborough Lightning	Copper Box Arena
11 June; 16:15	Report; Stats	Scoring by quarter: 17–13, 14–16, 8–14, 9–14			Copper Box Arena
11 June; 16:15	Report; Stats	Tchine 24/28 (86%); Neil 24/28 (86%)		Cholhok 44/48 (92%); Dixon 13/20 (65%)	Copper Box Arena

== Awards ==
Netball Super League 2023 Awards
Award	Name	Team
Players Player of the Season	Vicki Oyesola	Leeds Rhinos Netball
Young Player of the Season	Berri Neil	London Pulse
Coach of the Season	Jo Trip	Severn Stars
Fans Player of the Season	Jo Trip	Severn Stars
Top Scorer	Mary Cholhok Nuba	Loughborough Lightning
Umpire of the Year	Gary Burgess	
All Star VII
GS	Mary Cholhok Nuba	Loughborough Lightning
GA	Berri Neil	London Pulse
WA	Natalie Metcalf	Manchester Thunder
C	Jade Clarke	London Pulse
WD	Amy Flanagan	Surrey Storm
GD	Fran Williams	Loughborough Lightning
GK	Vicki Oyesola	Leeds Rhinos Netball
