= Nottingham Forest Netball =

Netball Super League team in Nottingham

- Full name: Nottingham Forest Netball
- Association: England Netball
- Founded: 2024
- Based in: Nottingham
- Region: East Midlands
- Home venue: Motorpoint Arena
- Head coach: Chelsea Pitman
- Asst coach: Sheonah Forbes
- Manager: Sian Foley
- Captain: Niamh Cooper
- Vice-captain: Natasha Pavelin
- League: Netball Super League
- Website: www.nottinghamforest.co.uk/nottingham--forest-netball/
Home	Away

Nottingham Forest Netball is an English netball team based in Nottingham which plays in the Netball Super League. The franchise is part of Nottingham Forest and was added in 2025 as one of two new entries in the relaunched “NSL 2.0”, which aims to professionalise the league.

== History ==
The franchise was announced in 2024, alongside Birmingham Panthers, as a new team for the relaunched Netball Super League. Part of Nottingham Forest the netball team is able to take advantage of the facilities and already professional structures in place.

Chelsea Pitman was announced as head coach in July 2024. In their debut season Forest were the only team to beat both Grand Finalists, London Pulse and Loughborough Lightning. Shooter Rolene Streutker was named NSL Player of the Year for the 2025 season as well as picking up the Gilbert Top Scorer Award, Soft & Gentle Super Shooter award and All Star 7 recognition. Defender Jayda Pechova was named 2025 Young Player of the Season also.

In the 2026 season Nottingham Forest qualified in the top four for the first time and progressed to the playoffs.

== Home venues ==
The Motorpoint Arena Nottingham was announced as the teams home venue.

== Players ==
=== Current roster ===
2027 Nottingham Forest roster
Players
Coaching staff

Nat.	Name	Position(s)	DoB	Height
(England)	Imogen Allison	WD, C	24 April 1998	1.73 m (5 ft 8 in)
(Scotland)	Iona Christian	C, WA	22 December 1997	1.67 m (5 ft 6 in)
(Northern Ireland)	Niamh Cooper (c)	WD, C	29 July 1992	1.76 m (5 ft 9 in)
(Jamaica)	Brie Grierson	WA, GA	8 April 1997	1.75 m (5 ft 9 in)
(England)	Berri Neil	GA, GS	12 February 2003	1.82 m (6 ft 0 in)
(England)	Natasha Pavelin (vc)	GD, WD	22 April 1998	1.85 m (6 ft 1 in)
(England)	Jayda Pechova	GK, GD	21 August 2004	1.83 m (6 ft 0 in)
(South Africa)	Ané Retief	GD, GK	9 September 1998	1.83 m (6 ft 0 in)
(South Africa)	Rolene Streutker	GS	20 October 2000	1.86 m (6 ft 1 in)
(England)	Anya Williams	GS, GA	19 October 2006	1.82 m (6 ft 0 in)

Head coach

- Chelsea Pitman

Assistant coach

- Sheonah Forbes

Manager: Sian Foley

Notes

- (c) – Captain
- (cc) – Co-captain
- (vc) – Vice-captain
- – Injury / maternity leave
- (TRP) – Temporary Replacement Player
Player profiles: Team website
Last updated: 2 July 2026

=== Internationals ===
==== England ====
- Imogen Allison
- Berri Neil
- Jayda Pechova

==== Jamaica ====
- Rhea Dixon
- Brie Grierson

==== Northern Ireland ====
- Niamh Cooper

==== Scotland ====
- Iona Christian
- Hannah Leighton

==== South Africa ====
- Ané Retief
- Rolene Streutker

==== Uganda ====
- Faridah Kadondi

== Head coaches ==
Coach	Years
Chelsea Pitman	2024-present

== Seasons ==
Season	League											Play-Offs
Season	Division	Tier	Pld	W	D	L	GF	GA	BP	Pts	Pos	Stage
2025	Netball Super League	1	14	7	0	7	926	916	1	22	5th	-
2026	Netball Super League	1	14	7	0	7	873	892	4	25	4th	Minor Semi Final
