= Layla Guscoth =

England netball international

Personal information
- Full name: Layla Guscoth
- Born: 2 March 1992 (age 34) Birmingham, West Midlands, England
- Occupation: Doctor
- Height: 183 cm (6 ft 0 in)
- University: St John's College, Oxford; University College London

Netball career
- Playing positions: GD, GK, WD
Years	Club team	Apps
2009–2010	Loughborough Lightning	
2010–2016	Hertfordshire Mavericks	
2010–2013	→ Oxford University	
2014–2016	→ UCL	
2016–2018	Team Bath	
2019–	Adelaide Thunderbirds	
Years	National team	Caps
2012–	England	26
Medal record
Representing England
Netball World Cup
Bronze medal – third place	2019 Liverpool	Team
- Updated on 17 April 2020

Layla Guscoth (born 2 March 1992) is an England netball international. She was a member of the England squad that won a bronze medal at the 2019 Netball World Cup. At club level, Guscoth has played for Loughborough Lightning, Hertfordshire Mavericks and Team Bath in the Netball Superleague and for Adelaide Thunderbirds in Suncorp Super Netball. She was a member of the Mavericks team that won the 2011 Netball Superleague. She has captained both Mavericks and Thunderbirds. In 2016 she qualified as a doctor.

== Early life and education ==
Guscoth was born in Birmingham, West Midlands and began playing netball at the age of 11. She discovered an interest in medicine during a hospital work experience placement in sixth form. Between 2010 and 2013 she studied medicine at St John's College, Oxford. In 2012 she was placed third in a top ten list of black students at universities in the United Kingdom. Judges included Trevor Phillips and David Lammy. In 2016 she completed her medical studies at University College London and was awarded a BMBS with Distinction. Guscoth also played netball at intervarsity level for both Oxford University and UCL.

== Playing career ==
=== Netball Superleague ===
Loughborough Lightning

During the 2009–10 Netball Superleague season, Guscoth played for Loughborough Lightning.

Hertfordshire Mavericks

Between 2011 and 2016, Guscoth played for Hertfordshire Mavericks. She was a member of the Mavericks team that won the 2011 Netball Superleague and in the grand final she was named player of the match. In 2014 she was voted the Netball Superleague Player of the Season after winning 59% of the vote in a Sky Sports poll. In 2015 she made her second grand final appearance for Mavericks. She captained Mavericks during the 2016 Netball Superleague season.

Team Bath

Between 2016 and 2018, Guscoth played for Team Bath. Guscoth was named the Team Bath Coaches' Player of the Year in both 2017 and 2018.

=== Adelaide Thunderbirds ===
Since 2019 Guscoth has played for Adelaide Thunderbirds in Suncorp Super Netball. Guscoth and her England international teammate Chelsea Pitman were appointed co-captains of Thunderbirds for 2019.

=== England ===
Guscoth made her senior debut for England in 2012 against Jamaica. She has also represented England at under-17, under-19 and under-21 levels, captaining both the under-17 and under-21 squads. Between 2015 and 2018 Guscoth took a break from playing for England as she concentrated on qualifying to be a doctor. Guscoth was a member of the England squad that won a bronze medal at the 2019 Netball World Cup. However she was injured in a group stage match against Scotland and she missed the remainder of the tournament.

Tournaments	Place
2013 Fast5 Netball World Series	6th
2015 Netball Europe Open Championships	1st
2018 Netball Quad Series (September)	2nd
2018 Fast5 Netball World Series	5th
2019 Netball Quad Series	2nd
2019 Netball World Cup	3rd place, bronze medalist(s)
2023 Netball Quad Series	3rd

== Doctor ==
While playing for Team Bath in 2017 and 2018, Guscoth also worked as a doctor at Royal United Hospital and Southmead Hospital. In 2019, while playing for Adelaide Thunderbirds, she also worked as a researcher/visiting lecturer at the University of Adelaide. During the COVID-19 pandemic, when the 2020 Suncorp Super Netball season was suspended, Guscoth volunteered to return to the United Kingdom to work at Queen Elizabeth Hospital Birmingham.

== Honours ==
Hertfordshire Mavericks

- Netball Superleague
  - Winners: 2011: 1
  - Runners up: 2015: 1

England

- Netball Quad Series
  - Runners Up: 2018 (Sep), 2019 2

Individual

- Netball Superleague Player of the Season
  - 2014
