= Chelsea Pitman =

Australian-born netball player

Personal information
- Full name: Chelsea Maree Pitman
- Born: 8 June 1988 (age 38) Paddington, Sydney, Australia
- Occupation: Netball Coach
- Height: 1.81 m (5 ft 11 1/2 in)
- School: St Andrew's Cathedral School

Netball career
- Playing positions: C, WA, GA
Years	Club team	Apps
2010	Canterbury Tactix	
2011–2013	Queensland Firebirds	
2014	West Coast Fever	
2015	Manchester Thunder	
2016	Central Pulse	
2017-2020	Adelaide Thunderbirds	
2022	West Coast Fever	
2022-2023	London Pulse	
2024	Giants Netball	
Years	National team	Caps
2011–2012	Australian Netball Diamonds	18
2017–2023	England Roses	50
Coaching career
- Years: Team
- 2025-present: Nottingham Forest Netball
Medal record
Representing Australia
Netball World Cup
Gold medal – first place	2011 Singapore	Netball
Representing England
Commonwealth Games
Gold medal – first place	2018 Gold Coast	Netball
Netball World Cup
Silver medal – second place	2023 Cape Town	Netball
Bronze medal – third place	2019 Liverpool	Netball
- Updated on 2018-04-18

Chelsea Pitman (born 8 June 1988) is an Australian-born netball player and coach who represented England and Australia at international level. She won a gold medal with Australia at the 2011 World Netball Championships and a historic gold medal with the English Roses at the 2018 Commonwealth Games. She predominantly played wing attack, but also played goal attack.

In 2025 she was announced as the head coach for new Netball Super League franchise Nottingham Forest Netball.

== Club career ==
Pitman's career began in New South Wales, representing the state at underage national championships before moving to the Australian Institute of Sport in Canberra where she was noticed by national head coach Norma Plummer.

=== Canterbury Tactix ===
In 2010, she was signed by New Zealand ANZ Championship franchise the Canterbury Tactix. However, in round 6 against the Northern Mystics, she suffered an ACL injury that ended her season.

=== Queensland Firebirds ===
After a successful ACL rehabilitation, she joined the Queensland Firebirds in 2011. Significant improvement throughout the season resulted in Pitman becoming the starting wing attack and helping the Firebirds win the 2011 ANZ Championship in an undefeated season. Her breakthrough season was capped off with selection in the Australian Netball Diamonds team for the 2011 World Netball Championships in Singapore, where Australia retained the title.

In 2013, Pitman was part of the Firebirds team who made it to the ANZ Championship Grand Final for the second time in 3 years where they were defeated by the Adelaide Thunderbirds 50–48.

=== West Coast Fever ===
At the conclusion of the season, she and Firebirds teammate Natalie Medhurst, announced that they had signed with the West Coast Fever for the 2014 season. Towards the end of the 2014, Pitman announced that she would take the following season (2015) off from the ANZ Championship to consider her netball future.

=== Manchester Thunder ===
In July 2014, she signed a one-year contract with Netball Superleague side Manchester Thunder for the 2015 season in England.

=== Central Pulse ===
For the 2016 season, she returned to play in the ANZ Championship, signing for New Zealand side Central Pulse.

=== Adelaide Thunderbirds ===
After the dissolution of the ANZ Championship in July 2016, Pitman signed with the Adelaide Thunderbirds for the 2017 Suncorp Super Netball season. Pitman starred for the Thunderbirds during their 2017 campaign and was ultimately named the 2017 Club Champion after a highly successful season. Pitman was a co-captain of the Thunderbirds in 2019 and 2020, sharing the role initially with English international teammate Layla Guscoth and later sharing it with Australian team-mate Hannah Petty. After the 2020 Suncorp Super Netball Season, Pitman was not offered a new contract by the Adelaide Thunderbirds. This resulted in her playing the 2021 season in Netball South Australia's Premier League competition for the Garville Netball Club.

=== West Coast Fever ===
After concluding her season playing for Garville Netball Club, Pitman returned to the West Coast Fever again, accepting a training partner position for the 2022 Suncorp Super Netball Season.

=== London Pulse ===
In June 2022 Pitman joined London Pulse of the UK Netball Super League, where she helped the team reach their first Grand Final. Loughborough Lightning went on to win the final.

=== Giants Netball ===
In 2024 she was contracted as a training partner and temporary replacement player for the GIANTS Netball playing in the Suncorp Super Netball. On 4 June 2024, Chelsea announced her immediate retirement from Domestic netball and played her last game against the NSW Swifts.

== International career ==
=== Australia ===
Pitman made her international debut against the Silver Ferns during a series of international matches prior to the 2011 World Netball Championships in Singapore. During the world championships, she featured regularly at wing attack in her first major international tournament. In the gold medal match against New Zealand, she was brought onto wing attack at half time when the Diamonds were six goals down and helped the Diamonds draw level at the end of regulation time to send the game into extra time. The Diamonds went onto win the match 58-57 and claim the world championship with Pitman playing a major role in the Diamonds' comeback.

She represented the Australian Netball Diamonds during the 2012 Netball Quad Series. However, she was unable to make a return to the national squad after this series.

=== England ===
In 2017 Pitman was selected into the England National Netball Team through her Yorkshire-born father. She later made her international debut for England against South Africa in the first 2017 Netball Quad Series, and helped them claim two historic wins over the New Zealand Silver Ferns in 2017. She was part of the England team which won the gold medal at the 2018 Commonwealth Games, defeating Australia in the final which was an historic moment for netball in England. In 2019, Pitman was selected in the England National Netball Team for the 2019 Netball World Cup where the team won the bronze medal. She was named in the England squad for the 2023 Netball World Cup where the roses won a silver medal.

== Coaching career ==
In July 2024 Pitman was announced as the head coach for new Netball Super League franchise Nottingham Forest Netball.

== Honours ==
=== Australia ===
- Netball World Cup: 2011

=== England ===
- Commonwealth Games: 2018
- Netball World Cup: Silver: 2023 Bronze: 2019
- Fast5 Netball World Series: 2017

=== Queensland Firebirds ===
- ANZ Championship: 2011, Runner up: 2013

=== London Pulse ===
- Netball Super League: Runner up: 2023
