= London Pulse =

Netball Super League team in London

- Association: England Netball
- Founded: 2016
- Region: London
- Home venue: Copper Box Arena; Queen Elizabeth Olympic Park; Stratford, London
- CEO: Sam Bird
- Head coach: Sam Bird
- Captain: Zara Everitt
- Vice-captain: Halimat Adio
- Premierships: 2025
- League: Netball Superleague
- Website: londonpulsenetball.com
Home	Away

London Pulse is an English netball team based at the Copper Box Arena in Queen Elizabeth Olympic Park, Stratford, London. Since 2019 their senior team has played in the Netball Super League, where they have made two grand finals, taking the title in 2025.

== History ==
=== National Performance League ===
London Pulse was originally founded in 2016. Former England netball international, Natalie Seaton founded the franchise and subsequently became the CEO. London Pulse initially entered under-17 and under-19 teams in England Netball's National Performance League. They also launched a campaign to become a Netball Super League franchise. In 2018 London Pulse won the National Performance League under-19 title after they beat defending champions, Manchester Thunder, 53–43 in the final. During the play-off tournament they also defeated the under-19 teams of other Netball Super League teams including Hertfordshire Mavericks, Wasps Netball, Surrey Storm and Team Bath.

In 2025 the U19 squad secured their third consecutive NPL title, with the U17 also winning the NPL title and 2025 NPL tournament. Pulse Power was the U19 NPL tournament champions.

=== Netball Super League ===
In July 2018 it was announced that London Pulse would replace Team Northumbria for the 2019 Netball Super League season. They are the first team in the Netball Super League to represent Central London. On 5 January 2019 London Pulse made their Netball Super League debut with a 51–49 win against Severn Stars at Arena Birmingham.

In May 2019, Sam Bird was announced as the new Head Coach, succeeding Te Aroha Keenan. She led the team to a fourth-place finish in 2022 and to the 2023 grand final where the finished second. They lost 48–57 to Loughborough Lightning. They won their inguagral grand final in 2025, defeating Loughborough Lightning 53–45. That season Pulse also topped the regular season table and won the inaugural Netball Super Cup in March. In 2026 Pulse made their third grand final where they lost to Manchester Thunder.

== Senior finals ==
Pulse made their Netball Super League Grand Final debut in 2023.

Season	Winners	Score	Runners up	Venue
2023	Loughborough Lightning	57–48	London Pulse	Copper Box Arena
2025	London Pulse	53–45	Loughborough Lightning	The O2 Arena
2026	Manchester Thunder	54-51	London Pulse	Co-op Live

== Home venue ==
London Pulse is based at the Copper Box Arena in Queen Elizabeth Olympic Park, Stratford, London.

== Notable players ==
=== 2026 Squad ===
2026 London Pulse roster
Players
Coaching staff

Nat.	Name	Position(s)	DoB	Height
(England)	Halimat Adio (vc)	GK, GD	27 January 1998	1.83 m (6 ft 0 in)
(England)	Zara Everitt (c)	WD	5 May 2000	1.83 m (6 ft 0 in)
(England)	Funmi Fadoju	GD, GK, WD	15 August 2002	1.76 m (5 ft 9 in)
(England)	Olivia Tchine	GS	22 November 2000	1.91 m (6 ft 3 in)
(England)	Alicia Scholes	WA, C	8 May 2001	1.63 m (5 ft 4 in)
(England)	Darcie Everitt	GK, GD	8 February 2006	1.87 m (6 ft 2 in)
(South Africa)	Kamogelo Maseko	GA, WA	30 March 2002	1.79 m (5 ft 10 in)
(England)	Sophie Kelly	GA, GS	28 November 2003	1.82 m (6 ft 0 in)
(Australia)	Tyler Orr	C, WA	21 January 2000	1.79 m (5 ft 10 in)
(England)	Gracie Smith	C, WD	2008	1.84 m (6 ft 0 in)

Head coach

- Sam Bird

Notes

- (c) – Captain
- (cc) – Co-captain
- (vc) – Vice-captain
- – Injury / maternity leave
- (TRP) – Temporary Replacement Player
Player profiles: Team website
Last updated: 2 January 2026

=== Internationals ===
England

- Funmi Fadoju
- Halimat Adio
- Lindsay Keable
- Jade Clarke
- Chelsea Pitman
- Olivia Tchine
- Berri Neil
- Ellie Rattu
- Alicia Scholes
- Zara Everitt

Northern Ireland

- Michelle Drayne
- Fionnuala Toner

Jamaica

- Adean Thomas

South Africa

- Sigrid Burger
- Nicholé Taljaard

== Head coaches ==
Coach	Years
(England) Amanda Newton	201x–2018
(New Zealand) Te Aroha Keenan	2018–2019
(England) Sam Bird	2019–

== Pulse power ==
In 2024 London Pulse announced an extension academy called Pulse Power, which operates in the South/South East region previously covered by Surrey Storm. This runs alongside the London Pulse academy which is based in East London with both pathways operating U17 and U19 teams in the Netball Performance League. The U19 team was the 2025 NPL Tournament champions.
