= Leeds Rhinos Netball =

Netball Superleague team

NIC Leeds Rhinos Netball
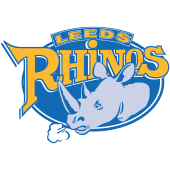
- Founded: 2017
- Based in: Leeds
- Regions: Yorkshire
- Home venues: First Direct Arena; Canon Medical Arena,
- Chairperson: Melissa Tomlinson
- Head coach: Lauren Palmer
- Asst coach: Maggie Birkinshaw
- Captain: Bethany Brittain
- League: Netball Superleague
- Website: netball.therhinos.co.uk
Home	Away

Leeds Rhinos Netball are an English netball team based in Leeds. They were founded in 2017. Together with the men's rugby league and women's rugby league teams, they are part of the Leeds Rhinos family of clubs. In 2018–19 they entered an under-19 team in England Netball's National Performance League. They joined the Netball Superleague in 2021.

== History ==
=== Foundation ===
Leeds Rhinos Netball was founded in July 2017 in partnership with the rugby league Super League club Leeds Rhinos and their charity, the Leeds Rhinos Foundation. Ashton Golding became an ambassador for the team.

=== National Performance League ===
In 2018–19 Leeds Rhinos entered an under-19 team in England Netball's National Performance League, competing against the under-19 teams of Netball Superleague teams. On 15 December 2018 they made their NPL debut with a 54–53 win against Mavericks. Leeds Rhinos subsequently finished fourth in their inaugural NPL season. They secured fourth place with a 63–55 win over Surrey Storm.

=== Netball Superleague ===
In June 2019 it was announced that Leeds Rhinos would start playing in the Netball Superleague in 2021. In August 2019, as part of their preparations for joining the Superleague, Leeds Rhinos appointed Dan Ryan as head coach.

== Home venues ==
In 2018–19, when Leeds Rhinos played in the National Performance League, they played their home matches at Leeds Beckett University. The Netball Superleague fixtures are played at Canon Medical Arena, Sheffield and First Direct Arena, Leeds.

== Players ==
=== 2026 squad ===
2026 Leeds Rhinos roster
Players
Coaching staff

Nat.	Name	Position(s)	DoB	Height
(England)	Harriet Jones	GA, GS	28 October 2005	1.80 m (5 ft 11 in)
(England)	Cassie Howard	C, WA, WD	14 August 2002	1.76 m (5 ft 9 in)
(Malawi)	Joyce Mvula	GS, GA	15 April 1994	1.80 m (5 ft 11 in)
(England)	Bella Baylis	C, WA	5 November 2003	1.65 m (5 ft 5 in)
(England)	Jasmine Brown	GK, GD	26 November 2001	1.88 m (6 ft 2 in)
(England)	Paige Reed	GA, GS	9 July 1997	1.78 m (5 ft 10 in)
(England)	Indya Masser	WA,C	23 April 2002	1.68 m (5 ft 6 in)
(England)	Yomi Wilson	GK	19 March 2004	1.87 m (6 ft 2 in)
(South Africa)	Sanmarie Visser	GD,GK, WD	23 October 2003	1.84 m (6 ft 0 in)
(England)	Niamh Kilgallen	C,WA		–

Head coach

- Lauren Palmer

Assistant coach

- Maggie Birkinshaw

Manager: Gerry Plant
Physiotherapist: Jen Craven
Strength and conditioning: Sarah Whitehead

Notes

- (c) – Captain
- (cc) – Co-captain
- (vc) – Vice-captain
- – Injury / maternity leave
- (TRP) – Temporary Replacement Player
Player profiles: Team website
Last updated: 02 Jan 2026

== Coaches ==
=== Directors of netball ===
Coach	Years
(New Zealand) Liana Leota	2023–2024

=== Head coaches ===
Coach	Years
(England) Emily Perry	2018–2019
(Australia) Dan Ryan	2019–2021
(Australia) Tracey Robinson	2022
(New Zealand) Liana Leota	2023–2024
(England) Lauren Palmer	2025–
