= 2016 Team Bath netball season =

Team Bath netball season

Team Bath netball
- 2016 season
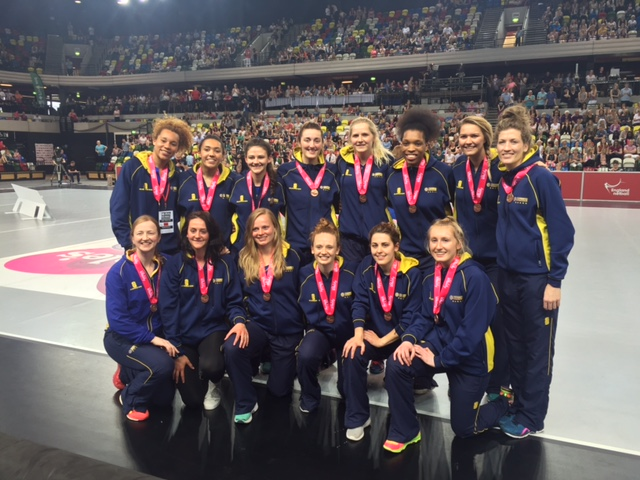
- Team Bath celebrate with their 2016 Netball Superleague bronze medals
- Head coach: Anna Stembridge
- Captain: Eboni Beckford-Chambers
- Main venue: Team Bath Arena; Sports Training Village; University of Bath

Season results
- Wins–losses: 11–5
- Regular season: 4th
- Finals placing: 3rd
- Team colours

Team Bath netball seasons
- ← 2015 2017 →

The 2016 Team Bath netball season saw Team Bath finish third overall in the 2016 Netball Superleague. In the third-place play-off, they defeated Hertfordshire Mavericks 49–48 to finish the season as bronze medallists. During the regular season, they finished in fourth place, level on points with Surrey Storm and Hertfordshire Mavericks, who were in second and third place, respectively. Manchester Thunder topped the table. Team Bath lost to Manchester Thunder 53–46 in the play-off semi-finals.

== Squad ==
2016 Team Bath roster
Players
Coaching staff

Nat.	Name	Position(s)	DoB	Height
(England)	Eboni Beckford-Chambers (c)	GD, GK	4 February 1988 (aged 28)	1.85 m (6 ft 1 in)
(Scotland)	Claire Brownie	WD, C, GD	10 August 1988 (aged 27)	1.74 m (5 ft 9 in)
(England)	Samantha Cook	GK, GD	21 March 1992 (aged 24)	1.81 m (5 ft 11 in)
(England)	Shaunagh Craig	GS, GA	5 April 1988 (aged 28)	1.87 m (6 ft 2 in)
(Singapore)	Asha Francis	GA, WA	20 March 1986 (aged 30)	1.78 m (5 ft 10 in)
(England)	Nicole Humphrys	WD, C, GD	29 September 1995 (aged 20)	1.80 m (5 ft 11 in)
(England)	Alana John	WD, GD		1.74 m (5 ft 9 in)
(Wales)	Chelsea Lewis	GS, GA	24 November 1993 (aged 22)	1.88 m (6 ft 2 in)
(South Africa)	Karla Mostert	WD, GD	12 March 1990 (aged 26)	1.81 m (5 ft 11 in)
(England)	Sarah Penny	GD, GK	4 January 1984 (aged 32)	1.85 m (6 ft 1 in)
(South Africa)	Lenize Potgieter	GS	2 May 1994 (aged 22)	1.87 m (6 ft 2 in)
(England)	Mia Ritchie	C, WA	7 February 1990 (aged 26)	1.65 m (5 ft 5 in)
(England)	Laura Rudland	GA, WA	6 November 1994 (aged 21)	1.74 m (5 ft 9 in)
(England)	Rachel Shaw	GA, WA	29 April 1992 (aged 24)	1.78 m (5 ft 10 in)
(Wales)	Amanda Varey	C, WA	5 November 1987 (aged 28)	1.67 m (5 ft 6 in)
(England)	Jo Vann	C, WA		–

Head coach

- Anna Stembridge
  Director Of Netball: Jess Thirlby

Notes

- (c) – Captain
- (cc) – Co-captain
- (vc) – Vice-captain
- – Injury / maternity leave
- (TRP) – Temporary Replacement Player
Player profiles: Team website
Last updated: 10 February 2020

== Preseason ==
Team Bath's Tri-Tournament

Team Bath hosted and won a Pre-season Tri-Tournament against Hertfordshire Mavericks and Surrey Storm.

14 November 2015	Team Bath	33–28	Hertfordshire Mavericks	University of Bath

14 November 2015	Team Bath	30–25	Surrey Storm	University of Bath
14 November 2015	Scoring by quarter: 10–3, 19–9, 26–16, 30–25			University of Bath

Mike Greenwood Trophy

Team Bath won the Mike Greenwood Trophy, defeating Manchester Thunder 19–14 in the final. In an earlier game against Manchester Thunder, they lost 19–17. The tournament featured games with two ten-minute halves.

28 November 2015	Team Bath	13–8	Team Northumbria

28 November 2015	Team Bath	14–8	Loughborough Lightning

28 November 2015	Team Bath	14–7	Celtic Dragons

28 November 2015	Team Bath	19–12	Yorkshire Jets

28 November 2015	Team Bath	17–19	Manchester Thunder

28 November 2015	Team Bath	19–14	Manchester Thunder

== Regular season ==
=== Results ===
Date	Opponents	Venue	Result	W/L/D
30 January 2016	Surrey Storm	Genting Arena	47–44	W
1 February 2016	Yorkshire Jets	Headingley Arena	38–58	W
12 February 2016	Manchester Thunder	University of Bath	37–62	L
19 February 2016	Team Northumbria	University of Bath	58–28	W
27 February 2016	Celtic Dragons	Cwmbran Stadium	45–65	W
29 February 2016	Hertfordshire Mavericks	University of Bath	42-56	L
4 March 2016	Loughborough Lightning	University of Bath	60–44	W
12 March 2016	Surrey Storm	Surrey Sports Park	54–42	L
18 March 2016	Yorkshire Jets	University of Bath	67–37	W
26 March 2016	Manchester Thunder	Manchester Thunderdome	69–51	L
28 March 2016	Celtic Dragons	University of Bath	60–42	W
9 April 2016	Team Northumbria	Northumbria University	41–51	W
16 April 2016	Hertfordshire Mavericks	Hertfordshire Sports Village	54–55	W
23 April 2016	Loughborough Lightning	Loughborough University	55–75	W

=== Final table ===
2016 Netball Superleague ladder
Pos	Team	Pld	W	D	L	GF	GA	GD	Pts	Qualification
1	Manchester Thunder	14	13	0	1	848	673	+175	39	Qualified for the play-offs
2	Surrey Storm	14	10	0	4	777	650	+127	30	Qualified for the play-offs
3	Hertfordshire Mavericks	14	10	0	4	769	653	+116	30	Qualified for the play-offs
4	Team Bath	14	10	0	4	768	669	+99	30	Qualified for the play-offs
5	Loughborough Lightning	14	6	0	8	719	720	−1	18	
6	Team Northumbria	14	4	0	10	613	770	−157	12	
7	Celtic Dragons	14	2	0	12	667	800	−133	6	
8	Yorkshire Jets	14	1	0	13	549	775	−226	3	

== Playoffs ==
=== Semi-final ===
30 April 2016; 16:00	Manchester Thunder	53–46	Team Bath	Manchester Thunderdome
30 April 2016; 16:00	Scoring by quarter: 17–6, 30–18, 43–30, 53–46			Manchester Thunderdome
30 April 2016; 16:00	Helen Housby; Eleanor Cardwell		Lenize Potgieter; Chelsea Lewis	Manchester Thunderdome

=== 3rd-place play-off ===
7 May 2016; 14:30	Team Bath	49–48	Hertfordshire Mavericks	Copper Box Arena
7 May 2016; 14:30	Scoring by quarter: 11–12, 26–24, 39–38, 49–48			Copper Box Arena

== Team Bath end-of-season awards ==
Award	Winners
Players' Player of the Year	Mia Ritchie
Coaches' Player of the Year	Mia Ritchie
Supporters' Player of the Year	Karla Mostert
Endeavour Award	Chelsea Lewis

== See also ==
- 2016 Surrey Storm season
