= 2015 Surrey Storm season =

Surrey Storm netball season

Surrey Storm
- 2015 season
- Head coach: Tamsin Greenway
- Captain: Hannah Reid
- Main venue: Surrey Sports Park

Season results
- Wins–losses: 14–2
- Regular season: 2nd
- Finals placing: 1st
- Team colours

Surrey Storm seasons
- ← 2014 2016 →

The 2015 Surrey Storm season saw them finish as Netball Superleague champions for the first time. Between 2011 and 2014, Surrey Storm played in three out of the four grand finals. After finishing as runners up in all three, Surrey Storm won their first Netball Superleague title in 2015. During the regular season they finish second behind Manchester Thunder. They subsequently defeated Yorkshire Jets at the semi-final stage before defeating Hertfordshire Mavericks in the grand final.

== Squad ==
2015 Surrey Storm roster
Players
Coaching staff

Nat.	Name	Position(s)	DoB	Height
(Australia)	Kathryn Ainsworth	WD, WA, C		–
(England)	Mikki Austin	C, WA	2 August 1993 (aged 21)	1.67 m (5 ft 6 in)
(New Zealand)	Laurelle Borck	C		–
(England)	Pamela Cookey	GA, GS, WA	2 September 1984 (aged 30)	1.78 m (5 ft 10 in)
(England)	Rachel Dunn	GS, GA	14 November 1982 (aged 32)	1.87 m (6 ft 2 in)
(England)	Amy Flanagan	C, WD	1 November 1993 (aged 21)	1.78 m (5 ft 10 in)
(England)	Becky Gentle	GD		–
(England)	Tamsin Greenway	C, WA, GA	6 October 1982 (aged 32)	1.76 m (5 ft 9 in)
(England)	Katie Harris	GS, GA	30 June 1994 (aged 20)	1.85 m (6 ft 1 in)
(England)	Katy Holland	GK, GD	19 February 1991 (aged 23)	1.83 m (6 ft 0 in)
(England)	Josie Huckle	GK, GD	24 September 1991 (aged 23)	1.88 m (6 ft 2 in)
(England)	Kat Hayes	GA, WA		–
(England)	Georgia Lees	WA	15 February 1994 (aged 20)	1.75 m (5 ft 9 in)
(South Africa)	Bongiwe Msomi	C, WA	19 January 1988 (aged 27)	1.66 m (5 ft 5 in)
(England)	Hannah Reid (c)	GD, GK		–

Head coach

- Tamsin Greenway

Notes

- (c) – Captain
- (cc) – Co-captain
- (vc) – Vice-captain
- – Injury / maternity leave
- (TRP) – Temporary Replacement Player
Player profiles: Team website
Last updated: 27 May 2020

== Pre-season ==
Friendly

27 October 2014	Surrey Storm	40–51	Wales	Surrey Sports Park

ReEnergise Tri-Tournament

29 November 2014	Surrey Storm	33–29	Hertfordshire Mavericks	Surrey Sports Park

29 November 2014	Surrey Storm	29–27	Team Bath	Surrey Sports Park

== Regular season ==
=== Results ===
Round 1

26 January 2015; 19:45	Report	Manchester Thunder	55–52	Surrey Storm	Manchester Thunderdome
26 January 2015; 19:45	Report	Helen Housby 34/37 (92%); Kathryn Turner 21/25 (84%)		Rachel Dunn 30/32 (94%); Pamela Cookey 22/25 (88%)	Manchester Thunderdome

Round 2

7 February 2015; 19:00	Report	Surrey Storm	74–51	Yorkshire Jets	Surrey Sports Park
7 February 2015; 19:00	Report	Rachel Dunn 58/67 (87%); Pamela Cookey 16/20 (80%)		Lottysha Cato 48/51 (94%); Natalie Haythornthwaite 3/3 (100%)	Surrey Sports Park

Round 3

9 February 2015; 19:45	Report	Team Bath	42–56	Surrey Storm	University of Bath	Sky Sports
9 February 2015; 19:45	Report	Rosie Allison 36/41 (88%); Asha Francis 3/6 (50%); Rachel Shaw 3/5 (60%)		Rachel Dunn 38/43 (88%); Pamela Cookey 18/19 (95%)	University of Bath	Sky Sports

Round 4

14 February 2015; 19:00	Report	Surrey Storm	66–49	Celtic Dragons	Surrey Sports Park
14 February 2015; 19:00	Report	Rachel Dunn 41/46 (89%); Pamela Cookey 16/18 (89%); Kat Hayes 9/13 (69%)		Chelsea Lewis 35/45 (78%); Cara Lea Moseley 8/11 (73%); Emma Thomas 6/7 (86%)	Surrey Sports Park

Round 5

21 February 2015; 18:00	Report	Loughborough Lightning	48–68	Surrey Storm	Loughborough University

Round 6

28 February 2015; 20:00	Report	Surrey Storm	69–35	Team Northumbria	Surrey Sports Park
28 February 2015; 20:00	Report	Rachel Dunn 43/53 (81%); Pamela Cookey 20/22 (91%); Katie Harris 6/6 (100%)		Jatjinda Kambatuku 16/22 (73%); Caroline O'Hanlon 8/14 (57%); Ellie Smith 7/9 (78%); Kayley Moss 5/6 (83%)	Surrey Sports Park

Round 7

7 March 2015; 18:00	Report	Surrey Storm	55–42	Hertfordshire Mavericks	Copper Box Arena; Attendance: 6,033
7 March 2015; 18:00	Report	Rachel Dunn 36/38 (95%); Pamela Cookey 19/22 (86%)		Louisa Watson 22/24 (92%); Kadeen Corbin 15/18 (83%); Sophie Hankin 4/7 (57%); Sarah East 1/2 (50%)	Copper Box Arena; Attendance: 6,033

Round 8

14 March 2015; 19:00	Report	Surrey Storm	47–58	Manchester Thunder	Surrey Sports Park
14 March 2015; 19:00	Report	Rachel Dunn 29/37 (78%); Pamela Cookey 18/21 (86%)		Helen Housby 39/40 (98%); Kathryn Turner 19/20 (95%)	Surrey Sports Park

Round 9

17 March 2015; 20:00	Report	Surrey Storm	61–39	Team Bath	Surrey Sports Park
17 March 2015; 20:00	Report	Rachel Dunn 41/50 (82%); Pamela Cookey 20/22 (91%)		Rosie Allison 21/23 (91%); Asha Francis 9/14 (64%); Shaunagh Craig 7/9 (78%); Rachel Shaw 2/2 (100%)	Surrey Sports Park

Round 10

20 March 2015; 20:00	Report	Yorkshire Jets	56–69	Surrey Storm	Leeds Beckett University

Round 11

28 March 2015; 16:00	Report	Celtic Dragons	30–73	Surrey Storm	Sport Wales National Centre

Round 12

4 April 2015; 19:00	Report	Surrey Storm	74–45	Loughborough Lightning	Surrey Sports Park
4 April 2015; 19:00	Report	Rachel Dunn 46/56 (82%); Pamela Cookey 23/26 (88%); Katie Harris 5/6 (83%)		Peace Proscovia 40/43 (93%); Flo Edwards 2/2 (100%); Vanessa Walker 2/2 (100%); Maryka Holtzhausen 1/1 (100%)	Surrey Sports Park

Round 13

6 April 2015; 14:00	Report	Hertfordshire Mavericks	41–59	Surrey Storm	Hertfordshire Sports Village
6 April 2015; 14:00	Report	Sarah East 25/30 (83%); Sophie Hankin 8/10 (80%); Louisa Watson 8/10 (80%)		Rachel Dunn 30/43 (70%); Pamela Cookey 29/33 (88%)	Hertfordshire Sports Village

Round 14

13 April 2015; 19:30	Report	Team Northumbria	20–86	Surrey Storm	Sport Central
13 April 2015; 19:30	Report	Jatjinda Kambatuku 4/7 (57%); Ellie Smith 1/1 (100%); Lisa Bowman 15/17 (88%)		Rachel Dunn 34/45 (76%); Pamela Cookey 30/33 (91%); Kat Hayes 11/13 (85%); Katie Harris 11/12 (92%)	Sport Central

=== Final table ===
2015 Netball Superleague
Pos	Team	Pld	W	D	L	GF	GA	GD	Pts	Qualification
1	Manchester Thunder (Q)	14	14	0	0	859	630	+229	42	Qualified for the play-offs
2	Surrey Storm (Q)	14	12	0	2	985	671	+314	36	Qualified for the play-offs
3	Yorkshire Jets (Q)	14	10	0	4	880	806	+74	30	Qualified for the play-offs
4	Hertfordshire Mavericks (Q)	14	8	0	6	747	666	+81	24	Qualified for the play-offs
5	Team Bath	14	5	0	9	606	631	−25	15	
6	Loughborough Lightning	14	4	0	10	688	747	−59	12	
7	Celtic Dragons	14	2	0	12	564	821	−257	6	
8	Team Northumbria	14	1	0	13	526	847	−321	3	

(Q) Qualified for the phase indicated

== Play-offs ==
=== Semi-finals ===
18 April 2015; 16:10	Surrey Storm	76–60	Yorkshire Jets	Surrey Sports Park
18 April 2015; 16:10	Rachel Dunn 43/49 (88%); Pamela Cookey 33/38 (87%)		Lottysha Cato 55/58 (95%); Natalie Haythornthwaite 4/5 (80%); Nikki Smith 1/1 (100%)	Surrey Sports Park

== Grand Final ==
25 April 2015; 18:10	Surrey Storm	56–39	Hertfordshire Mavericks	Copper Box Arena; Attendance: 6,000; Umpires: Gary Burgess; Jackie Mizon	Sky Sports
25 April 2015; 18:10	Scoring by quarter: 13–10, 26–20, 38–30, 56–39			Copper Box Arena; Attendance: 6,000; Umpires: Gary Burgess; Jackie Mizon	Sky Sports
25 April 2015; 18:10	Pamela Cookey; Rachel Dunn		Louisa Watson; Kadeen Corbin	Copper Box Arena; Attendance: 6,000; Umpires: Gary Burgess; Jackie Mizon	Sky Sports
