= 2019 Team Bath netball season =

Team Bath netball season

Team Bath netball
- 2019 season
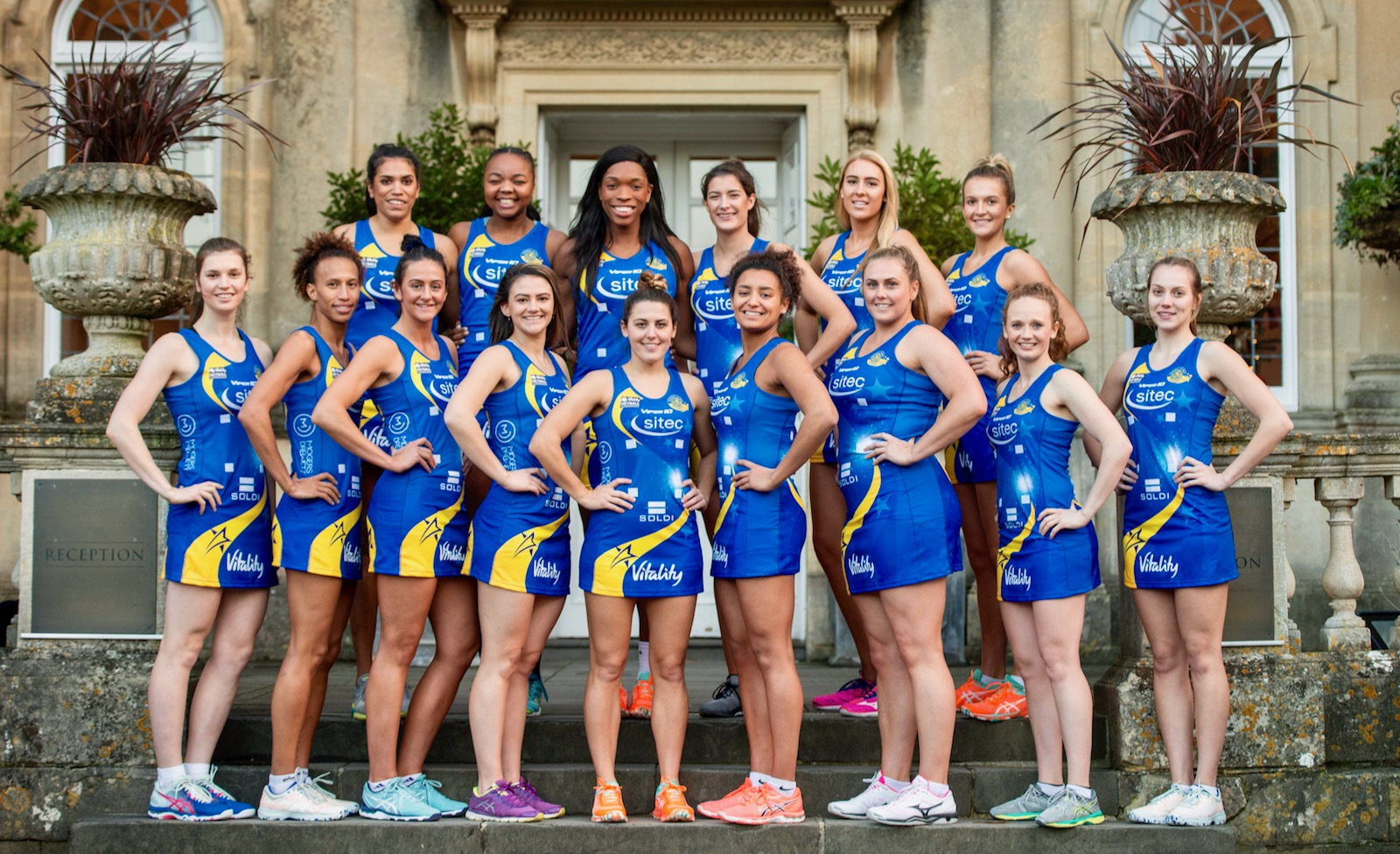
- Team Bath's 2019 Netball Superleague squad
- Head coach: Anna Stembridge
- Co-captains: Eboni Usoro-Brown; Serena Guthrie
- Main venue: Team Bath Arena; Sports Training Village; University of Bath

Season results
- Wins–losses: 14–6
- Regular season: 3rd
- Finals placing: 3rd
- Team colours

Team Bath netball seasons
- ← 2018 2020 →

The 2019 Team Bath netball season saw Team Bath finish third in the 2019 Netball Superleague regular season and qualify for the playoffs. In the semifinals they lost to the eventual overall champions, Manchester Thunder. Team Bath subsequently defeated Loughborough Lightning in the third place play-off.

== Squad ==
2019 Team Bath roster
Players
Coaching staff

Nat.	Name	Position(s)	DoB	Height
(England)	Imogen Allison	WD, C, WA	24 April 1998 (aged 20)	1.80 m (5 ft 11 in)
(England)	Summer Artman	GK, GD	27 April 1997 (aged 21)	1.88 m (6 ft 2 in)
(Australia)	Kim Commane	GS	15 September 1988 (aged 30)	1.80 m (5 ft 11 in)
(England)	Chartie Curtis	GK, GD		–
(England)	Sophie Drakeford-Lewis	GA, GS	10 December 1998 (aged 20)	1.79 m (5 ft 10 in)
(Australia)	Beryl Friday	GA, GS, WA	19 January 1994 (aged 24)	1.84 m (6 ft 0 in)
(England)	Serena Guthrie (cc)	C, WD	5 January 1990 (aged 29)	1.80 m (5 ft 11 in)
(England)	Hannah Passmore	C, WD	11 December 2000 (aged 18)	1.88 m (6 ft 2 in)
(England)	Mia Ritchie	C, WA	7 February 1990 (aged 28)	1.65 m (5 ft 5 in)
(England)	Abi Robson	WD, C	15 September 1998 (aged 20)	1.80 m (5 ft 11 in)
(England)	Laura Rudland	GA, WA	6 November 1994 (aged 24)	1.74 m (5 ft 9 in)
(England)	Rachel Shaw	GA, WA	29 April 1992 (aged 26)	1.78 m (5 ft 10 in)
(Wales)	Leila Thomas	GK, GD		–
(England)	Eboni Usoro-Brown (cc)	GD, GK	4 February 1988 (aged 30)	1.85 m (6 ft 1 in)
(Wales)	Amanda Varey	C, WA	5 November 1987 (aged 31)	1.67 m (5 ft 6 in)

Head coach

- Anna Stembridge
  Director Of Netball: Jess Thirlby

Notes

- (c) – Captain
- (cc) – Co-captain
- (vc) – Vice-captain
- – Injury / maternity leave
- (TRP) – Temporary Replacement Player
Player profiles: Team website
Last updated: 15 February 2020

== Preseason ==
=== Fast5 Netball All-Stars Championship ===
On 13 October 2018, Team Bath played in the Fast5 Netball All-Stars Championship. They were knocked out in the double elimination stage.

Double Elimination Stage

13 October 2018	Team Bath	23–18	Manchester Thunder	Copper Box Arena

13 October 2018	Team Bath	23–37	Wasps	Copper Box Arena

13 October 2018	Team Bath	21–47	benecosMavericks	Copper Box Arena

=== Friendly ===
9 December 2018	Team Bath	101–74	Knights Men's Netball	Sports Training Village

=== Tri-Tournament ===
On 15 December 2018 Team Bath hosted and won a three team tournament which also featured Surrey Storm and benecosMavericks. The tournament was broadcast live on BBC Sport.

15 December 2018	Team Bath	40–34	Surrey Storm	Team Bath Arena	BBC Sport

15 December 2018	Team Bath	46–32	benecosMavericks	Team Bath Arena	BBC Sport

== Regular season ==
=== Fixtures and results ===
Date	Opponents	H/A	Result	Win/loss
5 January 2019	Celtic Dragons	A	41–58	W
11 January 2019	Strathclyde Sirens	A	45–55	W
28 January 2019	Surrey Storm	H	50–56	L
9 February 2019	Loughborough Lightning	A	50–75	W
16 February 2019	Saracens Mavericks	A	68–45	L
22 February 2019	Wasps	H	46–57	L
1 March 2019	Manchester Thunder	H	60–56	W
11 March 2019	London Pulse	A	60–64	W
16 March 2019	Celtic Dragons	H	56–50	W
22 March 2019	Strathclyde Sirens	H	51–47	W
25 March 2019	Severn Stars	H	53–43	W
1 April 2019	Surrey Storm	A	48–57	W
6 April 2019	Wasps	A	61–46	L
12 April 2019	Loughborough Lightning	H	57–55	W
20 April 2019	Severn Stars	A	42–53	W
21 April 2019	Saracens Mavericks	H	45–51	L
27 April 2019	Manchester Thunder	A	53–56	W
4 May 2019	London Pulse	H	72–50	W

=== Final table ===
2019 Netball Superleague ladder
Pos	Team	Pld	W	D	L	GF	GA	GD	Pts	Qualification
1	Wasps (Q)	18	15	0	3	1092	844	+248	45	Qualified for the Finals series
2	Manchester Thunder (Q)	18	13	0	5	1111	913	+198	39	Qualified for the Finals series
3	Team Bath (Q)	18	13	0	5	999	933	+66	39	Qualified for the Finals series
4	Loughborough Lightning (Q)	18	13	0	5	1047	1022	+25	39	Qualified for the Finals series
5	Saracens Mavericks (Q)	18	12	0	6	1039	881	+158	36	
6	Severn Stars (Q)	18	7	0	11	888	933	−45	18 (Note: Severn Stars were deducted three points for fielding an ineligible player in Round 5.)	
7	Celtic Dragons (Q)	18	6	0	12	930	1043	−113	18	
8	Surrey Storm (Q)	18	6	0	12	906	1026	−120	18	
9	Strathclyde Sirens	18	3	0	15	803	995	−192	9	
10	London Pulse	18	2	0	16	889	1114	−225	6	

(Q) Qualify for the 2019 Fast5 Netball All-Stars Championship

== Playoffs ==
=== Semi-final ===
11 May 2019	Manchester Thunder	57–54	Team Bath	Manchester Thunderdome	Sky Sports
11 May 2019	Scoring by quarter: 18–14, 28–27, 44–39, 57–54			Manchester Thunderdome	Sky Sports
11 May 2019	Scoring by half: 28–27, 57–54			Manchester Thunderdome	Sky Sports

=== 3rd-place play-off ===
18 May 2019	Team Bath	62–56	Loughborough Lightning	Copper Box Arena	Sky Sports

== Team Bath end-of-season awards ==
Award	Winners
Players' Player of the Year	Kim Commane
Coaches' Player of the Year	Kim Commane
Fans' Player of the Year	Kim Commane
Endeavour Award	Sophie Drakeford-Lewis
