= 2018 Team Bath netball season =

Team Bath netball season

Team Bath netball
- 2018 season
- Head coach: Anna Stembridge
- Captain: Eboni Beckford-Chambers
- Main venue: Team Bath Arena; Sports Training Village; University of Bath

Season results
- Wins–losses: 11–8
- Regular season: 4th
- Finals placing: Semi-finals
- Team colours

Team Bath netball seasons
- ← 2017 2019 →

The 2018 Team Bath netball season saw Team Bath finish fourth in the 2018 Netball Superleague regular season. They subsequently lost to Wasps in a play-off semi-final. During their pre-season, Team Bath also played in the inaugural Fast5 Netball All-Stars Championship and finished as runners up after losing the final to Loughborough Lightning.

== Squad ==
2018 Team Bath roster
Players
Coaching staff

Nat.	Name	Position(s)	DoB	Height
(England)	Imogen Allison	WD, C, WA	24 April 1998 (aged 19)	1.80 m (5 ft 11 in)
(England)	Eboni Beckford-Chambers (c)	GD, GK	4 February 1988 (aged 30)	1.85 m (6 ft 1 in)
(England)	Kadeen Corbin	GA, GS	27 November 1991 (aged 26)	1.78 m (5 ft 10 in)
(England)	Sophie Drakeford-Lewis	WA, GA	10 December 1998 (aged 19)	1.79 m (5 ft 10 in)
(Singapore)	Asha Francis	GA, WA	20 March 1986 (aged 31)	1.78 m (5 ft 10 in)
(England)	Layla Guscoth	GD, GK	2 March 1992 (aged 25)	1.84 m (6 ft 0 in)
(Australia)	Josie Janz-Dawson	GD, GK	24 February 1988 (aged 29)	1.86 m (6 ft 1 in)
(Wales)	Chelsea Lewis	GS, GA	24 November 1993 (aged 24)	1.88 m (6 ft 2 in)
(England)	Tash Pavelin	GD, GK, WD	22 April 1998 (aged 19)	1.83 m (6 ft 0 in)
(England)	Paige Reed	GS, GA	9 July 1997 (aged 20)	1.77 m (5 ft 10 in)
(England)	Mia Ritchie	C, WA	7 February 1990 (aged 28)	1.65 m (5 ft 5 in)
(England)	Abi Robson	WD, C	15 September 1998 (aged 19)	1.80 m (5 ft 11 in)
(England)	Jess Shaw	C, WA	17 April 1996 (aged 21)	1.74 m (5 ft 9 in)
(England)	Rachel Shaw	GA, WA	29 April 1992 (aged 25)	1.78 m (5 ft 10 in)
(England)	Jazz Scott	C, WA	21 March 1994 (aged 23)	1.68 m (5 ft 6 in)
(South Africa)	Zanele Vimbela	GD, GK	28 April 1989 (aged 28)	1.80 m (5 ft 11 in)

Head coach

- Anna Stembridge
  Director Of Netball: Jess Thirlby

Notes

- (c) – Captain
- (cc) – Co-captain
- (vc) – Vice-captain
- – Injury / maternity leave
- (TRP) – Temporary Replacement Player
Player profiles: Team website
Last updated: 13 February 2020

== Preseason ==
=== Fast5 Netball All-Stars Championship ===
On 24 September 2017, Team Bath played in the inaugural Fast5 Netball All-Stars Championship. Team Bath reached the final but lost to Loughborough Lightning.

Double Elimination Stage

24 September 2017	Team Bath	19–18	Team Northumbria	The O2 Arena

24 September 2017	Team Bath	26–5	benecosMavericks	The O2 Arena

Semi-final

24 September 2017	Team Bath	34–26	Severn Stars	The O2 Arena

Final

24 September 2017	Team Bath	33–35	Loughborough Lightning	The O2 Arena

=== Tri-Tournament ===
On 6 January 2018 Team Bath hosted and won a three team tournament which also featured Severn Stars and Wasps. The tournament was broadcast live on BBC Sport.

6 January 2018	Team Bath	35–27	Severn Stars	Team Bath Arena	BBC Sport

6 January 2018	Team Bath	29–25	Wasps	Team Bath Arena	BBC Sport

== Mike Greenwood Trophy ==
Team Bath played three games at the 2018 Mike Greenwood Trophy tournament but failed to register a win. Traditionally a pre-season tournament, the 2018 event, was switched to April this season to act as a warm-up for the restart of the 2018 Netball Superleague season, following the five-week Commonwealth Games break.

14 April 2018	Team Bath	24–27	Team Northumbria

14 April 2018	Team Bath	24–31	Manchester Thunder

14 April 2018	Team Bath	20–31	benecosMavericks

== Regular season ==
=== Fixtures and results ===
Date	Opponents	H/A	Result	Win/loss
10 February 2018	Team Northumbria	A	39–52	W
19 February 2018	Celtic Dragons	A	35–54	W
23 February 2018	Surrey Storm	H	60–44	W
26 February 2018	Severn Stars	A	47–48	W
9 March 2018	Manchester Thunder	H	51–60	L
17 March 2018	Loughborough Lightning	A	54–59	W
22 April 2018	Wasps	A	61–44	L
29 April 2018	benecosMavericks	A	57–41	L
4 May 2018	Celtic Dragons	H	66–39	W
7 May 2018	Severn Stars	H	51–35	W
12 May 2018	Surrey Storm	A	56–51	W
21 May 2018	Team Northumbria	H	54–42	W
26 May 2018	Sirens	A	51–43	L
1 June 2018	benecosMavericks	H	54–45	W
4 June 2018	Sirens	H	60–34	W
8 June 2018	Loughborough Lightning	H	42–43	L
15 June 2018	Wasps	H	40–58	L
23 June 2018	Manchester Thunder	A	54–47	L

=== Final table ===
2018 Netball Superleague ladder
Pos	Team	Pld	W	L	GF	GA	GD	Pts	Qualification
1	Wasps Netball (Q)	18	16	2	1123	821	+302	48	Qualify for the play-offs
2	Loughborough Lightning (Q)	18	15	3	1054	852	+202	45	Qualify for the play-offs
3	Manchester Thunder (Q)	18	15	3	1056	887	+169	45	Qualify for the play-offs
4	Team Bath (Q)	18	11	7	922	849	+73	33	Qualify for the play-offs
5	benecosMavericks (Q)	18	10	8	979	912	+67	30	
6	Severn Stars (Q)	18	8	10	904	883	+21	24	
7	Surrey Storm (Q)	18	5	13	904	1004	−100	15	
8	Sirens (Q)	18	5	13	815	962	−147	15	
9	Team Northumbria (Note: London Pulse replaced Team Northumbria for the 2019 Netball Superleague season)	18	3	15	817	1022	−205	9	
10	Celtic Dragons	18	2	16	768	1150	−382	6	

(Q) Top eight qualify for the 2018 Fast5 Netball All-Stars Championship

== Playoffs ==
=== Semi-final ===
30 June 2018	Team Bath	39–54	Wasps	University of Worcester Arena
30 June 2018	Scoring by quarter: 7–12, 13–29, 25–41, 39–54			University of Worcester Arena
30 June 2018	Scoring by half: 13, 29			University of Worcester Arena

== Team Bath end-of-season awards ==
Award	Winners
Players' Player of the Year	Mia Ritchie
Coaches' Player of the Year	Layla Guscoth
Fans' Player of the Year	Kadeen Corbin
Endeavour Award	Jazz Scott
