= 2016 Surrey Storm season =

Surrey Storm netball season

Surrey Storm
- 2016 season
- Co-coaches: Kathryn Ratnapala; Tamsin Greenway
- Captain: Hannah Reid
- Main venue: Surrey Sports Park

Season results
- Wins–losses: 12–4
- Regular season: 2nd
- Finals placing: 1st
- Team colours

Surrey Storm seasons
- ← 2015 2017 →

The 2016 Surrey Storm season saw them retain the Netball Superleague title after defeating Manchester Thunder in the grand final. During the regular season they finish second behind Thunder.

== Squad ==
2016 Surrey Storm roster
Players
Coaching staff

Nat.	Name	Position(s)	DoB	Height
(Australia)	Kathryn Ainsworth	WD, WA, C		–
(England)	Mikki Austin	C, WA	2 August 1993 (aged 22)	1.67 m (5 ft 6 in)
(England)	Sophia Candappa	WA, C	18 August 1992 (aged 23)	–
(England)	Pamela Cookey	GA, GS, WA	2 September 1984 (aged 31)	1.78 m (5 ft 10 in)
(England)	Rhea Dixon	GS, GA, WA	5 November 1997 (aged 18)	1.78 m (5 ft 10 in)
(England)	Rachel Dunn	GS, GA	14 November 1982 (aged 33)	1.87 m (6 ft 2 in)
(England)	Amy Flanagan	C, WD	1 November 1993 (aged 22)	1.78 m (5 ft 10 in)
(England)	Katy Holland	GK, GD	19 February 1991 (aged 24)	1.83 m (6 ft 0 in)
(England)	Josie Huckle	GK, GD	24 September 1991 (aged 24)	1.88 m (6 ft 2 in)
(England)	Kat Hayes	GA, WA		–
(England)	Georgia Lees	WA	15 February 1994 (aged 21)	1.75 m (5 ft 9 in)
(England)	Yasmin Parsons	C, WA	13 July 1993 (aged 22)	1.70 m (5 ft 7 in)
(England)	Hannah Reid (c)	GD, GK		–
(England)	Francesca Williams	GD, GK	5 January 1996 (aged 20)	1.88 m (6 ft 2 in)
(England)	Elsa Wakeman	GA, GS		–

Head coach

- Kathryn Ratnapala
  Director Of Netball: Tamsin Greenway

Notes

- (c) – Captain
- (cc) – Co-captain
- (vc) – Vice-captain
- – Injury / maternity leave
- (TRP) – Temporary Replacement Player
Player profiles: Team website
Last updated: 31 May 2020

== Pre-season ==
Team Bath's Tri-Tournament

In November 2015 Surrey Storm competed in Team Bath's Pre-season Tri-Tournament, winning against Hertfordshire Mavericks before losing to the hosts. Storm finished second in the tournament.

14 November 2015	Surrey Storm	30–24	Hertfordshire Mavericks	University of Bath
14 November 2015	Scoring by quarter: 9–5, 14–12, 22–15, 30–24			University of Bath

14 November 2015	Team Bath	30–25	Surrey Storm	University of Bath
14 November 2015	Scoring by quarter: 10–3, 19–9, 26–16, 30–25			University of Bath

Friendlies

England	v	Surrey Storm	Loughborough University

Loughborough Lightning	51–54	Surrey Storm	Loughborough University

== Regular season ==
=== Results ===
Round 1

30 January 2016; 20:00	Report	Team Bath	47–44	Surrey Storm	Genting Arena
30 January 2016; 20:00	Report	Scoring by quarter: 11–13, 17–26, 30–38, 47–44			Genting Arena
30 January 2016; 20:00	Report	?		Rachel Dunn; Pamela Cookey	Genting Arena

Round 2

5 February 2016; 19:30	Report	Surrey Storm	57–35	Team Northumbria	Surrey Sports Park
5 February 2016; 19:30	Report	Scoring by quarter: 15–10, 27–20, 44–28, 57–35			Surrey Sports Park
5 February 2016; 19:30	Report	Rachel Dunn 34/45 (76%); Pamela Cookey 23/23 (100%)		Lynsey Armitage 16/21 (76%); Shanice Beckford 16/19 (84%); Gemma Sole 3/3 (100%)	Surrey Sports Park

Round 3

13 February 2016; 19:00	Report	Surrey Storm	59–36	Yorkshire Jets	Surrey Sports Park
13 February 2016; 19:00	Report	Scoring by quarter: 14–10, 26–19, 44–28, 59–36			Surrey Sports Park
13 February 2016; 19:00	Report	Rachel Dunn 46/58 (79%); Pamela Cookey 10/12 (83%); Kat Hayes 3/5 (60%)		Maria Lutua 22/31 (71%); Lucy Harris 9/12 (75%); Vanes-Mari Du Toit 5/7 (71%)	Surrey Sports Park

Round 4

20 February 2016; 19:00	Report	Surrey Storm	62–40	Celtic Dragons	Surrey Sports Park
20 February 2016; 19:00	Report	Scoring by quarter: 14–11, 27–22, 46–28, 62–40			Surrey Sports Park
20 February 2016; 19:00	Report	Rachel Dunn 48/58 (83%); Pamela Cookey 10/12 (83%); Kat Hayes 4/6 (67%)		Georgia Rowe 22/26 (85%); Afa Rusivakula 15/18 (83%); Leila Thomas 3/3 (100%)	Surrey Sports Park

Round 5

27 February 2016; 18:00	Report	Loughborough Lightning	55–54	Surrey Storm	Loughborough University
27 February 2016; 18:00	Report	Scoring by quarter: 14–13, 30–27, 42–40, 55–54			Loughborough University
27 February 2016; 18:00	Report	Peace Proscovia 37/40 (93%); Vanessa Walker 7/7 (100%); Kadeen Corbin 11/12 (92%)		Rachel Dunn 33/38 (87%); Pamela Cookey 21/24 (88%)	Loughborough University

Round 6

29 February 2016; 19:45	Report	Manchester Thunder	49–55	Surrey Storm	Wright Robinson College	Sky Sports
29 February 2016; 19:45	Report	Scoring by quarter: 14–12, 26–24, 35–40, 49–55			Wright Robinson College	Sky Sports
29 February 2016; 19:45	Report	Helen Housby 30/35 (86%); Natalie Haythornthwaite 19/22 (86%)		Rachel Dunn 37/42 (88%); Pamela Cookey 18/23 (78%)	Wright Robinson College	Sky Sports

Round 7

5 March 2016; 18:00	Report	Surrey Storm	50–55	Hertfordshire Mavericks	Copper Box Arena	Sky Sports
5 March 2016; 18:00	Report	Scoring by quarter: 10–10, 27–20, 34–40, 50–55			Copper Box Arena	Sky Sports
5 March 2016; 18:00	Report	Rachel Dunn 30/37 (81%); Pamela Cookey 20/24 (83%)		Sophie Hankin 15/21 (71%); Samantha Wallace 40/44 (91%)	Copper Box Arena	Sky Sports

Round 8

12 March 2016; 19:00	Report	Surrey Storm	54–42	Team Bath	Surrey Sports Park
12 March 2016; 19:00	Report	Scoring by quarter: 18–9, 30–20, 39–30, 54–42			Surrey Sports Park
12 March 2016; 19:00	Report	Rachel Dunn 36/41 (88%); Pamela Cookey 18/22 (82%)		Lenize Potgieter 25/30 (83%); Rachel Shaw 4/5 (80%); Chelsea Lewis 13/17 (76%)	Surrey Sports Park

Round 9

14 March 2016; 19:45	Report	Team Northumbria	45–58	Surrey Storm	Sport Central	Sky Sports
14 March 2016; 19:45	Report	Scoring by quarter: 18–9, 30–20, 39–30, 54–42			Sport Central	Sky Sports
14 March 2016; 19:45	Report	Chiara Semple; Lynsey Armitage; Shanice Beckford		Rachel Dunn 34/38 (89%); Pamela Cookey 17/19 (89%)	Sport Central	Sky Sports

Round 10

26 March 2016; 16:00	Report	Yorkshire Jets	39–56	Surrey Storm	Leeds Beckett University
26 March 2016; 16:00	Report	Scoring by quarter: 11–13, 18–29, 28–43, 39–56			Leeds Beckett University
26 March 2016; 16:00	Report	Alex Kirk 21/28 (75%); Lucy Harris 7/9 (78%); Maria Lutua 11/12 (92%)		Rachel Dunn 37/45 (82%); Pamela Cookey 19/25 (76%)	Leeds Beckett University

Round 11

2 April 2016; 19:00	Report	Surrey Storm	52–42	Loughborough Lightning	Surrey Sports Park
2 April 2016; 19:00	Report	Scoring by quarter: 12–10, 24–23, 35–34, 52–42			Surrey Sports Park
2 April 2016; 19:00	Report	Rachel Dunn 23/27 (85%); Pamela Cookey 29/34 (85%)		Peace Proscovia 19/24 (79%); Vanessa Walker 15/18 (83%); Kadeen Corbin 8/12 (67%)	Surrey Sports Park

Round 12

9 April 2016; 16:00	Celtic Dragons	53–68	Surrey Storm	Sport Wales National Centre
9 April 2016; 16:00	Scoring by quarter: 16–17, 29–32, 40–53, 53–68			Sport Wales National Centre
9 April 2016; 16:00	Georgia Rowe 22/24 (92%); Afa Rusivakula 27/36 (75%); Leila Thomas 4/5 (80%)		Rachel Dunn 38/42 (90%); Pamela Cookey 28/31 (90%); Kat Hayes 2/4 (50%)	Sport Wales National Centre

Round 13

16 April 2016; 19:00	Report	Surrey Storm	56–64	Manchester Thunder	Surrey Sports Park
16 April 2016; 19:00	Report	Scoring by quarter: 11–14, 26–32, 41–50, 56–64			Surrey Sports Park
16 April 2016; 19:00	Report	Rachel Dunn 28/30 (93%); Pamela Cookey 28/29 (97%)		Eleanor Cardwell 41/43 (95%); Helen Housby 23/27 (85%)	Surrey Sports Park

Round 14

23 April 2016; 18:30	Report	Hertfordshire Mavericks	48–52	Surrey Storm	Hertfordshire Sports Village
23 April 2016; 18:30	Report	Scoring by quarter: 14–8, 28–23, 39–37, 48–52			Hertfordshire Sports Village
23 April 2016; 18:30	Report	Samantha Wallace 40/44 (91%); Ella Clark 8/12 (67%); George Fisher 2/2 (100%)		Rachel Dunn 20/22 (91%); Pamela Cookey 32/35 (91%)	Hertfordshire Sports Village

=== Final table ===
2016 Netball Superleague ladder
Pos	Team	Pld	W	D	L	GF	GA	GD	Pts	Qualification
1	Manchester Thunder	14	13	0	1	848	673	+175	39	Qualified for the play-offs
2	Surrey Storm	14	10	0	4	777	650	+127	30	Qualified for the play-offs
3	Hertfordshire Mavericks	14	10	0	4	769	653	+116	30	Qualified for the play-offs
4	Team Bath	14	10	0	4	768	669	+99	30	Qualified for the play-offs
5	Loughborough Lightning	14	6	0	8	719	720	−1	18	
6	Team Northumbria	14	4	0	10	613	770	−157	12	
7	Celtic Dragons	14	2	0	12	667	800	−133	6	
8	Yorkshire Jets	14	1	0	13	549	775	−226	3	

== Play-offs ==
=== Semi-finals ===
30 April 2016; 18:00	Surrey Storm	53–51	Hertfordshire Mavericks	Surrey Sports Park
30 April 2016; 18:00	Scoring by quarter: 11–13, 24–26, 40–39, 53–51			Surrey Sports Park
30 April 2016; 18:00	Rachel Dunn 35/36 (97%); Pamela Cookey 18/21 (86%)		Samantha Wallace 41/46 (89%); Ella Clark 10/13 (77%)	Surrey Sports Park

== Grand Final ==
7 May 2016; 17:00	Surrey Storm	55–53	Manchester Thunder	Copper Box Arena	Sky Sports
7 May 2016; 17:00	Scoring by quarter: 15–9, 32–19, 43–36, 55–53			Copper Box Arena	Sky Sports
7 May 2016; 17:00	Pamela Cookey 28/31 (90%); Rachel Dunn 27/32 (84%)		Helen Housby 38/39 (97%); Kathryn Turner 8/10 (80%); Eleanor Cardwell 7/10 (70%)	Copper Box Arena	Sky Sports

== See also ==
- 2016 Team Bath netball season
- 2015 Surrey Storm season
