= 2020 Team Bath netball season =

Team Bath netball season

Team Bath netball
- 2020 season
- Co-coaches: Anna Stembridge; Jo Vann
- Captain: Kim Commane
- Vice-captain: Summer Artman
- Main venue: Team Bath Arena; Sports Training Village; University of Bath
- Team colours

Team Bath netball seasons
- ← 2019 2021 →

The 2020 Team Bath netball season will see Team Bath play in the 2020 Netball Superleague.

== Squad ==
2020 Team Bath roster
Players
Coaching staff

Nat.	Name	Position(s)	DoB	Height
(England)	Imogen Allison	WD, C, WA	24 April 1998 (aged 21)	1.80 m (5 ft 11 in)
(England)	Summer Artman (vc)	GK, GD	27 April 1997 (aged 22)	1.88 m (6 ft 2 in)
(South Africa)	Khanyisa Chawane	C, WA	14 January 1996 (aged 24)	1.69 m (5 ft 7 in)
(Australia)	Kim Commane (c)	GS	15 September 1988 (aged 31)	1.80 m (5 ft 11 in)
(Wales)	Betsy Creak	GS, GA	29 April 1992 (aged 27)	1.78 m (5 ft 10 in)
(England)	Sophie Drakeford-Lewis	GA, GS	10 December 1998 (aged 21)	1.79 m (5 ft 10 in)
(England)	Rachael Fee	GK, GD		–
(England)	Hannah Passmore	C, WD	11 December 2000 (aged 19)	1.88 m (6 ft 2 in)
(England)	Tash Pavelin	GD, GK, WD	22 April 1998 (aged 21)	1.83 m (6 ft 0 in)
(England)	Mia Ritchie	C, WA	7 February 1990 (aged 30)	1.65 m (5 ft 5 in)
(England)	Abi Robson	WD, C	15 September 1998 (aged 21)	1.80 m (5 ft 11 in)
(England)	Laura Rudland	GA, WA	6 November 1994 (aged 25)	1.74 m (5 ft 9 in)
(England)	Rachel Shaw	GA, WA	29 April 1992 (aged 27)	1.78 m (5 ft 10 in)
(Northern Ireland)	Fionnuala Toner	WD, GD	6 March 1990 (aged 29)	1.76 m (5 ft 9 in)
(England)	Eboni Usoro-Brown (injured)	GD, GK	4 February 1988 (aged 32)	1.85 m (6 ft 1 in)

Head coach

- Anna Stembridge

Notes

- (c) – Captain
- (cc) – Co-captain
- (vc) – Vice-captain
- – Injury / maternity leave
- (TRP) – Temporary Replacement Player
Player profiles: Team website
Last updated: 17 February 2020

== Preseason ==
=== Fast5 Netball All-Stars Championship ===
On 12 October 2019, Team Bath played in the Fast5 Netball All-Stars Championship. They were knocked out in the double elimination stage after losing two games.

Double Elimination Stage

12 October 2019	Team Bath	28–40	Celtic Dragons	Copper Box Arena	Sky Sports

12 October 2019	Team Bath	23–36	Saracens Mavericks	Copper Box Arena	Sky Sports

=== The Big Showdown ===
Team Bath relaunched their pre-season Tri-Tournament as The Big Showdown. The number of entrants was expanded from three to six. The winners were also awarded the Lyn Gunson Trophy, named after the former Team Bath and England head coach, Lyn Gunson. After winning five of their six group stage games, Team Bath qualified for the final but lost 33–27 to Saracens Mavericks.

Day One

7 December 2019	Team Bath	36–23	Severn Stars	Team Bath Arena

7 December 2019	Team Bath	38–28	Knights Men's Netball	Team Bath Arena

7 December 2019	Team Bath	28–27	Strathclyde Sirens	Team Bath Arena

Day Two

8 December 2019	Team Bath	21–37	Saracens Mavericks	Team Bath Arena

8 December 2019	Team Bath	42–21	Surrey Storm	Team Bath Arena

Final

8 December 2019	Team Bath	27–33	Saracens Mavericks	Team Bath Arena

=== Mike Greenwood Trophy ===
Team Bath played three games at the 2019 Mike Greenwood Trophy tournament, winning one and losing two.

14 December 2019	Team Bath	34–27	Loughborough Lightning

14 December 2019	Team Bath	26–42	Saracens Mavericks

14 December 2019	Team Bath	29–48	Manchester Thunder

== Regular season ==
=== Fixtures and results ===
Date	Opponents	H/A	Result	Win/loss
22 February 2020	Loughborough Lightning	H		
29 February 2020	Celtic Dragons	A		
6 March 2020	Wasps	H		
16 March 2020	London Pulse	H		
20 March 2020	Strathclyde Sirens	A		
30 March 2020	Manchester Thunder	H		
6 April 2020	Saracens Mavericks	A		
11 April 2020	Severn Stars	H		
18 April 2020	Loughborough Lightning	A		
24 April 2020	Surrey Storm	H		
29 April 2020	Celtic Dragons	H		
4 May 2020	Wasps	A		
10 May 2020	London Pulse	A		
15 May 2020	Strathclyde Sirens	H		
25 May 2020	Manchester Thunder	A		
1 June 2020	Saracens Mavericks	H		
3 June 2020	Severn Stars	A		
8 June 2020	Loughborough Lightning	H		
15 June 2020	Surrey Storm	A		

== Team Bath end-of-season awards ==
Award	Winners
Players' Player of the Year	
Coaches' Player of the Year	
Fans' Player of the Year	
Endeavour Award	
