= 2016 Netball Superleague season =

Netball Superleague season

- League: Netball Superleague
- Teams: 8
- TV partner: Sky Sports
- Champions: Surrey Storm
- Runners-up: Manchester Thunder
- Season MVP: Samantha Wallace (Hertfordshire Mavericks)

Seasons
- ← 2015 2017 →

The 2016 Netball Superleague season (known for sponsorship reasons as the Vitality Netball Superleague) was the eleventh season of the Netball Superleague. The league was won by Surrey Storm after defeating Manchester Thunder in the grand final. Thunder finished top of the table following the regular season. The league was sponsored by VitalityHealth.

== Teams ==
This was Yorkshire Jets final season in the Netball Superleague. In June 2016 England Netball announced that Jets had lost their place in the league.

2016 Superleague teams	Home venue/base	Country/Region
Celtic Dragons	Sport Wales National Centre	Wales
Hertfordshire Mavericks	University of Hertfordshire	East of England
Loughborough Lightning	Loughborough University	East Midlands
Manchester Thunder	Wright Robinson College	North West England
Team Bath	University of Bath	South West England/West of England
Team Northumbria	Sport Central	North East England
Surrey Storm	University of Surrey	Greater London/South East England
Yorkshire Jets	Hull / Leeds / Sheffield	Yorkshire

== Regular season ==
The opening day of the regular season saw the introduction of Super Saturday. This saw the eight teams play all four Round 1 games at the Genting Arena in front of a 7,500 crowd. During the season Sky Sports broadcast several matches live on Monday nights. Manchester Thunder finished top of the table following the regular season.

=== Final table ===
2016 Netball Superleague ladder
Pos	Team	Pld	W	D	L	GF	GA	GD	Pts	Qualification
1	Manchester Thunder	14	13	0	1	848	673	+175	39	Qualified for the play-offs
2	Surrey Storm	14	10	0	4	777	650	+127	30	Qualified for the play-offs
3	Hertfordshire Mavericks	14	10	0	4	769	653	+116	30	Qualified for the play-offs
4	Team Bath	14	10	0	4	768	669	+99	30	Qualified for the play-offs
5	Loughborough Lightning	14	6	0	8	719	720	−1	18	
6	Team Northumbria	14	4	0	10	613	770	−157	12	
7	Celtic Dragons	14	2	0	12	667	800	−133	6	
8	Yorkshire Jets	14	1	0	13	549	775	−226	3	

== Play-offs ==
=== Semi-finals ===
30 April 2016; 16:00	Manchester Thunder	53–46	Team Bath	Manchester Thunderdome
30 April 2016; 16:00	Scoring by quarter: 17–6, 30–18, 43–30, 53–46			Manchester Thunderdome
30 April 2016; 16:00	Helen Housby; Eleanor Cardwell		Lenize Potgieter; Chelsea Lewis	Manchester Thunderdome

30 April 2016; 18:00	Surrey Storm	53–51	Hertfordshire Mavericks	Surrey Sports Park
30 April 2016; 18:00	Scoring by quarter: 11–13, 24–26, 40–39, 53–51			Surrey Sports Park
30 April 2016; 18:00	Rachel Dunn 35/36 (97%); Pamela Cookey 18/21 (86%)		Samantha Wallace 41/46 (89%); Ella Clark 10/13 (77%)	Surrey Sports Park

=== 3rd/4th place play off ===
7 May 2016; 14:30	Team Bath	49–48	Hertfordshire Mavericks	Copper Box Arena
7 May 2016; 14:30	Scoring by quarter: 11–12, 26–24, 39–38, 49–48			Copper Box Arena

== Grand Final ==
7 May 2016; 17:00	Surrey Storm	55–53	Manchester Thunder	Copper Box Arena; Umpires: Gary Burgess and Jackie Mizon	Sky Sports
7 May 2016; 17:00	Scoring by quarter: 15–9, 32–19, 43–36, 55–53			Copper Box Arena; Umpires: Gary Burgess and Jackie Mizon	Sky Sports
7 May 2016; 17:00	Pamela Cookey 28/31 (90%); Rachel Dunn 27/32 (84%)		Helen Housby 38/39 (97%); Kathryn Turner 8/10 (80%); Eleanor Cardwell 7/10 (70%)	Copper Box Arena; Umpires: Gary Burgess and Jackie Mizon	Sky Sports

== Team of the Season ==
A panel of Sky Sports commentators and pundits including Katharine Merry, Caroline Barker, Karen Atkinson, Tamsin Greenway and Jess Thirlby selected a 2016 Team of the Season.

Position	Player	Team
GK	(England) Ama Agbeze	Loughborough Lightning
GD	(England) Layla Guscoth	Hertfordshire Mavericks
WD	(England) Amy Flanagan	Surrey Storm
C	(England) Sara Bayman	Manchester Thunder
WA	(England) Natalie Haythornthwaite	Manchester Thunder
GA	(England) Pamela Cookey	Surrey Storm
GS	(England) Rachel Dunn	Surrey Storm

== See also ==
- 2016 Surrey Storm season
- 2016 Team Bath netball season
