= 2009–10 Netball Superleague season =

Netball Superleague season

2009–10 Netball Superleague
- League: Netball Superleague
- Teams: 9
- TV partner: Sky Sports
- Champions: Team Bath
- Runners-up: Hertfordshire Mavericks
- Season MVP: Pamela Cookey (Team Bath)

Seasons
- ← 2008–09 2011 →

The 2009–10 Netball Superleague (known for sponsorship reasons as the Co-operative Netball Superleague) was the fifth season of the Netball Superleague. The league was won by Team Bath. Surrey Storm finished top of the table after the regular season but subsequently lost to both Team Bath and Hertfordshire Mavericks in the playoffs. For a fourth season out of five, Team Bath defeated Mavericks in the grand final.

== Teams ==
During the close season, Brunel Hurricanes ended their partnership with Brunel University London, relocated to the University of Surrey and became Surrey Storm. Galleria Mavericks were also renamed Hertfordshire Mavericks.

2009–10 Superleague teams	Home venue/base	Country/Region
Celtic Dragons	Welsh Institute of Sport	Wales
Glasgow Wildcats	Kelvin Hall/Bellahouston Sports Centre	Scotland
Hertfordshire Mavericks	University of Hertfordshire	East of England
Leeds Carnegie	Leeds Metropolitan University	Yorkshire
Loughborough Lightning	Loughborough University	East Midlands
Northern Thunder	Bury, Greater Manchester	North West England
Surrey Storm	Guildford Spectrum	Greater London/South East England
Team Bath	University of Bath	South West England/West of England
Team Northumbria	Gateshead	North East England

== Regular season ==
Surrey Storm finished as regular season winners.

=== Final table ===
2009–10 Netball Superleague season
Pos	Team	Pld	W	D	L	GF	GA	PP	Pts	Qualification
1	Surrey Storm	16	14	0	2	913	546	167.2	28	Qualified for major semi-final
2	Team Bath	16	13	1	2	807	585	137.9	27	Qualified for major semi-final
3	Northern Thunder	16	13	0	3	877	661	132.7	26	Qualified for minor semi-final
4	Hertfordshire Mavericks	16	11	0	5	766	583	131.4	22	Qualified for minor semi-final
5	Leeds Carnegie	16	7	1	8	711	815	87.2	15	
6	Celtic Dragons	16	3	1	12	562	812	69.2	7	
7	Glasgow Wildcats	16	3	1	12	519	794	65.4	7	
8	Loughborough Lightning	16	3	0	13	658	791	83.2	6	
9	Team Northumbria	16	3	0	13	645	911	70.8	6	

== Playoffs ==
The play-offs utilised the Page–McIntyre system to determine the two grand finalists. This saw the top two from the regular season, Surrey Storm and Team Bath, play each other, with the winner going straight through to the grand final. The loser gets a second chance to reach the grand final via the minor final. The third and fourth placed teams, Northern Thunder and Hertfordshire Mavericks also play each other, and the winner advances to the minor final. The winner of the minor final qualifies for the grand final.

Minor semi-final

30 April 2010	Northern Thunder	45–46	Hertfordshire Mavericks	Castle Leisure Centre, Bury

Major semi-final

1 May 2010	Surrey Storm	42–57	Team Bath	Surrey Sports Park

Minor final

8 May 2010	Surrey Storm	47–52	Hertfordshire Mavericks	Surrey Sports Park

== Grand Final ==
15 May 2010; 16.50	Team Bath	51–44	Hertfordshire Mavericks	Trent FM Arena; Umpires: Gary Burgess and Judith Groves	Sky Sports
15 May 2010; 16.50	Scoring by quarter: 8–13, 22–21, 36–33, 51–44			Trent FM Arena; Umpires: Gary Burgess and Judith Groves	Sky Sports
15 May 2010; 16.50	Rosie Allison 26/34 (76%); Pamela Cookey 25/35 (71%)		Louisa Brownfield 32/40 (80%); Ella Clark 10/14 (71%); Monique Wood 2/5 (40%)	Trent FM Arena; Umpires: Gary Burgess and Judith Groves	Sky Sports
