= 2011 Netball Superleague season =

Netball Superleague season

- League: Netball Superleague
- Teams: 9
- TV partner: Sky Sports
- Champions: Hertfordshire Mavericks
- Runners-up: Surrey Storm
- Season MVP: Stacey Francis (Team Bath)

Seasons
- ← 2009–10 2012 →

The 2011 Netball Superleague season (known for sponsorship reasons as the FIAT Netball Superleague) was the sixth season of the Netball Superleague. The league was won by Hertfordshire Mavericks. In the grand final Hertfordshire Mavericks defeated Surrey Storm. For the first time, the season was completed in a single calendar year, starting on 22 January and concluding on 9 June with the grand final. Fiat Group Automobiles became the Netball Superleague's new sponsor.

== Teams ==
2011 Superleague teams	Home venue/base	Country/Region
Celtic Dragons	Sport Wales National Centre	Wales
Glasgow Wildcats	Kelvin Hall/Bellahouston Sports Centre	Scotland
Hertfordshire Mavericks	University of Hertfordshire	East of England
Leeds Carnegie	Leeds Metropolitan University	Yorkshire
Loughborough Lightning	Loughborough University	East Midlands
Northern Thunder	Oldham/Bury, Greater Manchester	North West England
Team Bath	University of Bath	South West England/West of England
Team Northumbria	West Gate Centre for Sport, Newcastle	North East England
Surrey Storm	University of Surrey	Greater London/South East England

== Regular season ==
Hertfordshire Mavericks finished top of the table during the regular season after winning 14 games, losing just one game all season. Mavericks confirmed their place at the top of the table after a win and a draw during the final weekend of the regular season. On Saturday, 14 May they defeated Celtic Dragons 49–41 away and Sunday, 15 May they drew 48–48 draw with Surrey Storm at home.

=== Final table ===
2011 Netball Superleague season
Pos	Team	Pld	W	D	L	GF	GA	PP	Pts	Qualification
1	Hertfordshire Mavericks	16	14	1	1	815	600	135.8	29	Qualified for major semi-final
2	Northern Thunder	16	14	0	2	871	656	132.8	26 (Note: 2 points deducted?)	Qualified for major semi-final
3	Team Bath	16	11	0	5	829	622	133.3	22	Qualified for minor semi-final
4	Surrey Storm	16	10	1	5	874	726	120.4	21	Qualified for minor semi-final
5	Loughborough Lightning	16	8	0	8	820	779	105.3	16	
6	Celtic Dragons	16	6	0	10	755	776	97.3	12	
7	Leeds Carnegie	16	4	0	12	715	884	80.9	8	
8	Team Northumbria	16	4	0	12	578	778	74.3	8	
9	Glasgow Wildcats	16	0	0	16	503	905	55.6	0	

== Playoffs ==
The play-offs utilised the Page–McIntyre system to determine the two grand finalists. This saw the top two from the regular season, Hertfordshire Mavericks and Northern Thunder, play each other, with the winner going straight through to the grand final. The loser gets a second chance to reach the grand final via the minor final. The third and fourth placed teams, Team Bath and Surrey Storm also play each other, and the winner advances to the minor final. The winner of the minor final qualifies for the grand final.

Minor semi-final

27 May 2011	Team Bath	53–57	Surrey Storm	University of Bath	Sky Sports
27 May 2011	Scoring by quarter: 13–13, 27–25, 42–37, 53–57			University of Bath	Sky Sports
27 May 2011	Rosie Allison 31/37 (84%); Pamela Cookey 22/26 (85%)		Rachel Dunn 52/61 (85%); Tamsin Greenway 3/9 (33%); Gemma Cosentino 2/4 (50%)	University of Bath	Sky Sports

Major semi-final

28 May 2011	Hertfordshire Mavericks	55–44	Northern Thunder	Herts Sports Village

Minor final

6 June 2011	Northern Thunder	48–64	Surrey Storm	Oldham Sports Centre
6 June 2011	Scoring by half: 25–30, 48–64			Oldham Sports Centre

== Grand Final ==
9 June 2011; 19.30	Hertfordshire Mavericks	57–46	Surrey Storm	Herts Sports Village; Attendance: 1,000; Umpires: Gary Burgess and Louise Travis	Sky Sports
9 June 2011; 19.30	Scoring by quarter: 14–16, 26–27, 41–37, 57–46			Herts Sports Village; Attendance: 1,000; Umpires: Gary Burgess and Louise Travis	Sky Sports
9 June 2011; 19.30	Louisa Brownfield 37/45 (82%); Vicklyn Joseph 13/19 (68%); Monique Wood 7/8 (88%)		Rachel Dunn 41/49 (84%); Tamsin Greenway 3/4 (75%); Gemma Cosentino 2/4 (50%)	Herts Sports Village; Attendance: 1,000; Umpires: Gary Burgess and Louise Travis	Sky Sports
