= National Clubs League =

The National Clubs League was a netball league in England.

The league was established at the start of the 1992/1993 season, as the first national netball league in England. Previously, clubs had competed in local leagues, and in the annual National Clubs Tournament, a knock-out event. The league was established with two divisions of eight teams, the first division consisting of the quarter-finalists from the 1992 National Clubs Tournament, and the second division consisting of the other teams which reached the last 16 in that tournament. The division 1 teams were: Academy, Aquila, BICC, Harborne, Henley, Linden, New Cambell, and Toucans. The division 2 teams were: Hertford Hornets, Kestrels, OPA, Tongham, Vauxhall Golds, Weston Park, and Wyvern.

The 1992/93 first division was won by Linden. Following a successful season, a third division was added for 1993/94. By 2004, the league had expanded to seven divisions.

In 2001, the AENA Super Cup was established as a higher level of play, replaced in 2005 by the Netball Superleague. At the start of the 2006 season, the National Premier League was established, taking over the higher divisions of the National Clubs League.

== Champions ==
1992/1993: Linden
1993/1994: New Cambell
1994/1995:
1995/1996:
1996/1997:
1997/1998: Linden
1998/1999: Linden
1999/2000: Linden
2000/2001: Oakwood
2001/2002: YWCA Bury
2002/2003: YWCA Bury
2003/2004: Linden
2004/2005:
2005/2006: Linden
