= Glasgow Wildcats =

Scottish netball team

- Founded: 2008
- Based in: Glasgow
- Regions: Scotland
- Home venue: Kelvin Hall International Sports Arena
- League: Netball Superleague
- Website: glasgownetball.co.uk
Uniform

Glasgow Wildcats is a Scottish netball team based in Glasgow. Between 2008 and 2011 their senior team played in the Netball Superleague. They were the first team from Scotland to join the league. The Glasgow Netball Association continue to use the Glasgow Wildcats name for their under-15 and under-17 teams.

== History ==
=== New franchise ===
The Glasgow Wildcats franchise was formed in 2008 with the support of various organisations including Glasgow City Council, the University of Glasgow, Sportscotland, Culture and Sport Glasgow, Netball Scotland and the Glasgow Netball Association. One of its initial aims was to help the Scotland national netball team prepare for the 2014 Commonwealth Games, which were to be hosted in Glasgow. Denise Holland was subsequently appointed joint head coach of both the Wildcats and Scotland.

=== Netball Superleague ===
Between 2008 and 2011 Glasgow Wildcats played in the Netball Superleague. However following the conclusion of the 2011 Netball Superleague season, England Netball decided to cut the number of teams from nine to eight and Glasgow Wildcats lost their place in the league.

=== Invitational tournaments ===
During 2012 Glasgow Wildcats hosted two invitational tournaments as part of Scotland's further preparations for the 2014 Commonwealth Games. In January 2012 Wildcats won the British Invitational Netball Tournament after defeating all three opponents – England's Northern Premier Force, an England Under-21 selection and Northern Ireland who played as the Northern Panthers. In December 2012 they hosted the World Invitational Premier Club Challenge which featured West Coast Fever, Haier Pulse, Northern Thunder, Surrey Storm and Northern Ireland who again played as the Northern Panthers.

== Home venue ==
When they played in the Netball Superleague, Glasgow Wildcats main home venue was Kelvin Hall International Sports Arena. They have also played at Bellahouston Sports Centre and the Emirates Arena.

== Notable former players ==
=== Internationals ===
Scotland

- Claire Brownie
- Lynsey Gallagher
- Hayley Mulheron

== Head coaches ==
Coach	Years
(Hong Kong) Denise Holland	2008–2012
