= Rob Thirlby =

England international rugby union player

- Born: Robert Graham Thirlby; 2 March 1979 (age 47) Redruth, Cornwall; England
- Height: 6 ft 1 in (1.85 m)
- Weight: 91.6 kg (14 st 6 lb)
- School: Richard Lander School
- Notable relative: Chris Garland (father-in-law)

Rugby union career
- Position: Fullback/Wing
Senior career
Years	Team	Apps	(Points)
199x–1999	Redruth		
1998	→ Penzance & Newlyn		
1999-2000	Saracens	28	(71)
2000-2003	Bath Rugby	36	(54)
2003	Rotherham		
2003–2005	Penzance & Newlyn		
2005-2006	Gloucester Rugby	10	(5)
2007	Redruth		
National sevens team
Years	Team		Comps
- England

Rob Graham Thirlby (born 2 March 1979) is an English rugby union player who plays on the wing or full back for Yatton whilst also acting as the video analyst for Gloucester Rugby. He previously played for Moseley, Penzance-Newlyn, and for Redruth whom he joined from Gloucester Rugby. He played regularly for the England Sevens team.

== Early life ==
Thirlby was born in Penzance, Cornwall, England, and educated at Richard Lander School.

== Club career ==
Thirlby began his career with Redruth before guesting for Penzance & Newlyn in the 1998 Safari Sevens tournament in Kenya where he was spotted by Kyran Bracken who recommended him to Saracens and Thirlby joined the club ahead of the 1998–1999 season. He made his Sarries debut in an Anglo-Welsh clash with Cardiff on 16 January 1999, kicking 11 points in a 36–22 victory. He made his Premiership debut against Northampton Saints on 6 February 1999 and went on to make 28 appearances for the club in the competition, scoring six tries.

Thirlby left Saracens to join Bath Rugby in May 2000. He played 36 times for Bath in the Premiership scoring eight tries, the highlight being the hat-trick of tries he scored against Rotherham on 14 April 2001, before joining Rotherham in February 2003. He helped the club secure promotion from National Division One back into the Premiership before returning to Cornwall and Penzance & Newlyn for the 2003–2004 season.

After two seasons with Penzance & Newlyn, Thirlby returned to the Premiership by signing a two-year contract with Gloucester Rugby. After just ten Premiership appearances and a solitary try, Thirlby joined Redruth on loan in January 2007, agreeing a two-year contract with the club in March 2007.

== International ==
Thirlby was a regular member of the England Sevens team. He represented the team in both the RWC Sevens 2001 and RWC Sevens 2005, the only England player to do so, and was a member of Joe Lydon's twelve-man squad for the 2002 Commonwealth Games in Manchester. Although the team returned without medals, they did win the Sevens Plate in the tournament. He made 35 appearances in the IRB Sevens World Series, at the time the third-highest total by an England player, which has since been surpassed several times.

Thirlby received a call up for England's 2000 tour of South Africa, and although he did not appear in the test side, he played in the three tour matches, scoring a try in the 36–27 victory over Gauteng Falcons.

== Personal life ==
Thirlby is married to Jess Garland, a former England netball international. In 2019 she was appointed head coach of the England national netball team. Like her future husband, Garland also represented England at the 2002 Commonwealth Games. They have two children. Thirlby also has a child from a previous relationship. His father-in-law was Chris Garland, a professional footballer.
