= Turriff Academy =

School in Turriff, Aberdeenshire, Scotland

Coordinates: 57.5365°N 2.4611°W

- Turriff Academy in 2016
- Turriff, Aberdeenshire, AB53 4EE; Scotland

Information
- Type: Co-Educational Secondary School
- Head Teacher: Emma-Jane Whitehead
- Age: 12 to 18
- Pupils: Approx 661
- Website: www.turriff.aberdeenshire.sch.uk

Turriff Academy is a non denominational comprehensive co-educational secondary school located in Turriff, Aberdeenshire, Scotland. It serves a large catchment area lying between Inverurie in the south, Huntly to the west, Banff to the north and Fraserburgh and Ellon to the northeast or south-east.

Colin Clark, former MP for Gordon, is an ex pupil of the school.
