= Richard Lander School =

Location
- Higher Besore Road; Truro, Cornwall, TR3 6LT; England; 50°15′35″N 5°06′10″W

Information
- Type: Community school
- Motto: "Be the best you can be"
- Local authority: Cornwall Council
- Department for Education URN: 112055 Tables
- Ofsted: Reports
- Chair of Governors: Rob Loosemore
- Head teacher: Steven Mulcahy
- Staff: 150
- Gender: Coeducational
- Age: 11 to 16
- Enrolment: 1,400
- Colour: Burgundy
- Communities served: Godrevy, Pentire, Rame and Towan
- Website: http://www.richardlander.co.uk/

Richard Lander School is a coeducational English-language secondary school located in Truro, Cornwall, England. It is named after Richard Lemon Lander.

It is a community school administered by Cornwall Council.

== Notable former pupils ==
- Darren Dawidiuk, rugby player with Cornish Pirates and currently Gloucester Rugby
- Rob Thirlby, rugby player with Saracens, Bath Rugby, Gloucester Rugby
- Alex Parks, singer
