= Netball in Scotland =

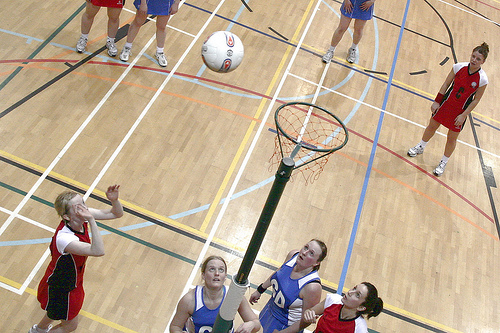
- Inter-county netball game: Orkney (red) vs Shetland 'A' (blue).
- Country: Scotland
- Governing body: Netball Scotland
- National team: Scotland

International competitions
- 1987 World Netball Tournament; 2014 Commonwealth Games

Netball in Scotland is a popular sport played mainly by women.

== National team ==
The Scotland national netball team competes in international netball tournaments such as the Netball World Cup, the Commonwealth Games, the European Netball Championship and the Netball Singapore Nations Cup. As of 21 July 2019, Scotland are 8th in the INF World Rankings.

== Netball Superleague ==
Two Scottish teams have also competed in the Netball Superleague.

Team	Years
Glasgow Wildcats	2008–2011
Strathclyde Sirens	2017–2024

== Venues ==
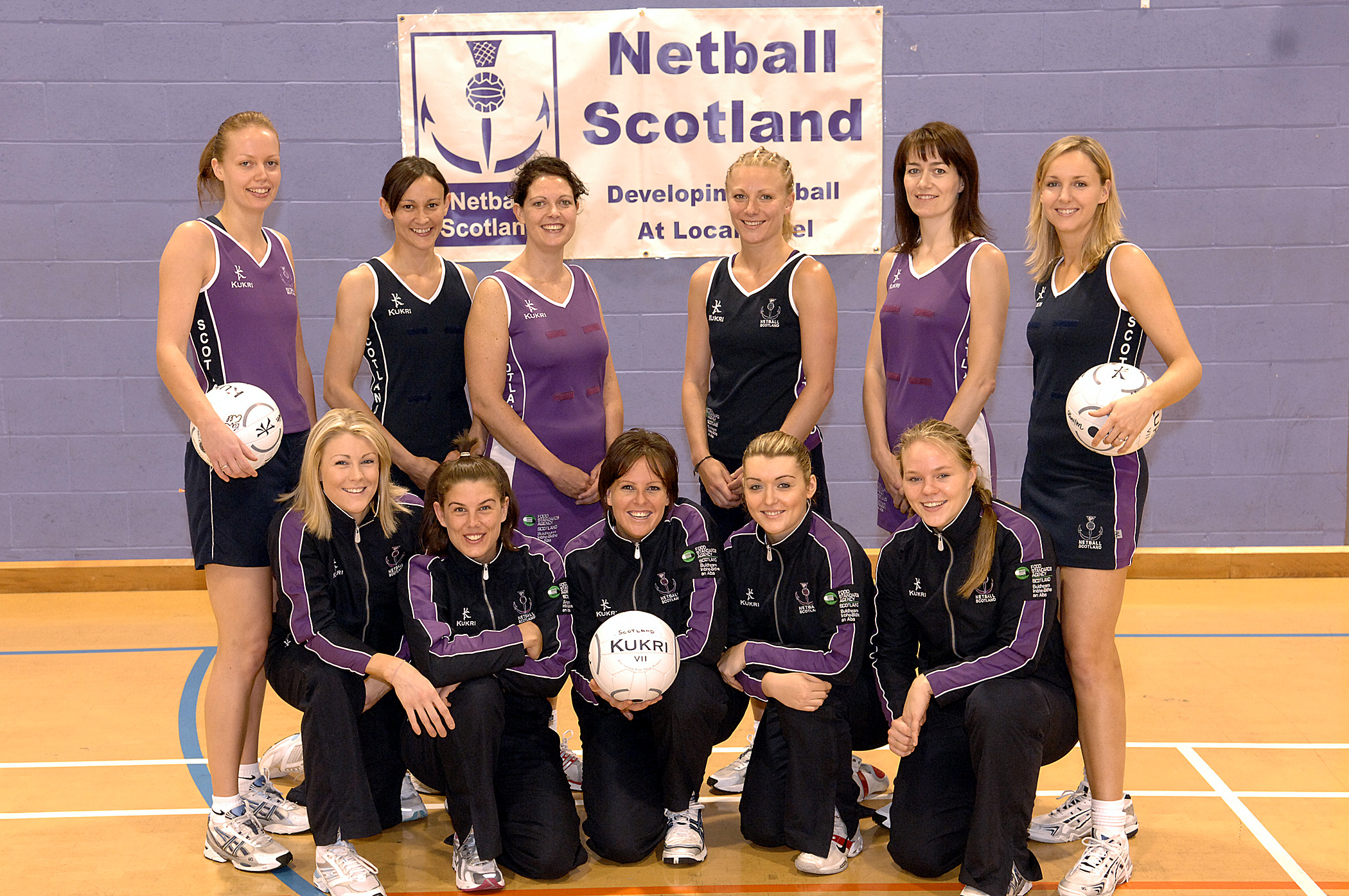
2006 Scotland national netball team

- Commonwealth Arena
- Kelvin Hall International Sports Arena
- SEC Centre
- SSE Hydro

== International tournaments ==
Scotland hosted the following international tournaments.

Tournaments
1987 World Netball Tournament
Netball at the 2014 Commonwealth Games
