= Anna Stembridge =

Netball player and coach

Personal information
- Full name: Anna Stembridge (née: Mayes)
- Born: 8 February 1981 (age 45) Swindon, England
- Occupation: Senior university lecturer
- School: New College, Swindon
- University: University of Wales Institute, Cardiff

Netball career
- Playing positions: WA, C
Years	Club team	Apps
199x–200x	Team Bath	
2005–2008	Celtic Dragons	
Years	National team	Caps
1990s	England U16, U17	5
2002–2007	Wales	45
Coaching career
- Years: Team
- 2005–2007: Welsh Netball Academy
- 2007–2008: Celtic Dragons
- 2011–2015: England
- 2015–2022: Team Bath
- 2026–: England

Anna Stembridge (née Mayes; born 8 February 1981), is the current coach of England national netball team. She previously served as head coach between 2011 and 2015 and led the team to its first major tournament title, winning the 2011 World Netball Series. Between 2015 and 2022, she served as head coach of Team Bath and later joined Jess Thirlby as assistant coach of the England squad. In March 2026, following Thirlby’s resignation, Stembridge was announced as the interim head coach for the 2026 Commonwealth Games and then the new head coach until the 2027 World Cup. As a player, she represented Wales at the 2002 and 2006 Commonwealth Games and at the 2003 and 2007 World Netball Championships. During the Super Cup era, Mayes played for Team Bath and during the early Netball Superleague era she played for Celtic Dragons.

== Education and employment ==
Mayes attended the University of Wales Institute, Cardiff, now known as Cardiff Metropolitan University. In 2002 she graduated with a Bachelor of Science in Sport and Exercise Science, in 2004 she completed a masters in Sports Psychology and in 2009 she gained a Postgraduate Certificate in Higher Education. Throughout her coaching career with England and Team Bath, Mayes worked as a lecturer in Sports Coaching and Sport Psychology at Cardiff Metropolitan University, while also working on her PhD.

== Playing career ==
=== Early years ===
Mayes began her netball career playing for the Swindon-based Lawn Netball Club before representing Hucclecote.

=== Team Bath ===
During the Super Cup era, Mayes played for Team Bath. She was coached by Lyn Gunson and her teammates included her future coaching partner, Jess Thirlby. In 2004, she was a member of the Team Bath squad that won the Super Cup title.

=== Celtic Dragons ===
Between 2005 and 2008, Mayes was a player coach with Celtic Dragons in the Netball Superleague. During the 2007–08 season she served as head coach.

=== International ===
==== England ====
Mayes represented England at both under-16 and under-17 levels, winning 5 caps.

==== Wales ====
On 12 March 2002, Mayes made her senior debut for Wales against Barbados. She eventually made 45 senior appearances for Wales. She represented Wales at the 2002 and 2006 Commonwealth Games, at the 2003 and 2007 World Netball Championships and at several European Netball Championships.

Tournaments	Place
2002 Commonwealth Games	6th
2003 World Netball Championships	14th
2006 Commonwealth Games	8th
2007 World Netball Championships	12th

== Coaching career ==
=== England ===
Between 2008 and 2011, Mayes served as an assistant coach with England. She served as an assistant at the 2008 Taini Jamison Trophy Series, the 2010 Commonwealth Games and the 2011 World Netball Championships. Between 2008 and 2009 she also served as a coach with the England U21's. She first acted as head coach of a senior England team at the 2010 World Netball Series, guiding them to second place. At the 2011 World Netball Series, while interim head coach, she guided England to the gold medal. It was the first time England won a major tournament. In the final they defeated New Zealand 33–26. In December 2011 she was confirmed as head coach on a permanent basis.

Between 2011 and 2015, Mayes served as head coach of the England team, taking charge for 46 test matches. She guided England to 31 wins, achieving a win rate of 67% overall. In January 2013 she guided England to an historic 3–0 series win against Australia. She also guided England to two series wins against Jamaica. At the 2014 Commonwealth Games, Mayes' England lost narrowly by 1 goal to both Australia and New Zealand. During the 2014 Taini Jamison Trophy Series, England beat New Zealand in New Zealand for only the second time. In March 2015, it was announced that Mayes would be leaving her England role. She was subsequently replaced by Tracey Neville.

Between 2022 and 2026, Stembridge served as Jess Thirlby’s assistant coach of the England squad. In March 2026, following Thirlby’s resignation, Stembridge was announced as the interim head coach for the 2026 Commonwealth Games and then the new head coach until the 2027 Netball World Cup.

Tournaments	Place
2010 World Netball Series	2nd place, silver medalist(s)
2011 World Netball Series	1st place, gold medalist(s)
2012 Netball Quad Series	3rd
2012 Fast5 Netball World Series	2nd place, silver medalist(s)
2013 Fast5 Netball World Series	6th
2014 Commonwealth Games	4th
2014 Taini Jamison Trophy Series	2nd
2014 Fast5 Netball World Series	3rd place, bronze medalist(s)

=== Team Bath ===
Between 2008 and 2010, Mayes served as an assistant coach with Team Bath. She formed a successful partnership with head coach Jess Thirlby and together they guided Team Bath to two Netball Superleague titles. In 2015, after leaving the England head coach role, Mayes, now known as Anna Stembridge, returned to Team Bath to serve as head coach. She was initially reunited with Thirlby, who was now Director of Netball. Under Stembridge, Team Bath qualified for the play-offs every season she was head coach and in 2021 they were runners up. They also won the 2021 British Fast5 Netball All-Stars Championship. In April 2022, Stembridge announced she would step down as head coach at the end of the season. In April 2024, Stembridge and Thirlby, were inducted into the University of Bath/Team Bath Hall of Fame for Sport.

== Honours ==
=== Player ===
Team Bath

- Super Cup
  - Winners: 2004

=== Head coach ===
England

- Fast5 Netball World Series
  - Winners: 2011
  - Runners up: 2010, 2012
- Taini Jamison Trophy
  - Runners Up: 2014

Team Bath

- British Fast5 Netball All-Stars Championship
  - Winners: 2021
- Netball Superleague
  - Runners Up: 2021
