= England Netball Premier League =

National amateur netball league in England

- Classification: Amateur
- Sport: Netball
- Founded: 2006
- First season: 2006/2007
- Organising body: England Netball
- Divisions: 3
- No. of teams: 30
- Country: England
- Most titles: Oldham Netball Club
- Qualification: Premier League Play Offs
- Streaming partner: englandnetball.tv
- Relegation to: Regional League
- Website: https://www.englandnetball.co.uk/competitions/premier-leagues/

The England Netball Premier League is a netball league in England and the highest level of club/amateur netball in the country. The teams that make up the three divisions have come through the county, regional and national pathway to take one of the 30 places.

The league was founded at the start of the 2006/07 season, as a replacement for the National Clubs League. It is the second level of play in the sport in England, below the closed Netball Super League.

== Competition Format ==
Each league comprises 10 teams who play each other twice in a home and away fixture. 5 points are award for a win, 3 for a draw, 2 for a loss within 5 goals, 1 for a loss if more than 50% of the winners score and 0 for any other loss. The team who finishes top of the each league table are named champions.

Each season, the top two teams in Premier League 2 and 3 are promoted to the division above, and the bottom two teams in Premier League 1 and 2 are relegated. In Premier League 3 the bottom 3 teams (8th, 9th and 10th) take part in the Premier League Play-Offs alongside the 9 regional league winners to decide who will compete in Premier League 3 the following season.

The league started with two divisions but expanded to 3 divisions for the 2010/2011 season, each with ten teams.

== League Champions ==
Division Champions
Season	Premier League 1	Premier League 2	Premier League 3
2006/07			No Competition
2007/08	Linden	Essex Open	No Competition
2008/09	Team Bath	The Downs	No Competition
2009/10	Academy	Leeds Carnegie	No Competition
2010/11	Academy	The Downs	Evesham Reds (Worcester Reds)
2011/12	Oldham	Leyton	Telstars
2012/13	Oldham	Thoroughbreds	Roman Glass (Bristol Romans)
2013/14	Oldham	Worcester Reds	Tameside
2014/15	Oldham	Viper10 Blades (Weston Park)	Ryland
2015/16	Academy	Tameside	Linden
2016/17	Oldham	Team Bath Toucans	Sussex Thunder
2017/18	Oldham	Grangetown	Essex Open
2018/19	Oldham	Hucclecote	Sussex Thunder
2019/20	Oldham	YWCA Bury	Charnwood
2020/21	Oldham		
2021/22	Oldham	Charnwood	Sussex Thunder
2022/23	Oldham	Grangetown	Eagles
2023/24	Academy	Hucclecote	Team Bath Toucans
2024/25	Oldham	The Downs	Blackpool
2025/26	Western Park Blades	Trafford	Ryland

== 2025/26 Premier League Teams ==
Premier League 1	Premier League 2	Premier League 3
Eagles (S)	Academy (LSE)	Exeter (SW)
Grangetown (NE)	Blackpool (NW)	Hatfield (E)
Hucclecote (SW)	Bristol Romans (SW)	Leeds Athletic (Y)
New Cambell (LSE)	Charnwood (EM)	Norfolk United (E)
Oldham (NW)	Cumberland (LSE)	Northants Storm (EM)
Team Bath Toucans (WM)	Linden (WM)	Ryland (WM)
The Downs (SW)	Oaksway (NE)	Sussex Thunder (S)
Turnford (E)	Tameside (NW)	Team Jets (SW)
Weston Park Blades (S)	Telstars (LSE)	Worcester Reds (WM)
YWCA Bury (NW)	Trafford (NW)	YMCA Magic (Y)

England Netball Regional Leagues: North East, North West, Yorkshire, West Midlands, East Midlands, East, London and South East, South, South West

== Premier League Play Off Winners ==
Premier League Play Off Winners
Year	Location	Winners		
2007				
2008				
2009				
2010				
2011		Leamington	Telstars	Grangetown
2012		Norfolk United	Ryland	Roman Glass
2013	Loughborough	Clan	Tameside	TFC
2014		Norfolk United	Team Jets	Sussex Thunder
2015		Chester	Riverside	Sussex Thunder
2016	EIS Sheffield	Grangetown	Billericay	Charnwood Sapphires
2017	University of Nottingham	Essex Open	TFC	Hertford Hornets
2018	Redbridge Leisure Centre			
2019		Exeter	Eclipse	Thoroughbreds
2020	Cancelled due to Covid19			
2021				
2022	University of Warwick	Trafford	Eagles	Northants Storm
2023	Worcester Arena	Blackpool	Leyton	Trafford
2024	EIS Sheffield	Leyton	Hatfield	Premier Romans
2025	Worcester Arena	Hatfield	Team Jets	YMCA Magic
2026	Worcester Arena	Deeside	Royals	AP Saints
