= Shaunagh Craig =

Northern Ireland netball player

Personal information
- Full name: Shaunagh Craig
- Born: 5 April 1993 (age 33) Bedford, England
- Height: 6 ft 2 in (1.88 m)
- School: Sharnbrook Upper School
- University: University of Bath

Netball career
- Playing positions: GA, GS
Years	Club team	Apps
2010–2012	Hertfordshire Mavericks	
2012–2016	Team Bath	
2019–	Belfast Ladies	
Years	National team	Caps
2013	England	
2019–	Northern Ireland	

Shaunagh Craig (born 5 April 1993) is a netball player who has represented both Northern Ireland and England at international level. She played for Northern Ireland at the 2019 Netball World Cup. She also helped Hertfordshire Mavericks and Team Bath win Netball Superleague titles in 2011 and 2013 respectively.

== Early life, family and education ==
Craig was born Bedford, England. Both of her parents were originally from Northern Ireland. She completed her secondary level education at Sharnbrook Upper School. Between 2012 and 2016 Craig attended the University of Bath on a sports scholarship and graduated with a BSc in Sports Performance.

== Playing career ==
=== Clubs ===
==== Hertfordshire Mavericks ====
Between 2010 and 2012 Craig played for Hertfordshire Mavericks. She was a member of the Mavericks squad that won the 2011 Netball Superleague title.

==== Team Bath ====
Between 2012 and 2016, while attending the University of Bath, Craig played for Team Bath. She was a member of the Team Bath squad that won the 2013 Netball Superleague title. At the end of the 2015 season, Craig was named the Supporters' Player of the Year after gaining 32% of the vote in an online poll.

==== Belfast Ladies ====
When the Northern Ireland squad was announced for the 2019 Netball World Cup, Craig was listed as a Belfast Ladies player.

=== International ===
==== England ====
Craig represented England at under-17, under-19, under-21 and A levels. At the 2013 Netball Europe Open Championships, Craig was a member an under-21 squad that represented England in the senior tournament. She was selected for the 2015 Netball World Cup England squad but subsequently had to withdraw because of an injury.

==== Northern Ireland ====
Craig was selected to represent Northern Ireland at the 2019 Netball World Cup. In the opening game against Australia, Craig scored 18 of Northern Ireland's 24 goals.

Tournaments	Place	Team
2013 Netball Europe Open Championships	2nd place, silver medalist(s)	England
2019 Netball World Cup	10th	Northern Ireland
2019 Netball Europe Open Championships	3rd place, bronze medalist(s)	Northern Ireland

== Employment ==
Between 2014 and 2015, while also attending the University of Bath, Craig worked as a development coach for England Netball. Between 2017 and 2018 she worked as a sports manager at Takapuna Grammar School. Between 2018 and 2019 she worked as a volunteer community organiser at the Corrymeela Community. In 2019 Craig began working as a service manager in Gloucester for BeeZee Bodies, a company promoting healthy lifestyles.

== Honours ==
Team Bath

- Netball Superleague
  - Winners: 2013: 1

Hertfordshire Mavericks

- Netball Superleague
  - Winners: 2011: 1

England

- Netball Europe Open Championships
  - Runners Up: 2013 : 1
