= 2008–09 Netball Superleague season =

Netball Superleague season

- League: Netball Superleague
- Teams: 9
- TV partner: Sky Sports
- Champions: Team Bath
- Runners-up: Galleria Mavericks
- Season MVP: Pamela Cookey (Team Bath)

Seasons
- ← 2007–08 2009–10 →

The 2008–09 Netball Superleague season (known for sponsorship reasons as the Co-operative Netball Superleague) was the fourth season of the Netball Superleague. The league was won by Team Bath. For a third season out of four, Team Bath defeated Galleria Mavericks in the grand final. The Superleague expanded to nine teams, with the addition of Glasgow Wildcats, the first team from Scotland. Team Bath finished the regular season with a 100% record.

== Teams ==
The Superleague expanded to nine teams, with the addition of Glasgow Wildcats.

| 2008–09 Superleague teams | Home venue/base | Country/Region |
|---|---|---|
| Brunel Hurricanes | Guildford Spectrum | Greater London/South East England |
| Celtic Dragons | Welsh Institute of Sport | Wales |
| Galleria Mavericks | University of Hertfordshire | East of England |
| Glasgow Wildcats | Kelvin Hall/Bellahouston Sports Centre | Scotland |
| Leeds Carnegie | Leeds Metropolitan University | Yorkshire |
| Loughborough Lightning | Loughborough University | East Midlands |
| Northern Thunder | Bury, Greater Manchester | North West England |
| Team Bath | University of Bath | South West England/West of England |
| Team Northumbria | Gateshead | North East England |

== Regular season ==
Team Bath finished the regular season with a 100% record.

=== Final table ===
2008–09 Netball Superleague
| Pos | Team | Pld | W | D | L | GF | GA | PP | Pts | Qualification |
|---|---|---|---|---|---|---|---|---|---|---|
| 1 | Team Bath | 16 | 16 | 0 | 0 | 979 | 579 | 169.1 | 32 | Qualified for major semi-final |
| 2 | Loughborough Lightning | 16 | 14 | 0 | 2 | 875 | 615 | 142.3 | 28 | Qualified for major semi-final |
| 3 | Galleria Mavericks | 16 | 12 | 0 | 4 | 733 | 602 | 121.8 | 24 | Qualified for minor semi-final |
| 4 | Leeds Carnegie | 16 | 8 | 0 | 8 | 734 | 728 | 100.8 | 16 | Qualified for minor semi-final |
| 5 | Brunel Hurricanes | 16 | 7 | 0 | 9 | 619 | 598 | 103.5 | 14 | |
| 6 | Team Northumbria | 16 | 6 | 0 | 10 | 695 | 747 | 93.0 | 12 | |
| 7 | Northern Thunder | 16 | 6 | 0 | 10 | 667 | 797 | 83.7 | 12 | |
| 8 | Glasgow Wildcats | 16 | 2 | 0 | 14 | 536 | 857 | 62.5 | 4 | |
| 9 | Celtic Dragons | 16 | 1 | 0 | 15 | 466 | 780 | 59.7 | 2 | |

== Playoffs ==
The play-offs utilised the Page–McIntyre system to determine the two grand finalists. This saw the top two from the regular season, Team Bath and Loughborough Lightning, play each other, with the winner going straight through to the grand final. The loser gets a second chance to reach the grand final via the minor final. The third and fourth placed teams, Galleria Mavericks and Leeds Carnegie also play each other, and the winner advances to the minor final. The winner of the minor final qualifies for the grand final.

Minor semi-final

| 21 March 2009 | Galleria Mavericks | 59–46 | Leeds Carnegie | University of Hertfordshire |

Major semi-final

| 23 March 2009 | Team Bath | 62–55 | Loughborough Lightning | University of Bath |

Minor final

| 28 March 2009 | Loughborough Lightning | 48–49 | Galleria Mavericks | ET | Loughborough University |
| 28 March 2009 | Scoring by quarter: 12–12, 18–22, 29–27, 40–40, ET: 48–49 | | | ET | Loughborough University |

== Grand Final ==
| 4 April 2009; 19:30 | Team Bath | 54–46 | Galleria Mavericks | Coventry Skydome; Umpires: Gary Burgess and Judith Groves | Sky Sports |
| 4 April 2009; 19:30 | Scoring by quarter: 19–8, 29–20, 42–31, 54–46 | | | Coventry Skydome; Umpires: Gary Burgess and Judith Groves | Sky Sports |
| 4 April 2009; 19:30 | Rachel Dunn 28/34 (82%); Pamela Cookey 26/28 (93%) | | Louisa Brownfield 31/34 (91%); Ella Clark 15/18 (83%) | Coventry Skydome; Umpires: Gary Burgess and Judith Groves | Sky Sports |
