= Kathryn Ainsworth =

Australian netball player

Personal information
- Full name: Kathryn Garner (Née: Ainsworth)
- Born: c. 1985 (age 40–41)
- School: Southern Cross K-12

Netball career
- Playing positions: WD, WA, C
Years	Club team	Apps
2002	NCAS	
200x	NSWIS	
2006	QAS	
2007–2009	Suncoast Lynx	
2012–2016	Surrey Storm	

Kathryn Ainsworth, also known as Katt Ainsworth, is an Australian netball player who played for Surrey Storm in the Netball Superleague. She was a member of the Storm teams that won Superleague titles in 2015 and 2016.

== Playing career ==
=== Australia ===
Ainsworth is originally from East Ballina/Ballina, New South Wales and attended Southern Cross K-12. She initially played junior netball with the local association. She subsequently played with both the Lismore–based North Coast Academy of Sport and the New South Wales Institute of Sport. She also represented New South Wales at under-17 level. She later played for the Queensland Academy of Sport, for Suncoast Lynx of the Queensland State League and represented Queenlands at under-17 and under-21 levels, captaining the latter team.

=== Surrey Storm ===
Between 2012 and 2016, Ainsworth played for Surrey Storm in the Netball Superleague. She arrived in London in 2010 on a Contiki holiday and decided to stay. After she began playing social netball, she was encouraged to try out for Surrey Storm. She was a member of the Storm teams that won Superleague titles in 2015 and 2016.

== Honours ==
Surrey Storm

- Netball Superleague
  - Winners: 2015, 2016: 2
  - Runners up: 2012, 2014: 2
