= Jess Thirlby =

Former English netball player and coach

Personal information
- Full name: Jessica Thirlby (née: Garland)
- Born: 15 November 1979 (age 46) Bristol, England
- Height: 5 ft 9.25 in (1.76 m)
- Spouse: Rob Thirlby
- Relative: Chris Garland (father)

Netball career
- Playing positions: WA, GA
Years	Club team	Apps
1999–2006	Team Bath	
Years	National team	Caps
2000–2006	England	
Coaching career
- Years: Team
- 2006–2007: Celtic Dragons
- 2008–2019: Team Bath
- 2019–2026: England

Jessica Thirlby (née Garland; born 15 November 1979) is a former England netball international and former head coach of the England national netball team. As a player, she was a member of the Team Bath squad that won the inaugural 2005–06 Netball Superleague title. She also represented England at the 2002 Commonwealth Games. As a head coach, she guided Team Bath to further Netball Superleague titles in 2008–09, 2009–10 and 2013. In July 2019, Thirlby was appointed head coach of the senior England national netball team. Under Thirlby's guidance, England have finished as runners up at the 2023 Netball World Cup and won the 2021 and 2024 Taini Jamison Trophy Series' and the 2025 Netball Nations Cup.

== Early life and family ==
Jess Thirlby is the daughter of Chris Garland, who was a former professional football player, and his wife, Patricia Cooper. She has two brothers, Adam and Ryan. She is married to Rob Thirlby, who is a former England rugby sevens international. Her husband also represented England at the 2002 Commonwealth Games. She is a mother of two children and stepmother to a third.

== Playing career ==
=== Team Bath ===
Between 1999 and 2006, Thirlby played for Team Bath. She was one of Team Bath's first full-time players. Between 2001 and 2005, she played in all five Team Bath Super Cup campaigns, making 31 appearances. In 2004 she was a member of the Team Bath squad that won the Super Cup. She was also a member of the Team Bath squad that won the inaugural 2005–06 Netball Superleague title. Her team mates at Team Bath included Pamela Cookey, Rachel Dunn, Stacey Francis, Tamsin Greenway and Geva Mentor.

=== England ===
Thirlby represented England at every level from under-16 to senior. Between 2000 and 2006 she was a regular member of the senior squad. She also represented England at the 2002 Commonwealth Games.

== Coaching career ==
=== Celtic Dragons ===
During the 2006–07 Netball Superleague season, Thirlby served as head coach of Celtic Dragons.

=== Team Bath ===
During the 2007–08 Netball Superleague season, Thirlby served as an assistant coach to Jan Crabtree at Team Bath. She was appointed Team Bath's head coach for the 2008–09 Netball Superleague season. She subsequently guided Team Bath to further Netball Superleague titles in 2008–09, 2009–10 and 2013. Between 2015 and 2019, Thirlby served as Team Bath's director of netball.

=== England ===
While still an active player, Thirlby coached the England under-17 and under-19 teams during 2004 and 2005. She later served as both an assistant coach and head coach with the England under-21 team at the 2009 and 2013 World Youth Cups. Between 2013 and 2015 she served as an assistant coach to Anna Stembridge with the senior England team. In July 2019 Thirlby was appointed head coach of the senior England team, taking over from Tracey Neville. Under Thirlby's guidance, England have finished as runners up at the 2023 Netball World Cup and won the 2021 and 2024 Taini Jamison Trophy Series' and the 2025 Netball Nations Cup. In March 2026, Thirlby stepped down as England head coach with immediate effect and four months before the 2026Commonwealth Games in Glasgow. She cited needing to process the death of her father as the reason and was replaced by assistant coach and ex head coach Anna Stembridge in the interim with recruitment to take place after the Commonwealth Games.

Tournaments	Place
2019 South Africa England netball series	1st
2020 Netball Nations Cup	3rd
2021 Netball Legends Series	1st
2021 Taini Jamison Trophy Series	1st
2021 England Jamaica netball series	1st
2022 Netball Quad Series	2nd
2022 Commonwealth Games	3rd
2022 England Uganda netball series	1st
2022 Australia England netball series	2nd
2023 England Jamaica netball series	1st
2023 Netball Quad Series	3rd
2023 Netball World Cup	2nd place, silver medalist(s)
2024 Netball Nations Cup	2nd
2024 Australia England netball series	2nd
2024 Taini Jamison Trophy Series	1st
2025 Netball Nations Cup	1st
2025 England New Zealand netball series	2nd

== Honours ==
=== Player ===
Team Bath

- Netball Superleague
  - Winners: 2005–06: 1
- Super Cup
  - Winners: 2004: 1

=== Head coach ===
England

- Netball World Cup
  - Runners up: 2023
- Taini Jamison Trophy
  - Winners: 2021, 2024
- Netball Nations Cup
  - Winners: 2025

Team Bath

- Netball Superleague
  - Winners: 2008–09, 2009–10, 2013: 3
