= Netball in England =

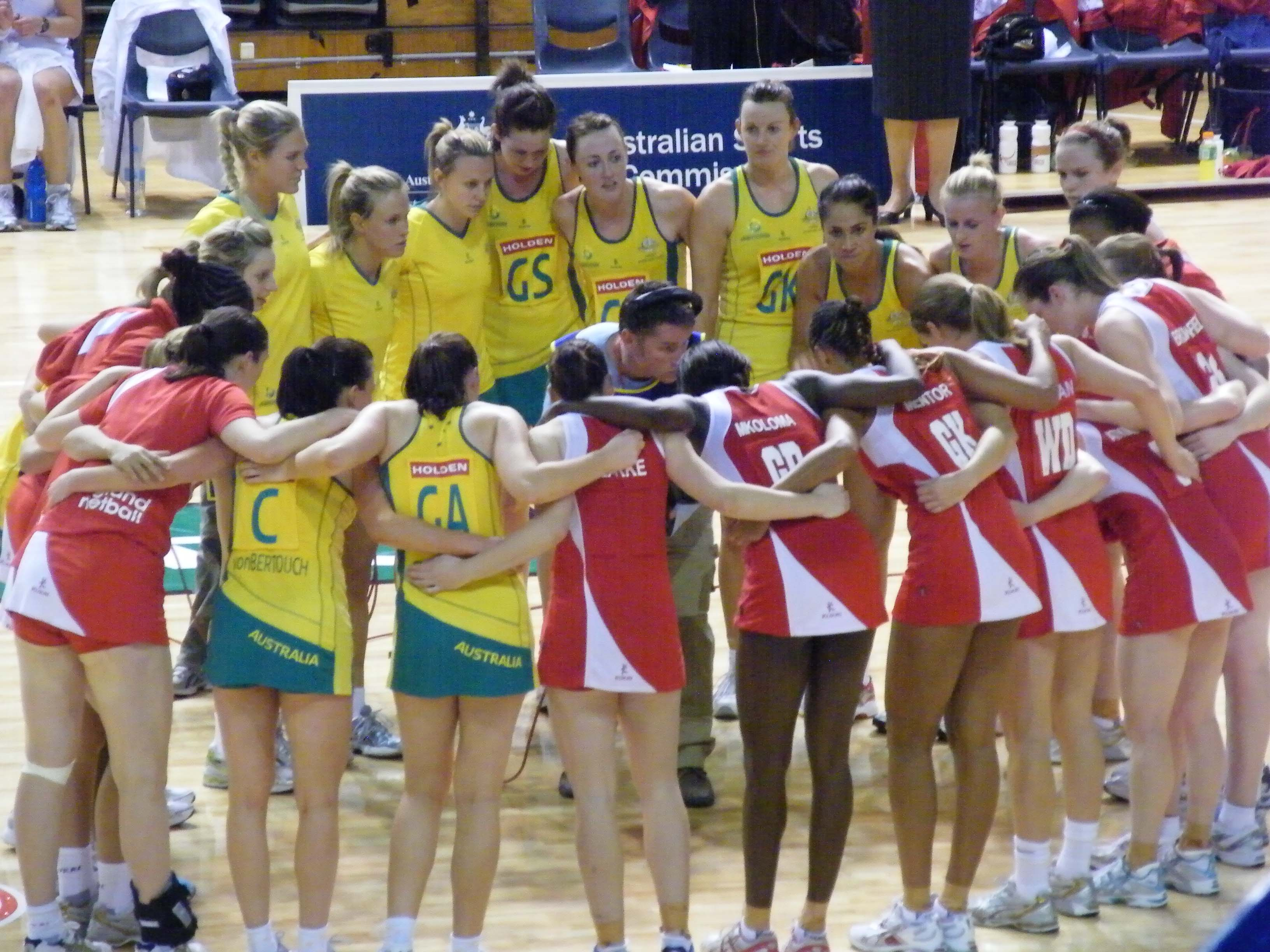
- Australia v England: International netball test – Adelaide, October 2008.
- Country: England
- Governing body: England Netball
- National team: England
- Registered players: 92,000

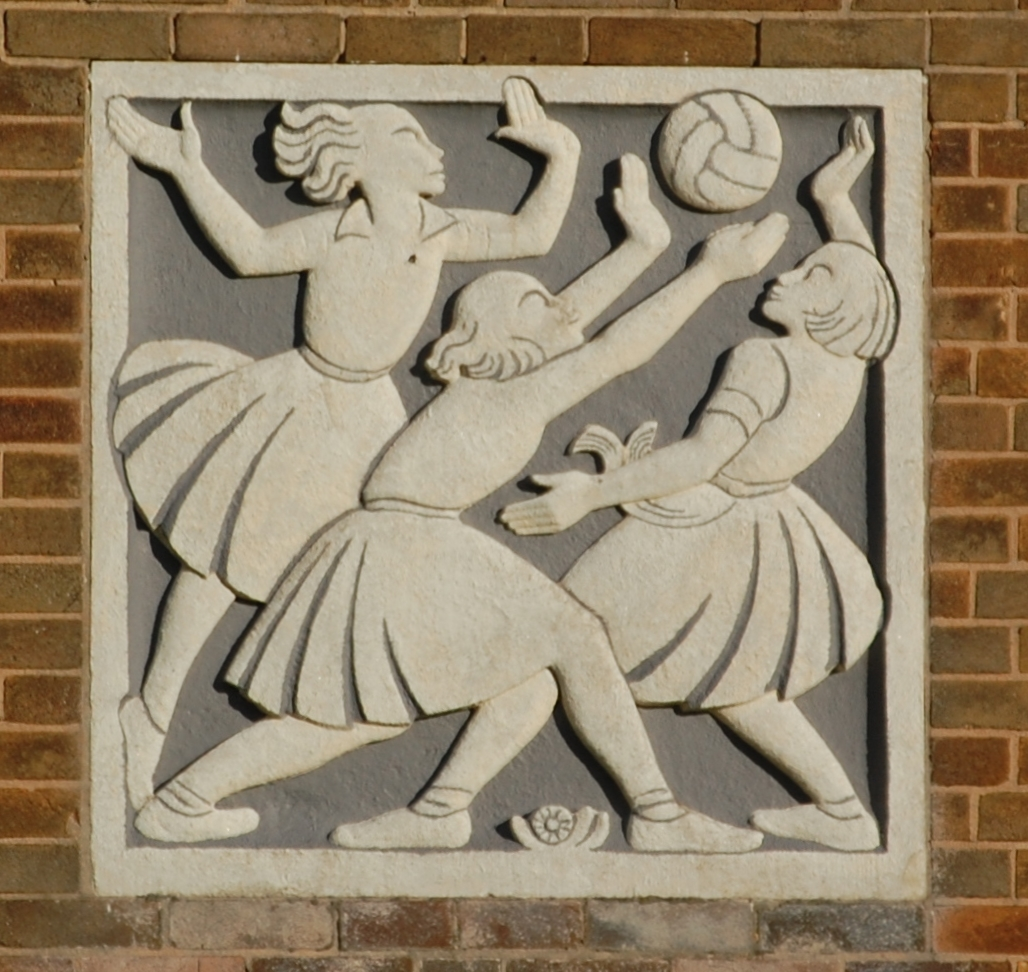
Relief carving at Great Barr School, Birmingham, England, showing girls playing netball.

In England, netball has been popular enough to be included as part of the physical education curriculum. Its inclusion had been at times controversial; during the 1910s and 1920s, schools worried about the potential negative impact of physical exercise like netball participation on the health of girls.

Below is a list including some of the top performances for the English national netball team:

- 1998 Commonwealth Games: 3rd place
- 2002 Commonwealth Games: 4th place
- 2005 World Youth Netball Championship: 2nd place
- 2018 Commonwealth Games: 1st place

As of August 2016, the women's national team was ranked number three in the world.

Australia v England

== Bibliography ==
- International Federation of Netball Associations (21 January 2011a). "Current World Rankings". Archived from the original on 19 May 2011.
- International Federation of Netball Associations (15 June 2008). "History of Netball". Archived from the original on 6 March 2011.
- Western Argus (24 October 1922). "GAMES FOR GIRLS". Western Argus (Kalgoorlie, WA : 1916–1938). Kalgoorlie, WA: National Library of Australia. p. 1.
- White, Anita (December 2002). "Women and sport in the UK". In Pfister, Gertrud; Hartmann-Tews, Ilse (eds.). Sport and Women: Social Issues in International Perspective. International Society for Comparative Physical Education & Sport. Routledge. ISBN 0-415-24628-8.
