= AENA Super Cup =

Former English netball league

- First season: 2001
- Folded: 2005
- Replaced by: Netball Superleague
- No. of teams: 6
- Country: England
- Last champions: London Tornadoes (3rd title)
- Most titles: London Tornadoes (3 titles)
- Sponsor: Fisher & Paykel

The AENA Super Cup was the top level netball league featuring teams from England between 2001 and 2005. The league was organised by the All England Netball Association. Its main sponsor was Fisher & Paykel and, as a result, it was also known as the Fisher & Paykel Super Cup. It was also referred to as the Super League. London Tornadoes were the Super Cup's most successful team, winning three of the five seasons contested. Northern Thunder and Team Bath Force both won a title each. In 2005–06 it was replaced by the Netball Superleague.

== Teams ==
The Super Cup featured six teams. The England national netball team's senior and development squads were shared around, and each side was initially allowed to import up to three foreigners. Following the demise of the Super Cup, four of the six teams subsequently went onto to play in the Netball Superleague.

	Home venue/base	Region	Netball Superleague name
Birmingham Blaze	University of Birmingham	West Midlands	
London Hurricanes	Brunel University London	Greater London/South East England	Brunel Hurricanes/Surrey Storm
London Tornadoes		Greater London/South East England	
Northern Thunder		North West England	Manchester Thunder
Northern Flames	Gateshead Leisure Centre	North East England	Team Northumbria
Team Bath Force	University of Bath	South West England/West of England	Team Bath

Notes

- ^1 London Tornadoes were also known as Petchey London Tornadoes.

== Finals ==
Season	Winners	Score	Runners up	Venue
2001	London Tornadoes	47–46	Birmingham Blaze	Sheffield
2002	Northern Thunder		Birmingham Blaze	
2003	London Tornadoes	46–28	London Hurricanes	University of Bath
2004	Team Bath Force	49–43	Northern Thunder	Blackpool
2005	London Tornadoes			

== Winners ==
Winners	Seasons	Titles
London Tornadoes	2001, 2003, 2005	3
Team Bath Force	2004	1
Northern Thunder	2002	1
