= Wright Robinson College =

School in Manchester, England

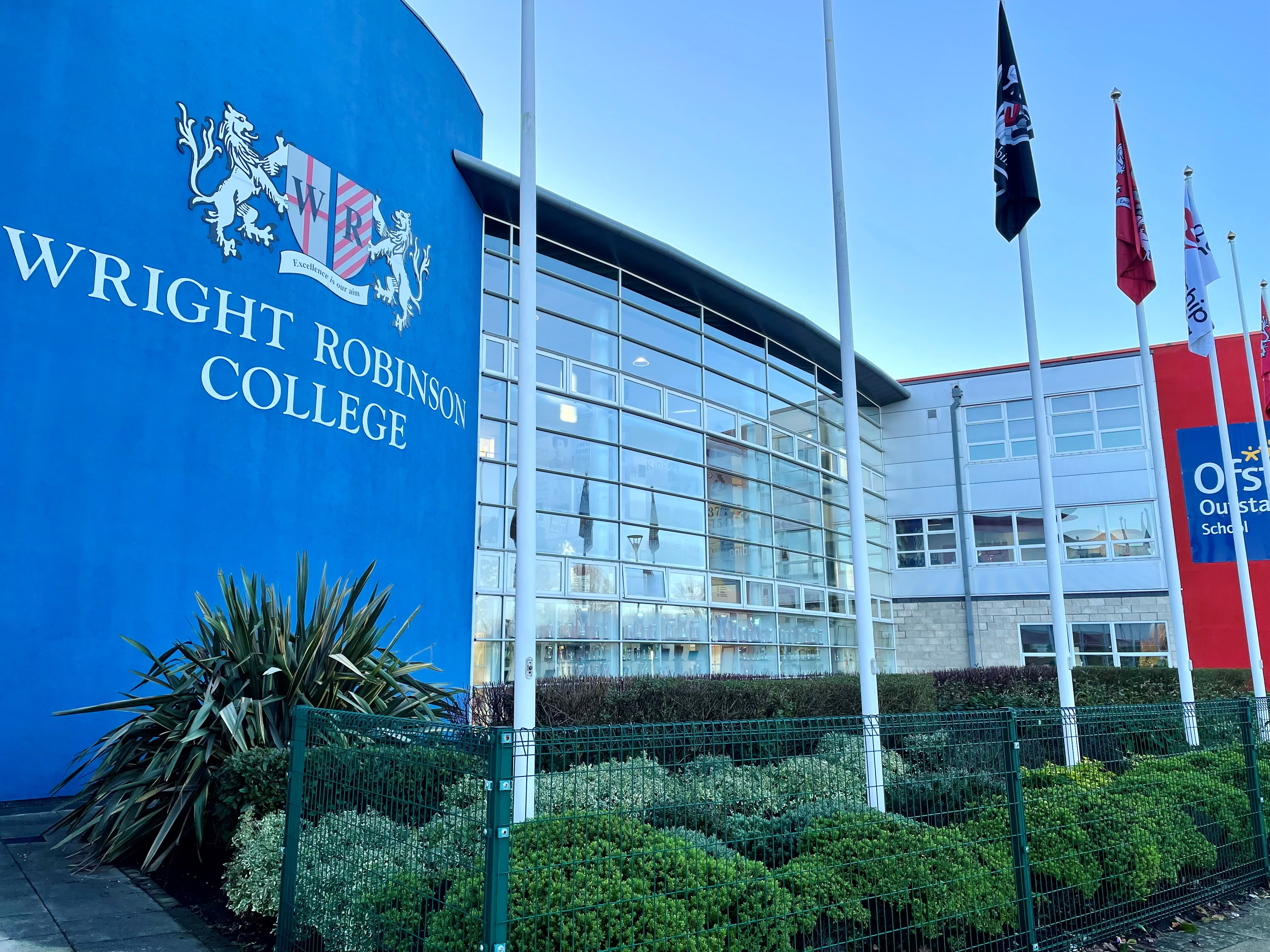
Wright Robinson College

Wright Robinson College is an 11-16 coeducational secondary school situated in Abbey Hey, Gorton, Manchester, England. The college is situated in extensive grounds alongside Gorton reservoir and surrounding greenbelt.

The college is named after Wright Robinson, a long-serving Manchester city councillor. The college was graded Outstanding in all areas by Ofsted in both 2016 and 2021.

In 2024 Wright Robinson was named as one of The Times 'Best Places to Work' among medium sized organisations.

== New building ==
In September 2007, the college moved out of the old building and into the new £23m+ building on the adjoining fields. The school was built under the Private Finance Initiative scheme and is the most expensive school ever built in England. At a total of £43m, the school and grounds include facilities like a 25-metre swimming pool, multiple sports halls, fitness suite, dance studio, weights room and numerous tennis and football pitches.

== Sport ==
The college holds the afPE Quality Mark with distinction, an award which evidences the strength and quality of Physical Education, School Sport and Physical Activity (PESSPA) at Wright Robinson.

== Official opening ==
In September 2008, the college was officially opened by the then Prime Minister of the United Kingdom, Mr Gordon Brown.

== Awards ==
- Education Business Awards Outstanding Progress 2024

== Notable former pupils ==
- Nicky Butt - Footballer
- Jon Butterworth - Professor of Particle Physics at University College London
- Teden Mengi - Footballer
- Mohammed Sangare - Footballer
- Daniel Adshead - Footballer
