= Kelvin Hall International Sports Arena =

Event location

Coordinates: 55°52′6.58″N 4°17′38.56″W

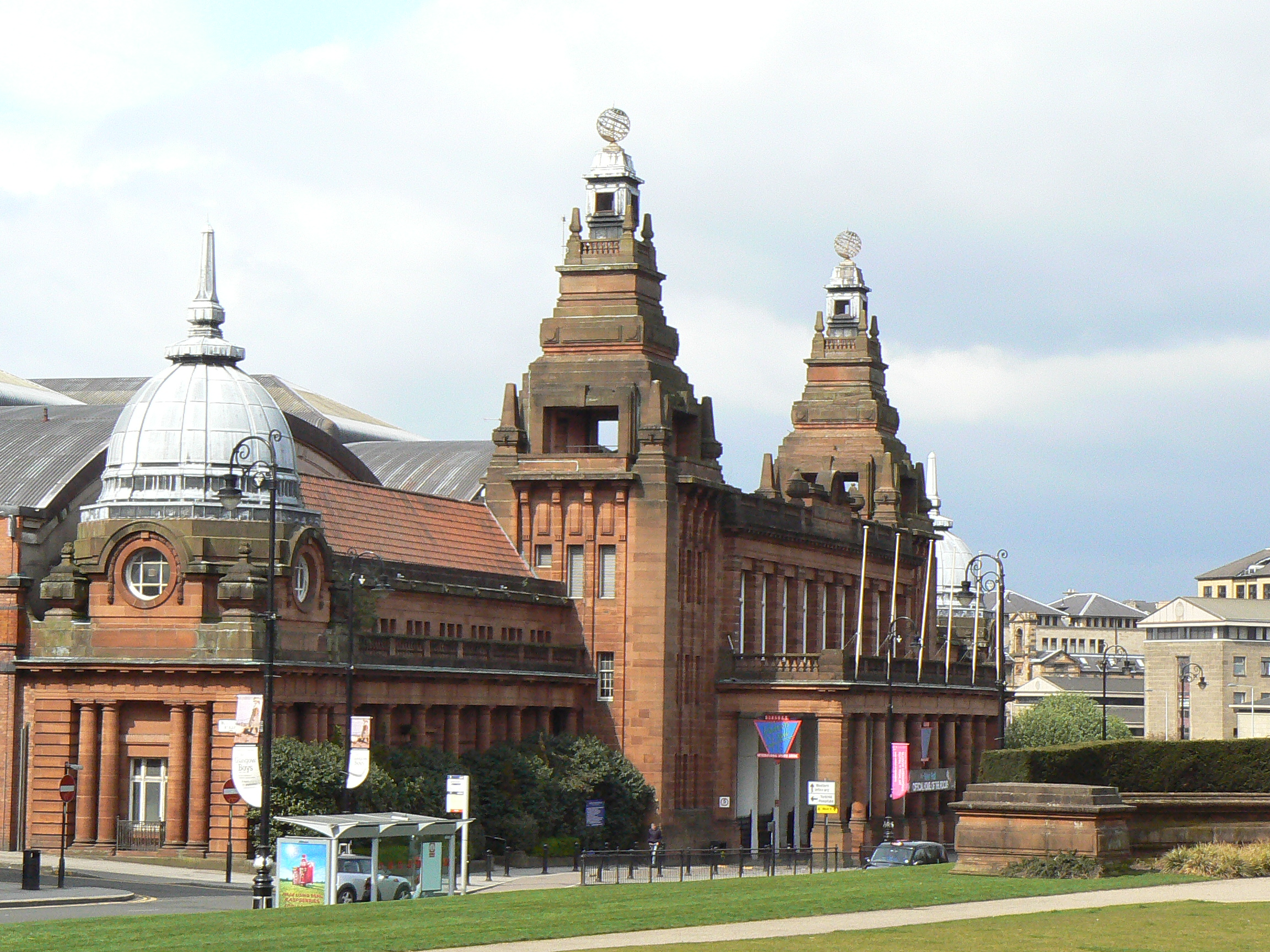
Kelvin Hall

The Kelvin Hall International Sports Arena was located within the Kelvin Hall in Glasgow, Scotland. It hosted many athletics competitions including the 1990 European Athletics Indoor Championships and the Glasgow International Match from 1988 until 2012 when it moved to the Commonwealth Arena.

== History ==
Built in the West End of Glasgow, near the Kelvingrove Art Gallery and Museum, the Kelvin Hall was completed in 1927. It was originally used to house large scale exhibitions, including the Industrial exhibitions of the Festival of Britain in 1951. Over the decades it has also hosted motor shows, modern homes exhibitions and the world-renowned Kelvin Hall Circus. Lions, tigers and African elephants all thrilled Glaswegians for years and many to this day can remember that distinctive aroma when walking round the carnival after their circus visit. In 1988 a new arena for sports opened within it as did the Museum of Transport.

== Current Kelvin Hall ==
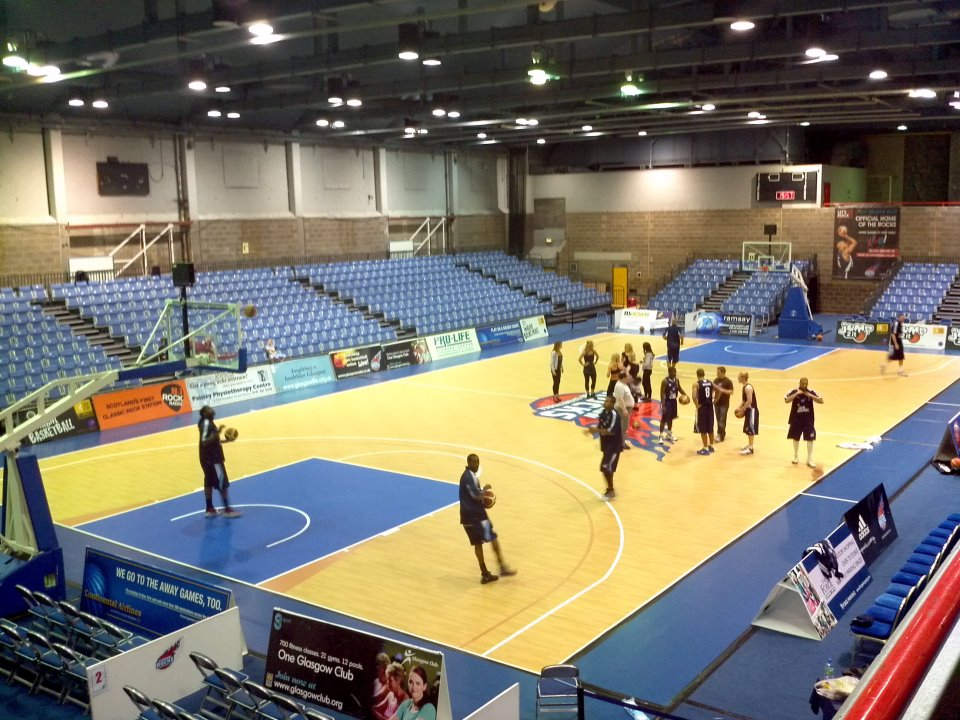
Basketball venue

However once the Scottish Exhibition and Conference Centre opened in 1985, the building needed modernisation and became home to the International Sports Arena.

The Kelvin Hall housed an indoor international sports arena, which hosted many international athletic events, as well as boxing, and badminton competitions. The venue was the home arena for Glasgow Rocks who compete in the British Basketball League. The Rocks played at 1,200 capacity Kelvin Hall from 2008 to 2012, following a move from the Braehead Arena. The team has moved to the 5,000-capacity Commonwealth Arena from the 2012–2013 season.

== Facilities ==
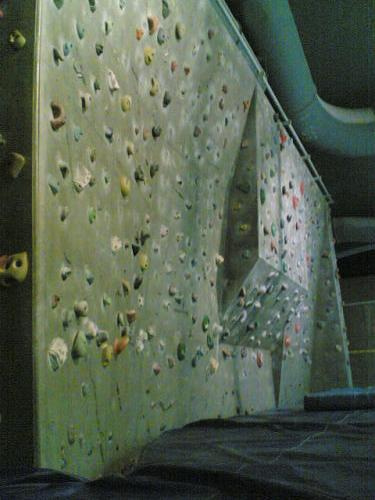
The Bouldering Wall

- Fitness Classes
- Athletics Track
- Sports Injury Clinic
- Sports Halls
- Climbing (Bouldering) Wall
- Function Suite
- Fitness Suite
- Conditioning Suite
- Conference Room

Preceded by Houtrust; The Hague	European Indoor Championships in Athletics; Venue; 1990	Succeeded by Palasport di Genoa; Genoa
