= Team Bath (netball) =

Netball Superleague team

- Nickname(s): Blue and Gold
- Based in: Bath, Somerset
- Regions: South West England/ West of England
- Home venue: Team Bath Arena; Sports Training Village; University of Bath
- Leagues: Super Cup; Netball Super League; NXT Gen; England Netball Premier League
- Website: netball.teambath.com
Uniform
Uniform

Team Bath is an English netball team based at the University of Bath. In 2005–06 they were both founder members and the inaugural champions of the Super League. They were Super League champions again in 2006–07, 2008–09, 2009–10 and 2013, and British Fast5 All-Stars Champions in 2021. In 2023, England Netball announced plans to relaunch the Netball Super League in 2025, with an aim to professionalise the league. During the tender process, the new operating standards for clubs made it unfeasible for Team Bath's senior team to participate in the league and it was disbanded after the 2024 season. The franchise was given a license to continue to deliver the southwest performance pathway on behalf of England Netball including a NXT Gen team.

The netball team is one of several sports teams based at the University of Bath that use the Team Bath brand name. Others include an association football team and a field hockey team.

== History ==
=== Early years ===
The modern Team Bath netball team was formed during the late 1990s following the merger of several clubs and teams. These include Bath Netball Club, Bath Tigers and the Toucans Netball Club. The Team Bath Toucans name is still used by Team Bath's England Netball Premier League team.

=== Super Cup ===
Between 2001 and 2005, Team Bath Force, together with five other franchises – Northern Flames, London Tornadoes, London Hurricanes, University of Birmingham Blaze and Northern Thunder – competed in the Super Cup. In 2004, with a squad that included Sara Bayman, Rachel Dunn, Jess Garland, Tamsin Greenway and Geva Mentor, Team Bath won the Super Cup. In the final they defeated Northern Thunder 49–43. In 2005, with a squad that included Sara Bayman and Pamela Cookey, Team Bath also won the BUCS netball championship for the first time.

=== Netball Super League ===
In 2005 Team Bath were named as the South West England/West of England franchise in the new Netball Super League. Together with Brunel Hurricanes, Celtic Dragons, Leeds Carnegie, Galleria Mavericks, Northern Thunder, Loughborough Lightning and Team Northumbria, Team Bath were founder members of the league. In 2005–06 with a squad that included Pamela Cookey, Rachel Dunn, Stacey Francis, Jess Garland, Tamsin Greenway and Geva Mentor, Team Bath won the inaugural Netball Super League title. Team Bath won further Netball Super League titles in 2006–07, 2008–09, 2009–10 and 2013. In 2023, England Netball announced plans to relaunch the Netball Superleague in 2025, with an aim to professionalise the league. During the tender process, the new operating standards for clubs made it unfeasible for Team Bath's senior team to participate in the league. This was due to the lack of arena provision, which formed a core part of England Netball’s requirements and despite ongoing discussions with potential partners there were no arenas in the region that met the requirements at the time. The team was disbanded after the 2024 season, however the franchise was given a license to continue to deliver the southwest performance pathway including a NXT Gen team.

== Senior finals ==
=== Super Cup ===
Season	Winners	Score	Runners up	Venue
2004	Team Bath Force	49–43	Northern Thunder	Blackpool

=== Netball Super League Grand Finals ===
Between 2006 and 2009–10, Team Bath played in four out of five Netball Super League Grand Finals. They reached their first Grand Final for eight years in 2021.

Season	Winners	Score	Runners up	Venue
2005–06	Team Bath	43–35	Galleria Mavericks	Guildford Spectrum
2006–07	Team Bath	53–45	Galleria Mavericks	Guildford Spectrum
2008–09	Team Bath	54–46	Galleria Mavericks	Coventry Skydome
2009–10	Team Bath	51–44	Hertfordshire Mavericks	Trent FM Arena
2013	Team Bath	62–56	Celtic Dragons	University of Worcester Arena
2021	Loughborough Lightning	49-32	Team Bath	Copper Box Arena

=== Fast5 Netball All-Stars Championship ===
Team Bath played in the inaugural British Fast5 Netball All-Stars Championship final in 2017 and won the competition for the first time in 2021.

Season	Winners	Score	Runners up	Venue
2017	Loughborough Lightning	35–33	Team Bath	The O2 Arena
2021	Team Bath	23-17	Saracens Mavericks	Copper Box Arena

== Home venue ==
Team Bath play their home matches in the Team Bath Arena at the Sports Training Village on the University of Bath campus.

== Notable players ==
=== 2024 squad ===
2024 Team Bath roster
Players
Coaching staff

Nat.	Name	Position(s)	DoB	Height
(England)	Tash Pavelin	GD,GK	22 April 1998	1.83 m (6 ft 0 in)
(Wales)	Bethan Dyke	C, WA	25 December 1994	1.64 m (5 ft 5 in)
(England)	Kadeen Corbin	GS, GA	27 November 1991	1.77 m (5 ft 10 in)
(England)	Lily-May Catling (c)	GD, WD, GK	17 March 1995	1.79 m (5 ft 10 in)
(England)	Kirsty Harris	WA, C	9 December 1998	1.72 m (5 ft 8 in)
(England)	Sophie Kelly	GS, GA	28 November 2003	–
(England)	Jayda Pechova	GD, GK	21 August 2004	1.82 m (6 ft 0 in)
(England)	Phoebe Maslen	C, WD	8 March 2004	1.72 m (5 ft 8 in)
(Scotland)	Emma Barrie	GS	13 April 2002	1.93 m (6 ft 4 in)
(Australia)	Sloan Burton	GA,GS		–
(New Zealand)	Lisa Putt	GD,GK, WD	2 October 2001	1.81 m (5 ft 11 in)
(England)	Ellie Ervine	C, WA		–
(England)	Lily Jones (TP)	GS, GA	28 November 2004	–

Head coach

- Asha Francis

Notes

- (c) – Captain
- (cc) – Co-captain
- (vc) – Vice-captain
- – Injury / maternity leave
- (TRP) – Temporary Replacement Player
Player profiles: Team website
Last updated: 12 September 2023

=== Internationals ===
England

- Ama Agbeze
- Imogen Allison
- Sara Bayman
- Pamela Cookey
- Kadeen Corbin
- Sasha Corbin
- Shaunagh Craig
- Sophie Drakeford-Lewis
- Rachel Dunn
- Stacey Francis
- Tamsin Greenway
- Layla Guscoth
- Serena Guthrie
- Geva Mentor
- Yasmin Parsons
- Mia Ritchie
- Rachel Shaw
- Jess Thirlby
- Eboni Usoro-Brown

Northern Ireland

- Shaunagh Craig
- Fionnuala Toner

South Africa

- Khanyisa Chawane
- Lenize Potgieter
- Karla Pretorius
- Zanele Vimbela

Jamaica

- Vangelee Williams

Scotland

- Claire Brownie

Wales

- Ursula Bowers
- Suzy Drane
- Bethan Dyke
- Chelsea Lewis
- Anna Mayes

== Coaches ==
=== Head coaches ===
Coach	Years
(New Zealand) Lyn Gunson	1999–2005
(England) Jan Crabtree	2005–2008
(England) Jess Thirlby	2008–2015
(Wales) Anna Stembridge	2015–2022
(England) Asha Francis	2022–2024

NXT Gen Coach	Years
(England) Natalie Roddy & Anya Le Monnier	2025-

=== Directors of netball ===
Coach	Years
(New Zealand) Lyn Gunson	2005–2008
(England) Jess Thirlby	2015–2019
(England) Jo Vann	2019–2021

== Honours ==
- Netball Superleague
  - Winners: 2005–06, 2006–07, 2008–09, 2009–10, 2013: 5
  - Runners-up: 2021: 1
- British Fast5 Netball All-Stars Championship
  - Winners: 2021: 1
  - Runners up: 2017: 1
- Super Cup
  - Winners: 2004: 1
- Mike Greenwood Trophy
  - Winners: 2015: 1
  - Runners up: 2016: 1
