= 1988–89 Manchester United F.C. season =

English football club season

Manchester United
1988–89 season
- Chairman: Martin Edwards
- Manager: Alex Ferguson
- First Division: 11th
- FA Cup: Sixth round
- League Cup: Third round
- Centenary Trophy: Runners-up
- Top goalscorer: League: Mark Hughes (14 goals); All: Mark Hughes; Brian McClair (16 each)
- Highest home attendance: 55,040 vs Nottingham Forest (18 March 1989)
- Lowest home attendance: 23,368 vs Wimbledon (2 May 1989)
- Average home league attendance: 36,487
Home colours	Away colours	Third colours

The 1988–89 season was Manchester United's 87th season in the Football League, and their 14th consecutive season in the top division of English football. Despite finishing second in the 1987–88 season, Manchester United did not play in the UEFA Cup in 1988–89 due to the ban on English clubs in Europe since the Heysel stadium disaster.

Former Manchester United striker Mark Hughes returned to the club following spells at Barcelona and Bayern Munich, finishing the season as PFA Player of the Year and also as United's joint top scorer alongside Brian McClair with 16 goals in all competitions.

United had tried to sign midfielder Paul Gascoigne from Newcastle United in the close season, but lost out to Tottenham Hotspur.

17-year-old winger Lee Sharpe was signed from Torquay United and became a semi-regular player, appearing either as a left-back or a left-winger. Full-back Lee Martin, who had made his debut at the end of the previous season, became a regular choice on either side of defence during the season. Striker Mark Robins made his debut early in the season and turned out 10 times for the first team, starting just once. Young midfielder Russell Beardsmore scored and set up two goals in United's 3–1 win over Liverpool on New Year's Day, in one of his first appearances for the senior side. Midfielders Deiniol Graham and Tony Gill also broke into the first team during the season, but made only occasional appearances, and Gill suffered a broken ankle which would eventually force him into retirement. 19-year-old winger Giuliano Maiorana was signed from non-league Histon and played six times for the first team, including a highly promising performance in a 1–1 home draw with Arsenal in the league.

Also new to the squad was goalkeeper Jim Leighton, who conceded just 35 goals in 38 league games and kept 15 clean sheets. Mid-season signings were defender Mal Donaghy from Luton Town and winger Ralph Milne from Bristol City. It was the final season at the club for Gordon Strachan, who left in March, and was followed at the end of the season by the departures of Norman Whiteside and Paul McGrath, while Remi Moses retired due to injury.

United had a slow start in the league, including a nine-match winless run incorporating eight draws and a defeat, from September to November, followed by a mid-season run of strong form which lifted them from mid table to the top three, before a run of disappointing results to the season dragged them down to 11th place in the final table. They suffered an early exit from the League Cup and lost their final chance of silverware in March when they were beaten by Nottingham Forest at Old Trafford in the FA Cup quarter-finals.

By the end of the season, it was clear the United squad needed further strengthening to push for honours in 1989–90. For several months, United had been strongly linked to the signature of English international midfielder Neil Webb, who had expressed his desire to leave Nottingham Forest after four successful seasons. A deal was soon agreed to sign the player, along with a deal to sign Norwich City midfielder Mike Phelan.

== Pre-season ==
Manchester United talisman Mark Hughes returned to Old Trafford in 1988 after spells in Europe with Barcelona and Bayern Munich for a club record fee of £1.8 million. But Ferguson's other high-profile target, Paul Gascoigne, turned down an opportunity to move to Manchester United despite a verbal agreement between Ferguson and the player. Ferguson signed Jim Leighton from former club Aberdeen for £750,000 in order to fill the goalkeeping void left by the retiring Gary Bailey, the underperforming Chris Turner and the injury-prone Gary Walsh.

== Season performance ==
Manchester United's inconsistency was highlighted early on, recording three consecutive wins; following the 2–0 victory over West Ham United towards the end of September, before failing to record another one until early December, ten games later. Manchester United also recorded six wins from seven games between Boxing Day 1988 and 11 February 1989 before their league season faltered, recording just three more victories in the season.

With the club failing to achieve in the league, many fans began to realise that the cups would be the only realistic opportunity for silverware. They needed three games to defeat Queens Park Rangers in the FA Cup third round, before scoring four goals against Oxford United in the fourth round. United's three biggest attendances for the season came in the FA Cup, though the campaign eventually ended in defeat at the hands of Brian Clough's Nottingham Forest side in the quarter finals.

Manchester United were also unsuccessful in the season's League Cup; after confidently defeating Rotherham United over two legs, they lost 2–1 to Wimbledon at Plough Lane and were knocked out of the competition.

== Pre-season and friendlies ==
Date	Opponents	H / A	Result F–A	Scorers	Attendance
6 August 1988	Laxå	A	4–0	McClair, Hughes, Olsen, Karlsson (o.g.)	1,521
10 August 1988	Vålerenga	A	0–0		6,296
11 August 1988	Karlstad	A	6–0	McClair, O'Brien, Strachan, Davenport, Hughes, Dalton	3,461
14 August 1988	Trollhättan	A	8–1	Davenport (3), O'Brien, Strachan, McClair, Hughes, Olsen	3,018
16 August 1988	Hamburg	H	0–0		14,348
21 August 1988	Manchester City	H	5–2	McClair (2; 1 pen), Olsen, Hughes, Martin	25,432
3 October 1988	Hibernian	A	3–0	Wilson, Hughes, Robins	14,236
29 November 1988	Birmingham City	A	5–2	Hughes, McClair (pen.), Robson, Blackmore, Robins	8,993
1 March 1989	Queen of the South	A	6–3	McClair (2), Robins (2), Donaghy, Gill (pen.)	3,776
20 May 1989	Histon	N	3–1	Toal, Blackmore, Hughes	

== First Division ==
Date	Opponents	H / A	Result F–A	Scorers	Attendance	League position
27 August 1988	Queens Park Rangers	H	0–0		46,377	10th
3 September 1988	Liverpool	A	0–1		42,026	14th
10 September 1988	Middlesbrough	H	1–0	Robson 70'	40,422	10th
17 September 1988	Luton Town	A	2–0	Davenport 19', Robson 84'	11,010	8th
24 September 1988	West Ham United	H	2–0	Davenport 37', Hughes 67'	39,941	5th
1 October 1988	Tottenham Hotspur	A	2–2	Hughes 43', McClair 72'	29,318	5th
22 October 1988	Wimbledon	A	1–1	Hughes 23'	12,143	7th
26 October 1988	Norwich City	H	1–2	Hughes 59'	36,998	8th
30 October 1988	Everton	A	1–1	Hughes 69'	27,005	10th
5 November 1988	Aston Villa	H	1–1	Bruce 42'	44,804	11th
12 November 1988	Derby County	A	2–2	Hughes 42', McClair 64'	24,080	11th
19 November 1988	Southampton	H	2–2	Robson 16', Hughes 53'	37,277	11th
23 November 1988	Sheffield Wednesday	H	1–1	Hughes 83'	30,849	9th
27 November 1988	Newcastle United	A	0–0		20,350	11th
3 December 1988	Charlton Athletic	H	3–0	Milne 22', McClair 55', Hughes 78'	31,173	9th
10 December 1988	Coventry City	A	0–1		19,936	10th
17 December 1988	Arsenal	A	1–2	Hughes 81'	37,422	10th
26 December 1988	Nottingham Forest	H	2–0	Milne 23', Hughes 53'	39,582	9th
1 January 1989	Liverpool	H	3–1	McClair 71', Hughes 75', Beardsmore 77'	44,745	6th
2 January 1989	Middlesbrough	A	0–1		24,411	9th
14 January 1989	Millwall	H	3–0	Blackmore 12', Gill 23', Hughes 73'	40,931	6th
21 January 1989	West Ham United	A	3–1	Strachan 28', Martin 55', McClair 60'	29,822	6th
5 February 1989	Tottenham Hotspur	H	1–0	McClair 57'	41,423	5th
11 February 1989	Sheffield Wednesday	A	2–0	McClair (2) 37', 61'	34,820	3rd
25 February 1989	Norwich City	A	1–2	McGrath 82'	23,155	5th
12 March 1989	Aston Villa	A	0–0		28,332	7th
25 March 1989	Luton Town	H	2–0	Milne 3', Blackmore 25'	36,335	6th
27 March 1989	Nottingham Forest	A	0–2		30,092	7th
2 April 1989	Arsenal	H	1–1	Adams 85' (o.g.)	37,977	10th
8 April 1989	Millwall	A	0–0		17,523	10th
15 April 1989	Derby County	H	0–2		34,145	10th
22 April 1989	Charlton Athletic	A	0–1		12,055	10th
29 April 1989	Coventry City	H	0–1		29,799	11th
2 May 1989	Wimbledon	H	1–0	McClair 89'	23,368	10th
6 May 1989	Southampton	A	1–2	Beardsmore 54'	17,021	10th
8 May 1989	Queens Park Rangers	A	2–3	Bruce 15', Blackmore 22'	10,017	11th
10 May 1989	Everton	H	1–2	Hughes 32'	26,722	11th
13 May 1989	Newcastle United	H	2–0	McClair 75', Robson 82'	30,379	10th

Pos	Team	Pld	W	D	L	GF	GA	GD	Pts
9	Queens Park Rangers	38	14	11	13	43	37	+6	53
10	Millwall	38	14	11	13	47	52	−5	53
11	Manchester United	38	13	12	13	45	35	+10	51
12	Wimbledon	38	14	9	15	50	46	+4	51
13	Southampton	38	10	15	13	52	66	−14	45

Source: World Football
Rules for classification: 1) Points; 2) Goal difference; 3) Goals scored

== FA Cup ==
Date	Round	Opponents	H / A	Result F–A	Scorers	Attendance
7 January 1989	Round 3	Queens Park Rangers	H	0–0		36,222
11 January 1989	Round 3 Replay	Queens Park Rangers	A	2–2 (a.e.t.)	Gill 75', Graham 104'	22,236
23 January 1989	Round 3 Second Replay	Queens Park Rangers	H	3–0	McClair (2) 55' (pen.), 79', Robson 72'	46,257
28 January 1989	Round 4	Oxford United	H	4–0	Hughes 10', Bruce 61', J. Phillips 63' (o.g.), Robson 82'	47,445
18 February 1989	Round 5	Bournemouth	A	1–1	Hughes 53'	12,708
22 February 1989	Round 5 Replay	Bournemouth	H	1–0	McClair 19'	52,422
18 March 1989	Round 6	Nottingham Forest	H	0–1		55,040

== League Cup ==
Date	Round	Opponents	H / A	Result F–A	Scorers	Attendance
28 September 1988	Round 2 First leg	Rotherham United	A	1–0	Davenport 60'	12,588
12 October 1988	Round 2 Second leg	Rotherham United	H	5–0	McClair (3) 27', 29', 69', Robson 35', Bruce 48'	20,597
2 November 1988	Round 3	Wimbledon	A	1–2	Robson 30'	10,864

== Football League Centenary Trophy ==
Date	Round	Opponents	H / A	Result F–A	Scorers	Attendance
29 August 1988	Quarter-final	Everton	H	1–0	Strachan 66'	16,439
21 September 1988	Semi-final	Newcastle United	H	2–0 (a.e.t.)	Bruce 91', McClair 101'	14,968
9 October 1988	Final	Arsenal	N	1–2	Blackmore 84'	22,182

== Events of the season ==
Before the season began, Paul Gascoigne snubbed Manchester United in favour of a national record move from Newcastle United to Tottenham Hotspur for £2 million, and there was also talk of a similar fee being paid for PSV Eindhoven sweeper Ronald Koeman, who helped the Netherlands win UEFA Euro 1988.

Norman Whiteside and Paul McGrath had been transfer listed at the end of the previous season but the lack of interest in them disappointed Alex Ferguson, who had re-signed striker Mark Hughes from FC Barcelona and brought in goalkeeper Jim Leighton from Aberdeen as successor to Sheffield Wednesday bound Chris Turner. Gordon Strachan agreed terms with Lens of France for a £100,000 transfer, but the deal fell through. Paul McGrath then came off the transfer list at his own request.

On 24 September 1988, Ferguson gave debuts to 17-year-old winger Lee Sharpe and 19-year-old striker Mark Robins in the 2–0 home win over West Ham United in the First Division. This saw United occupy fifth place in the league, level on points with Southampton, a single point behind defending champions Liverpool and newly promoted Millwall, and three points behind surprise leaders Norwich City. However, a 10-match winless league run (8 draws and 2 defeats) followed, dragging them to 11th place in the table by 27 November. The winless streak ended on 3 December with an impressive 3–0 home win over Charlton Athletic.

While United were on their winless streak, they sold out of favour striker Peter Davenport to Middlesbrough for £700,000. They also failed in their Football League Cup quest when they lost 2–1 to Wimbledon at Plough Lane. Brian McClair scored their only goal of the game, while both of Wimbledon's goals were scored by former United striker Terry Gibson.

Alex Ferguson continued to build for the future in November by making a £20,000 move for 21-year-old midfielder Paul Dalton from non-league Brandon United. He also signed 22-year-old winger Giuliano Maiorana from non-league Histon for £30,000.

Five days before Christmas, Jean Busby, wife of former manager and current club president Sir Matt, died after a long illness at the age of 80.

A thrilling clash with Liverpool at Old Trafford on New Year's Day was dominated by 19-year-old midfielder Russell Beardsmore, who scored his first goal for the club and lifted them to sixth in the league, while Liverpool were fifth, and Arsenal and Norwich City were level at the top of the league.

Soon after this successful result, Manchester United were reported to be among the clubs interested in signing Nottingham Forest and England midfielder Neil Webb, who was told by manager Brian Clough that he could leave the City Ground for around £1.5 million after stating that he did not want to sign a new contract.

By 11 February, United were third in the league after a 2–0 win over Sheffield Wednesday that completed a four-match winning run in the First Division, though they were still 11 points behind leaders Arsenal (who had a game in hand) and 8 points behind second placed Norwich City.

Manchester United reached the FA Cup quarter-finals (for the first time since they won the competition four years ago) with a 1–0 home win over AFC Bournemouth in the fifth round replay, but their last chance of silverware ended when they lost 1–0 at home to Nottingham Forest in the FA Cup quarter-final.

Their form in the final weeks of the league campaign was dismal, as they finished 11th at the end of a season which had begun with such high hopes. Alex Ferguson remained determined to turn his side into title contenders, and just after the season ended he joined the race to sign England winger Trevor Steven, who had been put on the transfer list by Everton, but was beaten to his signature by Rangers.

A £600,000 offer for Fiorentina and Sweden defender Glenn Hysén was accepted, but he opted to join Liverpool instead.

Several other high-profile names were also mentioned in the media as Ferguson attempted to strengthen his squad. These included West Ham United midfielder Paul Ince, Southampton winger Danny Wallace and Norwich City midfielder Mike Phelan.

== Squad statistics ==
Pos.	Name	League		FA Cup		League Cup		Total	
Pos.	Name	Apps	Goals	Apps	Goals	Apps	Goals	Apps	Goals
GK	(Scotland) Jim Leighton	38	0	7	0	3	0	48	0
DF	(England) Viv Anderson	5(1)	0	0	0	0(1)	0	6(2)	0
DF	(Wales) Clayton Blackmore	26(2)	3	5(1)	0	3	0	34(3)	3
DF	(England) Steve Bruce	38	2	7	1	3	1	48	4
DF	(Northern Ireland) Mal Donaghy	30	0	7	0	0	0	37	0
DF	(England) Mike Duxbury	16(2)	0	0	0	3	0	19(2)	0
DF	(England) Billy Garton	13(1)	0	0	0	2	0	15(1)	0
DF	(England) Colin Gibson	1(1)	0	0	0	1	0	2(1)	0
DF	(England) Lee Martin	20(4)	1	4(1)	0	0	0	24(5)	1
DF	(Republic of Ireland) Paul McGrath	18(2)	1	4(1)	0	1	0	23(3)	1
MF	(England) Russell Beardsmore	17(6))	2	3(2)	0	1(1)	0	21(9)	2
MF	(England) Tony Gill	4(5)	1	2(2)	0	0	0	6(7)	2
MF	(Wales) Deiniol Graham	0	0	0(1)	1	0	0	0(1)	1
MF	(Scotland) Ralph Milne	19(3)	3	7	0	0	0	26(3)	3
MF	(Republic of Ireland) Liam O'Brien	1(2)	0	0	0	1	0	2(2)	0
MF	(Denmark) Jesper Olsen	6(4)	0	0	0	1(1)	0	7(5)	0
MF	(England) Bryan Robson	34	4	6	2	3	2	43	8
MF	(England) Lee Sharpe	19(3)	0	5(1)	0	2	0	26(4)	0
MF	(Scotland) Gordon Strachan	21	1	5(0)	0	2(1)	0	28(1)	1
MF	(Northern Ireland) Norman Whiteside	6	0	0	0	0	0	6	0
MF	(England) David Wilson	0(4)	0	0(2)	0	0	0	0(6)	0
FW	(Republic of Ireland) Derek Brazil	0(1)	0	0	0	0	0	0(1)	0
FW	(England) Peter Davenport	7(1)	2	0	0	1(1)	1	8(2)	3
FW	(Wales) Mark Hughes	38	14	7	2	3	0	48	16
FW	(England) Giuliano Maiorana	2(4)	0	0	0	0	0	2(4)	0
FW	(Scotland) Brian McClair	38	10	7	3	3	3	48	16
FW	(England) Mark Robins	1(9)	0	1	0	0(1)	0	2(10)	0
