= Class of '92 =

Class of '92 may refer to:

- a generation of football players of Manchester United, see Fergie's Fledglings#The 1990s Fledglings
- The Class of '92, 2013 British documentary film about the footballers
- Class of '92 (snooker), three leading snooker players turned professional in 1992
