= Fergie's Fledglings =

Group of Manchester United players

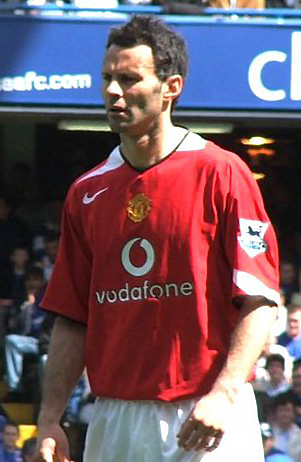
Ryan Giggs, the first of the second wave of Fergie's Fledglings

Fergie's Fledglings were a group of football players recruited by Manchester United under the management of Alex Ferguson (often nicknamed "Fergie") and trained by assistant coaches Brian Kidd and Eric Harrison, before eventually progressing to the first team during the 1990s. The most successful generation of the Fledglings was also known as the Class of '92.

The alliteration in the term is a homage to the Busby Babes, the famously youthful Manchester United team assembled by the club's former manager Matt Busby and his assistant coach Jimmy Murphy during the 1950s.

== Late 1980s Fledglings ==
The term "Fergie's Fledglings" was first coined by the media in the 1988–89 season to describe a group of young footballers who were introduced into the Manchester United first team by the manager Alex Ferguson. The group included players from the team which reached the final of the 1986 FA Youth Cup such as Lee Martin, Tony Gill and David Wilson, and other youth team players such as Russell Beardsmore, Mark Robins and Deiniol Graham as well as young players bought from other clubs such as Lee Sharpe (Torquay United) and Giuliano Maiorana (Histon).

The 1988–89 season was Ferguson's third in charge at Old Trafford. His predecessor, Ron Atkinson, had guided United to two FA Cup victories and five successive top-four league finishes, but more than 20 years had passed since the club's last league title triumph, in spite of the attempts of different managers to achieve this, which had seen numerous moves being made in the transfer market as well as the inclusion of young players who had come through the youth and reserve teams.

There was some initial success for the Fledglings; in only his second start, Beardsmore inspired the team to a 3–1 win over rivals Liverpool, scoring a goal and setting up the other two, and an injury crisis saw Gill, Graham and Wilson drafted into the first team for an FA Cup third round replay against Queens Park Rangers in which both Gill and Graham scored; however, serious injuries and a failure to build on good early form meant that most of these players did not live up to their initial success and the term "Fergie's Fledglings" was largely abandoned by 1991. Beardsmore and Robins made over 50 appearances each for Manchester United, but failed to establish themselves at the highest level and both players had moved on by their mid-20s. However, Robins did score a winning goal against Nottingham Forest in the Third Round of the 1989–90 FA Cup and went on to score two more goals in the competition that season, including the winning goal in the semi-final replay against Oldham Athletic. The goal against Nottingham Forest is popularly believed to have saved Ferguson's job at United, as they were struggling in the league at this stage and Ferguson had entered his fourth year as the club's manager having still yet to win a major trophy.

Of the original batch of Fledglings, only Martin and Sharpe made more than 100 appearances for Manchester United, and they and Robins made important contributions towards two of Ferguson's first trophies – the FA Cup in 1990 and the UEFA Cup Winners' Cup in 1991. Martin scored the winning goal in the 1990 FA Cup final replay against Crystal Palace. However, Sharpe was the only one of this group of players left at the club by the end of the 1993–94 season, and by the time he was sold to Leeds United in August 1996, he had played in three title-winning teams, two FA Cup-winning teams, and also won both a Cup Winners' Cup, a Football League Cup and three FA Community Shields, and he was voted PFA Young Player of the Year in 1991. He also won eight England caps, but the second half of his career was largely disappointing and he played his last senior game In 2002 at the age of 31.

Mark Robins was the only member of the original batch of fledglings to enjoy any major success with other clubs. After being sold to Norwich City in 1992, he scored 15 goals as his new club finished third in the new Premier League, and also achieved promotion and a Football League Cup triumph with his next club Leicester City. Robins would finish his playing career well into the 21st century at the lower levels and upon retirement moved straight into club management, most notably winning two promotions and a Football League Trophy at Coventry City.

== 1990s Fledglings ==
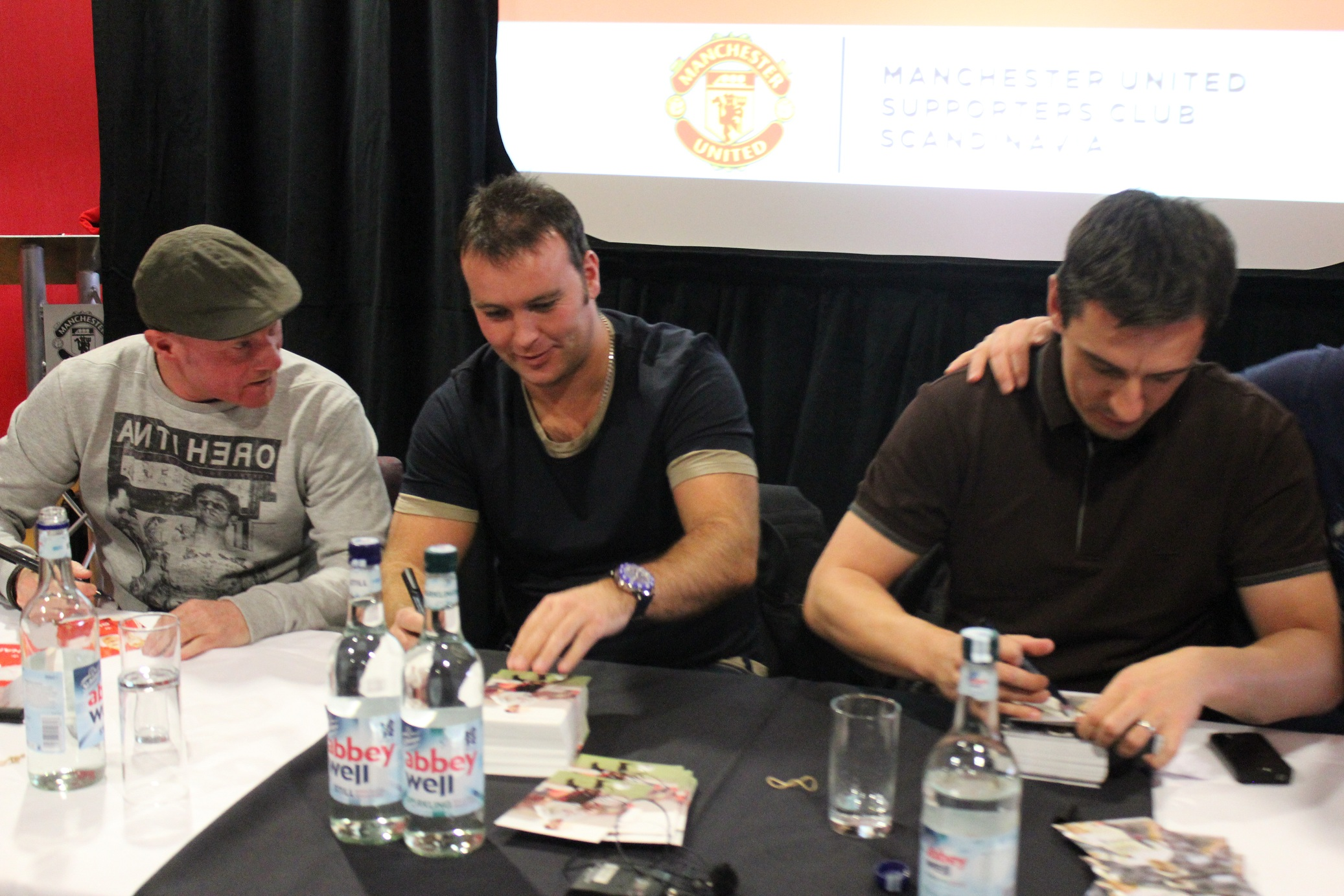
George Switzer, Ben Thornley and Gary Neville

A second wave of young players emerged at Manchester United in the early to mid-1990s. This group proved far more successful than the late 1980s generation of players in terms of the success they achieved in the short and long term. Each one was developed by Manchester United from a very early age, some signing schoolboy forms with the club at the age of just 14. Many of these players were part of the Manchester United team that won the 1992 FA Youth Cup, including future United regulars David Beckham, Nicky Butt, Ryan Giggs and Gary Neville. Also generally considered in this group are players such as Paul Scholes, an FA Youth Cup finalist in 1993 and Phil Neville – Gary's younger brother – who was a substitute in the 1993 FA Youth Cup Final and captained the team to the 1995 FA Youth Cup. The six players have since been collectively referred to as the "Class of '92", a term popularised by the namesake 2013 documentary focusing on their careers with the club.

The term "Fergie's Fledglings" came back into common usage during the 1995–96 season, after Ferguson largely used this second group of youngsters coming through to replace a number of distinguished older players who had left the club. Following a 3–1 opening day away defeat to Aston Villa, pundit Alan Hansen commented on Match of the Day "You'll never win anything with kids".

United had just sold established key players Paul Ince, Mark Hughes and Andrei Kanchelskis in the aftermath of their first trophyless season of the 1990s, and had not made any major signings that summer, despite the likes of Arsenal, Chelsea, Everton, Liverpool and Newcastle United spending millions in the transfer market.

The young side, with an average age of just 24, then went on to overturn Newcastle United's 10-point Christmas lead to win the club's third league title in four years. This was followed up by a 1–0 win over Liverpool in the 1996 FA Cup Final to secure the Double. A period of great success followed, the most outstanding triumph being The Treble in 1999. Many of the players remained a key part of the team's successes for a decade or more.

Many of the so-called "Class of '92" became regulars for both club and country during this time. David Beckham, Nicky Butt and Phil Neville moved on in 2003 (to Real Madrid), 2004 (to Newcastle United) and 2005 (to Everton) respectively, with Beckham also captaining England from 2000 to 2006. Butt later returned to United as member of the coaching staff.

Gary Neville remained at United for the rest of his career and held the post of team captain following the departure of Roy Keane in 2005, before injuries considerably reduced his appearances, prompting his retirement in February 2011. Upon the announcement, Alex Ferguson described Neville as "the greatest English right-back of his generation". Among defenders, only Bill Foulkes made more appearances for the club than Neville. Neville received a testimonial match in 2011, also attended by five other "Fergie Fledglings": Beckham, Giggs, Scholes, Butt, and Phil Neville.

Ryan Giggs and Paul Scholes both played their entire Premier League careers for Manchester United. Scholes announced his retirement at the end of the 2010–11 season, remaining at the club as a youth coach, but made a return to playing duties in January 2012 after several United midfielders were brought down by injury before retiring again at the conclusion of the 2012–13 season. Giggs went on to win more trophies than any other player in football history. Coming on as a substitute in the 2008 UEFA Champions League Final, he became the club's all-time appearance record holder, surpassing Bobby Charlton, the longest-serving of the Busby Babes. After briefly serving as player-manager at the end of the 2013–14 season, Giggs went on to hold the post of assistant manager at the club, but left in the summer of 2016.

Beckham, Scholes, Butt and Gary Neville returned to play for Manchester United in a friendly match at the end of the 2018–19 season to mark the 20th anniversary of the Treble campaign in 1999. Beckham and Butt both scored as Manchester United won 5–0 at Old Trafford on 26 May 2019.

== List of Fergie's Fledglings ==
1980s

- Russell Beardsmore
- Adrian Doherty
- Tony Gill
- Deiniol Graham
- Giuliano Maiorana
- Lee Martin
- Mark Robins
- Lee Sharpe
- Alan Tonge
- Gary Walsh
- David Wilson

1990s

- Michael Appleton
- David Beckham
- Grant Brebner
- Wes Brown
- Nicky Butt
- Chris Casper
- Luke Chadwick
- Michael Clegg
- Terry Cooke
- John Curtis
- Nick Culkin
- Simon Davies
- Adrian Doherty
- Darren Ferguson
- Ryan Giggs
- Keith Gillespie
- David Healy
- Danny Higginbotham
- Pat McGibbon
- Colin McKee
- Phillip Mulryne
- Gary Neville
- Phil Neville
- Alex Notman
- John O'Kane
- Kevin Pilkington
- Robbie Savage
- Paul Scholes
- Michael Stewart
- Ben Thornley
- Michael Twiss
- Ronnie Wallwork
- Danny Webber
- Mark Wilson

2000s

- Ben Amos
- Phil Bardsley
- Michael Barnes
- Robbie Brady
- Fraizer Campbell
- James Chester
- Tom Cleverley
- Jimmy Davis
- Chris Eagles
- Sylvan Ebanks-Blake
- Adam Eckersley
- Richard Eckersley
- Corry Evans
- Jonny Evans
- Darren Fletcher
- Ezekiel Fryers
- Darron Gibson
- Tom Heaton
- Ritchie Jones
- Kieran Lee
- Mark Lynch
- Michael Keane
- Will Keane
- Joshua King
- Lee Martin
- Paul McShane
- Ravel Morrison
- Daniel Nardiello
- John O'Shea
- Danny Pugh
- Paul Rachubka
- Giuseppe Rossi
- Kieran Richardson
- Lee Roche
- Ryan Shawcross
- Danny Simpson
- Jonathan Spector
- Paul Tierney
- Mads Timm
- Ryan Tunnicliffe
- Marnick Vermijl
- Danny Welbeck
- Richie Wellens
- Scott Wootton

== See also ==
- Busby Babes
- The Class of '92, a 2013 film documenting the 1992 youngsters
