= University Academy 92 =

College in Greater Manchester, England

University Academy 92 (UA92)
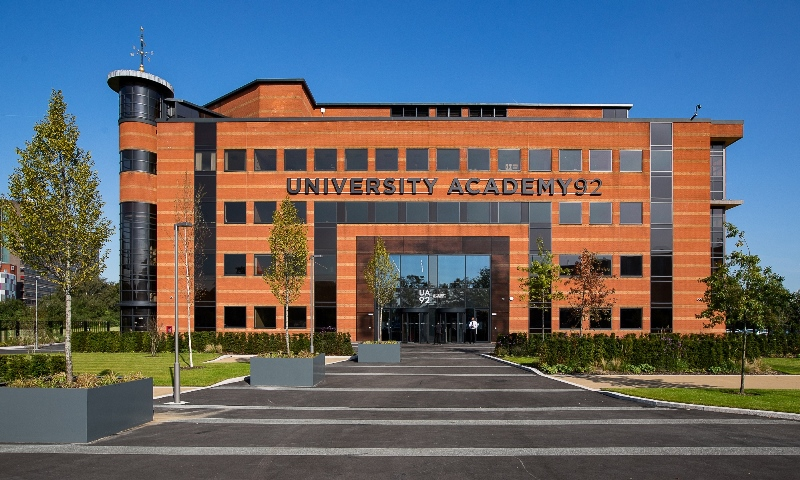
- University Academy 92 (UA92) campus, Manchester, UK.
- Type: Higher Education Institution
- Established: 2017
- Officer in charge: Sara Prowse (CEO)
- Students: 1000+
- Undergraduates: 1000+
- Location: Old Trafford, Greater Manchester, England
- Campus: 100,000 sq ft (9,300 m^{2}); Urban
- Colours: Red, black, white
- Website: www.ua92.ac.uk

University Academy 92 (UA92) is a higher education institution based in Greater Manchester, England, offering undergraduate degrees and apprenticeship programmes.

UA92 was co-founded by Lancaster University and members of Manchester United's Class of '92: Gary Neville, Ryan Giggs, Paul Scholes, Phil Neville and Nicky Butt.

== History ==
UA92 was first announced in September 2017, with plans to offer “broader courses than traditional degrees, designed to enhance life skills as well as employability”. The institution was founded on three core principles: Social Mobility, Inclusivity and Accessibility. Following their successful football careers, the founders aimed to create an institution that would attract students who "otherwise might not go on to higher education".

UA92 officially opened in September 2019 in Old Trafford, Manchester. The Times described it as “a venture setting out to help disadvantaged young people in Manchester get a better education, with a new university that explicitly draws on the strategies and mindset of elite sport".

In January 2021, UA92 was added to the Office for Students register of higher education institutions, following an inspection by the Quality Assurance Agency for Higher Education (QAA).

In December 2021, it was awarded £2 million in funding by the Office for Students to develop a new Digital Academy on campus. UA92 stated that “the new academy will increase UA92’s student capacity for digital students almost tenfold – from 65 to 634”. The Digital Academy officially opened in 2022.

In April 2023, UA92 launched a health and wellness performance centre in the basement of the Old Trafford campus. The facility includes a multi-lane Mondo running track, elite strength and conditioning racks and a cardio studio.

In September 2023, UA92 became the youngest higher education institution to be awarded an overall rating of Silver in the Teaching Excellence Framework (TEF) by the Office for Students (OfS).

== Academic Profile and Courses ==
=== Degree Programmes ===
UA92's undergraduate courses are organised around four main specialist subject areas: Business, Media, Sport and Digital.

UA92 collaborates closely with industry partners to design curricula aligned with contemporary business and employment needs. Current partners include Microsoft, KPMG, Manchester United and Lancashire County Cricket Club.

=== Academic Model ===
UA92's academic structure operates on a year-round calendar, worth 120 credits per year. Each degree is divided into six-week teaching blocks, with one module taught at a time. Students can begin their studies at five entry points throughout the year: September, November, January, February and April.

Teaching is delivered in fixed morning or afternoon sessions for the duration of each student's degree, a model designed to make higher education more accessible to learners from a range of educational and socio-economic backgrounds.

Assessment takes place within each teaching block, with no traditional end-of-year examinations, except for the BA (Hons) Accounting and Finance degree, where exams remain an industry standard.

=== Undergraduate Courses ===
UA92 offers a range of undergraduate qualifications, including the traditional three-year degrees, two-year accelerated degrees and Certificates of Higher Education (Cert HEs).

==== Business ====
- BSc (Hons) Business of Football
- BA (Hons) Digital Marketing
- BSc (Hons) Accounting and Business Management
- BA (Hons) Accounting and Finance
- BSc (Hons) Business Management
- BA (Hons) Sports Management

==== Sport ====
- BSc (Hons) Health, Exercise and Sport
- BSc (Hons) Sports and Exercise Science
- BA (Hons) Physical Education
- BSc (Hons) Sports Coaching

==== Media ====
- BA (Hons) Sports Journalism
- BA (Hons) Sports Media and Communications
- BA (Hons) Football Broadcast and Journalism (For September 2026 entry)
- BA (Hons) Digital Content Production (For September 2026 entry)

==== Digital ====
- BSc (Hons) Computer Science
- BSc (Hons) Cyber Security

==== Certificates of Higher Education (Cert HEs) ====
UA92 offers a variety of Cert HEs, including:

- Business of Football Cert HE
- Digital Marketing Cert HE
- Accounting and Business Management Cert HE
- Accounting Cert HE
- Business Management Cert HE
- Software Development Cert HE
- Cyber Security Cert HE
- Exercise Studies Cert HE
- Sports and Exercise Science Cert HE
- Physical Education Cert HE
- Sports Coaching Cert HE
- Sports Journalism Cert HE
- Sports Management Cert HE
- Sports Media and Communications Cert HE

=== Character and Personal Development ===
UA92 places character and personal development at the centre of its educational philosophy through the '92 Programme'. This initiative focuses on cultivating professional and interpersonal skills, and is inspired by the principles instilled by Alex Ferguson in the Class of '92, reimagined for the higher education experience.

== Campus locations ==
Although local opinion on the project was divided during the planning application stage, Trafford Council approved plans for the establishment of UA92 in January 2018. A subsequent vote in August 2018 granted approval for the campus development. Construction began in October 2018, converting the former Kellogg's building into UA92's main campus.

The main Old Trafford campus comprises approximately 100,000 square feet. UA92 initially occupied the ground and first floors (around 50,000 square feet), with the option to expand into the upper two floors in later academic years. This was done in 2022, with the opening of UA92's Digital Academy.

The campus was officially opened on 20th September 2019 on Brian Statham Way, Old Trafford, Manchester, with Gary Neville describing the project as "potentially the biggest thing we've ever done".

In 2020, Microsoft opened a new flagship office within UA92's Old Trafford Campus.

In 2023, UA92 announced the expansion of its facilities with a new Business School, located at Bruntwood's Baskerville House, opposite Salford Central Railway Station. The Business School officially opened in October 2023, two years ahead of schedule, providing 36,000 square feet of space for up to 1000 further students.

In 2025, UA92 signed a new five-year contract with Lancashire Cricket Club, allowing media students to be taught in the Players and Media Centre at Emirates Old Trafford.

In December 2025, UA92 announced that it was expanding with new teaching facilities at Manchester United's Old Trafford Stadium. Students and their lecturers will have access to suites and rooms in the Sir Bobby Charlton Stand, with classes being held there throughout the academic year. The stadium's media facilities will also be available to support students on media courses, offering hands-on experience in a professional setting.

== Initiatives ==
In 2021, UA92 launched the 'Make It For Real' campaign to support students from disadvantaged backgrounds. Eligible students receive a Microsoft Surface Pro laptop, unlimited TalkTalk data for three years, lunch vouchers, £150 Dunelm home vouchers and free travel to and from campus. To qualify, applicants are required to have been eligible for free school meals in their final year at school or college.

The initiative was inspired by Marcus Rashford’s campaign for free school meals for primary school children across the United Kingdom.

In November 2021, Wes Streeting MP, the Shadow Child Poverty Secretary, visited the UA92 campus to discuss the initiative and wider approaches to educational equality. He described the £5,000 support package as “a shining example of positive action to help young people from disadvantaged backgrounds access higher education”.

In 2023, UA92 introduced the 'Greatness Unlocked' scholarship programme, offering full tuition funding for two students from disadvantaged backgrounds across Greater Manchester. Two additional students were awarded the scholarship in 2024. In 2025, the scholarship was rebranded as 'Unlock Your Greatness', allowing students to apply directly for the first time.

== Apprenticeships ==
UA92 launched its apprenticeship programmes in January 2023, initially focusing on digital and technology related disciplines. Mirroring the structure of its undergraduate degrees, the programmes were developed in collaboration with industry partners and combine academic study with personal and professional development, as well as practical real-world experience.

As part of its apprenticeship provision, UA92 has partnered with organisations including Manchester United, JD Group, TalkTalk and THG.

As of 2025, UA92 offers eight apprenticeship pathways: Level 3 Mult-Channel Marketer, Level 3 Information Communication Technician, Level 3 Cyber Security Technician, Level 4 DevOps Engineer, Level 4 Data Analyst, Level 6 Data Scientist and Level 6 Digital Marketer.

== Disputes ==
In August 2017, UA92's approval by the Department of Education to use the name 'University Academy 92' drew criticism from some observers, who argued the decision made it "too easy" for new institutions to include the term 'university' in their name.

In July 2018, it was reported that UA92 had filed a lawsuit against Brendan Flood, founder of the University Campus of Football Business (UCFB). The suit alleged trademark infringement after Flood registered several companies and trademarks incorporating the name UA92 shortly after the institution's announcement. UA92 sought an injunction to prevent the use of the name.

== Staff ==
Dr Marnie Millard OBE, former Group Chief Executive of Nichols PLC, the home of Vimto, joined the UA92 Board as Chair in 2019.

In 2021, Sara Prowse was appointed CEO of UA92. Prowse has over 30 years of experience leading and developing well-known retail and lifestyle brands, including Hotter Shoes, Lands End and ISME at Shop Direct (now The Very Group).

In 2025, UA92 appointed Emma Neville as its Women's Health Ambassador. Neville, an accredited menopause coach and founder of This Is Me, an online menopause community, was tasked with supporting the development of UA92's women's health policies, raising awareness and providing support for students.

== Notable students ==
- Ava Crean, Irish long-distance runner.
