= Ava Crean =

Irish long-distance runner

Personal information
- Nationality: Irish

Sport
- Sport: Athletics
- Event: Long-distance running

Achievements and titles
- Personal best(s): Marathon: 2:34:12 (Dublin, 2025)

Ava Crean is an Irish long-distance runner. In 2025, Crean became the youngest Irish national champion in the women's marathon, at the age of 19 years-old, in only her third race at the distance.

== Biography ==
Crean is from Mungret in County Limerick. Crean took part in climbing, karate and camogie in her youth as well as playing basketball, and was a member of the Irish U-17 national basketball team academy.

Crean started running to stay fit during the COVID-19 pandemic, but initially completed most of her training on a treadmill, saying that she "didn't want to run outside because I was kind of embarrassed". After the pandemic, she enrolled in an exercise science degree at University Academy 92, in Greater Manchester, England.

Crean made her marathon debut at the Manchester Marathon in April 2025, listing her target time as 3:30 but finishing close to an hour faster in 2:49. In May, she ran her second marathon with a time of 2:43:26 in Limerick. She became a member of Back 2 Boston running club in Limerick, and coached by John Kinsella.

In September 2025, Crean, won the Charleville Half Marathon in 1:15:22, and then the Manchester Half Marathon in 1:14:06. In October 2025, at the age of 19 years-old, Crean won the Irish national title at the Dublin Marathon, in a time of 2:34:11 with which she placed sixth overall, and was a nine-minute personal best. The time put her second on the Irish women's marathon 2025 list behind Fionnuala McCormack, and placed her 13th on the Irish all-time list. She also became the youngest ever winner of the Irish women's national marathon title.

On 11 January 2026, she ran a personal best for the 10 km to 32:46 whilst competing in Valencia.
