= Eric Harrison (footballer) =

English footballer and manager (1938–2019)

Eric Harrison MBE
Personal information
- Full name: Eric George Harrison
- Date of birth: 5 February 1938
- Place of birth: Mytholmroyd, Yorkshire, England
- Date of death: 13 February 2019 (aged 81)
- Position: Wing half

Senior career*
Years	Team	Apps	(Gls)
1957–1964	Halifax Town	199	(10)
1964–1966	Hartlepools United	81	(4)
1966–1969	Barrow	130	(1)
1969–1971	Southport	75	(0)
1971–1972	Barrow	32	(1)
1972	Scarborough		

Managerial career
- 1981–1998: Manchester United (youth team coach)
- 2000–2004: Wales (assistant)
- 1998–2008: Manchester United (coaching co-ordinator)
- * Club domestic league appearances and goals

Eric George Harrison MBE (5 February 1938 – 13 February 2019) was an English professional football player and coach. He played in midfield for several teams, including notable spells at Halifax Town (his local club) and Barrow. Harrison became a football coach and worked at Everton before he was brought to Manchester United by Ron Atkinson in 1981 to manage the youth team. Under Alex Ferguson, Harrison developed "one of the best crops of young players in the English game" – the so-called Fergie's Fledglings – which included David Beckham, Ryan Giggs, Paul Scholes and Gary Neville.

== Playing career ==
Harrison began his football career as a player with his local club, Halifax Town, and made 199 league appearances between 1957 and 1964. After seven years with Halifax, he joined Hartlepools United, where he played until the 1965–66 season before joining Barrow in 1966. At Barrow, he was noted as a strong midfield player who played a key role in securing the club's promotion to the Third Division in 1967. He was at Southport from 1969 to 1971 before returning to Barrow for the 1971–72 season. In all, he made 162 league appearances for Barrow and a further 25 in other competitions, scoring three goals. He left Barrow for Scarborough in 1972.

== Coaching career ==
After retiring from playing Harrison entered coaching. In June 1981, he was hired from Everton by new Manchester United manager Ron Atkinson, with whom Harrison had played for the Royal Air Force football team, Harrison took the post of youth team manager. It was his responsibility to help guide the club's young players and mould them into future first-teamers. When Atkinson was sacked in 1986, his replacement, Alex Ferguson, decided to keep Harrison on as youth coach. Dissatisfied with the number of players coming through the United youth system, Ferguson called a meeting with Harrison to discuss potential improvements. Harrison pointed out that he had already made Norman Whiteside and a couple of others into first team players, but Ferguson argued that this was still not enough. Harrison retorted "Right, we'll do a deal. You get me better-quality players, and I'll get you more youngsters in the first team." Ferguson agreed and set about increasing the club's scouting network two-or-threefold.

Harrison's set-up subsequently produced a crop of first team players that became known as "Fergie's Fledglings" or "the class of '92". These included David Beckham, Ryan Giggs, Nicky Butt, Gary Neville and Robbie Savage. Harrison managed the Manchester United youth team that included many of these players and won the 1992 FA Youth Cup. The group has been described as "one of the best crops of young players in the English game". In 1993, Harrison introduced Paul Scholes, Phil Neville and Keith Gillespie to first team football. In 1995, a Harrison-coached team, captained by Phil Neville, won the FA Youth Cup again. Other players brought through the Manchester United youth team by Harrison include Mark Hughes, Norman Whiteside, Clayton Blackmore and Graeme Hogg. In 1998, Harrison retired as youth team manager but continued as coaching co-ordinator, working with groups from the under-nines to the under-16s, until he left Manchester United around 2008.

From 2000 to 2004, Harrison was assistant manager of the Wales national football team under Mark Hughes.

== Later life ==
In 2014, Harrison was diagnosed with mixed dementia, a condition that his own father had also lived with in his later years, and went to live in a nursing home. Harrison was appointed a Member of the Order of the British Empire for his services to football in the 2018 New Year Honours. As he was unable to travel to London, he received his honour at Halifax Town's ground, The Shay.

== Death ==
Harrison died on 13 February 2019 at the age of 81. He was surrounded by his wife of 56 years, Shirley and two daughters.
