= Adrian Doherty =

Northern Irish footballer (1973–2000)

Personal information
- Date of birth: 10 June 1973
- Place of birth: Strabane, Northern Ireland
- Date of death: 9 June 2000 (aged 26)
- Place of death: The Hague, Netherlands
- Position: Winger

Youth career
- 1987–1992: Manchester United

Senior career*
Years	Team	Apps	(Gls)
1990–1992	Manchester United	0	(0)
1993–1994	Derry City	3	(1)
- * Club domestic league appearances and goals

Adrian Doherty (10 June 1973 – 9 June 2000) was a Northern Irish footballer who played as a winger for Manchester United and Derry City. Once hailed as a prodigious talent, and a contemporary of the "Class of '92", a serious knee injury ended his career prematurely. He died at the age of 26 after moving to The Hague in the Netherlands.

== Football career ==
Doherty was born in Strabane on 10 June 1973, the son of Geraldine and Jimmy Doherty, a former footballer himself. As a 13-year-old, he attended trials at Nottingham Forest and Arsenal, but his coach at Moorfield Boys' Club, Matt Bradley, wrote a letter to the Manchester United manager Alex Ferguson urging them to take a look at Doherty, and in August 1987, alongside the future Celtic, Liverpool and Leicester City manager Brendan Rodgers, he was invited to attend a trial.

Manchester United offered Doherty an apprentice contract, but he found it hard to adapt to his new life away from Strabane, and outside of training he would go busking in Manchester city centre or write poetry, and he would play guitar around Old Trafford and the club's training ground, The Cliff.

He starred for the 'A', 'B' team and the reserves, and was taken with the first-team travelling party for a match against Southampton at The Dell in March 1990; however, he was not included in the matchday squad. Around that time, Northern Ireland manager Billy Bingham sought to include him in the Under-21 squad for a match against Israel, but Alex Ferguson blocked the move, as he considered Doherty too young. The club offered him a five-year contract later the same year but he declined, instead opting for a three-year deal, not wishing to be constrained by a long contract. He was only the second player in history, after Duncan Edwards, to sign a professional contract as a sixteen-year-old.

On 23 February 1991, a week before Ferguson had planned to give Doherty his first-team debut, he suffered a cruciate ligament injury while playing in a reserve game against Carlisle United. Although he made various comebacks throughout the rest of the year, including a youth tournament in Zurich and an end-of-season friendly in Trinidad, the injury would end his Manchester United career. After the expiry of his contract, he played three times for League of Ireland side Derry City, the same team his father had played for, scoring on his debut against Cobh Ramblers.

== After football ==
While injured in 1991, Doherty pursued other, non-sporting interests. He formed a band called The Mad Hatters and spent a month in early 1992 living in New York's East Village, performing under the name McHillbilly, in the hope of landing a record deal.

He later spent time working in a chocolate factory in Preston, Lancashire, then at a hosiery factory in his hometown of Strabane, then working various jobs in Galway. In 2000, he took up work for a Dutch furniture company in The Hague.

== Death ==
On 7 May 2000, Doherty was found unconscious in a canal in The Hague. He spent more than a month in a coma in hospital, before dying on 9 June, a day before his 27th birthday. There were no drugs in his system, and his death was ruled by Dutch police to be an accident.

== Sources ==
- Irish Football Handbook 1994-95 by Dave Galvin and Gerry Desmond (ISBN 0951798715)
