= FWA Tribute Award =

Annual football award

The Football Writers' Association Tribute Award (often called the FWA Tribute Award, or simply the Tribute Award) is given by the Football Writers Association to an individual that the committee feels has made an outstanding contribution to the national game.

The award was first given in 1983, and was won by Ron Greenwood.

In 2024, Emma Hayes won the award, the first female recipient in its 42 year history.

== All-time winners ==
Season	Person	Nationality
1982–83	Ron Greenwood	England
1983–84	Bob Paisley	England
1984–85	Trevor Brooking	England
1985–86	Pat Jennings	Northern Ireland
1986–87	Kenny Dalglish	Scotland
1987–88	Tom Finney	England
1988–89	Bobby Charlton	England
1989–90	Bobby Moore	England
1990–91	Peter Shilton	England
1991–92	Bobby Robson	England
1992–93	Brian Clough	England
1993–94	Denis Law	Scotland
1994–95	Stanley Matthews	England
1995–96	Alex Ferguson	Scotland
1996–97	Gary Lineker	England
1997–98	Geoff Hurst	England
1998–99	Jim Smith	England
1999–2000	George Best	Northern Ireland
2000–01	Alan Shearer	England
2001–02	Graham Taylor	England
2002–03	Tony Adams	England
2003–04	Jimmy Hill	England
2004–05	Arsène Wenger	France
2005–06	Bryan Robson	England
2006–07	Ryan Giggs	Wales
2007–08	David Beckham	England
2008–09	Harry Redknapp	England
2009–10	Frank Lampard	England
2010–11	Thierry Henry	France
2011–12	Gary Neville	England
2011–12	Paul Scholes	England
2012–13	Steven Gerrard	England
2013–14	José Mourinho	Portugal
2014–15	Didier Drogba	Ivory Coast
2015–16	Patrick Vieira	France
2016–17	Wayne Rooney	England
2017–18	Pelé	Brazil
2018–19	Gareth Southgate	England
2019–20	Vincent Kompany	Belgium
2020–21	Marcus Rashford	England
2022–23	Yaya Touré	Ivory Coast
2023–24	Emma Hayes	England
2024–25	Dennis Bergkamp	Netherlands
2025–26	Sarina Wiegman	Netherlands

== Winners by country ==
Country	Number of wins
England	27
Scotland	3
France	3
Ivory Coast	2
Northern Ireland	2
Wales	1
Portugal	1
Brazil	1
Belgium	1
Netherlands	1
