= Paul Scholes =

English footballer (born 1974)

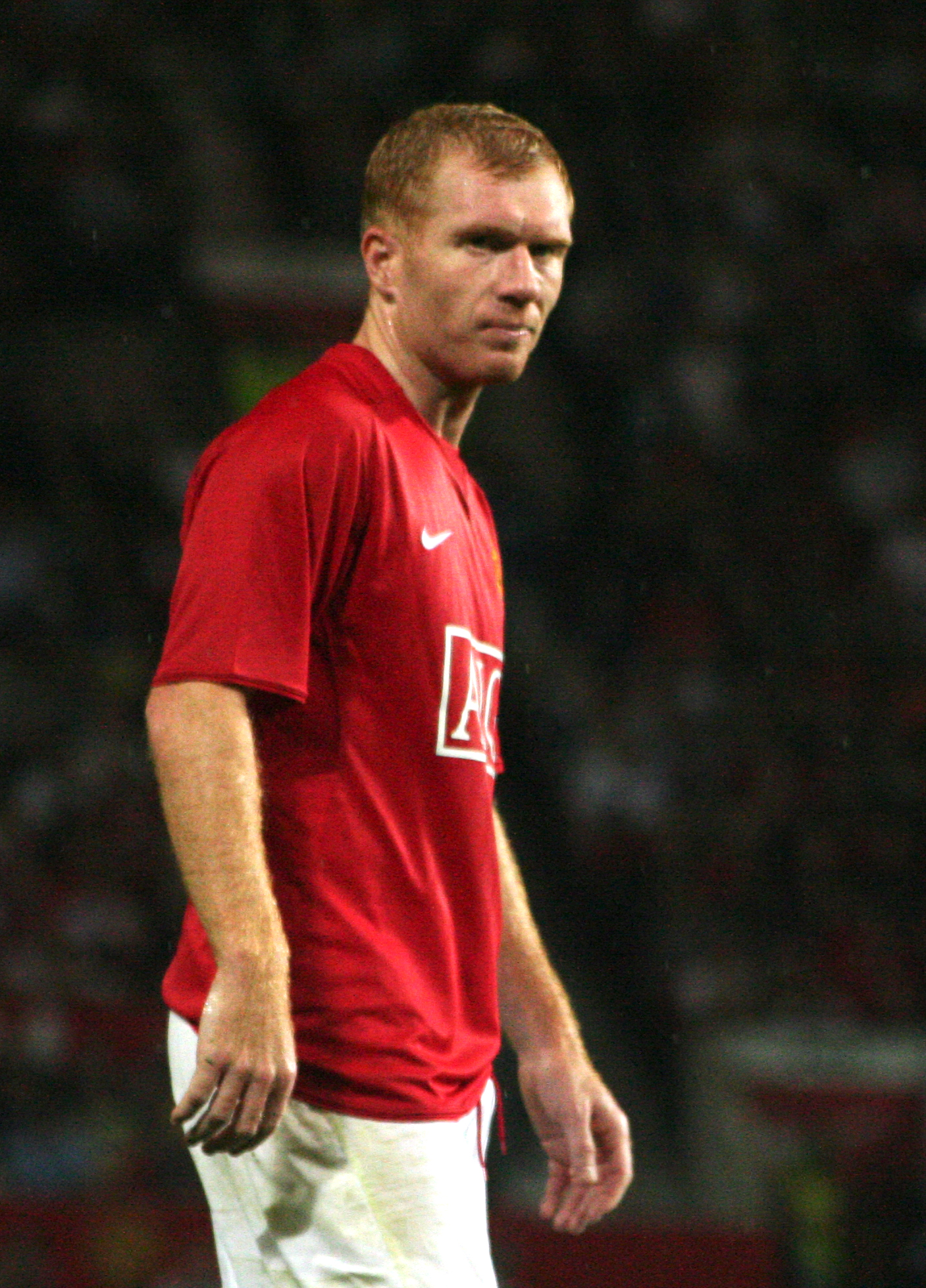
- Scholes playing for Manchester United in 2008

Personal information
- Full name: Paul Scholes
- Date of birth: 16 November 1974 (age 52)
- Place of birth: Salford, Greater Manchester, England
- Height: 5 ft 6 in (1.68 m)
- Position: Midfielder

Youth career
- Langley Furrow
- 1991–1993: Manchester United

Senior career*
Years	Team	Apps	(Gls)
1993–2011	Manchester United	466	(102)
2012–2013	Manchester United	33	(5)
2018	Royston Town	2	(0)
Total		501	(107)

International career
1993	England U18	4	(1)
1997–2004	England	66	(14)

Managerial career
- 2015: Salford City (caretaker)
- 2019: Oldham Athletic
- 2020: Salford City (interim)
- * Club domestic league appearances and goals

Paul Scholes (born 16 November 1974) is an English former professional footballer, pundit, and coach. Widely regarded as one of the greatest midfielders of his generation, Scholes spent his entire professional playing career with Manchester United, for whom he scored over 150 goals in more than 700 appearances between 1993 and 2013. Scholes won 25 trophies, including 11 Premier League titles (more than any other English player), three FA Cups, and two UEFA Champions League titles. He is renowned for his technical skills, accurate passing, intelligent movement, powerful shooting from long range, and goal-scoring ability.

Scholes came through the Manchester United academy as one of Fergie's Fledglings, a group of players recruited by the club under the management of Alex Ferguson. He made his full debut in the 1994–95 season. He went on to make 718 appearances for the club, the third-highest number of appearances by any player. He announced his retirement from playing in May 2011 and was appointed as a coach at Manchester United. He returned to playing in January 2012, and played one more season for the club before retiring again in May 2013.

Scholes represented the England national team from 1997 to 2004, gaining 66 caps and participating in the 1998 and 2002 FIFA World Cups, as well as the 2000 and 2004 UEFA European Championships. He announced his retirement from international football in August 2004, citing his family life and his club career with Manchester United as being more important.

Scholes' first managerial position was at Oldham Athletic, for 31 days in February and March 2019. In 2020, he had a short spell as interim manager of Salford City.

== Early life ==
Scholes was born on 16 November 1974 in Salford, Greater Manchester. He is of part Irish and Northern Irish descent on his mother's side. The family moved to Langley, Greater Manchester, when he was 18 months old, where he lived on Bowness Road and Talkin Drive. Growing up, Scholes supported Oldham Athletic. He attended the St Mary's RC Primary School in Langley. The first team he played for was Langley Furrow. Scholes also excelled at cricket. At age 14, he began training with Manchester United. He later joined as a trainee upon leaving the Cardinal Langley Roman Catholic High School in Middleton during the summer of 1991. In his final term at school, he was selected to represent Great Britain National Schools in football.

== Club career ==
=== Manchester United ===
==== 1993–1999 ====
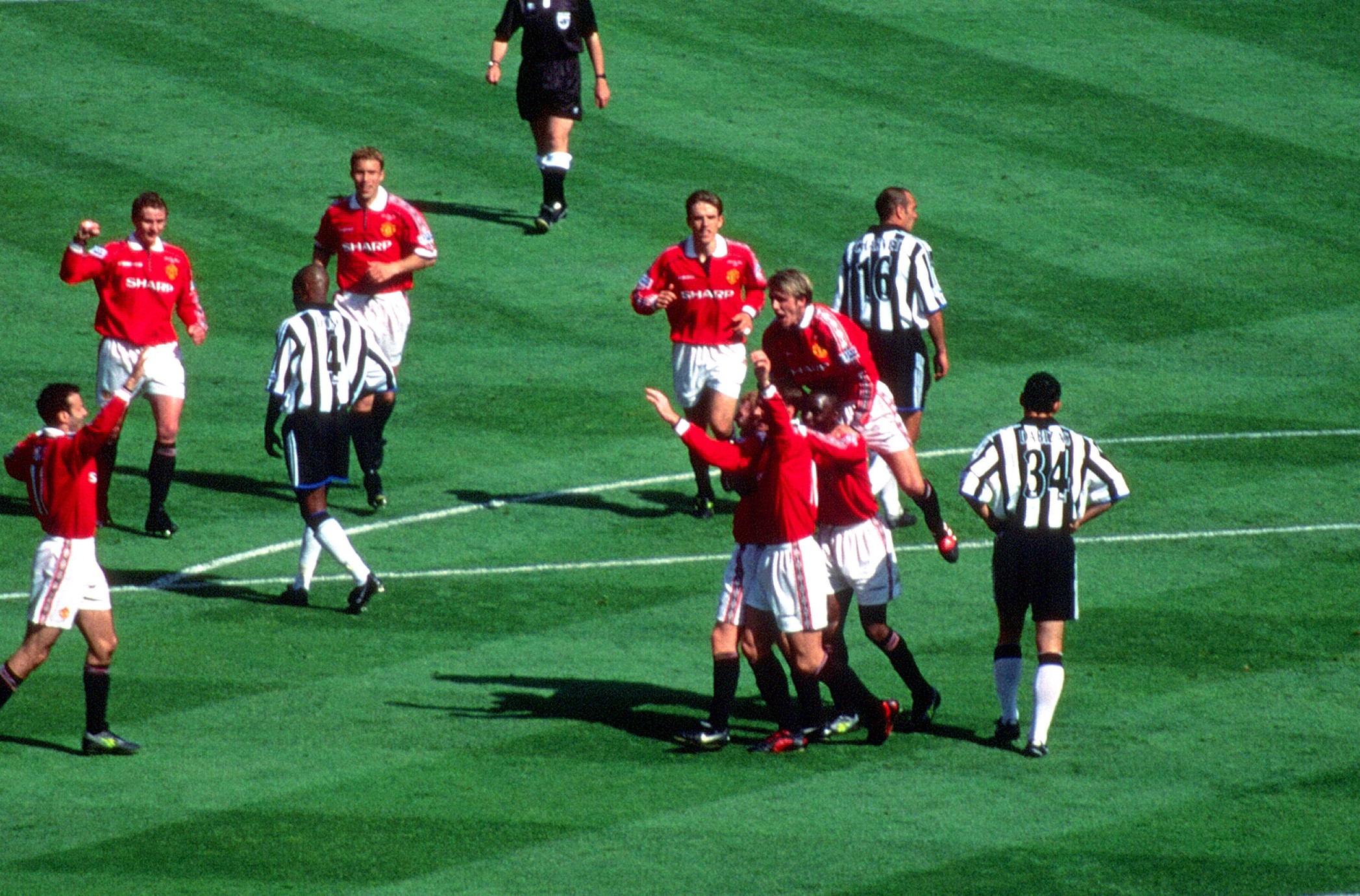
Manchester United players celebrate their second goal by Scholes in the 1999 FA Cup final at Wembley Stadium

Scholes was a member of the Manchester United youth team that reached the final of the FA Youth Cup in the 1992–93 season, alongside Phil Neville. Scholes turned professional on 23 July 1993 but did not make his breakthrough into the senior squad until the 1994–95 season, when he made seventeen league appearances and scored five goals.

His debut came on 21 September 1994, where he scored both goals in a 2–1 victory over Port Vale in the League Cup. His league debut came three days later against Ipswich Town at Portman Road, a game which United lost 3–2 and Scholes scored a consolation goal. He scored two league goals when he came on 10 December when United beat Queens Park Rangers 3–2 at Loftus Road. On 3 January 1995, he got onto the scoresheet at Old Trafford for the first time with the opener in a 2–0 league win over Coventry City. He scored once more that season, in a 3–2 away win over Coventry City on 1 May. Scholes came on as a substitute in the 1995 FA Cup final against Everton, which United lost 1–0.

In the 1995–96 season, after Mark Hughes moved to Chelsea, Scholes had more first-team opportunities, standing in for the suspended Eric Cantona as Andy Cole's strike partner for the first two months of the season. Scholes scored 14 goals in all competitions as United became the first English team to win the double twice. He picked up another Premier League medal in the 1996–97 season.

After Roy Keane suffered a knee injury in late September 1997 and was ruled out for the rest of the season, Scholes was made a central midfielder in the 1997–98 season. United finished the season without a major trophy, only the second time in the 1990s that this happened.

In the 1998–99 season, Scholes was a key player in Manchester United's Premier League title, FA Cup, and UEFA Champions League treble success. He scored one of Manchester United's two goals against Newcastle in the FA Cup final. He also scored an away goal against Inter Milan in the Champions League quarter-final. He came on as a substitute in the second leg of the semi-final against Juventus as manager Alex Ferguson opted for Nicky Butt in the starting line-up. He picked up a yellow card which ruled him out of the final victory over Bayern Munich through suspension.

==== 1999–2007 ====
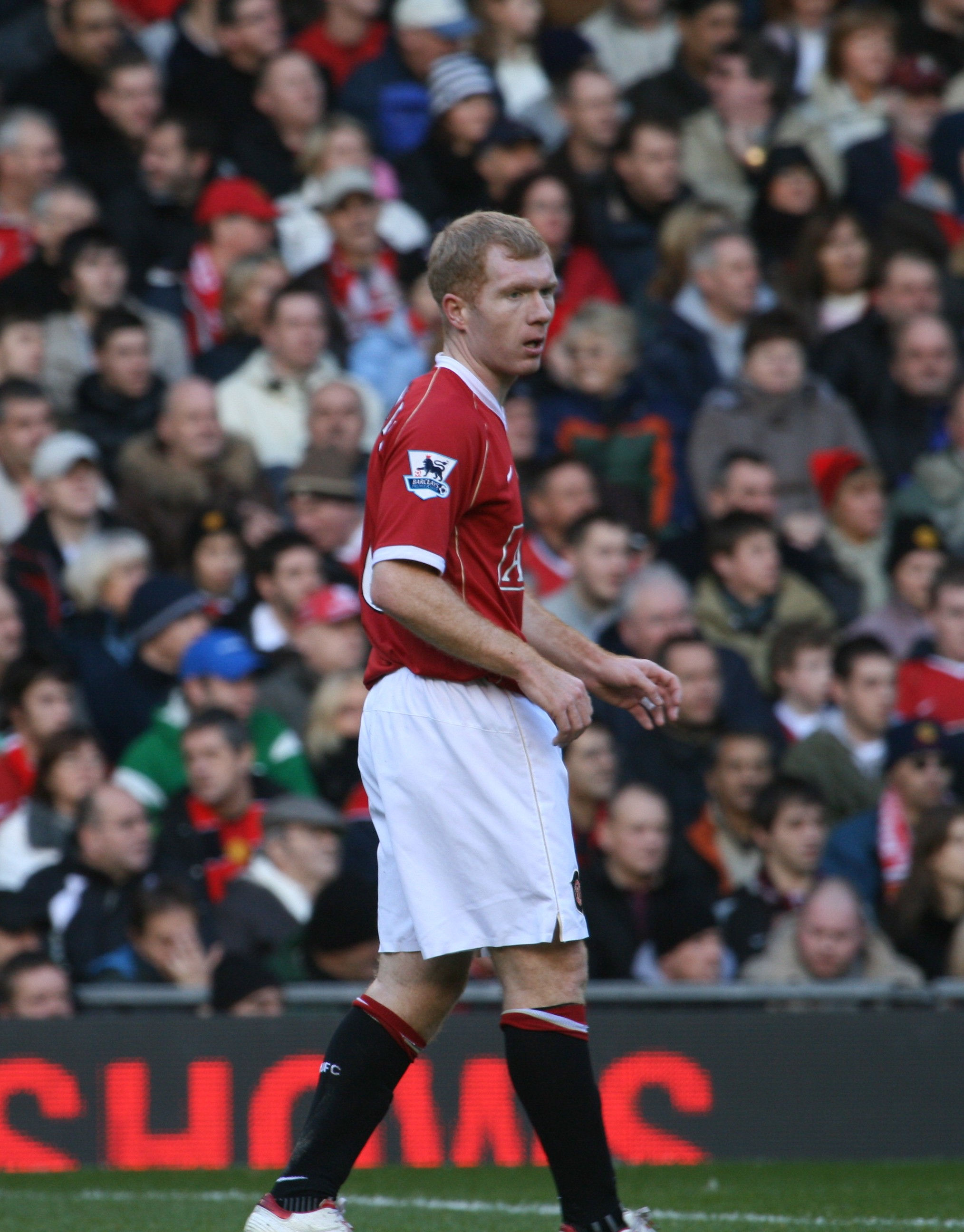
Scholes playing for Manchester United in 2006

During the 1999–2000 season, Scholes scored one of the finest goals of his career against Bradford City on 25 March 2000. David Beckham took a corner directly to Scholes, who was standing on the edge of the area, who volleyed it in over Dwight Yorke, who was forced to duck. A week later, Scholes scored the first hat-trick of his United career against West Ham United in a 7–1 victory that put United ten points clear.

During the 2001–02 transfer window, United completed the signing of Argentine international Juan Sebastián Verón. To accommodate Scholes and Verón, Ferguson persisted with the 4–4–1–1 formation, with Scholes playing at the withdrawn striker role behind Ruud van Nistelrooy, as Roy Keane and Verón played in central midfield. In European away fixtures, Scholes was often played in central midfield alongside Verón as Keane anchored.

Scholes netted a career-high 20 goals in all competitions in the 2002–03 season, including a hat-trick in a 6–2 win against Newcastle. a number that dipped to fourteen the next year. This was despite a career-best four FA Cup goals, in comparison to his total of five FA Cup goals scored in his first nine seasons.

Scholes scored the winning goal in the 2003–04 FA Cup semi-final against Arsenal, and played in the final which United won 3–0 against Millwall, his last FA Cup medal. He also played in the 2005 FA Cup final, but saw his penalty kick saved by Jens Lehmann as they lost to Arsenal in a penalty shoot-out.

Scholes was ruled out for the second half of the 2005–06 season with blurred vision. The cause of this was initially uncertain, sparking fears that it could end his career. He overcame this problem through the beginning of the year and he appeared in United's final game of the season against Charlton Athletic.

Scholes and Wayne Rooney were sent off on 4 August 2006 in a pre-season friendly against Porto in the Netherlands. England's Football Association suspended the pair for three games, which United appealed due to the non-competitive nature of the fixture; Ferguson conceded that Scholes should have been sent off for his tackle from behind on Ricardo Quaresma, while defending Rooney. An independent panel upheld the suspensions of both players.

On 22 October 2006, in the 2–0 victory over Liverpool, Scholes became the ninth United player to play in 500 matches, joining Bobby Charlton, Bill Foulkes and Ryan Giggs. Scholes experienced one of his finest seasons in 2006–07, and was included in the PFA Team of the Year, and was shortlisted for the PFA Players' Player of the Year. One of his finest performances of the season came in a 4–1 win against Blackburn Rovers, where United were 1–0 down but Scholes "got hold of the game by the scruff of the neck" and scored the equalising goal. On 3 March 2007, in a 1–0 victory over Liverpool at Anfield, Scholes was dismissed for swinging an arm at Xabi Alonso; John O'Shea scored the winning goal in injury time. It marked his first league sending off since April 2005. A month later, he was sent off in the first leg of United's Champions League quarter-final at Roma.

==== 2007–2011 ====
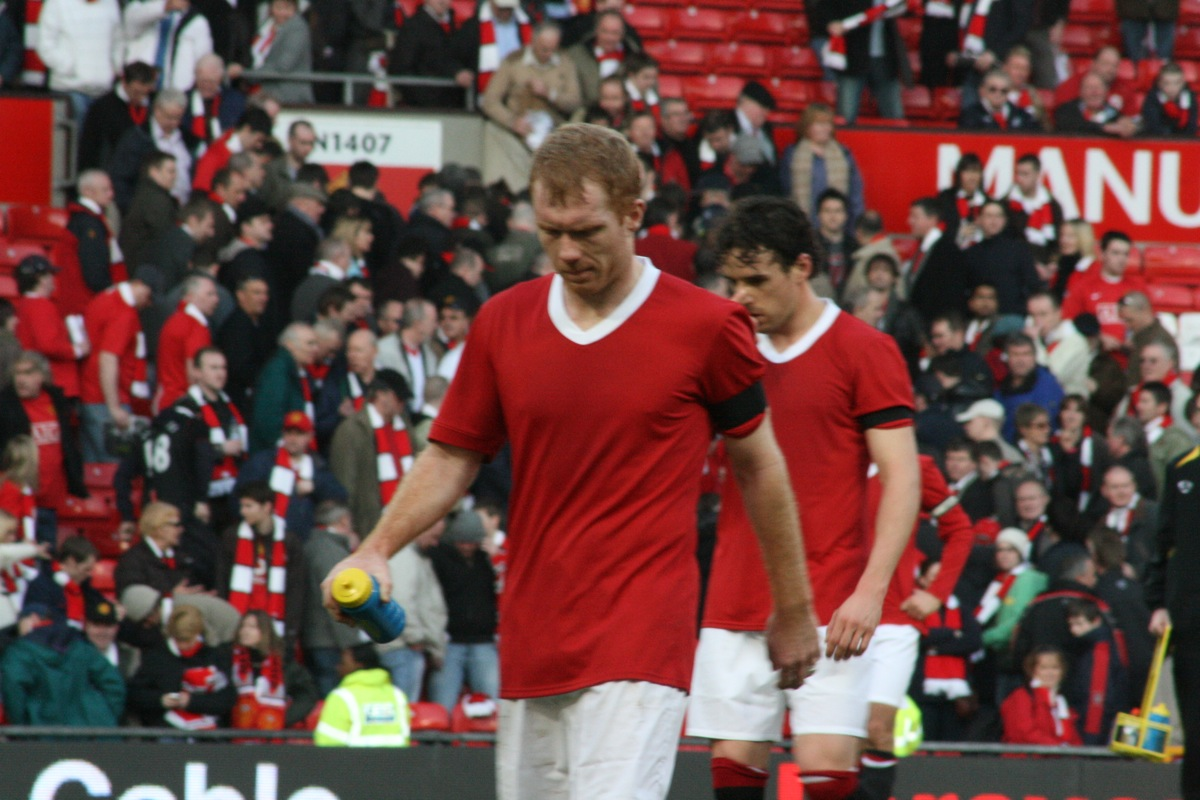
Scholes (left) playing for Manchester United in 2008

Scholes suffered knee ligament damage during a training session the night before United's Champions League Group F match with Dynamo Kyiv on 23 October 2007, and was out of action until the end of January 2008. He returned as a substitute in United's 3–1 win over Tottenham Hotspur in the fourth round of the FA Cup. On 23 April 2008, Scholes made his 100th Champions League appearance in a 0–0 draw away to Barcelona in the semi-final first leg, and scored the only goal from 25 yards in a 1–0 victory in the second leg that sent United into the final. During the final against Chelsea, he suffered an injury and received a yellow card after a clash with Claude Makélélé. He was substituted in the 87th minute and did not take part in the penalty shoot-out, which United won 6–5 after drawing 1–1 after extra time. In the 2008 UEFA Super Cup against Zenit Saint Petersburg, Scholes was sent off after he received a second yellow card for a deliberate handball.

Scholes was inducted into the English Football Hall of Fame in September 2008. On 22 April 2009, he made his 600th appearance for United in a 2–0 win over Portsmouth.

On 16 February 2010, Scholes scored his third Champions League goal of the season against AC Milan in a 3–2 win, which was also United's first away goal against Milan. This gave United their first away win over Milan and also made Scholes the first player to score against both Inter Milan and AC Milan at the San Siro in the Champions League. The goal against Milan was Scholes' 25th Champions League goal in total, and, with 25 goals to his name, Scholes is the highest goal-scoring central midfielder in Champions League history.

On 6 March 2010, Scholes became the 19th player in Premier League history to score 100 goals, and also the third United player after Ryan Giggs and Wayne Rooney to do so, in the 2009–10 Premier League season, with the only goal in a 1–0 away win over Wolverhampton Wanderers. On 16 April 2010, Scholes signed a new one-year contract with United, keeping him at the club until the end of the 2010–11 season.

Scholes began the 2010–11 season strongly, displaying man of the match performances against Chelsea in the 2010 Community Shield on 8 August and eight days later in the opening fixture of the new league campaign against Newcastle United as he assisted two goals in a 3–0 home victory. Scholes scored his 150th goal for United in a 2–2 away draw against Fulham on 22 August, and was also awarded the Premier League Player of the Month for August 2010. In April 2011, Scholes was sent off for a high challenge on Pablo Zabaleta in the FA Cup semi-final against Manchester City, which United went on to lose 1–0.

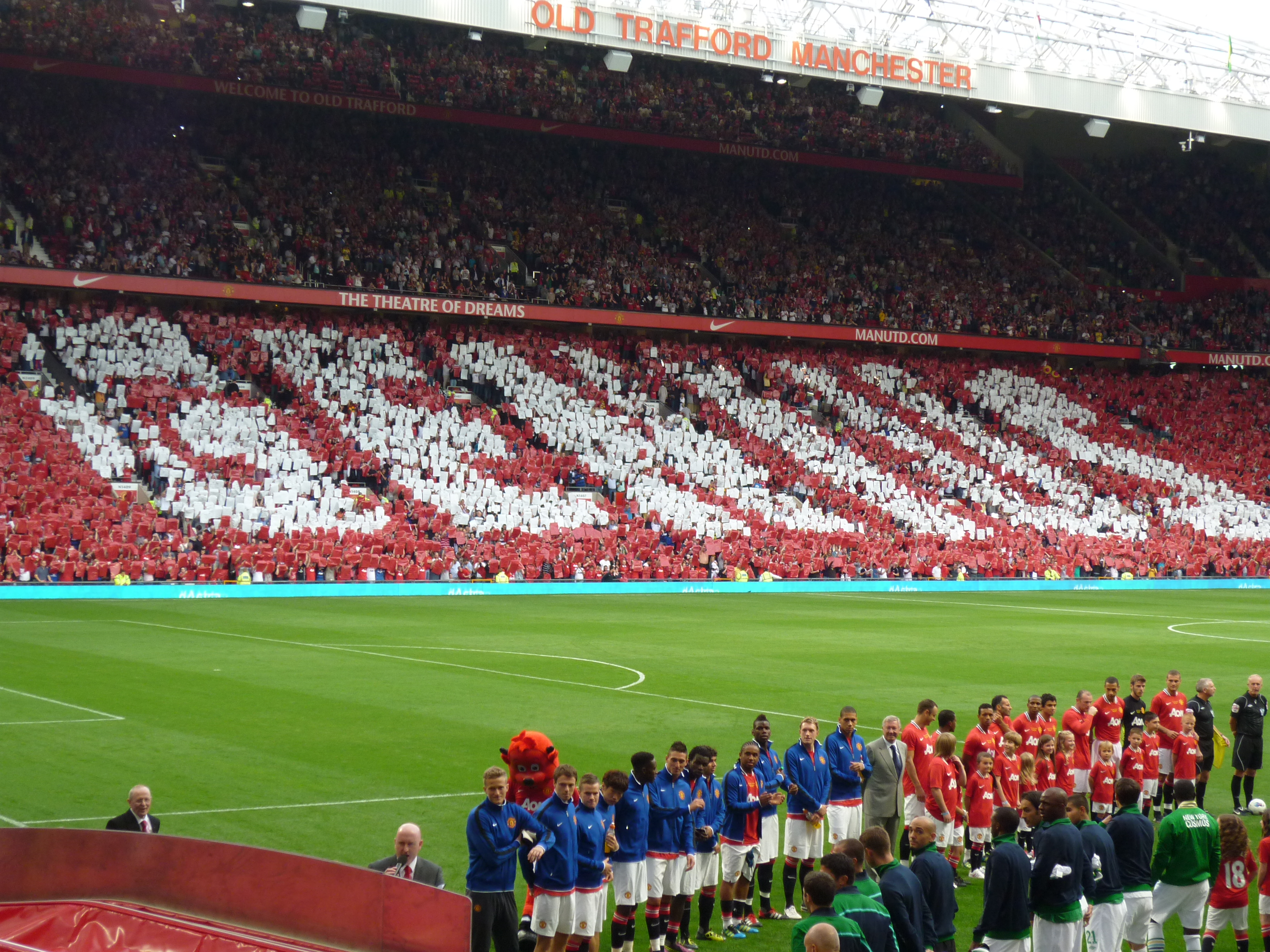
Scholes' testimonial match at Old Trafford in 2011

On 28 May 2011, Scholes came on as a substitute during United's 3–1 defeat to Barcelona in the Champions League final. Three days later, he announced his retirement with immediate effect, and joined the club's coaching staff. On 5 August, United held a testimonial match to honour his 17 years of service to the club. The match was played at Old Trafford against New York Cosmos. United won the match 6–0, with Scholes opening the scoring with a shot from 25 yards, in front of a sell out 74,731 crowd.

==== 2012–2013 ====
Having been training with United's reserve team, Scholes' desire to play football returned and he approached Alex Ferguson and assistant manager Mike Phelan with a view to coming out of retirement, possibly for another club if they declined to have him back at United. However, the club had been going through an injury crisis in midfield, and, on 8 January 2012, Scholes made his comeback as a substitute in a 3–2 win over neighbours Manchester City in the 2011–12 FA Cup.

Scholes made his first start in the next game against Bolton Wanderers, where he scored his first goal since returning in a 3–0 victory at Old Trafford, converting a Wayne Rooney pass. This meant he had scored at least one goal in every season in the Premier League since 1994–95. He scored his second goal since coming back in a 2–1 away win against Norwich City on 26 February, heading home a cross from Nani. On 8 April, he scored in a 2–0 win against Queens Park Rangers at Old Trafford, helping United to go eight points clear of rivals Manchester City in the Premier League.

On 30 May, Scholes signed a one-year extension with Manchester United, keeping him at the club until summer 2013. He marked his 700th appearance for Manchester United by scoring in a 4–0 win at home to Wigan Athletic on 15 September 2012. This goal meant that he had scored in his 19th consecutive Premier League season, a feat only surpassed by teammate Ryan Giggs, who holds the record of 21 consecutive seasons.

On 11 May 2013, Scholes announced that he would make his second and final retirement from football at the end of the season. Scholes made his 499th and final professional league appearance on 19 May 2013 against West Bromwich Albion as a substitute. During the game, Scholes earned his 97th Premier League yellow card, at the time the third most in the history of the Premier League behind Lee Bowyer (102) and Kevin Davies (101). Scholes finished his career with 25 trophies, including 11 Premier League titles (more than any other English player), three FA Cups and two UEFA Champions League titles.

=== Royston Town ===
In August 2018, Scholes briefly came out of retirement from football at the age of 43 and played a match for his son Arron's team, Royston Town of the Manchester Football League Premier Division, against Stockport Georgians. Royston lost the fixture 1–0. Scholes made two further appearances for Royston Town, once against Poulton in the Lancashire FA Amateur Shield, and in the reverse league fixture against Stockport Georgians.

== International career ==
Scholes made four appearances for the England national under-18 team, all of which came in 1993, scoring one goal. He scored from a penalty kick on his debut for the team on 30 March 1993 in a 4–2 win over Denmark in a friendly at the Victoria Ground. He was part of the England team that won the 1993 UEFA European Under-18 Championship, which was hosted in England. Scholes played in three of England's four matches at the tournament, including the final on 25 July in which England beat Turkey 1–0 at the City Ground.

Scholes made his debut for the England senior team on 24 May 1997 as a 63rd-minute substitute against South Africa in a 2–1 win at Old Trafford in a friendly. He scored his first goal for England on his full debut on his second appearance, in a 2–0 win over Italy on 4 June at the Stade de la Beaujoire in the 1997 Tournoi de France. He was included in the England squad for the 1998 FIFA World Cup. England were grouped with Colombia, Tunisia and Romania. During England's first World Cup group match against Tunisia, Scholes sealed a 2–0 victory with a goal late in the game.

His international career continued after England's elimination from the World Cup by Argentina after a penalty shoot-out in the first knock-out round. On 27 March 1999, Scholes managed a hat-trick for England in a game against Poland. In addition, Scholes scored both goals in England's 2–0 win at Hampden Park over Scotland in the UEFA Euro 2000 play-off first leg, sealing a 2–1 aggregate win and qualification for the finals tournament. In a qualifier against Sweden that June, Scholes became the first and last England player to be sent off in an international match at the old Wembley Stadium.

With the turn of the century, Scholes became a prominent player in England's midfield, becoming a first-choice selection for the 2002 World Cup. Immediately prior to Euro 2004, however, Scholes was played out of position on the left midfield to accommodate the pairing of Steven Gerrard and Frank Lampard in central midfield, starting on the left for the last five matches of his international career. Scholes announced his retirement from international football in August 2004, citing his family life and his club career with Manchester United as being more important.

Following the departure of England manager Sven-Göran Eriksson in 2006, there was speculation regarding Scholes making himself available for international duty again under new manager Steve McClaren. In October 2006, McClaren said that he had personally asked Scholes twice to rejoin England, but Scholes declined. In May 2010, McClaren's successor Fabio Capello approached Scholes about a return to international football in the run-up to the 2010 World Cup, but Scholes again rejected the offer, saying he would prefer to spend time with his family. On 7 June 2010, Scholes stated that if Capello had given him more time and asked earlier, he would have probably taken the opportunity. On 27 July, Scholes expressed his disappointment in not taking the opportunity to play at another World Cup, saying he may have made a mistake.

== Player profile ==
=== Style of play ===
Scholes was highly regarded for his technical skills, and renowned for his accurate passing, intelligent movement and powerful shooting from long range. Though he played mostly as a striker in his youth and early professional career, Scholes matured into a well-rounded, tenacious, and versatile playmaker capable of playing in any midfield position, often alternating between defensive, offensive, wide and playmaking roles, due to his stamina, vision, work-rate, and positional sense. Scholes was renowned for his late attacking runs and ability to combine with teammates, as well as an excellent capacity to read the game and control the tempo of play, which enabled him to function in a deep-seated creative role as well as in a box-to-box role in the centre of the pitch. He played in the centre for much of the earlier part of his career, while he was instead deployed in a deeper role in the later part of his career. Scholes possessed an extraordinary range of passing and frequently initiated dangerous attacking plays after winning back possession.

In an interview with FourFourTwo, Scholes admitted to not being blessed with notable pace or dribbling skills, and attributed his calmness and ability to retain possession under pressure to having a sharp brain, excellent awareness, and good link-up play. He was also used in a more advanced creative role on occasion, as a deep-lying forward behind an out-and-out striker. At international level, he was also occasionally used out of position on the left flank.

Scholes received criticism for his discipline, particularly regarding his tackling, which was questioned as frequently inept by multiple pundits, fans and Scholes himself. In addition, the potential for malicious intent in some of his tackles was raised, and it has been suggested that he escaped greater censure due to the admiration that many have for the rest of his game. Arsenal manager Arsène Wenger criticised Scholes' tackling, stating, "For me he was not a fair player. There's a little bit of a darker side in him, sometimes, that I did not like. I respect him highly as a quality player but I did not like some things he did on the football pitch." Scholes said in an interview that he was not a bad tackler, but that, "If someone got me early in the game, it was always in the back of my mind that I needed to get them back", and suggested that the bookings he received towards the end of his career were influenced by his reputation.

=== Reception ===
Many of Scholes' peers, including Ronaldinho, Andrés Iniesta, Luís Figo, Edgar Davids, Arjen Robben, Patrick Vieira, Juan Sebastián Verón, Deco and Xabi Alonso, have spoken about their admiration for his talent. Some of his former teammates, including Cristiano Ronaldo, Wayne Rooney and Alan Shearer, have rated him as the best player they have played with. His former managers, Glenn Hoddle and Sven-Göran Eriksson, have named him as the best or most talented player they coached.

In November 2004, when former Brazil midfielder and captain Sócrates was asked for his views on the English game he replied, "...I think of Paul Scholes. He's good enough to play for Brazil. I love to watch Scholes, to see him pass..." Bobby Charlton commented, "Paul is always so in control and pin-point accurate with his passing – a beautiful player to watch."

When former Real Madrid midfielder and France captain Zinedine Zidane was asked who was his toughest opponent, he replied, "Scholes of Manchester. He is the complete midfielder. Scholes is undoubtedly the greatest midfielder of his generation." In 2009, Barcelona forward and France captain, and former Arsenal captain Thierry Henry said, "Without any doubt the best player in the Premiership has to be Paul Scholes. He knows how to do everything, and he is the one who directs the way his team plays. On top of that, he has indestructible mental strength, and he is a genuine competitor."

In February 2011, Barcelona and Spain midfielder Xavi rated him as the best player in his position in the past two decades commenting, "A role model. For me – and I really mean this – he's the best central midfielder I've seen in the last 15, 20 years... He's spectacular, he has it all: the last pass, goals, he's strong, he doesn't lose the ball, vision. If he'd been Spanish he might have been rated more highly." Former Juventus midfielder and Italy captain Andrea Pirlo selected him as the only English player in his dream Champions League XI and commented, "You could see every pass, every decision, was based on his intelligence and understanding."

In February 2011, Manchester United teammate Ryan Giggs hailed him Manchester United's greatest ever player and commented, "The way he can control the tempo of games, and his range of passing, are both incredible." Former Manchester United teammate Carlos Tevez described Scholes as the best passer whom he had ever played alongside, and former England and United striker Michael Owen remarked "Nobody on this planet had a range of passing like Paul Scholes." Former Denmark goalkeeper and another former United teammate Peter Schmeichel commented, "His reading of the game is unsurpassed."

In May 2008, Italy and former Juventus manager Marcello Lippi commented, "he combines great talent and technical ability with mobility, determination and a superb shot. He is an all-round midfielder who possesses character and quality in abundance." In August 2010, BBC football pundit and former Liverpool defender Alan Hansen described him as "one of the top three to five players to have ever played in the Premier League", and commented, "His passing, movement and technique set examples to everyone." In May 2011, Barcelona manager Pep Guardiola described him as "the best midfielder of his generation". In August 2017, England manager Gareth Southgate said, "You've got very good players and then there are top players. In my time in the England setup, Paul Gascoigne, Paul Scholes and [Wayne] Rooney just had that little bit more than all the others. And we are talking high‑level people there, players like Steven Gerrard, Frank Lampard and David Beckham."

The former head of Manchester United's youth team Eric Harrison commented, "his positional sense is second to none and he knows what's around him before he receives the ball. Paul has no great pace or power, but he makes up for that with his reading of the game, his awareness and his superb touch." Former Manchester United manager Alex Ferguson called him "one of the greatest football brains Manchester United has ever had".

Many, including Scholes' national teammates, have said that he was one of the few English players capable of "pulling the strings" in midfield, controlling the tempo, reading and dictating the flow of the game, and distributing the play where England often have been criticised for being nervous on the ball and giving away possession.

== Football ownership and coaching career ==
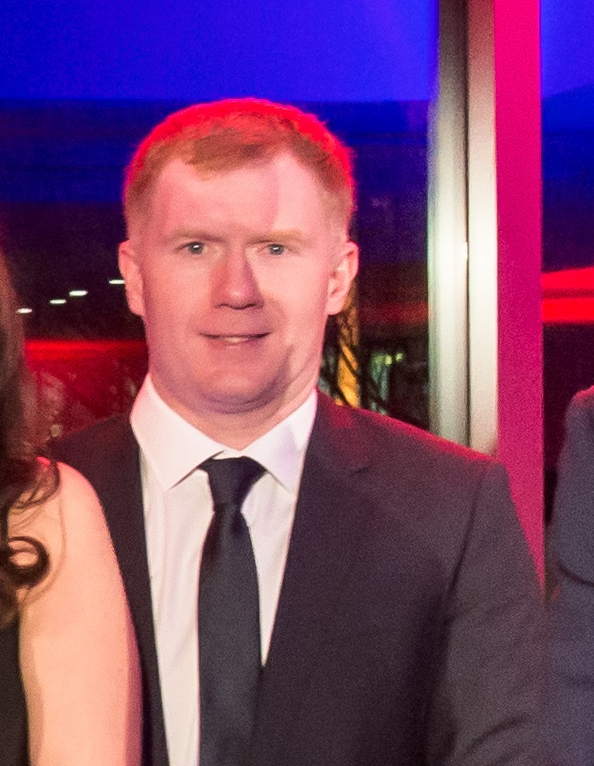
Scholes in 2015

In 2014, it was announced that Scholes, along with fellow Manchester United legends Gary Neville, Ryan Giggs, Nicky Butt, and Phil Neville, had agreed a deal to purchase Salford City ahead of the 2014–15 season. with plans to get the club to the Football League. The group announced they would take part in a special friendly, with Salford facing a Class of '92 team. On 22 September, the group agreed to sell a 50% stake in the club to billionaire Peter Lim.

Having previously informally helped out Nicky Butt with the Manchester United under-19 team during the first half of the 2013–14 season, Scholes agreed to join the United first-team coaching staff on a temporary basis after the dismissal of David Moyes until the end of the season as a favour to friend and former teammate Ryan Giggs, following the latter's appointment as interim player-manager on 23 April 2014.

In January 2015, Scholes and Phil Neville were caretaker managers of Salford for a 2–1 win over Kendal Town, between the dismissal of Phil Power and appointment of Anthony Johnson and Bernard Morley.

On 19 November 2017, Scholes and his old teammate, Ryan Giggs, were invited to join in training works for PVF Football Academy in Vietnam. With Ryan Giggs, who was chosen to be a development director, Scholes worked as a technical advisor.

On 11 February 2019, Scholes was appointed as manager of League Two club Oldham Athletic, having been cleared to take the position by the English Football League in light of his ownership of Salford City. On 14 March, Scholes resigned as manager, having won one of his seven games in charge, following interference from club owner Abdallah Lemsagam in first-team affairs.

On 12 October 2020, Scholes was appointed interim head coach of Salford City, following the departure of Graham Alexander. Scholes' first game in charge was a 1–0 defeat to Port Vale on 17 October, and he quickly ruled out taking the position on a permanent basis, citing the need for a more experienced manager. His first win came three days later with a 3–0 win against struggling Southend United. Scholes left the role on 4 November, following the permanent appointment of Richie Wellens to the post.

== Outside football ==
=== Media career ===
In July 2014, Scholes became a pundit after signing a four-year deal with BT Sport. He would also be featuring on ITV's coverage of Champions League and England internationals. Scholes previously made an appearance for Sky Sports as a pundit during the 2013–14 season. In August, he agreed to become a columnist for The Independent. Scholes has been praised for his passionate and no nonsense style of punditry.

In October 2025, Scholes announced that he had left commentary, in order to accommodate the need for routine for his 20-year-old autistic son.

=== Endorsements ===
Scholes featured in EA Sports' FIFA video game series. He was on the cover for the international edition of FIFA 2001, and was named in the Ultimate Team Legends for FIFA 17.

Scholes has endorsed sportswear company Nike and appeared in Nike commercials. In a global Nike advertising campaign in the run-up to the 2002 World Cup in Korea and Japan, he starred in a "Secret Tournament" commercial (branded "Scorpion KO") directed by Terry Gilliam, appearing alongside football players such as Thierry Henry, Ronaldo, Edgar Davids, Fabio Cannavaro, Francesco Totti, Ronaldinho, Luís Figo and Hidetoshi Nakata, with former player Eric Cantona the tournament "referee".

=== University Academy 92 ===
Along with other United players who won the 1992 FA Youth Cup, Scholes has proposed a university in Greater Manchester, named University Academy 92, which would offer "broader courses than traditional degrees" and attract students who "otherwise might not go on to higher education".

== Personal life ==
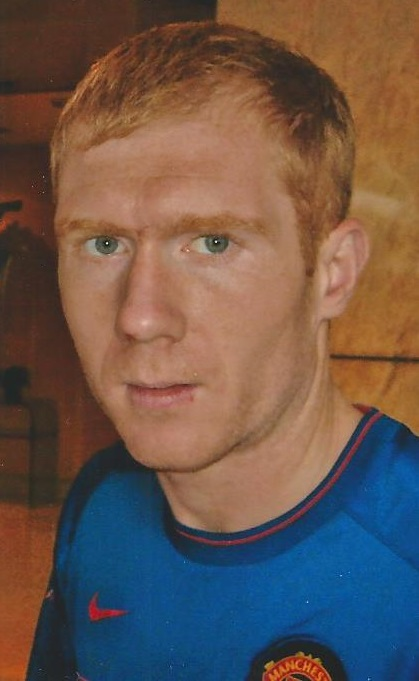
Scholes in 2008

Scholes is asthmatic, and suffered from Osgood–Schlatter disease (a knee condition that affects young athletes). He married his childhood sweetheart, Claire (née Froggatt), in Wrexham, Wales, in February 1999. They live in the village of Grasscroft in Greater Manchester, and have a daughter and two sons, the younger of whom has autism. His daughter Alicia Scholes is Netball Superleague player and member of the England national netball team. In 2020, Scholes and his wife separated, and shared custody of their autistic son.

His off-field personality is said by some to be in stark contrast to the attitude of the stereotypical professional footballer. In an interview given before Euro 2004, Scholes described his ideal day as "train in the morning, pick up my children from school, play with them, have tea, put them to bed and then watch a bit of TV".

Roy Keane once highlighted that Scholes did not like the "celebrity bullshit" side of professional sports. With regard to his shunning of celebrity, and instead keeping to his intention to solely focus on doing his job ("a professional footballer"), Keane applauded Scholes after his retirement.

Scholes is known to enjoy betting on football. In June 2019, he was fined and warned over his future conduct by The Football Association (FA) after placing bets worth £26,159 on matches during his time as a director of Salford City. At a tribunal, he was found to have placed 140 bets over three and a half years, in contravention of the FA's gambling rules. The FA fined Scholes £8,000 and asked him to contribute to the costs of the tribunal.

== Career statistics ==
=== Club ===
Appearances and goals by club, season and competition
Club	Season	League			FA Cup		League Cup		Europe		Other		Total	
Club	Season	Division	Apps	Goals	Apps	Goals	Apps	Goals	Apps	Goals	Apps	Goals	Apps	Goals
Manchester United	1994–95	Premier League	17	5	3	0	3	2	2 (Note: Appearances in UEFA Champions League)	0	0	0	25	7
Manchester United	1995–96	Premier League	26	10	2	1	1	2	2 (Note: Appearances in UEFA Cup)	1	—		31	14
Manchester United	1996–97	Premier League	24	3	2	2	2	1	4	0	1 (Note: Appearance in FA Charity Shield)	0	33	6
Manchester United	1997–98	Premier League	31	8	2	0	1	0	7	2	1	0	42	10
Manchester United	1998–99	Premier League	31	6	6	1	1	0	12	4	1	0	51	11
Manchester United	1999–2000	Premier League	31	9	—		0	0	11	3	3 (Note: One appearance in FA Charity Shield, one appearance in European Super Cup, one appearance in Intercontinental Cup)	0	45	12
Manchester United	2000–01	Premier League	32	6	0	0	0	0	12	6	1	0	45	12
Manchester United	2001–02	Premier League	35	8	2	0	0	0	13	1	1	0	51	9
Manchester United	2002–03	Premier League	33	14	3	1	6	3	10	2	—		52	20
Manchester United	2003–04	Premier League	28	9	6	4	0	0	5	1	1 (Note: Appearance in FA Community Shield)	0	40	14
Manchester United	2004–05	Premier League	33	9	6	3	2	0	7	0	1	0	49	12
Manchester United	2005–06	Premier League	20	2	0	0	0	0	7	1	—		27	3
Manchester United	2006–07	Premier League	30	6	4	0	0	0	11	1	—		45	7
Manchester United	2007–08	Premier League	24	1	3	0	0	0	7	1	0	0	34	2
Manchester United	2008–09	Premier League	21	2	2	1	3	0	6	0	3 (Note: One appearance in FA Community Shield, one appearance in UEFA Super Cup, one appearance in FIFA Club World Cup)	0	35	3
Manchester United	2009–10	Premier League	28	3	0	0	2	1	7	3	1	0	38	7
Manchester United	2010–11	Premier League	22	1	3	0	0	0	7	0	1	0	33	1
Manchester United	2011–12	Premier League	17	4	2	0	0	0	2 (Note: Appearances in UEFA Europa League)	0	0	0	21	4
Manchester United	2012–13	Premier League	16	1	3	0	0	0	2	0	—		21	1
Manchester United	Total		499	107	49	13	21	9	134	26	15	0	718	155
Royton Town	2018–19	Manchester Football League; Premier Division	2	0	0	0	—		—		1 (Note: Appearance in Lancashire FA Amateur Shield)	0	3	0
Career total			501	107	49	13	21	9	134	26	16	0	721	155

=== International ===
Appearances and goals by national team and year
National team	Year	Apps	Goals
England	1997	5	3
England	1998	9	1
England	1999	6	5
England	2000	10	1
England	2001	10	3
England	2002	11	0
England	2003	8	0
England	2004	7	1
Total		66	14

England score listed first, score column indicates score after each Scholes goal

List of international goals scored by Paul Scholes
No.	Date	Venue	Cap	Opponent	Score	Result	Competition	Ref.
1	4 June 1997	Stade de la Beaujoire, Nantes, France	2	Italy	2–0	2–0	1997 Tournoi de France	
2	10 September 1997	Wembley Stadium, London, England	4	Moldova	1–0	4–0	1998 FIFA World Cup qualification	
3	15 November 1997	Wembley Stadium, London, England	5	Cameroon	1–0	2–0	Friendly	
4	15 June 1998	Stade Vélodrome, Marseille, France	8	Tunisia	2–0	2–0	1998 FIFA World Cup	
5	27 March 1999	Wembley Stadium, London, England	16	Poland	1–0	3–1	UEFA Euro 2000 qualifying	
6	27 March 1999	Wembley Stadium, London, England	16	Poland	2–0	3–1	UEFA Euro 2000 qualifying	
7	27 March 1999	Wembley Stadium, London, England	16	Poland	3–1	3–1	UEFA Euro 2000 qualifying	
8	13 November 1999	Hampden Park, Glasgow, Scotland	19	Scotland	1–0	2–0	UEFA Euro 2000 qualifying	
9	13 November 1999	Hampden Park, Glasgow, Scotland	19	Scotland	2–0	2–0	UEFA Euro 2000 qualifying	
10	12 June 2000	Philips Stadion, Eindhoven, Netherlands	25	Portugal	1–0	2–3	UEFA Euro 2000	
11	28 March 2001	Qemal Stafa Stadium, Tirana, Albania	33	Albania	2–0	3–1	2002 FIFA World Cup qualification	
12	25 May 2001	Pride Park Stadium, Derby, England	34	Mexico	1–0	4–0	Friendly	
13	6 June 2001	Olympic Stadium, Athens, Greece	35	Greece	1–0	2–0	2002 FIFA World Cup qualification	
14	21 June 2004	Estádio da Luz, Lisbon, Portugal	65	Croatia	1–1	4–2	UEFA Euro 2004	

== Managerial statistics ==
As of 4 November 2020

Managerial record by team and tenure
Team	From	To	Record					Ref.
Team	From	To	P	W	D	L	Win %	Ref.
Salford City (caretaker)	3 January 2015	3 January 2015	1	1	0	0	100.0	
Oldham Athletic	11 February 2019	14 March 2019	7	1	3	3	14.3	
Salford City (interim)	12 October 2020	4 November 2020	5	2	1	2	40.0	
Career total			13	4	4	5	30.8	

== Honours ==
Manchester United

- Premier League: 1995–96, 1996–97, 1998–99, 1999–2000, 2000–01, 2002–03, 2006–07, 2007–08, 2008–09, 2010–11, 2012–13
- FA Cup: 1995–96, 1998–99, 2003–04; runner-up: 1994–95, 2004–05, 2006–07
- Football League Cup: 2008–09, 2009–10; runner-up: 2002–03
- FA Charity Shield/FA Community Shield: 1996, 1997, 2003, 2008, 2010
- UEFA Champions League: 1998–99, 2007–08; runner-up: 2008–09, 2010–11
- Intercontinental Cup: 1999
- FIFA Club World Cup: 2008

England U18

- UEFA European Under-18 Championship: 1993

Individual

- Jimmy Murphy Young Player of the Year: 1992–93
- Manchester United Goal of the Season: 2006–07
- Premier League Player of the Month: January 2003, December 2003, October 2006, August 2010
- PFA Team of the Year: 2002–03 Premier League, 2006–07 Premier League
- Premier League 10 Seasons Awards Team of the Decade: 1992–93 to 2001–02
- English Football Hall of Fame: 2008
- Premier League 20 Seasons Awards Fantasy Team: 1992–93 to 2011–12
- Premier League Hall of Fame: 2022
- FWA Tribute Award: 2012

== See also ==
- List of footballers with 100 or more UEFA Champions League appearances
- List of one-club men in association football
- List of athletes who came out of retirement
