= The Class of '92 =

- Directed by: Ben Turner; Gabe Turner
- Produced by: Leo Pearlman; F73 Productions
- Starring: David Beckham; Nicky Butt; Ryan Giggs; Gary Neville; Phil Neville; Paul Scholes
- Production companies: Boundless; Fulwell 73
- Distributed by: Universal Pictures
- Release date: 1 December 2013
- Running time: 98 minutes
- Country: United Kingdom
- Language: English

The Class of '92 is a 2013 British documentary film, released on 1 December 2013. The film centres on the rise of six young Manchester United footballers – David Beckham, Nicky Butt, Ryan Giggs, Gary Neville, Phil Neville and Paul Scholes – and details their careers for Manchester United starting in 1992.

== Synopsis ==
The documentary covers the period from Manchester United's FA Youth Cup win in 1992 to their Champions League triumph in 1999, which rounded off the Treble-winning 1998–99 season. The film cuts the narrative with the social and cultural changes taking place in Great Britain at the time.

The film secured full access with all six players and also includes interviews with former footballers Zinedine Zidane and Eric Cantona, former Manchester United youth coach Eric Harrison, film maker Danny Boyle, former Prime Minister Tony Blair and The Stone Roses bassist Mani.

== Reception ==
The documentary was generally met with positive reviews. Critics praised the film for its focus on the players' friendship over the years outside of football.

== See also ==
- Fergie's Fledglings
- List of association football films
