= Gary Neville =

English footballer (born 1975)

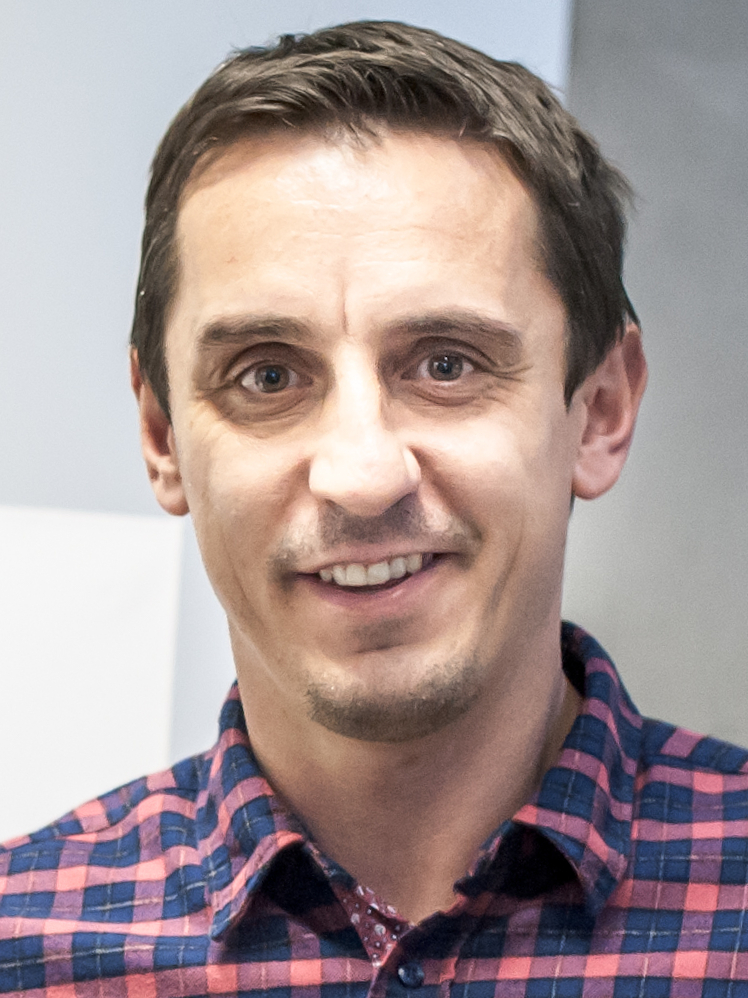
- Neville in 2014

Personal information
- Full name: Gary Alexander Neville
- Date of birth: 18 February 1975 (age 51)
- Place of birth: Bury, Greater Manchester, England
- Height: 5 ft 10 in (1.78 m)
- Position: Right-back

Youth career
- 1991–1992: Manchester United

Senior career*
Years	Team	Apps	(Gls)
1992–2011	Manchester United	400	(5)

International career
1992	England U16	1	(0)
1992–1993	England U18	8	(0)
1995–2007	England	85	(0)

Managerial career
- 2012–2016: England (assistant)
- 2015–2016: Valencia
- * Club domestic league appearances and goals

Gary Alexander Neville (born 18 February 1975) is an English football pundit and former professional player. A right-back, he spent his entire career with Manchester United, serving as captain for five years. He is one of the most decorated English and European footballers of all time, winning 20 trophies, including eight Premier League titles and two UEFA Champions League titles. In 2025, he was inducted into the Premier League Hall of Fame.

Neville made his international debut for England in 1995 and was first-choice right-back for more than 10 years, representing the nation at three European Championships and two FIFA World Cups.

After retiring from football in 2011, Neville went into punditry and was a commentator for Sky Sports until he took the manager position at Valencia in 2015. After being sacked in 2016, he returned as a pundit for Sky Sports that year. He was also an assistant manager for the England national team from 2012 to 2016.

Neville's younger brother Phil Neville is also a former long-serving player for Manchester United, while his sister Tracey Neville is a retired netball international.

== Club career ==
=== 1991–2004 ===
Neville joined Manchester United as an apprentice upon leaving school in 1991, and captained the youth side to FA Youth Cup glory in his first season. He made his senior debut for United on 16 September 1992 in a goalless home draw against Torpedo Moscow in the UEFA Cup. Neville emerged as part of Alex Ferguson's youth-oriented side of the 1990s (nicknamed Fergie's Fledglings, an updated take on the 1950s equivalent Busby Babes) that included his brother Phil, Ryan Giggs, David Beckham, Nicky Butt and Paul Scholes.

In the 1994–95 season, Neville became United's first-choice right-back when Paul Parker was ruled out by injury, and remained so until his retirement, although in his first season as a regular player he often found himself on the sidelines as Denis Irwin was switched to right-back with Lee Sharpe (normally a winger) filling the left-back role.

Neville scored the first goal of his career in 1997 against Middlesbrough in a 3–3 draw, and he went on to score a total of five league goals for United; against Everton in 1999, Aston Villa in a 2–0 victory on 20 January 2001, the sole goal against Leicester City on 13 April 2004, and his final league goal came a week later when he scored the second in a 2–0 victory over Charlton Athletic on 20 April 2004. Neville also scored two goals in the UEFA Champions League, the first on 12 March 2003, when he scored the equaliser in a 1–1 draw with FC Basel, and his seventh and final ever United goal against Lyon on 23 November 2004 in Alex Ferguson's 1,000th game in charge of the club, a 2–1 victory.

Neville formed a successful partnership with Beckham on the right wing, regularly contributing assists.

=== 2005–2011 ===
In January 2005, Neville was critical of Nike for starting anti-racism campaign Stand Up Speak Up, accusing them of only being involved for public relations purposes. Neville made the comments after refusing to wear a training top bearing the logo ahead of a fixture against rivals Arsenal. Writing in The Independent, journalist Sam Wallace said Neville's refusal, as well as that of teammates Scholes and captain Roy Keane, caused friction between the two teams before the match.

Following Keane's departure in November 2005, Neville was appointed the new club captain. In January 2006, his actions were the subject of some controversy after his celebration in front of the visiting Liverpool fans at Old Trafford, when he was seen to run from the halfway line towards the opposing fans to celebrate the 90th minute injury-time winning headed goal by United defender Rio Ferdinand. His actions were criticised by Liverpool and fellow England defender Jamie Carragher, sections of the media and police who blamed him for disturbances between fans after the game. He was subsequently charged with improper conduct by the FA. Neville contested this, asking if it was preferable for players to act like "robots" and show no emotions. He was fined £5,000 and warned about his future conduct.

Neville recovered from an injury suffered against Bolton Wanderers in March 2007 and in his first match back, a reserve game against Everton in January 2008, he scored a rare goal in the 21st minute of the game which helped Manchester United to a 2–2 draw.

On 9 April 2008, Neville made his long-awaited comeback against Roma in the UEFA Champions League quarter-final second leg at Old Trafford, coming on as an 81st-minute substitute for Anderson; Neville was welcomed back to the pitch with a standing ovation, and was promptly given the captain's armband. It was Neville's 99th Champions League appearance. However, he was not selected for the Champions League final squad on 21 May, though he did join in with the post-match celebrations after United won on penalties following a 1–1 draw with Chelsea. Instead, Rio Ferdinand and Giggs lifted the trophy together having shared the captaincy during Neville's absence.

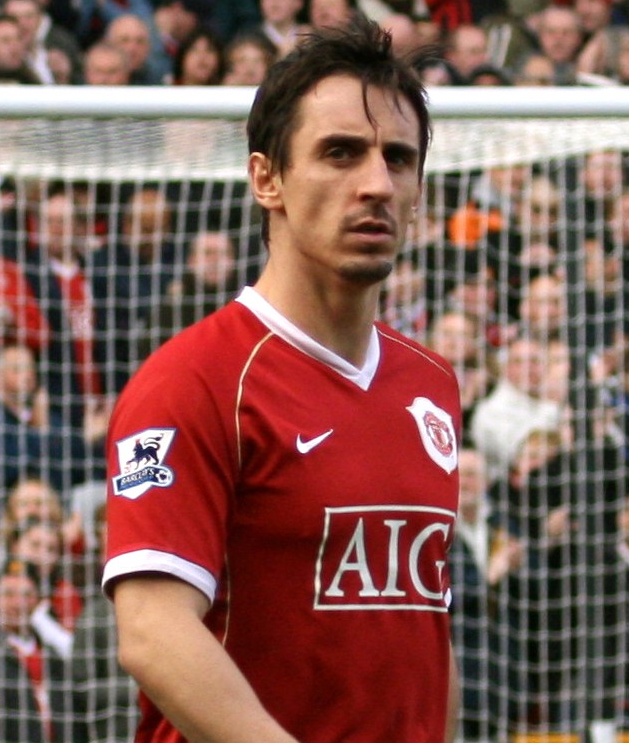
Neville with Manchester United in 2006

Neville started his first game in 17 months when he captained Manchester United for the 2008 FA Community Shield against Portsmouth on 10 August 2008. He made another start against Zenit Saint Petersburg in the UEFA Super Cup, before making his first start at home since his injury against Villarreal in the opening group game of the 2008–09 Champions League. On 21 September 2008, Neville started his first league game in almost 18 months when he played against Chelsea. Neville extended his stay at Old Trafford until June 2010.

On 27 October 2009, Neville was sent off for a tackle on Adam Hammill in United's 2–0 away win against Barnsley in the League Cup Fourth Round. Neville added another medal to his honours list on 28 February 2010 when he came on as a substitute for Rafael in the 2–1 League Cup final win over Aston Villa. He did feature in enough league games to qualify for what would have been his ninth title medal, but United were beaten to the Premier League title by Chelsea who finished ahead of them by a single point. Neville signed a new one-year contract in April 2010.

Having made only sporadic appearances in the last couple of seasons, Neville stepped down as team captain in September 2010 in preference of a more-regular first-team player, usually Rio Ferdinand, Nemanja Vidić or Patrice Evra, although he remained as club captain off the pitch. On 24 October, Neville made his 600th appearance and his penultimate start for United in a 2–1 away victory against Stoke City; after receiving a 34th minute yellow card for a foul against Matthew Etherington, Neville was shown leniency seven minutes later for another reckless tackle on the same player, and was substituted at half-time for Wes Brown.

=== Retirement ===
On 2 February 2011, Neville announced his retirement from football after almost 20 years playing at Manchester United. Neville's final professional appearance was against West Bromwich Albion on New Year's Day 2011, a 2–1 victory at The Hawthorns. Neville later revealed that, during half-time of his last game, he sat on the toilet and knew for certain that it would be his last game. By the time of his retirement, Neville had won eight Premier League titles, three FA Cups, two Champions Leagues, an Intercontinental Cup, a FIFA Club World Cup, and two League Cups. The 2006 League Cup was his first trophy as captain.

His testimonial was played at Old Trafford against Juventus on 24 May 2011. Manchester United's starting line-up included members of the "Class of '92": Neville was joined by Phil Neville, Beckham, Butt, Scholes and Giggs. Juventus won the match 2–1. He made another appearance in Paul Scholes' testimonial at Old Trafford on 5 August 2011, playing for the New York Cosmos in their first fixture since their re-establishment in 2010.

== International career ==
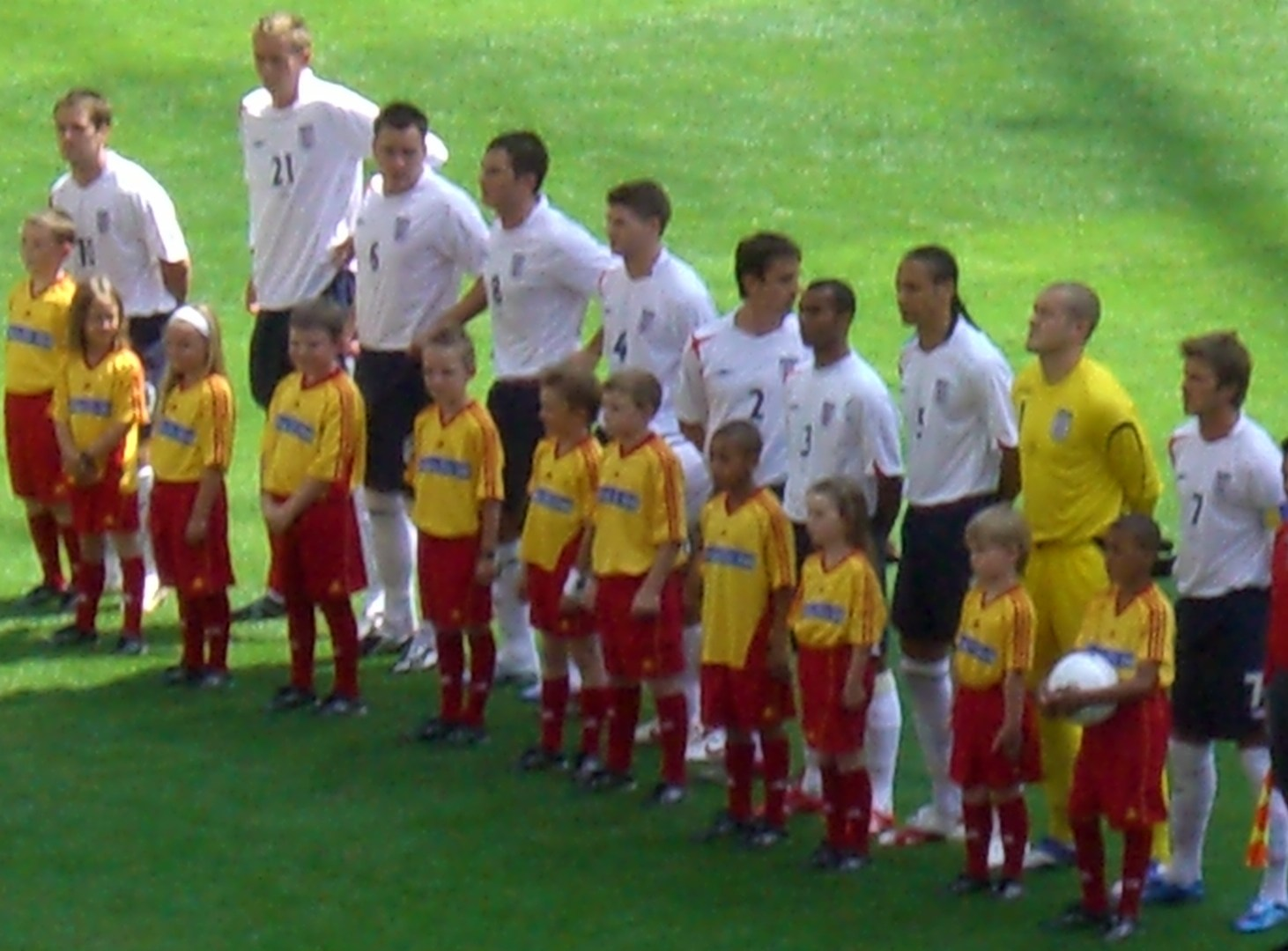
Neville (wearing No.2) lining up for England against Paraguay at the 2006 FIFA World Cup.

Neville made his first appearance for England in 1995 when he was picked by Terry Venables for the friendly against Japan. On 23 May 1996, he was joined in the England team by Phil Neville for a match against China; they had also appeared together in the 1996 FA Cup Final two weeks earlier and thus were the first pair of brothers to play together in an FA Cup-winning side and for England in the same season since Hubert and Francis Heron of Wanderers in 1876, 120 years earlier.

He was subsequently selected at right-back for his country by five different coaches. The form of Manchester City's Micah Richards, Liverpool's Glen Johnson and Neville's Manchester United teammate Wes Brown placed his position in the England team under threat in the latter years of his career.

Neville had been the youngest first-choice player in the England first team during his debut tournament, Euro 96, playing in each game until the semi-final, for which he was suspended after receiving a yellow card in two separate games. England were knocked out by the eventual winners, Germany, in a penalty shootout. In June 1997, he participated in the Tournoi de France, the friendly international football tournament held in France as a warm-up to the 1998 FIFA World Cup. He also played in the 1998 World Cup under the tenure of Glenn Hoddle as manager. As "a bit of a sceptic", Neville did not see Eileen Drewery, the faith healer Hoddle had brought into the England squad. Neville also played at Euro 2000 during the tenure of Kevin Keegan as manager.

A broken foot ruled Neville out of the 2002 World Cup, but he quickly returned to the side after regaining his fitness, and was once again the first-choice right-back by the time of Euro 2004, with the team now being managed by Sven-Göran Eriksson.

Neville missed the latter stages of the qualification campaign for the 2006 World Cup with injury. He returned to the England team in March 2006 for a friendly against Uruguay. Neville was selected for England's 2006 World Cup squad. He played in England's opening Group B game against Paraguay but pulled his calf in training the night before the team's second game and was forced to miss the next three games until playing the full match in England's losing quarter-final against Portugal on 1 July. It was his 81st England cap, bringing him up to ninth in the all-time rankings, ahead of Gary Lineker and teammate Michael Owen, who had briefly drawn level with Neville during the World Cup.

Neville briefly took over the England captaincy during this game after the substitution of David Beckham due to an injury shortly after half-time, despite the previous match's deputy captain John Terry also being on the field.

After the defeat to Portugal, Neville announced that he would continue to be available for selection for his country under new coach Steve McClaren and added that, unlike some former international teammates, he would not ever make the decision to retire from the England set-up, saying, "That decision is not Gary Neville's to make". As one of three club captains (along with Terry and Steven Gerrard) in the first-choice England line-up, he was mentioned as a contender for the England captaincy vacated by Beckham after elimination from the World Cup. However, Terry was given the job and Steven Gerrard made vice-captain.

On 11 October, Neville was involved in a game-changing incident during a Euro 2008 qualifier against Croatia when his straightforward backpass hit a divot and took an unfortunate bounce, causing goalkeeper Paul Robinson to miss his kick, which resulted in the ball ending up in the net. Although Robinson was at the centre of the moment, Neville was officially credited with an own goal, the second of his England career; he scored no goals for England in his 85 international appearances.

On 7 February 2007, Neville won his 85th and final cap in England's 1–0 friendly defeat to Spain at Wembley. His appearance took him to within one cap of equalling Sansom's record for an England full-back, and eighth in the all-time appearances list for his country. However, an ankle injury suffered on 17 March 2007 while playing for Manchester United robbed him of the chance to equal Sansom's record, as he was forced to miss the Euro 2008 qualifiers against Israel and Andorra on 24 March and 28 respectively. Surgery on his ankle ruled him out of two summer matches at the new Wembley Stadium, and then a calf muscle injury delayed his recovery in the autumn. These injury problems together with a perceived decline in ability threatened to put an end to Neville's international playing career. England ultimately failed to qualify for Euro 2008 following a 3–2 home defeat to Croatia on 21 November.

On 24 May 2009, Neville was given a surprise recall to the England squad by Fabio Capello for the World Cup qualifiers against Kazakhstan and Andorra, but did not feature in any of these games.

Neville holds or co-holds a number of England records:

- When he came on as a substitute in a 2–1 friendly defeat against Italy at Leeds in 2002, he earned his 51st cap, breaking the record for a right-back held previously by Phil Neal
- His 11 appearances for England in the European Championship finals (over three tournaments) is a record
- With his brother Phil, the Nevilles hold the record of England's most-capped brothers, with 142 appearances between them. It was Phil's appearance as a substitute against Israel in 2007, a game for which Gary was injured, which broke a record they had jointly held with Jack and Bobby Charlton
- The Nevilles hold outright the record for the most appearances in the same England team by a pair of brothers with 31, although the 31st in 2007 came a whole seven years after the 30th

Neville wrote in his autobiography that, at times, he had reflected on his international career and thought sometimes that it was "a massive waste of time", and that success with United was "always the most important thing".

== Style of play ==
An experienced and dedicated footballer, regarded as one of England's greatest right-backs, and as one of the best Premier League full-backs of his generation, Gary Neville was an aggressive, tenacious, and hard-tackling player, known for his work-rate, professionalism, determination, and consistency as a defender; due to his positional sense, he was also capable of playing as a centre-back on occasion. Under England manager Venables at Euro 96, Neville was also required to play in other different roles depending on the opponent, including as a right-sided wing-back and winger, in addition to his typical roles of right-back and right-sided centre-back. Although he was not the quickest, tallest, strongest, most talented or most technically gifted player, he was a reliable, traditional defensive-minded right-back, known in particular for his tactical intelligence and ability to read the game, as well as his stamina, work-ethic, authoritative presence on the pitch, and leadership, which enabled him to excel in this role; as such, he has been described as an "old-fashioned" defender, due to his combative playing style. During his career, Neville also formed a notable partnership with David Beckham down the right flank at Manchester United: he would often carry up the ball, lay it off to his teammate, and subsequently make overlapping runs to advance into more offensive positions, from which he could receive passes and deliver accurate crosses, providing an additional attacking threat to his team when Beckham was heavily marked. A vocal presence on the pitch and an opinionated dressing room personality, Neville also drew controversy throughout his career for his outspokenness and tendency to be involved in conflicts with opponents. His former manager, Ferguson, once described him as "the best English right-back of his generation".

== Managerial career ==
=== England assistant manager ===
Neville, who holds UEFA Pro Coaching Licences, was appointed to the England senior team coaching staff by newly appointed manager Roy Hodgson on 14 May 2012 along with Ray Lewington and goalkeeping coach Dave Watson, signing a four-year contract with the FA. This saw him on the coaching team for Euro 2012, and was met with the backing of former England and Manchester United teammate David Beckham, who called his appointment a "shrewd move". Neville continued to work as assistant manager of England through the 2014 World Cup and subsequent Euro 2016 qualifying campaign.

=== Valencia ===
Neville was appointed as head coach at Valencia in Spain on 2 December 2015. Neville's brother Phil had previously been caretaker manager and continued to work with his brother at the club; Neville also retained his England assistant coaching role while at Valencia. The decision to hire Neville was met with much surprise in Spain, due to his lack of prior experience, and as he was not fluent in Spanish. On 9 December, Neville managed his first game in charge of Valencia, suffering a 2–0 defeat against Lyon in the Champions League; as a result, Valencia finished third in their group, and were demoted to the UEFA Europa League.

On 3 February 2016, Valencia lost 7–0 away to Barcelona in the Copa del Rey semi-final first leg. This came after the team had gone eight games without a victory in La Liga since Neville took over, leading to criticism from the press as well as the club's fans, who called for him to resign. A week later, Valencia were eliminated from the tournament after a 1–1 draw in the return leg.

Having started with a sequence of nine winless league matches, Valencia recorded their first win under Neville in a 2–1 victory at home against Espanyol on 13 February 2016. On 17 March, in the return leg of Valencia's UEFA Europa League round of 16 tie, Neville was sent off for protesting against Athletic Bilbao's goal to the officials; although Valencia won the match 2–1 at home, they were eliminated from the tournament on away goals, following a 2–2 draw on aggregate. On 30 March 2016, Neville was sacked by the club. At the time of his sacking, Valencia were 14th in the league, six points clear of the relegation zone, and had won only three of their 16 league games under Neville, also failing to keep a single clean sheet.

== Club ownership ==
In 2014, it was announced that Neville, along with fellow Manchester United legends Ryan Giggs, Paul Scholes, Nicky Butt and Phil Neville, had agreed to a deal to purchase Salford City ahead of the 2014–15 season, with plans to get the club to The Football League. The group announced they would take part in a special friendly, with Salford facing a Class of '92 team. On 22 September, the group agreed to sell a 50% stake in the club to billionaire Peter Lim. Salford obtained promotion in their first season, as documented in the Class of 92 television programme for the BBC.

== Outside football ==
=== Property developments ===
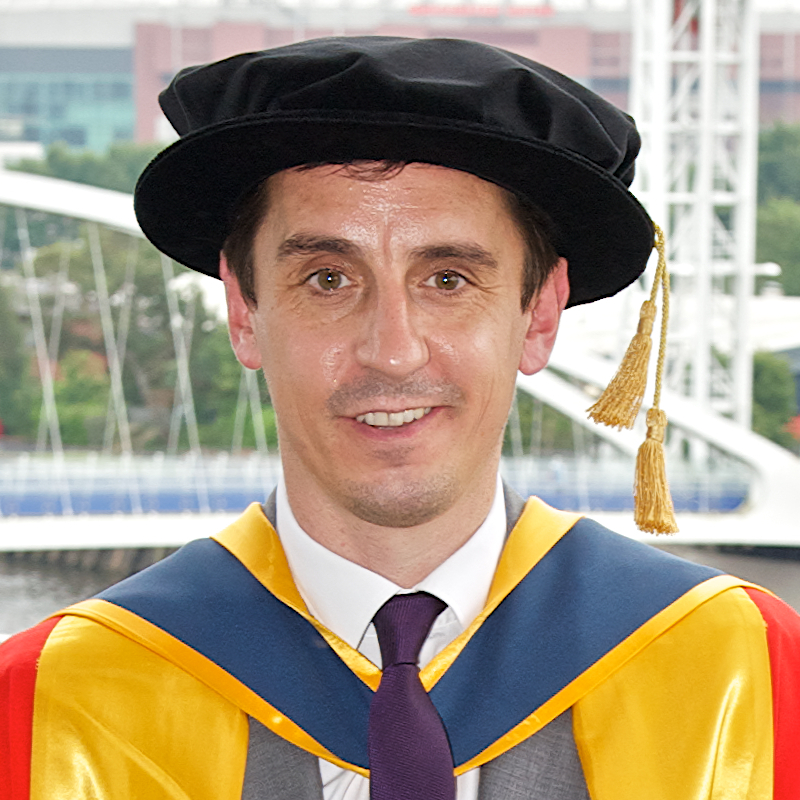
Neville receiving an honorary doctorate from the University of Salford in 2014

Ahead of his testimonial in 2011, Neville revealed he would spend the proceeds towards a supporters club and hotel near Old Trafford. Despite objections from Manchester United, Neville's plans were approved in 2012. In 2013, Neville and Ryan Giggs launched a hospitality company named GG Hospitality, with plans to build football-themed hotels and cafés around the United Kingdom, initially in Manchester and London. The first operation was a football-themed restaurant named Café Football in Stratford, London, which opened in November 2013, with Hotel Football, previously under the guise of the supporters club Neville announced in 2011, scheduled to be opened in late 2014.

In 2015, Neville and Ryan Giggs gained planning permission for a second Manchester hotel which will not be football themed. The pair will be redeveloping Manchester's former stock exchange building into a boutique hotel. Giggs and Neville bought the 1906-built Northern Stock Exchange Building for £1.5 million in 2013. The Grade II-listed building is on 4 Norfolk Street and will have 35 beds, a gym, spa, roof-top terrace, restaurant and bar. Zerum, Gary Neville's property consultancy, acted as agents for the application for planning permission.

Along with other United players who won the 1992 FA Youth Cup, Neville founded a higher education institution in Greater Manchester, named University Academy 92 which offers "broader courses than traditional degrees" and aims to attract students who "otherwise might not go on to higher education". It opened in September 2019 in Old Trafford, Greater Manchester. As of August 2022, it has 400 students.

In January 2022, it was announced that construction had begun on the £120 million St Michael's redevelopment project in Manchester city centre. The development will feature "a new public space (St Michael's Square), 191 hotel rooms, 181 apartments and a rooftop restaurant capable of hosting 900 guests".

=== Media career ===
Neville wrote a weekly full-page column in the Sports section of The Sunday Times of Malta, the widest circulating newspaper in the country, which is home to the oldest recognised Manchester United Supporters' Club. He joined Sky Sports at the start of the 2011–12 season, taking over as match analyst on Monday Night Football from Andy Gray alongside Jamie Redknapp. Neville had previously done some punditry work for ITV Sport during the 2002 World Cup, which he missed due to injury, and for Euro 2008, which England did not qualify for. In 2014, he began presenting Sky Sports' Monday Night Football with broadcaster Ed Chamberlin. Former England teammate and retired Liverpool defender Jamie Carragher joined a year later. Neville and Carragher have been praised for their analysis, with their former on-field rivalry adding to their personalities on-air. His commentary for a Fernando Torres goal for Chelsea against Barcelona in the 2011–12 UEFA Champions League semi-finals second leg garnered notoriety and was dubbed a "Goalgasm". On 8 August 2014, The Daily Telegraph announced that Neville would be joining their staff as a columnist.

In taking his managerial job at Valencia in December 2015, Neville quit his position as a regular Sky Sports pundit after four years in the job. After being sacked from the club during the 2015–16 season after only four months, in 2016, Neville returned to his position as a pundit for Sky Sports for the 2016–17 season. Neville participated as a pundit in ITV's coverage of 2018 FIFA World Cup. and in the 2020 UEFA European Championship. In 2021, Neville started his own YouTube channel, named The Overlap, on which he interviews figures from the world of sport. In January 2026, it was announced that Global Media & Entertainment had acquired a majority stake in The Overlap, Neville remained involved in the business following the transaction, which established a partnership to expand The Overlap’s media operations across multiple sports formats.

Neville has regularly been praised for his well-researched and neutral analysis, and he is now regarded as one of the best football pundits on British television, with Gary Lineker saying he would like to work with Neville on Match of the Day, and Des Lynam also praising his switch from player to pundit. Neville has also received criticism from some in the sport for being overly opinionated or excessively harsh in his analyses; in 2011, Chelsea manager André Villas-Boas spoke out against comments Neville had made about Chelsea during a period of poor form, accusing him of being "biased", while in 2016, Hernán Crespo was critical both of Neville's punditry and his tenure as Valencia's manager, stating, "To watch a game from the TV, it's very different than from the bench. I'm almost happy for Gary Neville's troubles at Valencia. I remember he was too harsh as a TV pundit."

Neville has spoken out publicly against the dominance of foreign players in the Premier League. In 2013, he said: "We have reached a tipping point. You have Cristiano Ronaldo at Real Madrid and Lionel Messi at Barcelona but in the Spanish league 63 per cent of their players are still Spanish. That sounds about right. We've gone too far in England. We're maybe 20 per cent off. We need to give chances to our own." In July 2018, Neville was interviewed by the Digital, Culture, Media and Sport Committee about the proposed sale of Wembley Stadium. Neville described it as a "short-term plan we'll regret forever". He suggested taking a 25% cut of agents' fees to fund grassroots football instead.

In 2021, when reports emerged that a number of European clubs (including six Premier League clubs) were breaking away from the European football pyramid system to form a European Super League without meritocratic relegation and promotion, Neville publicly opposed the plans. Shortly thereafter, the European Super League collapsed amid a strong backlash. Two weeks later, Neville expressed support for Anti-Glazer protests, which occurred in light of the attempted creation of the European Super League, and is part of a movement dating back to 2005.

In 2024, Neville began making guest appearances on the British reality television business programme Dragons' Den. He has invested in a number of businesses including sports recovery company MyoMaster run by former Harlequins rugby player Joe Gray and his wife, Lottie.

In May 2025, ahead of the final weekend of the 2024–25 Premier League season, Neville was refused accreditation to enter the City Ground by Nottingham Forest, forcing Sky to select a different commentary team for the game; this came following critical comments Neville had made about Forest owner Evangelos Marinakis earlier in the month.

=== Personal life ===
Neville's father, Neville Neville, was a former league cricketer. His mother Jill used to play netball in the local leagues, and was general manager and club secretary for Football League club Bury.

Neville was a talented cricketer as a schoolboy and played alongside future England captain Michael Vaughan at the Bunbury Cricket Festival and younger brother Phil for Lancashire's Under-14 team, and also for Greenmount Cricket Club in the Bolton Cricket League, for whom on 19 July 1992 he scored 110 not out in an unbroken partnership of 236 with Australian professional Matthew Hayden in a Hamer Cup tie against Astley Bridge.

In 1999, Neville was best man for the wedding of team-mate David Beckham and Victoria Adams. Neville married Emma Hadfield on 16 June 2007; they have two daughters.

In July 2009, he was awarded an honorary degree from the University of Bolton for his outstanding contributions to football.

In January 2010, it was reported that Neville has applied for planning permission to build an eco-friendly home, which would be the first zero-carbon house in northwest England. Neville's testimonial game was reported to be the most eco-friendly game in English football history.

Neville endorsed the Labour Party in the 2019 United Kingdom general election, joining the party in 2022. He criticised the party for not opposing the Conservative government's lockdown restrictions during the 2020–2021 COVID-19 pandemic, arguing businesses should receive more economic support. Prior to the 2024 general election he appeared in a party election broadcast with Labour leader Keir Starmer.

On 16 April 2022, Neville was banned from driving after reaching 12 penalty points on his licence and issued an apology.

Neville drew public criticism for his support and financial partnership with the 2022 World Cup in Qatar, where he worked for the Qatari national broadcaster for an undisclosed fee. He was criticised by Ian Hislop on an episode of Have I Got News for You prior to the World Cup, for supporting a state known for serious human rights abuses.

== Career statistics ==
=== Club ===
Appearances and goals by club, season and competition
Club	Season	League			FA Cup		League Cup		Europe		Other (Note: Includes other competitive competitions, including the FA Community Shield, UEFA Super Cup, Intercontinental Cup, FIFA Club World Cup)		Total	
Club	Season	Division	Apps	Goals	Apps	Goals	Apps	Goals	Apps	Goals	Apps	Goals	Apps	Goals
Manchester United	1992–93	Premier League	0	0	0	0	0	0	1	0	–		1	0
Manchester United	1993–94	Premier League	1	0	0	0	0	0	1	0	0	0	2	0
Manchester United	1994–95	Premier League	18	0	4	0	3	0	2	0	0	0	27	0
Manchester United	1995–96	Premier League	31	0	6	0	1	0	1	0	–		39	0
Manchester United	1996–97	Premier League	31	1	3	0	1	0	10	0	1	0	46	1
Manchester United	1997–98	Premier League	34	0	3	0	0	0	8	0	0	0	45	0
Manchester United	1998–99	Premier League	34	1	7	0	0	0	12	0	1	0	54	1
Manchester United	1999–2000	Premier League	22	0	–		0	0	9	0	4	0	35	0
Manchester United	2000–01	Premier League	32	1	2	0	0	0	14	0	1	0	49	1
Manchester United	2001–02	Premier League	34	0	2	0	0	0	14	0	1	0	51	0
Manchester United	2002–03	Premier League	26	0	3	0	5	0	10	1	–		44	1
Manchester United	2003–04	Premier League	30	2	4	0	1	0	7	0	0	0	42	2
Manchester United	2004–05	Premier League	22	0	4	0	1	0	7	1	1	0	35	1
Manchester United	2005–06	Premier League	25	0	3	0	5	0	4	0	–		37	0
Manchester United	2006–07	Premier League	24	0	3	0	0	0	6	0	–		33	0
Manchester United	2007–08	Premier League	0	0	0	0	0	0	1	0	0	0	1	0
Manchester United	2008–09	Premier League	16	0	2	0	3	0	4	0	4	0	29	0
Manchester United	2009–10	Premier League	17	0	1	0	4	0	6	0	0	0	28	0
Manchester United	2010–11	Premier League	3	0	0	0	1	0	0	0	0	0	4	0
Career total			400	5	47	0	25	0	117	2	13	0	602	7

=== International ===
Appearances and goals by national team and year
National team	Year	Apps	Goals
England	1995	6	0
England	1996	10	0
England	1997	7	0
England	1998	8	0
England	1999	3	0
England	2000	7	0
England	2001	8	0
England	2002	5	0
England	2003	7	0
England	2004	12	0
England	2005	4	0
England	2006	7	0
England	2007	1	0
Total		85	0

== Managerial statistics ==
As of 30 March 2016

Managerial record by team and tenure
Team	Nat	From	To	Record							
Team	Nat	From	To	G	W	D	L	GF	GA	GD	Win %
Valencia	(Spain)	2 December 2015	30 March 2016	28	10	7	11	39	38	+1	35.71
Total				28	10	7	11	39	38	+1	35.71

== Honours ==
Manchester United

- Premier League: 1995–96, 1996–97, 1998–99, 1999–2000, 2000–01, 2002–03, 2006–07, 2008–09
- FA Cup: 1995–96, 1998–99, 2003–04; runner-up: 2004–05
- Football League Cup: 2005–06, 2008–09, 2009–10; runner-up: 2002–03
- FA Charity / Community Shield: 1996, 1997, 2008
- UEFA Champions League: 1998–99, 2007–08
- Intercontinental Cup: 1999
- FIFA Club World Cup: 2008

England U18

- UEFA under-18 Championship: 1993

England

- Tournoi de France: 1997

Individual

- PFA Team of the Year: 1996–97 Premier League, 1997–98 Premier League, 1998–99 Premier League, 2004–05 Premier League, 2006–07 Premier League
- PFA Team of the Century (1997–2007): 2007
- ESM Team of the Year: 1997–98
- FWA Tribute Award: 2012
- Premier League 10 Seasons Awards (1992–93 to 2001–02):
  - Domestic & Overall Team of the Decade
- Premier League 20 Seasons Awards (1992–93 to 2011–12):
  - Fantasy Teams of the 20 Seasons (Panel & Public choice)
- English Football Hall of Fame Inductee: 2015
- Premier League Hall of Fame: 2025
- He was awarded the Honorary degree of Doctor of Arts (D.Arts) by the University of Bolton in 2009.
- He was awarded the Honorary degree of Doctor of Science (D.Sc) by the University of Salford on 18 July 2014.
- He was awarded the Honorary degree of Doctor of the University (D.Univ) by the Queen's University Belfast on 2 December 2025.

== See also ==
- List of footballers with 100 or more UEFA Champions League appearances
- List of one-club men in association football
