= Alan Tonge =

English footballer

Personal information
- Full name: Alan John Tonge
- Date of birth: 25 February 1972 (age 54)
- Place of birth: Bury, England
- Positions: Full back; midfielder

Youth career
- Bolton Lads Club
- Manchester United

Senior career*
Years	Team	Apps	(Gls)
1990–1991	Manchester United	0	(0)
1991	Horwich RMI		
1991–1994	Exeter City	19	(1)
- Elmore
- * Club domestic league appearances and goals

Alan John Tonge (born 25 February 1972) is an English former professional footballer who played as a full back and a midfielder in the Football League for Exeter City.

== Playing career ==
Tonge signed for Manchester United as a 14 year old in January 1987 and holds the distinction of being Sir Alex Ferguson's first ever acquisition at the club. He progressed his way through the junior, youth and reserve sides signing a professional contract in July 1990. He played in a couple of first team friendlies but found further chances hard to come by. After failing to break into the first team at a competitive level, Tonge left United in July 1991. Whilst searching for other opportunities he joined non-league side Horwich RMI to maintain fitness. Not long after, Tonge had worked his way back into the Football League, signing for Alan Ball at Exeter City for an undisclosed fee. Tonge made his football league debut for Exeter against Wigan Athletic on the 8th February, 1992. Over the course of two seasons at Exeter, Tonge made 19 league appearances for the club, scoring once and was awarded young player of the year in 1992/1993. In that season, he endeared himself to Exeter fans by being named man of the match in a 2-0 Boxing Day derby win v Plymouth Argyle. Tonge also played in a number of cup games to help Exeter to the regional final of the Autoglass Trophy against Port Vale. However, after only 27 league and cup appearances and 2 goals, Tonge's career in full time professional football was over when he was advised to retire with a serious back issue. Screws and plates had to be inserted into the base of his spine following two operations. Over a year of intense rehabilitation proved unfruitful and his full time career was finished. Following retirement, Tonge found giving up football extremely tough and turned out part time for Devon non-league sides Elmore and Clyst Rovers before deciding to come away from football permanently.

== Post-playing career ==
Following his retirement from professional football, Tonge re-engaged with his education and has gained a BSc degree in Sports Science and a PGCE from the University of Bolton, before completing a master's degree in philosophy and a PhD at Liverpool John Moores University.

Tonge is currently a lecturer in sports research at UCFB and does Exeter City match commentary for BBC Radio Devon. He is also a member of the Association of Former Manchester United Players (AFMUP) and is an advocate for raising mental health awareness through undertaking charity work for Manchester Mind.
