= Giuliano Maiorana =

Italian-English footballer (born 1969)

Personal information
- Date of birth: 18 April 1969 (age 57)
- Place of birth: Cambridge, England
- Height: 5 ft 10 in (1.78 m)
- Position: Left winger

Senior career*
Years	Team	Apps	(Gls)
1987–1988	Histon		
1988–1994	Manchester United	7	(0)
1995	Ljungskile SK	5	(0)
- Newmarket Town
- * Club domestic league appearances and goals

Giuliano Maiorana (born 18 April 1969), commonly known as Jules Maiorana, is a former professional footballer who played as a left winger. Born in England to Italian parents, Maiorana was spotted and signed by Manchester United while he was playing for Histon in the semi-professional Eastern Counties Football League.

== Career ==
=== Early career ===
Maiorana was born in Cambridge, England, to Italian parents. In 1987, he had been playing Sunday League football before signing for Eastern Counties League club Histon, after they spotted him during a local five-a-side that was taking place at their home ground.

=== Manchester United ===
After around 30 games for Histon's first team, and having previously been turned down by Cambridge United, Brentford and Norwich City, he was invited for a trial for Manchester United in November 1988. He played the first half of a testimonial match for Ian Handysides of Birmingham City, producing a performance described by Alex Ferguson as "one of the best displays I have ever seen from a trialist", and signed a four-year contract with United for a fee of £30,000, amid interest from other clubs including Chelsea, Watford, and Tottenham Hotspur. The fee saved Histon, who were £23,000 in debt and at risk of bankruptcy.

Maiorana made his debut on 14 January 1989 as a substitute against Millwall in the First Division, and came to prominence with an exciting display on his first start, in a live televised 1–1 draw with Arsenal (who finished the season as league champions) at Old Trafford that April. Maiorana only started one more game, and made his last two substitute appearances in October 1989. Near the end of 1989, he was sent to reserves, where he suffered a serious knee injury in a match against the Aston Villa reserves after being tackled by Dwight Yorke. After his injury, he remained with the reserves, but was unable to leave the club due to the Bosman ruling not being created yet. He was finally able to leave on a free transfer at the end of the 1993–94 season.

=== Late career ===
After leaving United, Maiorana had a brief spell with Ljungskile SK, where he made five appearances, of which four were as a substitute, in the Swedish second-tier Division 1. He then returned home to work in his family's upholstery business, and played for Newmarket Town in the Eastern Counties League Premier Division.

In 2008 and 2009, Maiorana played for Manchester United's Masters Football team in the North West Masters Cup.

== Career statistics ==
Appearances and goals by club, season and competition
Club	Season	League			National Cup		League Cup		Europe		Total	
Club	Season	Division	Apps	Goals	Apps	Goals	Apps	Goals	Apps	Goals	Apps	Goals
Manchester United	1988–89	First Division	6	0	0	0	0	0	0	0	6	0
Manchester United	1989–90	First Division	1	0	0	0	1	0	0	0	2	0
Manchester United	Total		7	0	0	0	1	0	0	0	8	0
Ljungskile SK	1995	Division 1	5	0	0	0	—		0	0	5	0
Career Total			12	0	0	0	1	0	0	0	13	0
