= Deiniol Graham =

English footballer and manager

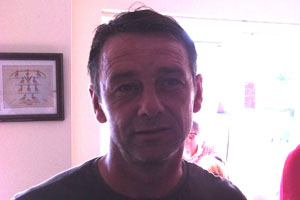
- Graham in 2013

Personal information
- Full name: Deiniol William Thomas Graham
- Date of birth: 4 October 1969 (age 57)
- Place of birth: Cannock, Staffordshire, England
- Height: 1.79 m (5 ft 10 1/2 in)
- Position: Striker

Youth career
- 1985–1987: Manchester United

Senior career*
Years	Team	Apps	(Gls)
1987–1991	Manchester United	4	(1)
1991–1994	Barnsley	28	(2)
1992	→ Preston North End (loan)	8	(0)
1993	→ Carlisle United (loan)	2	(1)
1994–1995	Stockport County	11	(2)
1995	Scunthorpe United	3	(1)
1995	Halifax Town	1	(0)
1995–1996	Dagenham & Redbridge		
- Emley
- Colwyn Bay
- Cwmbran Town
- Colwyn Bay
2003–?	Rhyl		

International career
1991	Wales U21	1	(0)

Managerial career
- 2007–?: Llandudno
- 2011–2012: Llandudno
- * Club domestic league appearances and goals

Deiniol William Thomas Graham (born 4 October 1969) is a football manager and former player. He played as a forward for various clubs in the Football League after playing in the Manchester United youth and reserve teams.

== Playing career ==
Born in Cannock, Staffordshire, Graham grew up in Caergeiliog, Anglesey. He signed for Manchester United as an apprentice in October 1985 and left school in the summer of 1986. He turned professional a year later, and made his debut for the first team in the 1987–88 season, coming on as a 53rd-minute substitute for Mike Duxbury in the club's League Cup Second Round second leg match against Hull City on 7 October 1987. He made one further appearance that season.

Graham scored his first and only goal for the Manchester United first team on 11 January 1989 in a 2–2 draw with Queens Park Rangers in an FA Cup Third Round replay. However, just over a month later, he suffered a broken arm in a youth team match against Bury Reserves and was ruled out for eight months, severely denting his first team opportunities. He only made one more appearance for the first team before Mel Machin signed him for Barnsley for £50,000 on 5 August 1991.

At Barnsley, Graham's first-team opportunities were more frequent but he was still unable to hold down a regular place, making around 40 appearances and scoring just two goals in his three years there. In 1992, he was loaned out to Preston North End, where he made 11 appearances and scored one goal, in the FA Cup. A loan spell at Carlisle United followed in 1993, and Graham was given a free transfer by Barnsley at the end of the 1993–94 season.

He was then picked up by Stockport County, scoring two goals in 11 matches before joining Scunthorpe United a year later, but after two months there, including three appearances and one goal, he moved into non-league football.

He joined Emley, where for the 1996–97 season, he was the club's top scorer with 29 goals, the second highest that season in the Northern Premier League Premier Division. The following season he was a member of the club's memorable FA Cup run scoring in the third and fourth qualifying rounds against Belper and Nuneaton Borough respectively. He scored again the penalty shoot out in the first round replay which resulted in victory against Morecambe, as well as in the second round in a second round draw against Lincoln City. After going through in the replay, the club were drawn against West Ham United in round three. Although Emley lost the game 2–1, they gave the Premier League side, which included the likes of Rio Ferdinand and Frank Lampard, a real fear of one of the greatest FA Cup upsets of all time.

He later played for Colwyn Bay, then moved to Cwmbran Town for a season before returning to Colwyn Bay. He also played for Bangor City and Rhyl in the Welsh Premier League, as well as Caersws and Llandudno.

== Managerial career ==
At the end of his playing career, Graham moved into management in March 2007 where he was made joint manager of Llandudno. He rejoined them in October 2011 for a second management spell. He left the club in November 2012.

== Personal life ==
In March 2022, he was disqualified from driving and given six points on his licence and fined £800 for an alleged offence in June 2021 in Prestatyn where he failed to provide the identity of the driver of a car registered in his name.

== See also ==
- Fergie's Fledglings
