= Tony Gill =

English footballer

Personal information
- Full name: Anthony Dean Gill
- Date of birth: 6 March 1968 (age 58)
- Place of birth: Bradford, Yorkshire, England
- Height: 5 ft 9 in (1.75 m)
- Positions: Midfielder; full back

Youth career
- 1984–1986: Manchester United

Senior career*
Years	Team	Apps	(Gls)
1986–1990	Manchester United	10	(1)
1997	Bath City	2	(0)
- * Club domestic league appearances and goals

Anthony Dean Gill (born 6 March 1968) is an English former professional footballer who spent his entire, short-lived professional career with Manchester United.

Born in Bradford, Yorkshire, Gill joined Manchester United as an apprentice in June 1984, and turned professional on his 18th birthday in March 1986. His first team debut for the club came 10 months later, when he stood in for Bryan Robson in a 1–1 draw away to Southampton on 3 January 1987. However, he was then diagnosed with problems with his Achilles tendon and it took two operations before he could return to first team action nearly two years later. In fact, he did not play at all between January and August 1988.

Upon his return to the first team, Gill became an established member of the squad, playing in various roles in both defence and midfield.

He scored twice for United at senior level; the first in the FA Cup third round replay against QPR at Loftus Road on 11 January 1989 – 10 days after a fine performance in the 3–1 home league win over rivals Liverpool. His next goal came three days after, on 14 January, in a 3–0 home win over Millwall in the league.

On 27 March 1989, Gill came off worse in an accidental collision with Nottingham Forest defender Brian Laws in a 2-0 league defeat at the City Ground, suffering a broken leg and a shattered ankle. Gill never played professional football again, announcing his retirement on medical advice the following year.

Upon his recovery, Gill went into coaching and took a job as youth coach at Bristol Rovers. He joined Bath City in March 1997 as assistant to manager Steve Millard, also making two first team appearances to briefly revive his playing career after eight years out of action. He was released by Bath in September 1997 for financial reasons and later retired from football altogether.
