= British Sports Journalism Awards winners for Sports Scoop of the Year =

The British Sports Journalism Awards are given annually in a number of categories. The category "Sports Scoop" has been awarded since 2010.

== Sports Scoop of the Year winners ==
- 2018: tbc
- 2017: Martha Kelner & Sean Ingle – The Guardian & Observer – Chris Froome failed drugs test
- 2016: Daniel Taylor – The Guardian and Observer – Andy Woodward Sexual Abuse
- 2015: Jonathan Calvert, George Arbuthnot, David Collins, The Insight Team – The Sunday Times – Doping Scandal: Sport's Dirtiest Secrets
- 2014: Heidi Blake and Jonathan Calvert – Sunday Times – Plot to bust the World Cup
- 2013: Mark Ogden – The Daily Telegraph
- 2012: Lawrence Booth – The Daily Mail – Kevin Pietersen text scandal in England cricket
- 2011: Mark Souster – The Times – Leaked document exposes England Rugby World Cup shame
- 2010: Mazher Mahmood – News of the World – Pakistani spot-fixing scandal
