= British Sports Journalism Awards winners for Sports Writer of the Year =

Annual award winners for sports journalism

The British Sports Journalism Awards are given annually in a number of categories. The category "Sports Writer of the Year" is part of the awards for sports writing and has been awarded since inception. Records date back to 2005.

== Sports Writer of the Year Winners ==
- 2018: Daniel Taylor – The Guardian and Observer
- 2017: Paul Hayward – The Daily Telegraph
- 2016: Paul Hayward – The Telegraph
- 2015: Martin Samuel – Daily Mail
- 2014: Martin Samuel – Daily Mail
- 2013: Martin Samuel – Daily Mail
- 2012: Paul Hayward – The Telegraph
- 2011: Michael Atherton – The Times
- 2010: Martin Samuel – Daily Mail
- 2009: Michael Atherton – The Times
- 2008: Patrick Collins – The Mail on Sunday
- 2007: Martin Samuel – The Times
- 2006: Martin Samuel – The Times
- 2005: Martin Samuel – The Times
