= 2005 FA Cup final =

English football match

- The match programme cover
- Event: 2004–05 FA Cup
Arsenal	Manchester United
0	0
- After extra time Arsenal won 5–4 on penalties
- Date: 21 May 2005
- Venue: Millennium Stadium, Cardiff
- Man of the Match: Wayne Rooney (Manchester United)
- Referee: Rob Styles (Hampshire)
- Attendance: 71,876
- Weather: Mostly cloudy, rain showers 10 °C (50 °F)

The 2005 FA Cup final was a football match played between Arsenal and Manchester United on 21 May 2005 at the Millennium Stadium, Cardiff. It was the final match of the 2004–05 FA Cup, the 124th season of English football's primary cup competition, the FA Cup. Arsenal became the first team to win the FA Cup via a penalty shoot-out, after neither side managed to score in the initial 90 minutes or in 30 minutes of extra time. The shoot-out finished 5–4 to Arsenal, with Patrick Vieira scoring the winning penalty after Paul Scholes' shot was saved by Arsenal goalkeeper Jens Lehmann.

As both teams were in the highest tier of English football, the Premier League, Arsenal and Manchester United entered the competition in the third round. Matches up to the semi-final were contested on a one-off basis, with a replay taking place if the match ended in a draw. Both clubs only needed one replay along the way to the final; Arsenal's tie against Sheffield United in the fifth round was decided by a penalty shootout, whereas Manchester United overcame non-league Exeter City in the third round, after the original tie ended goalless.

Protests over the impending takeover of Manchester United by American businessman Malcolm Glazer had threatened to overshadow the final, though demonstrations in Cardiff required little intervention from the police. Both managers for the final made surprising changes to their team; Arsène Wenger unconventionally deployed a defensive formation, while Sir Alex Ferguson left midfielder Ryan Giggs on the bench. Manchester United dominated the match, creating four times as many shots as their opponents, but struggled to find the breakthrough. In extra time, Arsenal's José Antonio Reyes was sent off for a second bookable offence, becoming only the second player to be sent off in an FA Cup final.

The British press unanimously agreed that Arsenal were fortunate to win; Wenger himself admitted so in his press conference afterwards. A television audience of over 480 million worldwide watched the final; in the United Kingdom, coverage of the match peaked at 12.8 million, making it the highest-rated FA Cup match since the 1996 final.

This was the 10th time that Arsenal won the FA Cup, and for the fourth time under Wenger's management. They would go on to play Premiership champions Chelsea in the 2005 FA Community Shield. Since both finalists had already qualified for the following season's UEFA Champions League, the UEFA Cup spot for the cup winners was passed onto the sixth placed team in the Premiership, which was Bolton Wanderers.

== Route to the final ==
The FA Cup is English football's primary cup competition. Clubs in the Premier League enter the FA Cup in the third round and are drawn randomly with the remaining clubs. If a match is drawn, the tie is replayed at the ground of the away team from the original match. As with league fixtures, FA Cup matches are subject to change in the event of games being selected for television coverage and this often can be influenced by clashes with other competitions. In September 2004, it was announced that the Millennium Stadium was chosen as the venue for the semi-finals, in addition to the final.

=== Arsenal ===
Round	Opposition	Score
3rd	Stoke City (H)	2–1
4th	Wolverhampton Wanderers (H)	2–0
5th	Sheffield United (H)	1–1
5th	Sheffield United (A)	0–0 (4–2 pen)
6th	Bolton Wanderers (A)	1–0
SF	Blackburn Rovers (N)	3–0
Key: (h) = Home venue; (a) = Away venue; (n) = Neutral venue.

Arsenal's cup run started with a home tie against Stoke City. The visitors took the lead just before the break, but goals from José Antonio Reyes and Robin van Persie in the second half meant Arsenal won 2–1. They then faced Wolverhampton Wanderers at home in the next round; a goal apiece from Patrick Vieira and Freddie Ljungberg secured a comfortable 2–0 victory.

Arsenal's opponent in the fifth round was Sheffield United. After 35 minutes Dennis Bergkamp was sent off for his apparent push on Danny Cullip. With eleven minutes of normal time remaining, Robert Pires scored for Arsenal, but the team conceded a late penalty which Andy Gray converted. The equaliser for Sheffield United meant the match was replayed at Bramall Lane on 1 March 2005. Both teams played out a goalless draw after full-time and throughout extra-time, so the tie was decided by a penalty shootout. Arsenal goalkeeper Manuel Almunia saved two penalties, which ensured progress into the quarter-finals.

Bolton Wanderers hosted Arsenal at the Reebok Stadium in the sixth round of the competition. Ljungberg scored the only goal of the tie after just three minutes; he had an opportunity to extend Arsenal's lead in stoppage time, but hit the ball over from six yards. It was described by BBC Sport as the "most glaring miss of the match, if not the entire season".

Arsenal faced Blackburn Rovers in the semi-final which was played on 16 April 2005. Two goals from Van Persie and one from Pires gave Arsenal a 3–0 win, in a match marred by Blackburn's aggressive tactics.

=== Manchester United ===
Round	Opposition	Score
3rd	Exeter City (H)	0–0
3rd	Exeter City (A)	2–0
4th	Middlesbrough (H)	3–0
5th	Everton (A)	2–0
6th	Southampton (A)	4–0
SF	Newcastle United (N)	4–1
Key: (h) = Home venue; (a) = Away venue; (n) = Neutral venue.

Manchester United, the holders of the FA Cup, began their defence of the trophy with a home tie against non-league Exeter City. United had made several first team changes and struggled to find a breakthrough in the tie. Even with the second half introductions of Paul Scholes and Cristiano Ronaldo, the visitors held on for a goalless draw. The match was replayed at Exeter's home ground, St James Park on 19 January 2005. Ronaldo scored the opening goal of the match in the ninth minute and Wayne Rooney added a second, three minutes from normal time.

Manchester United's opponents in the fourth round was Middlesbrough. Rooney scored twice in the team's 3–0 victory – he lobbed the ball over goalkeeper Mark Schwarzer for his first goal and volleyed it for his second. Middlesbrough manager Steve McClaren credited Rooney's performance afterwards and said he made the difference in the tie. Everton hosted Manchester United in the next round at Goodison Park. A goal apiece from Quinton Fortune and Ronaldo in either half ensured a 2–0 win.

Southampton was Manchester United's opponent in the sixth round. After two minutes at St Mary's United took the lead; a shot by Roy Keane near the penalty area hit Southampton's Peter Crouch and deflected into the goal. Ronaldo scored United's second and additional goals from Scholes meant they progressed into the last four of the competition; the final score was 4–0.

In the semi-final Manchester United faced Newcastle United at the Millennium Stadium. They took the lead in the 19th minute when Ruud van Nistelrooy scored, and Scholes extended the team's advantage just before half time. Van Nistelrooy made it 3–0 in the 58th minute, before Shola Ameobi scored what proved a mere consolation a minute later, as Ronaldo added United's fourth late on.

== Pre-match ==
The final marked the fifth meeting between the two clubs in the 2004–05 season. Despite finishing six points ahead of Manchester United in the league, Arsenal had lost both league fixtures between the clubs, as well as a League Cup fifth-round tie, which was played out by the clubs' fringe and reserve team players. Arsenal had won the season's first encounter in the FA Community Shield, also at the Millennium Stadium, by a 3–1 scoreline.

The clubs had met in an FA Cup final before – in 1979, when Arsenal won 3–2. Manchester United were appearing in their 17th FA Cup Final, their second in as many years, and had won the FA Cup on 11 of their previous 16 appearances (including beating Millwall in the 2004 final). Two of these victories had yielded a domestic double (in 1994 and 1996) and in 1999 they had won the FA Cup as part of a unique Treble, consisting of the cup, the Premier League and the UEFA Champions League. Arsenal were also appearing in their 17th Cup final – their fourth in five years. They had won the cup nine times previously, most recently in 2003, when they beat Southampton in the final.

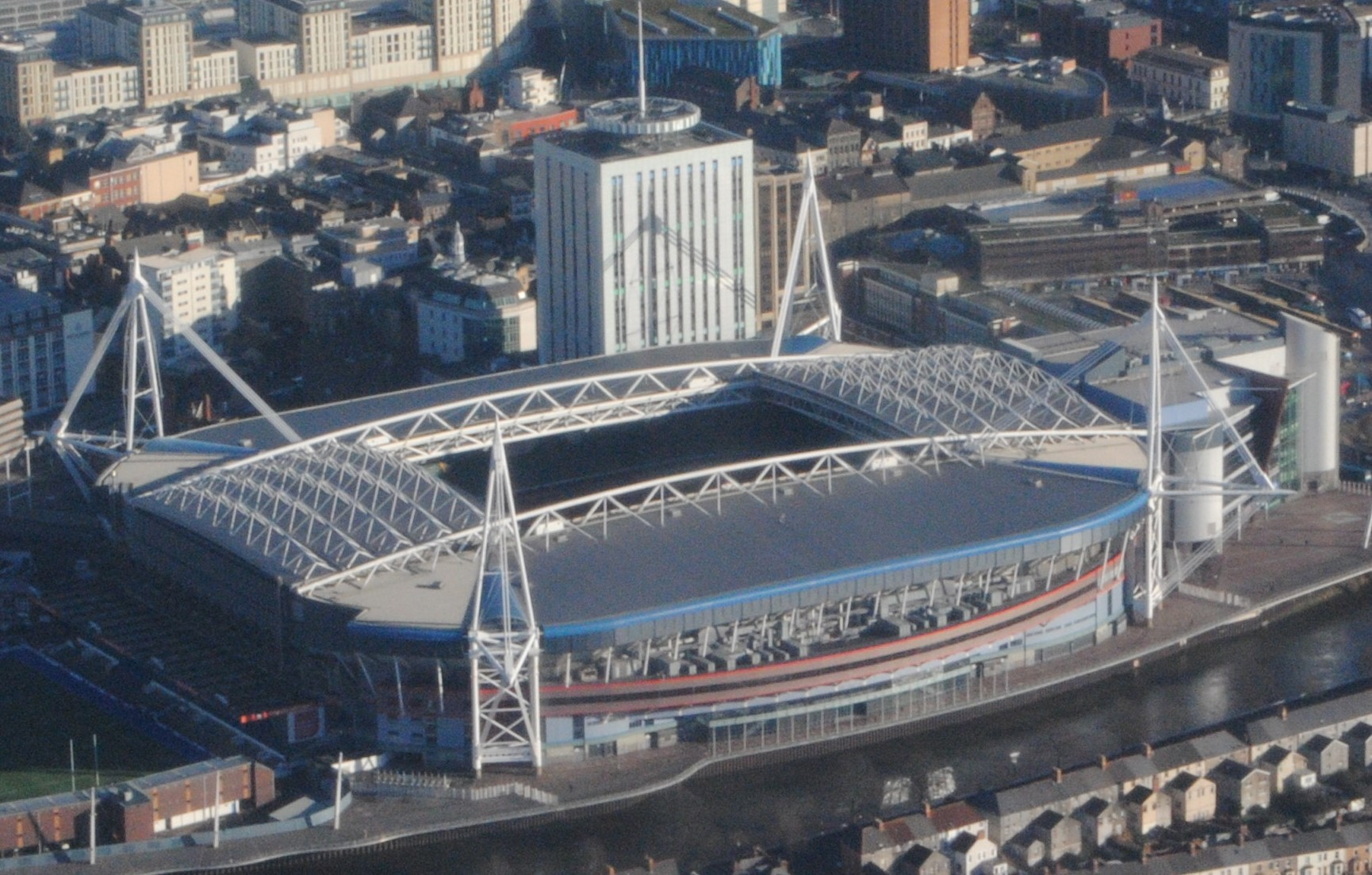
The match was played at the Millennium Stadium in Cardiff for the fifth year in a row.

Meetings between Arsenal and Manchester United were keenly contested during the 2000s and highly publicised by the media; the cup final this season had added significance as neither club won the league after a decade of dominance, and it was their only chance of silverware. The emergence of Chelsea, who were crowned league champions in April, had presented a long-term threat to Arsenal and Manchester United's duopoly on English football, as they were financed by Russian billionaire Roman Abramovich. Chelsea were accused of "tapping-up" Arsenal defender Ashley Cole in January, and were linked to Manchester United's Rio Ferdinand.

Wenger welcomed Chelsea's emergence, describing them as the "third force" in English football, but he raised concerns over their conduct and what he perceived as artificial growth. Asked whether Chelsea could dominate for the foreseeable, Wenger said: "I feel yes, because they are a financially doped club. They have enhancement of performances through financial resources which are unlimited. For me, it's a kind of doping because it's not in any way linked to their resources." Despite the absence of Thierry Henry, ruled out through injury, and Arsenal's poor recent record against Manchester United, Wenger believed his team were more than capable of winning the match: "What is good in football is that it is not predictable. [...] You act now like it is a decade that we haven’t beaten Manchester United – it's not true. It's two games." It was reported on the eve of the final that Philippe Senderos would start ahead of first-teamer Sol Campbell.

Manchester United manager Sir Alex Ferguson dismissed suggestions that his team had been over physical in previous meetings against Arsenal. Referring back to the league fixture in October 2004, he told reporters: "We committed three fouls on Reyes, for instance, but that hardly constitutes The Texas Chain Saw Massacre, does it? There were six by them on Cristiano Ronaldo." He questioned the character of Arsenal's players after they lost their unbeaten record, and likened their protest to propaganda, as a way to disguise their crisis – "...it was convenient for them to say they were kicked off the park." United had struggled to score goals in the lead up to the final, and Ferguson stressed the importance of his team taking their chances. "Big games are usually decided that way. They are so close so that whoever gets in front has an advantage," he said.

=== Planned protests ===
The build-up to the final had focused upon many Manchester United fans' discontent at their takeover by American businessman and sports tycoon Malcolm Glazer, and large demonstrations were planned inside and outside the Millennium Stadium. Despite this, the final was played in the rain and only a small group of around 100 supporters held protests and sang anti-Glazer songs. The police were out in force but did not have any trouble to deal with. Arsenal fans taunted Manchester United fans by waving American flags, sarcastically chanting "U-S-A", and singing "Manchester, Yank, Yank, Yank", in reference to a chant in which "Yank" is replaced with "wank".

== Match ==
=== Team selection ===
Wenger opted for a 4–5–1 formation, with Bergkamp playing as a lone striker. The absence of Henry also opened a place in midfield for Gilberto Silva, while José Antonio Reyes and Pires were selected on the wings ahead of Ljungberg and Robin van Persie, who were both named as substitutes. As anticipated, Senderos's form saw him selected at centre-back ahead of Campbell, despite the England international's return from injury.

Ferguson had a defensive selection dilemma ahead of the final, with both of his starting full-backs, Gabriel Heinze (ankle) and Gary Neville (groin), having suffered injuries. Neville eventually recovered enough to make the substitutes' bench, despite only playing in one of the team's last five games, but Heinze missed the game entirely, Mikaël Silvestre taking his place at left-back. Neville's absence meant that John O'Shea started at right-back. Neville was joined on the bench by winger Ryan Giggs and goalkeeper Tim Howard; Giggs' omission was a surprise, and it meant that Darren Fletcher started on the right wing, while Ronaldo played on the left. Howard, on the other hand, had been competing for the number 1 jersey with Roy Carroll all season, and it was ultimately the Northern Irishman who was picked.

Roy Keane was appearing in his seventh FA Cup Final having previously played in the 1991, 1994, 1995, 1996, 1999 and 2004 finals. This was the most number of finals for a player in the post-war period; by 2010 however, Ashley Cole had reached his eighth final.

=== Summary ===
==== First half ====
Manchester United kicked the game off, and also fashioned the first chance of the game; Ronaldo beat Lauren on the left wing to put over a cross, only for Scholes to head the ball over the crossbar after losing his marker. Two minutes later, a break from José Antonio Reyes had Carroll scampering across from his goal to meet the Spaniard, forcing Reyes wide enough to allow the United defence time to get back.

Manchester United had the ball in the back of the net on 27 minutes, when Ferdinand turned in the rebound after Jens Lehmann saved from Rooney, but the assistant referee ruled that Ferdinand was offside. After a brief Arsenal attack, Silvestre played a long, diagonal ball to Van Nistelrooy on the right wing. The Dutch forward controlled the ball and then outpaced Cole to the goal line; he then cut the ball back to Rooney, whose first-time shot was turned over the bar by Lehmann. The consequent corner broke to Rooney on the edge of the penalty area, but his shot was deflected behind for another corner, which Scholes took. The England midfielder floated the ball over to the edge of the penalty area, where Rooney was waiting, only to volley it just over the bar.

In the closing stages of the first half, Van Nistelrooy got his first shot on goal, turning Senderos only to send the ball trickling along the floor for Lehmann to save comfortably. The first half finished with a foul on Rooney, who had done well to break free of challenges from Cole, Vieira and Senderos, who eventually brought Rooney down. The English forward took the free kick himself, but it went over the bar to cheers from the Arsenal fans and the sound of the referee's half-time whistle.

==== Second half ====
Manchester United fashioned the first chance of the second half after just three minutes, when Rooney cut inside from the right along the face of the penalty area, but his left-footed shot was blocked away for a corner kick. Soon after, Van Nistelrooy received the ball on the edge of the penalty area and held it up before playing a through-ball to Keane, but the Irishman's low cross was diverted behind by Kolo Touré before it reached Rooney. United then had their third chance in the space of five minutes when Ronaldo shot just wide from 25 yards, from the left corner of the penalty area.

Throughout the match, Lauren committed several fouls on Ronaldo, and confronted the Portuguese winger early in the second half, before finally being booked for persistent fouling in the 62nd minute. Ronaldo took the free kick himself but put it just over the bar from 30 yards. In the 64th minute, Arsenal were awarded a free kick for an O'Shea foul on Reyes; Bergkamp took the kick, which was headed away by Ferdinand, but only as far as Pires, whose side-footed volley went over the bar. The free kick was to be Bergkamp's last contribution to the final, as he was then substituted by Ljungberg in the 65th minute.

United then went back downfield and Ronaldo took on Lauren, who dared not dive in for a tackle and risk a second yellow card. Ronaldo got past the Cameroonian full-back and then chipped a cross into the penalty area, but Van Nistelrooy was unable to make enough contact with the ball to force his header on target. A minute later, Silvestre found Rooney with another diagonal pass; Rooney attempted to drive in a low cross, but it ended up heading towards goal and came back off the foot of the post. Fletcher was first to the ball but he fired a shot across the face of the goal and out for a goal kick. With their very next attack, United sent Ronaldo away down the left wing again; he sent over another cross, but it was again too far in front of Van Nistelrooy.

Reyes received his first yellow card in the 76th minute, when he was late in tackling Silvestre after the French defender had played a backpass to Carroll. The break in play allowed Manchester United to make their first substitution, bringing on Fortune for O'Shea, who appeared to be struggling with a calf injury. With six minutes left in normal time, United won a corner on the left hand side, which Ronaldo played short to Scholes. Scholes returned the ball to Ronaldo, who crossed it into the penalty area, where Keane was unmarked at the back post. The ball eventually broke to the United captain, who shot, only to see four Arsenal players between him and the goal, ready to block his effort behind for another corner. Lehmann came to meet the second corner kick, but missed the ball, allowing it to go all the way through to Van Nistelrooy; the Dutchman headed the ball goalwards, but Ljungberg was on the line and headed it up onto the crossbar and away.

Arsenal then made their second substitution, bringing on Van Persie in place of Cesc Fàbregas. As the match entered injury time at the end of the second half, Ronaldo made yet another run down the left wing, outpacing Lauren to Rooney's through-ball. The ball broke back to Rooney 30 yards from goal, but his shot went over the bar. The second half finished with a Wes Brown cross from the right wing that made its way across the penalty area to Ronaldo, but the Portuguese could only head the ball straight at Lehmann.

==== Extra time ====
Manchester United brought Giggs on at the start of extra time, the Welshman taking Fletcher's place in the midfield. They immediately tried to play him in down the left wing, but the pass was over-hit and went beyond Giggs. Arsenal finally got their first shot on target in the seventh minute of extra time, when a Van Persie free kick – awarded for a foul by Silvestre – forced a diving save from Carroll. Four minutes later, Manchester United appealed for a penalty kick when a cross from Giggs struck Cole, but replays showed that the ball hit the Arsenal full-back in the midriff. United sustained their attack, and the ball came to Scholes in the penalty area, but his shot on the turn was well saved by Lehmann. The resultant corner was taken short by Scholes, before it was played back to him; his cross found Van Nistelrooy unmarked in the area, but the Dutchman headed over the bar from the edge of the goal area. United then had another penalty shout when Giggs volleyed a long ball from Scholes into Touré's body and up onto the Ivorian's hand, but referee Rob Styles turned their claims down. Arsenal then brought on Edu to replace Pires for the remaining 15 minutes.

The second half of extra time began with yet another chance for Manchester United, this time constructed from a Giggs break down the left wing, but Van Nistelrooy failed in his attempt to back-heel Giggs' cross into the goal and the opportunity was wasted. Five minutes into the second half, Reyes committed another late tackle on Silvestre, for which he received a final warning from referee Styles. Reyes himself was then the victim of a late tackle by Scholes, who was shown a yellow card. The match threatened to descend into a mass brawl soon after, when Fortune caught Ljungberg in the face with a flailing arm and then committed a high tackle on Edu, provoking a reaction from the Arsenal players. A shoulder-charge by Rooney on Cole resulted in an Arsenal free kick on the left wing; Van Persie swung the ball over and it was only cleared as far as Ljungberg, but the Swede struck a shot with his shin and the ball spun wide. With a couple of minutes left in the extra period, Manchester United won a free kick on the left corner of the Arsenal penalty area when Vieira lazily tripped Ronaldo and received a booking, but Giggs' cross from the free kick was headed away. Meanwhile, Manchester United's substitute goalkeeper, Howard, was seen warming up behind the goal, suggesting that he was preparing to come on for Carroll in the event of a penalty shootout; however, no substitution was made.

The referee added two minutes of injury time at the end of extra time, during which time Manchester United won another free kick, but Scholes' shot was straight at the Arsenal defensive wall. Then, with just seconds left in regulation time, Ronaldo made a break towards the Arsenal half, only to be cynically body-checked by Reyes. Referee Styles made no hesitation and showed Reyes a second yellow card, making the Spaniard the second player to be sent off in an FA Cup Final, after Manchester United's Kevin Moran in 1985. The full-time whistle went immediately after Reyes' dismissal, and the match finished at 0–0, making it the first FA Cup Final to result in a penalty shootout.

==== Penalty shootout ====
Van Nistelrooy took the first penalty for Manchester United, in front of the United fans, and sent Lehmann the wrong way to give United the early advantage. Lauren then converted the next penalty for Arsenal, before Scholes stepped up to take United's second, only to see it saved by Lehmann, diving low to his right. The next six penalties were all scored – Ljungberg, Van Persie and Cole for Arsenal, Ronaldo, Rooney and Keane for Manchester United – leaving Vieira with the opportunity to win the FA Cup for his team. Although Carroll guessed the correct way to dive, Vieira's kick was just out of his reach, giving Arsenal their 10th FA Cup.

=== Match details ===
21 May 2005
15:00 BST

Arsenal	0–0 (a.e.t.)	Manchester United
	Report
Penalties
Lauren (penalty scored); Ljungberg (penalty scored); Van Persie (penalty scored); Cole (penalty scored); Vieira (penalty scored)	5–4	(penalty scored) Van Nistelrooy; (penalty missed) Scholes; (penalty scored) Ronaldo; (penalty scored) Rooney; (penalty scored) Keane

Millennium Stadium, Cardiff
Attendance: 71,876
Referee: Rob Styles (Hampshire)

Arsenal	Manchester United

GK	1	(Germany) Jens Lehmann
RB	12	(Cameroon) Lauren	(yellow card) 59'
CB	28	(Ivory Coast) Kolo Touré
CB	20	(Switzerland) Philippe Senderos
LB	3	(England) Ashley Cole	(yellow card) 16'
CM	15	(Spain) Cesc Fàbregas		(substituted off) 86'
CM	4	(France) Patrick Vieira (c)	(yellow card) 118'
CM	19	(Brazil) Gilberto Silva
RW	7	(France) Robert Pires		(substituted off) 105'
LW	9	(Spain) José Antonio Reyes	(yellow card) 75' (yellow-red card) 120'
CF	10	(Netherlands) Dennis Bergkamp		(substituted off) 65'
Substitutes:
GK	24	(Spain) Manuel Almunia
DF	23	(England) Sol Campbell
MF	8	(Sweden) Freddie Ljungberg		(substituted on) 65'
MF	17	(Brazil) Edu		(substituted on) 105'
FW	11	(Netherlands) Robin van Persie		(substituted on) 86'
Manager:
(France) Arsène Wenger

GK	13	(Northern Ireland) Roy Carroll
RB	22	(Republic of Ireland) John O'Shea		(substituted off) 77'
CB	5	(England) Rio Ferdinand
CB	6	(England) Wes Brown
LB	27	(France) Mikaël Silvestre	(yellow card) 21'
RM	24	(Scotland) Darren Fletcher		(substituted off) 91'
CM	16	(Republic of Ireland) Roy Keane (c)
CM	18	(England) Paul Scholes	(yellow card) 112'
LM	7	(Portugal) Cristiano Ronaldo
SS	8	(England) Wayne Rooney
CF	10	(Netherlands) Ruud van Nistelrooy
Substitutes:
GK	1	(United States) Tim Howard
DF	2	(England) Gary Neville
DF	25	(South Africa) Quinton Fortune		(substituted on) 77'
MF	11	(Wales) Ryan Giggs		(substituted on) 91'
FW	14	(England) Alan Smith
Manager:
(Scotland) Sir Alex Ferguson

Match officials

- Assistant referees:
  - Jim Devine (North Yorkshire)
  - Paul Canadine (South Yorkshire)
- Fourth official: Neale Barry (Lincolnshire)

Man of the match

- Wayne Rooney (Manchester United)

Match rules

- 90 minutes.
- 30 minutes of extra-time if necessary.
- Penalty shootout if scores still level.
- Five substitutes named.
- Maximum of three substitutions.

=== Statistics ===
Statistic	Arsenal	Manchester United
Goals scored	0	0
Possession	56%	44%
Shots on target	1	8
Shots off target	4	12
Corner kicks	1	12
Offsides	3	6
Fouls	30	23
Yellow cards	3	1
Red cards	1	0

== Post-match ==
As the Arsenal players ran towards Vieira and Lehmann to celebrate, Ferguson and Keane were seen consoling various players and staff members. Mark Lawrenson, the BBC's co-commentator for the final, summarised to his counterpart John Motson: "Well, we must congratulate Arsenal on the way they took the penalties – they were excellent [...] But I have to say over the course of the 120 minutes, Manchester United have been mugged."

Wenger conceded his opponents were the better side, but praised his team's resolve, telling reporters: "It was important to score the first goal and with neither team scoring it remained tight for a long, long period. There were some times in the second half when we were a bit lucky but we defended very well and to keep a clean sheet is good." He admitted his players had practised taking penalties, but was quick to point out "you don't score because of the practising – keeping your nerve is more important." Lehmann, who had been side-lined by Wenger during the course of the season, credited his teammates for scoring all five penalties, and described it as a "big mental achievement". Cole called Arsenal's win a "...great team performance, we didn't have too many chances but we defended really well and battled really hard." Henry, who sat out the final due to injury expressed sympathy for Manchester United, and recollected a similar experience from his early Arsenal career: "I know how they feel because we lost against Liverpool and did not deserve to lose. If your name is on the cup you win it."

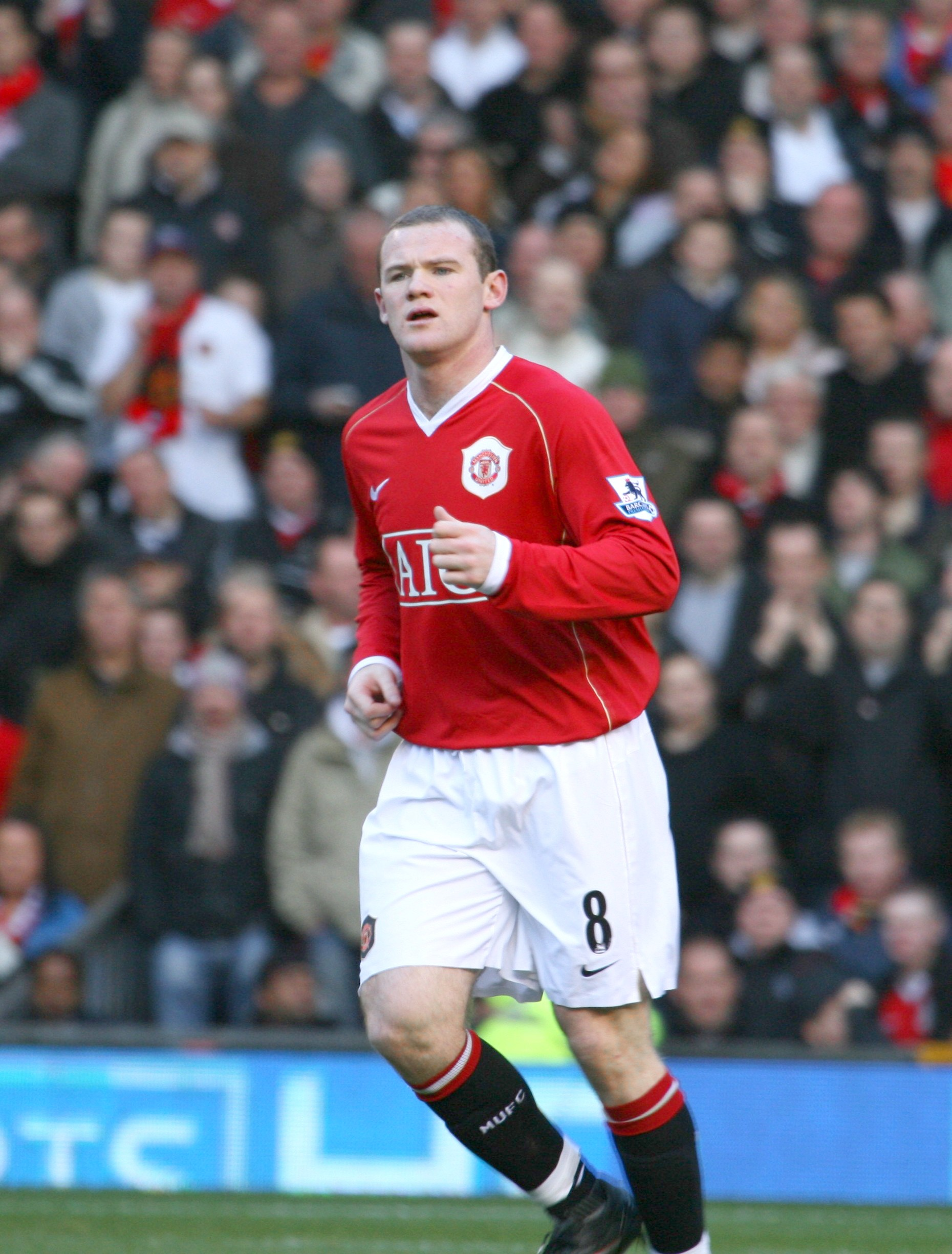
Wayne Rooney (pictured in 2006) was chosen as man of the match.

"The coach decided to change the system to 4–5–1. It was different. We used to win by scoring lots of goals, but this time we won by being strong mentally and defensively. The only way we were going to win this final was on penalties."

— Robert Pires, post match

Ferguson was proud of his team's performance, but admitted their failure throughout the season to convert chances into goals, had cost them once more. Of the game, he continued: "In cup football, you need a break and we didn't get one. We've had luck in the past, so you understand it can happen. It's not a nice experience but it's one you have to accept." Ferguson criticised the referee for failing to send Vieira off during extra-time as he fouled Rooney, and labelled Arsenal as "boring" for deploying negative tactics. Keane, like his manager, rued the missed opportunities and said it was a small consolation: "We dominated but I'm sure the Arsenal players won't be too bothered about that – they've got the winners' medals and the cup and we haven't."

Writing for The Daily Telegraph, pundit Alan Hansen felt the ease in which Manchester United dominated the final and Arsenal's inability to vary tactics highlighted why Wenger needed to make changes in the close season. Hansen agreed with Ferguson that United's lack of goal threat cost them on the day, but felt their future was rosier than Arsenal's. Nonetheless, he was of the opinion that Chelsea manager José Mourinho had little to be concerned about, concluding his piece with the sentence: "A London club did come away from Cardiff as big winners but it was not Arsenal, it was Chelsea." In the same newspaper, Paul Hayward praised the performances of Rooney and Ronaldo – "surely the best one-club pairing of under-21s in world football," while ex-Arsenal player Alan Smith noted his former club's win demonstrated how Wenger "for the first time, practically, in his nine-year Highbury tenure, had set up his side with the opposition in mind." Capturing United's sombre mood, The Times football correspondent Matt Dickinson wrote: "The black shirts turned out not to be in protest at Glazer but a reflection of their mood after the first FA Cup Final to be decided by a penalty shoot-out."

The match was broadcast live in the United Kingdom by both the BBC and Sky Sports, with BBC One providing the free-to-air coverage and Sky Sports 1 being the pay-TV alternative. BBC One held the majority of the viewership, with a peak audience of 12.8 million (67.1% viewing share), which made it the most-watched final in nine years. The match itself was watched by 10 million viewers (61%), and coverage of the final averaged at 7.3 million (50.5%). Viewing figures compiled by The Guardian showed the BBC's coverage was second only to ITV's broadcast of the 2005 UEFA Champions League Final between Liverpool and A.C. Milan, which amassed 13.9 million viewers. Global audience figures for the 2005 FA Cup Final totalled 484 million.

== Aftermath and legacy ==
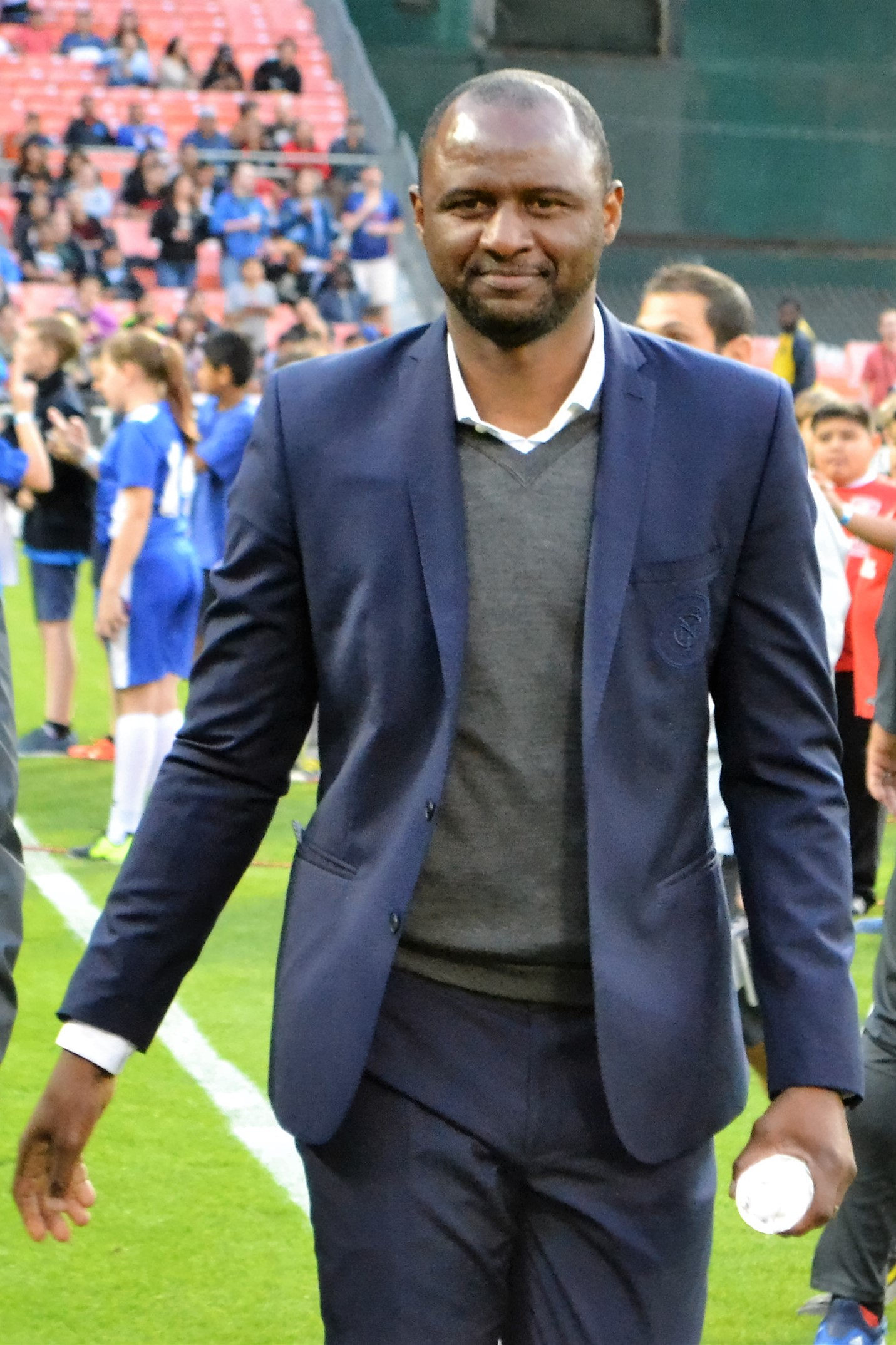
Patrick Vieira was sold to Juventus in the summer of 2005.

The 2005 final was Vieira's last match as an Arsenal player; he joined Juventus in the close season for a combined total fee of €20 million. Wenger's decision to sell his captain was made so the team could benefit from Fàbregas, who broke into the first eleven during the season. In later years, Wenger deviated from his usual counter-attacking style, and imposed a fluent system, with less emphasis on physicality. The immediate seasons after Arsenal relocated to the Emirates Stadium in 2006 saw Wenger sell several experienced players, and integrate more young talent, as a means of fostering an identity with the club. Financing for the stadium however meant Arsenal prioritised its expenditure instead of the squad and trophies. Though Wenger managed to solidify the club's position in the Premier League's top four and secure the necessary funds to pay back its debtors, the 2005 Cup win represented Arsenal's last silverware for nine years. In 2014, he led Arsenal to a record-equalling 11th FA Cup, and became the record equalling most successful manager in the competition's history a year later, as his side beat Aston Villa.

Like Arsenal, Manchester United endured a period of transition after the final. The Glazer's takeover of the club resulted in disaffected fans setting up F.C. United of Manchester, which, as of 2016, has become the largest supporter-owned football club in the United Kingdom. The 2005–06 season began poorly for Manchester United, as they were eliminated in the group stages of the Champions League and Ferguson was booed at after United's home loss to Blackburn Rovers. Journalist Henry Winter in December 2005 opined that Ferguson needed to resign, writing in his column: "Under Ferguson, United became football's answer to the Magic Circle. But the magic now drains away and so, next summer, must Ferguson." He stayed, however, and having already called time on Keane's career at United, he began reinvigorating his squad, by signing defenders Nemanja Vidić and Patrice Evra. United returned to the Millennium Stadium eight months after the FA Cup loss, and beat Wigan Athletic to win the 2006 Football League Cup Final. Ferguson guided his team to their first League title in four years the following season, after stern competition from Chelsea, and won a further 13 competitive honours until his retirement in 2013.

Kevin McCarra regards the final as a turning point in the rivalry between the two clubs: "...Arsenal and United, who could barely be prised apart in 2005, have since gone their separate ways. The signs of divergence were already apparent that afternoon." The match is considered an example of Wenger setting his team up pragmatically and going against his ideals. Having later asserted he would never use the 4–5–1 system again, Wenger adopted the formation for Champions League matches and his approach resulted in Arsenal reaching the 2006 UEFA Champions League Final.
