= Arsenal F.C.–Manchester United F.C. rivalry =

Rivalry between two English football clubs

Arsenal v Manchester United
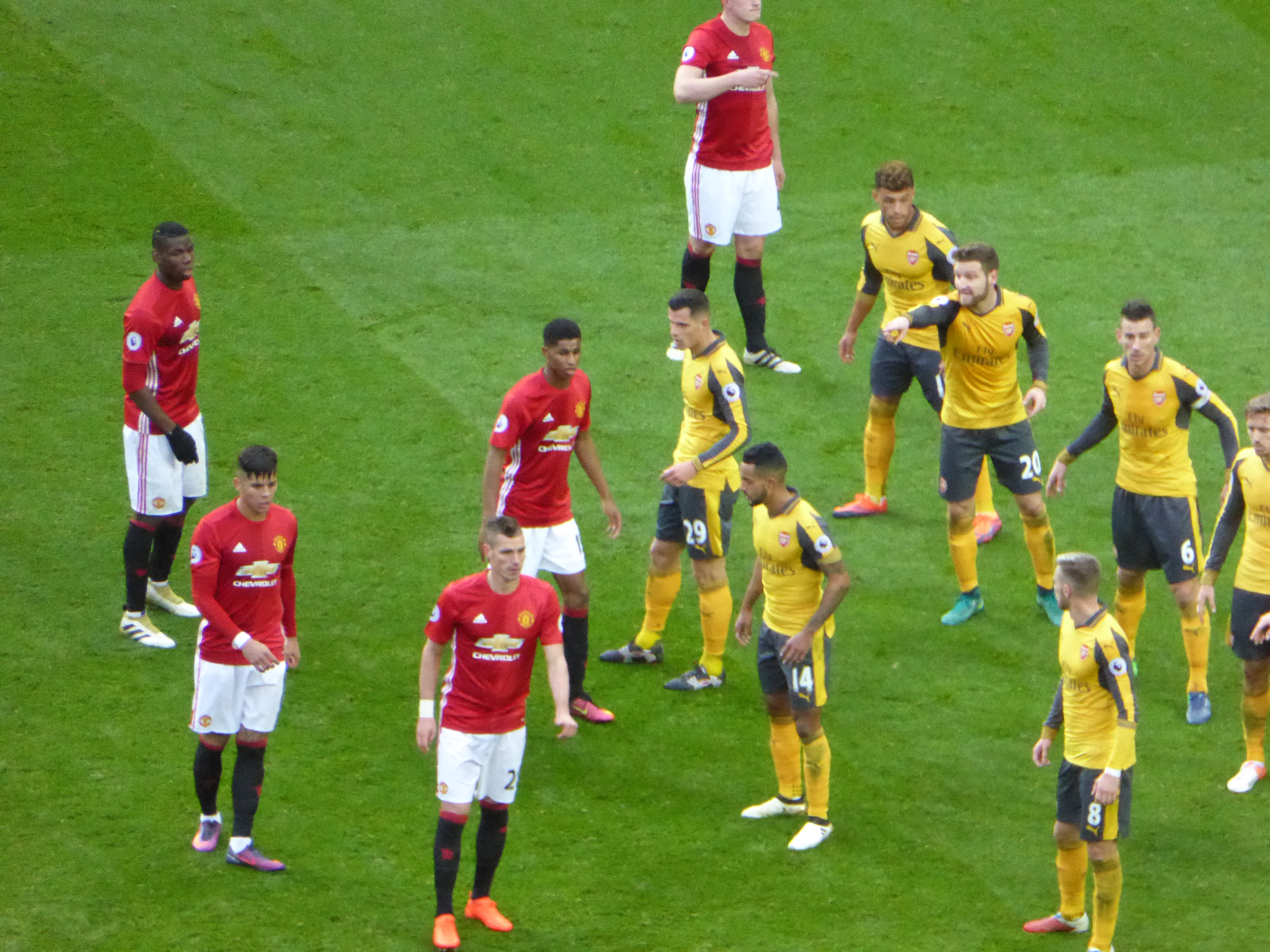
- United and Arsenal players prepare for a corner kick during a Premier League match on 19 November 2016.
- Teams: Arsenal; Manchester United
- First meeting: 13 October 1894; Second Division; Newton Heath 3–3 Woolwich Arsenal
- Latest meeting: 25 January 2026; Premier League; Arsenal 2–3 Manchester United
- Next meeting: 19 December 2026; Premier League; Arsenal v Manchester United
- Stadiums: Emirates Stadium (Arsenal); Old Trafford (Manchester United)

Statistics
- Total meetings: 246
- Most wins: Manchester United (100)
- Most player appearances: Ryan Giggs (50)
- Top scorer: Wayne Rooney (12)
- All-time series: Arsenal: 91; Drawn: 55; Manchester United: 100
- Largest victory: Manchester United 8–2 Arsenal; Premier League (28 August 2011)
- Largest goal scoring: Manchester United 8–2 Arsenal; Premier League; 28 August 2011
- Longest win streak: 5 games Manchester United (1983–1985)
- Longest unbeaten streak: 9 games Manchester United (1954–1958 and 1991–1995)
- Current win streak: 1 game Manchester United (2026–present)
- Current unbeaten streak: 1 game Manchester United (2026–present)

Although Arsenal and Manchester United have frequently been in the same division in English football since 1919, the rivalry between the two clubs only became a fierce one in the late 1990s and early 2000s, when the teams regularly competed against each other for the Premier League title and the FA Cup. There was also an enmity between the managers, Arsenal's Arsène Wenger (1996–2018) and United's Sir Alex Ferguson (1986–2013), as well as club captains Patrick Vieira and Roy Keane. Their contests often involved on-field trouble – seven red cards were shown in matches from February 1997 to February 2005. The league fixture in September 2003, known as the "Battle of Old Trafford", was marred by a mêlée instigated by Arsenal players, who felt striker Ruud van Nistelrooy had cheated to get Vieira sent off. A season later, Manchester United ended Arsenal's unbeaten run in controversial circumstances, which led to more disorder, this time in the tunnel.

By 2008, former Arsenal player Lee Dixon noted that the rivalry had diminished. Ferguson also stated that the two teams' meetings had cooled from their previous "heated" exchanges. Other factors for the diminishing importance of the rivalry in the 2010s were the ascendancy of other clubs, including local rivals of both (Chelsea, Tottenham Hotspur and Manchester City).

Arsenal and Manchester United first played a competitive match in October 1894; as of 25 January 2026, the clubs have faced each other 246 times, with United winning 100 games to Arsenal's 91, and 55 matches drawn. Wayne Rooney scored the most goals in the fixture (12), while Ryan Giggs made the highest number of appearances (50). Several players have featured for both clubs at different stages of their career, including Brian Kidd, Andy Cole, David Platt, Robin van Persie, Danny Welbeck, Alexis Sánchez and George Graham.

== History ==
=== Origins ===
A particularly memorable match between the two sides came on 1 February 1958, when they met in a league fixture at Highbury. It was the last league game that United played before the Munich air disaster five days later, which claimed the lives of eight of their players and saw two other players injured to such an extent that they never played again. United won the game 5–4, with goals from Tommy Taylor (twice), Duncan Edwards, Bobby Charlton and Dennis Viollet. Five of the United players who would lose their lives as a result of the crash took to the field in the game – captain and full-back Roger Byrne, right-half Eddie Colman, centre-half Mark Jones, left-half Edwards and centre-forward Taylor.

Another high-profile clash came more than 20 years later, in the final of the FA Cup on 12 May 1979. A capacity crowd saw Arsenal take a 2–0 lead in the first half thanks to goals from Brian Talbot and Frank Stapleton, and with just five minutes left on the clock their lead was still intact. Then, in the 86th minute, Gordon McQueen pulled a goal back for United, and two minutes later they equalised with a goal from Sammy McIlroy. However, barely a minute after United equalised, Arsenal's Alan Sunderland scored an 89th-minute goal to win the cup 3–2 for Arsenal.

Although Arsenal and Manchester United had previously contested many significant matches, Sir Alex Ferguson believed the rivalry started in January 1987 when David Rocastle was sent off for retaliating against a foul on Norman Whiteside. In October 1990, a brawl between both sides at Old Trafford resulted in both clubs being docked points in the 1990–91 First Division. The scuffle started when Arsenal's Anders Limpar, who scored the only goal of the game, contested for the ball with Manchester United defender Denis Irwin. Limpar's teammate Nigel Winterburn tackled Irwin, which prompted Brian McClair and Irwin to retaliate. Winterburn was pushed onto the advertising hoardings and all the players bar goalkeeper David Seaman partook in a 20-second mêlée. As well as a points deduction, both clubs fined several of their players, and in Arsenal's case, their manager too. Arsenal and United next faced each other at Highbury just over a month later in the Football League Cup fourth round. 19-year-old winger Lee Sharpe scored a hat-trick as United won the tie 6–2.

=== 1996–2003 ===
He has no experience of English football. He has come from Japan and now he is telling us how to organise our football. Unless you have been in the situation and had the experience, then he should keep his mouth shut – firmly shut.

— Alex Ferguson, speaking about Arsène Wenger in 1997.

The rivalry intensified following the arrival of Arsène Wenger in October 1996. The first meeting between Ferguson's United and Wenger's Arsenal took place at United's Old Trafford stadium on 16 November 1996. Arsenal went into the game unbeaten in 10 matches, but an own goal by Arsenal defender Nigel Winterburn gave United a 1–0 victory. An incident in the first half involving United goalkeeper Peter Schmeichel and Arsenal striker Ian Wright evoked memories of the 1990 brawl. The return fixture at Highbury, a 2–1 win for United, was again marred by an incident between Wright and Schmeichel; the striker challenged for the ball with both feet and caught the goalkeeper with his studs. A confrontation ensued and police stepped in to keep the players apart after the final whistle. It soon transpired the two incidents were linked, as Wright had accused Schmeichel of racially abusing him and the allegations were being criminally investigated. Speaking to Sky Sports, Ferguson firmly denied the allegations aimed at Schmeichel, and said the claims were a "slur" against the club. Wenger claimed Ferguson was speaking too much and should let the justices do their job, but was defensive of the tackle which Wright had made, saying there had been 30 worse tackles in the season. Wright's behaviour was scrutinised at a hearing, where he complained he was subject to racial abuse by Schmeichel, at which point the FA intervened and met with representatives of both clubs. In March, it was announced that Schmeichel would not face any charges for the allegations, and the pair were asked to make a public reconciliation, with Wright agreeable to the idea, but it wasn't until April that they agreed to settle their differences. The managers' animosity towards each other started to become apparent.

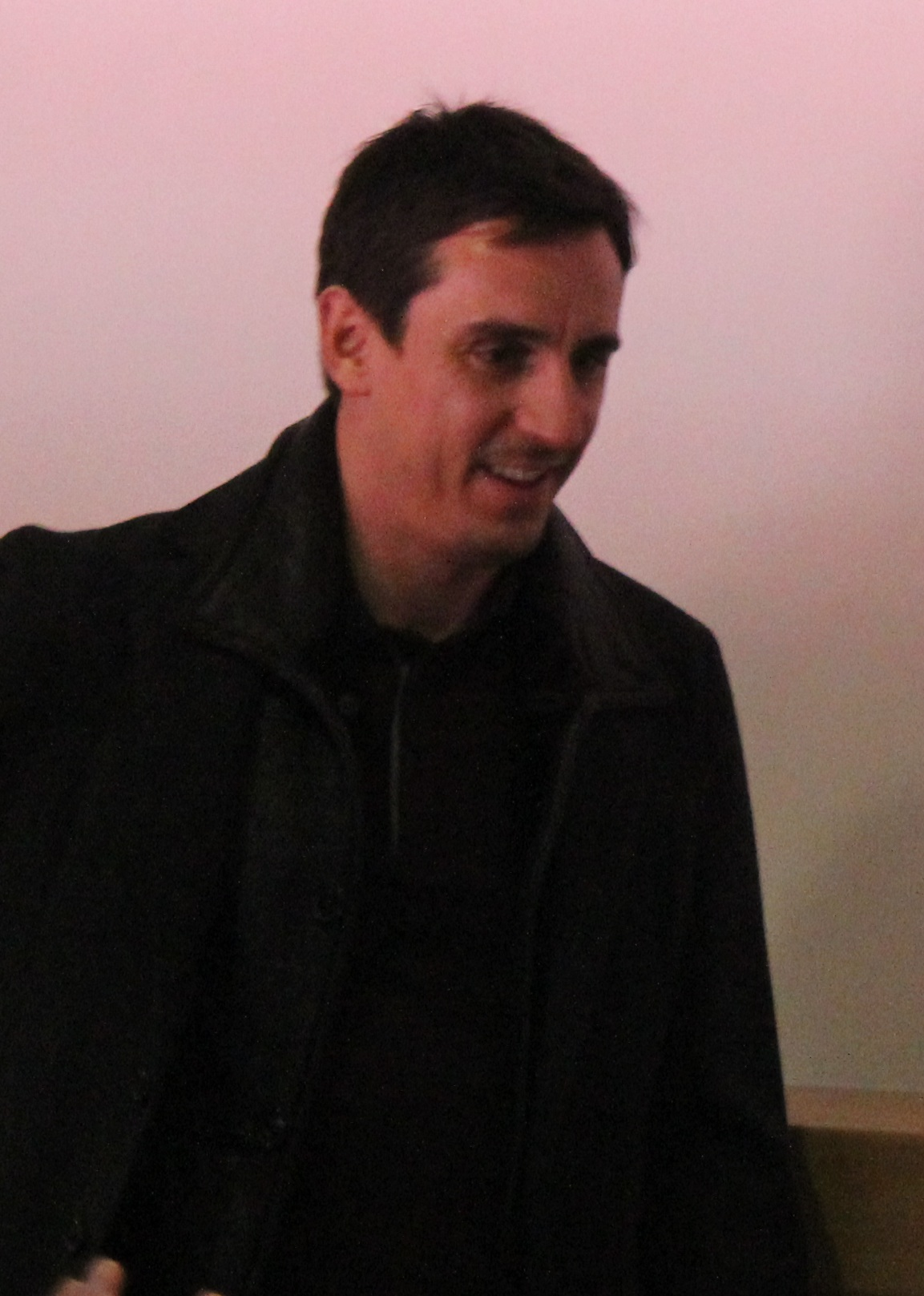
Gary Neville described Arsenal's 1998 side as "experienced and strong, both mentally and physically."

Wenger had advised against the Premier League extending the season to ease Manchester United's fixture congestion, to which Ferguson publicly retorted: "Maybe he should concentrate on Ian Wright's tackles rather than Manchester United. He's at a big club, well Arsenal used to be a big club, and maybe next year he could be in the same situation. I wonder what [h]is story will be then."

United had won four of the first five editions of the newly branded league, and were on course to continue their domination after opening up a sizeable lead in February 1998. Injuries and poor results however destabilised the team, and by the time Arsenal visited Old Trafford in March, a title race was looking probable. Wenger was bullish of his team's chances: "I told you last week that the race was not over when the bookmakers stopped betting. Surprise, surprise, they have started taking money again." A goal from Marc Overmars set Arsenal on the way to victory, which put them six points behind with three games in hand. They eventually won the league, and secured the double by beating Newcastle United in the FA Cup final.

"It was a trauma for us. I can still hear the shouts of their team having won, they couldn’t believe it because they were down to 10 men. And I think that put them on a wave of euphoria and then they won the title – just."

— Arsène Wenger reflecting on the FA Cup semi-final replay

Arsenal began the 1998–99 season with a 3–0 win over United in the Charity Shield; Ferguson was unconcerned by the result, but losing to the champions a month later by the same scoreline was, in his words, "a lot less tolerable." Both clubs again vied for domestic honours; United this time pipped Arsenal by a point to regain the title. They also met in the FA Cup semi-final, which was replayed after the original game ended goalless. David Beckham and Dennis Bergkamp scored for their respective clubs either side of half time, Roy Keane was dismissed, and the holders late on were awarded a penalty. Schmeichel saved Bergkamp's attempt and the tie went into extra time. Ryan Giggs memorably scored the winner, picking up possession on the halfway line and dribbling past the entire Arsenal back line before shooting past David Seaman. "A match that had everything finished with a pitch invasion, sporadic fighting and David Beckham carried shoulder-high from the field" wrote Matt Dickinson in The Times. United went on to complete the Treble, becoming the first English club to do so.

The rivalry continued into the new millennium, though Manchester United's domestic grip tightened. They finished 18 points clear of Arsenal in 1999–2000 and completed a hat-trick of titles the following season. Any indication United could be caught faded once Ferguson's team resoundingly beat Arsenal 6–1 in February 2001. Dwight Yorke scored a hat-trick, on a day Wenger fielded a relatively inexperienced centre-back pairing of Gilles Grimandi and Igors Stepanovs. At the end of the campaign, Ferguson announced his decision to retire. He reportedly sanctioned a bid to sign midfielder Patrick Vieira, who was upset at Arsenal's transfer inactivity. The transfer never came through; Wenger blamed his rivals for "...approach[ing] to Patrick without contacting us, and that does not really respect the rules." United made an indifferent start to the league campaign, and by February 2002, Ferguson went back on his retirement plan on the advice of his family. Arsenal hit their stride as the 2001–02 season came to a close, winning the double for the second time in four years. The championship was decided at Old Trafford in the penultimate game of the season; Wenger described his team's 1–0 win as a "shift of power."

"It's getting tickly now – squeaky-bum time, I call it."

— Sir Alex Ferguson on the title race, 2003

United again won the title back in 2002–03, when it looked as though Arsenal would retain it. A late-season encounter between the teams ended in controversial circumstances after the match officials allowed Thierry Henry's second goal to stand despite the player being offside and Sol Campbell was sent off for an elbow on Ole Gunnar Solskjær in a 2–2 draw. Arsenal had beaten United on the way to FA Cup success and both teams contested the 2003 FA Community Shield at the start of the 2003–04 season. In a hotly-contested match, Phil Neville was booked in the first minute for a challenge on Vieira and a minute later, Ashley Cole received a booking for fouling Solskjær. Yellow cards were also given to Quinton Fortune and Paul Scholes for United and Vieira for Arsenal. Substitute Francis Jeffers was shown a straight red for a kick on Phil Neville and, despite originally going unpunished, Campbell was later given a three-match ban by the FA for kicking out at Eric Djemba-Djemba. The game finished 1–1 after 90 minutes and United eventually won the Shield 4–3 on penalties.

=== 2003–04: Brawl and Cup semi-final meeting ===
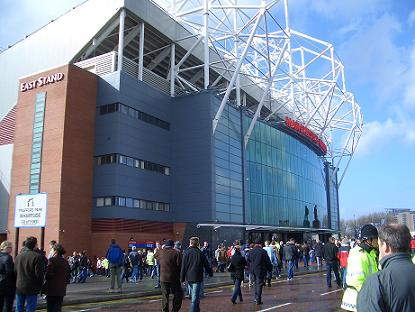
Old Trafford was the setting for another brawl between the two sides.

The rivalry escalated in September 2003, when Arsenal travelled to Old Trafford. In the match Vieira was shown a second yellow card for his part in an altercation with striker Ruud van Nistelrooy, and during stoppage time, defender Martin Keown brought down Diego Forlán in the Arsenal penalty area. United were awarded a penalty and Van Nistelrooy stepped up to take it, but his shot rebounded off the crossbar.

This was followed by scenes of jubilation from the Arsenal players, who confronted Van Nistelrooy after his miss and the resulting scuffle led to another fracas after the final whistle. The FA immediately took action, charging six of Arsenal's players (Jens Lehmann, Ray Parlour, Lauren, Cole, Keown and Vieira) with improper conduct. The club was fined £175,000, the largest ever given to a club by the FA at the time. Lauren received a four-game ban, whereas Vieira and Parlour were given one-match suspensions.

The next game between these two clubs was held at Highbury in March 2004, again ending in a draw following a late Louis Saha goal. The match marked the first time a team had ever started the season reaching 30 games without defeat.

Ferguson's side then knocked Arsenal out of the FA Cup semi-final at Villa Park the following weekend; United supporters at the ground led a chorus of "Where's your Treble gone?" to their rivals. United went on to win the FA Cup, while Arsenal regained the title without losing a league game. They faced each other in the 2004 FA Community Shield and Arsenal won the match 3–1.

=== 2004–05: Unbeaten run ends, tunnel fracas, Cup final shootout ===
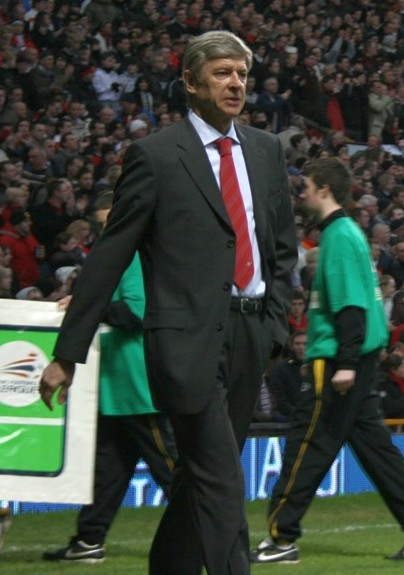
Arsène Wenger was highly critical of Mike Riley's performance, suggesting the referee was biased towards the home side.

By the time Arsenal next played Manchester United, the club had extended its unbeaten league run to 49 games. United stood in sixth place in the table, 11 points behind Arsenal and were intent on ending their rivals' undefeated streak. Ferguson in his press conference described Arsenal's conduct in the equivalent fixture a year ago as "...the worst thing I've seen in this sport. No wonder they were so delighted at the verdicts."

The October 2004 league match, staged at Old Trafford, was blighted by a number of fouls, overlooked by referee Mike Riley, including striker Van Nistelrooy's studs-up challenge on Cole. Arsenal dictated much of the play, but as the game headed towards the finish, United threatened. The home side were awarded a penalty when Wayne Rooney was adjudged to have been fouled in the area by Campbell. Van Nistelrooy scored and late in the game Rooney scored to give United a 2–0 win. Tempers flared in the tunnel afterwards; Wenger confronted Van Nistelrooy for his tackle on Cole, but Ferguson intervened and told him to leave his players alone. Pizza was thrown at Ferguson by an Arsenal player, which forced him to change into the club tracksuit in order to carry out his television duties. An investigation into "Pizzagate" never came around as both clubs kept silent.

The clubs met again five weeks later in the League Cup quarter-finals at Old Trafford and despite both sides fielding weakened teams, the match was not short of drama. David Bellion gave United the lead in just 19 seconds, but tempers boiled over in the second half; a late tackle by Robin van Persie on Kieran Richardson resulted in a fracas between both sets of players, which concluded with both protagonists getting booked by referee Mark Halsey. The game finished 1–0.

In the reverse league fixture, club captains Keane and Vieira had to be separated in the tunnel before the match by referee Graham Poll. Keane accused the Arsenal midfielder of intimidating his teammate Gary Neville, telling the press afterwards: "I said, 'Come and have a go at me'. Simple as that. If he wants to intimidate some of my team-mates then let's have a go at some of the other players. I think Gary Neville's an easy target. I wasn't having it." Vieira gave Arsenal the lead in the eighth minute of the match but 10-man United ran out 4–2 winners.

In May 2005, Arsenal and United contested the 124th FA Cup final. It was the first time in the competition's history that the final was decided by a penalty shoot-out. Arsenal beat United 5–4, following a goalless draw after extra time. Arsenal forward José Antonio Reyes became the second player in Cup final history to be sent off, following his second yellow card near the end of extra time.

=== 2005–2018 ===
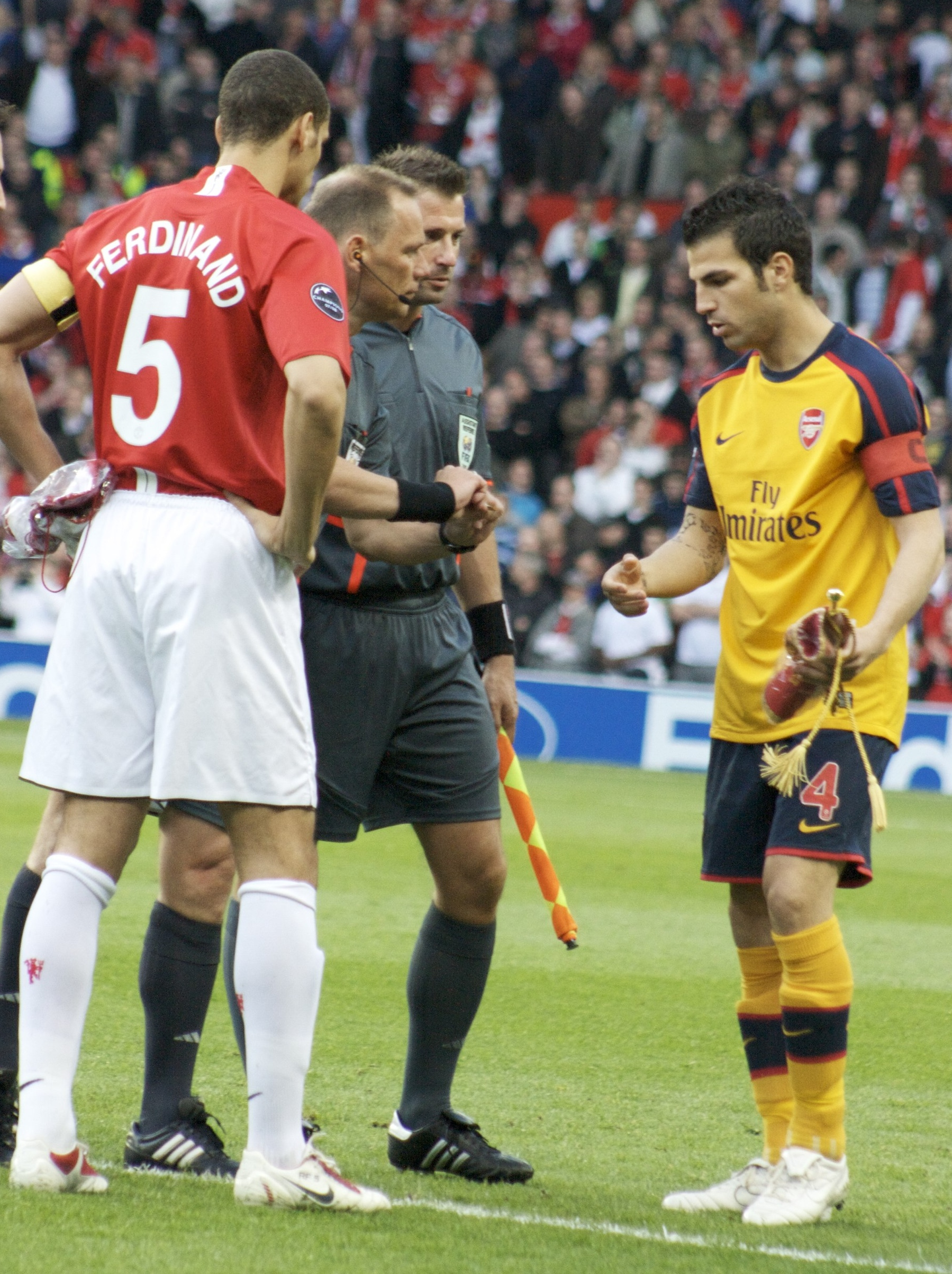
Rio Ferdinand and Cesc Fàbregas in discussion with the referee before the first European game between the two sides in April 2009.

Chelsea's emergence as title challengers put an end to Arsenal and Manchester United's domestic duopoly. The West London club won back-to-back league titles in 2004–05 and 2005–06 under José Mourinho, at a time when Arsenal and United underwent a period of transition. Vieira and Keane had left their respective clubs by the end of 2005, while Ferguson came under intense scrutiny over his management. Nevertheless, he guided his team to Premier League success in 2006–07, and won a further four league titles. At Arsenal, Wenger oversaw the club's relocation to the Emirates Stadium and made the decision to prioritise it over strengthening the squad. The club sold several experienced players, replenishing them with younger talent. The 2005 FA Cup win was their last piece of silverware until 2014.

Though the rivalry cooled, the two clubs were still involved in engrossing battles; The Guardian's Jamie Jackson wrote after a November 2007 fixture: "For once here was enough spectacle to meet the pre-match hype and convince the millions watching around the world that the Premier League may just have the best footballers who can play the very best stuff." In 2009, the teams met in the semi-finals of the 2008–09 UEFA Champions League, which United won 4–1 on aggregate. United defender Patrice Evra was blunt in his post-match assessment: "It was 11 men against 11 children. We never doubted ourselves. We have much more experience and that's what made the difference." Wenger described it as the most disappointing night of his career, and said the response from Arsenal fans made him feel as though he had "killed someone".

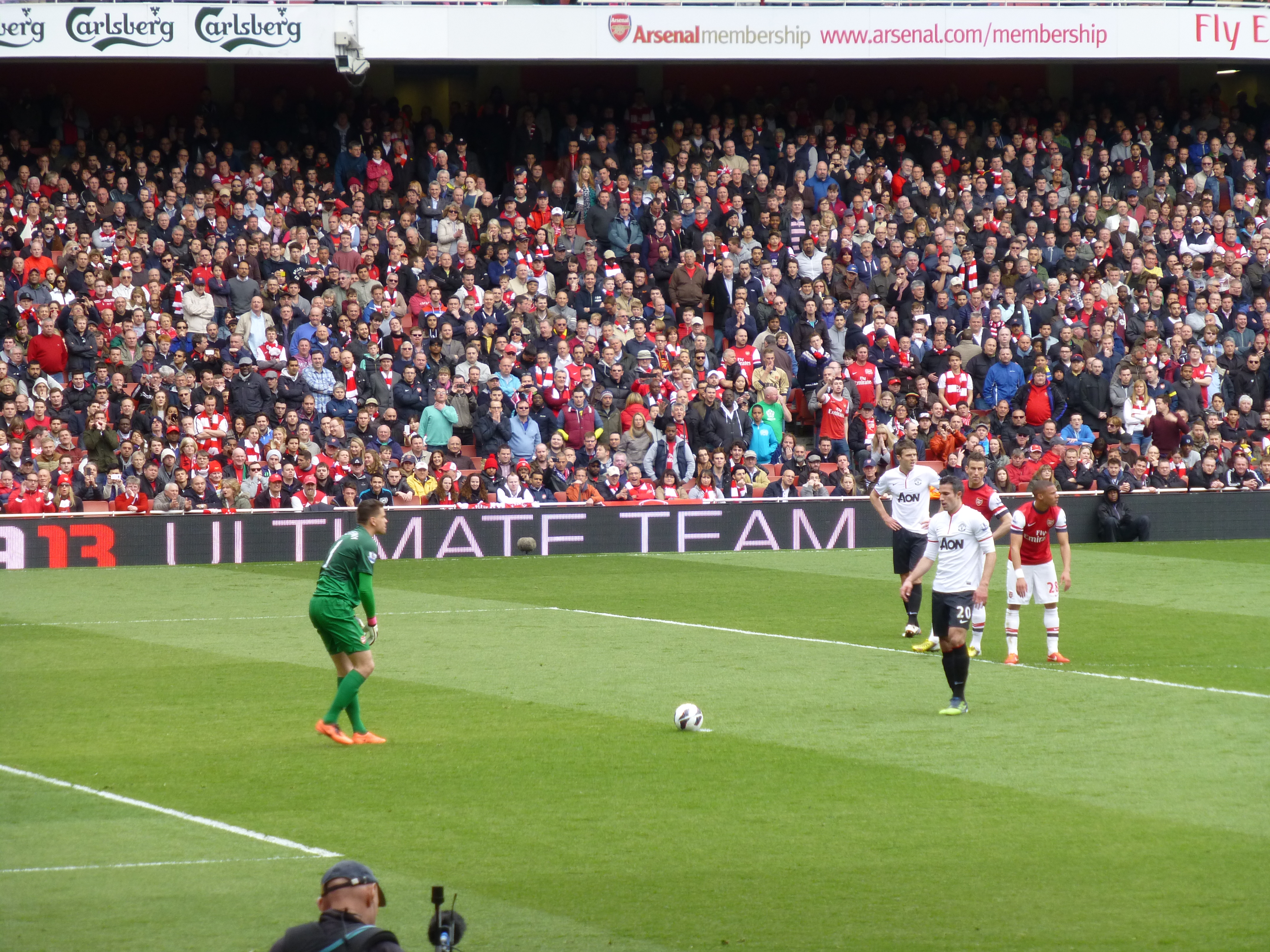
Robin van Persie about to take a penalty against his former side, April 2013

Later that month, a 0–0 draw was enough to give United a third consecutive league title, equalling Liverpool's record of 18. Wenger paid his respects to Ferguson, saying that it was "remarkable to have such a consistent motivation at that level – and deal with the stress and all the other ingredients", and declared United worthy champions.

In August of the following season, the two teams met at Old Trafford, with United coming from behind to win 2–1. Towards the end of the game, Arsenal had a goal ruled out for offside, causing Wenger to lash out and angrily kick a water bottle before being sent off by referee Mike Dean; Wenger climbed on top of the dugout area, where he received chants of "sit down you paedophile" from United fans. The incident resulted in an apology from referee's chief Keith Hackett, while United chief executive David Gill raised the issue with a group of influential supporters.

In December 2010, Ferguson made a personal plea to the United fans to no longer sing the "sick" chant at Wenger, as those kind of chants from fans were considered an embarrassment to the club. With both teams going for the Premier League title in May 2011, Arsenal won their first game against Manchester United since November 2008, to leave United just three points ahead of Chelsea and six ahead of Arsenal going into the final three games of the season. Nevertheless, United won the league, nine points ahead of Chelsea and 12 points ahead of Arsenal.

In August 2011, Arsenal suffered their heaviest league defeat in 84 years as they lost 8–2 to Manchester United at Old Trafford. Arsenal had not lost a league game by such a margin since 1927 when they lost 7–0 to West Ham United in the old Football League First Division. This was also the first time they had conceded eight goals in a game since 1896, when they lost 8–0 to the now defunct Loughborough in the old Football League Second Division. A year later, striker Robin van Persie joined United, having stated that he would not renew his contract with Arsenal. It was speculated that he would move to a club overseas, but signed for the Manchester club, the first Arsenal player to do so since Viv Anderson in 1987. Ferguson called Wenger to push through a deal when he learnt of the contract situation. Van Persie was instrumental in United's league win of 2012–13 – Ferguson's last, and coincidentally received a guard of honour by his former teammates before United faced Arsenal at the Emirates in April 2013.

The appointment of Mourinho as United manager in 2016 added a new twist to the rivalry, given the previous animosity between him and Wenger. Sports writer Daniel Taylor however argued that Wenger's stagnation hindered any confrontations between the two managers, writing: "Ferguson stopped aiming his barbs at Wenger once it became clear his old enemy was no longer capable of producing title-winning teams and it doesn’t feel like a coincidence that Mourinho also seems indifferent now that Arsenal have dropped even further back." Former midfielder Phil Neville criticised the players for hugging in the tunnel before a league fixture in May 2017, calling the pleasantries a "total nonsense". In December 2017 analysts calculated the league fixture between the two sides as the Premier League's first billion pound game.

The swap deal of Arsenal’s Alexis Sánchez and United’s Henrikh Mkhitaryan during January 2018 brought about fellness to the rivalry and is one of the most infamous transfer deals in English football history. Ahead of Wenger's last game against United in April 2018, Channel 5 aired an hour-long documentary titled "The Feud", described in a review by The Guardian as "exhilarating". In the build-up to the game, Ferguson paid tribute to Wenger, saying he had always respected him in spite of the rivalry, and that the two clubs had "made the Premier League". United fans gave Wenger a standing ovation prior to the game at Old Trafford, which ended in a 2–1 defeat through a last-minute goal from Marouane Fellaini, a result described as "cruel yet predictable"; Arsenal had won one game in 15 years as the away team in the fixture.

== Ferguson and Wenger ==
It was not until Wenger's arrival in October 1996 that Arsenal reemerged as a serious league competitor. By the end of the 1996–1997 season, Manchester United amassed their fourth title in five seasons, whereas Arsenal finished the campaign in third – their highest position since the formation of the Premier League in 1992. During the season, Wenger commented on rule changes which permitted an extension to the league calendar: "It's wrong the programme is extended so Manchester United can rest and win everything." His observation irked Ferguson, who replied: "He has no experience of English football. He has come here from Japan, and now he is telling everyone how to organise our football. Unless you have been in the situation and had the experience then he should keep his mouth shut, firmly shut."

The relationship between both managers was evidently hostile to begin with. Ferguson noted that Wenger was the only manager he came across in the league not to share a drink with after matches – an English football "tradition". In 2009, Wenger said his discourtesy was mistaken for mistrust and managers "cannot be completely friendly and open up." When asked if this was the reason he avoided the post-match drink, he replied: "Most of the time, yes. What can you say if you have won? And if you have lost all you want to do is get home and prepare for the next game."

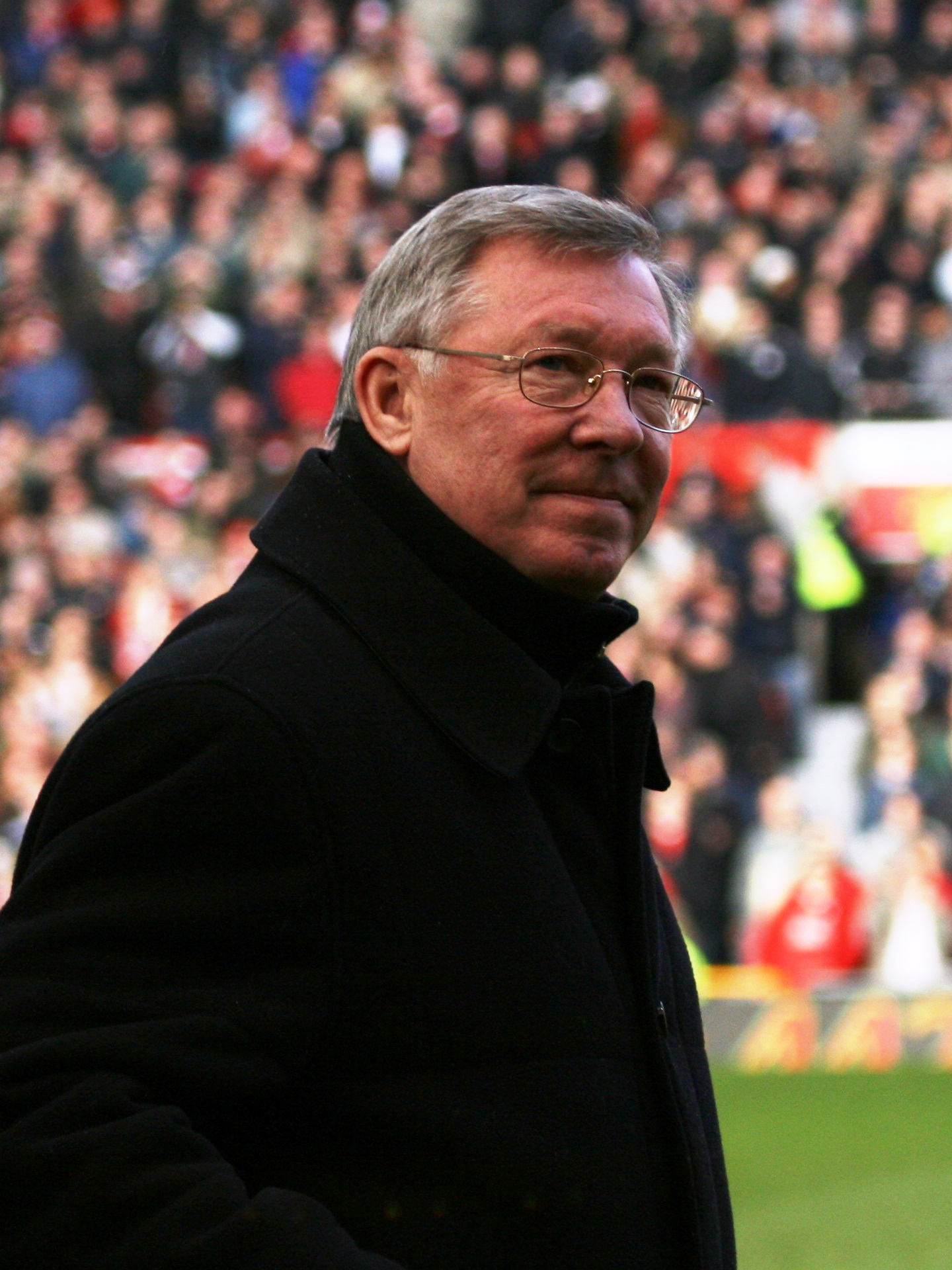
Sir Alex Ferguson's relationship with Arsène Wenger turned cordial in later years.

In January 2005, Ferguson and Wenger were embroiled in a new row over what had happened in the tunnel after Pizzagate. Ferguson alleged that Wenger called his players "cheats" and never apologised for his team's behaviour: "It's a disgrace, but I don't expect Wenger to ever apologise, he's that type of person." Wenger then claimed Ferguson was guilty of bringing the game into disrepute; he told reporters that he "will never answer any questions any more about this man," but went further to question the motive of the press: "What I don't understand is that he does what he wants and you are all at his feet." Both managers came under pressure from the Metropolitan Police Service, then Sports Minister Richard Caborn and Premier League chairman Richard Scudamore to put an end to the bickering. Ferguson and Wenger agreed to tone down their words, in an attempt to defuse the rivalry. In later years, Ferguson said Arsenal's defeat "scrambled Arsène’s brain" and caused their relationship to breakdown for almost five years.

The two managers have "exchanged some of football's best and bitterest verbal swipes," according to The Daily Telegraph. In 1997, Ferguson called Wenger a "novice" for complaining about the fixture programme and later said of his linguistic skills: "They say he’s an intelligent man, right? Speaks five languages! I've got a 15-year-old boy from the Ivory Coast who speaks five languages!" After Arsenal's defeat to Manchester United in February 1997 – a match marred by a bust up between Wright and Schmeichel, Wenger referred to Ferguson's interference: "I was surprised to see Ferguson on the pitch because you can only play eleven." When Ferguson asserted that his team played the best football in England during the 2001–02 season, Wenger quipped: "Everyone thinks they have the prettiest wife at home," a remark that Ferguson initially suspected was a taunt at his own wife Cathy.

Such was the media's fascination of both managers' insults towards one another, psychologists were brought in to read and contrast their personalities. John Kramer, a sports psychologist suggested in 2004 that Ferguson and Wenger used their rivalry in order to relax before an important match. To him, Ferguson was "...the past master in terms of creating an environment of keeping his players hungry" by using a persecution complex; Wenger on the other hand diffuses the psychology and would rather "...tell his players they are all superb and will attempt to create an environment where they are able to show off their skills without the rest of it." Kramer concluded that both managers' comments "add[s] to the drama", but was insignificant in the games between the two clubs.

Ferguson in his autobiography said a major turning point in his relationship with Wenger was after the Champions League semi-final of 2009; the Arsenal manager invited his competitor into the dressing room and congratulated him on United's win. Wenger said their relationship had become genial since his team stopped competing with Manchester United for trophies. The move to the Emirates Stadium in 2006 is often cited as the reason why, given it coincided with a transitional phase for the club. Several experienced first teamers were displaced in favour of youth and the style of football became shifted more towards ball retention. Ferguson assessed the change in philosophy proved that Wenger did not "like to blend them too much with older players;" he also felt the team lacked a much needed balance between attack and defence.

== Television and radio broadcasts ==
The growth of the rivalry during the 1990s attracted the attention of broadcasters and has led to fixtures being rescheduled from the 3 pm blackout period to primetime viewing in the United Kingdom. League matches are often broadcast on Sky Sports – once as early as 11:15 am, while cup games have aired on mainstream channels, BBC One and ITV. At the height of the rivalry, the games on Sky had been billed as title deciders, and play was summarised by Martin Tyler and Andy Gray. The April 2003 match at Highbury, advertised as "Face Off", was seen by a British audience of 3.4 million, while the 2005 FA Cup final was watched by more than 480 million viewers worldwide.

In August 1999, the two sides participated in the world's first interactive football match, and 11 years later featured in the world's first 3D TV sports broadcast – both events trialled by Sky. To commemorate the 80th anniversary of the first radio football commentary, the BBC reintroduced its "grid system" to help listeners visualise the action between Arsenal and Manchester United in January 2007. Musician David Gray was enlisted as guest summariser, with John Murray describing the action and James Alexander Gordon calling out the grid numbers to explain where the ball was.

The rivalry was explored in an ITV4 special, Keane & Vieira: Best of Enemies, first broadcast in December 2013. The documentary saw the former captains discussing about their relationship, views on their respective managers and what they thought of each other.

== Footballers who have played for both clubs ==
Arsenal, then Manchester United

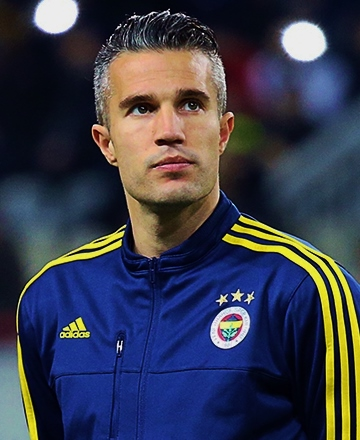
Robin van Persie moved from Arsenal to Manchester United in August 2012.

Player	Pos.	Arsenal	Manchester United
(Scotland) David Herd	FW	1954–1961	1961–1968
(Scotland) Ian Ure	MF	1963–1969	1969–1971
(Scotland) George Graham	FW	1966–1972	1972–1974
(Republic of Ireland) Frank Stapleton	FW	1971–1981	1981–1987
(England) Viv Anderson	DF	1984–1987	1987–1991
(England) Andy Cole	FW	1989–1992	1995–2001
(Netherlands) Robin van Persie	FW	2004–2012	2012–2015
(Chile) Alexis Sánchez	FW	2014–2018	2018–2020
(England) Ayden Heaven	DF	2024–2025	2025–present

Manchester United, then Arsenal

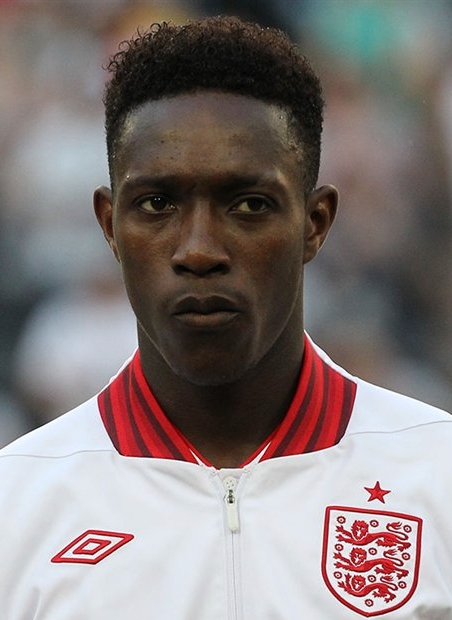
Danny Welbeck moved from Manchester United to Arsenal in September 2014.

Player	Pos.	Manchester United	Arsenal
(Republic of Ireland) Paddy Sloan	FW	1937–1939	1946–1948
(England) Jimmy Rimmer	GK	1965–1974	1974–1977
(England) Brian Kidd	FW	1967–1974	1974–1976
(Scotland) Jim Leighton	GK	1988–1991	1991
(England) David Platt	MF	1982–1985	1995–1998
(France) Mikaël Silvestre	DF	1999–2008	2008–2010
(England) Danny Welbeck	FW	2008–2014	2014–2019
(Armenia) Henrikh Mkhitaryan	FW	2016–2018	2018–2020

Note: David Platt never played a senior game for United, Jim Leighton never played a senior game for Arsenal.

== Statistics ==
=== Honours ===
As of 16 August 2026

- Numbers with this background denote club holds record in the competition.

Arsenal	Competition	Manchester United
Domestic
14	Football League / Premier League	20
14	FA Cup	13
2	League Cup	6
18	FA Charity Shield / FA Community Shield	21
1	Football League Centenary Trophy	0
49	Domestic total	60
European
—	European Cup / UEFA Champions League	3
1	UEFA Cup Winners' Cup (defunct)	1
—	UEFA Cup / UEFA Europa League	1
—	European Super Cup / UEFA Super Cup	1
1	Inter-Cities Fairs Cup (defunct)	—
2	European total	6
Worldwide
—	Intercontinental Cup (defunct)	1
—	FIFA Club World Cup	1
—	Worldwide total	2
51	Total aggregate	68

=== Head-to-head ===
As of 25 January 2026

Competition	Played	Arsenal wins	Drawn	Manchester United wins	Arsenal goals	Manchester United goals
Football League/Premier League	214	78	50	86	301	319
FA Cup	17	6	3	8	21	23
Football League Cup / EFL Cup	6	2	0	4	12	15
Football League Centenary Trophy	1	1	0	0	2	1
FA Charity Shield / FA Community Shield	6	4	0	2	14	7
UEFA Champions League	2	0	0	2	1	4
Total	246	91	55	100	351	369

=== Top goalscorers ===
As of 25 January 2026

Player	Club	League	FA Cup	EFL Cup	Community Shield	Champions League	Total
(England) Wayne Rooney	Manchester United	9	3	0	0	0	12
(Scotland) David Herd	Arsenal (7); Manchester United (4)	11	0	0	0	0	11
(England) Jack Rowley	Manchester United	9	0	0	1	0	10
(France) Thierry Henry	Arsenal	8	0	0	1	0	9
(Portugal) Cristiano Ronaldo	Manchester United	7	0	0	0	2	9
(Scotland) Denis Law	Manchester United	8	0	0	0	0	8
(England) Mark Hughes	Manchester United	6	0	1	1	0	8
(England) Jimmy Brain	Arsenal	7	0	0	0	0	7
(England) Malcolm Macdonald	Arsenal	5	0	2	0	0	7
(England) Stan Pearson	Manchester United	6	1	0	0	0	7
(Netherlands) Robin van Persie	Arsenal (4); Manchester United (3)	6	0	0	0	1	7
(England) John Radford	Arsenal	7	0	0	0	0	7
(England) Joe Spence	Manchester United	7	0	0	0	0	7
(England) Tommy Taylor	Manchester United	7	0	0	0	0	7
Leading current players
(England) Marcus Rashford	Manchester United	6	0	0	0	0	6
(England) Bukayo Saka	Arsenal	3	0	0	0	0	3

=== Most appearances ===
As of 25 January 2026

Apps	Player	Club
50	Ryan Giggs	Manchester United
33	Tony Adams	Arsenal
31	Paul Scholes	Manchester United
30	Lee Dixon	Arsenal
30	Gary Neville	Manchester United
30	David O'Leary	Arsenal
30	Wayne Rooney	Manchester United
29	Bobby Charlton	Manchester United
29	Nigel Winterburn	Arsenal
28	Bill Foulkes	Manchester United

=== Hat-tricks ===
Eleven players have scored a hat-trick in a competitive match between Arsenal and Manchester United.

Player	For	Score	Date	Competition	Stadium
(Scotland) Bill White	Arsenal	5–1 (H)	3 December 1898	1898–99 Second Division	Manor Ground
(Scotland) Sandy Turnbull^{4}	Manchester United	4–2 (H)	23 November 1907	1907–08 First Division	Bank Street
(England) Ronnie Rooke	Arsenal	6–2 (H)	1 February 1947	1946–47 First Division	Highbury
(England) Jack Rowley	Manchester United	6–1 (H)	26 April 1952	1952–53 First Division	Old Trafford
(England) Jimmy Bloomfield	Arsenal	5–2 (H)	23 April 1960	1959–60 First Division	Highbury
(England) John Radford	Arsenal	4–0 (H)	22 August 1970	1970–71 First Division	Highbury
(England) Lee Sharpe	Manchester United	6–1 (A)	28 November 1990	1990–91 Football League Cup	Highbury
(England) Alan Smith	Arsenal	3–1 (H)	6 May 1991	1990–91 First Division	Highbury
(Trinidad and Tobago) Dwight Yorke	Manchester United	6–1 (H)	25 February 2001	2000–01 Premier League	Old Trafford
(France) Sylvain Wiltord	Arsenal	4–0 (H)	5 November 2001	2001–02 Football League Cup	Highbury
(England) Wayne Rooney	Manchester United	8–2 (H)	28 August 2011	2011–12 Premier League	Old Trafford

Note: ^{4} – player scored 4 goals; (H) – Home; (A) – Away

=== Records ===
- First competitive meeting: Newton Heath 3–3 Woolwich Arsenal – Second Division, 13 October 1894
- First FA Cup meeting: Manchester United 2–3 Arsenal – Fourth round, 10 March 1906
- First Community Shield meeting: Arsenal 4–3 Manchester United – 6 October 1948
- First League Cup meeting: Arsenal 3–2 Manchester United – Second round, 30 August 1977
- First European meeting: Manchester United 1–0 Arsenal – UEFA Champions League semi-final, 6 April 2009
- First away victory:
  - Arsenal: Manchester United 0–1 Arsenal – Second Division, 15 March 1902
  - Manchester United: Arsenal 0–2 Manchester United – Second Division, 3 April 1897
- Highest scoring game: Manchester United 8–2 Arsenal – Premier League, 28 August 2011
- Largest winning margin:
  - Arsenal: 5–0 – FA Cup fourth round, 30 January 1937
  - Manchester United: 8–2 – Premier League, 28 August 2011
- Most consecutive wins:
  - Arsenal: 4 (9 November 1997 – 20 September 1998, 22 January 2023 – 4 December 2024)
  - Manchester United: 5 (6 September 1983 – 24 August 1985)
- Longest undefeated run:
  - Arsenal: 7 (22 January 2023 – 17 August 2025; 5 wins and 2 draws)
  - Manchester United: 9 (20 November 1954 – 11 October 1958; 6 wins and 3 draws; 19 October 1991 – 22 March 1995; 3 wins and 6 draws)
- Most consecutive draws: 4 – 16 April 2003 to 28 March 2004
- Most meetings in a season: 5 – 1998–99 and 2004–05
- Most goals: 12 – Wayne Rooney (Manchester United)
- Most appearances: 50 – Ryan Giggs (Manchester United)
- Highest league attendance: 83,260 at Maine Road, First Division, 17 January 1948

== See also ==
- List of sports rivalries in the United Kingdom
