= British Sports Journalism Awards winners for Specialist Correspondent of the Year =

The British Sports Journalism Awards are given annually in a number of categories. The category "Specialist Correspondent of the Year" is awarded for sports writing. From 2016, it excluded football, cricket and rugby union correspondents, who had their own separate categories. Records date back to 2005.

== Specialist Correspondent of the Year winners ==
- 2018: tbc
- 2017: Sean Ingle – The Guardian and Observer
- 2016: Sean Ingle – The Guardian and Observer
- 2015: Alastair Down – Racing Post
- 2014: Paul Mahoney – Freelance
- 2013: Henry Winter – The Telegraph
- 2012: Michael Atherton – The Times
- 2011: Michael Atherton – The Times
- 2010: Henry Winter – The Telegraph
- 2009: Henry Winter – The Telegraph
- 2008: Michael Atherton – The Times
- 2007: Kevin Garside – The Telegraph
- 2006: Doug Gillon – The Herald
- 2005: Matt Dickinson – The Times
