= British Sports Journalism Awards winners for Young Sports Writer =

The British Sports Journalism Awards are given annually in a number of categories. The category "Young Sports Writer of the Year" is part of the awards for sports writing and has been awarded since 2007. There was no shortlist in 2018.

== Young Sports Writer of the Year Winners ==
- 2018: Daniel Matthews, The Daily Mail and MailOnline
- 2017: Adam Crafton, The Daily Mail and MailOnline
- 2016: Sam Dean, The Daily Telegraph
- 2015: Daniel Johnson, The Daily Telegraph
- 2014: James Gheerbrant, The Times and BBC
- 2013: Jack Pitt-Brooke, The Independent
- 2012: Martha Kelner, The Mail on Sunday
- 2011: Jonathan Liew, The Daily Telegraph
- 2010: Oliver Brown, The Daily Telegraph
- 2009: Oliver Brown, The Daily Telegraph
- 2008: Emma John, Observer Sport Monthly
- 2007: Oliver Brown, The Daily Telegraph
