= Matt Lawton (journalist) =

English sports journalist

- Born: 12 April 1970 (age 56)
- Education: Loughborough University
- Occupation: Sports Journalist
- Employer: The Times
- Awards: Sports News Reporter of the Year, Sports Journalist of the Year

Matt Lawton (born 12 April 1970) is an English sports journalist who is currently the chief sports correspondent for The Times newspaper. He was previously the chief sports reporter for the Daily Mail.

== Education ==
Lawton was educated at Loughborough University and City, University of London.

== Career ==
Lawton started his career at the Western Daily Press in 1993 before joining the Daily Express and then The Daily Telegraph. He moved to the Daily Mail in 2002 and was chief football correspondent and executive sport editor before becoming chief sports reporter. In September 2019 he joined The Times.

Lawton was named Sports News Reporter of the Year at the British Sports Journalism Awards in 2014, 2015, 2016 and 2017, Sports Journalist of the Year at the British Press Awards in 2015, and Sports Journalist of the Year at the British Journalism Awards in 2016 and 2020.

In 2021, with little else to do, Lawton began covering the Brentford Fans Civil War, including an article in which he revealed that a Brentford fan had received ‘excrement’ through the post after being accused of grassing on banned supporters.
