= 2004–05 FA Cup =

Tournament details
- Country: England; Wales

Final positions
- Champions: Arsenal (10th title)
- Runners-up: Manchester United

Tournament statistics
- Top goal scorer(s): Cristiano Ronaldo (4 goals)

The 2004–05 FA Cup was the 124th season of the world's oldest football competition, the FA Cup. The competition began on 28 August 2004, with the lowest-ranked of the entrants competing in the Extra preliminary round. For England's top 44 clubs, from the 2004–05 Premier League and 2004–05 Football League Championship, the FA Cup began at the third round in January.

Ties were all single-legged and took place at the stadium of the club drawn first. If scores were level at the end of a match, the match was replayed at the away club's stadium, usually in the middle of the following week. If the scores are still level, extra-time and penalties (if necessary) are used to determine a winner. From the semi-finals onwards, the ties take place at a neutral stadium, and there are no replays. That is to say, extra-time and penalties are played if necessary to determine a winner in a single match.

The new Wembley Stadium was still at least a year away from being ready for use, so the final was staged at the Millennium Stadium, Cardiff on 21 May 2005. The final was won by Arsenal on penalties after a goalless draw with holders Manchester United, the first time that the FA Cup final had been decided on penalties.

== Calendar ==
Round	Date	Matches	Clubs	Prize money
Extra preliminary round	28 August 2004	73	661 → 588	£500
Preliminary round	4 September 2004	182	588 → 406	£1,000
First qualifying round	18 September 2004	124	406 → 282	£2,250
Second qualifying round	2 October 2004	84	282 → 198	£3,750
Third qualifying round	16 October 2004	42	198 → 156	£5,000
Fourth qualifying round	30 October 2004	32	156 → 124	£10,000
First round proper	13 November 2004	40	124 → 84	£16,000
Second round proper	4 December 2004	20	84 → 64	£24,000
Third round proper	8 January 2005	32	64 → 32	£40,000
Fourth round proper	29 January 2005	16	32 → 16	£60,000
Fifth round proper	19 February 2005	8	16 → 8	£120,000
Sixth round proper	12 March 2005	4	8 → 4	£300,000
Semi-finals	16 April 2005	2	4 → 2	£900,000
Final	21 May 2005	1	2 → 1	£1,000,000

== Qualifying rounds ==
All participating clubs that were not members of the Premier League or Football League entered the competition in the qualifying rounds to secure one of 32 places available in the first round proper.

The winners from the fourth qualifying round were Southport, Vauxhall Motors, Hinckley United, Hereford United, Carlisle United, Halesowen Town, Tamworth, Halifax Town, Stafford Rangers, Morecambe, Alfreton Town, Leigh RMI, Coalville Town, Lancaster City, Billericay Town, Forest Green Rovers, Barnet, Canvey Island, Woking, Dagenham & Redbridge, Hornchurch, Exeter City, Slough Town, Bath City, Aldershot Town, Hayes, Thurrock, Yeading, Stevenage Borough, Tiverton Town, Histon and Cambridge City.

Coalville Town was appearing in the competition proper for the first time. Of the others, Alfreton Town had not featured in the main draw since 1973–74, Halesowen Town had not done so since 1991-92 and Yeading had not done so since 1994-95. Curiously, this would be the only season that both Yeading and Hayes qualified for the first round of the FA Cup prior to their 2007 merger.

== First round proper ==
This round was the first in which Football League teams from League One and League Two competed with non-league teams. Coalville Town, of the Midland Alliance, was the lowest-ranked team in the draw. Owing to the introduction of the Conference North and South competitions at Step 6 this season, the Midland Alliance was now at Step 9 of the English football pyramid.

- Ties were played over the weekend of 13 November and 14 November 2004.
- Cambridge City's victory over Leigh RMI made this the first season since 1966–67 in which City progressed further in the Cup than their crosstown rivals Cambridge United.

Tie no	Home team	Score	Away team	Attendance
1	Blackpool (3)	3 – 0	Tamworth (5)	4,796
2	Darlington (4)	3 – 3	Yeovil Town (4)	3,698
replay	Yeovil Town (4)	1 – 0	Darlington (4)	5,365
3	Barnet (5)	1 – 2	Bath City (7)	2,147
4	Bristol City (3)	1 – 1	Brentford (3)	10,000
replay	Brentford (3)	1 – 1	Bristol City (3)	3,706
Brentford won 4-3 on penalties
5	Bury (4)	5 – 2	Vauxhall Motors (6)	2,566
6	Histon (7)	2 – 0	Shrewsbury Town (4)	2,843
7	Rochdale (4)	2 – 1	Oxford United (4)	2,333
8	Notts County (4)	2 – 1	Woking (5)	4,562
9	Stafford Rangers (6)	0 – 2	Chester City (4)	2,492
10	Swindon Town (3)	4 – 1	Sheffield Wednesday (3)	6,160
11	Stockport County (3)	3 – 1	Huddersfield Town (3)	3,479
12	Wycombe Wanderers (4)	1 – 0	Coalville Town (9)	2,816
13	Bristol Rovers (4)	1 – 1	Carlisle United (5)	5,658
replay	Carlisle United (5)	1 – 0	Bristol Rovers (4)	4,813
14	Northampton Town (4)	1 – 0	Barnsley (3)	4,876
15	Bradford City (3)	0 – 1	Rushden & Diamonds (4)	4,171
16	Hull City (3)	3 – 2	Morecambe (5)	10,129
17	Southend United (4)	0 – 3	Luton Town (3)	6,683
18	Exeter City (5)	1 – 0	Grimsby Town (4)	3,378
19	Scunthorpe United (4)	2 – 0	Chesterfield (3)	4,869
20	Mansfield Town (4)	1 – 1	Colchester United (3)	3,202
replay	Colchester United (3)	4 – 1	Mansfield Town (4)	2,492
21	Alfreton Town (6)	1 – 1	Macclesfield Town (4)	2,251
replay	Macclesfield Town (4)	2 – 0	Alfreton Town (6)	1,783
22	Port Vale (3)	3 – 1	Kidderminster Harriers (4)	4,141
23	Halifax Town (5)	3 – 1	Cambridge United (4)	2,368
24	Cheltenham Town (4)	1 – 3	Swansea City (4)	4,551
25	Southport (6)	1 – 3	Hereford United (5)	2,045
26	Hayes (6)	0 – 4	Wrexham (3)	1,751
27	Tiverton Town (7)	1 – 3	Doncaster Rovers (3)	1,618
28	Boston United (4)	5 – 2	Hornchurch (6)	2,437
29	Peterborough United (3)	2 – 1	Tranmere Rovers (3)	2,940
30	Leyton Orient (4)	3 – 1	Dagenham & Redbridge (5)	4,155
31	Slough Town (7)	2 – 1	Walsall (3)	2,023
32	Cambridge City (6)	2 – 1	Leigh RMI (5)	930
33	Forest Green Rovers (5)	1 – 1	AFC Bournemouth (3)	1,837
replay	AFC Bournemouth (3)	3 – 1	Forest Green Rovers (5)	5,489
34	Hartlepool United (3)	3 – 0	Lincoln City (4)	4,533
35	Billericay Town (7)	0 – 1	Stevenage Borough (5)	1,804
36	Yeading (7)	2 – 1	Halesowen Town (7)	524
37	Aldershot Town (5)	4 – 0	Canvey Island (5)	2,600
38	Hinckley United (6)	2 – 0	Torquay United (3)	2,129
39	Thurrock (6)	0 – 1	Oldham Athletic (3)	1,156
40	Milton Keynes Dons (3)	1 – 0	Lancaster City (6)	2,065

== Second round proper ==
Ties were played over the weekend of 4 December 2004. The round featured four clubs from Step 7: Bath City and Histon from the Southern League Premier Division, and Slough Town and Yeading from the Isthmian League Premier Division.

Tie no	Home team	Score	Away team	Attendance
1	Blackpool (3)	1 – 0	Port Vale (3)	4,669
2	AFC Bournemouth (3)	2 – 1	Carlisle United (5)	5,815
3	Histon (7)	1 – 3	Yeovil Town (4)	2,564
4	Swindon Town (3)	1 – 1	Notts County (4)	5,768
replay	Notts County (4)	2 – 0	Swindon Town (3)	3,770
5	Stockport County (3)	0 – 0	Swansea City (4)	2,680
replay	Swansea City (4)	2 – 1	Stockport County (3)	5,572
6	Wycombe Wanderers (4)	0 – 3	Luton Town (3)	4,767
7	Northampton Town (4)	1 – 0	Bury (4)	4,415
8	Hull City (3)	4 – 0	Macclesfield Town (4)	9,831
9	Oldham Athletic (3)	4 – 0	Leyton Orient (4)	4,657
10	Exeter City (5)	2 – 1	Doncaster Rovers (3)	4,797
11	Scunthorpe United (4)	2 – 0	Wrexham (3)	5,698
12	Halifax Town (5)	1 – 3	Chester City (4)	4,497
13	Hereford United (5)	2 – 3	Boston United (4)	3,601
14	Peterborough United (3)	2 – 0	Bath City (7)	4,187
15	Slough Town (7)	1 – 3	Yeading (7)	2,418
16	Cambridge City (6)	0 – 1	Milton Keynes Dons (3)	2,000
17	Hartlepool United (3)	5 – 1	Aldershot Town (5)	4,556
18	Stevenage Borough (5)	0 – 2	Rochdale (4)	2,700
19	Rushden & Diamonds (4)	2 – 5	Colchester United (3)	3,077
20	Hinckley United (6)	0 – 0	Brentford (3)	2,661
replay	Brentford (3)	2 – 1	Hinckley United (6)	4,002

== Third round proper ==
This round marked the point at which Championship and Premier League (top-flight) teams entered the competition. Matches were played on the weekend of Saturday, 8 January 2005.

One of the surprise results of this round came at Old Trafford where holders Manchester United were held to a 0-0 home draw against Conference National side Exeter City, although United won the replay 2-0. Neighbours Manchester City suffered a humiliating defeat at the hands of League One strugglers Oldham Athletic, who beat them 1-0 at Boundary Park.

Yeading was again the lowest-ranked team in the draw, but their successful run was ended with a 2-0 loss at Loftus Road to Premier League side Newcastle United in front of more than 10,000 spectators.

Tie no	Home team	Score	Away team	Attendance
1	Arsenal (1)	2 – 1	Stoke City (2)	36,579
2	Notts County (4)	1 – 2	Middlesbrough (1)	13,671
3	Manchester United (1)	0 – 0	Exeter City (5)	67,551
replay	Exeter City (5)	0 – 2	Manchester United (1)	9,033
4	Plymouth Argyle (2)	1 – 3	Everton (1)	20,112
5	Leicester City (2)	2 – 2	Blackpool (3)	16,750
replay	Blackpool (3)	0 – 1	Leicester City (2)	6,938
6	Derby County (2)	2 – 1	Wigan Athletic (2)	14,457
7	Sunderland (2)	2 – 1	Crystal Palace (1)	17,536
8	Wolverhampton Wanderers (2)	2 – 0	Millwall (2)	12,566
9	Yeading (7)	0 – 2	Newcastle United (1)	10,824
10	Hull City (3)	0 – 2	Colchester United (3)	14,027
11	Tottenham Hotspur (1)	2 – 1	Brighton & Hove Albion (2)	36,094
12	Reading (2)	1 – 1	Swansea City (4)	13,642
replay	Swansea City (4)	0 – 1	Reading (2)	7,354
13	Birmingham City (1)	3 – 0	Leeds United (2)	25,159
14	Hartlepool United (3)	0 – 0	Boston United (4)	5,342
replay	Boston United (4)	0 – 1	Hartlepool United (3)	3,653
15	Milton Keynes Dons (3)	0 – 2	Peterborough United (3)	4,407
16	Oldham Athletic (3)	1 – 0	Manchester City (1)	13,171
17	Chelsea (1)	3 – 1	Scunthorpe United (4)	40,019
18	Cardiff City (2)	1 – 1	Blackburn Rovers (1)	14,145
replay	Blackburn Rovers (1)	3 – 2	Cardiff City (2)	9,140
19	Charlton Athletic (1)	4 – 1	Rochdale (4)	13,955
20	West Ham United (2)	1 – 0	Norwich City (1)	23,389
21	Sheffield United (2)	3 – 1	Aston Villa (1)	14,003
22	Preston North End (2)	0 – 2	West Bromwich Albion (1)	13,005
23	Rotherham United (2)	0 – 3	Yeovil Town (4)	5,397
24	Burnley (2)	1 – 0	Liverpool (1)	19,033
25	AFC Bournemouth (3)	2 – 1	Chester City (4)	7,653
26	Coventry City (2)	3 – 0	Crewe Alexandra (2)	7,629
27	Watford (2)	1 – 1	Fulham (1)	14,896
replay	Fulham (1)	2 – 0	Watford (2)	11,306
28	Ipswich Town (2)	1 – 3	Bolton Wanderers (1)	20,080
29	Portsmouth (1)	1 – 0	Gillingham (2)	14,252
30	Northampton Town (4)	1 – 3	Southampton (1)	7,183
31	Queens Park Rangers (2)	0 – 3	Nottingham Forest (2)	11,140
32	Luton Town (3)	0 – 2	Brentford (3)	6,681

== Fourth round proper ==
Ties played during the weekend of 29 January 2005. Yeovil Town, in only their second season in League Two, was the lowest-ranked team in the draw.

Tie no	Home team	Score	Away team	Attendance
1	Derby County (2)	1 – 1	Fulham (1)	22,040
replay	Fulham (1)	4 – 2	Derby County (2)	15,528
2	Manchester United (1)	3 – 0	Middlesbrough (1)	67,251
3	Blackburn Rovers (1)	3 – 0	Colchester United (3)	10,634
4	Chelsea (1)	2 – 0	Birmingham City (1)	40,379
5	West Ham United (2)	1 – 1	Sheffield United (2)	25,449
replay	Sheffield United (2)	1 – 1	West Ham United (2)	15,067
Sheffield United won 3-1 on penalties
6	Oldham Athletic (3)	0 – 1	Bolton Wanderers (1)	12,029
7	Arsenal (1)	2 – 0	Wolverhampton Wanderers (2)	37,135
8	Everton (1)	3 – 0	Sunderland (2)	33,186
9	Nottingham Forest (2)	1 – 0	Peterborough United (3)	16,774
10	Brentford (3)	0 – 0	Hartlepool United (3)	8,967
replay	Hartlepool United (3)	0 – 1	Brentford (3)	7,580
11	Reading (2)	1 – 2	Leicester City (2)	14,825
12	Burnley (2)	2 – 0	AFC Bournemouth (3)	9,944
13	Southampton (1)	2 – 1	Portsmouth (1)	29,453
14	West Bromwich Albion (1)	1 – 1	Tottenham Hotspur (1)	22,441
replay	Tottenham Hotspur (1)	3 – 1	West Bromwich Albion (1)	27,860
15	Newcastle United (1)	3 – 1	Coventry City (2)	44,044
16	Charlton Athletic (1)	3 – 2	Yeovil Town (4)	22,873

== Fifth round proper ==
Matches played weekend of 19 February 2005 - replays were played during the week commencing 28 February 2005.

The only non-Premiership side to win in this round was Leicester City, who triumphed 2-1 at The Valley against Premier League side Charlton Athletic, while Brentford was the last team from League One left in the competition.

Tie no	Home team	Score	Away team	Attendance
1	Bolton Wanderers (1)	1 – 0	Fulham (1)	16,151
2	Tottenham Hotspur (1)	1 – 1	Nottingham Forest (2)	35,640
replay	Nottingham Forest (2)	0 – 3	Tottenham Hotspur (1)	28,062
3	Everton (1)	0 – 2	Manchester United (1)	38,664
4	Charlton Athletic (1)	1 – 2	Leicester City (2)	23,719
5	Burnley (2)	0 – 0	Blackburn Rovers (1)	21,468
replay	Blackburn Rovers (1)	2 – 1	Burnley (2)	28,691
6	Southampton (1)	2 – 2	Brentford (3)	24,741
replay	Brentford (3)	1 – 3	Southampton (1)	11,720
7	Newcastle United (1)	1 – 0	Chelsea (1)	45,740
8	Arsenal (1)	1 – 1	Sheffield United (2)	36,891
replay	Sheffield United (2)	0 – 0	Arsenal (1)	27,595
Arsenal win 4-2 on penalties

== Sixth round proper ==
Matches played on the weekend of Saturday, 12 March 2005.

Leicester City, the only remaining non-Premiership side in the competition, lost 1–0 to Blackburn Rovers.

13 March 2005
16:00

Newcastle United (1)	1–0	Tottenham Hotspur (1)
Kluivert 5'	Report

St James' Park, Newcastle
Attendance: 51,307
Referee: Rob Styles, Hampshire

12 March 2005
17:15

Southampton (1)	0–4	Manchester United (1)
	Report	Keane 2'; Ronaldo 45'; Scholes 48', 87'

St Mary's Stadium, Southampton
Attendance: 30,971
Referee: Howard Webb, Yorkshire

12 March 2005
12:15

Bolton Wanderers (1)	0–1	Arsenal (1)
	Report	Ljungberg 3'

Reebok Stadium, Bolton
Attendance: 23,523
Referee: Steve Bennett, Kent

13 March 2005
13:05

Blackburn Rovers (1)	1–0	Leicester City (2)
Dickov 83'	Report

Ewood Park, Blackburn
Attendance: 22,113
Referee: Neale Barry, Lincolnshire

== Semi-finals ==
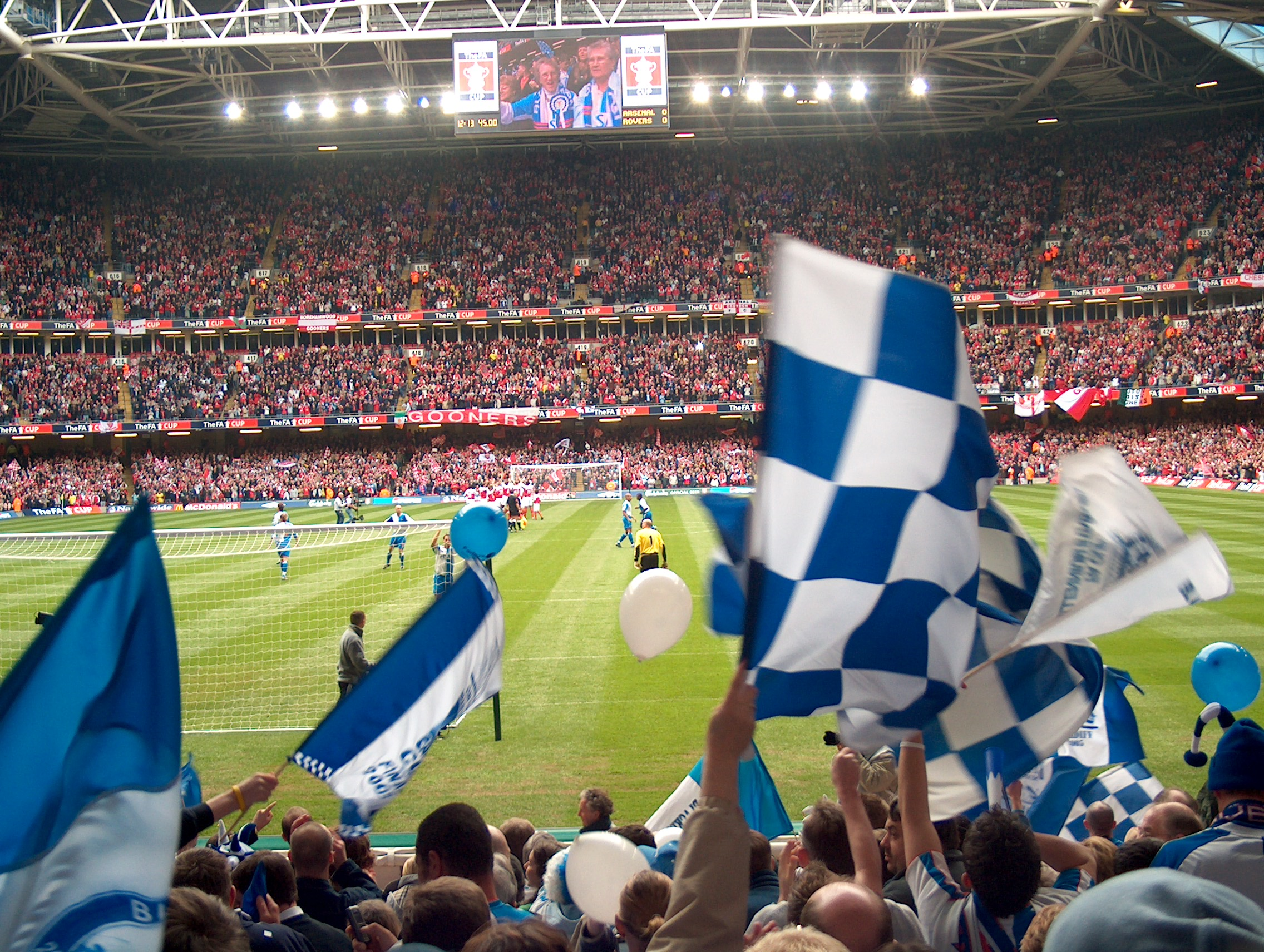
The Millennium Stadium during the Arsenal v Blackburn semi-final, 16 April 2005

- Matches played on the weekend of Saturday, 16 April 2005.
- Both ties were played at neutral venues
16 April 2005
12:15

Arsenal (1)	3–0	Blackburn Rovers (1)
Pires 42'; Van Persie 86', 90'	Report

Millennium Stadium, Cardiff, Wales
Attendance: 52,077
Referee: Steve Dunn

17 April 2005
14:00

Newcastle United (1)	1–4	Manchester United (1)
Ameobi 59'	Report	Van Nistelrooy 19', 58'; Scholes 45'; Ronaldo 76'

Millennium Stadium, Cardiff, Wales
Attendance: 69,280
Referee: Mike Riley

== Final ==
The 2005 FA Cup final was contested between Manchester United and Arsenal at the Millennium Stadium in Cardiff. Manchester United dominated the game but failed to take any of their opportunities and ultimately they went on to lose in the first FA Cup Final penalty shoot-out. Paul Scholes had his kick saved by Jens Lehmann, leaving Patrick Vieira with the opportunity to win the Cup for the Gunners.

21 May 2005
15:00 BST

Arsenal	0–0 (a.e.t.)	Manchester United
Penalties
Lauren (penalty scored); Ljungberg (penalty scored); Van Persie (penalty scored); Cole (penalty scored); Vieira (penalty scored)	5–4	(penalty scored) Van Nistelrooy; (penalty missed) Scholes; (penalty scored) Ronaldo; (penalty scored) Rooney; (penalty scored) Keane

Millennium Stadium, Cardiff
Attendance: 71,876
Referee: Rob Styles (Hampshire)

== Top scorers ==
Rank	Player	Club	Goals
1	(Portugal) Cristiano Ronaldo	Manchester United	4
1	(England) Peter Crouch	Southampton	4
1	(England) Jermain Defoe	Tottenham Hotspur	4
4	(Nigeria) Shola Ameobi	Newcastle United	3
4	(Wales) Robert Earnshaw	West Bromwich Albion	3
4	(England) Bryan Hughes	Charlton Athletic	3
4	(Republic of Ireland) Robbie Keane	Tottenham Hotspur	3
4	(Scotland) Andy Liddell	Sheffield United	3
4	(Norway) Morten Gamst Pedersen	Blackburn Rovers	3
4	(England) Wayne Rooney	Manchester United	3
4	(England) Paul Scholes	Manchester United	3
4	(Netherlands) Robin van Persie	Arsenal	3

== Media coverage ==
In the United Kingdom, the BBC were the free to air broadcasters for the fourth consecutive season while Sky Sports were the subscription broadcasters for the seventeenth consecutive season.. In this new contract period of television rights, the BBC's coverage increased further to three live matches from rounds 3 to 6, plus one live replay in the same rounds where applicable.

The matches shown live on the BBC were:

- Thurrock 0-1 Oldham Athletic (R1)
- Hinckley United 0-0 Brentford (R2)
- Sheffield United 3-1 Aston Villa (R3)
- Plymouth Argyle 1-3 Everton (R3)
- Yeading 0-2 Newcastle United (R3)
- Exeter City 0-2 Manchester United (R3 Replay)
- Southampton 2-1 Portsmouth (R4)
- Manchester United 3-0 Middlesbrough (R4)
- Oldham Athletic 0-1 Bolton Wanderers (R4)
- Tottenham Hotspur 3-1 West Bromwich Albion (R4 Replay)
- Arsenal 1-1 Sheffield United (R5)
- Everton 0-2 Manchester United (R5)
- Burnley 0-0 Blackburn Rovers (R5)
- Sheffield United 0-0 Arsenal (R5 Replay)
- Bolton Wanderers 0-1 Arsenal (QF)
- Southampton 0-4 Manchester United (QF)
- Blackburn Rovers 1-0 Leicester City (QF)
- Newcastle United 1-4 Manchester United (SF)
- Arsenal 0-0 Manchester United (Final)

The matches shown live on Sky Sports were:

- Southend United 0-3 Luton Town (R1)
- Brentford 1-1 Bristol City (R1 Replay)
- Scunthorpe United 2-0 Wrexham (R2)
- Notts County 2-0 Swindon Town (R2 Replay)
- Burnley 1-0 Liverpool (R3)
- Swansea City 0-1 Reading (R3 Replay)
- Chelsea 2-0 Birmingham City (R4)
- Sheffield United 1-1 West Ham United (R4 Replay)
- Newcastle United 1-0 Chelsea (R5)
- Nottingham Forest 0-3 Tottenham Hotspur (R5 Replay)
- Newcastle United 1-0 Tottenham Hotspur (QF)
- Arsenal 3-0 Blackburn Rovers (SF)
- Arsenal 0-0 Manchester United (Final)
