= Matt Dickinson (journalist) =

English sports journalist (born 1968)

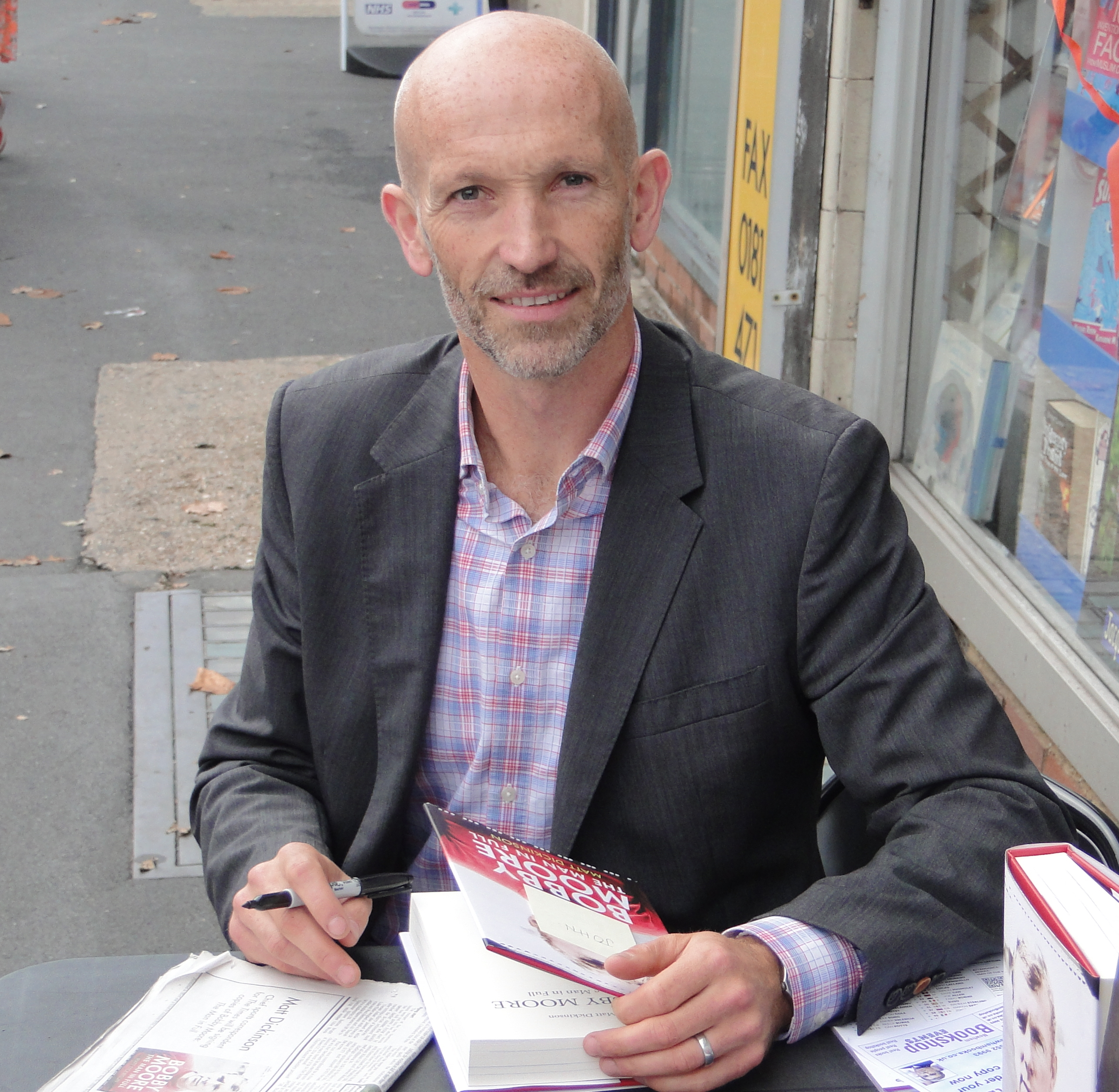
- Dickinson signing his book on Bobby Moore, September 2014
- Born: Matthew John Dickinson; 16 November 1968 (age 57)
- Education: Cambridge University
- Occupation: Sports Journalist
- Years active: 1991-present
- Employer: The Times

Matt Dickinson (born 16 November 1968) is an English sports journalist, who is currently chief football correspondent of The Times.

== Education ==
Dickinson was educated at The Perse School and received a B.A. in law from Robinson College, Cambridge. Dickinson has also completed a post graduate degree at Cardiff University.

== Career ==
Dickinson worked for the Cambridge Evening News until he joined the Daily Express in 1991. He joined The Times in 1997. He was appointed football correspondent and, in 1999, conducted an interview with England manager, Glenn Hoddle, which led to his resignation. Hoddle had expressed controversial views on reincarnation and the disabled. Dickinson was made chief football correspondent in 2002. In 2014 his book, "Bobby Moore, The Man in Full", was published.

=== Awards ===
Dickinson was named Young Sports Writer of the Year at the British Sports Journalism Awards in 1993. At the awards in 2000, he was named the Sports Writer of the Year.
