= British Sports Journalism Awards winners for Sports Newspaper of the Year =

The British Sports Journalism Awards are given annually in a number of categories. The category "Sports Newspaper of the Year" has been awarded since 2010.

== Sports Newspaper of the Year winners ==
- 2018: tbc
- 2017: The Guardian
- 2016: The Daily Mail
- 2015: The Daily Mail
- 2014: The Daily Mail
- 2013: The Daily Mail
- 2012: The Times
- 2011: The Times
- 2010: The Times
