= Martha Kelner =

British journalist

Martha Kelner (born c. 1990) is a British journalist who is an American correspondent for Sky News.

She had been a sports reporter, and is the daughter of Martin Kelner, also a sports reporter. Kelner has reported a number of high-profile stories, including doping in Russia, allegations of a culture of bullying in British Cycling and Chris Froome's failed doping test.

== Journalism career ==
After graduating from the University of Sheffield, she joined her father's newspaper the Daily Mail in 2011. In March 2017, Kelner was appointed Chief Sports Reporter at The Guardian.

In late 2018, Kelner left The Guardian to join Sky News as one of the channel's sports correspondents. In mid-2021, she became Sky News American correspondent covering North America. One of the first stories she covered in the United States was the 2021 Miami building collapse.

In March 2025, she was involved in a viral altercation with Marjorie Taylor Greene. She attempted to question the congresswoman on the United States government group chat leak.

== Awards ==
Kelner won the 2012 Young Sportswriter Award at the SJA Sports Journalism Awards. She was "highly commended" at the 2017 SJA's in the sports reporting category.

During her time at The Guardian, Kelner was shortlisted for the 2017 British Journalism Awards alongside Sean Ingle in the Sports Reporting category for their scoop on the Chris Froome failed drug test.

At the 2020 RTS Television Journalism Awards Kelner won the ‘Young Talent of The Year’ award.
