= Sean Ingle =

British journalist

- Born: Luton, UK
- Education: University of Sheffield
- Occupation: Sports Journalist
- Employer: The Guardian
- Awards: British Sports Journalism Awards

Sean Ingle is a British sports journalist. He is currently the chief sports reporter and columnist for The Guardian and The Observer. He was previously the newspaper's athletics correspondent and online sports editor.

== Early life and education ==
Ingle was born in Luton, UK. He is the great-nephew of boxing trainer Brendan Ingle, who trained world champions Naseem Hamed, Johnny Nelson, Junior Witter, Kell Brook and Kid Galahad. He was educated at Luton Sixth Form College before graduating from the University of Sheffield with a first-class degree in Political Science and Government in 1997.

== Career ==
Ingle began his career in journalism as a sports writer for EMAP in 1998. He joined The Guardian a year and a half later in the same capacity until he was promoted to deputy sports editor and then sports editor of the website in 2004. He also launched the popular podcast Football Weekly, which was nominated for a Sony award.

Ingle was posted to Germany to cover the 2006 World Cup for The Guardian. In Baden-Baden, while at a restaurant with colleague Jonathan Wilson, he was bitten on the buttocks by a German Shepherd; the dog bit him so hard that he bled.

He remained as the sports editor of the website until after the 2012 Olympics in London, when he was named a senior sports writer and Athletics Correspondent, as he returned to full-time reporting duties for The Guardian, Observer and the website. He also began writing a weekly column on issues in sport. In 2016 he co-authored Greg Rutherford's autobiography "Unexpected"

Ingle has broken several high-profile stories, including the revelation that four-time Tour de France winner Chris Froome failed a doping test during the Vuelta a España road race in September 2017. His report, co-authored with Martha Kelner, won Scoop of the Year at the 2017 British Sports Journalism Awards.

He was named Specialist Correspondent of the Year at the 2016 and 2017 British Sports Journalism Awards.
