= Martin Samuel =

English sports columnist

- Born: 25 July 1964; London, England
- Occupation: Sports columnist
- Employer(s): Hayters; News UK; Daily Mail; The Times; News of the World; GQ; The Tortoise; Jewish Chronicle; Daily Express; The Sun and Sunday People
- Awards: British Press Awards - Sports Writer of the Year (2007, 2013); British Sports Journalism Awards - Sports Journalist of the Year (2005, 2006, 2007, 2010, 2013, 2014); What The Papers Say Awards - Sports Journalist of the Year (2002, 2005, 2006); Editorial Intelligence Comment Awards - Sports Commentator of the Year (2014)

Martin Samuel (born 25 July 1964) is Chief Correspondent of The Times News UK and has previously worked for the Daily Mail, The Times, News of the World, GQ, The Tortoise, Jewish Chronicle, Daily Express, The Sun and Sunday People. Samuel was an occasional guest on the Sunday Supplement television show.

== Career ==
Samuel began his career at Hayters news agency in London and has written for several national newspapers in the UK before he settled initially at The Times, where he was named Sports Writer of the Year at the British Press Awards in 2007, and Sports Journalist of the Year at the British Sports Journalism Awards in 2005, 2006 and 2007. Samuel was also Sports Journalist of the Year at the 'What The Papers Say' awards in 2002, 2005 and 2006. He moved to the Daily Mail in 2008, replacing the paper's sports columnist, Paul Hayward, who was returning to The Guardian.

During his time at the Daily Mail, Samuel was again named Sports Journalist of the Year at the British Sports Journalism Awards in 2010 and 2013, Sports Writer of the Year at the British Press Awards in 2013, and Sports Commentator of the Year at the Editorial Intelligence Comment Awards in 2014. In 2012, Samuel was named top in a UK Press Gazette poll of Britain's best sports journalists. In January 2015, he was named in Debrett's List of the 500 Most Influential People in Britain. In January 2023, Samuel joined News UK writing for The Times and Sunday Times.

Samuel ghostwrote Harry Redknapp's autobiography, Always Managing, published in 2013 and its follow-up, 'A Man Walks On To A Pitch', published a year later. He also wrote a book with Malcolm Macdonald, "How To Score Goals", published in 1985.

== Awards ==
- Sports Writer of the Year, What the Papers Say awards (2002)
- Sports Writer of the Year, Football Supporters' Federation, 2003
- Sports Writer of the Year, What the Papers Say awards (2005)
- Sports Writer of the Year, What the Papers Say awards (2006)
- Sports Writer of the Year, Sports Journalists' Association of Great Britain (2005)
- Sports Writer of the Year, Sports Journalists' Association of Great Britain (2006)
- Sports Writer of the Year, Sports Journalists' Association of Great Britain (2007)
- Sports Journalist of the Year, Sports Journalists' Association of Great Britain, 2010
- Sports Journalist of the Year, Sports Journalists' Association of Great Britain, 2013
- Sports Journalist of the Year, British Press Awards (2008)
- Sports Journalist of the Year, British Press Awards (2013)
- Sports Commentator of the Year at the Editorial Intelligence Comment Awards in 2014
- Sports Writer of the Year, Sports Journalists' Association of Great Britain, 2014
- Sports Columnist of the Year, Sports Journalists' Association of Great Britain, 2014
- Live Reporter of the Year, Sports Journalists' Association of Great Britain, 2021
