= Sports Journalists' Association =

- British Equestrian Media Association
- Website: sportsjournalists.co.uk

The Sports Journalists' Association (SJA) is an association for British sports journalists. It represents the British sports media on the British Olympic Association's press advisory committee and acts as a consultant to organizers of major events who need guidance on media requirements as well as seeking to represent its members' interests in a range of activities. Its president is Darren Lewis who succeeded the distinguished sports columnist Patrick Collins The Mail on Sunday, in 2023. Previously the position had been held by veteran broadcaster and columnist Sir Michael Parkinson and broadcasting executive John Bromley. SJA Membership is open to journalists, photographers, broadcasters, reporters, editors, and cartoonists. However, in order to obtain a full membership you have to be a sports journalist based in the United Kingdom.

== History ==
The association was founded in 1948, as the Sports Writers' Association. Following a merger with the Professional Sports Photographers' Association in 2002, the organisation subsequently changed its title to the more inclusive Sports Journalists' Association. Furthermore, the SJA worked alongside the Glasgow Commonwealth Games. Being the driving force behind its development, the recognition that the Commonwealth Games brought to the Sports Journalists Association helped SJA to become known in the sport of rugby. Since then, the SJA has been very successful. In 2012, the Sports Journalists' Association was fortunate to be included within the 10,000 other colleagues involved at the Olympics in London.

== Awards ==
The SJA stages two annual award events.

British Sports Awards

The British Sports Awards is the oldest ceremony of its kind. It was in 1949 that it first recognised the outstanding sporting performances of the year. James Dear (rackets), Reg Harris (cycling), Johnny Leach (table tennis), Freddie Mills (boxing), Tommy Price (speedway) were all honoured in the first year.

In 1959 the first award for sportswoman of the year was presented to Mary Rand (athletics) and in 1963 the Bill McGowran award was inaugurated to recognise athletes with a disability.

In subsequent years, the awards were expanded.

- SJA Sportswoman of the Year
- SJA Sportsman of the Year
- SJA Team of the Year
- The National Lottery Spirit of Sport Award
- SJA President's Award
- BT Sport JL Manning Award for services off the field of play
- SJA Committee Award
- SJA Bill McGowran Trophy for achievement in Paralympic sport
- SJA Peter Wilson Trophy for international newcomer
- SJA Chairman's Award
- SJA Pat Besford Award for outstanding performance of the year

=== British Sports Journalism Awards ===
These are considered to be the industry's "Oscars" and typically take place each March.

In March 2008, Martin Samuel, then chief football correspondent of The Times, was named British Sportswriter of the Year, the first time any journalist had managed to win the award three years in succession. At the same awards, Jeff Stelling, of Sky Sports, was named Sports Broadcaster of the Year for the third time, a prize determined by a ballot of SJA members. Stelling won the vote again the following year, when the Sunday Times's Paul Kimmage won the interviewer of the year prize for a fifth time. The awards for broadcasters have subsequently widened in scope and are now chosen by a panel of judges. They are regarded as highly prestigious within the industry.

The awards have included

- The John Bromley Sportswriter of the Year award
- The Ed Lacey Trophy for the Sports Photographer of the Year
- The Sports Newspaper of the Year
- The Doug Gardner Award
- Sports Newspaper of the Year
- Broadcast Sports Presenter
- Broadcast Journalist
- Television Sport Live Broadcast
- Radios Sport Live Broadcast
- Television Sport Documentary
- Radio Sport Documentary
- Best Special Package
- Laureus Sports Website
- Specialist Sports Website
- Sports Scoop
- Ladbrokes Specialist Correspondent
- Investigative Sports Reporter
- Sports Columnist
- Sports Feature Writer
- Sports News Reporter
- Cricket Writer
- Football Writer
- Rugby Writer
- Regional Writer
- Young Sports Writer
- David Welch Student Sports Writer
- Sports Picture
- Sports Portfolio
- Specialist Sports Portfolio
- Sports News Picture

== Events ==
The Sports Journalists' Association holds events that cover various causes. Whether they are social or informative events, the SJA plays an important role in sports media. Members are welcomed to participate and enjoy activities involving horse racing, golf, and cricket. For those not interested in social events like so, they're open to join in on a masterclass. By attending one of these masterclasses, information will be shared by leading sports journalists that may possibly enhance the skills of a sports journalist.

== Sports Media LGBT+ ==
The SJA is connected to the Sports Media LGBT+ network, which aims to provide a space for LGBT+ people and allies working in sports journalism, TV production, public relations and all other sports media related roles, to connect in person and online, in order to share experiences, advice, content ideas, and other professional support and assistance.
