= British Sports Journalism Awards =

British journalism award

- Awarded for: Excellence in sports journalism
- Country: Great Britain
- Presented by: Sports Journalists' Association
- First award: 1976
- Website: www.sportsjournalists.co.uk/sja-journalism-awards//

The British Sports Journalism Awards is an annual ceremony organised by the Sports Journalists' Association that recognise the best of sports journalism in Britain in the previous calendar year. The awards are widely considered the BAFTAs of the industry, and attract entries from all major domestic and international media outlets.

== History ==
The first edition of the awards was held in 1976 with the Sports Writer of the Year given to celebrated journalists Ian Wooldridge and Hugh McIlvanney. More categories across broadcast and print have been added over the years. The ceremony is held at a gala dinner in London every February.

Principal categories that have held constant since the awards' inception include the John Bromley Sportswriter of the Year, Sports Photographer of the Year, Sports Newspaper of the Year, and the Doug Gardner Award for outstanding contributions to the SJA.

== Categories ==
- John Bromley Sportswriter of the Year
- Ed Lacey Trophy for the Sports Photographer of the Year
- Sports Newspaper of the Year
- Doug Gardner Award
- Sports Newspaper of the Year
- Broadcast Sports Presenter
- Broadcast Journalist
- Television Sport Live Broadcast
- Radios Sport Live Broadcast
- Television Sport Documentary
- Radio Sport Documentary
- Best Special Package
- Laureus Sports Website
- Specialist Sports Website
- Sports Scoop
- Specialist Correspondent
- Investigative Sports Reporter
- Sports Columnist
- Sports Feature Writer
- Sports News Reporter
- Cricket Writer
- Football Writer
- Rugby Writer
- Regional Writer
- Young Sports Writer
- David Welch Student Sports Writer (discontinued from 2018)
- Sports Picture
- Sports Portfolio
- Specialist Sports Portfolio
- Sports News Picture

== Repeat Recipients ==
Notable repeat recipients of the British Sports Journalism Awards include Hugh McIlvanney of The Sunday Times and Martin Samuel of The Daily Mail who have both won Sports Writer of the Year six times. Eamonn McCabe was Sports Photographer four times, while Matt Lawton was Sports News Reporter of the Year four times. Paul Hayward has been named Sports Writer of the Year three times in four years.

Michael Atherton of The Times has won all four editions of Cricket Journalist, while Daniel Taylor of The Guardian has won three editions of Football Journalist of the Year. Sean Ingle, also of The Guardian, has won Specialist Correspondent on two occasions.
