= Glasgow Commonwealth Games =

The Glasgow Commonwealth Games may refer to:

- 2014 Commonwealth Games
- 2026 Commonwealth Games
