= Daniel Taylor (journalist) =

British football journalist and author

Daniel Taylor is a British journalist and author. He was the chief football writer for The Guardian and The Observer from 2012 to 2019, having joined the newspaper in 2000; in October 2019, he joined The Athletic. In March 2017 he won news reporter of the year and sports journalist of the year at The Press Awards for his series of stories about the United Kingdom football sexual abuse scandal. In 2025, Taylor was named by the British Press Awards as its winner of the Hugh McIlvanney sports-journalist-of-the-year award for the third time.

== Career ==
Taylor began his career at the Newark Advertiser and was a freelance journalist in Leicester and Manchester before joining The Guardian. Originally from Nottinghamshire, he is based in Manchester and London.

He also won the Sports Journalists' Association football writer of the year in 2015, 2016, 2017 and 2018, as well as the 2016 scoop of the year prize for his investigation into the abuse scandal and the 2017 sports writer of the year award. The London Press Club also honoured him in 2017 with its scoop of the year award and there have been further honours from the British Journalism Awards and the Foreign Press Association, which named him both sports journalist and news journalist of the year. In 2019 he won The Press Awards sports journalist of the year for a second time.

Taylor has also been commended for his exposure of a cover-up within the Football Association (FA) after the England women's footballer Eniola Aluko made complaints about alleged racial discrimination from the manager Mark Sampson. The FA subsequently apologised to Aluko after the investigation led to a parliamentary hearing. A new FA-commissioned inquiry upheld Aluko's allegations.

In October 2019, Taylor joined The Athletic. He was named feature writer of the year at the Sports Journalists' Association awards in 2022 and also become the first two-time winner of the North West Football Awards journalist of the year.

In 2025, the British Press Awards named Taylor as its winner of the Hugh McIlvanney sports-journalist-of-the-year award for the third time.

=== Books ===
He is a lifelong Nottingham Forest fan and wrote a book about the club, Deep into the Forest, published in 2011. In November 2015 he published I Believe in Miracles, a book on the rise of Nottingham Forest under Brian Clough, to accompany the film of the same name. His other publications include This Is the One, a two-year diary of covering Alex Ferguson's time at Manchester United.

The book publishers Pan MacMillan hired Taylor as the ghost-writer for Kevin Keegan's autobiography, which was published in 2018.
