= Paul Hayward (journalist) =

British sports journalist

- Born: 6 January 1965 (age 61); Cuckfield, Sussex
- Occupation: Journalist
- Years active: 1995–present
- Awards: British Sports Writer of the Year 1996, 2012, 2015, 2016, 2018

Paul Hayward (born 6 January 1965) is a British sports journalist and author of 'England Football - The Biography (1872-2022)' - a 150-year history of the England men's team. He was until recently Chief Sports Writer at The Daily Telegraph. He has previously written for The Guardian, The Independent, The Observer and the Daily Mail, and regularly appeared as an analyst on Sky Sports' television programme Sunday Supplement.

== Career ==
Hayward began his career as a sports journalist at the Racing Post before moving to The Independent to become racing correspondent. He then branched into general sport and became Chief Sports Writer at The Telegraph before occupying the same position at The Guardian, Mail and The Observer. During that time, he was named Sports Writer of the Year in 2002 and 2003 at the British Press Awards, and Best Football Writer at the Sky Sports Awards in 1997, 1999 and 2001.

He returned to The Guardian and its sister paper The Observer in 2009 as a senior sports writer, predominantly covering football, until he re-joined The Telegraph in 2011, again as its chief sports writer. He took time off from writing in 2015 to undergo cancer treatment but recovered in time to cover the 2015 Rugby World Cup.

He has also been named Sports writer of the Year at the SJA British Sports Journalism awards in 1996, 2012, 2015, 2016 and 2018. He co-wrote autobiographies with Sir Alex Ferguson, Sir Bobby Robson, Michael Owen and Kevin Sinfield (May 2023).
