= Manchester United–Arsenal brawl =

Manchester United–Arsenal brawl may refer to:

- Manchester United–Arsenal brawl (1990)
- Battle of Old Trafford, 2003
- Battle of the Buffet, 2004
