= 2004–05 Manchester United F.C. season =

English football club season

Manchester United
2004–05 season
- Chairman: Sir Roy Gardner
- Manager: Sir Alex Ferguson
- Stadium: Old Trafford
- Premier League: 3rd
- FA Cup: Runners-up
- League Cup: Semi-finals
- UEFA Champions League: Round of 16
- FA Community Shield: Runners-up
- Top goalscorer: League: Wayne Rooney (11); All: Wayne Rooney (17)
- Highest home attendance: 67,989 vs Portsmouth (26 February 2005)
- Lowest home attendance: 48,891 vs Crystal Palace (10 November 2004)
- Average home league attendance: 67,856
Home colours	Away colours	Third colours

The 2004–05 season was Manchester United's 13th season in the Premier League, and their 30th consecutive season in the top division of English football.

The season finished trophyless (only their fourth trophyless season in 17 seasons) for United, who finished third in the Premier League with 77 points. The title went to Chelsea, who finished the season with a record 95 points and lost just one game all season, with the previous season's champions Arsenal finishing runners-up.

Their Champions League campaign ended in the first knockout round at Milan, while they were eliminated from the League Cup by Chelsea in the semi-finals. The last chance of silverware was blown by a Paul Scholes penalty miss against Arsenal in a shoot-out after a goalless draw in the 2005 FA Cup Final.

On a more positive note for the club, newly signed 19-year-old striker and leading club goalscorer Wayne Rooney was voted PFA Young Player of the Year.

United also ended Arsenal's record-breaking 49-game unbeaten league run with a 2–0 home win in late October.

== Pre-season and friendlies ==
Manchester United played their first pre-season fixture of the 2004–05 season away to Cobh Ramblers. United won 2–1, through goals from Mads Timm and Kenny Cooper.

The Reds then set off to North America for their pre-season tour, taking part in the ChampionsWorld Series. Their first match, played at the Soldier Field in Chicago, United States against Bayern Munich. After a 0–0 draw, the match went to penalties, with Bayern prevailing 4–2 in the shoot-out. United's next game of their pre-season tour was against Celtic at the Lincoln Financial Field. Chris Sutton gave Celtic an early lead with a penalty after Jonathan Spector fouled Stiliyan Petrov. Alan Smith equalised for United with a header from a corner kick, but Craig Beattie scored the winner for Celtic after Roy Keane lost possession.

After the 2–1 loss against Celtic, United played their final game of the tour against Milan in New York City. Like the Bayern game, the game against Milan ended in a draw, after Andriy Shevchenko cancelled out Paul Scholes' early goal. Penalties were required, with United losing again, this time 9–8. The result meant that Manchester United ended their pre-season tour of the United States without a win.

After returning to England, United played in the Vodafone Cup at Old Trafford, a four-team tournament featuring PSV, Boca Juniors and Urawa Red Diamonds. United played against PSV on 3 August 2004, a Mikaël Silvestre goal giving them a 1–0 win. Two days later, United were scheduled to play their final game, against Urawa Red Diamonds, but it was indefinitely postponed due to an electrical storm. Boca Juniors – who were beating PSV 1–0 on the day, before the abandonment of their match – won the tournament on a points system that awarded an extra point for each goal scored, bolstered by their 5–2 win against Urawa Red Diamonds a few days prior.

Two days after the league campaign started, United played their final friendly, a trip to Lancashire rivals Burnley for Stan Ternent's testimonial. Goals from Scholes, Phil Neville and Chris Eagles secured a 3–1 win.

Date	Opponents	H / A	Result F–A	Scorers	Attendance
18 July 2004	Cobh Ramblers	A	2–1	Timm 18', Cooper 84'	7,000
25 July 2004	Bayern Munich	N	0–0 (2–4p)		58,121
28 July 2004	Celtic	N	1–2	Smith 35'	55,421
31 July 2004	Milan	N	1–1 (8–9p)	Scholes 33'	74,511
3 August 2004	PSV Eindhoven	H	1–0	Silvestre 26'	29,479
5 August 2004	Urawa Red Diamonds	H	—	Match cancelled due to bad weather	
17 August 2004	Burnley	A	3–1	Scholes 30', P. Neville 38', Eagles 47'	8,814

== FA Community Shield ==
As winners of the 2003–04 FA Cup, Manchester United played in the 2004 FA Community Shield against Arsenal. United lost 3–1. José Antonio Reyes set up Gilberto Silva to tap home the opening goal for the Gunners. Alan Smith lashed in United's equaliser, but within three minutes Reyes drove home a fierce left-foot shot to restore Arsenal's lead. Ashley Cole's cross deflected in off Mikaël Silvestre for Arsenal's winning third goal.

Date	Opponents	H / A	Result F–A	Scorers	Attendance
8 August 2004	Arsenal	N	1–3	Smith 55'	63,317

== FA Premier League ==
Manchester United opened their Premier League campaign with an away game against Chelsea on 15 August 2004. United lost 1–0 through an Eiður Guðjohnsen goal in the 14th minute. The Icelandic striker took advantage of a weak challenge by United goalkeeper Tim Howard to scramble home the winner after 14 minutes. It was harsh on Alex Ferguson's depleted side, who enjoyed the majority of possession but could not cash in. Summer signing Alan Smith headed wide from a good chance and Ryan Giggs missed a similar opportunity with 10 minutes left as Chelsea hung on. This result left United hanging just above the relegation zone in 17th place.

United got their first win of the season with a 2–1 win against Norwich City at Old Trafford. Alan Smith scored the winner in the 49th minute on his home debut for the Red Devils with a volley that added to David Bellion's close-range finish in the 32nd minute that was set up by Smith. Norwich substitute Paul McVeigh pulled a goal back late on when he shot home from 18 yards out but United held on.

After a 1–1 draw against Blackburn Rovers, which saw Smith score a last-minute equaliser, United's next game was a home game against Everton. United hit the post three times in the match. Cristiano Ronaldo hit the upright with a fizzing drive, as did Smith with a similar effort, and Paul Scholes also saw a shot come back off the post. But United were lucky not to concede a penalty when Mikaël Silvestre blatantly used his arm to clear the ball from a lurking Duncan Ferguson. In the first half, Louis Saha missed a great chance when he headed wide. It was the only clear-cut opportunity of the opening 45 minutes, with United lacking the cohesion to break down an Everton side content to sit deep and defend.

A third successive draw occurred for United, as they drew 2–2 with Bolton Wanderers at the Reebok Stadium. United got an equaliser in injury time through David Bellion, with the ball appearing to come off his arm. Before Bellion's dramatic equaliser, United seemed set to lose after a mix-up between Tim Howard and Mikaël Silvestre allowed Les Ferdinand to net. Ferdinand's goal came after Kevin Nolan had equalised for Bolton, heading home after his initial shot was blocked. Gabriel Heinze gave United a first-half lead on his debut, but it was not the perfect start he may have expected. This result left United in 11th place.

On 20 September, United moved up three places in the FA Premier League table to 8th after a 2–1 home win against their rivals, Liverpool. After Cristiano Ronaldo hit the post early on, Mikaël Silvestre gave United the lead, ghosting in at the far post to head home Ryan Giggs' free kick. Liverpool drew level soon after the break when Steve Finnan's header was inadvertently turned in by fellow Irishman John O'Shea. But another header from Silvestre secured three points for United, as the Frenchman powered a header past Jerzy Dudek to complete his brace and give United the win.

Five days later, United travelled to White Hart Lane to face Tottenham Hotspur. Ruud van Nistelrooy's penalty three minutes before the interval ensured the Red Devils won consecutive FA Premier League matches for the first time in the 2004–05 season, went up to fifth in the table, and ended Spurs' unbeaten run. Van Nistelrooy, who had a goal ruled out for offside, converted after Erik Edman had fouled John O'Shea. Robbie Keane made a superb block to deny Mikaël Silvestre, and Paul Robinson saved a David Bellion header as United pushed for a second.

After a 1–1 home draw with Middlesbrough, United went up to fourth place in the Premier League table, the first time they had been in the top four in the 2004–05 season. But United went down two places to 6th after a 0–0 draw away to Birmingham City. Steve Bruce's side had chances to win, with United goalkeeper Roy Carroll denying Emile Heskey with his legs either side of the interval. United, with Wayne Rooney on the bench, rarely troubled Birmingham, but Van Nistelrooy missed the game's best opportunity after 36 minutes. He side-footed straight at goalkeeper Maik Taylor from only six yards as he raced on to Quinton Fortune's cross.

United's next game was a home game against Arsenal. United won 2–0. The match, played on 24 October 2004, is known as the Battle of the Buffet, and it ended Arsenal 49-match unbeaten run. Van Nistelrooy got the opener when he stroked in a contentious penalty after Sol Campbell's challenge on Wayne Rooney. Dennis Bergkamp and Thierry Henry had Arsenal's best chances but they were denied by good saves from United keeper Roy Carroll. Rooney slotted in from six yards to complete victory on his 19th birthday. The win helped United reduce the gap on Premier League leaders Arsenal to eight points. It also helped Van Nistelrooy avenge the taunts from Arsenal players after he missed a last-minute spot-kick in the corresponding fixture last season. United went up to 5th with this win.

United travelled to Fratton Park to face Portsmouth in their next game. It was a shock 2–0 win for Pompey. United paid the price for failing to convert any of their many chances. United had laid siege to the home side's goal early on but Pompey survived and hit back after the break. David Unsworth put them ahead from the spot after Rio Ferdinand tugged back Ricardo Fuller in the area. Cristiano Ronaldo hit the post with a header as United piled on the pressure but Yakubu finished them off when his shot deflected in off Mikaël Silvestre. It was Pompey's second successive Premier League victory over United at Fratton Park - but it looked unlikely in the early stages.

Manchester United played at home to their rivals Manchester City on 7 November 2004. The game ended 0–0. United were shut out for the second successive Premier League game by a resolute and determined City side, who offered little of an attacking threat. City survived some erratic handling from David James, while Louis Saha spurned United's best chance, heading wide from six yards. United's Alan Smith was sent off for a second bookable offence.

United travelled to St James' Park to face Newcastle United in their next FA Premier League game. Alan Shearer and Patrick Kluivert went close for Newcastle before Wayne Rooney volleyed home Darren Fletcher's cross. Shearer eventually levelled the scores with a superb individual goal after dispossessing Wes Brown. But Van Nistelrooy scored from the spot after Shay Given fouled Paul Scholes and then Rooney slotted home from close range to seal victory. The result left United in seventh place, nine points behind Arsenal and eleven behind Chelsea.

Following a 2–0 win over Charlton Athletic, in which veterans Ryan Giggs and Paul Scholes scored, United travelled to The Hawthorns to face West Bromwich Albion on 27 November. The Baggies began confidently, but were rocked by first-half injuries to Darren Moore and Cosmin Contra, forcing Bryan Robson into a double change. United broke through on 53 minutes when Scholes latched onto Giggs' back-heel and lashed home a fierce shot. Van Nistelrooy's close-range header made it 2-0, before Scholes nodded in a third.

A week after the win at The Hawthorns, United welcomed Southampton to Old Trafford. United laboured to break down a stubborn Southampton defence in a goalless first half. But Paul Scholes ended the resistance by heading home from close range early in the second half. Wayne Rooney then finished emphatically from Ryan Giggs' pass before Cristiano Ronaldo volleyed the third. With the win over the Saints, United got a fourth consecutive victory in the FA Premier League.

After a 1–1 draw against Fulham, next up against United were Crystal Palace, who travelled to Old Trafford to face United on 18 December 2004. Wayne Rooney missed a penalty for United but Paul Scholes fired in an angled shot to put them ahead. Danny Granville poked in an effort to equalise before United's Alan Smith and rival Joonas Kolkka traded headers to leave the match poised at 2-2. But Emmerson Boyce's own goal, a skilful Scholes strike and John O'Shea's shot rounded off the win.

United faced Bolton Wanderers at home in their next game, played on Boxing Day. United won 2–0. Ryan Giggs scored after just 10 minutes showing exemplary technique to steer the ball into the corner of the net. United struggled to build on the platform of their early goal, Paul Scholes making the game safe with a low shot. If Bolton were able to disrupt United's attacking rhythm for long periods, they proved less successful in troubling Roy Carroll, who had to make just one save.

Manchester United ended 2004 with a 1–0 away win over Aston Villa on 28 December. Ryan Giggs' left-foot strike in the 41st minute was enough to separate the teams after an entertaining encounter. Giggs had already forced a great save from Thomas Sørensen before his goal, although at the other end, Lee Hendrie and Liam Ridgewell saw shots saved. Villa pressed after the break and Gareth Barry came close, but Alan Smith hit the bar in the final minute.

United opened 2005 with a 2–0 away win over Middlesbrough on New Year's Day. Darren Fletcher slid the ball in after nine minutes when Mark Schwarzer was only able to parry a cross from Ryan Giggs. Before the goal, Cristiano Ronaldo had drawn an instinctive save from the Boro keeper as well as hitting the woodwork. Giggs wrapped up the points late on when he pounced on Eric Djemba-Djemba's pass and got in front of Gareth Southgate before poking the ball past Schwarzer.

On 4 January, United hosted Tottenham Hotspur in a goalless draw. Minutes before the final whistle, Spurs should have taken the lead after Pedro Mendes' effort from the halfway line was spilled into the goal by an out-of-position Roy Carroll. He pushed the ball out, but only after it had crossed the line; however, the officials were unable to tell whether a goal had been scored and allowed play to continue. United almost won in the dying seconds as a Gabriel Heinze free-kick was saved by Paul Robinson. Earlier, Spurs' Noé Pamarot almost gifted United a goal, sending an attempted clearance against the post.

Eleven days after the match with Spurs, Manchester United travelled to Anfield to face their rivals Liverpool. United won 1–0, thanks to Wayne Rooney's 21st-minute goal. Jerzy Dudek allowed Rooney's tame 25-yard shot to slide in to gift the former Everton striker a goal in front of The Kop. United deserved their victory, despite having Wes Brown sent off for two bookable offences after 64 minutes. Roy Keane hit the bar, while Fernando Morientes had a quiet debut.

After a 3–1 win over Aston Villa at Old Trafford, United travelled to Highbury to face Arsenal on 1 February. United won 4–2. Patrick Vieira headed Arsenal ahead from a corner before Ryan Giggs levelled with a deflected shot. Dennis Bergkamp restored Arsenal's lead before two goals from Cristiano Ronaldo and a John O'Shea chip ended the Gunners' long unbeaten home record. Mikaël Silvestre was sent off in a fiery game - with Vieira and Roy Keane pulled apart beforehand in the tunnel. The win pushed United up to 2nd in the FA Premier League table, their highest position in the 2004–05 season so far.

Manchester United stayed second in the Premier League table with a 2–0 home win over Birmingham City. United began promisingly, with Cristiano Ronaldo's free-kick saved by Maik Taylor and Ryan Giggs firing wide. Walter Pandiani struck the bar with a ferocious volley as the visitors threatened, while Ronaldo's mis-hit cross also came back off the upright. United captain Roy Keane took advantage of poor defending to put United ahead (his 50th goal for the Red Devils), before Wayne Rooney coolly chipped in to seal the victory.

For their next game, United travelled crosstown to face rivals Manchester City on 13 February. Wayne Rooney met Gary Neville's cross to the near post with a low shot, which went in via a deflection off Richard Dunne, to put United ahead. Seven minutes later, the unfortunate Dunne hooked a volley over David James' head and into his own net. Steve McManaman wasted City's best chance when he shot wide from three yards in the first half.

Following a 2–1 home win over Portsmouth, with Wayne Rooney scoring a brace, United travelled to Selhurst Park to face Crystal Palace in the next game, played on 5 March. The 10-man Eagles held the Red Devils to a goalless draw. Vasilios Lakis was sent off for two bookable offences after 63 minutes, but a lacklustre United failed to carve out a winner at Selhurst Park. Palace keeper Gábor Király saved well from Van Nistelrooy either side of the interval, and the Dutchman also wasted two great chances late on. Substitute Rooney was also denied by Király as Palace somehow held on.

After a 1–0 home victory over Fulham, with Cristiano Ronaldo scoring the only goal in the 21st minute, Manchester United hosted Blackburn Rovers on 2 April. The game ended as a 0–0 draw, with United's hopes of catching Premier League leaders Chelsea virtually disappearing in a frustrating stalemate. Wayne Rooney and Roy Keane hit the post in the first half as United dominated. Rooney and Mikaël Silvestre, who had a header cleared off the line by Morten Gamst Pedersen, also brought fine saves from Blackburn keeper Brad Friedel. Paul Scholes also missed a glorious chance for United, while Blackburn rarely threatened, with Pedersen heading their best chance wide.

On 9 April, Manchester United travelled to Carrow Road to face Norwich City. The game ended as a 2–0 win for the Canaries. The game almost certainly ended United's slim title hopes, and kept Norwich's Premier League survival hopes alive. Dean Ashton headed Norwich ahead from David Bentley's free-kick and crossed for Leon McKenzie to volley home. Craig Fleming and Jason Shackell were outstanding in a Canaries defence that thwarted United's subdued strikeforce. The closest the Red Devils came was when Wayne Rooney saw his injury-time shot tipped over by Norwich keeper Robert Green.

On 20 April, United travelled to Goodison Park to face Everton. United lost 1–0. Duncan Ferguson, who scored Everton's winner in their last league victory over United in 1995, headed home after 54 minutes to sink United. Alex Ferguson's men ended the game in shame as Gary Neville and Paul Scholes were sent off after the break. Neville saw red for kicking the ball at a spectator and Scholes for two fouls.

Four days after the loss at Everton, Manchester United hosted Newcastle United. The Red Devils won 2–1. Newcastle took a surprise first-half lead when Darren Ambrose pounced on Tim Howard's poor clearance. Wayne Rooney equalised in the 57th minute with a superb volley hit with the outside of his right foot, drawing gasps from the Old Trafford crowd. With time running out, Wes Brown's winner provided another surprise - it was his first goal in 117 league games. The win allowed Manchester United to close the gap on Arsenal to a point, though Arsène Wenger's side had a game in hand.

For their next game, Manchester United travelled to The Valley to face Charlton Athletic. United won 4–0. Debutant keeper Stephan Andersen made a wonder save to deny Alan Smith, but the Dane then spilled a Wayne Rooney shot, allowing Paul Scholes to fire home. Scholes set up the second, passing to Darren Fletcher, who side-footed home. Talal El Karkouri's mistake allowed Smith to add a third, with a Rooney flick sealing a fine win, while late on Charlton's Chris Perry was sent off.

United hosted West Bromwich Albion in their next game, played on 7 May 2005. The game ended 1–1. Ryan Giggs put United ahead with a free-kick after 20 minutes, fired past injured keeper Russell Hoult. Hoult, who suffered a groin injury, was replaced by Tomasz Kuszczak, who made a string of outstanding saves. The Baggies levelled after 61 minutes from Robert Earnshaw's penalty after John O'Shea fouled Geoff Horsfield.

For their next game, United hosted Chelsea. The game was played on 10 May 2005, and United lost 3–1. Van Nistelrooy's superb finish from close-range gave United an early lead, though thereafter the home side struggled to break down Chelsea. Tiago produced a wonderful equaliser, surprising Roy Carroll with an arcing shot, while his pass set up Eiður Guðjohnsen, who dinked in the second. Joe Cole added to United's misery, converting a Frank Lampard cross. The win put Chelsea on 94 points with one match to go of their 38-game season, surpassing Manchester United's record total of 92 in 1993–94, which was a 42-game campaign.

On 15 May 2005, United travelled to the South Coast to face Southampton for their final 2004–05 FA Premier League game. United won 2–1, ending Southampton's 27-year stay in the top-flight. Saints had started so well, a Graeme Le Saux corner bundled in via the thigh of Manchester United defender John O'Shea. But United responded quickly and O'Shea crossed for Darren Fletcher to head in. Van Nistelrooy pounced to nod home an Alan Smith cross to put United ahead and results elsewhere ensured the Saints finished bottom of the division. The game also meant United finished in third for the second season running.

Date	Opponents	H/A	Result F–A	Scorers	Attendance	League position
15 August 2004	Chelsea	A	0–1		41,813	17th
21 August 2004	Norwich City	H	2–1	Bellion 32', Smith 50'	67,812	8th
28 August 2004	Blackburn Rovers	A	1–1	Smith 90'	26,155	11th
30 August 2004	Everton	H	0–0		67,803	9th
11 September 2004	Bolton Wanderers	A	2–2	Heinze 44', Bellion 90'	27,766	11th
20 September 2004	Liverpool	H	2–1	Silvestre (2) 20', 66'	67,857	8th
25 September 2004	Tottenham Hotspur	A	1–0	Van Nistelrooy 42' (pen.)	36,103	5th
3 October 2004	Middlesbrough	H	1–1	Smith 81'	67,988	4th
16 October 2004	Birmingham City	A	0–0		29,221	6th
24 October 2004	Arsenal	H	2–0	Van Nistelrooy 73' (pen.), Rooney 90'	67,862	5th
30 October 2004	Portsmouth	A	0–2		20,190	7th
7 November 2004	Manchester City	H	0–0		67,863	7th
14 November 2004	Newcastle United	A	3–1	Rooney (2) 7', 90', Van Nistelrooy 74' (pen.)	52,320	7th
20 November 2004	Charlton Athletic	H	2–0	Giggs 41', Scholes 50'	67,704	6th
27 November 2004	West Bromwich Albion	A	3–0	Scholes (2) 53', 82', Van Nistelrooy 72'	27,709	4th
4 December 2004	Southampton	H	3–0	Scholes 53', Rooney 58', Ronaldo 87'	67,921	4th
13 December 2004	Fulham	A	1–1	Smith 33'	21,940	4th
18 December 2004	Crystal Palace	H	5–2	Scholes (2) 22', 49', Smith 35', Boyce 48' (o.g.), O'Shea 90'	67,814	4th
26 December 2004	Bolton Wanderers	H	2–0	Giggs 10', Scholes 89'	67,867	4th
28 December 2004	Aston Villa	A	1–0	Giggs 41'	42,593	3rd
1 January 2005	Middlesbrough	A	2–0	Fletcher 9', Giggs 79'	34,199	3rd
4 January 2005	Tottenham Hotspur	H	0–0		67,962	3rd
15 January 2005	Liverpool	A	1–0	Rooney 21'	44,183	3rd
22 January 2005	Aston Villa	H	3–1	Ronaldo 8', Saha 69', Scholes 70'	67,589	3rd
1 February 2005	Arsenal	A	4–2	Giggs 18', Ronaldo (2) 54', 58', O'Shea 89'	38,164	2nd
5 February 2005	Birmingham City	H	2–0	Keane 55', Rooney 78'	67,838	2nd
13 February 2005	Manchester City	A	2–0	Rooney 68', Dunne 75' (o.g.)	47,111	2nd
26 February 2005	Portsmouth	H	2–1	Rooney (2) 8', 81'	67,989	2nd
5 March 2005	Crystal Palace	A	0–0		26,021	2nd
19 March 2005	Fulham	H	1–0	Ronaldo 21'	67,959	2nd
2 April 2005	Blackburn Rovers	H	0–0		67,939	3rd
9 April 2005	Norwich City	A	0–2		25,522	3rd
20 April 2005	Everton	A	0–1		37,160	3rd
24 April 2005	Newcastle United	H	2–1	Rooney 57', Brown 75'	67,845	3rd
1 May 2005	Charlton Athletic	A	4–0	Scholes 34', Fletcher 44', Smith 62', Rooney 67'	26,789	3rd
7 May 2005	West Bromwich Albion	H	1–1	Giggs 21'	67,827	3rd
10 May 2005	Chelsea	H	1–3	Van Nistelrooy 7'	67,832	3rd
15 May 2005	Southampton	A	2–1	Fletcher 19', Van Nistelrooy 63'	32,066	3rd

Pos	Team	Pld	W	D	L	GF	GA	GD	Pts	Qualification or relegation
1	Chelsea (C)	38	29	8	1	72	15	+57	95	Qualification for the Champions League group stage
2	Arsenal	38	25	8	5	87	36	+51	83	Qualification for the Champions League group stage
3	Manchester United	38	22	11	5	58	26	+32	77	Qualification for the Champions League third qualifying round
4	Everton	38	18	7	13	45	46	−1	61	Qualification for the Champions League third qualifying round
5	Liverpool	38	17	7	14	52	41	+11	58	Qualification for the Champions League first qualifying round (Note: Although they failed to qualify for the Champions League as one of the top four English clubs, Liverpool were given a special dispensation to compete as the defending champions. They were, however, forced to enter in the first qualifying round.)

Rules for classification: 1) points; 2) goal difference; 3) number of goals scored.
(C) Champions

== FA Cup ==
The draw for the FA Cup third round took place on 9 December 2004, and Manchester United were given a home tie with Conference National side Exeter City. The game, played on 8 January 2005, ended 0–0, with Exeter producing a magnificent rearguard action to earn a deserved draw. United fielded a weakened side, but Conference Exeter matched the FA Cup holders to set up a lucrative replay. Exeter's former United apprentice Andy Taylor tested goalkeeper Tim Howard and fired a free-kick narrowly off target. United threatened after the break, with substitute Paul Scholes firing only inches wide deep into injury time.

For the replay, played on 19 January, United travelled to the south coast to face Exeter in the replay. United won 2–0 to spare their blushes, end brave Exeter's resistance, and set up a home tie against Middlesbrough in the Fourth Round. Cristiano Ronaldo scored the opener, slipping the ball between Paul Jones' legs after just nine minutes. United wasted a host of chances to make it safe as Jones made some great saves, but Wayne Rooney put the tie beyond doubt late on with a cool finish. Exeter had chances of their own, Sean Devine twice volleying wide and Andy Taylor forcing Tim Howard to save.

Manchester United marched into the fifth round with a 3–0 win against Middlesbrough at Old Trafford on 29 January. John O'Shea put the defending champions in front after 10 minutes from close range. Wayne Rooney then brilliantly lobbed Mark Schwarzer from 40 yards after 67 minutes to double United's lead, before firing home a stunning volley with nine minutes left. Boro's best chance came after 31 minutes, but Roy Carroll dived to save well at the feet of Boudewijn Zenden from only eight yards.

In the fifth round, Manchester United were paired with fellow FA Premier League side Everton. The game, played on 19 February 2005 at Goodison Park, ended as a 2–0 win for the Red Devils. The game saw Wayne Rooney start for United against his boyhood club. Rooney received a hostile reception, but goals in each half from Quinton Fortune and Cristiano Ronaldo silenced the jeers at Goodison Park. Fortune headed home after 23 minutes before Ronaldo scored when Nigel Martyn parried Paul Scholes' free-kick. Marcus Bent missed Everton's best chance when Roy Carroll, who was later struck by a missile, saved at his feet.

United advanced to the semi-finals of the FA Cup with a 4–0 away win against Southampton. Roy Keane put holders United on course for victory over Southampton after two minutes, scoring what turned out to be his final goal for the club, before goals either side of the interval confirmed their supremacy. Cristiano Ronaldo took advantage of good work by Wayne Rooney to score the second in first-half injury time, and Paul Scholes added a third from 12 yards in the 47th minute, then headed home four minutes from time.

Manchester United booked a place in the FA Cup Final for the second season running with a 4–1 semi-final win against fellow FA Premier League side Newcastle United at the Millennium Stadium. Ruud van Nistelrooy's flicked finish put Alex Ferguson's side ahead. A near-post Paul Scholes header doubled the lead just before half-time and Van Nistelrooy's side-foot shot confirmed the Red Devils' dominance. Shola Ameobi steered in an effort for Newcastle but Cristiano Ronaldo's shot ended their faint hopes of a comeback.

In the final, played on 21 May 2005 at the Millennium Stadium, Manchester United faced Arsenal. The game ended 0–0. Arsenal won the first ever penalty shoot-out in an FA Cup Final 5–4 after United's Paul Scholes saw his spot-kick saved by Arsenal 'keeper Jens Lehmann. United controlled almost the entire match, but were left empty-handed after Wayne Rooney hit the post and Freddie Ljungberg deflected Van Nistelrooy's header on to the bar. José Antonio Reyes was sent off before Patrick Vieira's deciding penalty. Scholes' penalty miss meant that Arsenal lifted the FA Cup, and also meant that United finished the 2004–05 season trophyless, the first time they had done so since 2001–02.

Date	Round	Opponents	H/A	Result F–A	Scorers	Attendance
8 January 2005	Round 3	Exeter City	H	0–0		67,551
19 January 2005	Round 3 Replay	Exeter City	A	2–0	Ronaldo 9', Rooney 87'	9,033
29 January 2005	Round 4	Middlesbrough	H	3–0	O'Shea 10', Rooney (2) 67', 82'	67,251
19 February 2005	Round 5	Everton	A	2–0	Fortune 23', Ronaldo 58'	38,664
12 March 2005	Round 6	Southampton	A	4–0	Keane 2', Ronaldo 45', Scholes (2) 48', 87'	30,971
17 April 2005	Semi-final	Newcastle United	N	4–1	Van Nistelrooy (2) 19', 58', Scholes 45', Ronaldo 76'	69,280
21 May 2005	Final	Arsenal	N	0–0 (a.e.t.) (4–5p)		71,876

== League Cup ==
As a Premier League club who was competing in European competition for the 2004–05 season, Manchester United entered the League Cup in the third round, where they were given an away tie with Championship side Crewe Alexandra. The game took place on 26 October 2004.

United won 3–0. Alex Ferguson made wholesale changes from the side that beat Arsenal on 24 October and Alan Smith took just ten minutes to coolly slot the visitors in front. Crewe had chances of their own, with Dean Ashton and Steve Jones testing United goalkeeper Tim Howard. But Liam Miller converted David Bellion's pass, Stephen Foster put the ball into his own net and United easily held on to ease into the next round.

The draw for the fourth round gave United a home tie with fellow FA Premier League club Crystal Palace. The game took place on 10 November 2004, and United won 2–0. Louis Saha opened the scoring in the 22nd minute, his first goal in the 2004–05 season. Saha took two Palace defenders out of the game when he chested down Quinton Fortune's cross before drilling home a low near-post drive. Kieran Richardson netted his second senior goal to double United's lead seven minutes before the interval. However Richardson enjoyed an element of luck, Palace keeper Julián Speroni letting the shot bounce under his body.

United played a home tie with fellow FA Premier League club and rivals Arsenal in the fifth round. The game took place on 1 December 2004. United won 1–0, thanks to David Bellion's very early strike. A terrible blunder by Gunners keeper Manuel Almunia saw Bellion's weak shot squirm in after a Johan Djourou slip had gifted possession to Bellion. The home side's greater experience was crucial, and both Kieran Richardson and Chris Eagles went close in the first half. Arsenal's best chance saw Tim Howard beat out Jermaine Pennant's free-kick.

In the semi-finals, United were drawn against another Premier League side Chelsea. The first leg took place at Stamford Bridge on 12 January 2005, while the second leg at Old Trafford was played two weeks later. The first leg ended as a dull goalless draw. Blues midfielder Frank Lampard twice came close, seeing a header flash wide and having a shot cleared off the line by United's Gabriel Heinze. But the Red Devils will feel aggrieved they were not given a first-half penalty after Louis Saha was brought down. After the break, Tim Howard saved from Jiří Jarošík, while Carlo Cudicini pushed away Wayne Rooney's header. The Chelsea fashioned the better chances, but were unable to break down an excellent visitors' defence. The second leg ended as a 2–1 defeat for United, knocking the Reds out of the League Cup. Lampard gave Chelsea the lead with a powerful angled shot before United's Quinton Fortune had a penalty appeal turned down. Ryan Giggs chipped in to give the Red Devils hope, but Damien Duff's 50-yard free-kick, intended as a cross, sent Chelsea through to the final.

Date	Round	Opponents	H/A	Result F–A	Scorers	Attendance
26 October 2004	Round 3	Crewe Alexandra	A	3–0	Smith 10', Miller 57', Foster 59' (o.g.)	10,103
10 November 2004	Round 4	Crystal Palace	H	2–0	Saha 22', Richardson 39'	48,891
1 December 2004	Quarter-final	Arsenal	H	1–0	Bellion 1'	67,103
12 January 2005	Semi-final; First leg	Chelsea	A	0–0		41,492
26 January 2005	Semi-final; Second leg	Chelsea	H	1–2	Giggs 67'	67,000

== UEFA Champions League ==
=== Third qualifying round ===
As they had finished 3rd in the FA Premier League the previous season, Manchester United entered the Champions League in the third qualifying round. They were paired with Romanian side Dinamo București. The first leg in Romania took place on 11 August 2004, with the second leg at Old Trafford being played a fortnight later.

In the first leg, United overcame an early scare to win 2–1. United fell behind in the 10th minute through a Quinton Fortune own goal. Just before the interval United drew level after Ryan Giggs rounded Uladzimir Haew and slid the ball into the net. United were more cohesive after the break, Alan Smith hitting the post before Angelo Alistar scored an own goal after Liam Miller had crossed.

The second leg was a more emphatic win for United, winning 3–0. Alan Smith put United ahead from close range after 47 minutes. He struck another fine finish three minutes later. Substitute David Bellion took advantage of slack defending to seal a multi-million cash jackpot for United. The result sealed a 5–1 aggregate win for United, and earned them a place in the UEFA Champions League group stage.

Date	Round	Opponents	H/A	Result F–A	Scorers	Attendance
11 August 2004	Third qualifying round First leg	Dinamo București	A	2–1	Giggs 38', Alistar 72' (o.g.)	58,000
25 August 2004	Third qualifying round Second leg	Dinamo București	H	3–0	Smith (2) 47', 50', Bellion 70'	61,041

=== Group stage ===
In the draw for the UEFA Champions League group stage, United were placed in Pot 1. This meant that they would avoid facing teams such as the holders Porto. However, they could still face the likes of Lyon and Internazionale. In the end, United were drawn with Lyon, Sparta Prague and Fenerbahçe.

United's first group game was away to Lyon, played on 15 September. The game ended 2–2. Lyon were in command at half-time, with United goalkeeper Tim Howard gifting them the lead after 34 minutes by dropping Juninho's free-kick for Cris to score. Pierre-Alain Frau fired a second after a flowing move 10 minutes later. Ruud van Nistelrooy broke Denis Law's record of 29 European goals for United with a flying header before levelling from close range on the hour. This left United in third place in the group.

United played their first home game in the group on 28 September, against Fenerbahçe. United won 6–2, with 18-year-old striker Wayne Rooney scoring a hat-trick on his debut. Ryan Giggs headed the hosts ahead before Rooney grabbed centre stage, firing in his first goal from Van Nistelrooy's precision pass. He rifled in a second from 20 yards out and scored a second-half free-kick. Márcio Nobre and Tuncay Şanlı twice reduced the deficit for the Turkish side, but late goals from Van Nistelrooy and David Bellion made sure of the result.

United's next game was away to Sparta Prague, on 19 October. The game ended 0–0. The home side were inspired by their captain, former United winger Karel Poborský, who twice brought smart saves out of Roy Carroll. Lukáš Zelenka also shot just wide for Sparta, while a Jiří Homola header was kept out by the frame of the goal.

The return game against Sparta came two weeks later at Old Trafford. Van Nistelrooy scored twice in the first half, including one from the penalty spot, but Zelenka pulled one back for the Czech side just after half-time. However, another two goals for Van Nistelrooy secured the victory as he equalled a club record for the most goals in a European match jointly held by Denis Law and Dennis Viollet. Meanwhile, Poborský was sent off late in the game for picking up two yellow cards.

In Sir Alex Ferguson's 1,000th match in charge of the club, United hosted Lyon on matchday 5, with Gary Neville opening the scoring with his second career goal in Europe inside 20 minutes. Mahamadou Diarra equalised for the visitors shortly before the break, but an eighth goal of the group stage for Van Nistelrooy secured victory and qualification for the knockout phase. Van Nistelrooy's tally equalled a Champions League group stage record set two years earlier by Hernán Crespo and Filippo Inzaghi.

United were top of the group going into their final match at Fenerbahçe, but with qualification assured, Ferguson chose to play a second-string team, with centre-back Gerard Piqué making his European debut off the bench in the second half. A hat-trick from Tuncay gave United their first defeat of the Champions League season, and combined with Lyon's 5–0 win over Sparta Prague, it meant United finished in second place in the group, to be paired with a group winner in the draw for the first knockout round.

Date	Opponents	H/A	Result F–A	Scorers	Attendance	Group position
15 September 2004	Lyon	A	2–2	Van Nistelrooy (2) 56', 61'	40,000	3rd
28 September 2004	Fenerbahçe	H	6–2	Giggs 7', Rooney (3) 17', 28', 54', Van Nistelrooy 78', Bellion 81'	67,128	1st
19 October 2004	Sparta Prague	A	0–0		20,654	2nd
3 November 2004	Sparta Prague	H	4–1	Van Nistelrooy (4) 14', 25' (pen.), 60', 90'	66,706	2nd
23 November 2004	Lyon	H	2–1	G. Neville 19', Van Nistelrooy 53'	66,398	1st
8 December 2004	Fenerbahçe	A	0–3		35,000	2nd

Pos	Team	Pld	W	D	L	GF	GA	GD	Pts	Qualification	LYO	MUN	FEN	SPP
1	(France) Lyon	6	4	1	1	17	8	+9	13	Advance to knockout stage	—	2–2	4–2	5–0
2	(England) Manchester United	6	3	2	1	14	9	+5	11	Advance to knockout stage	2–1	—	6–2	4–1
3	(Turkey) Fenerbahçe	6	3	0	3	10	13	−3	9	Transfer to UEFA Cup	1–3	3–0	—	1–0
4	(Czech Republic) Sparta Prague	6	0	1	5	2	13	−11	1		1–2	0–0	0–1	—

=== Knockout phase ===
Date	Round	Opponents	H/A	Result F–A	Scorers	Attendance
23 February 2005	First knockout round First leg	Milan	H	0–1		67,162
8 March 2005	First knockout round Second leg	Milan	A	0–1		78,957

== Squad statistics ==
No.	Pos.	Name	League		FA Cup		League Cup		Europe		Other		Total	
No.	Pos.	Name	Apps	Goals	Apps	Goals	Apps	Goals	Apps	Goals	Apps	Goals	Apps	Goals
1	GK	(United States) Tim Howard	12	0	4	0	5	0	5	0	1	0	27	0
2	DF	(England) Gary Neville	22	0	4	0	1	0	7	1	1	0	35	1
3	DF	(England) Phil Neville	12(7)	0	4(1)	0	3	0	1(5)	0	0(1)	0	20(14)	0
4	DF	(Argentina) Gabriel Heinze	26	1	4	0	2	0	7	0	0	0	39	1
5	DF	(England) Rio Ferdinand	31	0	5	0	1	0	5	0	0	0	42	0
6	DF	(England) Wes Brown	18(3)	1	6	0	3	0	6(1)	0	0	0	33(4)	1
7	FW	(Portugal) Cristiano Ronaldo	25(8)	5	6(1)	4	2	0	7(1)	0	0	0	40(10)	9
8	FW	(England) Wayne Rooney	24(5)	11	6	3	1(1)	0	6	3	0	0	37(6)	17
9	FW	(France) Louis Saha	7(7)	1	0(2)	0	4	1	0(2)	0	0	0	11(11)	2
10	FW	(Netherlands) Ruud van Nistelrooy	16(1)	6	3	2	0	0	6(1)	8	0	0	25(2)	16
11	MF	(Wales) Ryan Giggs	26(6)	6	2(2)	0	1	1	6	2	1	0	36(8)	9
12	FW	(France) David Bellion	1(9)	2	1	0	3	1	2(1)	2	1	0	8(10)	5
13	GK	(Northern Ireland) Roy Carroll	26	0	3	0	0	0	5	0	0	0	34	0
14	FW	(England) Alan Smith	22(9)	6	0(3)	0	1(1)	1	3(2)	2	1	1	27(15)	10
15	MF	(Brazil) Kléberson	6(2)	0	0	0	3	0	2(1)	0	0	0	11(3)	0
16	MF	(Republic of Ireland) Roy Keane (c)	28(3)	1	4	1	1	0	6	0	1	0	40(3)	2
17	MF	(Republic of Ireland) Liam Miller	3(5)	0	2(2)	0	2	1	3(2)	0	0	0	10(9)	1
18	MF	(England) Paul Scholes	29(4)	9	5(1)	3	1(1)	0	7	0	1	0	43(6)	12
19	MF	(Cameroon) Eric Djemba-Djemba	3(2)	0	2	0	4	0	5	0	1	0	15(2)	0
20	FW	(Norway) Ole Gunnar Solskjær	0	0	0	0	0	0	0	0	0	0	0	0
21	FW	(Uruguay) Diego Forlán	0(1)	0	0	0	0	0	0(1)	0	0(1)	0	0(3)	0
22	DF	(Republic of Ireland) John O'Shea	16(7)	2	3(1)	1	4	0	5	0	1	0	29(8)	3
23	MF	(England) Kieran Richardson	0(2)	0	1	0	3	1	1(1)	0	0(1)	0	5(4)	1
24	MF	(Scotland) Darren Fletcher	18	3	1(2)	0	3	0	3(2)	0	0(1)	0	25(5)	3
25	MF	(South Africa) Quinton Fortune	12(5)	0	5(1)	1	4	0	3(2)	0	1	0	25(8)	1
27	DF	(France) Mikaël Silvestre	33(2)	2	2(2)	0	2	0	7(1)	0	1	0	45(5)	2
28	DF	(Spain) Gerard Piqué	0	0	1	0	0(1)	0	0(1)	0	0	0	1(2)	0
29	DF	(United States) Jonathan Spector	2(1)	0	1	0	0(1)	0	1(1)	0	0(1)	0	4(4)	0
31	MF	(England) David Jones	0	0	1	0	0(1)	0	0	0	0	0	1(1)	0
33	MF	(England) Chris Eagles	0	0	1	0	1(2)	0	1(1)	0	0(1)	0	3(4)	0
35	GK	(Spain) Ricardo	0	0	0	0	0	0	0	0	0	0	0	0
40	FW	(England) Sylvan Ebanks-Blake	0	0	0	0	0(1)	0	0	0	0	0	0(1)	0
42	FW	(Italy) Giuseppe Rossi	0	0	0	0	0(2)	0	0	0	0	0	0(2)	0

== Transfers ==
United's first departure of the 2004–05 season was Mark Lynch, who signed for Sunderland on 14 July. Almost a fortnight later, Nicky Butt left United for Newcastle United after 12 years. Luke Chadwick was released six days later, while Diego Forlán left United for Villarreal after two unhappy years at Old Trafford.

In addition to the signings of Alan Smith from Leeds United and Gabriel Heinze from Paris Saint Germain at the end of 2003–04 season, United also brought in Spanish defender Gerard Piqué, Italian striker Giuseppe Rossi and English forward Wayne Rooney in the summer of 2004. They made no signings in the winter transfer window.

Departing during the winter transfer window were midfielders Bojan Djordjic and Eric Djemba-Djemba who left for Rangers and Aston Villa respectively. On 30 June, United released Northern Irish goalkeeper Roy Carroll, Welsh forward Daniel Nardiello, Spanish goalkeeper Ricardo, Republic of Ireland defender Paul Tierney and Gambian striker Arthur Gómez.

=== In ===
Date	Pos.	Name	From	Fee
1 July 2004	DF	(Spain) Gerard Piqué	(Spain) Barcelona	Undisclosed
6 July 2004	FW	(Italy) Giuseppe Rossi	(Italy) Parma	Undisclosed
31 August 2004	FW	(England) Wayne Rooney	(England) Everton	£27m

=== Out ===
Date	Pos.	Name	To	Fee
14 July 2004	DF	(England) Mark Lynch	(England) Sunderland	Free
27 July 2004	MF	(England) Nicky Butt	(England) Newcastle United	£2.5m
2 August 2004	MF	(England) Luke Chadwick	(England) West Ham United	Free
20 August 2004	FW	(Uruguay) Diego Forlán	(Spain) Villarreal	Undisclosed
27 December 2004	MF	(Sweden) Bojan Djordjic	(Scotland) Rangers	Undisclosed
31 January 2005	MF	(Cameroon) Eric Djemba-Djemba	(England) Aston Villa	£1.35m
15 June 2005	GK	(Northern Ireland) Roy Carroll	(England) West Ham United	Free
30 June 2005	FW	(Wales) Daniel Nardiello	(England) Barnsley	Free
30 June 2005	GK	(Spain) Ricardo	(Spain) Osasuna	Free
30 June 2005	DF	(Republic of Ireland) Paul Tierney	(Scotland) Livingston	Free
30 June 2005	FW	(The Gambia) Arthur Gómez	(Belgium) Dessel Sport	Free

=== Loan out ===
Date from	Date to	Position	Name	To
15 July 2004	31 May 2005	FW	(England) Eddie Johnson	(England) Coventry City
16 July 2004	30 June 2005	FW	(Wales) Daniel Nardiello	(England) Barnsley
29 July 2004	31 May 2005	MF	(Scotland) Michael Stewart	(Scotland) Hearts
18 August 2004	30 June 2005	FW	(United States) Kenny Cooper	(Portugal) Académica Coimbra
11 September 2004	31 May 2005	GK	(England) Luke Steele	(England) Coventry City
7 October 2004	7 November 2004	MF	(England) David Fox	(England) Shrewsbury Town
6 December 2004	5 January 2005	FW	(England) Colin Heath	(England) Cambridge United
21 December 2004	7 May 2005	DF	(Republic of Ireland) Paul Tierney	(England) Bradford City
23 December 2004	29 January 2005	DF	(Republic of Ireland) Paul McShane	(England) Walsall
21 January 2005	23 April 2005	MF	(England) Chris Eagles	(England) Watford
28 January 2005	5 March 2005	FW	(United States) Kenny Cooper	(England) Oldham Athletic
29 January 2005	15 May 2005	MF	(England) Kieran Richardson	(England) West Bromwich Albion
