= Arthur Gomes =

Arthur Gomes may refer to:

- Arthur Gomes (footballer) (born 1998), Brazilian footballer
- Arthur Gomes (rugby union) (born 1969), Portuguese-born French rugby union player

== See also ==
- Arthur Gómez (born 1984), Gambian former professional footballer
