= 1990–91 Football League First Division =

Association football season in England

Football League First Division
- Season: 1990–91
- Champions: Arsenal; 10th English title
- Relegated: Sunderland; Derby County
- European Cup: Arsenal
- European Cup Winners' Cup: Manchester United
- UEFA Cup: Liverpool
- Matches: 380
- Goals: 1,049 (2.76 per match)
- Top goalscorer: Alan Smith (22 goals)
- Biggest home win: Nottingham Forest 7–0 Chelsea (20 April 1991)
- Biggest away win: Derby County 1–7 Liverpool (23 March 1991)
- Highest scoring: Derby County 4–6 Chelsea (15 December 1990)
- Longest winning run: 8 matches Liverpool
- Longest unbeaten run: 23 matches Arsenal
- Longest losing run: 8 matches Queens Park Rangers

The 1990–91 Football League First Division season was the 92nd season of English top-flight football.

== Overview ==
Locations of the First Division 1990–91 teams
Greater London First Division football clubse

Arsenal took their second league title in three seasons despite a season during which it often looked as though the good points would be outnumbered by the bad points. A player brawl in a league fixture against Manchester United in October saw Arsenal have two points deducted, and a few weeks later captain Tony Adams was given a four-month prison sentence for drink-driving (he ended up serving 8 weeks). But Arsenal managed to keep up a great run of form throughout the season and were crowned league champions having lost just one league game all season long.

On 6 May 1991, Arsenal were crowned champions after beating Manchester United 3–1 while title challengers Liverpool who finished second, lost 2–1 to Nottingham Forest. Liverpool had led the table for much of the first half of the season but were shell-shocked in February by the sudden resignation of manager Kenny Dalglish. Rangers boss Graeme Souness was brought in as his successor but was unable to bring a major trophy to Anfield. Third place in the league went to Crystal Palace, who occupied their highest-ever finish, but were denied qualification for the UEFA Cup due to Liverpool being readmitted to European competition a year earlier than anticipated.

Newly promoted Leeds United had a good season back in the First Division as they finished fourth but never really looked like challenging for the title. They did, however, reach the semi-finals of the League Cup, where they lost to Manchester United. Howard Kendall returned to Everton for a second spell as manager in November, while his successor at Manchester City, Peter Reid got off to a fine start in management by guiding the Maine Road side to fifth place in the league - their highest final position for more than a decade. Wimbledon continued to defy the odds and finish above sides with greater resources with a seventh-place position in the final table.

Manchester United's league performances were too erratic for them to mount a title challenge, but they improved seven places on the previous season's final position to finish sixth, and marked a winning return to European competitions for English teams by lifting the European Cup Winners' Cup.

Tottenham Hotspur started the season well, not losing in the league until November, but a dismal second half of the season saw them finish 10th, although they did win the FA Cup for a record eighth time.

Down at the bottom end of the table, Derby County finished bottom with just five wins all season despite the 17 league goals of Welsh striker Dean Saunders, who was then sold to Liverpool. Their relegation was confirmed on 20 April 1991, after losing 2–1 at Manchester City. The final relegation place went to Sunderland on the last day of the season when they lost 3–2 to Manchester City, while Luton Town stayed up by beating already-relegated Derby County 2–0.

Sheffield United started the season disastrously, with four points from their opening sixteen matches, before getting their first win, 3–2 at home to Nottingham Forest just before Christmas. An impressive run of 13 wins from their final 22 games, including seven in a row, saw them finish well clear of the relegation zone in 13th.

Aston Villa, the previous season's runners-up, lost manager Graham Taylor when he accepted the Football Association's offer to take over as manager of the England team. Villa turned to Czechoslovak coach Jozef Venglos, the first foreign manager in the First Division, but their league form slumped and they finished 17th.

Still only 31, former England defender Terry Butcher became the youngest manager in the Football League in November when he accepted Coventry City's offer to become player-manager following the sacking of John Sillett.

=== Managerial changes ===
Team	Outgoing manager	Manner of departure	Date of vacancy	Position in table	Incoming manager	Date of appointment
Wimbledon	(England) Bobby Gould	Resigned	18 June 1990	Pre-season	(England) Ray Harford	18 June 1990
Aston Villa	(England) Graham Taylor	Signed by England	10 July 1990	Pre-season	(Czechoslovakia) Jozef Vengloš	19 July 1990
Everton	(England) Colin Harvey	Sacked	30 October 1990	17th	(England) Howard Kendall	10 November 1990
Manchester City	(England) Howard Kendall	Signed by Everton	10 November 1990	3rd	(England) Peter Reid	10 November 1990
Coventry City	(England) John Sillett	Sacked	12 November 1990	18th	(England) Terry Butcher	15 November 1990
Liverpool	(Scotland) Kenny Dalglish	Resigned	21 February 1991	1st	(England) Ronnie Moran	21 February 1991
Liverpool	(England) Ronnie Moran	End of caretaker spell	15 April 1991	2nd	(Scotland) Graeme Souness	15 April 1991
Southampton	(Northern Ireland) Chris Nicholl	Sacked	1 May 1991	14th	(England) Ian Branfoot	3 June 1991
Chelsea	(England) Bobby Campbell	Mutual consent	5 May 1991	11th	(Scotland) Ian Porterfield	6 June 1991

== League standings ==
Pos	Team	Pld	W	D	L	GF	GA	GD	Pts	Qualification or relegation
1	Arsenal (C)	38	24	13	1	74	18	+56	83 (Note: Arsenal deducted two points; Manchester United deducted one point due to a brawl in a game between both teams.)	Qualification for the European Cup first round
2	Liverpool	38	23	7	8	77	40	+37	76	Qualification for the UEFA Cup first round
3	Crystal Palace	38	20	9	9	50	41	+9	69	
4	Leeds United	38	19	7	12	65	47	+18	64	
5	Manchester City	38	17	11	10	64	53	+11	62	
6	Manchester United	38	16	12	10	58	45	+13	59	Qualification for the Cup Winners' Cup first round
7	Wimbledon	38	14	14	10	53	46	+7	56	
8	Nottingham Forest	38	14	12	12	65	50	+15	54	
9	Everton	38	13	12	13	50	46	+4	51	
10	Tottenham Hotspur	38	11	16	11	51	50	+1	49	Qualification for the Cup Winners' Cup qualifying round
11	Chelsea	38	13	10	15	58	69	−11	49	
12	Queens Park Rangers	38	12	10	16	44	53	−9	46	
13	Sheffield United	38	13	7	18	36	55	−19	46	
14	Southampton	38	12	9	17	58	69	−11	45	
15	Norwich City	38	13	6	19	41	64	−23	45	
16	Coventry City	38	11	11	16	42	49	−7	44	
17	Aston Villa	38	9	14	15	46	58	−12	41	
18	Luton Town	38	10	7	21	42	61	−19	37	
19	Sunderland (R)	38	8	10	20	38	60	−22	34	Relegation to the Second Division
20	Derby County (R)	38	5	9	24	37	75	−38	24	Relegation to the Second Division

Source: World Football
Rules for classification: 1) Points; 2) Goal difference; 3) Goals scored
(C) Champions; (R) Relegated

== Results ==
Home \ Away	ARS	AST	CHE	COV	CRY	DER	EVE	LEE	LIV	LUT	MCI	MUN	NWC	NOT	QPR	SHU	SOU	SUN	TOT	WDN
Arsenal		5–0	4–1	6–1	4–0	3–0	1–0	2–0	3–0	2–1	2–2	3–1	2–0	1–1	2–0	4–1	4–0	1–0	0–0	2–2
Aston Villa	0–0		2–2	2–1	2–0	3–2	2–2	0–0	0–0	1–2	1–5	1–1	2–1	1–1	2–2	2–1	1–1	3–0	3–2	1–2
Chelsea	2–1	1–0		2–1	2–1	2–1	1–2	1–2	4–2	3–3	1–1	3–2	1–1	0–0	2–0	2–2	0–2	3–2	3–2	0–0
Coventry City	0–2	2–1	1–0		3–1	3–0	3–1	1–1	0–1	2–1	3–1	2–2	2–0	2–2	3–1	0–0	1–2	0–0	2–0	0–0
Crystal Palace	0–0	0–0	2–1	2–1		2–1	0–0	1–1	1–0	1–0	1–3	3–0	1–3	2–2	0–0	1–0	2–1	2–1	1–0	4–3
Derby County	0–2	0–2	4–6	1–1	0–2		2–3	0–1	1–7	2–1	1–1	0–0	0–0	2–1	1–1	1–1	6–2	3–3	0–1	1–1
Everton	1–1	1–0	2–2	1–0	0–0	2–0		2–3	2–3	1–0	2–0	0–1	1–0	0–0	3–0	1–2	3–0	2–0	1–1	1–2
Leeds United	2–2	5–2	4–1	2–0	1–2	3–0	2–0		4–5	2–1	1–2	0–0	3–0	3–1	2–3	2–1	2–1	5–0	0–2	3–0
Liverpool	0–1	2–1	2–0	1–1	3–0	2–0	3–1	3–0		4–0	2–2	4–0	3–0	2–0	1–3	2–0	3–2	2–1	2–0	1–1
Luton Town	1–1	2–0	2–0	1–0	1–1	2–0	1–1	1–0	3–1		2–2	0–1	0–1	1–0	1–2	0–1	3–4	1–2	0–0	0–1
Manchester City	0–1	2–1	2–1	2–0	0–2	2–1	1–0	2–3	0–3	3–0		3–3	2–1	3–1	2–1	2–0	3–3	3–2	2–1	1–1
Manchester United	0–1	1–1	2–3	2–0	2–0	3–1	0–2	1–1	1–1	4–1	1–0		3–0	0–1	3–1	2–0	3–2	3–0	1–1	2–1
Norwich City	0–0	2–0	1–3	2–2	0–3	2–1	1–0	2–0	1–1	1–3	1–2	0–3		2–6	1–0	3–0	3–1	3–2	2–1	0–4
Nottingham Forest	0–2	2–2	7–0	3–0	0–1	1–0	3–1	4–3	2–1	2–2	1–3	1–1	5–0		1–1	2–0	3–1	2–0	1–2	2–1
Queens Park Rangers	1–3	2–1	1–0	1–0	1–2	1–1	1–1	2–0	1–1	6–1	1–0	1–1	1–3	1–2		1–2	2–1	3–2	0–0	0–1
Sheffield United	0–2	2–1	1–0	0–1	0–1	1–0	0–0	0–2	1–3	2–1	1–1	2–1	2–1	3–2	1–0		4–1	0–2	2–2	1–2
Southampton	1–1	1–1	3–3	2–1	2–3	0–1	3–4	2–0	1–0	1–2	2–1	1–1	1–0	1–1	3–1	2–0		3–1	3–0	1–1
Sunderland	0–0	1–3	1–0	0–0	2–1	1–2	2–2	0–1	0–1	2–0	1–1	2–1	1–2	1–0	0–1	0–1	1–0		0–0	0–0
Tottenham Hotspur	0–0	2–1	1–1	2–2	1–1	3–0	3–3	0–0	1–3	2–1	3–1	1–2	2–1	1–1	0–0	4–0	2–0	3–3		4–2
Wimbledon	0–3	0–0	2–1	1–0	0–3	3–1	2–1	0–1	1–2	2–0	1–1	1–3	0–0	3–1	3–0	1–1	1–1	2–2	5–1	

Legend: Blue = home team win; Yellow = draw; Red = away team win.

== Top scorers ==
Rank	Player	Club	Goals
1	(England) Alan Smith	Arsenal	22
2	(England) Lee Chapman	Leeds United	21
3	(Republic of Ireland) Niall Quinn	Manchester City	20
=	(England) John Fashanu	Wimbledon	20
5	(England) Matt Le Tissier	Southampton	19
=	(England) David Platt	Aston Villa	19
7	(United States) Roy Wegerle	Queens Park Rangers	18
8	(Wales) Dean Saunders	Derby County	17
9	(England) John Barnes	Liverpool	16
=	(Wales) Ian Rush	Liverpool	16
=	(England) David White	Manchester City	16

=== Hat-tricks ===
Player	For	Against	Result	Date	Ref
(England) Paul Gascoigne	Tottenham Hotspur	Derby County	3–0 (H)	8 September 1990	
(England) Peter Beardsley	Liverpool	Manchester United	4–0 (H)	16 September 1990	
(England) Lars Elstrup	Luton Town	Norwich City	3–1 (A)	29 September 1990	
(England) Paul Walsh	Tottenham Hotspur	Sheffield United	4–0 (H)	20 October 1990	
(Wales) Dean Saunders	Derby County	Sunderland	3–3 (H)	2 March 1991	
(England) David Platt	Aston Villa	Tottenham Hotspur	3–2 (H)	16 March 1991	
(Republic of Ireland) Niall Quinn	Manchester City	Crystal Palace	3–1 (H)	1 April 1991	
(England) Lee Chapman	Leeds United	Liverpool	4–5 (H)	13 April 1991	
(England) David White (4)	Manchester City	Aston Villa	5–1 (A)	23 April 1991	
(England) Paul Williams	Derby County	Southampton	6–2 (H)	4 May 1991	
(England) Ian Wright	Crystal Palace	Wimbledon	3–0 (A)	4 May 1991	
(England) Alan Smith	Arsenal	Manchester United	3–1 (H)	6 May 1991	
(Sweden) Anders Limpar	Arsenal	Coventry City	6–1 (H)	11 May 1991	

Note: (H) – Home; (A) – Away

== Awards ==
=== Individual awards ===
Award	Player	Club
PFA Players' Player of the Year	(Wales) Mark Hughes	Manchester United
PFA Young Player of the Year	(England) Lee Sharpe	Manchester United
FWA Footballer of the Year	(Scotland) Gordon Strachan	Leeds United
Football League First Division top scorer	(England) Alan Smith	Arsenal

PFA Team of the Year
Goalkeeper	(England) David Seaman (Arsenal)			
Defenders	(England) Lee Dixon (Arsenal)	(England) Des Walker (Nottingham Forest)	(England) Mark Wright (Derby County)	(England) Stuart Pearce (Nottingham Forest)
Midfielders	(Scotland) Gordon Strachan (Leeds United)	(England) Paul Gascoigne (Tottenham Hotspur)	(Republic of Ireland) Andy Townsend (Chelsea)	(England) John Barnes (Liverpool)
Forwards	(Wales) Mark Hughes (Manchester United)		(Wales) Ian Rush (Liverpool)	
