= Manchester United–Arsenal brawl (1990) =

Football League First Division controversy

Manchester United vs Arsenal
- Event: 1990–91 Football League First Division
| Manchester United | Arsenal |
| 0 | 1 |
- Date: 20 October 1990
- Venue: Old Trafford, Manchester
- Referee: Keith Hackett (South Yorkshire)
- Attendance: 47,232
- Weather: Mostly cloudy

On 20 October 1990, Manchester United Football Club faced Arsenal Football Club in a Football League First Division fixture at Old Trafford, during the 1990–91 season. Arsenal won by a single goal, but the game was also significant for a brawl between both teams. The Football Association (FA) took the unprecedented step of deducting league points from the two clubs.

The only goal of the match came moments before half-time, scored by Arsenal midfielder Anders Limpar. In the second half, Limpar was involved in a contest for the ball with Manchester United defender Denis Irwin; Limpar's teammate Nigel Winterburn made a tackle on Irwin that precipitated a melee between both sets of players. All but one of the twenty-two players on the field were involved; it lasted no more than 20 seconds and referee Keith Hackett booked only Limpar and Winterburn for their actions.

Manchester United and Arsenal took immediate action by fining a number of their players; Arsenal also punished their manager, George Graham. A month after the game, the FA fined both clubs £50,000 for bringing the game into disrepute. Arsenal were docked two points, one more than Manchester United as they were involved in a similar brawl against Norwich City in 1989. This did not impact on Arsenal's title challenge, however, as they went on to become league champions with just one defeat.

As of 2025, it is the only instance in English league football history in which any team has been docked points due to player misconduct. The match is considered to have instigated the rivalry between the two clubs, who competed with each other for silverware regularly through the 1990s and 2000s.

== Background ==
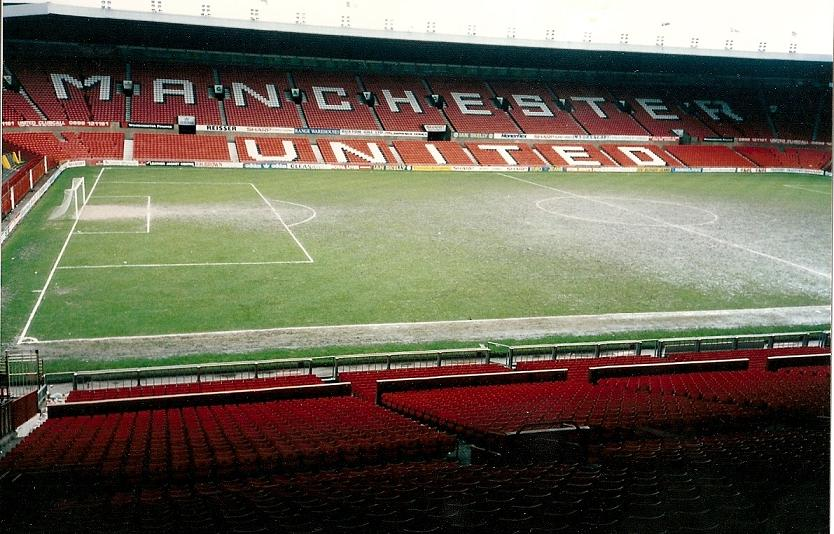
The match was played at Old Trafford, Manchester United's home stadium.

Meetings between Manchester United and Arsenal prior to this one were often eventful encounters. In Alex Ferguson's first match against Arsenal at Old Trafford in January 1987, his team prevailed with a 2–0 win to end the visitors' 22-match unbeaten run in all competitions. Arsenal's David Rocastle was sent off in the match for a foul on Norman Whiteside, which led to a confrontation between his teammates and the United coaching staff.

The following season, the teams were drawn together in the 1987–88 FA Cup fifth round for a match at Highbury. With two minutes left and Arsenal winning 2–1, United were awarded a penalty that could have forced a replay. Brian McClair hit the spot kick over the crossbar and in the aftermath, Nigel Winterburn began to taunt McClair over the miss. Arsenal had been fined £20,000 within the prior 12 months, for their players' involvement in a 19-man brawl against Norwich City in November 1989.

Both clubs entered the match in differing league form. Manchester United lost 1–0 at home to Nottingham Forest on 29 September; the winning goal was scored by Stuart Pearce in the eighth minute. It was their third league defeat of the season and first at Old Trafford in seven months. By contrast, Arsenal beat Norwich City by two goals on 6 October. Five points separated the two clubs at the start of play, with Arsenal positioned second in the league table on 18 points, behind Liverpool, and Manchester United in sixth. Ferguson assessed United's title chances in his press conference before the game: "At the moment, there is a group of six clubs behind Liverpool at the top of the table. It is up to us to keep up with that group and be ready to seize the opportunity if it presents itself."

== Match ==
=== Team selection ===
Manchester United replaced Viv Anderson in midfield with Paul Ince, while Denis Irwin reverted to right-back after a cameo in midfield. Club captain Bryan Robson was recovering from an Achilles tendon injury he aggravated playing for England at the 1990 FIFA World Cup, so Neil Webb was named as captain in Robson's place. For Arsenal, Anders Limpar recovered from a calf injury; he escaped a fine from the Swedish Football Association for failing to attend the national team's match against West Germany on 10 October. Michael Thomas was declared fit to start in midfield.

=== Summary ===
United created the first significant opportunity of the game, around the midway point of the first half, when a header from Steve Bruce was inadvertently cleared by his own teammate McClair in the Arsenal goal. In the meantime, Arsenal manager George Graham spotted that the marking in midfield was poor and instructed Limpar and Rocastle to push forward, while striker Paul Merson was given a deeper role to follow Mike Phelan. Arsenal took the lead two minutes before half-time; Limpar made a run across United's penalty area to receive Paul Davis' corner from the right hand side. United "clearly believed this was a dummy run", hence why Phelan made no attempt to challenge. Davis passed the ball short to Limpar, who turned and curled it goalwards into the penalty area with his left foot. Although goalkeeper Les Sealey "did well to get down to the ball", he was unable to hold it; referee Keith Hackett deemed the ball to have crossed the goal line and gave the goal. Ferguson offered no complaints about Hackett's decision afterwards: "The video showed quite clearly the referee was right and the ball crossed the line."

Arsenal missed a chance to double their advantage in the second half; Limpar's pass split the home side's defence and sent Rocastle chasing for the ball. He looked certain to score, but Sealey blocked his effort. United brought on Mark Robins after the 66th minute mark, "but it was essentially a gesture of desperation", said writer and journalist Brian Glanville. It reshaped their attack and meant they ran the risk of further Arsenal counter-attacks.

==== Brawl ====
"I couldn't believe what I'd just done. The worst thing of all was watching myself on television behaving very badly."

— Brian McClair on the incident.

The brawl started after the hour mark; Winterburn made a lunging tackle on Irwin, who was challenging Limpar for the ball. McClair and Irwin retaliated against Winterburn and Limpar, whom Ince pushed onto the advertising hoardings. All 11 United players and 10 Arsenal players on the pitch took part in the melee (goalkeeper David Seaman was the only player to remain uninvolved), though most were attempting to calm the situation. The fracas lasted less than 20 seconds; once it died down, Hackett booked Limpar and Winterburn for their involvement, while the United players escaped punishment. Tony Adams, praised by The Guardian correspondent Stephen Bierley for his role in defusing matters, avoided a caution for a professional foul on McClair later on.

=== Details ===
20 October 1990
15:00 BST

| Manchester United | 0–1 | Arsenal |
|---|---|---|
| | | Limpar 42' |

Old Trafford, Manchester
Attendance: 47,232
Referee: Keith Hackett (South Yorkshire)

| Manchester United | Arsenal |

| GK | 1 | (England) Les Sealey |
| RB | 2 | (Republic of Ireland) Denis Irwin | (substituted off) 79' |
| LB | 3 | (Wales) Clayton Blackmore |
| CB | 4 | (England) Steve Bruce |
| CM | 5 | (England) Mike Phelan |
| CB | 6 | (England) Gary Pallister |
| RM | 7 | (England) Neil Webb (c) |
| CM | 8 | (England) Paul Ince |
| CF | 9 | (Scotland) Brian McClair |
| CF | 10 | (Wales) Mark Hughes |
| LM | 11 | (England) Lee Sharpe | (substituted off) 66' |
Substitutes:
| FW | 12 | (England) Mark Robins | (substituted on) 66' |
| DF | 14 | (England) Lee Martin | (substituted on) 79' |
Manager:
(Scotland) Alex Ferguson

| GK | 1 | (England) David Seaman |
| RB | 2 | (England) Lee Dixon |
| LB | 3 | (England) Nigel Winterburn | (yellow card) 59' |
| CM | 4 | (England) Michael Thomas | (yellow card) 55' |
| CB | 5 | (England) Steve Bould |
| CB | 6 | (England) Tony Adams (c) |
| RM | 7 | (England) David Rocastle | | (substituted off) 77' |
| CM | 8 | (England) Paul Davis |
| CF | 9 | (England) Alan Smith |
| CF | 10 | (England) Paul Merson |
| LM | 11 | (Sweden) Anders Limpar | (yellow card) 59' |
Substitutes:
| MF | 12 | (England) Perry Groves | | (substituted on) 77' |
| DF | 14 | (Republic of Ireland) David O'Leary |
Manager:
(Scotland) George Graham

- Linesmen:
  - D. Orrell (Greater Manchester)
  - R.R. Rawson (South Yorkshire)
- Standby official: R. Byrne (Greater Manchester)

Match rules

- 90 minutes, no extra time or penalties.
- Three points awarded to winner, none to loser.
- One point awarded to each in the event of a draw.
- Two named substitutes.
- Maximum of two substitutions.

=== Statistics ===
| Statistic | Manchester United | Arsenal |
|---|---|---|
| Goals scored | 0 | 1 |
| Possession gained | 43% | 46% |
| Possession lost | 91% | 82% |
| Shots on target | 11 | 4 |
| Shots off target | 8 | 5 |
| Offsides | 6 | 7 |
| Free kicks | 14 | 18 |
| Corner kicks | 5 | 1 |
| Yellow cards | 0 | 3 |
| Red cards | 0 | 0 |

== Post-match and aftermath ==
Stuart Jones of The Times concluded in his match report that The Football Association (FA) were given no choice, "but to charge Arsenal and Manchester United with misconduct and with bringing the game into disrepute." United took immediate action by conducting an internal enquiry. Ferguson ordered his players to the training ground, where they rewatched the match. It is believed the club later fined Irwin, McClair and Ince. Arsenal followed United's example; participants Davis, Rocastle, Thomas, Limpar and Winterburn were all penalised, as well as manager Graham, who was fined £9,000. Arsenal chairman Peter Hill-Wood said of his decision: "Twice in two years is too often. The name of Arsenal has been sullied and that is why I have taken this action."

Persuaded by the European football body, UEFA, to take action, the FA summoned Hackett and the other match officials for their accounts of the brawl. Three days after the match, both clubs were formally charged. A five-man disciplinary committee later studied three video tapes of how the brawl came about and listened to the defence presented by club representatives. In November 1990, Arsenal and Manchester United were fined £50,000 each and deducted league points; Arsenal lost two points and United one.

The sides faced each other a little over a month later at Highbury in the Football League Cup fourth round. The match passed without much incident as United won the tie 6–2, with 19-year-old winger Lee Sharpe scoring a hat-trick.

At the time of the points deduction, Arsenal were placed second in the league, eight points behind leaders Liverpool and one in front of local rivals Tottenham Hotspur. O'Leary expressed his disappointment at the docked points: "The champagne will be out at Liverpool tonight because this makes our task very much harder." His teammate Limpar was more optimistic: "It seems very harsh. It makes it a little bit harder to catch Liverpool, but it is not impossible." Indeed, Arsenal went on to lose just one game all season and won the First Division title, seven points ahead of runners-up Liverpool.

Arsenal were declared league champions shortly before the reverse league fixture on 6 May 1991, a 3–1 defeat of United courtesy of an Alan Smith hat-trick, after title challengers Liverpool lost 2–1 at Nottingham Forest earlier in the day. They became England's first representatives in the European Cup, for 1991–92, since the ban imposed after the Heysel Stadium disaster of 1985 was lifted. Manchester United finished sixth, but did not end the season empty-handed, winning the 1990–91 European Cup Winners' Cup in the first season English clubs were allowed back into UEFA competitions.

According to Emma Barrow of The Daily Telegraph, the match is said to have instigated the rivalry between Arsenal and Manchester United, which continued through the 1990s and 2000s. In later years, Winterburn said of the brawl: "It probably caused a lot of the bad blood between the sides that has lasted for years but I was just competitive and desperate to win. Does it worry me? Not in the slightest. It was just one of those things that happened and is part of the history of the two clubs."

== See also ==
- Battle of Old Trafford
- Battle of the Buffet
