= Battle of the Buffet =

2004 English football match

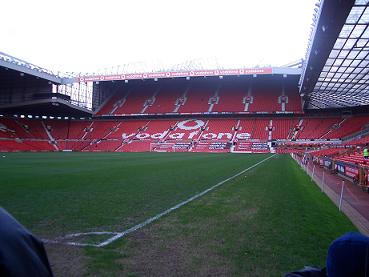
- Event: 2004–05 FA Premier League
Manchester United	Arsenal
2	0
- Date: 24 October 2004
- Venue: Old Trafford, Manchester
- Man of the Match: Rio Ferdinand (Manchester United)
- Referee: Mike Riley (West Yorkshire)
- Attendance: 67,862
- Weather: Light rain showers, Scattered clouds 14 °C (57 °F)

The "Battle of the Buffet", also known as "Pizzagate", was a Premier League match played between Manchester United and Arsenal at Old Trafford, Manchester, on 24 October 2004. Arsenal dictated much of the early play and created several openings, but as the game progressed Manchester United threatened. The home team were awarded a penalty in the 73rd minute, when Wayne Rooney was deemed to have been fouled by Sol Campbell. Ruud van Nistelrooy converted the penalty kick; Rooney also scored late in the game, making the score 2–0. The result ended Arsenal's record-breaking 49-match unbeaten run. Many Arsenal fans were disgruntled, for they believed Rooney had dived and the penalty should not have been given.

In the tunnel after the match, tempers boiled over between staff of both clubs, and amid the brawl, a slice of pizza was thrown at Manchester United manager Sir Alex Ferguson. Arsenal midfielder Cesc Fàbregas, then 17 years old, was reported to be the culprit, which he admitted in 2017. Arsenal manager Arsène Wenger was furious in his post-match briefing, criticising referee Mike Riley for his performance and describing Van Nistelrooy as a cheat. His comments were investigated by The Football Association, who later fined him £15,000 for improper conduct. Van Nistelrooy was retroactively banned for three matches, for a challenge on Ashley Cole that was missed by Riley.

The result was pivotal in the league season and in the rivalry between the two clubs. Arsenal's form suffered as a result; having entered the match as league leaders, they found themselves five points behind Chelsea in December. Manchester United struggled for consistency and finished behind Arsenal in third. Both clubs later met each other in the League Cup quarter-finals and the FA Cup final. Ferguson, following his retirement in 2013, said that he considered the "Battle of the Buffet" to be a watershed moment for Wenger, as it disorientated his management and put a strain on their relationship.

== Background ==
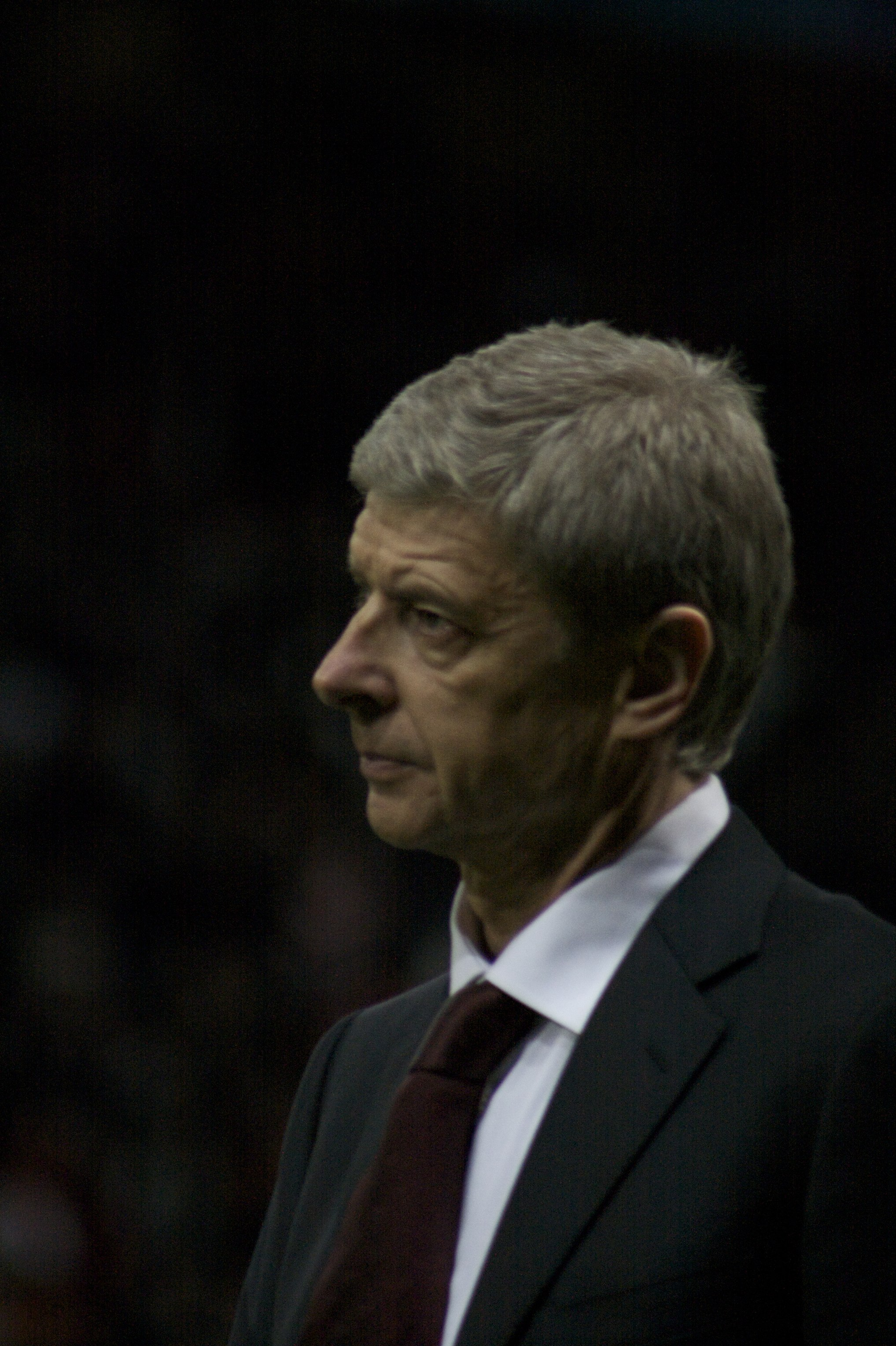
Arsène Wenger managed Arsenal to an unbeaten league season in 2003–04.

The appointment of Arsène Wenger as manager of Arsenal in 1996 brought about a successful period for the club. In Wenger's first full season, 1997–98, Arsenal won the Premier League and FA Cup to complete a domestic double. Though the club failed to win another trophy in the next three seasons, they vied for domestic honours with Sir Alex Ferguson's Manchester United. Arsenal won their second double in 2001–02, before Manchester United regained the league the following season. In 2003–04, Arsenal won the league without a single defeat – a record of 26 wins and 12 draws.

Meetings between Arsenal and Manchester United were considered the pinnacle of English football during the 2000s; journalist Paul Wilson wrote in his preview of the October 2004 match: "Their rivalry is not simply about winning trophies, it is an adornment to the wider game." The matches were also popular amongst British viewers – a league game between the two in April 2003 was watched by 3.4 million viewers in Britain, making it the top-rated programme on multi-channel television for that week. Sky Sports football summariser Andy Gray said of the encounters: "In some ways it's maybe not surprising that our major clashes have been with United and Arsenal. They've been the Premiership's two dominant clubs and so the pressure is greatest on them."

The equivalent fixture a year earlier was a goalless draw, notable for Manchester United striker Ruud van Nistelrooy missing a last-minute penalty. A confrontation involving the striker and several Arsenal players, in particular Martin Keown, immediately occurred. The ill feeling was originally sparked by an incident between Van Nistelrooy and Patrick Vieira. Having been fouled by Van Nistelrooy, Vieira aimed a kick in retaliation; although the kick did not make contact, he was still sent off for a second bookable offence. Van Nistelrooy was accused by both Vieira and Wenger of feigning contact to get his opponent sent off, while Ferguson defended his player and denied he had dived. In the wake of the match, four Arsenal players received bans after the incident and were given fines totalling £275,000 by the Football Association (FA). Two Manchester United players were also fined for improper conduct, with a third warned about his future behaviour. The 2003 match was originally labelled the "Battle of Old Trafford" by the British press.

== Pre-match ==
Arsenal entered the match as league leaders, two points in front of second-placed Chelsea. Their previous league outing was a 3–1 win against Aston Villa on 16 October 2004. The victory extended Arsenal's unbeaten league run to 49 matches, which set a new English football record. On the same day, Manchester United played out a 0–0 draw against Birmingham City. United sat in sixth position, 11 points behind their opponents. Their inconsistency was documented by several newspapers in the build-up to the match; David Lacey wrote in The Guardian of 23 October 2004: "Manchester United, it is said, are in a period of transition but if by Christmas they have not begun to pick up, their critics will begin to wonder at what precise point does transition become decline."

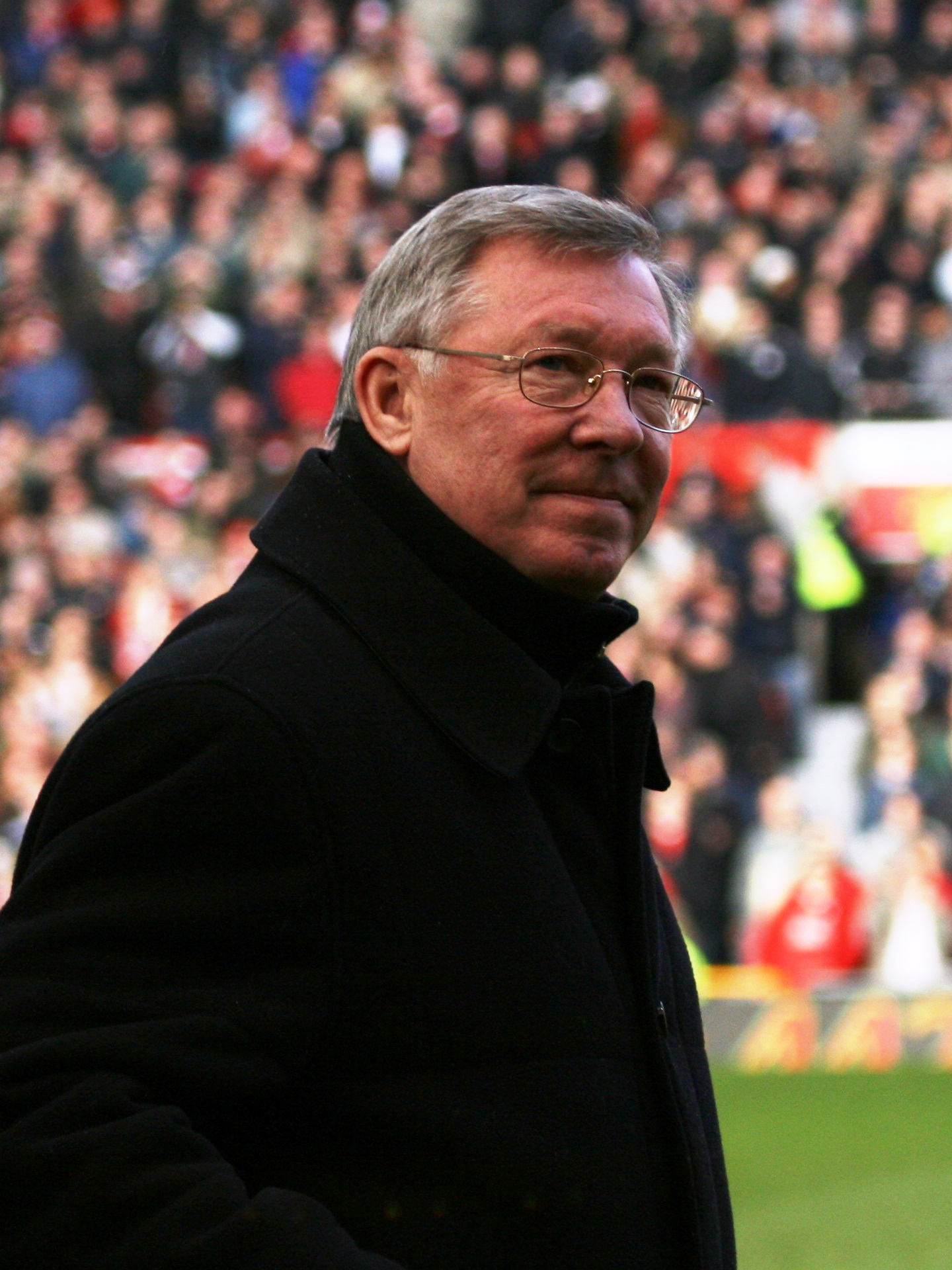
Sir Alex Ferguson was highly critical of Arsenal's behaviour before the match.

The significance of the fixture for the two clubs was increased by the fact that, had Arsenal avoided defeat, they would have extended their unbeaten league run to 50 matches. Wenger told reporters at his press conference that he felt no increased pressure, though added the team's midweek draw in the UEFA Champions League at Panathinaikos increased expectation. He admitted his team's behaviour in the fixture last season was unacceptable, but pointed out "... the best response we gave was to win the fair play table. That meant we took responsibility for what we did and we have improved our attitude." Wenger believed United's strengths lay in creativity, and did not want to set his team out to nullify, rather to "... play our game based on speed and technique."

In the lead-up to the match, Ferguson criticised Arsenal's previous conduct at Old Trafford and likened their behaviour to that of a mob: "What Arsenal players did that day was the worst thing I've seen in this sport. No wonder they were so delighted at the verdicts." He described the game as must win given Arsenal's points advantage, but highlighted it was still all to play for given the league leaders needed to play several top teams twice. Although Ferguson praised Arsenal's unbeaten run, he disputed whether this heralded a shift of power in English football: "[We] are still the team every club wants to beat most of all – regardless of who is champions or unbeaten records. In that respect, our profile as the major club in the country is untouchable. That is obvious and will never change."

Mike Riley was selected as the referee for the match; the Yorkshire-based official and England's representative referee at Euro 2004 had sent off five players in his last six games. Such was the concern another brawl would take place, Greater Manchester Police officers spoke to Riley to underline the need for players to behave themselves.

The most recent meeting between the two teams was in the FA Community Shield on 8 August 2004, when Arsenal won 3–1. Manchester United beat Arsenal en route to winning the FA Cup the previous season and were undefeated against their league opponents in almost two years.

== Match ==
=== Team selection ===
Manchester United were predicted to line up in a 4–4–1–1 formation, with Wayne Rooney positioned just behind Van Nistelrooy. Club captain Roy Keane was doubtful as he was recuperating from a virus which prevented him from training all week. Quinton Fortune and Ole Gunnar Solskjær were both ruled out with knee injuries. Arsenal were expected to line up slightly different to Manchester United, with Thierry Henry and José Antonio Reyes as the two centre-forwards in a traditional 4–4–2 formation. Vieira was expected to return to the starting XI; earlier in the week Wenger rated his chances of playing as "80 per cent" after he sprained his ankle against Aston Villa. Gilberto Silva, Jérémie Aliadière, Gaël Clichy and Manuel Almunia were all ruled out by injury for Arsenal.

When the teamsheets were released, Wenger's selection showed Dennis Bergkamp as the preferred striking partner to Henry; Reyes was positioned on the left wing which meant Robert Pires started the match on the substitutes' bench. For Manchester United, there was no place for Keane in the squad, so Ferguson brought in Phil Neville to partner Paul Scholes in central midfield.

=== Summary ===
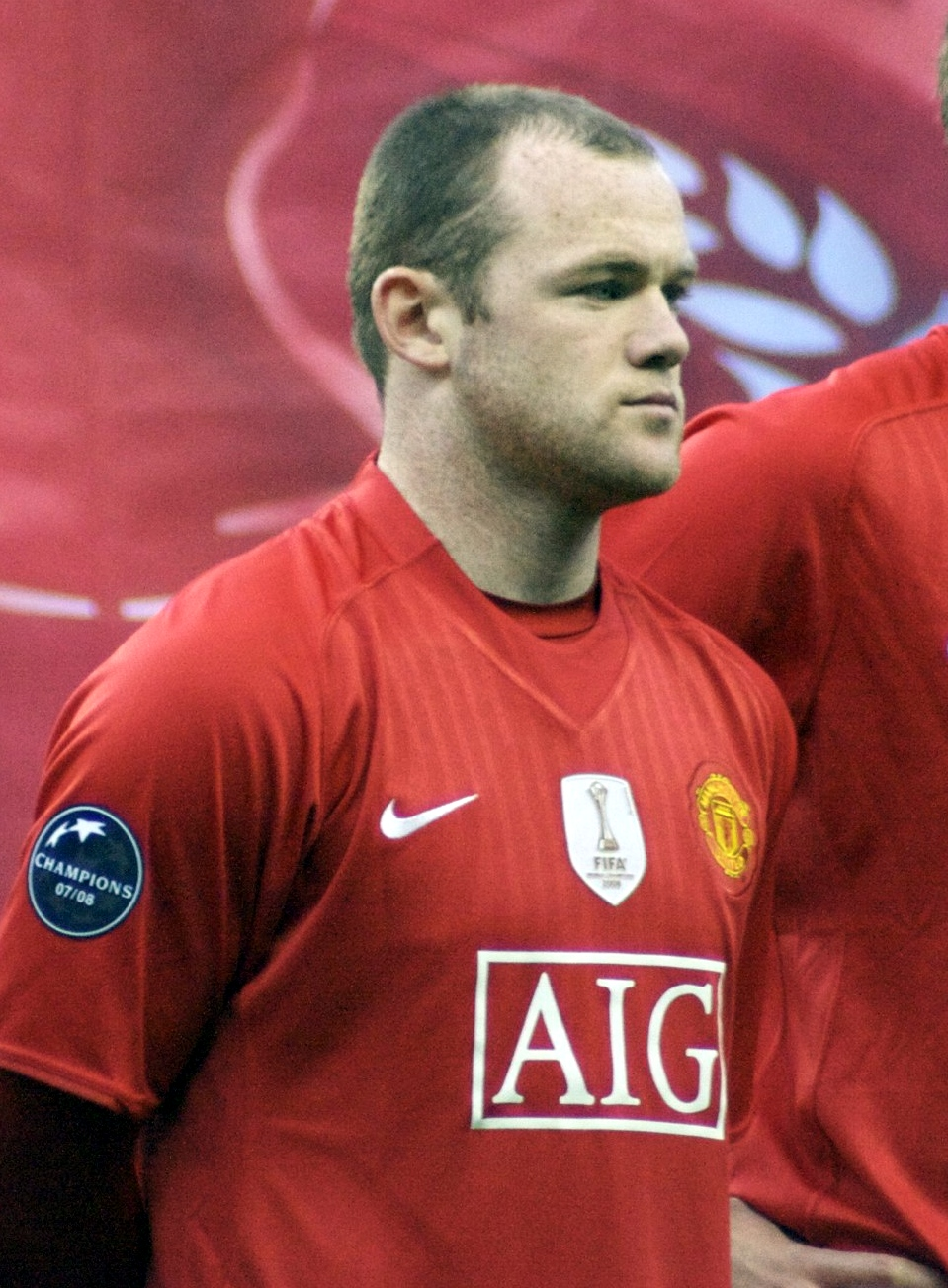
Wayne Rooney won the penalty kick for Manchester United's first goal, and scored the second.

The match began as a scrappy affair, with plenty of challenges and little expansive football on show. The game's first notable chance went to Rooney, but Kolo Touré intervened and blocked his effort. Rooney then played in Giggs, whose shot was closed down by Sol Campbell. It took a while before Arsenal gained composure and played their usual passing game, and a move involving Edu and Freddie Ljungberg in the 19th minute resulted in Rio Ferdinand carelessly tackling the latter. Ferdinand was not shown a card for his challenge – the first controversial decision referee Riley made during the match, which surprised Arsenal as the defender made a professional foul to prevent Ljungberg running clear on goal. Bergkamp exchanged passes with Reyes to open up the United defence, but the Dutchman's shot was saved by Roy Carroll. The United goalkeeper was on hand to save Henry's low shot three minutes before the break, after the striker was put through by Edu. During the first half action, both Neville brothers (Gary and Phil) were booked for fouling Reyes. Ashley Cole also received a yellow card for his tackle on Rooney. The Arsenal defender was on the receiving end of a challenge by Van Nistelrooy minutes after, as he attempted to shield the ball and hold on to possession. Television replays showed Van Nistelrooy ran his studs down Cole's shins, but the striker was not punished by Riley despite the action being in full view of his assistant at the touchline.

Arsenal continued to dominate possession once the second half got underway, but struggled to use it to their advantage. Lauren's cross from the right was cleared away by the United defence and Henry moments later miscued his effort aimed at goal. Moments later Ljungberg beat his marker and crossed the ball into the penalty area, only for Bergkamp to drag his shot wide. United threatened once the game reached the hour mark, winning duels and earning set-pieces. Gabriel Heinze's shot from about 20 yards tested Arsenal goalkeeper Jens Lehmann in the 65th minute. Five minutes later Wenger substituted Reyes off in place of Pires.

The most controversial decision of the match came in the 73rd minute as it led to the opening goal. Touré's clearance presented United the chance to break in numbers and Rooney, at the heart of their attack, reached the penalty area only to go down under Campbell's challenge. Riley awarded United a penalty, despite Campbell seeming to withdraw from the tackle and Rooney "... already heading for the turf as the defender pulled his foot away," wrote Kevin McCarra in his match report for The Guardian. Van Nistelrooy converted his penalty kick, sending Lehmann the wrong way to give United the lead. Arsenal responded hastily, but looked more susceptible to United's counter-attacks. Cole's sliding tackle on Cristiano Ronaldo near the penalty area was deemed acceptable by Riley, as he waved away appeals for another penalty. The defender came close to equalising minutes before the end, but for his shot to go wide. In stoppage time, United added their second goal of the match as substitutes Louis Saha and Alan Smith combined to set up Rooney, who finished a counter-attacking move with a tap-in past Lehmann.

=== Details ===
24 October 2004
16:05 BST

Manchester United	2–0	Arsenal
Van Nistelrooy 73' (pen.); Rooney 90+3'	PL Report; BBC Report

Old Trafford, Manchester
Attendance: 67,862
Referee: Mike Riley (West Yorkshire)

Manchester United	Arsenal

GK	13	(Northern Ireland) Roy Carroll
RB	2	(England) Gary Neville	(yellow card) 36'
CB	5	(England) Rio Ferdinand (c)
CB	27	(France) Mikaël Silvestre
LB	4	(Argentina) Gabriel Heinze
RM	7	(Portugal) Cristiano Ronaldo		(substituted off) 85'
CM	3	(England) Phil Neville	(yellow card) 38'
CM	18	(England) Paul Scholes
LM	11	(Wales) Ryan Giggs
CF	8	(England) Wayne Rooney
CF	10	(Netherlands) Ruud van Nistelrooy		(substituted off) 90+1'
Substitutes:
GK	1	(United States) Tim Howard
DF	6	(England) Wes Brown
MF	17	(Republic of Ireland) Liam Miller
FW	9	(France) Louis Saha		(substituted on) 90+1'
FW	14	(England) Alan Smith		(substituted on) 85'
Manager:
(Scotland) Sir Alex Ferguson

GK	1	(Germany) Jens Lehmann
RB	12	(Cameroon) Lauren
CB	23	(England) Sol Campbell
CB	28	(Ivory Coast) Kolo Touré
LB	3	(England) Ashley Cole	(yellow card) 35'
RM	8	(Sweden) Freddie Ljungberg
CM	4	(France) Patrick Vieira (c)	(yellow card) 75'
CM	17	(Brazil) Edu	(yellow card) 79'
LM	9	(Spain) José Antonio Reyes		(substituted off) 70'
CF	10	(Netherlands) Dennis Bergkamp
CF	14	(France) Thierry Henry
Substitutes:
GK	13	(England) Stuart Taylor
DF	18	(France) Pascal Cygan
MF	7	(France) Robert Pires		(substituted on) 70'
MF	15	(Spain) Cesc Fàbregas
FW	11	(Netherlands) Robin van Persie
Manager:
(France) Arsène Wenger

Man of the match

- Rio Ferdinand (Manchester United)

Match rules

- 90 minutes, plus stoppage time as deemed by the referee.
- Five substitutes named.
- Maximum of three substitutions.

=== Statistics ===
2004–05 Premier League top five – as of 24 October 2004
Pos	Team	Pld	W	D	L	GF	GA	GD	Pts
1	Arsenal	10	8	1	1	29	10	+19	25
2	Chelsea	10	7	2	1	12	2	+10	23
3	Everton	10	7	1	2	13	9	+4	22
4	Bolton Wanderers	10	5	3	2	16	12	+4	18
5	Manchester United	10	4	5	1	11	7	+4	17

Statistic	Manchester United	Arsenal
Goals scored	2	0
Possession	48.3%	51.7%
Passing success	75.6%	77.2%
Territorial advantage	41.1	58.9
Shots on target	5	1
Shots off target	5	7
Blocked shots	2	4
Fouls	20	24
Tackles	58	61
Tackling success	46.6%	49.2%
Corner kicks	3	3
Offsides	2	1
Yellow cards	2	3
Red cards	0	0

== Post-match ==
=== "Pizzagate" ===
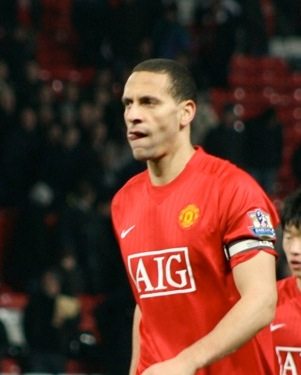
Rio Ferdinand was chosen as man of the match, a decision that angered some Arsenal players.

Campbell was seen refusing to shake Rooney's hand at the final whistle and there were no customary shirt swaps between both sets of players; it was alleged that the Arsenal players wore T-shirts emblazoned with "50 not out", though this has never been proven. Tempers boiled over in the players' tunnel in front of police officers. Several Arsenal players were held back, one of whom was Henry, incensed that Ferdinand claimed the man-of-the-match award. The conflict sparked into life when Wenger confronted Van Nistelrooy as he was unhappy with the striker's challenge on Cole. Ferguson intervened and told Wenger to leave his players alone, but the Arsenal manager faced him and said "What do you want to do about it?"

There were accusations that certain foodstuffs – usually reported as pizza, but occasionally reported as coffee, tomato soup or pea soup – had been thrown at Ferguson by an unknown Arsenal player. Ferguson changed into the club tracksuit in order to carry out his television duties. Speculation that the player who threw the pizza was Cesc Fàbregas arose when Cole hinted that the culprit was neither English nor French. In his autobiography, Ferguson said: "They say it was Cesc Fàbregas who threw the pizza at me but, to this day, I have no idea who the culprit is." Fàbregas confirmed he did throw the pizza on an episode of A League of Their Own, broadcast in October 2017.

Manchester United refused to publicly criticise Arsenal's behaviour, but the players and staff were said to be "shocked and disgusted." Riley did not mention the tunnel fracas in his match report which was sent to the FA, but the governing body revealed their intention to shed light on the matter. An investigation however was made difficult given the fact that both clubs remained quiet over "Pizzagate" and no camera footage was made available.

"This slice of pizza came flying over my head and hit Fergie straight in the mush. The slap echoed down the tunnel and everything stopped - the fighting, the yelling, everything. All eyes turned and all mouths gawped to see this pizza slip off that famous puce face and roll down his nice black suit. I thought Ferguson was going to explode but then he stormed off into the dressing room cursing and grunting, brushing the crumbs and stains off his collar. We all went back into the dressing room and fell about laughing. All I can say is that the culprit wasn't English or French, so that should narrow it down."

— Ashley Cole

=== Reaction ===
Wenger was highly critical of Riley's performance, claiming he "... decided the game, like we know he can do at Old Trafford." The Arsenal manager claimed that Rooney told his players that he felt no contact, but the referee made the decision to give Manchester United a penalty which he called the turning point of the match. Wenger used statistics to question Riley's impartiality – of the referee's last eight matches at Old Trafford, he awarded eight penalties to the home team. Wenger was not surprised at United's rough treatment of Reyes – "That's what they always try against us when they're in a difficult situation" and accused Van Nistelrooy of being a cheat in his post-match television interview. Vieira, like his manager, was disappointed in Riley's handling of the match, but sought positives: "We're still eight points clear of United and two points clear of Chelsea. We're in a really good position and all the other teams would want to be in our position."

Ferguson described the win as an important victory, and hoped it would mark a turning point in their season. Ferguson said he did not see whether Campbell brought down Rooney and sympathised with the referee as he was put under pressure: "The referee had an impossible job. It seemed like Patrick Vieira was in charge for much of the match, he was at the ref's side so much." When asked if Manchester United could close the gap on Arsenal, the Manchester United manager responded, "Yes, of course we can."

"We can only master our own performance, not the referee's performance. We got the usual penalty awarded against us when we come to Manchester United and they are in difficulty. It happened last season and it's happened again."

— Arsène Wenger, October 2004

The match attracted fervent debate amongst journalists, pundits and football players alike. Former referee Jeff Winter defended Riley's performance and described fixtures between Manchester United and Arsenal as "impossible" to manage. Premier League refereeing chief Keith Hackett added: "We know this is one of the tough encounters of the season. Mike clearly had a game plan to try not to suppress the match. He wanted it to breathe and perhaps went in with the intention of getting through the game without having to dismiss any players. In the back of his mind was trying to get through a game without having a blow-up and I think Mike did extremely well to keep a lid on things."

Rooney himself would later deny the accusations, saying "I have never intentionally tried to dive. There have been times when I've tried to stay on my feet to get the shot off rather than going down." Alan Hansen suggested Arsenal's defeat was a great result for their rivals, but felt they were strong favourites to win the league. He praised Ferguson for getting his tactics right, and lauded the performances of defenders Ferdinand and Campbell. On Match of the Day 2, Hansen was critical of Van Nistelrooy's tackle on Cole, calling it "nasty and cynical", with van Nistelrooy saying it was a 50/50 challenge.

Henry Winter writing for The Daily Telegraph gave a brief explanation as to why Arsenal did not perform – their striker Henry was "not at the races." He was full of praise of United's determination and summarised: "Yet though Arsenal had dominated possession, United had offered the more impressive individuals." Matt Dickinson of The Times described the victory as huge for "Ferguson and his faltering squad," regardless of the scoreline or indeed if Arsenal had played the better football in patches. The Guardian correspondent Kevin McCarra felt aggrieved in the manner Arsenal had ended their unbeaten run, but pointed out they were fortunate no action was taken when Cole fouled Ronaldo. He closed his piece with an illustration of how impressive Arsenal's run was: "In those prior 49 games they had never even been behind in the closing 20 minutes."

Two days after the match Van Nistelrooy was charged with serious foul play after his challenge on Cole went unnoticed by the referee. He pleaded guilty to the offence and received a three-match ban for his conduct during the match. Wenger was found guilty of an improper conduct charge and later fined £15,000 by the FA for his post-match comments about Van Nistelrooy. Ferguson accused Henry of "serious foul play" on Heinze, but the striker escaped an FA investigation and probable three-match ban as the manager's complaint was not submitted on time.

== Aftermath and legacy ==
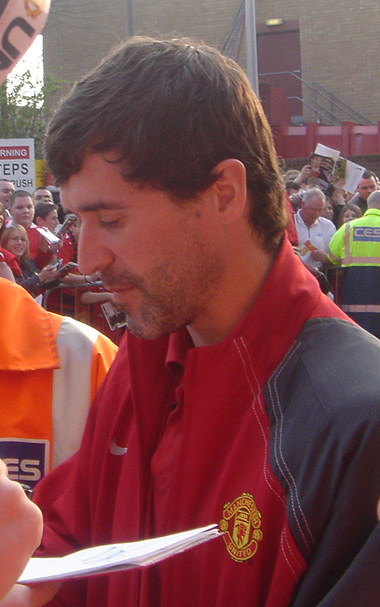
Roy Keane was involved in a fracas in the Highbury tunnel with Arsenal captain Patrick Vieira.

Arsenal struggled to regain the same level of consistency shown earlier in the season; in the space of a month they fell five points behind leaders Chelsea, who went on to win the league. Manchester United remained inconsistent; they lost to Portsmouth in their next game and ended the season in third place behind Arsenal, despite looking likely to finish runners-up.

In the League Cup, the clubs met in the quarter-final stage at Old Trafford in December and even though both sides fielded weakened teams, the match was not short of drama. David Bellion gave Manchester United the lead in just 19 seconds but it was not until the start of the second half that tempers began to flare. A fracas between Robin van Persie and Kieran Richardson, following a late tackle on Richardson by Van Persie, resulted in clashes from both sets of players, which concluded with both protagonists getting booked by match official Mark Halsey. The game finished 1–0.

In January 2005, both managers were embroiled in a new row over the events of "Pizzagate". Ferguson said Wenger never apologised to his players for calling them cheats, or for his team's behaviour, adding: "It's a disgrace, but I don't expect Wenger to ever apologise, he's that type of person." Wenger responded by claiming Ferguson was guilty of "bringing the game into disrepute" and telling reporters he would "never answer any questions any more about this man." Under pressure from the police, the Sports Minister Richard Caborn and Premier League chairman Richard Scudamore, both managers later agreed to tone down their words.

Manchester United captain Roy Keane infamously confronted Vieira in the players tunnel before the return fixture later in the season, which United won 4–2 at Highbury. This came about by an incident during the pre-game warm up when Vieira had allegedly pushed Gary Neville after confronting the player about the challenges Pires suffered at Old Trafford earlier in the season. Once Keane found out back in the United dressing room, he unleashed a verbal tirade on Vieira including telling the Arsenal skipper "I'll see you out there". The match that followed was another ill-spirited affair with both sides guilty of harsh challenges, which also saw Mikaël Silvestre sent off after a clash with Ljungberg. United went on to win the game, coming from behind twice before holding onto the lead, despite being reduced to 10 men for the last third of the match.

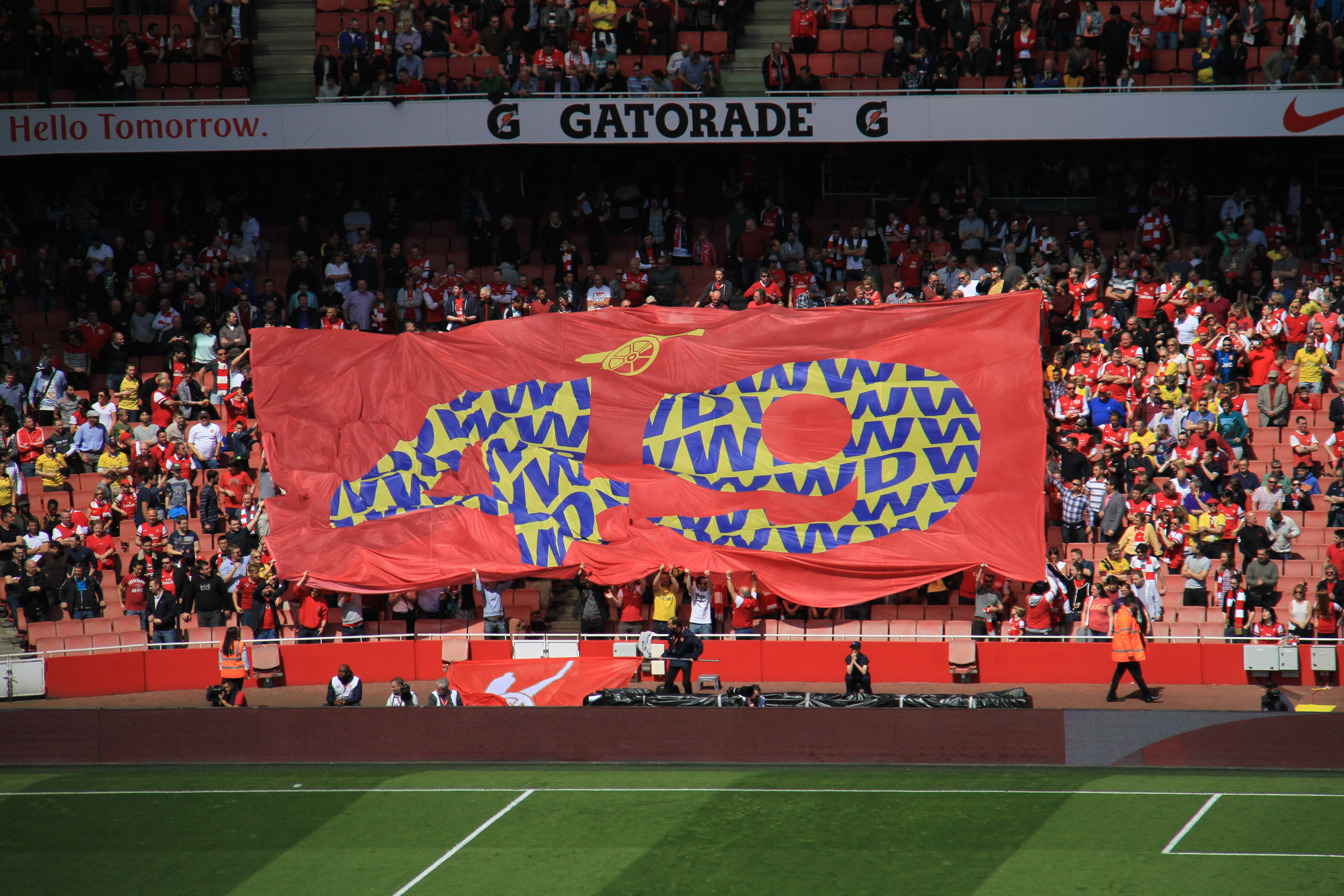
Arsenal fans parading a banner commemorating the 49-game unbeaten run, in 2014.

The teams then faced each other once more in the FA Cup Final at the end of the season. The match was largely uneventful as it finished 0–0 after normal and extra time thus taking it to a penalty shoot-out, the first in Cup Final history. Scholes missed his penalty for Manchester United, and Vieira converted the decisive kick to win the cup for Arsenal. Reyes became the second player to be sent off in the Cup Final, after Kevin Moran of United in 1985, following his second yellow card in the 120th minute.

The "Battle of the Buffet" is regarded as a historic moment in the rivalry between Manchester United and Arsenal. Ferguson in his autobiography reflected it as the point where his relationship with Wenger started to break down, and it was not until United's Champions League semi-final victory over Arsenal in 2009 that they were on talking terms. He added: "It seemed to me that losing the game scrambled Arsène's brain." When asked to recollect his version of events of "Pizzagate", Wenger admitted his team's conduct was aggressive and said: "I think on that day, [Riley] had not his best day and that brought a lot of frustration on."

The emergence of Chelsea and transitions undergone by the two clubs during the mid-2000s meant the rivalry became less fractious.

== See also ==
- Manchester United F.C.–Arsenal F.C. brawl (1990)
