= Arthur Gómez =

Gambian footballer

Personal information
- Date of birth: 12 February 1984 (age 42)
- Place of birth: Banjul, Gambia
- Height: 1.78 m (5 ft 10 in)
- Position: Striker

Senior career*
Years	Team	Apps	(Gls)
2000–2001	Banjul Hawks	12	(6)
2001–2005	Manchester United	0	(0)
2002–2005	→ Royal Antwerp (loan)	44	(12)
2005–2006	Dessel Sport	0	(0)
2006–2007	Henan Construction	25	(8)
2009–2011	Engordany		

International career
2002	Gambia U20	3	(2)
2001–2003	Gambia	9	(2)
- * Club domestic league appearances and goals as of 30 August 2009

Arthur Gómez (born 12 February 1984) is a Gambian former professional footballer who played as a striker.

== Club career ==
Born in Banjul, Gómez began his playing career at a non league team called London United F.C which is based in Serekunda London Corner, then was signed by Hawks Football Club. Gómez joined Manchester United in July 2001. Having played internationally at a young age, the English club had spotted him and he was soon a part of the youth ranks. Gómez was recommended to United by Swedish club Göteborg.

Gómez was quickly sent on loan to Royal Antwerp FC in the Jupiler League from the 2002–03 season to the 2004–05 season before joining Dessel Sport for the 2005–06 season. After taking no part in the team he soon left and moved to the Chinese giants Henan Construction for the 2006 season. He left Henan after two seasons. He was signed on a trial contract by Newport County in August 2011, but they chose not to sign him on a permanent basis.

== International career ==
Gómez scored twice for the Gambia national team against South Africa in a friendly tournament in 2001. His last appearance for Gambia was in 2003, when they visited Senegal in Dakar for an African Cup qualifying match.

== Honours ==
Henan Construction

- China League One: 2006
