= Michael Ryan =

Michael or Mike Ryan may refer to:

== Arts and entertainment ==
- Michael M. Ryan (1929–2017), American actor best known for his role as John Randolph on Another World
- Rocky Ryan or Michael Ryan (1937–2004), British media hoaxer
- Michael Ryan (broadcaster) (born 1944), presented RTÉ's Nationwide programme for many years
- Michael Ryan (poet) (born 1946), American poet
- Mike Ryan (musician) (born 1988), country music artist from Texas
- Michael Ryan (British actor) (active since 1998), British actor featuring in Kelly + Victor and Serena
- Michael Ryan (artist) (active since 2004), comic book artist on various American comics, including Runaways
- Mike S. Ryan (fl. 2006–2007), American film producer

== Politics ==
- Michael Patrick Ryan (1825–1893), Irish-born Quebec businessman and political figure
- Michael J. Ryan (Philadelphia politician) (1862–1943), president of the United Irish League of America
- Michael J. Ryan (Irish politician) (died 1952), Irish barrister, professor and politician

== Sports ==
=== Association football (soccer) ===
- Mike Ryan (footballer, born 1930) (1930–2006), English footballer for Lincoln City and York City
- Mike Ryan (soccer coach) (1935–2012), Irish-American soccer coach
- Mike Ryan (footballer, born 1979), English footballer for Wrexham

=== Baseball ===
- Mike Ryan (third baseman) (1868–1935), American baseball player
- Mike Ryan (catcher) (1941–2020), American baseball player
- Michael Ryan (baseball) (born 1977), America baseball outfielder

=== Hurling ===
- Michael Ryan (hurler, born 1955), retired Irish hurler and manager of the Westmeath hurling team
- Michael Ryan (hurler, born 1970), retired Irish hurler and manager of the Tipperary hurling team

=== Other sports ===
- Michael Ryan (hurdler) (1941–2017), Australian Olympic hurdler
- Michael J. Ryan (runner) (1889–1971), winner of the 1912 Boston Marathon
- Mike Ryan (runner) (born 1941), former New Zealand marathon and long-distance runner
- Michael Ryan (fencer) (born 1943), Irish Olympic fencer
- Michael Ryan (equestrian) (born 1976), Irish Olympic equestrian
- Michael Ryan (ice hockey) (born 1980), American ice hockey forward
- Michael Ryan (rugby league) (born 1981), Australian rugby league player for the Brisbane Broncos

== Others ==
- Michael Ryan (printer) (1784-1830), Canadian publisher and editor of the Barbados Globe.
- Michael Ryan (physician) (1800–1840), British physician and author
- Michael Clarkson Ryan (1820–1861), American attorney who was one of eight founders of Beta Theta Pi
- Michael Kennedy Ryan (1868–1925), Irish Catholic priest, teacher and supporter of the Gaelic Athletic Association
- Michael P. Ryan (USMC) (1916–2005), US Marine Corps general
- Michael E. Ryan (born 1941), former Chief of Staff of the US Air Force
- Michael D. Ryan (1945–2012), associate justice of the Arizona Supreme Court
- Michael W. Ryan (1948–2015), death row inmate in Nebraska
- Michael Ryan (chef) (born 1953), Irish Michelin starred head chef of Arbutus Lodge
- Michael Ryan (mass murderer) (1960–1987), perpetrator of the Hungerford massacre
- Michael J. Ryan (doctor) (born 1965), Irish doctor and chief executive director of the WHO Health Emergencies Programme
- Michael J. Ryan (biologist), American biologist
- J. Michael Ryan, associate judge on the Superior Court of the District of Columbia
- Michael A. Ryan, US Army general

== See also ==
- Michael J. Ryan (disambiguation)
- Michael Joseph Ryan (disambiguation)
- Michael Patrick Ryan (disambiguation)
- Mick Ryan (disambiguation)
