= Michael J. Ryan =

Michael J. Ryan may refer to:

- Michael J. Ryan (runner) (1889–1971), winner of the 1912 Boston Marathon
- Michael J. Ryan (biologist) (fl. 1980s–2020s), American biologist
- Michael J. Ryan (doctor) (born 1965), Irish epidemiologist, surgeon, and chief executive director of the WHO Health Emergencies Programme
- Michael J. Ryan (Irish politician) (died 1952), Irish barrister, professor and politician
- Michael J. Ryan (Philadelphia politician) (1862–1943), president of the United Irish League of America
- Michael James Ryan or Mike Ryan (1941–2020), American baseball player
- Michael Joseph Ryan (footballer) or Mike Ryan (1930–2006), English footballer
- Michael Joseph Ryan (media hoaxer) or Rocky Ryan (1937–2004), British media hoaxer

== See also ==
- J. Michael Ryan (born 1957), American judge
- Michael Ryan (disambiguation)
- Michael Joseph Ryan (disambiguation)
