= Michael Joseph Ryan =

Michael Joseph Ryan may refer to:

- Michael Joseph Ryan (biologist) (fl. 1980s–2020s), American biologist
- Michael Joseph Ryan (doctor) (born 1965), Irish trauma surgeon and epidemiologist
- Michael Joseph Ryan (footballer) or Mike Ryan (1930–2006), English footballer
- Michael Joseph Ryan (media hoaxer) or Rocky Ryan (1937–2004), British media hoaxer

== See also ==
- Michael Ryan (disambiguation)
- Michael J. Ryan (disambiguation)
