= 2016 Netball Superleague Grand Final =

Netball Superleague grand final

- Event: 2016 Netball Superleague season
Surrey Storm	Manchester Thunder
.	.
55	53
- Surrey Storm's third consecutive grand final. Storm win second Superleague title.
- Date: 7 May 2016
- Venue: Copper Box Arena, London
- Player of the Match: Pamela Cookey

The 2016 Netball Superleague Grand Final featured Surrey Storm and Manchester Thunder. Having previously played each other in 2012 and 2014, this was the third grand final featuring both teams. Thunder had won both the previous encounters. This was also Surrey Storm's third consecutive grand final, having lost to Thunder in 2014, they defeated Hertfordshire Mavericks in 2015.

In the 2016 grand final Surrey Storm retained the Netball Superleague title after defeating Manchester Thunder by 55–53. Storm had comfortably led Thunder throughout the first three quarters. They headed into the third quarter with a 32–19 advantage. However in the final quarter Thunder staged a comeback. Thunder's Helen Housby reduced the deficit to just one goal with seconds remaining. However Rachel Dunn secured the title for Storm with the final goal of the game.

== Match summary ==
7 May 2016	Surrey Storm	55–53	Manchester Thunder	Copper Box Arena	Sky Sports
7 May 2016	Scoring by quarter: 15–9, 32–19, 43–36, 55–53			Copper Box Arena	Sky Sports
7 May 2016	Pamela Cookey 28/31 (90%); Rachel Dunn 27/32 (84%)		Helen Housby 38/39 (97%); Kathryn Turner 8/10 (80%); Eleanor Cardwell 7/10 (70%)	Copper Box Arena	Sky Sports

== Teams ==
Head Coach: Kathryn Ratnapala Starting 7: GS Rachel Dunn; GA Pamela Cookey; WA Georgia Lees; C Sophia Candappa; WD Amy Flanagan; GD Katy Holland; GK Hannah Reid (c) Substitutes: Josie Huckle; Kathryn Ainsworth for Georgia Lees; Kat Hayes Changes: Hannah Reid to GD; Amy Flanagan to C Sophia Candappa to WA (Q3); Pamela Cookey to GA (Q4); Josie Huckle to GK; Kathryn Ainsworth to WD; Kat Hayes to GA	Head Coach: Dan Ryan Starting 7: GS Eleanor Cardwell; GA Helen Housby; WA Natalie Haythornthwaite; C Sara Bayman; WD Laura Malcolm; GD Jodie Gibson; GK Malysha Kelly Substitutes: Kathryn Turner for Cardwell (HT); Emma Dovey; Kerry Almond; Gabby Marshall for Malcolm Changes:
