= Gigg Lane =

Football stadium in Bury, Lancashire

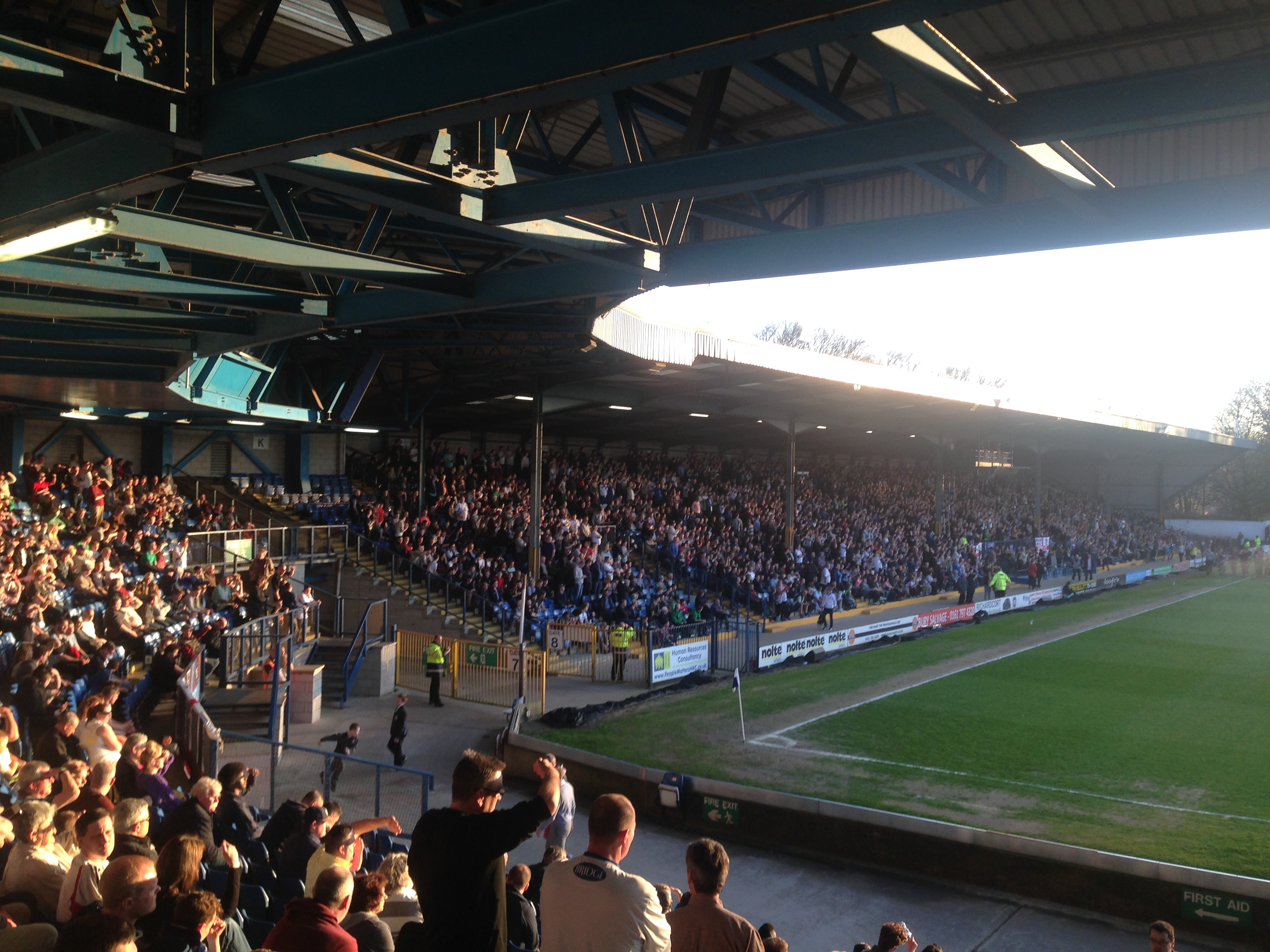

- Location of Gigg Lane Gigg Lane (England)
- Full name: Gigg Lane Stadium
- Location: Bury, England
- Coordinates: 53°34′50″N 2°17′41″W
- Owner: Gigg Lane Stadium Limited
- Operator: Bury F.C.
- Capacity: 12,500
- Record attendance: 35,000
- Field size: 112 by 73 yards (102 m × 67 m)

Construction
- Built: 1885
- Opened: 12 September 1885

Tenants
- Bury (1885–2019, 2023–); Swinton RLFC (1992–2002); F.C. United of Manchester (2005–2014)

Gigg Lane is a football ground in Bury, Greater Manchester, England, built for Bury F.C. in 1885. The first match was played on 12 September 1885 between Bury and a team from Wigan. One of the world's oldest professional football stadiums, Gigg Lane was in continuous use by Bury until August 2019 when the club was expelled from the English Football League. The ground did not host competitive men's football between 4 May 2019, when Bury hosted Port Vale, and 29 July 2023.

In November 2020, Bury F.C. was placed in administration and the ground was later put up for sale by the administrator. In February 2022, the Est.1885 fans' group completed a deal to purchase the entire property. They also acquired the trading name and memorabilia of Bury F.C. The new owners formed the company Gigg Lane Stadium Limited and stated their intention to reopen the ground as a football venue by August 2022. On 29 July 2023, the newly reformed Bury FC played its first game at Gigg Lane, beating Glossop North End 5–1 in the North West Counties Football League.

Gigg Lane has four covered stands and has been an all-seater stadium since 2000. Its capacity when last used in 2019 was 11,840. The record attendance is 35,000 for an FA Cup tie (Note: In English football, a match between two teams in a knockout tournament such as the FA Cup is known as a "tie". This has no connection with a tie (draw), which is a result with identical scores or points.) in 1960 when the stands were nearly all terraced. FC United of Manchester had a ground-sharing agreement with Bury from 2005 to 2014. Besides football, the ground has been used for other sports including rugby league – it was the home of Swinton Lions for ten years from 1992.

== History ==
=== Early history ===
Ahead of the 1885–86 English football season, the newly formed Bury F.C. leased a plot of land on Gigg Lane from the Earl of Derby's estate. On 12 September 1885, the first match played there was a friendly against Wigan A.F.C. and Bury won 4–3. Gigg Lane is one of the world's oldest professional football venues; the oldest in continuous use (excluding wartime) is Deepdale, home of Preston North End, which opened for football on 5 October 1878, seven years before Gigg Lane.

In 1889, Bury was a founder member of the Lancashire League and the ground began to be used on a regular basis. The first FA Cup tie played at Gigg Lane was a qualifying round match between Bury and Witton Albion on 3 October 1891, the home team winning 3–1. The ground staged its first match in the competition proper on 2 February 1895 when Bury defeated Leicester Fosse 4–1 in a first round tie.

In 1894, Bury joined the Football League and competed in the 1894–95 Second Division, which they won, thereby gaining promotion to the First Division. Their first Football League game at Gigg Lane was a 4–2 victory over Manchester City on 8 September 1894, before a crowd of 7,070.

=== Capacity and crowd records ===
Development of the ground over many years increased its capacity to around 32,000 before the Second World War. Anticipating a full house for the FA Cup third round tie against neighbouring Bolton Wanderers on 9 January 1960, the club installed additional crush barriers in the Manchester Road End. This raised the capacity to 35,000 and, as expected, the ground was full for the cup tie; the crowd that day remains the ground record. The tie ended 1–1 and Bury lost the replay 4–2 after extra time. Gigg Lane's record crowd for a Football League game is 34,386 at a Second Division (tier two) match against Blackpool on 1 January 1937, which Blackpool won 3–2. The highest all-seater attendance at Gigg Lane was recorded on 26 December 1999 when a crowd of 9,115 watched a Second Division (tier three) match against Burnley.

In April 2025, Bury FC pulled in 8,719 supporters at Gigg Lane for a 9th-tier North West Counties League match against Burscough. That crowd confirmed the league title and promotion. It broke all previous NWCFL attendance records by an astronomical figure.

Gigg Lane's lowest crowd for a competitive first team game is 461 at a Football League Trophy tie against Tranmere Rovers on 26 February 1986. The ground's lowest Football League crowd is 1,096 at a Fourth Division match against Northampton Town on 5 May 1984.

=== Floodlighting ===
Floodlighting was first used at Gigg Lane on 5 November 1889 when a friendly match was played using an apparatus called Wells Patent Lights. With a crowd of 7,000 in attendance, Bury lost the game 5–4 to the now defunct Heywood Central.

The first permanent lights were installed on pylons in 1953 and were officially switched on at a friendly match with Wolverhampton Wanderers on 6 October of that year. At that time, the Football League did not allow competitive matches under lights. A modern lighting system was installed as part of the ground renovation work that began in 1993.

=== Sponsorship deals ===
In November 2013, Gigg Lane was rebranded for commercial reasons as the JD Stadium after Bury announced a three-year sponsorship deal with JD Sports. The deal was terminated by mutual agreement in July 2015. In 2016, it was announced that the club was looking to build a new 15,000–20,000 capacity stadium elsewhere in the Metropolitan Borough of Bury. No progress was made and there was a change of club ownership in December 2018.

On 19 February 2019, it was announced that the ground would be rebranded as the Planet-U Energy Stadium after Bury concluded a five-year sponsorship deal with the Leeds-based renewable energy supplier of that name. It was intended that the stadium would be powered by 100 per cent renewable energy.

On 3 July 2026, the club announced a commercial partnership deal with Salford Van & Car Hire, who became the club's 'Official Stadium Naming Rights Principal Partner' ahead of the 2026–27 season.

=== Club in administration ===
Bury's final match of the 2018–19 season in EFL League Two was against Port Vale at Gigg Lane on 4 May 2019. Despite earning promotion from League Two to EFL League One, the club was heavily in debt and, on 27 August 2019, was expelled from the Football League because it could no longer guarantee its financial viability. Gigg Lane has been closed since August 2019. The club was placed in administration on 27 November 2020 and, the following May, the administrator put the ground up for sale.

In August 2021, a fans-backed group, Est.1885, was named among the bidders to buy the ground and club. Est.1885 was given exclusivity, on 22 October 2021, to buy both the trading name and Gigg Lane. On 23 December 2021, the UK Government, through the Community Ownership Fund run by the Department for Levelling Up, Housing and Communities, pledged £1m towards the bid to buy back Gigg Lane. Est.1885 announced on 7 January 2022 that contracts had been exchanged on a deal to buy the stadium, the club's name and memorabilia, with plans to resume competitive football in August 2022. Bury MBC agreed a financial contribution of up to £450,000 towards the costs of recommissioning Gigg Lane.

=== New ownership from February 2022 ===
On 18 February 2022, Est.1885 completed the purchase of Gigg Lane from the administrator and acquired the Bury Football Club trading name, history and memorabilia. On 21 February, it was confirmed that the owner of Gigg Lane (and of the Bury FC trading name) was a company called Gigg Lane Stadium Limited, who are limited by guarantee, and whose members are the Bury Football Club Supporters Society Limited and Gigg Lane Propco Limited. When a Bury FC team plays at Gigg Lane in future, it would represent Gigg Lane Stadium Limited. Meanwhile, the old club incorporated in 1885 – The Bury Football Club Company Ltd – remained in administration under the ownership of chairman Steve Dale, who bought the club in December 2018.

Bury A.F.C. enquired about renting Gigg Lane but the request was rejected on 5 April 2022 as "not feasible" by the Bury FC Supporters Society who cited commercial risks and imbalances that could jeopardise a future merger with Bury AFC.

On Sunday, 24 April, Bury FC Women returned to Gigg Lane for a friendly match against Fleetwood Town Wrens. This was the first match of any kind to be played at the ground since May 2019. Bury FC Women won 3–0 (1–0 at half-time) before a crowd of almost 500, the goalscorers being Lucy Golding, Kimberley Tyson and Sophie Coates.

=== BFCSS and Shakers merger ===
In October 2022, local football supporters were urged to vote in a poll, facilitated by the Football Supporters' Association, regarding a potential amalgamation of BFCSS (who owned Gigg Lane and the Bury FC name) and the Shakers Community Society (who owned the separate phoenix club, Bury AFC). If the merger was agreed at special meetings, a new society - The Football Supporters' Society of Bury - would be formed, based at Gigg Lane, while Bury AFC would change its playing name to Bury Football Club. However, amid continuing tensions between the two groups, the proposals failed to reach the required 66% threshold from both societies.

In January 2023, Bury AFC said it had made several proposals to BFCSS to return professional men's football to Gigg Lane, including a solution which might unlock the DLUHC Grant Funding Agreement to purchase the ground, but its proposals had been rejected. In late January 2023, it was reported that BFCSS had submitted a detailed proposal to the North West Counties Football League (NWCFL) to restart a professional football club at Gigg Lane, though some of the claims were disputed by the Shakers group. After the application was rejected by the NWCFL, the BFCSS proposed to apply to the West Lancashire League, saying it was of "paramount importance ... that men's football is played at Gigg Lane next season", while negotiating for a second vote on amalgamation with the Shakers group.

In March 2023, a second poll regarding a merger between Bury FC and Bury AFC was announced. BFCSS's Daniel Bowerbank talked about uniting the "broken fanbase", adding: "We've got a team with no stadium and then the other side with a stadium but no football team." Bury AFC's Phil Young said: "This is really the only way forward for us." The second merger vote was announced on 5 May 2023; members of both Bury FC and Bury AFC then voted to merge the two clubs. On 5 June 2023, the club said that the FA had confirmed that the name "Bury Football Club" could be used in competition for the first time since August 2019, with the club competing in the Premier Division of the North West Counties League, the ninth tier of the English football pyramid. The side won their opening league fixture of the 2023–2024 season on 29 July 2023 with a 5-1 victory over Glossop North End, played at Gigg Lane in front of almost 5,500 spectators (said to be record-breaking for the division).

== Structure and facilities ==
In 1993, the club began removal of all terracing and barriers in the ground as required by the recommendations of the Taylor Report, which was published in January 1990 following the Hillsborough disaster. The report required Football League clubs to convert their grounds into all-seater stadiums and Bury had to rebuild all four sides of Gigg Lane. The new safety regulations had imposed a ground capacity of 8,000 and the club needed to raise £300,000 in order to commence the work. This was raised by means of a supporters' bond called the Shakers' Incentive Scheme, augmented by substantial takings from an FA Cup tie against Manchester United at Old Trafford. The ground was mostly terraced before the renovation work in which four covered stands were built and the stadium became an all-seater. Gigg Lane's capacity was 11,840 in May 2019 when it was last in use.

The pitch-length Main Stand / Neville Neville Stand is on the northern side of the ground and houses the club offices and dressing rooms. The seating is raised above pitch level. This is traditionally called the Main Stand until November 2015 when Bury renamed it in honour of the club's commercial director Neville Neville, the father of Gary, Phil and Tracey Neville.

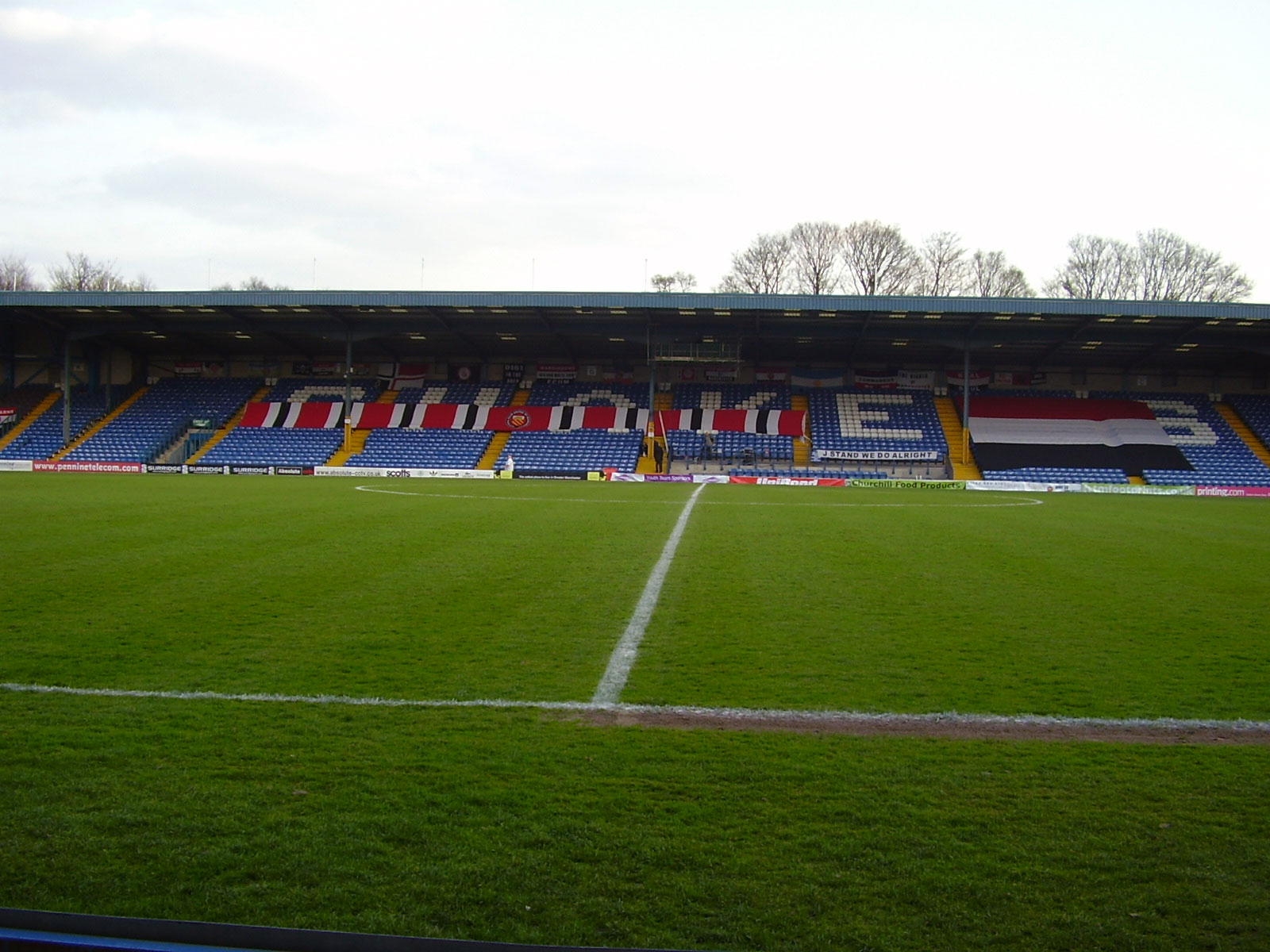
The Les Hart Stand at Gigg Lane

On the opposite side of the ground is the single-tiered South Stand / Les Hart Stand, also pitch-length, which is traditionally known as the South Stand and renamed after club stalwart Les Hart in July 2010. This is the largest of the four stands and is distinctive for its pattern of blue and white seats that spell out SHAKERS, the club's nickname. The South Stand adjoins the Cemetery End, enclosing that corner of the ground; the other three corners are open. The enclosed south-east corner, traditionally called the Boys Stand, has a police control box suspended beneath the stand roof; and an electronic screen was installed there in September 2015 to show advertisements, match highlights and scorelines. There is a TV gantry under the South Stand roof.

Neither of the two end stands run the full width of the pitch. In 1999, the Cemetery End was the last terraced section to be demolished and it was replaced by the East Stand / Cemetery End which was opened on the final day of the 1999–2000 season. The Manchester Road End stand, at the western end of the ground, was home to the club's first electronic scoreboard (obtained from Leicester City's Filbert Street after it closed in 2002) until 2010 when it broke down and was found to be unrepairable. A replacement was installed in 2011. The Manchester Road End is reserved for away supporters and can accommodate 2,100.

== Other users ==
Other football clubs have used the stadium as a temporary home venue. In August 1994, Preston North End played a home League Cup tie there against Stockport County. In December 1971, non-league Rossendale United moved a home FA Cup tie against Bolton Wanderers to Gigg Lane. Radcliffe Borough did likewise for a home tie against York City in November 2000.

FC United of Manchester shared the ground from the 2005–06 season until 2013–14. Their biggest attendance was 6,731 for the replay of a second round FA Cup tie against Brighton & Hove Albion on 8 December 2010.

The stadium has accommodated many sports besides football. From 1992 to 2002, it was a rugby league venue while Swinton Lions had a ground-sharing agreement with Bury. Other sports played there have included American football, baseball, cricket and lacrosse.

== Bibliography ==
- Collett, Mike (2003). The Complete Record of the FA Cup. Cheltenham: SportsBooks Ltd. ISBN 978-18-99807-19-2.
- Goldstein, Dan (2000). Rough Guide to English Football. London: Rough Guides Ltd. ISBN 978-18-58285-57-3.
