= Michael S. Ryan =

Michael S. Ryan may refer to:

- Michael S. Ryan (film producer) or Mike S. Ryan (fl. 2006–2007), American film producer
- Michael Sean Ryan (born 1977), American baseball player
- Michael Stuart Ryan or Mike Ryan (born 1979), English footballer

== See also ==
- Michael Ryan (disambiguation)
