= Michael Patrick Ryan (disambiguation) =

Michael Patrick Ryan (1825–1893) was an Irish-born Canadian politician and businessperson.

Michael Patrick Ryan may also refer to:

- Michael Patrick Ryan (baseball) or Mike Ryan (1868–1935), American baseball player
- Michael Patrick Ryan (marine) (1916–2005), US Marine Corps general
- Michael Patrick Ryan (soccer) or Mike Ryan (1935–2012), Irish-American soccer coach

== See also ==
- Michael Ryan (disambiguation)
