= 2014 Netball Superleague Grand Final =

Netball Superleague grand final

- Event: 2014 Netball Superleague season
Manchester Thunder	Surrey Storm
.	.
49	48
- Thunder win a second grand final. Surrey make third grand final appearance in four years.
- Date: 26 April 2014
- Venue: University of Worcester Arena, Worcester
- Player of the Match: Helen Housby (Manchester Thunder)

The 2014 Netball Superleague Grand Final featured Manchester Thunder and Surrey Storm. This was the second grand final featuring Thunder and Storm. The two teams previously met in the 2012 grand final which Thunder won by two points. After winning the regular season without losing a match, Storm, with a team featuring player/coach Tamsin Greenway and Rachel Dunn, started the final as favourites. At half-time they were leading 26–22 and after three quarters were still ahead at 38–36. However Thunder, coached by Tracey Neville and featuring Sara Bayman, remained a threat throughout the match. With the score at 48–48 and twenty-five seconds on the clock, pressure from Jodie Gibson saw Storm lose possession. Thunder pounced on a loose ball and fed it to Helen Housby who subsequently netted a very late winner.

== Match summary ==
26 April 2014; 18:00	Manchester Thunder	49–48	Surrey Storm	University of Worcester Arena	Sky Sports
26 April 2014; 18:00	Scoring by quarter: 11–10, 22–26, 36–38, 49–48			University of Worcester Arena	Sky Sports

== Teams ==
Head Coach: Tracey Neville Starting 7: GS Krista Enziano; GA Helen Housby; WA Beth Cobden; C Sara Bayman; WD Laura Malcolm; GD Emma Dovey; GK Kerry Almond Substitutes: GD Jodie Gibson for Dovey Squad: GA/GS Eleanor Cardwell ? Alice Travis ? Kathryn Turner ? Georgie Webster	Head Coach: Tamsin Greenway Squad: GS Rachel Dunn; GA Tamsin Greenway; WA Georgia Lees; C Becky Trippick; WD Amy Flanagan; GD Katy Holland; GK Hannah Reid WD/WA Kathryn Ainsworth; GA Stef Bello; WA Katie Harris ? Alex Sinclair
