= Eleanor Cardwell =

English international netball player (born 1994)

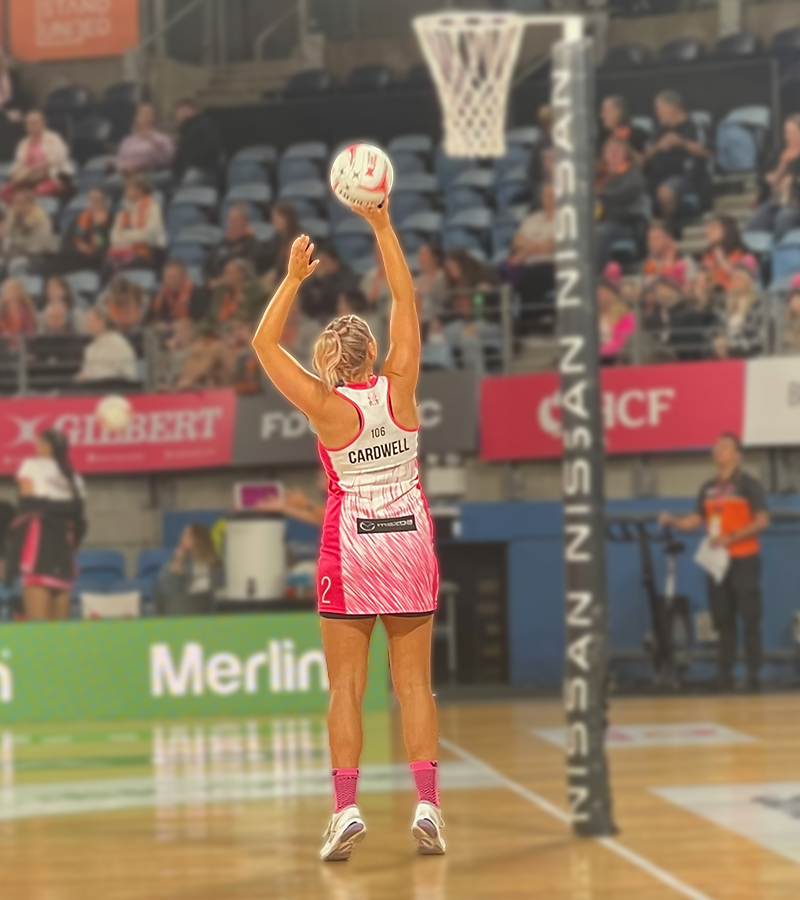
- Cardwell warming up for the Adelaide Thunderbirds in 2023

Personal information
- Born: 11 November 1994 (age 31) Blackpool, England
- Height: 186 cm (6 ft 1 in)
- University: Liverpool John Moores University

Netball career
- Playing position: GS
| Years | Club team | Apps |
| 2012–2016 | Manchester Thunder | |
| 2017–2018 | Severn Stars | |
| 2019–2022 | Manchester Thunder | |
| 2023 | Adelaide Thunderbirds | 16 |
| 2024 - 2025 | Melbourne Mavericks | 11 |
| 2026 | Manchester Thunder | |
| Years | National team | Caps |
| 2016–present | England | 71 |
Medal record
Representing England
Netball World Cup
| Silver medal – second place | 2023 Cape Town | Netball |
- Updated on May 2025

Eleanor Cardwell (born 11 November 1994) is an English international netball player. She plays for Manchester Thunder in the Netball Super League and is a member of the English national netball team.

== Early life and education ==
Cardwell was born in Blackpool and began playing netball at primary school before joining Blackpool Netball Club at the age of 10. She has a BSc in Sports and Exercise from Liverpool John Moores University where she graduated in 2016.

== Club career ==
=== Manchester Thunder ===
Cardwell started her career at Manchester Thunder initially as a defender, before Tracey Neville encouraged her to become a shooter in the 2015 Super League season. She made three grand finals with thunder in 2012, 2014 and 2016, winning the title in 2012 and 2014.

=== Severn Stars ===
Cardwell moved to new Super League franchise Severn Stars for the 2017 season where she played for two seasons.

=== Manchester Thunder ===
She returned to Manchester Thunder ahead of the 2019 Super League season. There she won a further two Super League grand finals in 2019 and 2022. At the 2022 Super League Awards, she took home the Sky Sports Fans’ Player of the Season and was named Players’ Player of the Season.

=== Adelaide Thunderbirds ===
In 2023, Cardwell made the move to Australia and joined the Adelaide Thunderbirds for the 2023 Suncorp Super Netball season. The Thunderbirds won the championship in extra time by a single goal and Cardwell was named the Grand Final MVP.

=== Melbourne Mavericks ===
For the 2024 Suncorp Super Netball Season, Cardwell joined former Manchester Thunder and England head coach Tracey Neville at new franchise Melbourne Mavericks for the teams inaugural season helping them place fifth. Cardwell was diagnosed with a meniscus tear leading to a six-month recovery but suffered a full root detachment of her lateral meniscus during a three-match series against Australia in October 2024.

=== Manchester Thunder ===
Following recovering from her injury Cardwell decided to return to Netball Super League side Manchester Thunder for the 2026 season. Cardwell won her fifth Super League title during the 2026 season when Thunder defeated London Pulse 54-51 in the Grand Final to be named champions.

== International career ==
Cardwell represented England U17s in Netball Europe and U19s for a tour of Jamaica. On 13 May 2016, she made her senior debut for England against Northern Ireland in the 2016 Netball Europe Open Championships.

Her first call-up to a senior major international competition was the 2022 Commonwealth Games, where England failed to medal. She achieved her 50th England Roses cap in October 2022 against Australia. In 2023, Cardwell was part of the England Roses team who achieved their first ever Netball World Cup Silver Medal in Cape Town. Cardwell won silver at the 2024 Netball Nations Cup. Cardwell suffered a full root detachment of her lateral meniscus during a three-match series against Australia in October 2024. She made her return to the international stage in November 2025 during a three-match series against New Zealand.

In June 2026 Cardwell was selected into the 2026 Commonwealth Games team.

== Personal life ==
Cardwell previously trained in Taekwondo three nights a week alongside her netball. She is also known for her advocacy work supporting women and girls with correct-fitting sports bras.

== Honours ==
=== England ===
- Netball World Cup: Silver: 2023
- Netball Nations Cup: Silver: 2024

=== Manchester Thunder ===
- Netball Super League: 2012, 2014, 2019, 2022, 2026 Runner up: 2016

=== Adelaide Thunderbirds ===
- Suncorp Super Netball: 2023

== Individual awards ==
=== Netball Super League ===
- Players Player of the Season: 2022
- Fans Player of the Season: 2022
- All Star VII: 2021, 2022
