= Manchester Thunder =

Netball Super League team

AO Manchester Thunder
- Nickname(s): Black and Yellows
- Founded: 2001
- Based in: Manchester
- Regions: North West England
- Home venue: Manchester Arena; Belle Vue Sports Village; Liverpool Arena
- CEO: David Jennings
- Head coach: Karen Greig
- Asst coach: Laura Malcom
- Manager: Phil Thomas
- Captain: Amy Carter
- Vice-captain: Josie Huckle, Taylor McKevitt
- Premierships: 5; 2012, 2014, 2019, 2022, 2026
- League: Netball Superleague
- Website: www.thundernetball.co.uk
Uniform
Uniform

AO Manchester Thunder are an English netball team based in Manchester. Their senior team plays in the Netball Super League where they were founding members. They were Super League champions in 2012, 2014, 2019, 2022 and 2026. Between 2001 and 2012 they played as Northern Thunder and were originally based in Bury, Greater Manchester.

== History ==
=== Northern Thunder ===
Between 2001 and 2005 Northern Thunder, together with five other franchises – Northern Flames, London Tornadoes, London Hurricanes, University of Birmingham Blaze and Team Bath Force – competed in the Super Cup. Northern Thunder won the 2002 Super Cup. Northern Thunder players from the Super Cup era included Amanda Newton, Tracey Neville, Jade Clarke and Sara Bayman.

In 2005 Northern Thunder were named as the North West England franchise in the new Netball Super League. Together with Brunel Hurricanes, Celtic Dragons, Leeds Carnegie, Galleria Mavericks, Team Bath, Loughborough Lightning and Team Northumbria, Northern Thunder were founding members of the league. In 2012, Thunder won their first Superleague title. Janelle Lawson scored 33 goals as they defeated Surrey Storm 57–55 in the grand final.

=== Manchester Thunder ===
In 2012 Thunder relocated from Bury, Greater Manchester to Gorton. They subsequently changed their name from Northern Thunder to Manchester Thunder ahead of the 2013 season. In 2014 Thunder won their second Super League title after defeating Surrey Storm 49–48 in the grand final. In 2019 Thunder won their third Super League title.

In the 2022 season Manchester Thunder finished the regular season undefeated, becoming the first team to do so over 20 games. They defeated Team Bath in the semi-finals and then beat Loughborough Lightning in the final to claim their 4th Super League title.

In the 2023 season they finished 3rd in the regular season standings and were defeated in their semi-final by the eventual champions Loughborough Lightning. They beat Surrey Storm in the third-place play-off.

In the 2024 season Manchester Thunder finished the regular season top of the table, having only lost one game - against Loughborough Lightning at home. They faced Severn Stars in the Semi Final, beating them 63-54, to set up a final against Loughborough, where they were defeated 54-70.

In 2025 season, Thunder faced many challenges with Lois Pearson, Paige Reed and new signing Nicola Smith all out with injuries and Natalie Metcalf announcing her pregnancy. Despite this the team finished 3rd in the league qualifying for playoffs where they beat London Mavericks 79-49 in the minor Semi-Final, but lost to Loughborough Lightning 69-57 in the Preliminary Final.

In August 2025 Debbie Hallas announced her decision to step down as a director and away from day-to-day involvement of Thunder. The decision came after a requirement for new investment to support the club through NSL 2.0 and ensure they were awarded the franchise. She had been at the helm for 17 years but remains a minority shareholder. David Jennings became the new owner.

In September 2025 Thunder launched a rebrand which incorporated a new logo, look and feel, as well as a new website. In February 2026, they officially changed their name to AO Manchester Thunder, as part of their sponsorship deal with online electricals retailer AO. In 2026 they claimed their fifth Super League title, defeating London Pulse in the grand final.

== Senior finals ==
=== Super Cup ===
Season	Winners	Score	Runners up	Venue
2002	Northern Thunder		University of Birmingham Blaze	
2004	Team Bath Force	49–43	Northern Thunder	Blackpool

=== Netball Super League Grand Finals ===
Season	Winners	Score	Runners up	Venue
2012	Northern Thunder	57–55	Surrey Storm	SportHouse
2014	Manchester Thunder	49–48	Surrey Storm	Worcester Arena
2016	Surrey Storm	55–53	Manchester Thunder	Copper Box Arena
2019	Manchester Thunder	57–52	Wasps	Copper Box Arena
2022	Manchester Thunder	60–53	Loughborough Lightning	Copper Box Arena
2024	Loughborough Lightning	70–54	Manchester Thunder	Resorts World Arena
2026	Manchester Thunder	54-51	London Pulse	Co-op Live

== Mike Greenwood trophy ==
Since 2012 Manchester Thunder have hosted the Manchester Invitational Tournament. The winners are awarded the Mike Greenwood Trophy, named in honour of the former Northern Thunder head coach who died in 2011. It is usually played during pre-season.

Season	Winners	Score	Runners up	Venue
2012	Manchester Thunder			
2013	Manchester Thunder			
2014	Manchester Thunder	13–12	Loughborough Lightning	Thunderdome
2015	Team Bath	19–14	Manchester Thunder	
2016	Wasps	22–15	Team Bath	Belle Vue Sports Village
2018	Manchester Thunder	31–29	benecosMavericks	Oldham Leisure Centre
2019	Manchester Thunder	49–42	Saracens Mavericks	Platt Lane Sports Complex

== Home venues ==
Thunder train and play their home games at several venues and locations throughout Greater Manchester, Lancashire and Cheshire with their main training facility and head office at MMU Platt Lane Sports Complex. Between 2008–09 and 2011, Northern Thunder played their home Super League games at Castle Leisure Centre in Bury, Greater Manchester. In 2012 Manchester Thunder began playing their home Super League games at Wright Robinson College in Gorton. When Manchester Thunder played home games there, the arena was referred to as the Manchester Thunderdome. Since 2020 Manchester Thunder have played a majority of their home Super League games at the National Basketball Performance Centre in the Belle Vue Sports Village with other home Netball Super League matches being played at Manchester Arena and in 2025 they will be playing at the M&S Bank Arena in Liverpool for the first time.

== Notable players ==
=== 2026 squad ===
2026 Manchester Thunder roster
Players
Coaching staff

Nat.	Name	Position(s)	DoB	Height
(England)	Natalie Metcalf	WA, GA	9 December 1992	1.74 m (5 ft 9 in)
(England)	Eleanor Cardwell	GS,GA	11 November 1994	1.86 m (6 ft 1 in)
(Australia)	Sophie Fawns	GA, GS	21 November 2003	1.84 m (6 ft 0 in)
(England)	Amy Carter (c)	C, WD	28 October 1998	1.75 m (5 ft 9 in)
(England)	Lois Pearson	GA, WA	20 September 1999	1.79 m (5 ft 10 in)
(South Africa)	Nicola Smith	GD, GK	25 April 2000	1.88 m (6 ft 2 in)
(England)	Taylor McKevitt (vc)	WD, C	16 December 1997	1.70 m (5 ft 7 in)
(England)	Josie Huckle (vc)	GK, GD	24 September 1991	1.88 m (6 ft 2 in)
(England)	Elia McCormick	GD, GK, WD	25 November 1999	1.84 m (6 ft 0 in)
(England)	Emma Rayner	C, WA	7 June 2002	1.69 m (5 ft 7 in)

Head coach

- Karen Greig

Assistant coach

- Laura Malcolm

Notes

- (c) – Captain
- (cc) – Co-captain
- (vc) – Vice-captain
- – Injury / maternity leave
- (TRP) – Temporary Replacement Player
Player profiles: Team website
Last updated: 2 January 2026

=== Internationals ===
England

- Imogen Allison
- Sara Bayman
- Eleanor Cardwell
- Amy Carter
- Jade Clarke
- Beth Cobden
- Jodie Gibson
- Laura Malcolm
- Gabby Marshall
- Natalie Metcalf
- Helen Housby
- Berri Neil
- Amanda Newton
- Tracey Neville
- Lois Pearson
- Chelsea Pitman
- Paige Reed
- Alicia Scholes

Australia

- Erin Bell
- Chelsea Pitman

Jamaica

- Malysha Kelly

Malawi

- Takondwa Lwazi
- Joyce Mvula
- Loreen Ngwira

New Zealand

- Liana Leota
- Te Huinga Reo Selby-Rickit
- Anna Thompson

Northern Ireland

- Caroline O'Hanlon

South Africa

- Lenize Potgieter
- Nicola Smith
- Elmerè van der Berg
- Shadine van der Merwe

Wales

- Sara Hale

== Head coaches ==
Coach	Years
(England) Mike Greenwood	2008–2011
(England) Tracey Neville	2011–2015
(Australia) Dan Ryan	2015–2016
(England) Karen Greig	2016–present

== Honours ==
- Netball Super League
  - Winners: 2012, 2014, 2019, 2022, 2026: 5
  - Runners up: 2016, 2024: 2
- Super Cup
  - Winners: 2002: 1
  - Runners up: 2004: 1
- Mike Greenwood Trophy
  - Winners: 2012, 2013, 2014, 2018, 2019: 5
  - Runners up: 2015: 1
