= Mick Ryan =

Mick Ryan may refer to:

- Mick Ryan (Australian footballer) (1882–1957), Australian rules footballer for Collingwood
- Mick Ryan (Gaelic footballer) (born 1946), Irish retired Gaelic footballer
- Mick Ryan (golfer) (1897–1965), Australian amateur golfer
- Mick Ryan (hurler, born 1925) (1925–2007), Irish hurler
- Mick Ryan (Borris–Ileigh hurler) (born 1960), Irish hurler
- Mick Ryan (politician) (1884–1970), Australian politician
- Mick Ryan (racehorse trainer) (1941–2022), British racehorse trainer
- Mick Ryan (rower) (born 1947), Irish Olympic rower
- Mick Ryan (rugby league) (born 1953), Australian rugby league footballer
- Mick Ryan (rugby union), Irish international rugby union player
- Mick Ryan (general), commander, Australian Defence College 2018

== See also ==
- Michael Ryan (disambiguation)
