= Neville Neville =

English football director (1949–2015)

- Born: 26 September 1949; Burnley, England
- Died: 7 August 2015 (aged 65); Sydney, Australia
- Occupations: Football agent, director
- Spouse: Jill Harper
- Children: Gary; Tracey; Phil

Neville Neville (26 September 1949 – 7 August 2015) was a football agent and director. His sons are the former professional association football players Gary Neville and Phil Neville and his daughter is the professional netball player and coach Tracey Neville.

== Cricket career ==
Neville played cricket for Greenmount Cricket Club in the Bolton Cricket League during the 1980s. His daughter Tracey cites this as her earliest sporting memory.

== Family ==
Neville and his wife, Jill, the one-time general manager and Club Secretary of English Football League club Bury, had three children: Gary and twins Tracey and Phil.

Neville was the agent for his two sons. The elder Neville represented the two younger Nevilles during contract talks with their respective clubs.

When his eldest son Gary decided to postpone any testimonial match until his playing career was over, Neville stated that "In this day and age when players earn such fantastic amounts of money we think it would be better to create some kind of facility for the supporters."

== Football and charity work ==
Neville was a director of club Bury of the English Football League. He was the spearhead and vice-chairman of the "Save our Shakers" appeal which was a bid to give financial assistance to the struggling football club after it had gone into administration.

The campaign was "brilliantly orchestrated" by Neville and he was praised for tirelessly organising supporters groups, giving media interviews and working closely with the administrators to arrange a deal to secure the club's safety. In November 2015, the main stand at Gigg Lane was posthumously named after him as a tribute to his contributions as club director.

== Name ==
Neville achieved something of a cult status among football fans because of his unusual name. His name is part of what has been called "one of the best chants in football":

Neville Neville, they're in defence
Neville Neville, their future's immense
Neville Neville, they ain't half bad
Neville Neville, the name of their dad

Neville Neville your future's immense
Neville Neville you play in defence
Neville Neville you ain't half bad
Neville Neville is the name of your dad

(Sung to the tune of David Bowie's "Rebel Rebel")

== Arrest ==
On 26 March 2013, Neville was arrested by Greater Manchester Police on suspicion of indecent assault. He was released on bail until May of that year, pending further inquiries. He was found not guilty on 19 December 2013.

== Death ==
Neville died on 7 August 2015 in Sydney at the age of 65, following a heart attack. He took ill while in Australia to support his daughter Tracey, England's netball coach, during the World Cup. Manchester United players wore black armbands during their game against Tottenham Hotspur on 8 August 2015 while the England netball team observed a minute's silence prior to their Third Place match, which they won. Neville's funeral took place on 27 August 2015 in Bury.
