= Lois Pearson =

English netball player

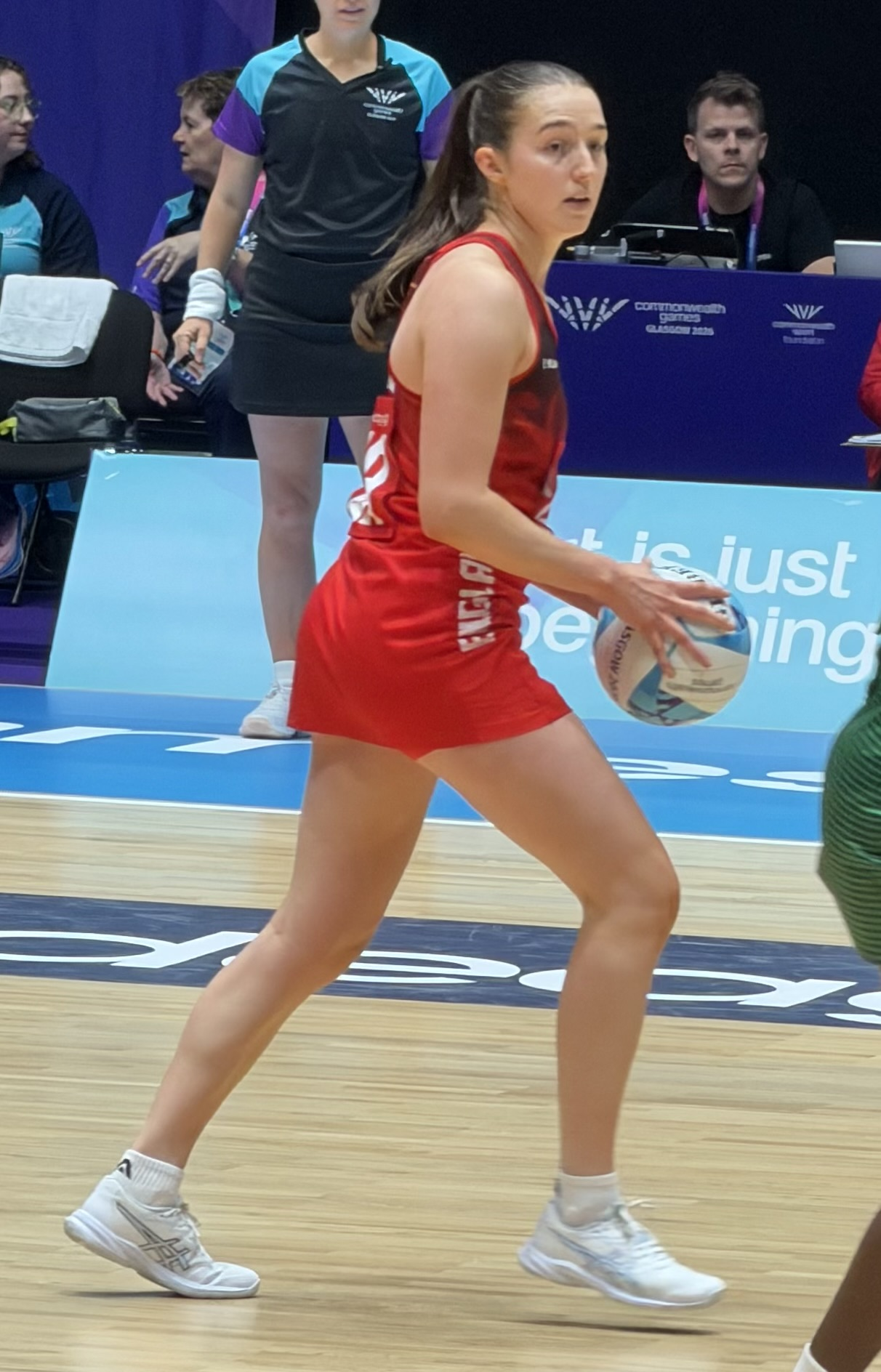
- Pearson at the 2026 Commonwealth Games

Personal information
- Full name: Lois Pearson
- Born: 20 September 1999 (age 26) Greater Manchester
- Height: 176 cm (5 ft 9 1/2 in)
- School: Woodhey High School
- University: University of Manchester

Netball career
- Playing positions: GA, WA
Years	Club team	Apps
2021-present	Manchester Thunder	
Years	National team	Caps
2022-2023	England Future Roses	
2024-present	England	10
- Updated on November 2025

Lois Pearson (born 20 September 1999) is an English international netball player. She plays for Manchester Thunder in the Netball Super League and is a member of the England national netball team.

== Early life and education ==
Born and raised in Manchester, Pearson attended Woodhey High School and played netball for her local club YWCA Bury. She graduated from the University of Manchester with a degree in mathematics and a Masters in Economics.

== Club career ==
=== Manchester Thunder ===
Pearson was a member of the Manchester Thunder pathway since 2012. She stepped up from a training partner to the first team squad in 2021 and made 21 appearances, earning Thunder's Most Improved Player award at the end of their title-winning season.

Pearson re-signed for Thunder ahead of the 2023 season and became a consistent presence in the matchday squad. The 2024 season saw her establish herself as a lynchpin in the northern side's attacking line-up, helping the team make the grand final but ultimately losing to Loughborough Lightning. Her individual performance saw her named the 2024 Players’ Player of the Season and she was included in the All Star VII. Person also hit the milestone of 50 NSL appearances in the 2024 season.

Pearson suffered a hamstring injury that required surgery in January 2025. She made her return from injury at the England Australia test series in November 2025. In 2026 Pearson won her second title when Thunder defeated London Pulse 54-51 in the Grand Final to be named champions.

== International career ==
Pearson spent number of years in the Roses pathway and represented England at the 2022 Fast5 World Netball Series.

She was then included in the Future Roses Programme for two years before being elevated to the Vitality Roses Programme for 2024–25. Pearson's first senior call-up for the Vitality Roses came in August 2024 ahead of Australia Test Series and 2024 Taini Jamison Trophy where England won.

She was named in the squad for the 2025 Horizon test series vs Jamaica and later the 2025 Netball Nations Cup where she had to withdraw due to injury. Pearson made her return from injury at the England New Zealand test series in November 2025.

In June 2026 Pearson was selected into the 2026 Commonwealth Games team.

Tournaments	Place
2022 Fast5 Netball World Series	4th
2024 Taini Jamison Trophy Series	1st

== Honours ==
=== England ===
- Taini Jamison Trophy: 2024

=== Manchester Thunder ===
- Netball Super League: 2022, 2026 Runners up: 2024

== Individual awards ==
=== Netball Super League ===
- Players Player of the Season: 2024
- All Star VII: 2024
