= Janelle Lawson =

Australian netball player

Personal information
- Born: 9 August 1987 (age 39) Perth, Western Australia
- Height: 1.92 m (6 ft 4 in)
- University: Australian Institute of Sport

Netball career
- Playing positions: GA, GS
Years	Club team	Apps
2005	Perth Orioles	
2006–2007	AIS Canberra Darters	
2008–2009	Queensland Firebirds	
2009–2010	West Coast Fever	
2012	Northern Thunder	
2013	→ Manchester Thunder	
2015	Monash University Storm	
2016–201x	ACU Sovereigns	
2018–	Southern Mallee Giants	

Janelle Lawson (born 9 August 1987) is a former Australian netball player. In 2012 she was a member of the Northern Thunder team that won the Netball Superleague title. During the Commonwealth Bank Trophy era she played for Perth Orioles and AIS Canberra Darters. During the ANZ Championship era she played for Queensland Firebirds and West Coast Fever.

== Playing career ==
=== Commonwealth Bank Trophy ===
In 2005 Lawson played for her home town team, Perth Orioles, in the Commonwealth Bank Trophy. Between 2006 and 2007 she played for AIS Canberra Darters.

=== ANZ Championship ===
In 2008 and 2009, Lawson played for Queensland Firebirds in the ANZ Championship. During 2010 she played for West Coast Fever.

=== Netball Superleague ===
In 2012 Lawson was a member of the Northern Thunder team that won the Netball Superleague title. In the grand final she scored 33 goals as they defeated Surrey Storm by 57–55. She also played for Thunder, now Manchester Thunder during the 2013 season, helping them reach the semi-final stage.

=== Victoria ===
Since 2015 Lawson has played in state and local leagues in Victoria, Australia. In 2015 she played for Monash University Storm and in 2016 she played for ACU Sovereigns. Both teams played in the Victorian Netball League. In 2018 she played for Southern Mallee Giants of the Wimmera Netball Association.

=== National team ===
Lawson represented Australia at under-17 and under-21 levels.

== Honours ==
Northern Thunder

- Netball Superleague
  - Winners: 2012
