= Jodie Gibson =

English netball player (born 1992)

Personal information
- Born: 30 October 1992 (age 33) Bury, England
- Height: 178 cm (5 ft 10 in)
- University: University of Worcester

Netball career
- Playing positions: GD, WD, GK
Years	Club team	Apps
2011-2016	Manchester Thunder	
2017-2019	Severn Stars	
2020-2024	Saracens Mavericks	
2025	Loughborough Lightning	
Years	National team	Caps
2017–	England	25+
2012	Great Britain	
Medal record
Representing England
Commonwealth Games
Gold medal – first place	2018 Gold Coast	Team
Representing Great Britain
World University Netball Championship
Gold medal – first place	2012 Cape Town	Team

Jodie Gibson (born 30 October 1992) is a retired English international netball player. She was part of the England squad that won gold at the 2018 Commonwealth Games. At a club level, she won two Netball Super League titles with Manchester Thunder and has also played for Saracens Mavericks, Severn Stars, and Loughborough Lightning.

== Early life and education ==
Gibson grew up in Bury, Greater Manchester and attended Unsworth Academy.

== Club career ==
=== Manchester Thunder ===
Gibson began her career in 2011 with Manchester Thunder and went on to win the 2012 Netball Super League Grand Final the following season. Gibson won a second title at the 2014 Netball Superleague Grand Final against Surrey Storm. With the score at 48–48 and twenty five seconds on the clock, pressure from Gibson saw Storm lose possession and Helen Housby netted a very late winner. Gibson made her third grand final in 2016 but lost to Surrey Storm 53-55.

=== Severn Stars ===
She joined Severn Stars for their inaugural season in 2017. She combined this with her studies for a BSc Sports degree at the University of Worcester.

=== Saracens Mavericks ===
She joined Saracens Mavericks ahead of the 2020 season, however due to injury she wasn't able to get out on court during the short-lived 2020 season. She was promoted to vice-captain for the 2023 season.

=== Loughborough Lightning ===
Gibson joined Loughborough Lightning ahead of the 2025 season. She made the 2025 Super League grand final but Lightning lost 45-53 to London Pulse to finish runners up. Gibson announced she would retire at the end of the 2025 season.

== International career ==
Gibson made her senior debut for the England Roses against Jamaica in 2013. After strong performances in Netball Europe and the Malawi Series, where she played every quarter, she was selected for the 2018 Commonwealth Games on the Gold Coast. Gibson ended her first major international competition with England's first gold at the Commonwealth Games when they beat hosts Australia in a close-fought final.

== Honours ==
=== England ===
- Commonwealth Games: 2018
- Taini Jamison Trophy: Runners up: 2017

=== Manchester Thunder ===
- Netball Super League: 2012, 2014 Runners up: 2016

=== Loughborough Lightning ===
- Netball Super League: Runners up: 2025
