= 2012 Netball Superleague season =

Netball Superleague season

- League: Netball Superleague
- Teams: 8
- TV partner: Sky Sports
- Champions: Northern Thunder
- Runners-up: Surrey Storm

Seasons
- ← 2011 2013 →

The 2012 Netball Superleague season (known for sponsorship reasons as the FIAT Netball Superleague) was the seventh season of the Netball Superleague. The league was won by Northern Thunder. In the grand final Northern Thunder defeated Surrey Storm. 2012 saw the introduction of a new format, featuring three distinct phases, including a Showdown Weekend.

== Teams ==
Following the conclusion of the 2011 Netball Superleague season, England Netball decided to cut the number of teams from nine to eight and, as a result, Glasgow Wildcats lost their place in the league. In addition, Leeds Carnegie were re-branded as Yorkshire Jets.

2012 Superleague teams	Home venue/base	Country/Region
Celtic Dragons	Sport Wales National Centre	Wales
Hertfordshire Mavericks	University of Hertfordshire	East of England
Loughborough Lightning	Loughborough University	East Midlands
Northern Thunder	Wright Robinson College	North West England
Team Bath	University of Bath	South West England/West of England
Team Northumbria	West Gate Centre for Sport, Newcastle	North East England
Surrey Storm	University of Surrey	Greater London/South East England
Yorkshire Jets	Hull / Leeds / Sheffield	Yorkshire

== Regular season ==
=== Phase 1 ===
Phase 1 featured all eight teams playing a single round of matches in a league format. At the end of the seven rounds, the top four and bottom four split into two tiers. Northern Thunder were unbeaten in Phase 1 of the season.

2012 Netball Superleague season – Phase 1
Pos	Team	Pld	W	L	D	GF	GA	PP	Pts	Qualification
1	Northern Thunder	7	7	0	0	443	269	164.7	21	Qualified for Phase 2 Tier 1
2	Surrey Storm	7	6	1	0	441	336	131.3	18	Qualified for Phase 2 Tier 1
3	Hertfordshire Mavericks	7	4	3	0	336	342	98.2	12	Qualified for Phase 2 Tier 1
4	Team Bath	7	3	4	0	356	353	100.8	9	Qualified for Phase 2 Tier 1
5	Celtic Dragons	7	3	4	0	351	355	98.9	9	Qualified for Phase 2 Tier 2
6	Yorkshire Jets	7	3	4	0	306	336	91.1	9	Qualified for Phase 2 Tier 2
7	Team Northumbria	7	1	6	0	337	387	87.1	3	Qualified for Phase 2 Tier 2
8	Loughborough Lightning	7	1	6	0	257	398	64.6	3	Qualified for Phase 2 Tier 2

=== Phase 2 ===
Phase 2 was effectively a group stage, with the teams in each group playing each other home and away.

2012 Netball Superleague season – Tier 1
Pos	Team	Pld	W	L	D	GF	GA	PP	Pts	Qualification
1	Surrey Storm	6	6	0	0	376	302	124.5	18	Qualified for semi-finals
2	Northern Thunder	6	4	2	0	376	278	135.3	12	Qualified for semi-finals
3	Hertfordshire Mavericks	6	2	4	0	266	342	77.8	6	Qualified for semi-finals
4	Team Bath	6	0	6	0	269	365	73.7	0	Qualified for Eliminator

2012 Netball Superleague season – Tier 2
Pos	Team	Pld	W	L	D	GF	GA	PP	Pts	Qualification
5	Celtic Dragons	6	6	0	0	342	249	137.3	18	Qualified for Eliminator
6	Yorkshire Jets	6	4	2	0	319	270	118.1	12	
7	Team Northumbria	6	1	5	0	273	336	81.3	3	
8	Loughborough Lightning	6	1	5	0	239	318	75.2	3	

==== Eliminator ====
The Eliminator was effectively a 4th/5th place play-off with the winner qualifying for the semi-finals.

14 May 2012	Team Bath	52–50	Celtic Dragons	University of Bath
14 May 2012	Scoring by quarter: 16–9, 28–19, 44–29, 52–50			University of Bath

== Showdown Weekend ==
Semi-final 1

19 May 2012	Northern Thunder	57–33	Hertfordshire Mavericks	SportHouse, Dagenham

Semi-final 2

19 May 2012	Surrey Storm	62–38	Team Bath	SportHouse, Dagenham

3rd/4th Place Play Off

20 May 2012	Hertfordshire Mavericks	46–39	Team Bath	SportHouse, Dagenham

Grand Final

20 May 2012	Northern Thunder	57–55	Surrey Storm	SportHouse, Dagenham; Umpires: Gary Burgess and Louise Travis
20 May 2012	Scoring by quarter: 13–14, 28–25, 42–40, 57–55			SportHouse, Dagenham; Umpires: Gary Burgess and Louise Travis
20 May 2012	Janelle Lawson 33/39 (85%); Karen Greig 24/28 (86%)		Rachel Dunn 35/41 (85%); Pamela Cookey 20/23 (87%)	SportHouse, Dagenham; Umpires: Gary Burgess and Louise Travis
