= Tracey Neville =

English netball player and coach

Tracey Neville MBE
Personal information
- Full name: Tracey Anne Neville
- Born: 21 January 1977 (age 49) Bury, Greater Manchester, England
- Occupation: Managing Director of Stockport County Ladies F.C.
- Height: 5 ft 8 in (1.73 m)
- Relatives: Neville Neville (father); Gary Neville (brother); Phil Neville (brother)
- School: Elton High School
- University: University of the West of England; University of Chester

Netball career
- Playing positions: WA, GA
Years	Club team	Apps
199x–199x	YWCA Bury	
2000	Contax	
2000	→ Adelaide Thunderbirds	
2001–2004	Northern Thunder	
2007–2008	Leeds Carnegie	
Years	National team	Caps
1996–2008	England	81
Coaching career
- Years: Team
- 2011: Team Northumbria
- 2011–2013: Northern Thunder
- 2013–2015: → Manchester Thunder
- 2015–2019: England
- 2023–2025: Melbourne Mavericks
Medal record
Representing England
Commonwealth Games
Bronze medal – third place	1998 Kuala Lumpur	Team
World Netball Championships
Bronze medal – third place	1999 Christchurch	Team

Tracey Anne Neville MBE (born 21 January 1977) is a former England netball international and a former England head coach. As a player, she was a member of the England teams that won bronze medals at the 1998 Commonwealth Games and the 1999 World Netball Championships. As a head coach she guided Northern Thunder/Manchester Thunder to Netball Superleague titles in 2012 and 2014. Between 2015 and 2019 she served as England head coach. She subsequently guided England to the gold medal at the 2018 Commonwealth Games and to bronze medals at the 2015 and 2019 Netball World Cups. In 2016 she was awarded an MBE. She is currently the Managing Director of Stockport County Ladies F.C..

== Early life, education and family ==
Tracey Neville is originally from Bury, Greater Manchester. She is the daughter of Neville Neville and his wife, Jill Harper. Both of her parents worked in administration roles at Bury F.C. Her father was a commercial director while her mother served as club secretary. She is the twin sister and younger sister, respectively, of Phil and Gary Neville, the former England and Manchester United footballers.

Neville attended Elton High School. She also attended the University of the West of England where she trained to be a primary school teacher. Between 2004 and 2007 she attended the University of Chester and gained a degree in Nutrition and Sports Science.

On 3 March 2020 Neville gave birth to a son, her first child with her partner Michael Timmins.

== Playing career ==
=== YWCA Bury ===
Neville began her senior netball playing career with YWCA Bury. Neville was just one of several England netball internationals to get their start at the club based in Bury, Greater Manchester. Others included Karen Atkinson, Natalie Haythornthwaite and Jodie Gibson.

=== Australia ===
Neville spent the 2000 season in Australia where she played for Contax in the South Australia Farmers Union League and for Adelaide Thunderbirds in the Commonwealth Bank Trophy league. Together with Laura and Natalie von Bertouch, Neville was a member of the Contax team that won the Farmers Union League title.

=== Northern Thunder ===
Between 2001 and 2004 Neville played for Northern Thunder in the Super Cup. Other Northern Thunder players from the Super Cup era included Amanda Newton, Jade Clarke and Sara Bayman.

=== Leeds Carnegie ===
In 2004 a serious knee problem forced Neville to quit netball. However after intensive rehabilitation she subsequently made a comeback and played for Leeds Carnegie during the 2007–08 Netball Superleague season. At the same time, she also worked for Leeds Metropolitan University's sports department.

=== England ===
Neville represented England at under-18 and under-21 levels before making her senior debut in 1996. She was subsequently a member of the England teams that won bronze medals at the 1998 Commonwealth Games and the 1999 World Netball Championships. Neville made 81 senior appearances for England.

Tournaments	Place
1998 Commonwealth Games	3rd place, bronze medalist(s)
1999 World Netball Championships	3rd place, bronze medalist(s)
2002 Commonwealth Games	4th
2003 World Netball Championships	4th

== Coaching career ==
=== Team Northumbria ===
Neville began her senior coaching career with Team Northumbria when she served as head coach for the 2011 Netball Superleague season.

=== Manchester Thunder ===
Between 2011 and 2015 Neville served as director of netball/head coach at Northern Thunder/Manchester Thunder. She guided Thunder to Netball Superleague titles in 2012 and 2014.

=== England ===
Between 2015 and 2019 Neville served as head coach of England. She was initially appointed in March 2015 as an interim coach. However after guiding England to the bronze medal at the 2015 Netball World Cup, the appointment was made permanent in September 2015. On the eve of the World Cup tournament, Neville's father, Neville Neville, died in a Sydney hospital. He and her brothers, Phil and Gary were all in Australia to support their daughter and sister. In 2016 Neville was awarded an MBE.

Neville guided England to the 2015, 2016 and 2017 Netball Europe Open Championships. She was also head coach when England won the gold medal at the 2018 Commonwealth Games. Neville later revealed that she suffered a miscarriage a day after leading England to netball Commonwealth gold.

In 2019 Neville and her twin brother, Phil, both coached England women's national teams to the semi-final stages in the 2019 Netball World Cup and 2019 FIFA Women's World Cup respectively. Phil coached the England women's national football team. After coaching England to a bronze medal at the 2019 Netball World Cup, Neville retired as head coach to start a family.

Tournaments	Place
2015 Netball Europe Open Championships	1st
2015 Netball World Cup	3rd place, bronze medalist(s)
2016 Netball Europe Open Championships	1st place, gold medalist(s)
2016 Netball Quad Series	3rd
2016 Fast5 Netball World Series	4th
2017 Netball Quad Series (January/February)	3rd
2017 Netball Quad Series (August/September)	3rd
2017 Taini Jamison Trophy Series	2nd
2017 Netball Europe Open Championships	1st place, gold medalist(s)
2017 Fast5 Netball World Series	1st place, gold medalist(s)
2018 Netball Quad Series (January)	2nd
2018 Commonwealth Games	1st place, gold medalist(s)
2018 Netball Quad Series (September)	2nd
2019 Netball Quad Series	2nd
2019 Netball World Cup	3rd place, bronze medalist(s)

=== Melbourne Mavericks ===
On 2 August 2023, she was announced as the inaugural head coach of the Melbourne Mavericks. In their debut season, Neville guided Mavericks to a fifth place finish, just missing out on the finals on goal average. This was despite Lauren Moore and Sasha Glasgow suffering season ending injuries before round one.

== Honours ==
=== Player ===
Northern Thunder

- Super Cup
  - Winners: 2002: 1

Contax

- South Australia Farmers Union League
  - Winners: 2000

=== Coach ===
England

- Commonwealth Games
  - Winners: 2018: 1
- Fast5 Netball World Series
  - Winners: 2017
- Netball Europe Open Championships
  - Winners: 2015, 2016, 2017 3
- Netball Quad Series
  - Runners Up: 2018 (Jan), 2018 (Sep), 2019 3

Northern Thunder/Manchester Thunder

- Netball Superleague
  - Winners: 2012, 2014: 2
- Mike Greenwood Trophy
  - Winners: 2012, 2013, 2014
