= Mike Ryan (footballer, born 1979) =

English footballer

Personal information
- Full name: Michael Stuart Ryan
- Date of birth: 3 October 1979 (age 47)
- Place of birth: Stockport, Greater Manchester, England
- Height: 5 ft 9 in (1.75 m)
- Position: Defender

Youth career
- 1995–1998: Manchester United

Senior career*
Years	Team	Apps	(Gls)
1998–1999	Manchester United	0	(0)
1999–2000	Wrexham	7	(0)
- Woodley Sports
- * Club domestic league appearances and goals

Michael Stuart Ryan (born 3 October 1979) is an English former professional footballer who played as a defender in the Football League for Wrexham, in non-League football for Woodley Sports, and was on the books of Manchester United without making a league appearance.

Ryan began his career with Manchester United as a forward. He made his first appearance for the club's youth team on 27 May 1995, coming on as a substitute for Terry Cooke in a 10–0 friendly win over FC Meilen, in which he played alongside future Manchester United first team players David Beckham and Phil Neville. The following season, he made seven appearances for the club's Junior B team, and on 4 April 1996, he scored his first goal for the club in a 3–1 away win over Everton B. On 8 July 1996, he signed his first trainee contract with Manchester United, and became a regular in the B side for the 1996–97 season. He made a total of 21 appearances during the season, culminating with being named on the bench for the 1997 Lancashire Youth Cup final against Blackburn Rovers.

After a lengthy conversion process over the previous two seasons, Ryan was considered a defender by the start of the 1997–98 season. He divided his time between the Junior A and B teams that season, as well as making his first appearance for the reserve team. Despite now playing in defence, he scored the most goals of his career in 1997–98, hitting the net twice for the Junior B side in the league and once in the Lancashire Youth Cup semi-final defeat to Tranmere Rovers. At the end of the season, he was rewarded with a professional contract. The 1998–99 season saw the Junior A and B teams replaced by a single Under-19 age group side, for whom Ryan scored twice in 11 appearances; he also played twice for the reserve team. However, with no first-team prospects on the horizon, he was granted a free transfer to Wrexham on 24 March 1999.

He made seven appearances for Wrexham in August and September 1999, but he failed to hold onto a place in the team and he was released at the end of the 1999–2000 season.
