= 2014 Netball Superleague season =

Netball Superleague season

- League: Netball Superleague
- Teams: 8
- TV partner: Sky Sports

2014 Netball Superleague season
- Champions: Manchester Thunder
- Runners-up: Surrey Storm
- Season MVP: Layla Guscoth (Hertfordshire Mavericks)

Seasons
- ← 2013 2015 →

The 2014 Netball Superleague season (known for sponsorship reasons as the Zeo Netball Superleague) was the ninth season of the Netball Superleague. The league was won by Manchester Thunder. Surrey Storm finished top of the table following the regular season and remained unbeaten throughout the season until they were defeated in the grand final by Manchester Thunder. This season the league was sponsored by Zeo, a soft drinks firm.

== Teams ==
| 2014 Superleague teams | Home venue/base | Country/Region |
|---|---|---|
| Celtic Dragons | Sport Wales National Centre | Wales |
| Hertfordshire Mavericks | University of Hertfordshire | East of England |
| Loughborough Lightning | Loughborough University | East Midlands |
| Manchester Thunder | Wright Robinson College | North West England |
| Team Bath | University of Bath | South West England/West of England |
| Team Northumbria | Sport Central | North East England |
| Surrey Storm | University of Surrey | Greater London/South East England |
| Yorkshire Jets | Hull / Leeds / Sheffield | Yorkshire |

== Regular season ==
Surrey Storm finished top of the table following the regular season with a record of twelve wins and two draws.

Final table

| Pos | Team | Pld | W | D | L | GF | GA | GD | Pts | Qualification |
|---|---|---|---|---|---|---|---|---|---|---|
| 1 | Surrey Storm | 14 | 12 | 2 | 0 | 829 | 655 | +174 | 38 | Qualified for the play offs |
| 2 | Manchester Thunder | 14 | 11 | 1 | 2 | 782 | 633 | +149 | 34 | Qualified for the play offs |
| 3 | Team Bath | 14 | 8 | 3 | 3 | 772 | 701 | +71 | 27 | Qualified for the play offs |
| 4 | Hertfordshire Mavericks | 14 | 7 | 1 | 6 | 699 | 629 | +70 | 22 | Qualified for the play offs |
| 5 | Celtic Dragons | 14 | 6 | 1 | 7 | 815 | 778 | +37 | 19 | |
| 6 | Team Northumbria | 14 | 4 | 1 | 9 | 666 | 800 | −134 | 13 | |
| 7 | Yorkshire Jets | 14 | 3 | 1 | 10 | 694 | 771 | −77 | 10 | |
| 8 | Loughborough Lightning | 14 | 0 | 0 | 14 | 556 | 846 | −290 | 0 | |

== Playoffs ==
=== Semi-finals ===
| 21 April 2014; 18:00 | Manchester Thunder | 43–37 | Team Bath | Wright Robinson College | Sky Sports |
| 21 April 2014; 18:00 | Scoring by quarter: 11–14, 21–24, 30–32, 43–37 | | | Wright Robinson College | Sky Sports |

| 21 April 2014; 20:00 | Surrey Storm | 52–42 | Hertfordshire Mavericks | Surrey Sports Park | Sky Sports |
| 21 April 2014; 20:00 | Scoring by quarter: 12–15, 21–26, 36–35, 52–42 | | | Surrey Sports Park | Sky Sports |

=== 3rd/4th place playoff ===
| 26 April 2014; 15:30 | Hertfordshire Mavericks | 42–34 | Team Bath | University of Worcester Arena |

== Grand Final ==
| 26 April 2014; 18:00 | Manchester Thunder | 49–48 | Surrey Storm | University of Worcester Arena; Umpires: Gary Burgess and Tracy Smith | Sky Sports |
| 26 April 2014; 18:00 | Scoring by quarter: 11–10, 22–26, 36–38, 49–48 | | | University of Worcester Arena; Umpires: Gary Burgess and Tracy Smith | Sky Sports |
