= 2012 Netball Superleague Grand Final =

Netball Superleague grand final

- Event: 2012 Netball Superleague season
Northern Thunder	Surrey Storm
	.
57	55
- Thunder win their first title on their grand final debut. Surrey Storm make their second successive grand final appearance.
- Date: 20 May 2012
- Venue: SportHouse, Dagenham
- Player of the Match: Eleanor Cardwell (Manchester Thunder)

The 2012 Netball Superleague Grand Final featured Northern Thunder and Surrey Storm. It was the first grand final not to feature either Team Bath or Mavericks. Northern Thunder won their first Superleague title.

== Match summary ==
20 May 2012	Northern Thunder	57–55	Surrey Storm	SportHouse, Dagenham; Umpires: Gary Burgess and Louise Travis
20 May 2012	Scoring by quarter: 13–14, 28–25, 42–40, 57–55			SportHouse, Dagenham; Umpires: Gary Burgess and Louise Travis
20 May 2012	Janelle Lawson 33/39 (85%); Karen Greig 24/28 (86%)		Rachel Dunn 35/41 (85%); Pamela Cookey 20/23 (87%)	SportHouse, Dagenham; Umpires: Gary Burgess and Louise Travis

== Teams ==
Head Coach: Tracey Neville Squad: GS Karen Grieg; GA Janelle Lawson; WA Beth Cobden; C Sara Bayman (c); WD Laura Malcolm; GD Emma Dovey; GK Kerry Almond GK Eleanor Cardwell; GA Kathryn Turner; GS Krista Enziano; WA Rachel Henry	Head Coach: Tamsin Greenway Squad: GS Rachel Dunn; GA Pamela Cookey; WA Tamsin Greenway; C Becky Trippick (c); WD Natalie Seaton; GD Katy Holland; GK Hannah Reid C/WD/WA Adele Modeste ? Rhianne McHale; WD/WA/C Kathryn Ainsworth ? Lorraine Betsy; GA Steff Bello
