= Mike Ryan (third baseman) =

American baseball player (1868–1935)

- Third Baseman
- Born: June 7, 1868; St. Louis, Missouri
- Died: September 13, 1935 (aged 67); Natchez, Mississippi
- Batted: Unknown Threw: Unknown

MLB debut
- July 25, 1895, for the St. Louis Browns

Last MLB appearance
- July 27, 1895, for the St. Louis Browns

MLB statistics
- Batting average: .000
- Home runs: 0
- Runs batted in: 0
- Stats at Baseball Reference

Teams
- St. Louis Browns (1895)

Michael Patrick Ryan (June 7, 1868 – September 13, 1935) was an American professional baseball third baseman for the St. Louis Browns of the National League in 1895.
