= Phil Neville =

English football player and manager

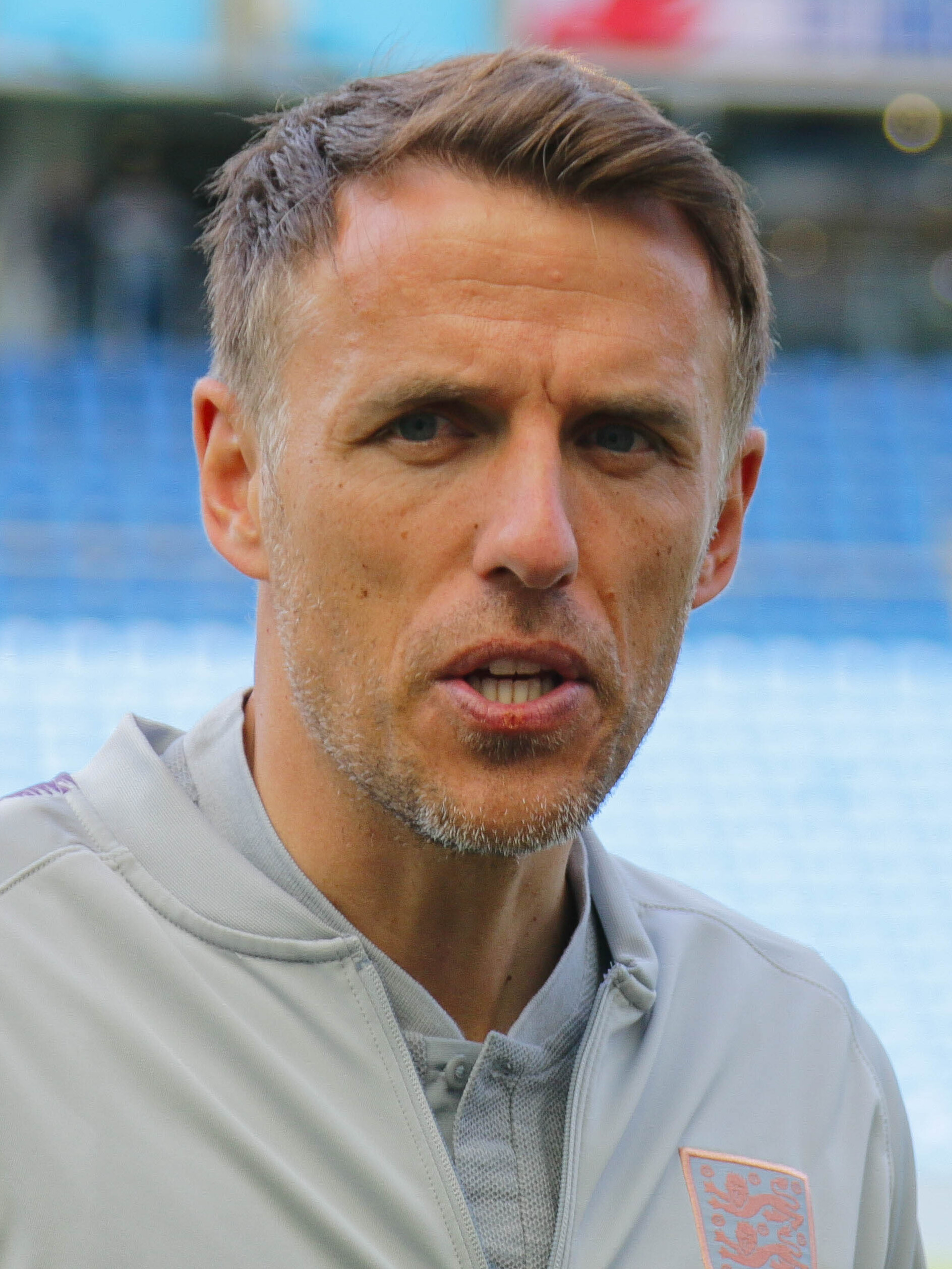
- Neville as manager of the England women's team in 2019

Personal information
- Full name: Philip John Neville
- Date of birth: 21 January 1977 (age 49)
- Place of birth: Bury, England
- Height: 5 ft 11 in (1.80 m)
- Positions: Full-back; midfielder

Youth career
- 1990–1994: Manchester United

Senior career*
Years	Team	Apps	(Gls)
1994–2005	Manchester United	263	(5)
2005–2013	Everton	242	(4)
Total		505	(9)

International career
1992–1993	England U16	10	(0)
1993–1995	England U18	6	(0)
1995–1996	England U21	7	(0)
2007	England B	1	(0)
1996–2007	England	59	(0)

Managerial career
- 2015: Salford City (caretaker)
- 2018–2021: England Women
- 2021–2023: Inter Miami
- 2023–2026: Portland Timbers
- * Club domestic league appearances and goals

Philip John Neville (born 21 January 1977) is an English football manager and former player who was most recently the head coach of Major League Soccer club Portland Timbers. He is also the co-owner of Salford City, along with several of his former Manchester United teammates.

After ten years as a professional with Manchester United, during which time he won six Premier League titles, three FA Cups, three FA Charity Shields, the Intercontinental Cup and the Champions League, he joined Everton in 2005, where he spent the final eight years of his playing career. Neville also played for England 59 times between 1996 and 2007, representing the nation at three European Championships. He could play in defence or midfield; due to this versatility, he operated in a number of different positions throughout his career, but was most often used as a left-back.

After earning his UEFA B Coaching Licence, Neville began his coaching career in 2012, filling in for Stuart Pearce with the England under-21s. He then worked as a coach at Manchester United, and as assistant manager to his brother Gary at Valencia in La Liga. On 23 January 2018, Neville was appointed head coach of the England women's team. He led the "Lionesses" to fourth place at the 2019 FIFA Women's World Cup.

== Club career ==
=== Manchester United ===
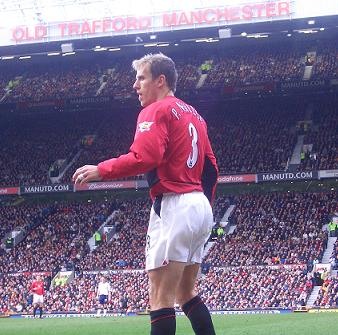
Neville in action at Old Trafford in March 2004

Born in Bury, Greater Manchester, Neville attended Elton High School, where he captained the football team for five years. Along with brother Gary, he joined the Manchester United Academy, signing associate schoolboy forms in September 1990. In the 1992–93 season, he played 23 times for the club's junior teams, including four times in the FA Youth Cup as the club attempted to defend the title Gary had won the previous season; Neville appeared alongside his brother in the second leg of the 1993 Youth Cup final, but they were unable to overturn a 2–0 deficit from the first leg at Old Trafford, and Leeds won 4–1 on aggregate. In July 1993, Neville signed a trainee contract with the club, and in October that year he made his debut for the reserve team, coming on for Darren Ferguson in a 2–0 win over Everton in The Central League. He went on to make eight appearances for the reserves in the 1993–94 season, as well as a further 31 for the junior teams, culminating in him winning the Jimmy Murphy Player of the Year Award in May 1994, followed by his first professional contract in June.

Neville made his senior debut for Manchester United on 28 January 1995 in a 5–2 win at home to Wrexham in the fourth round of the 1994–95 FA Cup. His league debut came two weeks later, when he started against Manchester City in the Manchester derby at Maine Road. He made one more first-team appearance in 1994–95, coming on as a substitute in a 1–0 win at home to Sheffield Wednesday. The following week, he captained United in both legs of the Youth Cup final against Tottenham Hotspur; after a 2–1 loss at White Hart Lane and a 1–0 win at Old Trafford, the tie came down to penalties; Neville missed his kick, but two misses from Spurs meant United won the shoot-out 4–3 to claim their second Youth Cup title in four seasons.

Neville's graduation and eventual establishment in the first-team meant he became known as one of "Fergie's Fledglings". On 19 August 1995, in the first game of the following season, he was substituted at half-time in a 3–1 loss at Aston Villa; the match is remembered for pundit Alan Hansen's "You can't win anything with kids" comment on Manchester United, who went on to win the double. He did not play at left-back frequently due to the presence of Denis Irwin; for some time, he played at right-back while his brother played in central defence, and in the 1996 FA Cup Final victory against Liverpool he played this position while Gary was an unused substitute. In the crucial league game against Newcastle United at St James' Park in March 1996 it was from Neville's cross that Eric Cantona scored the winning goal; a result which proved pivotal in the title race.

While at Manchester United, he was booked many times, such as in the 2002–03 season when he received 13 yellow cards, despite only starting 35 competitive games. In September 2003, Neville received a warning from The Football Association regarding his future conduct for his behaviour after Manchester United's game against rival side Arsenal.

While at Old Trafford, Neville helped United win six Premier League titles, three FA Cups and the UEFA Champions League.

=== Everton ===
==== Transfers and beginnings ====
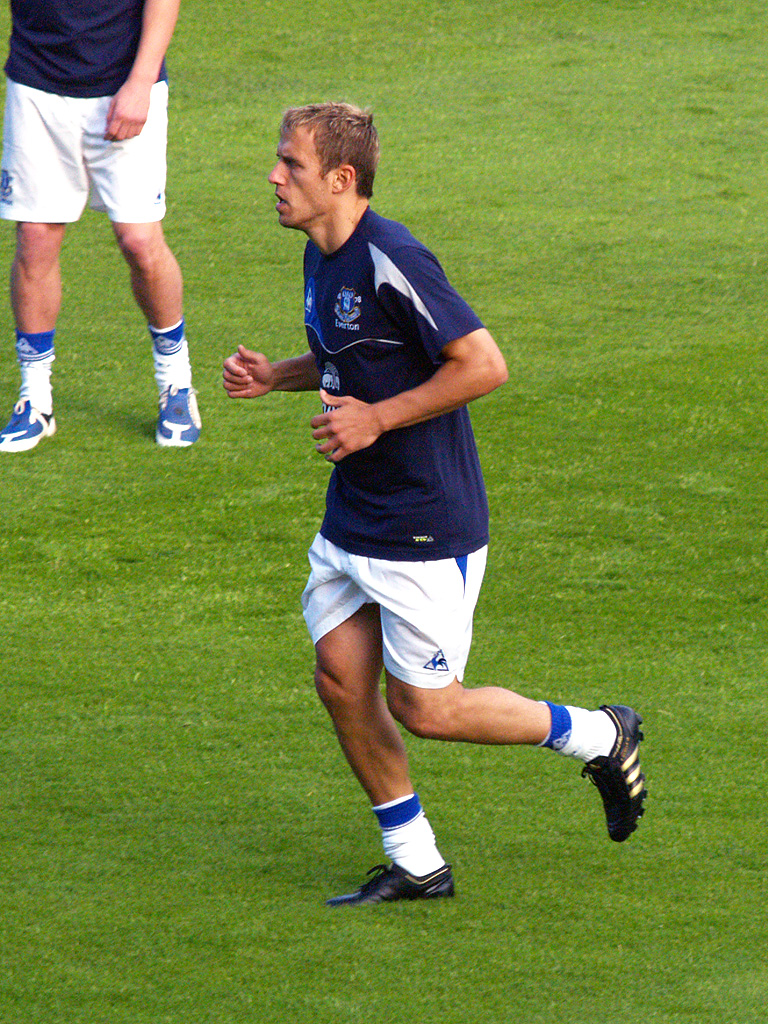
Neville warming up for Everton

On 4 August 2005, Neville joined Everton on a five-year contract for a fee in excess of £3 million. He made his debut in a UEFA Champions League qualifier against Villarreal, coming face-to-face with his former Manchester United colleague Diego Forlán. The following weekend, Neville made his Premier League debut for the Toffees, against Manchester United; The match marked the first time Phil and brother Gary had played for opposing teams.

==== Captaincy ====
Neville's attitude, work rate and willingness to play anywhere saw him become one of manager David Moyes' favourites. On 8 August 2006, Neville was announced as vice-captain to David Weir, and – on Weir's departure to Rangers in January 2007 – he became the club captain. In the Manchester United–Everton match on 29 November 2006, Phil and his brother Gary became the first siblings to captain their respective clubs against each other in the Premier League.

Neville commented in the press about the first ever red cards of his long career (he never received any playing for Manchester United), claiming that he would perhaps not have been booked in a game against Fulham if he had been playing for United. However, he finished with more cards than any other Premier League player in 2005–06 (including another red soon after his first). Neville scored his first goal for Everton in a 3–0 Premier League victory against Newcastle United on 30 December 2006.

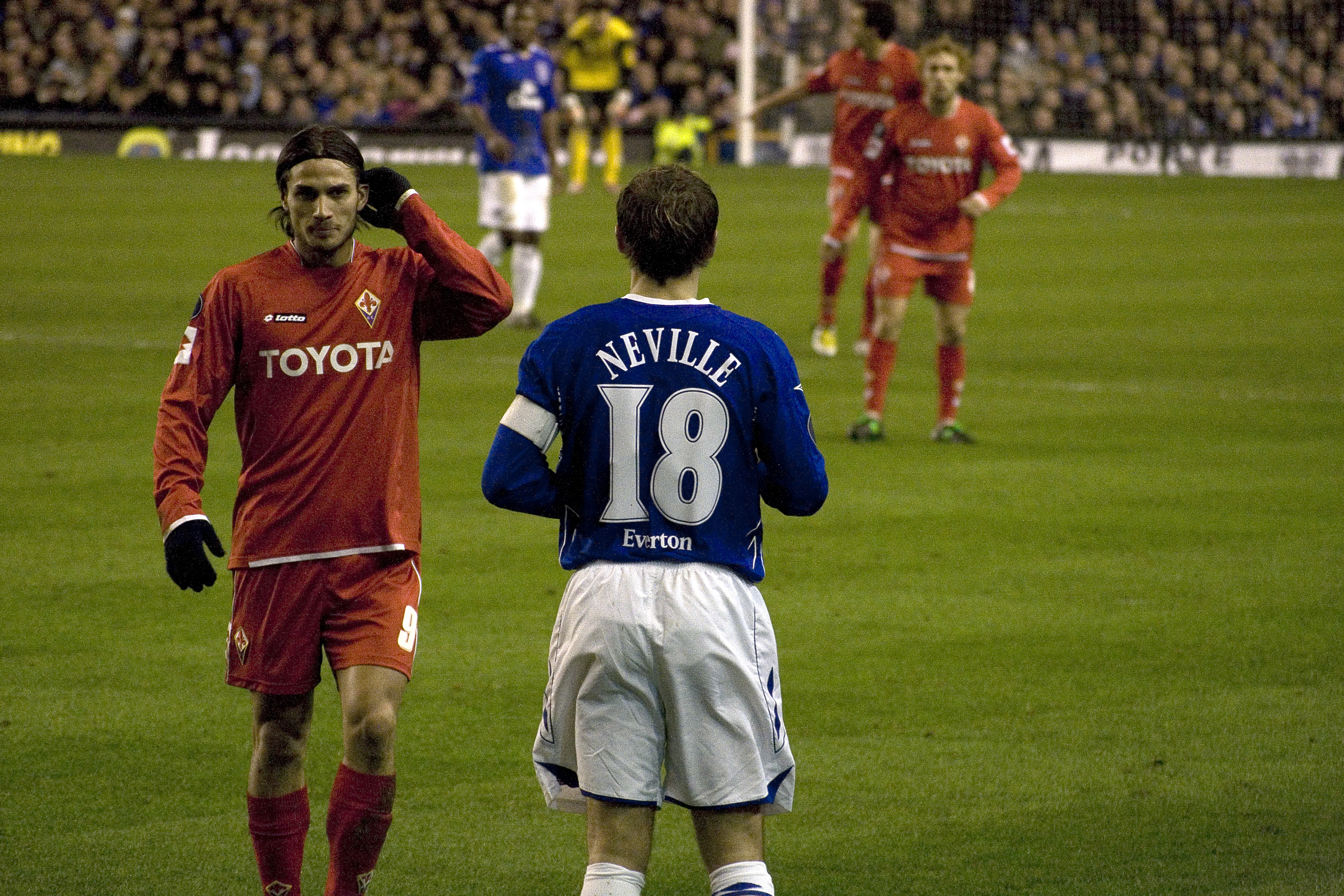
Neville playing for Everton against Fiorentina in the UEFA Cup in 2008

On 30 March 2008, Neville was assaulted by a Liverpool fan as he took a throw-in during the 1–0 Merseyside derby Premier League defeat at Anfield. On 24 April, the fan, 48-year-old Michael Blackmore, was later banned from all matches in England and Wales for three years after admitting common assault.

==== Later years and retirement ====
On 19 April 2009, Neville scored his penalty to help knock out his former club, Manchester United, in a penalty shoot-out in the semi-finals of the FA Cup, he sent the keeper the wrong way, putting it low to the keeper's right. On 19 February 2011, Neville scored the winning penalty in the penalty shoot-out against Chelsea to knock them out of the FA Cup, after a 1–1 draw at Stamford Bridge. On 9 April 2011, Neville scored against Wolves, his 12th senior goal and his first in three years. On 21 September, Neville scored in the League Cup game against West Bromwich Albion, this time a clinical effort, which was the deciding goal in the game. The goal was judged to be the Everton's goal of the season at the club's end of season awards.

On 9 April 2013, he announced that he would leave Everton at the end of the season when his contract ended. He subsequently announced his retirement from professional football.

== International career ==
Neville was regularly picked for England squads, making his debut against China on 23 May 1996. He played alongside his brother in this match; they had appeared together in the 1996 FA Cup Final two weeks earlier and thus were the first pair of brothers to play together in an FA Cup-final winning side and for England in the same season since Hubert and Francis Heron in 1876, 120 years earlier.

He was only briefly a regular first-choice player for the side, as a left-back in 2000 under Kevin Keegan's management. Under his successor Sven-Göran Eriksson, Ashley Cole was the preferred left back, followed by Wayne Bridge. Neville once briefly captained the side in a friendly match (a game in which England fielded four different captains). Despite having been in the England squad at the 1996, 2000 and 2004 European Championships, and having 59 England caps (23 as a substitute), Neville was never in an England World Cup squad.

Neville's England career included the honour of being the youngest member of Terry Venables' squad for Euro 96, though he never kicked a ball (his brother played in every match until the semi-finals). He was one of the players omitted at the last minute by Glenn Hoddle when he was selecting his final 22 for the 1998 World Cup, Hoddle's decision left Neville in tears, though media attention was almost entirely devoted to the exclusion of another player, Paul Gascoigne. Neville revealed in an interview that Gascoigne, not usually noted for his maturity, took the younger Neville brother under his wing and consoled him.

Keegan played Neville at left-back in Euro 2000; Neville received criticism and a large proportion of blame for England's exit, when he committed a late foul on Viorel Moldovan, leading to a penalty for Romania, which Ionel Ganea scored to win the match.

Neither of the Nevilles went to the 2002 World Cup – Phil was left out of the 23-man squad, while Gary was injured. Both were back in the squad for Euro 2004. The brothers played together for England for the first time in seven years in a friendly against Spain on 7 February 2007, which England lost 1–0. They hold the record number of England appearances by a pair of brothers (142) and the most starts in the same England team by two brothers (31).

Phil Neville was not included in Sven-Göran Eriksson's squad for the 2006 World Cup as Eriksson wanted to give young players a chance. However, he was drafted into Eriksson's stand-by group of players after Nigel Reo-Coker withdrew through injury. Neville remained in the England squad with new England manager Steve McClaren and started at right-back in September 2006 against Andorra. His final cap came in a Euro 2008 qualifying game against Estonia, and never played again. Fabio Capello attempted to call him up for England's 2010 World Cup squad after an injury crisis, but (not having expected a call-up) Neville had undergone knee surgery, ruling him out from playing.

== Style of play ==
Neville was primarily known for his work-rate and versatility as a footballer, and was capable of playing in several defensive and midfield positions; he was usually deployed as either a full-back or wing-back, and was capable of playing on the left side, as well as the right, despite being naturally right-footed; he was even able to play as a central midfielder. Although he was not the most spectacular or offensive-minded defender, and was occasionally criticised by pundits for his lack of pace, as well as his limited passing ability and skill on the ball, he was known to be a consistent player from a defensive standpoint, who also stood out for his leadership qualities. However, he also drew criticism in the media for his uncompromising nature and tendency to pick up cards. In 2010, Varun Mathure of Bleacher Report described him as one of the most underrated players in the Premier League.

== Managerial career ==
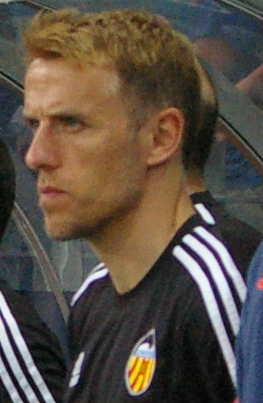
Neville serving as an assistant coach of Valencia in 2015

Neville holds a UEFA Pro Licence. In February 2012, it was reported that Neville would help England's Under-21s coaching staff in the absence of Stuart Pearce in the Under-21 European Championship qualifier against Belgium. The Everton captain received a special dispensation to help Brian Eastick prepare the side for the game at the Riverside Stadium in Middlesbrough, as Pearce would be in charge of the senior team in the friendly against the Netherlands at Wembley. England defeated Belgium 4–0. Continuing his work with the England under-21 side, in March 2013, it was announced that Neville would join the coaching staff of the England under-21s for the 2013 UEFA European Under-21 Football Championship.

In February 2013, Neville was being considered for the England U20 managerial position for the 2013 FIFA U-20 World Cup. In May 2013, Neville was interviewed by Bill Kenwright for the vacant manager's role at Everton, but the job went to Roberto Martínez. On 4 July 2013, Neville became first-team coach of Manchester United, where he would be reunited with manager David Moyes. It was announced on the same day Moyes named Ryan Giggs as player/coach.

In 2014, it was announced that Neville, along with fellow Manchester United players Gary Neville, Ryan Giggs, Paul Scholes and Nicky Butt had agreed a deal to purchase Salford City ahead of the 2014–15 season. with plans to get the club to the Football League. The group announced they would take part in a special friendly, with Salford facing a Class of '92 team. On 22 September, the group agreed to sell a 50% stake in the club to billionaire Peter Lim. Neville and Scholes briefly took charge of Salford City in a 2–1 home win over Kendal Town, following the sacking of Phil Power.

Neville joined La Liga side Valencia, also owned by Lim, as a coach under manager Nuno Espírito Santo in July 2015. On 30 November, after the resignation of Nuno, Neville was named as assistant to interim coach Voro, before his brother took the managerial position two days later.

=== England Women ===
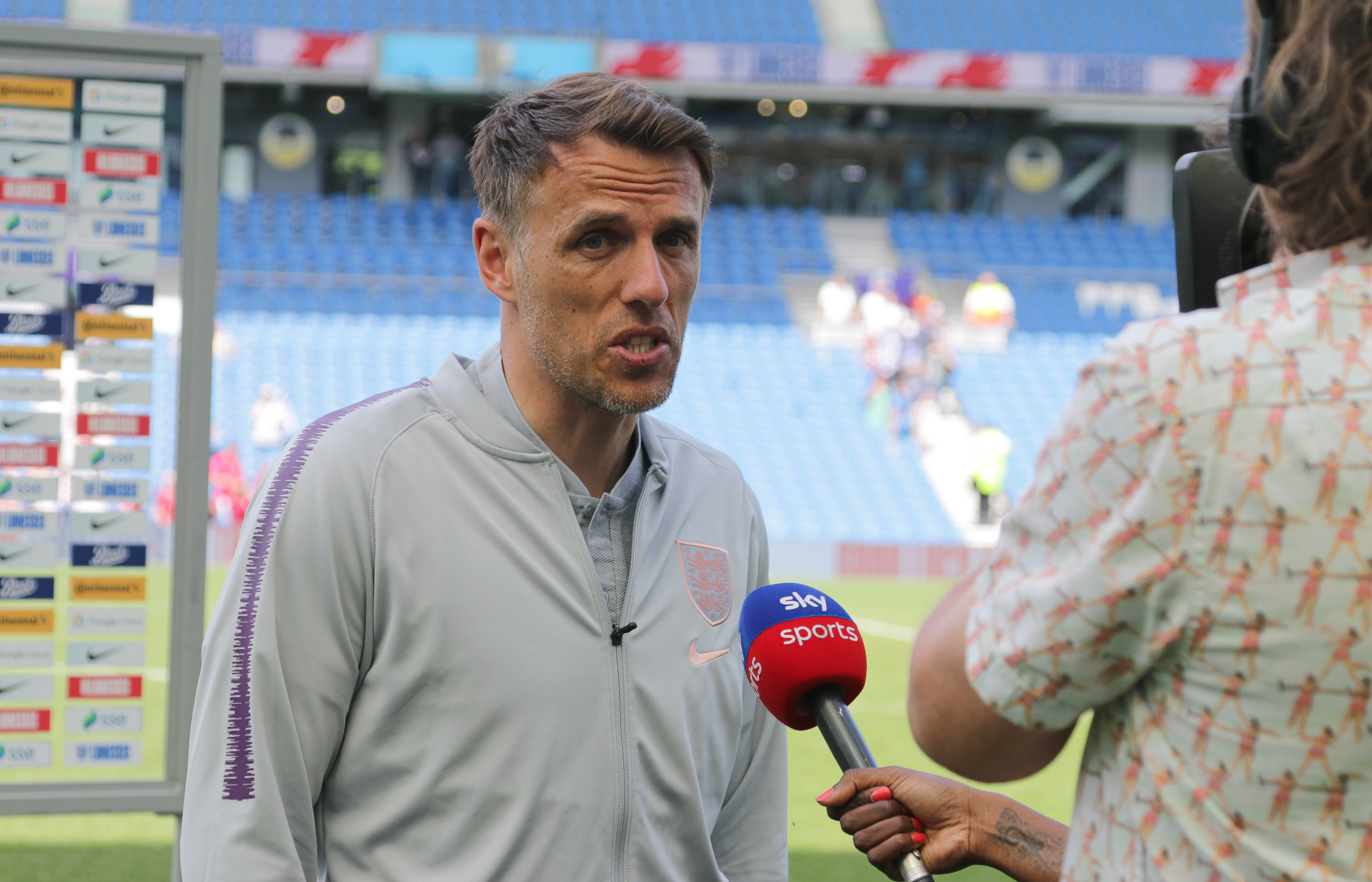
Phil Neville as England manager in a post match interview following a friendly against New Zealand in 2019.

On 23 January 2018, Neville was appointed head coach of the England women's national team, signing a contract that would run to the end of UEFA Women's Euro 2021.

Neville made his England managerial debut at the 2018 SheBelieves Cup, an annual invitational tournament held in the United States. On 1 March 2018, England won their opening game against France 4–1 before a 2–2 draw against Germany put the Lionesses in a position to win the competition with a victory in the final game against hosts United States. However, a 1–0 defeat saw them finish in second place. After an undefeated 2019 FIFA Women's World Cup qualification campaign, England returned to the SheBelieves tournament in 2019, this time facing Brazil and Japan as well as hosts United States again. A 2–1 victory over Brazil in the opening game and a 2–2 draw with the United States meant England won the tournament for the first time by defeating Japan 3–0 in the third game, even with the United States still to play their final game against Brazil.

England qualified for the 2019 FIFA Women's World Cup in France on 31 August 2018, with a 3–0 win over Wales.

Neville's England side finished first in Group D, with wins against Scotland, Argentina and Japan. After back-to-back 3–0 wins against Cameroon and Norway, England reached their second consecutive Women's World Cup semi-final and also secured Team GB one of the three qualifying places allocated to UEFA for the 2020 Summer Olympics. On 2 July 2019, England lost 2–1 to the United States in the semi-finals. Four days later, following a 2–1 defeat to Sweden in the third place play-off, England ended the World Cup in fourth place. He came under fire for his postgame comments, calling the bronze medal match a "nonsense game."

On 30 June 2019, the FA announced that Neville would be appointed manager of Team GB Women for the 2020 Summer Olympics following England's successful de facto qualification performance at the 2019 World Cup.

In the wake of the World Cup exit, England's form dropped as the Lionesses struggled in a series of friendlies to end the year including a 2–1 defeat by Germany at Wembley on 9 November 2019. The game set a new record attendance for an England women's match at 77,768. The poor run continued into 2020 as England failed to defend their title at the 2020 SheBelieves Cup in March. Losses to the United States and Spain made it seven defeats in 11 games, the team's worst stretch since 2003, mounting further pressure on Neville who admitted he was personally responsible for England's "unacceptable" form amid increased media scrutiny. On 22 April 2020, Neville announced he would be leaving his position as manager in July 2021 when his contract was due to expire. As Euro 2021, set to be hosted in England, was pushed back a year to 2022 in the wake of the COVID-19 pandemic, Neville would no longer lead the team at the tournament. Despite initially stating he would see out his contract, Neville stepped down as manager of England, and Team GB on 18 January 2021 amid speculation linking him to the vacant Inter Miami CF job.

=== Inter Miami ===
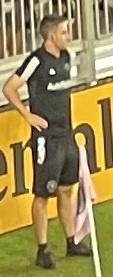
Neville coaching for Inter Miami in 2023

On 18 January 2021, Neville was appointed as the head coach of Inter Miami, a club owned by his former Manchester United teammate and current Salford City co-owner David Beckham. He made his debut on 18 April as the team lost 3–2 at home to LA Galaxy in their season opener. After twelve games, Inter Miami had won just two games and had the worst record in MLS. In October, he was fined by MLS for calling for an investigation into referees' calls against his team, while on the pitch his team had their second six-game losing run of the season. The team finished their debut season 11th of 14 in the Eastern Conference.

In Inter Miami's first season of the U.S. Open Cup in 2022, Neville led them to the last 16 before a penalty shootout loss at Florida neighbours Orlando City on 25 May. In his second MLS season as head coach, the club reached the MLS Cup playoffs for the first time in their history by finishing sixth in the Eastern Conference, before a 3–0 loss at New York City FC in the first round on 17 October 2022. On 7 November, he extended his contract.

On 1 June 2023, Inter Miami announced that the club had parted ways with Neville. At the time, the club was in last place in the Eastern Conference. "Sometimes in this game we have to make the toughest decisions and sadly we feel the time is right to make a change," said Beckham.

=== Canada ===
Shortly after departing Miami, Neville was announced to be joining John Herdman's staff ahead of Canada's participation in the 2023 CONCACAF Nations League final and the 2023 CONCACAF Gold Cup.

=== Portland Timbers ===
On 6 November 2023, Neville was named the head coach of the Portland Timbers on a contract that runs through the 2026 MLS season. His hiring was criticised by fans and the team's largest supporters group, due to past sexist remarks that Neville made on Twitter in 2012.

On his debut on 24 February 2024, Neville won 4–1 at home to Colorado Rapids. The Timbers finished the 2024 season in 9th place in the Western Conference and made the wild-card round for the 2024 MLS Cup playoffs, losing 5–0 at the Vancouver Whitecaps on 23 October. A year later, the team made the first round of the playoffs, losing 4–0 away to San Diego FC in the decisive game.

On May 25, 2026 after a 3-1 loss at home against San Jose Earthquakes, the Portland Timbers announced that they would be parting ways with Neville, ending his 2-and-a-half year tenure with the club.

== Media career ==
He regularly appears as a pundit on football radio commentaries, and has appeared as a pundit on the BBC's Match of the Day programme. In November 2010, he became a top-trending Twitter term after a strong performance against Tottenham Hotspur's Gareth Bale led to a tongue-in-cheek "Chuck Norris"-style internet phenomenon.

Neville was employed by BBC One as a commentator and pundit during the 2014 FIFA World Cup. His commentary of the England–Italy match on 14 June attracted 445 complaints for his "lack of emotion and 'monotone style'". He reflected on this in an online article by stating: "I played it back the next day and it did not sound like it was me commentating. I was trying to be somebody I wasn't, and I knew I could do better than that".

The BBC received further complaints for Neville's comments in January 2015, after Arsenal's Tomáš Rosický played a pass while looking in another direction; Neville said that if he were playing against a player doing that in training, he would deliberately injure that player. He admitted making an unacceptable comment, while the BBC stated that the tone of discussion was light-hearted enough to suggest Neville was not endorsing violence.

After departing from Valencia in 2016, he joined Sky Sports as a pundit for their coverage of the Premier League along with his brother Gary, who rejoined.

== Personal life ==
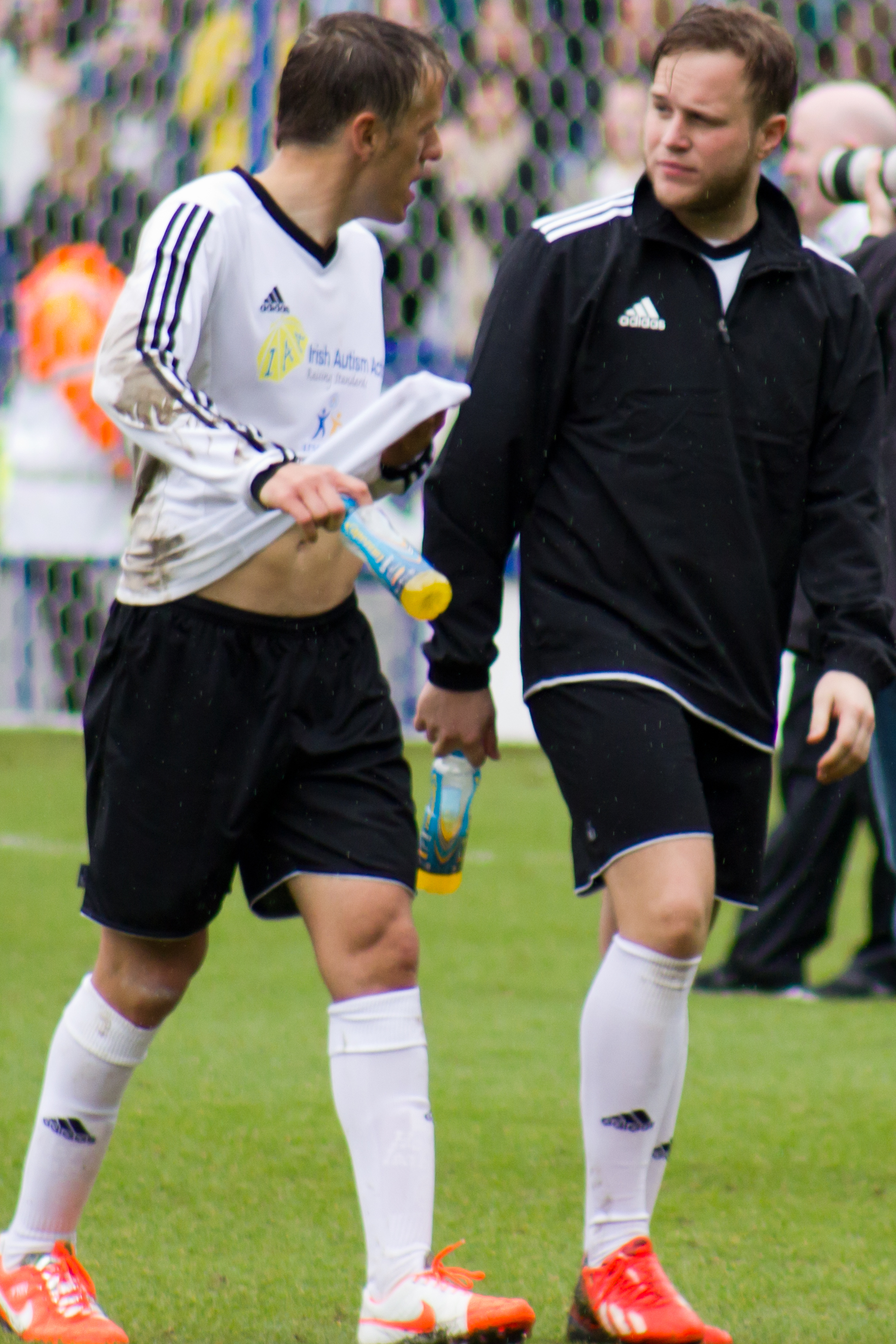
Neville and pop singer Olly Murs in a 2014 charity football match

Neville attended Elton High School with his siblings. While in school, he captained his school football team throughout the whole five years he was there. Neville was also a talented cricketer in his youth, and a contemporary of England all-rounder Andrew Flintoff in Lancashire's Under-19 side, captaining England Under-15s. Neville holds the record for being the youngest player to play for Lancashire's second XI at age 15. Flintoff described Neville as a "cricketing genius" whose talents could have compared to Ricky Ponting or Sachin Tendulkar, if he had chosen a cricket career.

Neville is the younger brother of fellow former Manchester United defender Gary Neville, and the twin brother of former international and former England netball head coach Tracey Neville. His father, Neville Neville, was commercial director of Football League club Bury. His mother, Jill, used to play netball in the local leagues, and worked as general manager and club secretary for Bury.

Neville is married to Julie (née Killilea); the couple have a son, Harvey, and a daughter, Isabella. Harvey has represented the Republic of Ireland national under-19 football team, being eligible despite being born in England as Neville's wife is of Irish descent.

He made the property headlines in April 2008, when he struggled to sell his £4 million mansion in Lancashire. In May 2009, he accepted a £2.6 million cash offer for the house from local businessman Matthew Greensmith.

Neville became vegetarian in 2014, after a challenge from his wife to try the diet for two weeks. He said in a PETA video that "I started to feel healthier, leaner. I started to feel great."

=== Philanthropy ===
Neville's daughter Isabella has cerebral palsy, which has led to Neville becoming an ambassador of Bliss, the special care baby charity, and a patron of Royal Manchester Children's Hospital's New Children's Hospital Appeal. Neville has also raised money for the Good Life Orphanage in Kenya and the Warrington Youth Club. Neville co-founded Foundation 92 with Gary Neville, Ryan Giggs, Nicky Butt, and Paul Scholes, all teammates who met playing for Manchester United in 1992. The organization supports wellbeing and outreach programs for the Salford and Greater Manchester community.

== Career statistics ==
=== Club ===
Appearances and goals by club, season and competition
Club	Season	League			FA Cup		League Cup		Europe		Other		Total	
Club	Season	Division	Apps	Goals	Apps	Goals	Apps	Goals	Apps	Goals	Apps	Goals	Apps	Goals
Manchester United	1994–95	Premier League	2	0	1	0	0	0	0	0	0	0	3	0
Manchester United	1995–96	Premier League	24	0	7	0	2	0	1 (Note: Appearances in UEFA Cup)	0	–		34	0
Manchester United	1996–97	Premier League	18	0	0	0	1	0	4 (Note: Appearances in UEFA Champions League)	0	1 (Note: Appearance in FA Charity Shield)	0	24	0
Manchester United	1997–98	Premier League	30	1	3	0	1	0	7	0	1	0	42	1
Manchester United	1998–99	Premier League	28	0	7	0	2	0	6	1	1	0	44	1
Manchester United	1999–2000	Premier League	29	0	–		0	0	9	0	5 (Note: One appearance in FA Charity Shield, one appearance in UEFA Super Cup, three appearances in FIFA Club World Championship)	0	43	0
Manchester United	2000–01	Premier League	29	1	1	0	2	0	6	0	0	0	38	1
Manchester United	2001–02	Premier League	28	2	2	0	1	0	7	0	0	0	38	2
Manchester United	2002–03	Premier League	25	1	2	1	4	0	12	0	–		43	2
Manchester United	2003–04	Premier League	31	0	3	0	1	0	7	1	1 (Note: Appearance in FA Community Shield)	0	43	1
Manchester United	2004–05	Premier League	19	0	5	0	3	0	6	0	1	0	34	0
Manchester United	Total		263	5	31	1	17	0	65	2	10	0	386	8
Everton	2005–06	Premier League	34	0	4	0	1	0	4 (Note: Two appearances in UEFA Champions League, two appearances in UEFA Cup)	0	–		43	0
Everton	2006–07	Premier League	35	1	1	0	2	0	–		–		38	1
Everton	2007–08	Premier League	37	2	0	0	5	0	8	0	–		50	2
Everton	2008–09	Premier League	37	0	7	0	1	0	2	0	–		47	0
Everton	2009–10	Premier League	23	0	2	0	0	0	4 (Note: Appearances in UEFA Europa League)	0	–		29	0
Everton	2010–11	Premier League	31	1	3	0	1	0	–		–		35	1
Everton	2011–12	Premier League	27	0	6	0	3	1	–		–		36	1
Everton	2012–13	Premier League	18	0	5	0	2	0	–		–		25	0
Everton	Total		242	4	28	0	15	1	18	0	–		303	5
Career total			505	9	59	1	32	1	83	2	10	0	689	13

=== International ===
Appearances and goals by national team and year
National team	Year	Apps	Goals
England	1996	1	0
England	1997	7	0
England	1998	5	0
England	1999	9	0
England	2000	8	0
England	2001	4	0
England	2002	3	0
England	2003	7	0
England	2004	6	0
England	2005	2	0
England	2006	2	0
England	2007	5	0
Total		59	0

== Managerial statistics ==
As of match played 23 May 2026

Managerial record by team and tenure
Team	From	To	Record				
Team	From	To	P	W	D	L	Win %
Salford City (caretaker)	3 January 2015	3 January 2015	1	1	0	0	100.00
England Women	17 January 2018	18 January 2021	35	19	5	11	54.29
Inter Miami	18 January 2021	1 June 2023	90	35	13	42	38.89
Portland Timbers	6 November 2023	25 May 2026	95	33	26	36	34.74
Total			221	88	44	89	39.82

== Honours ==
=== Player ===
Manchester United

- Premier League: 1995–96, 1996–97, 1998–99, 1999–2000, 2000–01, 2002–03
- FA Cup: 1995–96, 1998–99, 2003–04
- FA Charity / Community Shield: 1996, 1997, 2003
- UEFA Champions League: 1998–99
- Intercontinental Cup: 1999
- Football League Cup runner-up: 2002–03

Everton

- FA Cup runner-up: 2008–09

England

- Tournoi de France: 1997

Individual

- Jimmy Murphy Young Player of the Year: 1993–94

=== Manager ===
England Women

- SheBelieves Cup: 2019

== See also ==
- List of footballers in England by number of league appearances (500+)
