= Michael J. Ryan (Philadelphia politician) =

American politician (1862–1943)

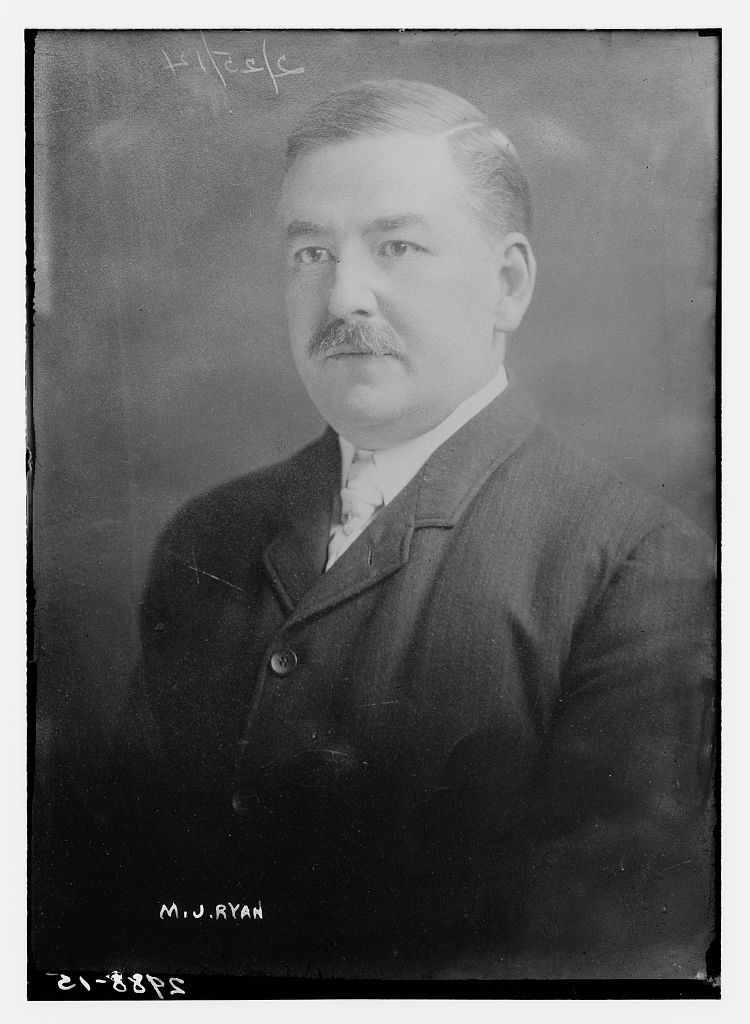
Michael J. Ryan

Michael J. Ryan (1862–1943), born in Philadelphia, was city solicitor of Philadelphia. He was also the national president of the United Irish League of America, starting in 1906.

== Biography ==
The 1919 Irish Race Convention named Ryan, Edward Fitzsimmons Dunne, and Frank Patrick Walsh as members of the American Commission on Irish Independence. They attended the Paris Peace Conference of 1919 to argue unsuccessfully for recognition of the newly proclaimed Irish Republic.
