= J. Michael Ryan =

American judge (born 1957)

Michael Ryan

Associate Judge of the Superior Court of the District of Columbia
- Incumbent
- Assumed office January 16, 2004
- President: George W. Bush
- Preceded by: seat established by Public Law number 107-114

Personal details
- Born: Joseph Michael Francis Ryan, III; June 20, 1957 (age 68); D.C. metropolitan area
- Education: College of William and Mary (BA); George Washington University (JD)

Joseph Michael Francis Ryan III (born June 20, 1957) is an associate judge of the Superior Court of the District of Columbia.

== Education and career ==
Ryan earned his Bachelor of Arts from College of William and Mary in 1979 and his Juris Doctor from National Law Center at George Washington University in 1982.

After graduating, Ryan clerked for Judge Richard B. Latham of the Sixth Judicial Circuit Court in Montgomery County, Maryland. From 1985 to 2002, he was a staff attorney at the Public Defender Service for the District of Columbia.

=== D.C. Superior Court ===
President George W. Bush nominated Ryan on January 21, 2003, to a 15-year term as an associate judge of the Superior Court of the District of Columbia. On June 18, 2003, the Senate Committee on Homeland Security and Governmental Affairs held a hearing on his nomination. On October 22, 2003, the Committee reported his nomination favorably to the senate floor. On October 24, 2003, the full Senate confirmed his nomination by voice vote. He was sworn in on January 16, 2004.
