= Mike Ryan (footballer, born 1930) =

English footballer

Personal information
- Full name: Michael Joseph Ryan
- Date of birth: 14 October 1930
- Place of birth: Welwyn Garden City, Hertfordshire, England
- Date of death: September 2006 (aged 75)
- Place of death: Ealing, London, England
- Height: 5 ft 7 in (1.70 m)
- Position: Winger

Senior career*
Years	Team	Apps	(Gls)
- Chase of Chertsey
1948–1952	Arsenal	0	(0)
1952–1953	Lincoln City	7	(0)
1953–1954	York City	4	(0)
- Yeovil Town
Total		11	(0)
- * Club domestic league appearances and goals

Michael Joseph Ryan (14 October 1930 – September 2006) was an English professional footballer who played as a winger in the Football League for Lincoln City and York City, in non-League football for Chase of Chertsey and Yeovil Town, and was on the books of Arsenal without making a league appearance.
