= Michael J. Ryan (biologist) =

American biologist

Michael Joseph Ryan
- Education: University of California Berkeley, Cornell University, Rutgers University, Glassboro State College
- Awards: Fellow of the American Association for the Advancement of Science, Fellow of the American Academy of Arts and Sciences, Clark Hubbs Regents Professor in Zoology, 1997 Guggenheim Fellow, 2008 Joseph Grinnell Medal, 2010 E.O. Wilson Naturalist Award, 2011 ING Professor of Excellence, 2011 Fellow Wissenschaftskolleg zu Berlin, 1982-84 Miller Fellow
- Scientific career
- Fields: evolutionary biology, sexual selection, animal communication, animal behavior
- Workplaces: The University of Texas at Austin, Smithsonian Tropical Research Institute

Michael Joseph Ryan is an American biologist, author, Clark Hubbs Regents Professor in Zoology in the Department of Integrative Biology at the University of Texas at Austin, and Senior Research Associate at the Smithsonian Tropical Research Institute in Panama. He is considered to be a prominent expert in the fields of sexual selection and animal communication. Ryan has authored over 300 peer-reviewed scientific articles and publications on the evolution and mechanisms of animal behavior. His book The Túngara Frog: A Study of Sexual Selection and Communication is regarded as a classic in his field. He lives in Austin, Texas.

== Bibliography ==
- Ryan, Michael (2018). A taste for the beautiful: the evolution of attraction. Princeton: Princeton University Press. ISBN 978-0-691-16726-8.
- Ryan, Michael (2011). An introduction to animal behavior: an integrative approach. Cold Spring Harbor, N.Y: Cold Spring Harbor Laboratory Press. ISBN 978-0-879698-58-4.
- Ryan, Michael (2001). Anuran communication. Washington, DC: Smithsonian Institution Press. ISBN 1-56098-973-4.
- Wilczynski, Walter; Ryan, Michael J. (1999-03-25). "Geographic Variation in Animal Communication Systems". Geographic Variation in Behavior. Oxford University Press. doi:10.1093/oso/9780195082951.003.0015. ISBN 978-0-19-508295-1.
- Fritzsch, Bernd; Ryan, Michael (1988). The Evolution of the amphibian auditory system. New York: Wiley. ISBN 978-0-471-84809-7. OCLC 16129170.
- Ryan, Michael (1985). The túngara frog: a study in sexual selection and communication. Chicago: University of Chicago Press. ISBN 978-0-226-73229-9.

=== Notable Research Publications ===
- Kirkpatrick, Mark; Ryan, Michael J. (1991). "The evolution of mating preferences and the paradox of the lek". Nature. 350 (6313). Springer Science and Business Media LLC: 33–38. Bibcode:1991Natur.350...33K. doi:10.1038/350033a0. ISSN 0028-0836. S2CID 4366707.
- RYAN, M. J. (1980-07-25). "Female Mate Choice in a Neotropical Frog". Science. 209 (4455). American Association for the Advancement of Science (AAAS): 523–525. Bibcode:1980Sci...209..523R. doi:10.1126/science.209.4455.523. ISSN 0036-8075. PMID 17831371. S2CID 13302478.
- Ryan, Michael J.; Fox, James H.; Wilczynski, Walter; Rand, A. Stanley (1990). "Sexual selection for sensory exploitation in the frog Physalaemus pustulosus". Nature. 343 (6253). Springer Science and Business Media LLC: 66–67. Bibcode:1990Natur.343...66R. doi:10.1038/343066a0. ISSN 0028-0836. PMID 2296291. S2CID 4358189.
- Taylor, R. C.; Ryan, M. J. (2013-06-06). "Interactions of Multisensory Components Perceptually Rescue Tungara Frog Mating Signals". Science. 341 (6143). American Association for the Advancement of Science (AAAS): 273–274. Bibcode:2013Sci...341..273T. doi:10.1126/science.1237113. ISSN 0036-8075. PMID 23744778. S2CID 40706179.
- Ryan, Michael J. (2021-02-16). "Darwin, sexual selection, and the brain". Proceedings of the National Academy of Sciences. 118 (8) e2008194118. Bibcode:2021PNAS..11808194R. doi:10.1073/pnas.2008194118. ISSN 0027-8424. PMC 7923531. PMID 33593899.
