= Rocky Ryan =

"Rocky Ryan" directs here. For the American football player, see Rocky Ryan (American football).

Michael Joseph "Rocky" Ryan (30 December 1937 – 15 January 2004) was a British media hoaxer, who became known in the UK for providing newspapers with numerous stories that turned out to be fabrications. Earlier in his life, he had been a small-time criminal and film stuntman.

Ryan was born in Tipperary, Ireland, and in his youth served time in borstals. He was involved in film stunt work, and was injured during work in 1975 on The Slipper and the Rose, released the following year. He began his series of hoaxes in the mid-1970s, he said, after one newspaper contacted the police (falsely) claiming he was Donald Neilson, known as the Black Panther, the armed robber and murderer.

Ryan used numerous aliases, showing an ability with accents, when he gave stories to the press, including Major Travis, Peter Bernstein, David Oppenheimer, and Rocco Salvatore. The last name, supposedly a businessman, was used to dupe The Daily Telegraph into believing the contact was involved in a military coup in the Seychelles. Other stories concocted by Ryan included his claim to The Sun that the kidnapped racehorse Shergar was alive and well and living in Jersey, and telling the same newspaper Peter Sutcliffe, the Yorkshire Ripper, was being allowed out of Broadmoor to attend discos. A tip off that the vanished Lord Lucan was hiding in South Africa led the Daily Express to send one of their staff to investigate. Another newspaper published a false story about Koo Stark, a former girlfriend of Prince Andrew, which led to a libel action and the award of £300,000 in damages.

Threatening behaviour towards The Observer journalist Farzad Bazoft, and threats to the journalist's family, ended up in court and Ryan was bound over. Ryan told The Independent in 1993 he had tipped off the Iraqis that Bazoft was spying for Iran and Israel as a result of the personal grudge. Bazoft was executed for spying by Saddam Hussein's government in 1990; Ryan's involvement in the case is unconfirmed.

In a 1993 interview with The Independent newspaper, believed to have been given by Ryan himself, he claimed to have been born Michael Rocco Ryan, with his mother being of Sicilian origin, and to have been raised in the East End of London with the Kray twins. In fact, only the part about the East End and the Krays is true.

After a stroke in 2001, which affected a hand, Ryan became a recluse. An inquest after he died found that a potentially lethal dose of painkillers was in his body. The coroner recorded an open verdict.
