= Sport in Wales =

Sport in Wales plays a prominent role in Welsh culture. Like the other countries of the United Kingdom, Wales enjoys independent representation in major world sporting events such as the FIFA World Cup and in the Rugby World Cup, but competes as part of Great Britain in some other competitions, including the Olympics.

The Millennium Stadium is the largest stadium in Wales. Located in Cardiff, it is the home of the Wales national rugby union team with a capacity of 74,505. It was the temporary location for English football and rugby league finals during the redevelopment of Wembley Stadium. The Cardiff City Stadium is currently the home of the Wales national football team.

Sport Wales is responsible for sport in Wales.

In 2008/09, Cardiff had the highest percentage (61%) of residents who regularly participated in sport and active recreation out of all 22 local authorities in Wales, whereas Rhondda Cynon Taf had the lowest (24%).

== Native Celtic sports ==
The native games that developed in Wales share a Celtic heritage with coeval sports in Cornwall, Scotland and Ireland. A number of sports are recorded, including variations of 'village football', 'bat and ball' and 'hand ball' games. The most prominent native sports to survive into modern Welsh history are Bando, Cnapan and Pêl-Llaw.

=== Bando ===
Bando is a team sport that is related to hockey, hurling, shinty, and bandy which was first recorded in Wales in the eighteenth century. The game is played on a large level field between teams of up to thirty players each of them equipped with a bando: a curve-ended stick resembling that used in field hockey. Although no formal rules are known, the objective of the game was to strike a ball between two marks which served as goals at either end of the pitch. Popular throughout Glamorgan, the sport had all but vanished by the end of the nineteenth century. Now a minority sport, the game is still played in parts of Wales where it has become an Easter tradition.

=== Cnapan ===
Cnapan (sometimes spelt Knapan or Knappan) is an ancient form of medieval football, with similarities to both rugby union and rugby league, and is cited as a possible antecedent to modern rugby union. The game is most associated with the western counties of Wales, especially Carmarthenshire, Ceredigion and Pembrokeshire.

According to George Owen of Henllys, in his Description of Pembrokeshire (1603), cnapan had been "extremely popular in Pembrokeshire since greate antiquitie [sic]". The game ceased as a regular competition in 1995, but its cultural legacy remains in the western counties – an example being the "Cnapan Hotel" in Newport, Pembrokeshire.

=== Pêl-Llaw ===
Welsh handball, more commonly known as "Pêl-Llaw", is related to Irish handball, Fives, Basque pelota and later American handball and has been continually attested since the Middle Ages. The sports popularity offered ordinary people opportunities through prize-money, bookkeeping and even player professionalism. Pêl-law has been described as "Wales’ first national sport".

== Other sports ==
=== Rugby union ===
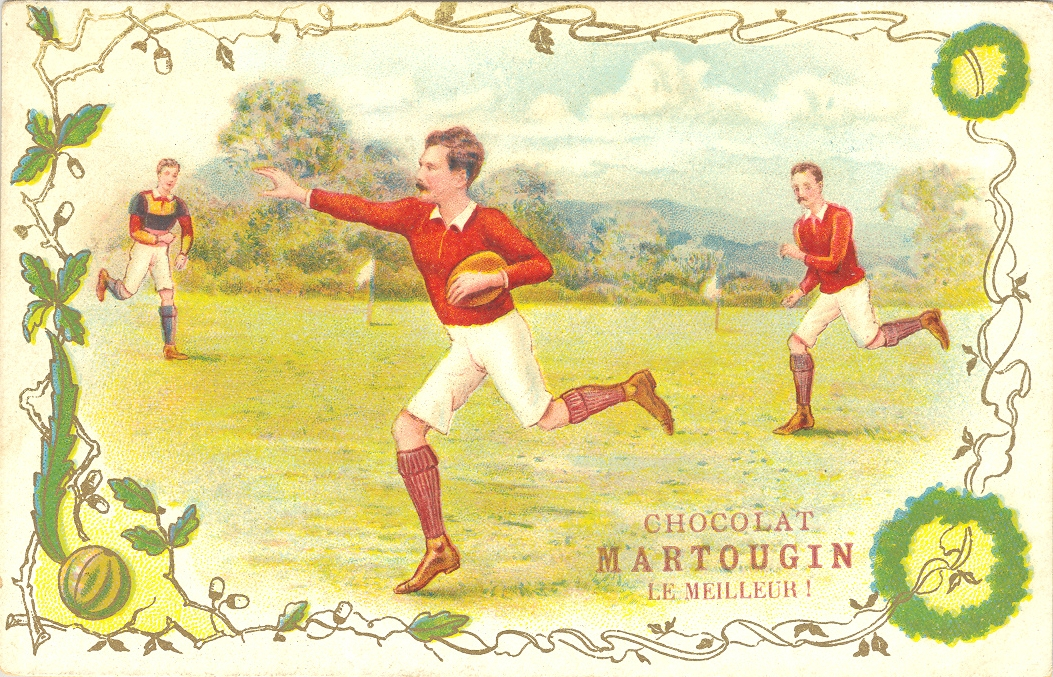
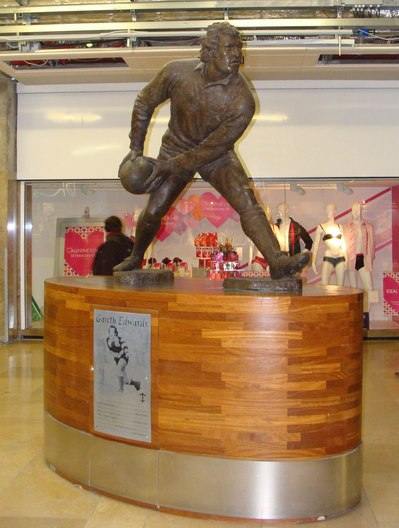
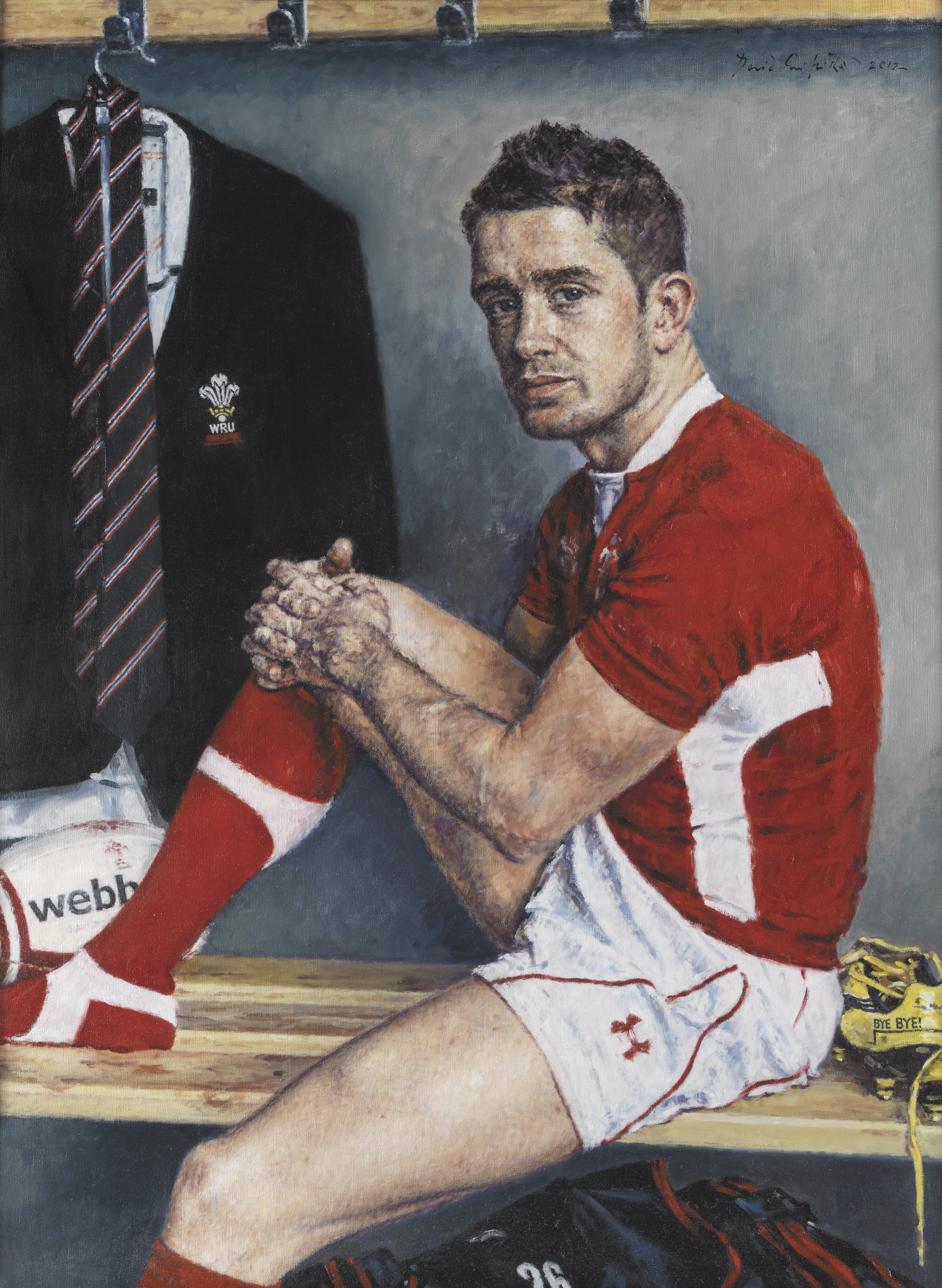
Depictions of the star Welsh Rugby Union players Arthur Gould, Gareth Edwards and Shane Williams

Rugby union is often stated to be central to Welsh culture, with the Encyclopaedia of Wales stating that the sport is "seen by many as a symbol of Welsh identity and an expression of national consciousness". Indigenous Welsh sports such as cnapan have also been identified as possible antecedents of both rugby union and rugby league. The famous 1905 match which became known as The Match of the Century has been viewed as a key moment in the relationship between Welsh national identity and Rugby Union, especially the home crowd singing Hen Wlad Fy Nhadau as a response to the Haka (often cited as the first time a national anthem was sung before an international sports event).

Outside of Wales, rugby union has been associated with the country and its culture from the nineteenth century onwards, and a perception of both Welsh men and women being "addicted" to rugby union became a stereotypical characteristics early in the sport's history. After The Original All Blacks game against Newport RFC at Rodney Parade in 1905, a journalist from the Daily Mail reported that "The average woman in Newport, judging from the expert feminine criticisms punctuating Saturday’s play, apparently knows as much of the science of rugby [union] as any man." Another reporter stating that "fully a third" of the spectators at Stradey Park, Llanelli were female.

Today, both the Women's national team and Men's national team takes part in the annual Six Nations Championship and the Rugby World Cup. The Men's sevens team won the 2009 Rugby World Cup Sevens, and is one of 15 "core teams" in the annual World Rugby Sevens Series. Four Welsh teams (Cardiff Rugby, Dragons RFC, Ospreys and Scarlets) compete in the professional United Rugby Championship, the European Rugby Champions Cup and the European Rugby Challenge Cup with semi-professional teams competing in the Welsh Premier Division, the WRU Challenge Cup and Welsh Championship. In total, 320 rugby union clubs are affiliated with the Welsh Rugby Union.

=== Rugby league ===
Early attempts made to bring rugby league to Wales in the 20th century, was the formation of the short-lived Welsh League in 1908 which was followed by the second Welsh League which ran from 1949 until 1955. There are currently two professional rugby league clubs in Wales, the North Wales Crusaders (previously known as Celtic Crusaders and Crusaders RL) based in Colwyn Bay (formerly in Wrexham) who played in the Super League from 2009–11, and Llanelli based West Wales Raiders. They both compete in League 1, the third tier of British Rugby League.

The Rugby League Conference Welsh Premier is the top division for rugby league clubs in Wales and the division below is the Rugby League Conference Welsh Championship

The national side, nicknamed the Dragons, has often been one of the strongest sides in international rugby league and has also provided a number of players for the Great Britain team. They compete in the European Nations Cup and the World Cup. The national side competed in the 2011 Four Nations, finishing last in the table.

The Wales Rugby League achieved governing body status in 2005.

=== Football ===
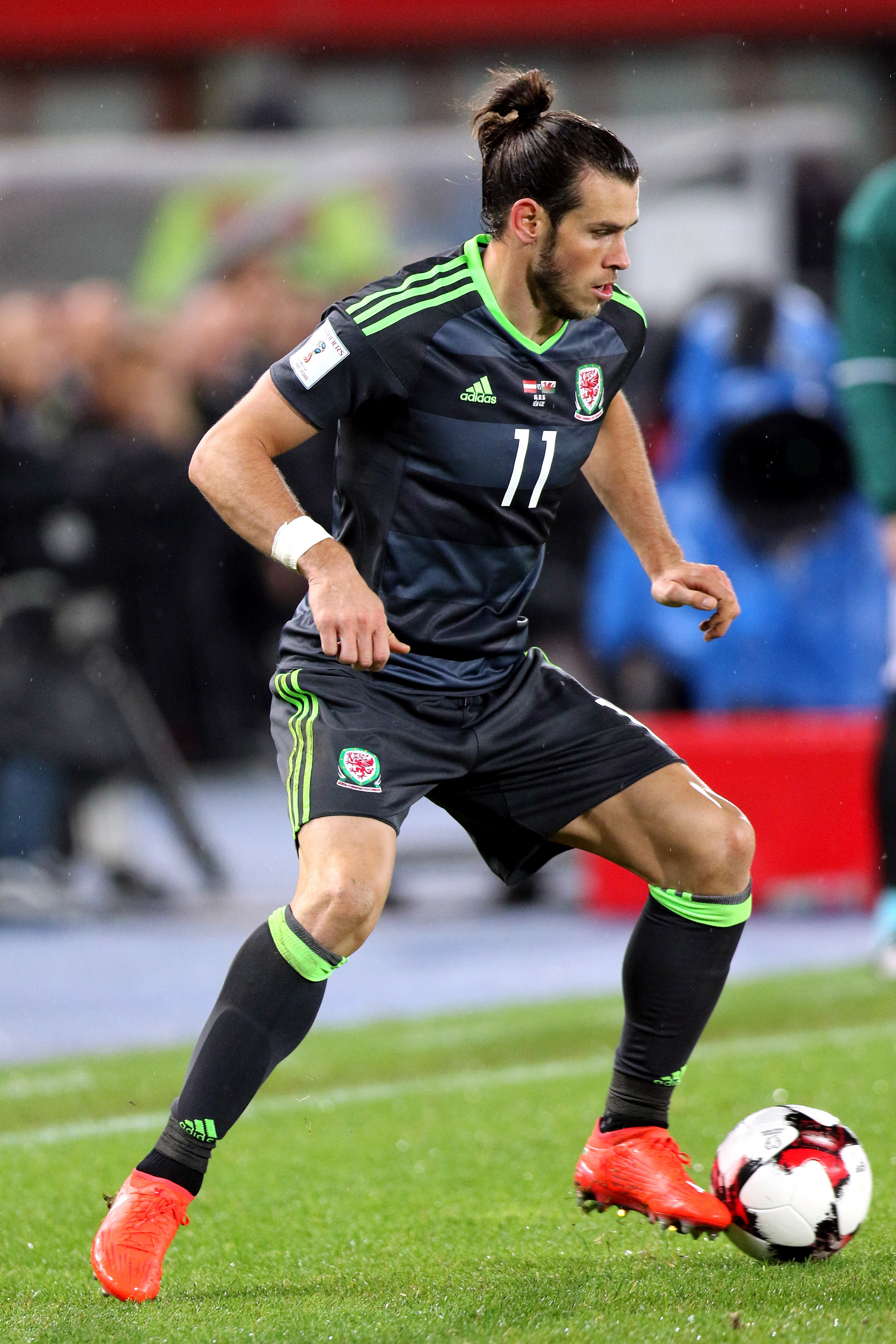
Gareth Bale playing football for Wales versus Austria

The governing body for football in Wales is the Football Association of Wales. It runs the national teams, the recreational game and the main cup competitions. Dragon Park, the Wales National Football Development Centre, is located in Newport.

Football developed in the late 19th century, and currently claims the most participation of any sport in Wales. The most successful teams are Cardiff City, Swansea City, Newport County, Wrexham and The New Saints. Cardiff City were the most successful in the 20th century, having won the FA Cup in 1927 and spent 15 seasons in the top-flight English First Division. Swansea City have also played in the top flight, playing two consecutive seasons in the early 1980s, and were the first Welsh team to win promotion to the English Premier League in 2011. Swansea stayed in the Premier League for the next 7 years and also won the EFL Cup in the 2013-2014 season after winning 5-0 in the final and earned a spot in the UEFA Europa League. Newport County have played in the second tier of the English football league system and reached the quarter-finals of the 1981 European Cup Winners' Cup. Wrexham, one of the oldest surviving football teams in Britain, have won the Welsh Cup 23 times and reached the quarter-finals of the 1976 European Cup Winners' Cup. The New Saints have topped the Welsh Premier League a record thirteen times – including the past eight seasons.

The Welsh football league system has been headed since 1992 by the Cymru Premier. The second tier below the Cymru Premier is split between the Cymru North and the Cymru South. Below this is numerous regional leagues. The main Cup competitions in Wales are the Welsh Cup and the Welsh League Cup. However, for historical reasons, five Welsh clubs (Swansea City, Cardiff City, Newport County, Wrexham and Merthyr Town) play in the English football league system.

The Wales national football team have played in multiple major tournaments including the 1958 FIFA World Cup, UEFA Euro 2016, UEFA Euro 2020 and the 2022 FIFA World Cup.

=== Athletics ===
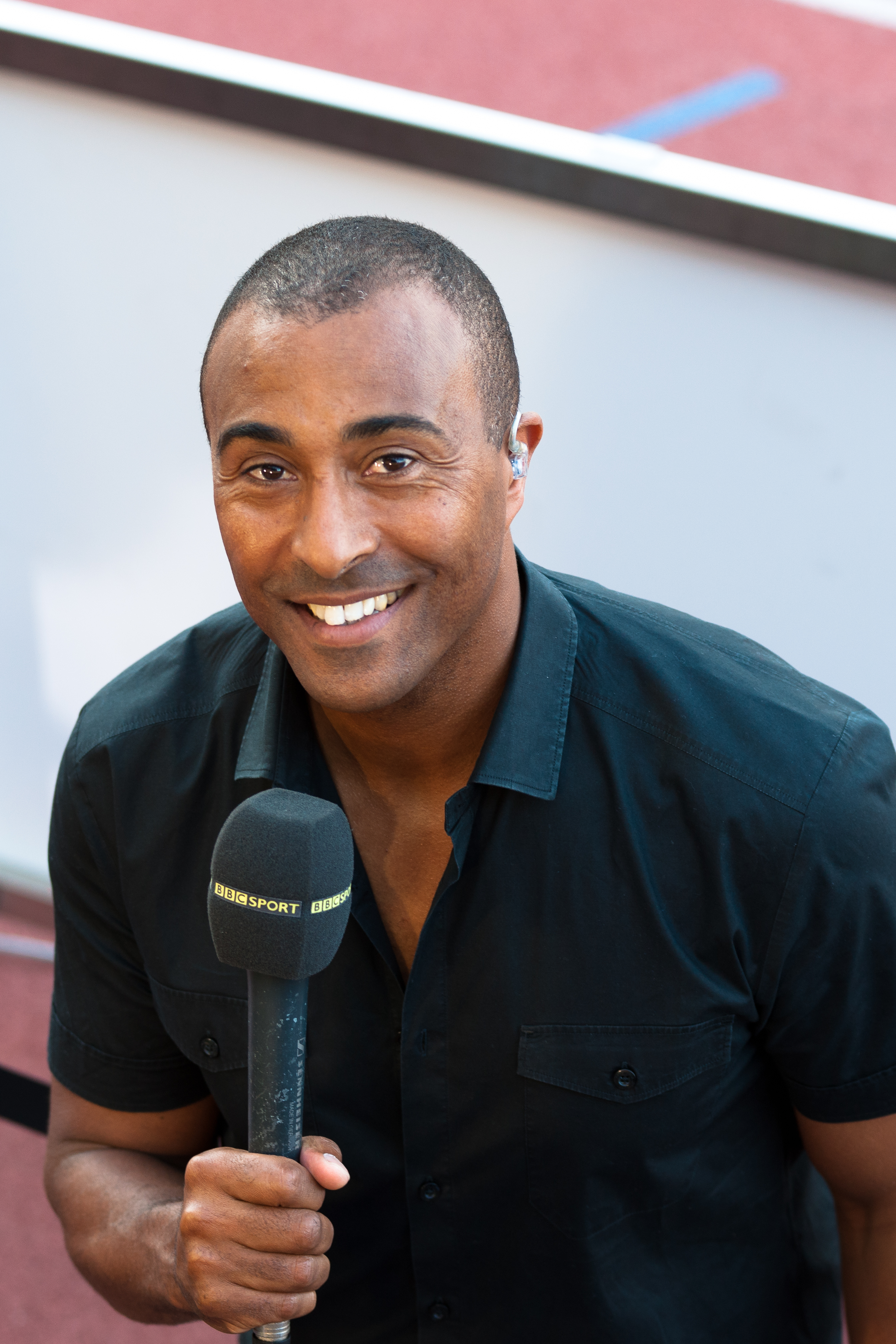
Colin Jackson in 2012

Wales has produced a number of athletes who have made a mark on the world stage, including the 110m hurdler Colin Jackson who is a former world record holder and the winner of numerous Olympic, World and European medals. Marathoner Steve Jones set the world record for the marathon in Chicago in 1984 with a time of 2:08:05. He also won a bronze medal at the Commonwealth games in the 10,000m in 1986.

The Isle of Anglesey is a member island of the International Island Games Association and compete as Ynys Môn. In the 2015 Island Games, held on Jersey, the Isle of Anglesey came 13th in the medal table with five gold and three bronze medals, won in sailing and athletics.

=== Snooker ===
Although little is known of the development of snooker (or billiards) in Wales, in the 20th century it became a popular pastime in working men's clubs. One of the first Welsh stars of the sport was amateur Horace Coles, who was runner up to Allan Prior in the 1927 World Billiard Championships. Coles reached the final again in 1935, this time victorious over McGhie of Scotland to take the World title. Players of note after the Second World War included Roy Oriel of Mountain Ash and Clive Everton, who is now most recognised as a snooker commentator and journalist.

The popularisation of colour television in the 1970s, brought the game of snooker to a new demographic of viewers. The decade was dominated by Ray Reardon from Tredegar, who won six World Snooker Championship titles, and when the first world rankings were introduced in 1976, Reardon became the first world number one snooker player. Some of Reardon's contemporaries included Gary Owen from Tumble and Cliff Wilson also from Tredegar.

Wales has continued to produce world-class snooker players since Reardon's time, including Terry Griffiths, Mark Williams and Matthew Stevens. Amateur participation in the sport is very high.

=== Cycling ===
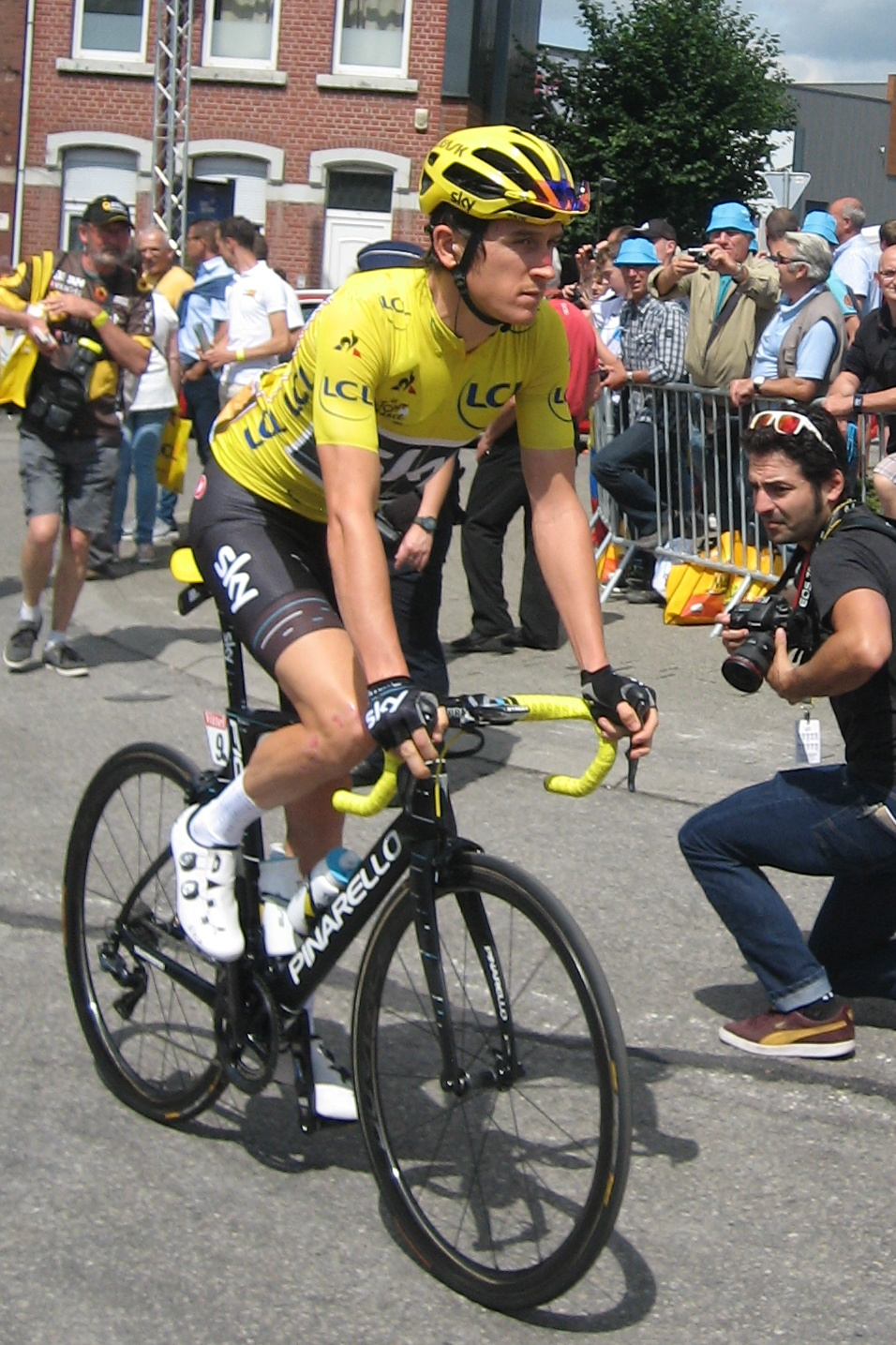
Geraint Thomas, winner of Tour de France

Cycling has been a popular sport in Wales since the Victorian period. Two of the first stars of British racing both came from Aberaman, Jimmy Michael and Arthur Linton. The Wales National Velodrome is located in Newport and Wales has continued to produce a number of successful international cyclists throughout the modern era including Olympic champions Nicole Cooke and Geraint Thomas.

On 29 July 2018 Thomas went on to become the first Welshman to win the Tour de France. Cooke had previously won the women's equivalent, the Grande Boucle Féminine Internationale, in 2006 and 2007.

=== Boxing ===
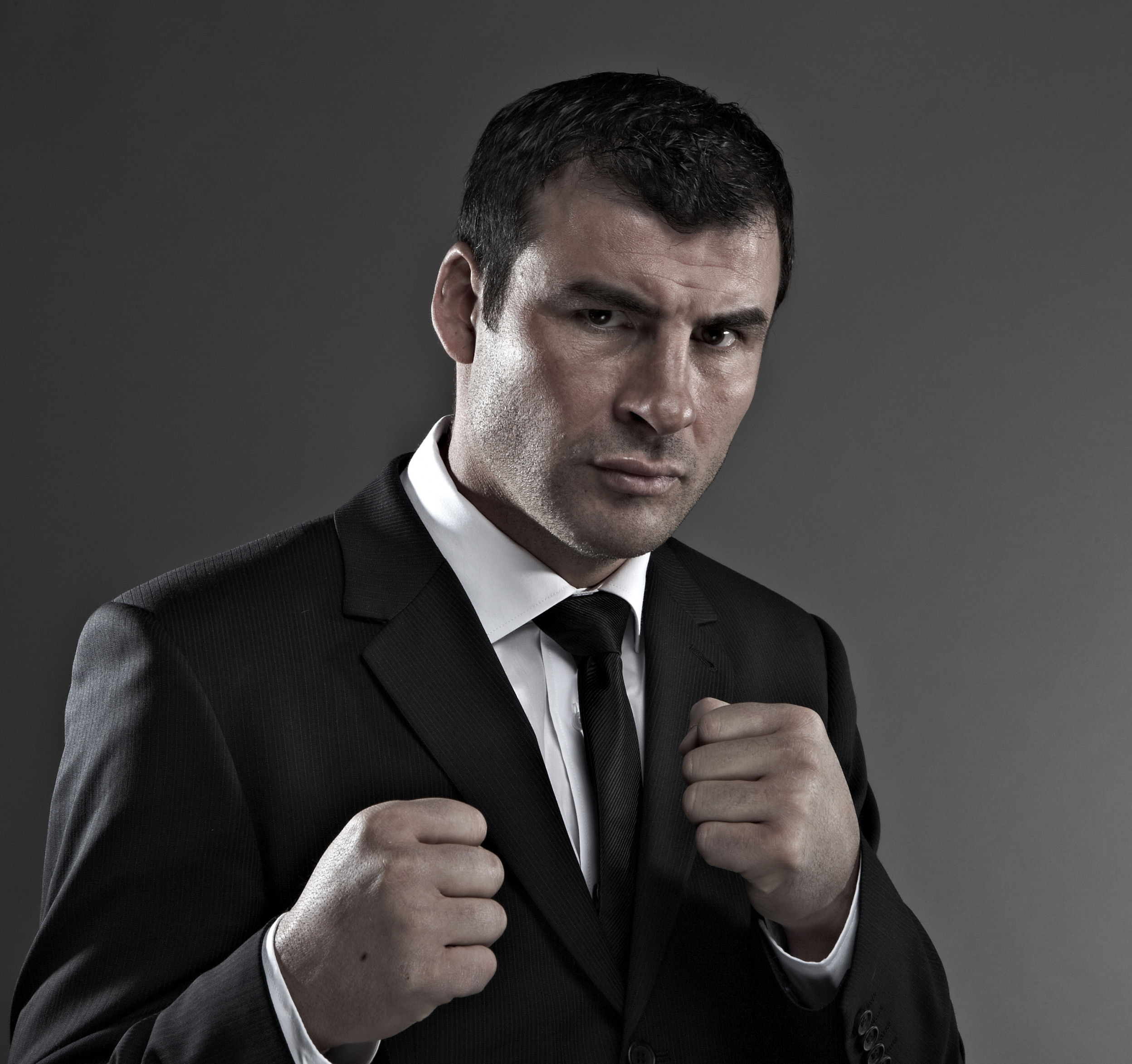
Boxer, Joe Calzaghe

Wales has a strong connection with the sport of boxing, particularly in the South Wales Valleys, with fighters such as Tommy Farr, Freddie Welsh, Jimmy Wilde, Dai Dower and Johnny Owen all competing at the highest level. Joe Calzaghe, born to a Welsh mother and Italian father and raised in Newbridge, retired in 2009 as an unbeaten world champion. Other former world champions include Enzo Maccarinelli, Gavin Rees, Howard Winstone, Jim Driscoll, Steve Robinson and Robbie Regan.

=== Welsh baseball ===
Welsh baseball (Welsh: Pêl Fas Gymreig) or British baseball, is a bat-and-ball game played in south Wales and formerly in parts of England. It is closely related to the game of rounders, and emerged as a distinct sport when governing bodies in Wales and England agreed to change the name of the game from "rounders" when the rules were codified in 1892. The sport was at its peak in Wales in the 1930s and 1950s, and is most popular in the cities of Cardiff and Newport. As a traditional bat-and-ball game, its roots go back much further, and literary references to baseball and rounders date back many centuries, the earliest mentions "base ball" being played in Britain in 1744.

Having once been able to attract crowds of 20,000, Welsh Baseball is now an exclusively amateur sport. The international fixture between England and Wales was cancelled in 2015 following the sport's rapid decline in England.

=== Cricket ===
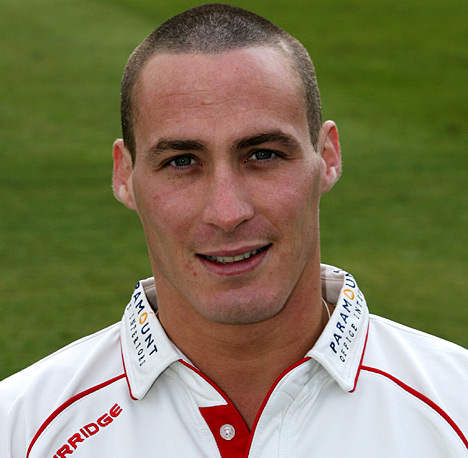
International cricketer Simon Jones

In cricket, England and Wales field a single representative team in international competition which is administered by the England and Wales Cricket Board (ECB). There is a separate Wales cricket team that occasionally participates in limited-overs domestic competition. A Wales team also plays in the English Minor Counties competition.

Cricket is one of the most popular summer sports within Wales.

Glamorgan County Cricket Club is the only Welsh participant in the England and Wales County Championship.

=== Darts ===
Darts is a popular amateur sport in Wales, widely associated with public houses and working men's clubs. The sport first gained widespread popularity in the 1920s and 1930s, being a relatively cheap hobby that could be enjoyed with friends socially. During this period pub cup competitions and league teams began to form in the country. During the 1970s and 1980s, a period in Britain when darts was an extremely popular television sport, Wales provided popular professional players such as Ceri Morgan, Leighton Rees and Alan Evans. Rees won the World Darts Championship in 1978, a feat repeated by Richie Burnett in 1995 and Mark Webster in 2008. Since 1988 Wales hosts its own Open championship.

=== Golf ===
Although a sport most associated with Scotland, golf has a tradition in Wales stretching back to the late 19th century. The first recognised golf courses were constructed in Wales in the 1880s, though a short course was built in Pontnewydd in Cwmbran in 1875. Most of these early courses were built on coastal common land, including Tenby (1880), Borth and Ynyslas (1885). As tourism developed in Wales, the golf clubs helped attract visitors, which was further advertised by the newly constructed passenger rail links.

The first amateur golf championship was held at Aberdovey in 1895, and nine years later the first professional championship was at Radyr in Cardiff. In Wales, golf was open to both men and women from its earliest beginnings, with the Welsh Ladies' Golf Union founded in 1904. Despite the openness of the sport to both sexes, it was still considered elitist by many in Wales, and essentially an English pastime.

As living standards improved during the 20th century, golf began to lose its elitist label, and was embraced by all sections of society. Dai Rees was one of the first successful Welsh golfers, captaining a winning British and Irish Ryder Cup team in 1957. Wales has won the golfing World Cup on two occasions, with the pairing of David Llewellyn and Ian Woosnam lifting the trophy in Hawaii in 1987, and again in 2005, with Stephen Dodd and Bradley Dredge winning in Portugal. Woosnam then followed countryman Rees' achievement when he led Europe to victory against the USA in the 2006 Ryder Cup.

Seven Welshmen have appeared at the European Ryder Cup team: Rees, Woosnam, Bert Hodson, Brian Huggett, Dave Thomas, Phillip Price and Jamie Donaldson. Meanwhile, Becky Brewerton has played at the Solheim Cup.

The Celtic Manor Resort in Newport, South Wales was the venue for the 2010 Ryder Cup; the first time the event was held in Wales. Europe beat the USA by 14.5 points to 13.5 in one of the most dramatic finishes to the tournament in recent years. The event also made history by becoming the first Ryder Cup to stretch over four days, following heavy rain throughout the weekend.

=== Horseracing ===
Organised horse racing in Wales originated with the gentry and aristocracy, but by 1833 there were internationally recognised flat races at many locations around the country, including Cowbridge, Brecon and Wrexham. Steeplechasing began at Bangor-on-Dee in the 1850s, and is still a racecourse to this day. The 20th century saw the Welsh working class embrace the sport, mainly due to the spread of off-course betting. 1926 saw the opening of Chepstow Racecourse which presently holds the Welsh National. Today only three racecourses survive in Wales, Chepstow, Bangor-Is-Coed and Ffos Las which was opened in 2009.

Wales has produced several jockeys of note, including Jack Anthony who won the Grand National on three occasions (1911, 1915 and 1920), Hywel Davies who won it in 1985 and Carl Llewellyn who won the race most recently in 1992 and again in 1998. Another notable Welsh jockey was Dick Francis, who was British jump racing Champion Jockey in the 1953–54 season and was famous for riding Devon Loch when the horse slipped close to the winning post when leading 1956 Grand National. In retirement Francis became a best-selling author of crime novels set in the racing world.

A popular, if unusual, form of horseracing in Wales is harness racing, known in Wales as 'trotting'. The oldest trotting meet in Wales is the Llangadog which has been held every Easter Monday since 1884. In 1990, 'Tir Prince' an American-style raceway was opened in Towyn which now holds 13 races a year, many of which are shown on Welsh language television channel S4C on its programme Rasus.

=== Basketball ===
Basketball has a long affiliation in Wales with Basketball Wales, the National Governing Body of the sport, becoming members of FIBA in 1952. The federation runs two main leagues, split into Southern and Northern leagues, while the country is represented at international level by the Wales national basketball team.

In 1978, Wales co-hosted the inaugural Commonwealth Basketball Championships (Senior Men only) with Scotland and England. Coached by Andy Henderson and Paul Kinninmont, with Ralph Wills as Team Manager, the team played its pool matches at The National Sports Centre, Sophia Gardens. On completion of the first round, the team travelled to Coventry to complete the tournament.

In 2012 Basketball Wales was part of the Great Britain men's team that played at the 2012 Summer Olympics in London, but after no Welsh players were selected for the team they decided to leave the Great Britain team to allow their players greater international exposure.

=== Lacrosse ===
The sport of lacrosse in Great Britain gained popularity when Queen Victoria championed the sport as suitable for girls in public schools. The sport was embraced in Wales, and an international women's team was representing the country by the 1920s. In the 1930s the Welsh Lacrosse Association was formed, but an attempt to form a men's national team in the 1940s failed to establish. A men's team was successfully founded in 1991, and in the first European Lacrosse Championships the team finished third, their best result. The women's team has been far more successful, and have never been out of the top three in the women's European Lacrosse Championships, winning the competition 1999, 2004 and 2008. They are the current European champions.

=== Motor sports ===
The rugged terrain of the country also gives plenty of opportunities for rally driving and Wales currently hosts the Wales Rally GB, the finale of the World Rally Championship. Wales has had some notability in the World Rally Championship, producing two championship winning Co-Drivers, those being Nicky Grist, who helped Juha Kankkunen to win the 1993 title, as well as winning 17 rallies with Colin McRae, and Phil Mills who helped Petter Solberg win the 2003 title. More recently Elfyn Evans became a full-time WRC driver in 2014, having won the Junior British Rally Championship in 2010 and the WRC Academy Cup in 2012. He scored two podium finishes in the 2015 season, including a best result of second at the Tour de Corse.

Two Welsh drivers have competed in the Formula One championship: the first was Alan Rees at the 1967 British Grand Prix, who finished in ninth position, four laps behind the winner, Jim Clark. Rees was subsequently involved in the management side of motorsport for many years, co-founding March Engineering and the Arrows team as well as working for Shadow Racing Cars. Tom Pryce was the more notable of the two drivers, as he finished on the podium twice and, at the 1975 British Grand Prix, qualified in pole position. Pryce's career was cut short at the 1977 South African Grand Prix after he collided with volunteer marshal, Jansen Van Vuuren, killing both instantly.

Freddie Williams was world speedway champion in 1950 and 1953, and the British Grand Prix – the United Kingdom's round of the world championship – is held each year at the Millennium Stadium in Cardiff. For many years Newport Wasps ran a team in the British speedway leagues as did Carmarthen.

Wales has also produced several champions in autograss, a form of motor racing on grass or dirt tracks.

== Olympic sports ==
Wales has produced many notable Olympic and Paralympic athletes for the Great Britain team.

In 1907, the IOC ruled "country" is a "territory" having "separate representation on the international olympic committee", therefore outruled a separate Welsh delegation. In the 1908 Olympics, Wales were allowed to enter a Welsh national team for field hockey and won third place. In all other events and olympics since then, Welsh athletes have competed as members of a UK team.

Wales' Paralympic athletes won 27 medals in the 2004 Summer Paralympics (12 gold, six silver, nine bronze) and achieved 14 medals at 2008 Summer Paralympics (ten gold, three silvers, one bronze). Two notable Welsh Paralympians to represent Great Britain were Tanni Grey-Thompson, winner of 11 gold medals over four Paralympics and swimmer Dave Roberts who took 11 gold medals over three Paralympics.

Other Olympians of note include, Beijing 2008 Olympic Gold medalist and international champion cyclist Nicole Cooke (Road Race), who also won the 2006 and 2007 Grande Boucle – the women's Tour de France, and Geraint Thomas who won Gold (Team Pursuit) at the Beijing 2008 Olympics. He has also rode the Tour de France in 2007, 2010, 2011, 2013,2014 and 2015. Another cyclist Simon Richardson – double gold medallist at the 2008 Summer Paralympics (1 km and 3 km time trial). Swimmer David Davies was a Silver Medalist (10 km marathon) and Athens 2004 Olympic Bronze Medalist (1500 m freestyle).

Cardiff provided training facilities for some visiting teams of the 2012 Summer Olympics. The Millennium Stadium also hosted games in both the men's and women's football events.

=== Calls for Wales Olympic team ===
Two Plaid Cymru politicians, as well as other individuals and pro-independence group YesCymru have called for a Wales Olympic team separate from Team GB which represents the United Kingdom, citing the Faroe Islands and Puerto Rico as examples for non-sovereign states competing at the Olympic Games or as a proposal of the Welsh independence movement. There have been instances where Welsh symbols were not allowed at the Olympics as part of Team GB, receiving criticism from some Welsh people. Supporters state their wish to represent Wales rather than Great Britain at the Olympics, giving more opportunities to Welsh athletes without the competition on a British team, sing the Welsh national anthem rather than the "English national anthem" and fly the Welsh flag. Although some supporters state it may not be probable unless Wales gains independence and Wales may lose medals in group events where Team GB is more successful. Opponents argue that Wales' athletes "thrive" as part of Team GB with the National Lottery providing £21 million for Welsh sport in 2021/22, that athletes achieve more when working together and that individuals can be Welsh and British. If Wales' medals at the 2020 Summer Olympics were classed separately, it would've ranked 24th, although the athletes were part of Team GB's Olympic programme in the event.

== Other sports ==
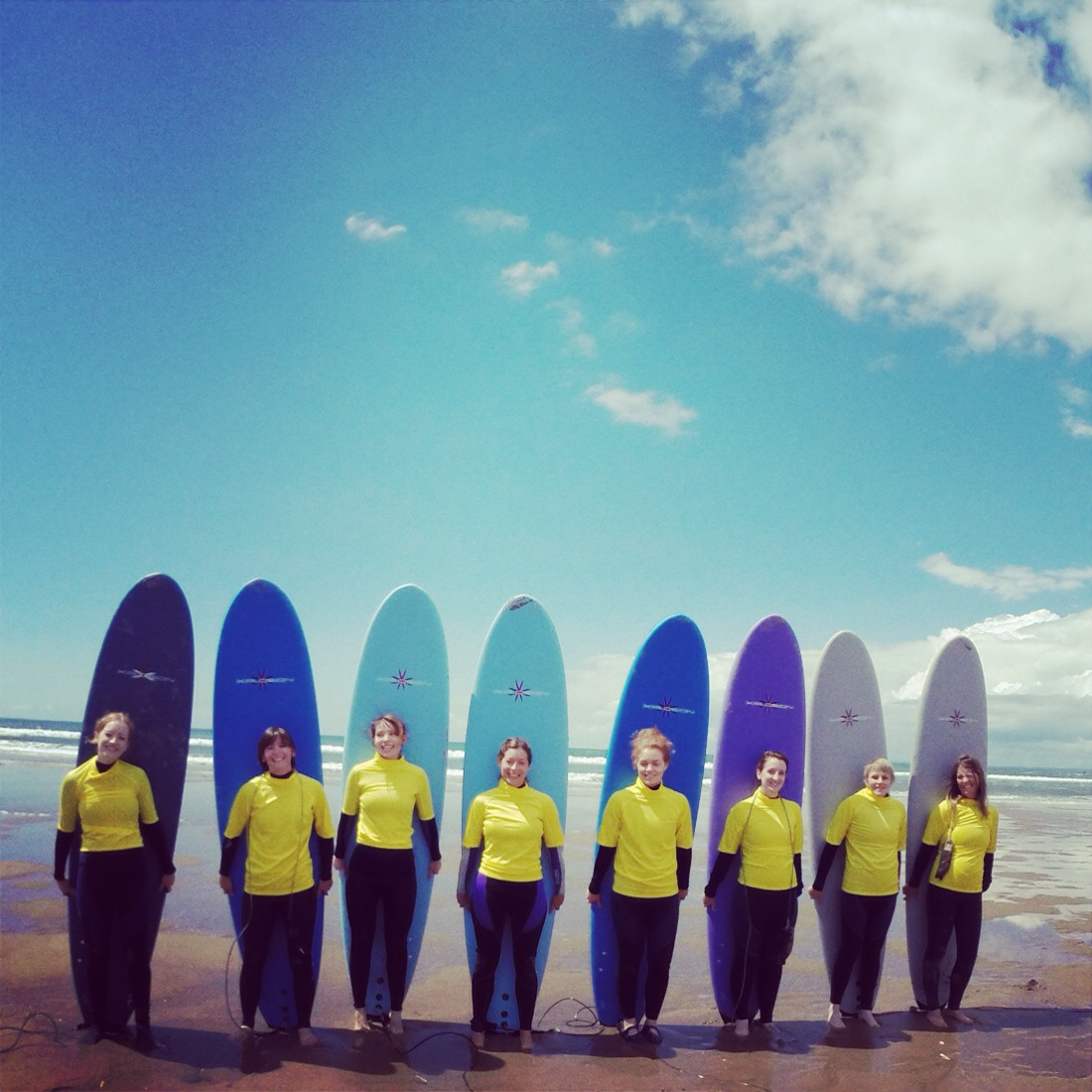
Surfers at Llangennith, Gower, South Wales. Photo: RIPNROCK

The Cardiff Devils play in the Elite Ice Hockey League, the highest level of ice hockey competition in the United Kingdom.

Australian rules football is a growing sport with several clubs starting up in the mid-2000s. Wales has a national team the Wales Australian rules football team, they are the holders of the Dragon Cup after beating England 179–93 on aggregate on 18 and 25 October 2008. Wales also competes as part of the Great Britain Australian rules football team in the Australian Football International Cup, which is essentially a World Cup for all countries apart from Australia which is the only place where the sport is played professionally.

The Tiger Bay Brawlers are a roller derby league based in Cardiff, Wales. Founded in April 2010, the league plays using the Women's Flat Track Derby Association rules set.

The South Wales Warriors are a British American football team based in Llanharan, Mid Glamorgan, Wales. The team was formed in 2001 after the Tiger Bay Warriors had disbanded due to the departure of head coach Rob Mota, along with key staff and players, by the remaining players and staff, using equipment, resources and shirts from the folded Tiger Bay Warriors for economical purposes.

Gliding and paragliding are popular in Wales, South Wales Gliding Club, Black Mountains G.C, North Wales Gliding Club, Denbigh Gliding.

Wales is also popular for surfing.

== National teams ==
| Sport | National Team | Association |
|---|---|---|
| Badminton | (M & W) | Badminton Wales |
| Basketball | (M, W) | Basketball Wales |
| Cricket | (M, W) | Cricket Wales |
| Field hockey | (M, W) | Hockey Wales |
| Football | (M, W) | Football Association of Wales |
| Korfball | (M & W) | Welsh Korfball Association |
| Netball | (W) | Wales Netball |
| Rugby league | (M) | Wales Rugby League |
| Rugby sevens | (M, W) | Welsh Rugby Union |
| Rugby union | (M, W) | Welsh Rugby Union |
| Squash | (M) | Squash Wales |
| Volleyball | (M) | Welsh Volleyball Association |

== Affiliation with an international federation of an Olympic sport ==
A requirement of olympic representation includes at least five national federations associated with an international federation of an olympic sport.

The following are members of an olympic recognised federation:

- Badminton Wales – Badminton
- Welsh Amateur Boxing Association– Boxing
- Welsh Curling Association– Curling
- Football Association of Wales – Football
- Wales Golf – Golf
- Hockey Wales – Field hockey
- Welsh Rugby Union – Rugby sevens
- Table Tennis Wales – Table tennis
- Weightlifting Wales - Olympic weightlifting

=== Recognised olympic federations (not an olympic sport) ===
- Tenpin Bowling Association of Wales - Bowling
- Welsh Karate - Karate
- Wales Netball - Netball
- Squash Wales - Squash (sport)

== Student sport ==
Universities in Wales participate in British Universities and Colleges Sport (BUCS) as well as holding varsity matches and supporting the national development of elite athletes. The Cardiff International Pool and the Wales National Pool at Swansea University provide for a high level development of swimming.

== See also ==
- Australian rules football in Wales
- Cardiff International Sports Village
- Sport in Anglesey
- Sport in Cardiff
- Sport in the United Kingdom
- Sport in England
- Sport in Northern Ireland
- Sport in Scotland
- Sport Wales National Centre
- Welsh Varsity
- The Welsh Boat Race

== Bibliography ==
- Davies, John; Jenkins, Nigel (2008). The Welsh Academy Encyclopaedia of Wales. Cardiff: University of Wales Press. ISBN 978-0-7083-1953-6.
