= Welsh Cricket Association =

Governing body of amateur cricket in Wales

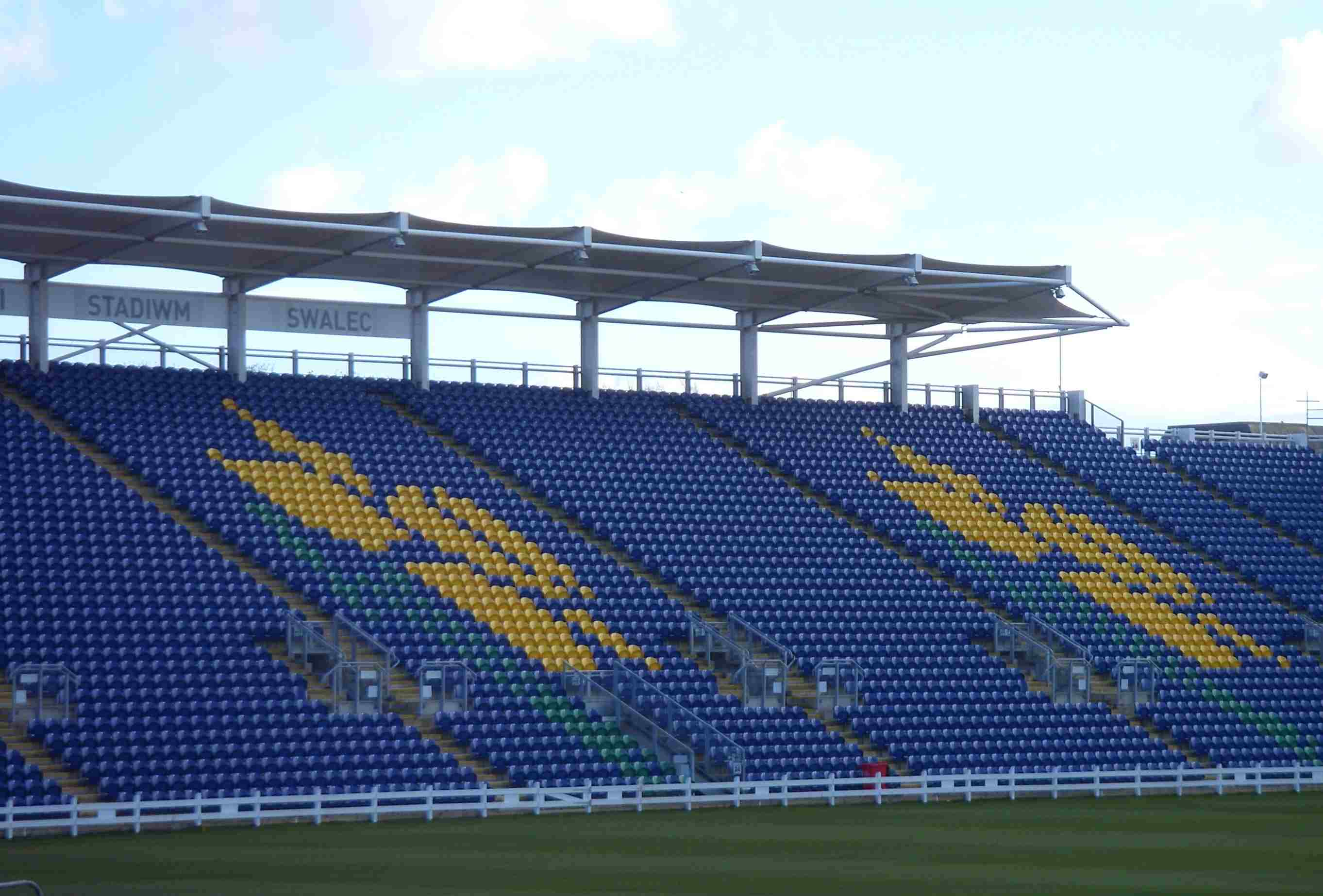
SWALEC Stadium, Cardiff, home of the Welsh Cricket Association

The Welsh Cricket Association (WCA) (founded 1969) was the governing body of Welsh amateur cricket. It also ran the Welsh Cup and convened the Welsh Coaching Forum. The WCA aimed to promote, encourage, and improve amateur cricket in Wales, and to encourage and develop active participation in the game. Over 270 counties, associations, leagues and clubs were affiliated to the WCA.

The Welsh Cricket Association was based at the SWALEC Stadium, Sophia Gardens, Cardiff.

== See also ==
- Cricket Wales
- Cricket in Wales
