= Welsh Target Shooting Federation =

Governing body for shooting sports in Wales

- Sport: Shooting sports
- Jurisdiction: National
- Abbreviation: WTSF
- Affiliation: Sport Wales, CSF
- Headquarters: Sport Wales National Centre, Cardiff
- Chairman: Martin Watkins
- Secretary: Paul Gumn

Official website
- wtsf.org.uk
- (Wales)

The Welsh Target Shooting Federation (Welsh: Ffederasiwn Saethu Targedau Cymru) (WTSF) is the governing body for shooting sports in Wales. The Federation is based within the Sport Wales National Centre in Sophia Gardens, Cardiff. The WTSF represents and supports its member bodies in promoting and developing shooting sports in Wales, engaging with Sport Wales, Team Wales, the Welsh Government, British Shooting and others.

== Members ==
The WSRA currently has five member bodies:

- Welsh Airgun Association (WAA)
- Welsh Airgun Field Target Association (WAFTA)
- Welsh Clay Target Shooting Association (WCTSA)
- Welsh Rifle Association (WRA)
- Welsh Small-bore Rifle Association (WSRA)

== Facilities ==
The WTSF is based from offices in the Sport Wales National Centre, which also hosts training facilities for smallbore rifle and airgun shooting. Clay Target shooters train at a variety of commercial and public grounds local to athletes including South Wales 2000, as well as overseas training camps. Fullbore Rifle shooters train largely at the National Shooting Centre, Bisley.

Access to the South Wales Police shooting range in Bridgend for members of the Smallbore Rifle and Pistol Squads, was arranged in January 2010. This followed negotiations between the Welsh Assembly Government and Sport Wales. Commonwealth Games and European Championship squad members were among those able to train at the site. Following success at the 2010 Commonwealth Games, shooting was upgraded to a Category A sport by Sport Wales and a 50-metre outdoor range for rimfire rifle, and a 10metre indoor range for air rifle and air pistol were constructed at Sport Wales for high performance training.

== Commonwealth Shooting Federation (European Division) Championships ==
Wales has hosted the CSF(ED) Championships five times since the inaugural CSF(ED) was held in Scotland in 1974. Wales hosted in 1976, 1983, 1989 and most recently in 2016 and 2022. Due to restrictive firearms laws imposed in 1997, the cartridge pistol events in 2016 and 2022 were held on Jersey. Due to a lack of suitable ranges in Wales, the fullbore rifle events were held at Bisley.
