= Sport Wales =

National sports organisation of Wales

- Chwaraeon Cymru (Welsh)
- Sport: Sport in Wales
- Jurisdiction: National
- Abbreviation: SCW (CCC)
- Founded: 4 February 1972; 54 years ago
- Headquarters: Sport Wales National Centre
- Location: Sophia Gardens, Cardiff
- President: John Hughes

Official website
- sport.wales
- (Wales)

The Sports Council for Wales, branded as simply Sport Wales (Welsh: Chwaraeon Cymru), is the national organisation responsible for developing and promoting sport and physical activity in Wales. Working alongside partners such as governing bodies of sport and local authorities, they aim to encourage sporting ambitions in the young and promote championship standards nationally.

They are the main adviser on sporting matters to the Welsh Government and are responsible for distributing National Lottery funds to both elite and grassroots sport in Wales.

It was established by Royal Charter on 4 February 1972.

== National centres ==
=== Sport Wales National Centre ===
The Sport Wales National Centre, located in Sophia Gardens, Cardiff, was established in 1972 to provide facilities to help develop Welsh sport. It is the national sports centre for Wales and is part of a network of facilities enabling Wales to compete in international sport.

The centre has indoor sports halls, next to Glamorgan CCC's SWALEC Stadium in Sophia Gardens. Sports activities in the Main Hall include gymnastics, table tennis, trampoline, badminton, netball, basketball, archery, martial arts, fencing, dance and boxing. The site also contains squash courts and weight training rooms. Outdoors, the Institute has an international standard permeable artificial pitch, which is one of the home international venues for Welsh hockey. The pitch is also used for lacrosse and football. Their outdoor tennis courts are also used for netball and five-a-side football.

Some of the country's national teams train at the Sport Wales National Centre, including the Wales National Rugby Team (on the Institute's full-size, floodlit rugby pitch), Wales National Badminton Team, the Wales national netball team and the Wales National Gymnastic Team. Owned and operated by Sport Wales, the Institute supports national governing bodies of sport and acts as a training base for elite athletes.

Several of the country's multi-sport agencies have their headquarters at the Sport Wales National Centre. Including the Welsh Sports Association the National Governing Bodies Coaches, the Federation of Disability Sport Wales and Sport Wales.

Governing bodies of sports in Wales with their headquarters at the Sport Wales National Centre include Basketball Wales, Welsh Judo Association, Welsh Gymnastics, Hockey Wales, Wales Rugby League and Squash Wales.

=== Plas Menai ===
Plas Menai, owned and run by Sport Wales, is the National Watersports Centre for Wales (Canolfan Cenedlaethol Chwaraeon Dŵr). A purpose-built watersports centre on the Menai Strait, Gwynedd, overlooking Anglesey, it was opened in 1986. Watersports courses are run at the centre, including canoeing, cruising (yachting), dinghy sailing, kayaking, powerboating and windsurfing.

The centre is also the headquarters of the Welsh Yachting Association (WYA; Cymdeithas Hwylio Cymru), the governing body for the sports of powerboating, sailing and windsurfing in Wales. The Welsh Yachting Association is jointly funded by Sport Wales and the Royal Yachting Association (RYA). Sailing clubs in Wales are members of the RYA and, as individuals must join the RYA to race, the WYA has no personal members. Its purpose is "... to feed the RYA GBR performance pathway, and ultimately Team GBR 2012 and beyond". Wales contributed 10 -15% to the Great Britain Olympic Sailing Squads in 2008.

== Other Facilities ==
Key national and regional facilities include the Welsh Rugby Union Centre of Excellence at the Vale Resort, the Wales National Football Development Centre, Wales National Velodrome in Newport and the National Whitewater Centre in Bala and regional centres abound across a number of sports. National Lottery funding has been invested into these facilities.

The 2012 Olympic Games was the most successful for any Welsh contingent in 100 years. More than 25% of the Great Britain Paralympic team's gold medals in 2008 came from Welsh sportsmen and women, who made up around 16% of the team. With help from the National Lottery, Sport Wales has invested in the Wales National Velodrome, Wales National Pool, and other national and regional centres across a number of sports such as athletics, swimming and golf, as well as a National Centre of Excellence for rugby which opened in 2009.
