= List of sports governing bodies in Wales =

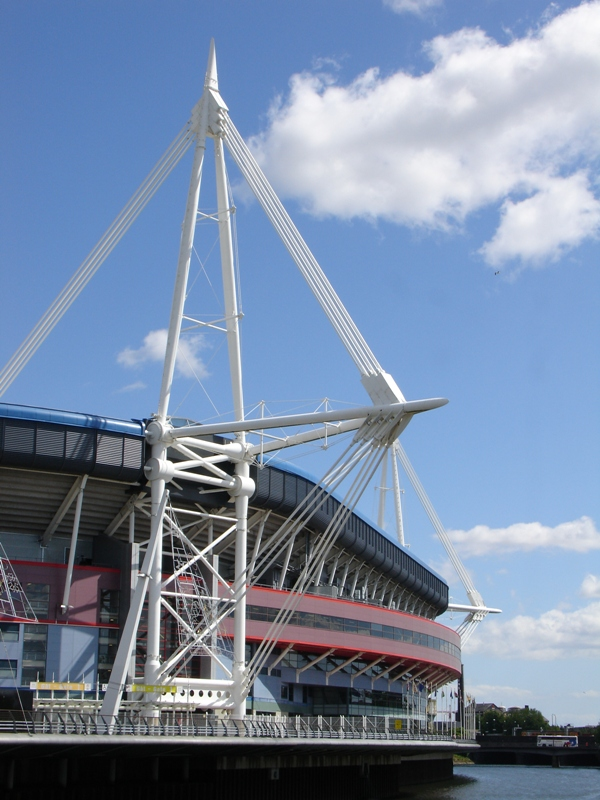
The Millennium Stadium, Cardiff (Welsh: Stadiwm y Mileniwm) owned by the Welsh Rugby Union the governing body of rugby in Wales

The governing bodies of sports in Wales perform an organisational, regulatory or sanctioning function at a national level in Wales, some tracing their history to the 19th Century. Many cooperate with similar bodies from other countries to agree rule changes for their sport. Most implement decisions made by the international bodies to which they belong. Some, such as the Welsh Sports Association, cover a range of sports. Most of the governing bodies involved in competitive sports select, organise and manage individuals or teams to represent their countries at international events or fixtures against other countries.

Sport Wales recognise over fifty governing bodies of sports in Wales, which represent their sports.

== Multi-sport bodies ==
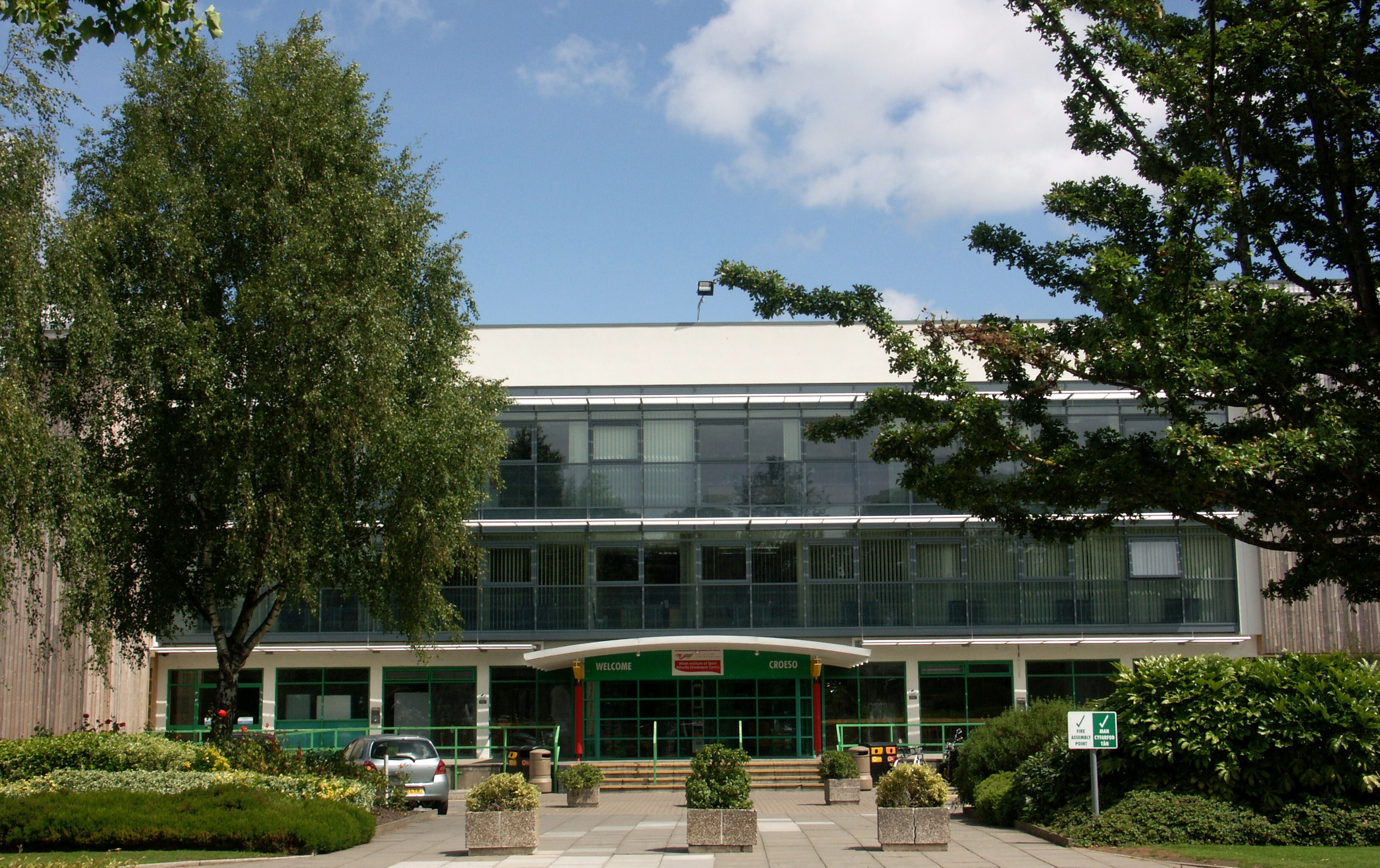
Sport Wales National Centre, Cardiff, headquarters of Federation of Disability Sport Wales, Sport Wales and the Welsh Sports Association

The Federation of Disability Sport Wales (Welsh: Chwaraeon Anabledd Cymru) is the national pan-disability governing body of sports organisations that provide local sporting and physical activity opportunities to disabled people in Wales. The Federation of Disability Sport Wales is based at the Sport Wales National Centre, Sophia Gardens, Cardiff.

Sport Wales (Chwaraeon Cymru) is responsible for developing and promoting sport and active lifestyles in Wales. It was established in 1927 with the objectives of "fostering the knowledge and practice of sport and physical recreation among the public at large in Wales and the provision of facilities thereto". Sport Wales is the Welsh Government's main adviser on sporting matters and is responsible for distributing National Lottery awards to sports in Wales. Sport Wales is based at the Sport Wales National Centre, Sophia Gardens, Cardiff.

The Welsh Sports Association (Gwasanaeth Chwaraeon Cymru) (WSA) (established 1972) is an independent, umbrella body, supporting and representing the national and international interests of all the national governing bodies (NGBs) of sport and physical recreation in Wales. It has a membership of over 60 NGBs. The WSA acts as an independent consultative body to the Welsh Government, Sport Wales and to UK Sport. The Welsh Sports Association is based at the Sport Wales National Centre, Sophia Gardens, Cardiff.

== Angling ==
The Federation of Welsh Anglers (FWA) is the umbrella body for the three national governing bodies for sea, coarse and game fishing in Wales—the Welsh Federation of Sea Anglers, the Welsh Federation of Coarse Anglers and the Welsh Salmon and Trout Angling Association. It is responsible for angling coaching development in Wales. The FWA is based in Hirwaun, Rhondda Cynon Taf.

The Welsh Federation of Coarse Anglers (WFCA) is the governing body for coarse angling in Wales. It was established in 1977 and by 2003 had 69 affiliated clubs and over 23,000 members. The WFCA is based at Briton Ferry, Neath Port Talbot.

The Welsh Federation of Sea Anglers (WFSA) (established 1955) is the governing body of sea angling in Wales. The WFSA organise major angling events at regional and national levels. The WFSA fights for member clubs' access to, and fishing from, threatened facilities, as well as organising the election of individuals and teams to represent Wales at international sea angling competitions. The Welsh Federation of Sea Anglers is based in Bargoed, Caerphilly County Borough.

The Welsh Salmon and Trout Angling Association (Cymdeithas Genweirwyr Eog a Brithyll Cymru) (WSTAA) is the governing body for game angling in Wales and has about one hundred member clubs. Founded as the Welsh Fly Fishing Association (Welsh: Cymdeithas Pysgota Pluen Cymru) in 1952, the WSTAA organise national and international angling competitions, including two major World Fly Fishing Championships and the 2002 Commonwealth championship in Wales—The WSTAA Wales team won gold at the 2009 IFFA River International competition. The WSTAA also highlights issues that affect Welsh anglers including: game fishing conservation; threats to water quality from acid rain; water pollution; barrages; poaching; stocking; and Objective One funding. The Welsh Salmon and Trout Angling Association is based in Waunfawr, Aberystwyth, Ceredigion.

== Archery ==
The Welsh Archery Association (WAA) is the governing body for archery in Wales. It was established in 2000 by the merger of the South Wales Archery Society (formed 1951), the North Wales Archery Society (formed 1953) and the Welsh Archery Federation (formed 1970s), and by 2002 had 51 affiliated clubs and over 800 members. Responsibilities of the WAA include the competition, judging and coaching of archery in Wales. The WAA also control the selection and management of representative teams competing for Wales at international events. The Welsh Archery Association is based in Barry, Vale of Glamorgan.

== Athletics ==
Welsh Athletics (Athletau Cymru) (WA) is the national governing body for athletics.

Set up as a limited company in 2007 to replace the former Athletic Association of Wales, Welsh Athletics has more than 70 affiliated clubs, with over 7,000 athletes taking part in WA competitions.

Welsh Athletics has been based at the Cardiff International Sports Stadium, Leckwith, since 2009, having been based at the Cardiff Athletics Stadium until the stadium was demolished in 2007.

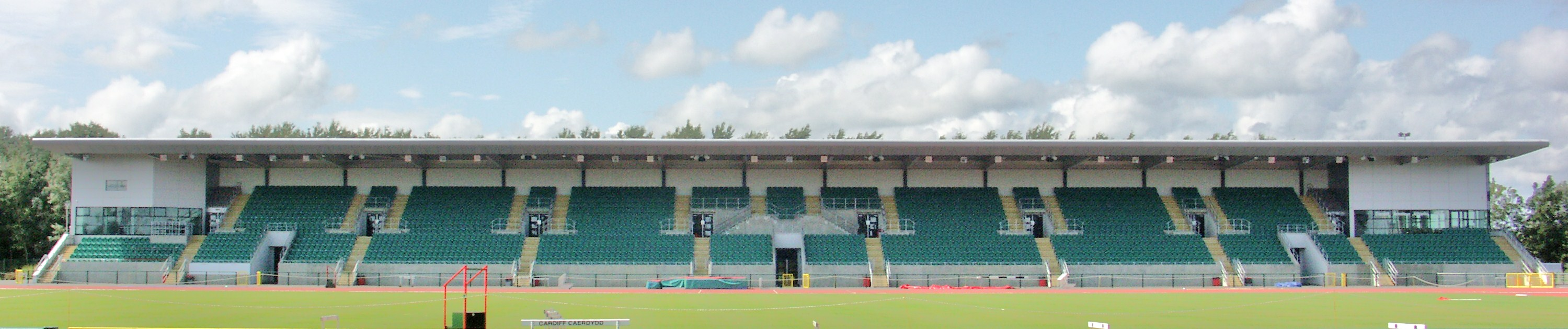
Cardiff International Sports Stadium, home of Welsh Athletics

== Badminton ==
Welsh Badminton Cymru (WBC) is the governing body for badminton in Wales. Formed in 1928 as The Welsh Badminton Union, in 1934 it was one of the founder members of the Badminton World Federation. It became a member of the European Badminton Union in 1968 (now Badminton Europe). Over 90 senior clubs are affiliated to Welsh Badminton Cymru, and its membership is nearly 4000.].

Wales competes in the European Championships, World Championships, Commonwealth Games and the Thomas and Uber Cup World Team Championships. WBC organises national and international competitions, including the Welsh National Badminton Championships and the Welsh International Badminton Championships, and manages the Wales representative squads internationally, at all levels.

Welsh Badminton Cymru is based at the Sport Wales National Centre, Sophia Gardens, Cardiff.

== Baseball ==
Welsh Baseball Union (WBU), formed in 1892, is the governing body of men's British baseball in Wales. It is based in Heath, Cardiff.

Welsh Ladies Baseball Union (WLBU) is the governing body of women's British baseball in Wales. It was formed in 2006 when the WLBU decided to break away from the men's WBU. The WLBU are based in Grangetown, Cardiff.

== Basketball ==
Basketball Wales (Pêl-fasged Cymru) is the sole controller and the governing body of all aspects of the game of basketball in Wales. It is responsible for the management of the Welsh National Basketball League, the national teams and for the organisation of all national and international basketball competitions held in Wales.

Basketball Wales is based at the Sport Wales National Centre, Sophia Gardens, Cardiff.

== Bowls ==
The Welsh Bowls Federation (WBF) (established 2001) is an umbrella partnership body comprising representatives from the five national governing bodies: the Welsh Bowling Association; the Welsh Indoor Bowls Association; the Welsh Ladies Indoor Bowling Association; the Welsh Short Mat Bowls Association; and the Welsh Women's Bowling Association. The Welsh Bowls Coaching Association and Welsh Bowls Umpires Association are also represented. The WBF has 670 affiliated clubs and over 25,000 members. The Welsh Bowls Federation is based at Whitland, Carmarthenshire.

The Welsh Bowling Association (WBA) is the governing body for men's outdoor bowling clubs in Wales. It has 10 affiliated counties and 286 affiliated clubs. The WBA organise competitions, including the county championship, and select and manage the national side. At the 2009 Atlantic Rim Championship in Johannesburg, the Welsh men's team finished third. The Welsh Bowling Association is based at Llanishen, Cardiff.

The Welsh Crown Green Bowling Association (WCGBA) is the governing body for crown green bowling in Wales. The WCGBA organise competitions, including the Welsh Club Championship, and select and manage the national side.

The Welsh Indoor Bowls Association (WIBA) is the governing body for the indoor bowling clubs in Wales. It has 24 affiliated clubs. The WBA organise competitions, including the WIBA Club Championship, and select and manage the national side. The Welsh Bowling Association is based at Gorseinon, Swansea.

The Welsh Ladies Indoor Bowling Association (WLIBA) (formed 1950) is the governing body for the indoor bowling clubs in Wales. It has 25 affiliated clubs. The WLIBA organise national competitions and select and manage the national side. The Welsh Ladies Indoor Bowling Association is based at Ton Pentre, Rhondda Cynon Taf.

The Welsh Short Mat Bowls Association (Cymdeithas Bowlio Mat Byr Cymru) (WSMBA) is the governing body for short mat bowling clubs in Wales. The WSMBA organise national competitions, including league and inter-county, and select and manage the national side.

The Welsh Women's Bowling Association (WWBA) (founded in 1932 as Welsh Ladies Bowls Association) is the governing body for women's outdoor bowling clubs in Wales. It has eight affiliated counties and 160 affiliated clubs. The WBA organise competitions, including the county championship, and select and manage the national side. At the 2009 Atlantic Rim Championship in Johannesburg, the Welsh women's team finished first. The Welsh Women's Bowling Association is based at Knighton, Powys.

== Canoeing ==
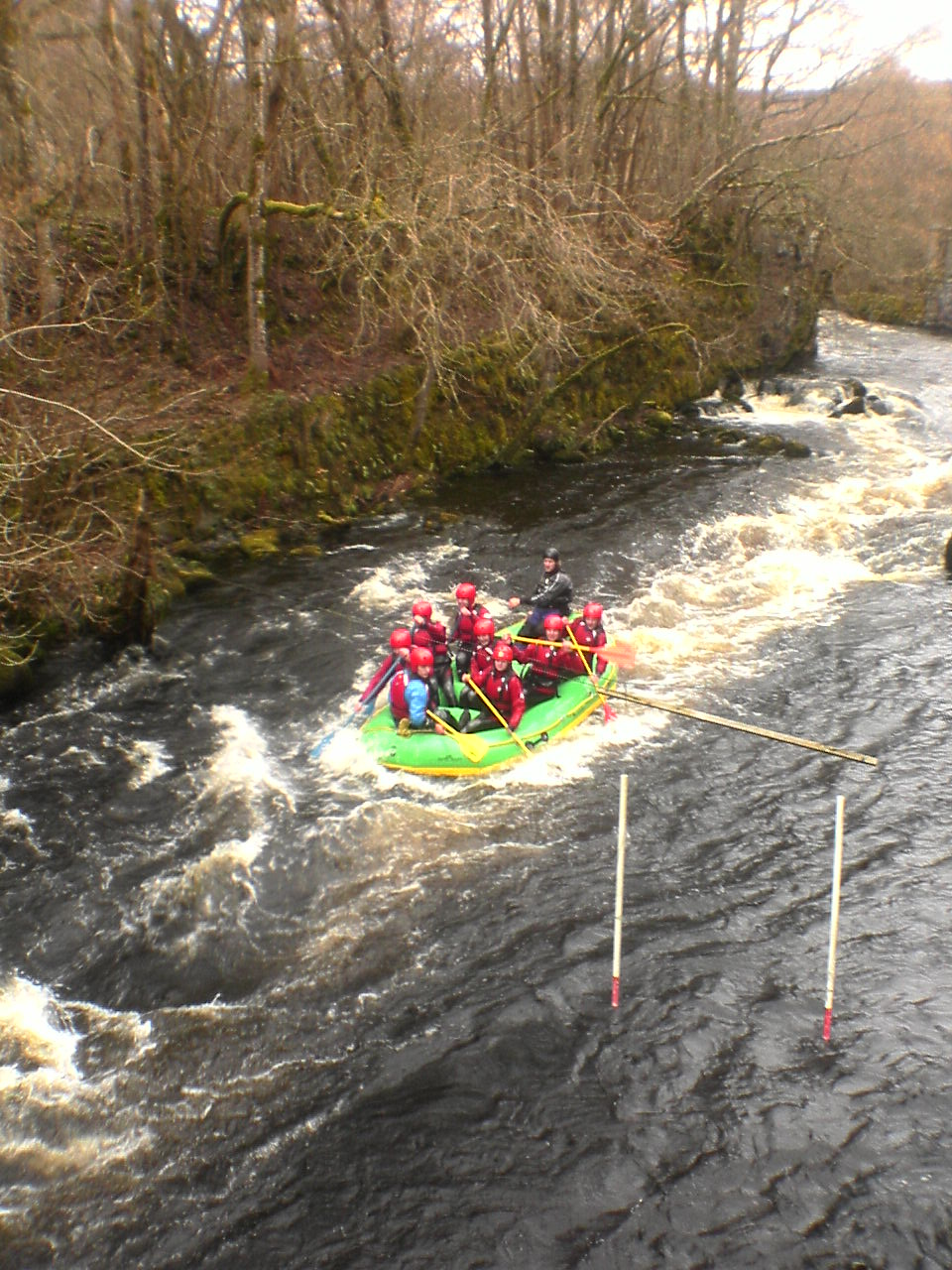
Rafting at Canolfan Tryweryn

Canoe Wales-Canw Cymru (formed as the Welsh Canoeing Association) is the governing body for canoeing and kayaking in Wales. It has over 50 affiliated clubs and a membership of 1800. Canoe Wales-Canw Cymru is responsible for the formal access agreements on the Conwy, Glaslyn, Llwyd, Ogwr, Severn, Tawe, Tryweryn, Twrch, Usk and Wye and informal agreements on rivers and managed stillwaters. It is also responsible for the rights of navigation agreements on sections of the Lugg, Severn and Wye. Canoe Wales-Canw Cymru organises competition at national and international level in all the canoeing and kayaking disciplines in Wales: freestyle; slalom; wild water racing; marathon racing; sprint racing; surf kayaking; and canoe polo.

Canoe Wales-Canw Cymru manages Canolfan Tryweryn, the National Whitewater Centre near Bala, Gwynedd, where Canoe Wales-Canw Cymru is based. The Afon Tryweryn is a dam released river, allowing water to flow when other rivers are running dry, providing a year-round white water venue.

== Caving ==
The Cambrian Caving Council (CCC) (formed 1969) is the national association for caving, representing the interests of caving clubs in Wales. It is a member of several organisations including the Brecon Beacons National Park Access & Recreation Advisory Group, the Countryside Council for Wales, the Gower Cave Advisory Group, the Gwenlais Valley Consortium (Carmel Woods), the Pembrokeshire Outdoor Charter, the Welsh Exploration Society and the Welsh Sports Association. The CCC also maintains contact with several other regional and national bodies including, the Natural Resources Wales, Forestry Enterprise, various bat groups, Welsh Water and Sport Wales, as well as with the other Regional Caving Councils.

== Cricket ==
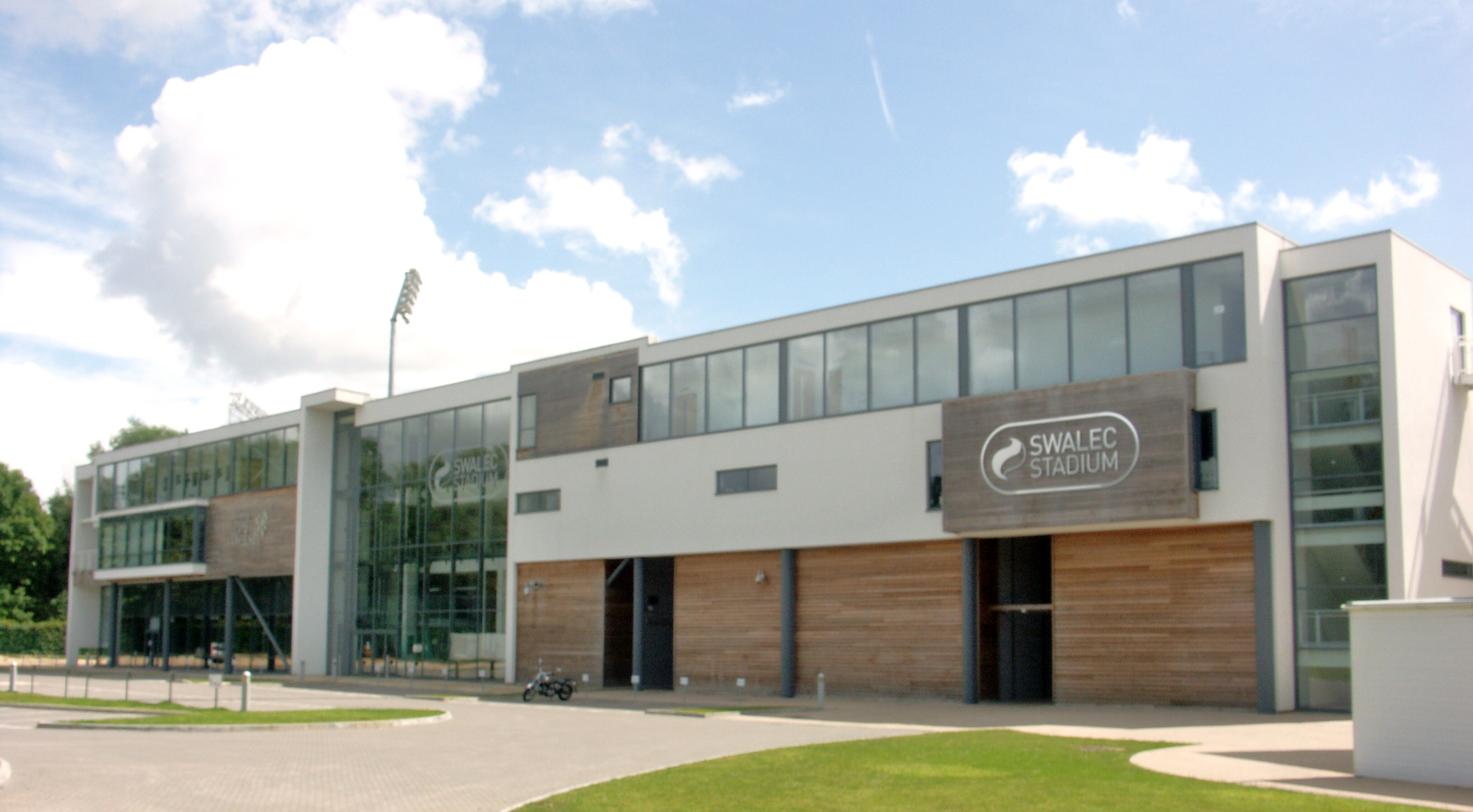
Entrance to the SWALEC Stadium home of Welsh cricket

Cricket Wales (Criced Cymru) is an umbrella partnership body comprising the Welsh Cricket Association, Glamorgan Cricket, Wales National County, the Welsh Schools Cricket Association and Sport Wales. It regulates the sport of cricket in Wales and organises competitions up to national level. Cricket Wales is based at the SWALEC Stadium, Sophia Gardens, Cardiff.

Glamorgan Cricket (Criced Morgannwg) is the Welsh first class, professional club. Glamorgan CCC play in the England and Wales Cricket Board County Championship. The club has over 7000 members. It also runs the Welsh Cricket Academy. Glamorgan Cricket is based at the SWALEC Stadium, Sophia Gardens, Cardiff.

Wales National County Cricket Club runs the Welsh team in the National Counties Cricket Championship.

The Welsh Asians Cricket Club is based in Grangetown, Cardiff.

The Welsh Cricket Academy (Academi Criced Cymru) is run by Glamorgan Cricket, based at the SWALEC Stadium, Sophia Gardens, Cardiff.

The Welsh Cricket Association (Cymdeithas Criced Cymru) (WCA) (founded 1969) is the governing body of Welsh amateur cricket. It also runs the Welsh Cup and convenes the Welsh Coaching Forum. The WCA aims to promote, encourage, and improve amateur cricket in Wales, and to encourage and develop active participation in the game. Over 270 counties, associations, leagues and clubs are affiliated to the WCA. The Welsh Cricket Association is based at the SWALEC Stadium, Sophia Gardens, Cardiff.

The Welsh Clubs Cricket Conference is based in Llanishen, Cardiff.

The Welsh Schools' Cricket Association run inter schools competitions in Wales. It is based in Fishguard, Pembrokeshire.

Welsh Women's Cricket is based in Builth Wells, Powys.

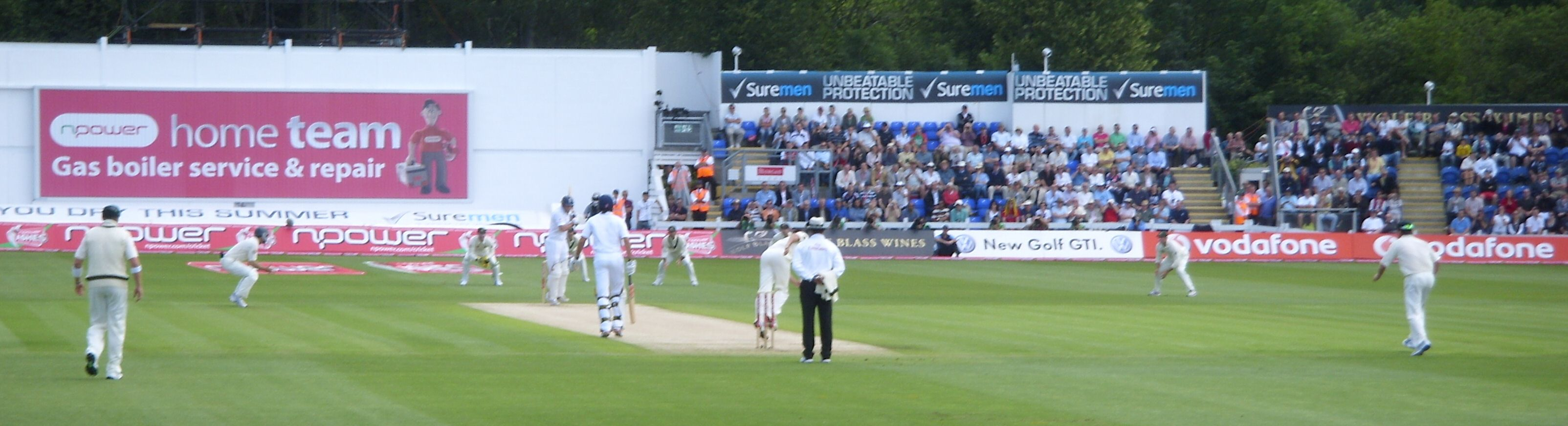
Opening ball of the 2009 Ashes series (Mitchell Johnson to Andrew Strauss) SWALEC Stadium, Sophia Gardens, Cardiff – home of the Cricket Board of Wales, Glamorgan Cricket, the Welsh Cricket Academy and the Welsh Cricket Association

== Curling ==
The Welsh Curling Association (Cymdeithas Cwrlio Cymraeg) (WCA) is the governing body of curling in Wales.

== Cycling ==
Beicio Cymru-Welsh Cycling is "the internationally recognised governing body of cycling in Wales". It administers all six cycling disciplines—BMX; cyclo-cross; mountain biking (downhill and cross-country); road racing; time trials; and track racing. Beicio Cymru-Welsh Cycling is responsible for all aspects of sports cycling in Wales including competitions and racing licences and organising the Wales Commonwealth Games cycling team. Beicio Cymru-Welsh Cycling is based at the Wales National Velodrome, Newport International Sports Village Newport.

== Fencing ==
Welsh Fencing is the governing body of fencing in Wales. In 2003 it had 34 affiliated clubs, 260 adult and 559 junior members. Welsh Fencing organises competitions including the Welsh Open. Welsh Fencing are responsible for the selection and management of the Wales representative squad, who compete in the Winton Cup and the Commonwealth Games. To compete at the European and World Championships Welsh fencers represent Great Britain, if selected. Welsh Fencing is based in Canton, Cardiff.

== Football ==
The Football Association of Wales (Cymdeithas Bêl-droed Cymru) (FAW) is the third oldest football association in the world. It has been the governing body of football in Wales since its formation in 1876. The FAW is one of the associations that make up a body called the International Football Association Board (IFAB)—the others are the other three UK associations: the Football Association, the Scottish Football Association and the Irish Football Association plus FIFA, the world governing body. The IFAB maintain the laws that govern football, known officially as the "Laws of the Game". Football is the most popular team sport in Wales, with more than twice as many participants as rugby union.

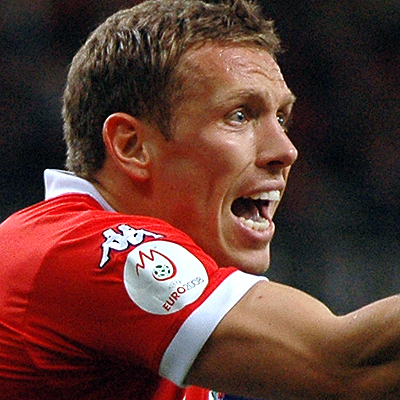
Former captain Craig Bellamy representing Wales at a UEFA Euro 2008 qualifier

The FAW has six affiliated Area Football Associations: Central Wales; Gwent County; North East Wales; North Wales Coast; South Wales; and West Wales. The FAW is based at Cardiff Bay.

The Welsh Football Trust (Ymddiriedolaeth Bêl-droed Cymru) (WFT) (founded 1996) was established by the FAW to encourage more children in Wales to play football, to develop player and coaching talent and to support the future success of Welsh national teams. In addition to the FAW, the WFT is supported by the Welsh Government, the Sports Council of Wales and the Premier League. The Welsh Football Trust is based in Parc Nantgarw, Rhondda Cynon Taf.

== Golf ==
The Wales Golf (Golff Cymru) is the governing body of amateur golf in Wales. It is responsible for administration and enforcement of the handicapping and course rating systems for ladies and men in Wales. Wales Golf organise competitions, including the National Championships in Wales, and select and manage all Welsh amateur golf teams. It also makes, maintains and publishes any necessary rules and regulations. The Golf Union of Wales is based in Catsash, Newport.

== Gymnastics ==
Welsh Gymnastics (founded 1902 as the Welsh Amateur Gymnastics Association) is the national governing body for gymnastics in Wales. It has overall responsibility for the administration of all eight gymnastics disciplines in Wales—women's artistic, men's artistic and rhythmic gymnastics, general gymnastics, sports acrobatics, sports aerobics, trampolining and tumbling—through its four geographical areas (north, south, east and west), which are responsible for their own area competition and squad training sessions.

Welsh Gymnastics organises the Welsh national and international teams and competitions.

Welsh Gymnastics is based at the WSport Wales National Centre, Sophia Gardens, Cardiff.

== Hockey ==
Hockey Wales (Hoci Cymru) (HW) is the national governing body for hockey in Wales. It was established in 1996 by the merger of the Welsh Hockey Association (founded 1896) and the Welsh Women's Hockey Association (founded 1897). In 2011, the operating name was changed to Hockey Wales.

HW is responsible for the administration of all aspects of the game including clubs, competitions, development, internationals, schools, umpiring and universities.

HW organises national competitions include Men's and Women's Welsh Cups. Internationally, Welsh players compete at the Olympic games as part of the Great Britain team. In all other competitions, including the Hockey World Cup and the Commonwealth Games, Wales competes in its own right. The Wales hockey team also compete at the EuroHockey Nations Trophy (ENT). Other countries that compete at the ENT are Belarus, Czech Republic, Ireland, Italy, Russia, Scotland and Switzerland.

Hockey Wales is based in Sport Wales National Centre, Cardiff

== Ice Skating ==
The Welsh Ice Skating Association (WISA) is the governing body of ice skating for Wales. WISA organises the Welsh Championship. The Welsh Ice Skating Association is managed from, and is based in, England.

== Judo ==
The Welsh Judo Association (Welsh: Cymdeithas Judo Cymru) (WJA) is the governing body for judo in Wales. The WJA has 80 affiliated clubs and over 2,400 members. It is responsible for managing the Welsh High Class Performance Squads, from which the National Coach—double judo Olympic silver medallist Neil Adams—selects the Welsh national team to compete at international events. The Welsh Judo Association and the Welsh Judo Association Academy are based at the Sport Wales National Centre, Sophia Gardens, Cardiff.

== Karate ==
The Welsh Karate Governing Body is the governing body of karate in Wales.

== Korfball ==
The Welsh Korfball Association (Cymdeithas Bêl-Corff Cymru) (founded 2002) (WKA) is the governing body for korfball in Wales. The WKA is responsible for the Welsh Korfball League, Wales squad selection, international matches, the training and development of players, and coaches and referees.

Wales compete in the European Bowl, European Championships, and have qualified for the World Championship in the past. Wales' current IKF world ranking is 23rd (updated Nov. 2014).

== Lacrosse ==
The Welsh Lacrosse Association (WLA) is the governing body for lacrosse in Wales. The WLA is responsible for international competitions, including the International Festival of Lacrosse at Ebbw Vale in 1992—the first Welsh men's international Game for 85 years and the first to be played in Wales—and manages the Wales teams that play in the European and World Championships. It also manages 'Centres of Development and Excellence' for the juniors' field game.

The Welsh Lacrosse Association is based at Penarth, Vale of Glamorgan.

== Motor Sports ==
The Welsh Association of Motor Clubs is the governing body of Motor Sports in Wales. It is a "Regional Association" of the Motor Sports Association.

== Netball ==
Wales Netball (Welsh: Pêl-rwyd Cymru) is the main governing body for netball in Wales. It was originally founded in 1945 as the Welsh Netball Association (Welsh: Cymdeithas Pêl-rwyd Cymru). In 2021, it adopted its current name. It is affiliated to both World Netball and Europe Netball. Wales Netball were founding members of both these governing bodies. It is responsible for organising and administering the Wales national netball team and the Netball Super League team, Cardiff Dragons, as well local leagues and other competitions. Since 2009, its headquarters have been based at the Sport Wales National Centre.

== Orienteering ==
The Welsh Orienteering Association (Cymdeithas Cyfeiriannu Cymru) (WOA) is the national governing body for the sport of orienteering in Wales, and is a constituent association of the British Orienteering Federation.

The WOA is responsible for encouraging, developing and controlling the sport of orienteering throughout Wales, for running the Welsh League and events, including the Welsh Championships, the Welsh Short Championships and the Welsh Orienteering festival—Croeso (English: Welcome)—held every four years.

The Welsh Orienteering Association has nine affiliated clubs.

== Pétanque (Boule) ==
The Welsh Pétanque Association (Cymdeithas Pétanque Cymru) (WPA) (established 2004) is the governing body for the sport of pétanque in Wales. The WPA is affiliated to the Confédération Européenne de Pétanque (CEP) and the Fédération Internationale de Pétanque et Jeu Provençal (FIPJP). It aims to promote the sport's development for all people in Wales. The Welsh Pétanque Association organises competition at national and international level, including League and National Competitions and the Welsh Cup for Clubs—the winning club qualifying for the EuroCup (European Cup for Clubs)—and is responsible for the selection of the Wales national squads, who compete in international events including the Celtic Challenge, European Championships and World Championships.

The Welsh Pétanque Association has 13 registered clubs and is based at Pontyclun, Rhondda Cynon Taf.

== Pool ==
The Welsh Pool Association is the governing body of pool in Wales. The WPA play under blackball rules and have in excess of 10,000 registered players from more than 80 interleague teams throughout Wales. The WPA also spans to international level pool with representation from Men's, Ladies, Youths, Seniors and Specials teams. Running alongside the interleague programme are the Men's, Youths and Seniors Welsh Open Tour events.

== Rowing ==
Welsh Rowing (Rhwyfo Cymru) (WARA) is the national governing body for rowing in Wales. It is responsible for the organisation of all national rowing competitions held in Wales, including the 'Head of the Taff' and the Welsh Open Rowing Championships, and for the selection and management of the Welsh national rowing teams and the organisation of all international rowing competitions held in Wales. It has 13 affiliated clubs, including schools and universities. Welsh Rowing is based at Grangetown, Cardiff.

The Welsh Sea Rowing Association (Cymdeithas Rhwyfo Môr Cymru) (WSRA) is the national governing body for coastal and ocean rowing in Wales. It is responsible for coastal rowing competitions in Wales, including the WSRA League, which has two racing categories: Celtic Longboats; and Yoles. It is a member of the Welsh Amateur Rowing Association-Rhwyfo Cymru (WARA) and is represented at WARA at board level and on the Performance, the Development, Coaching and Education, and the Events Sub-Committees. The Welsh Sea Rowing Association is based at Aberystwyth, Ceredigion.

== Rugby League ==
Wales Rugby League (Cymru RL) (WRL) is the sole controller and national governing body for Rugby league in Wales. Its objective is to promote, encourage and develop the sport of rugby league in Wales. Having been granted "stand alone status" in Wales from the Rugby Football League, WRL is responsible for the successful running of the game in Wales, for organising games and competitions and for selecting the squad for the national teams. In addition to managing professional and amateur national representative senior teams, WRL runs several age grade international sides from under 13s to a student team. The senior teams each play in annual European competitions, and the professional side compete in the World Cup every 4 years.

WRL has 14 affiliated clubs, including four university clubs. Wales Rugby League is based at the Brewery Field, Bridgend.

== Rugby Union ==
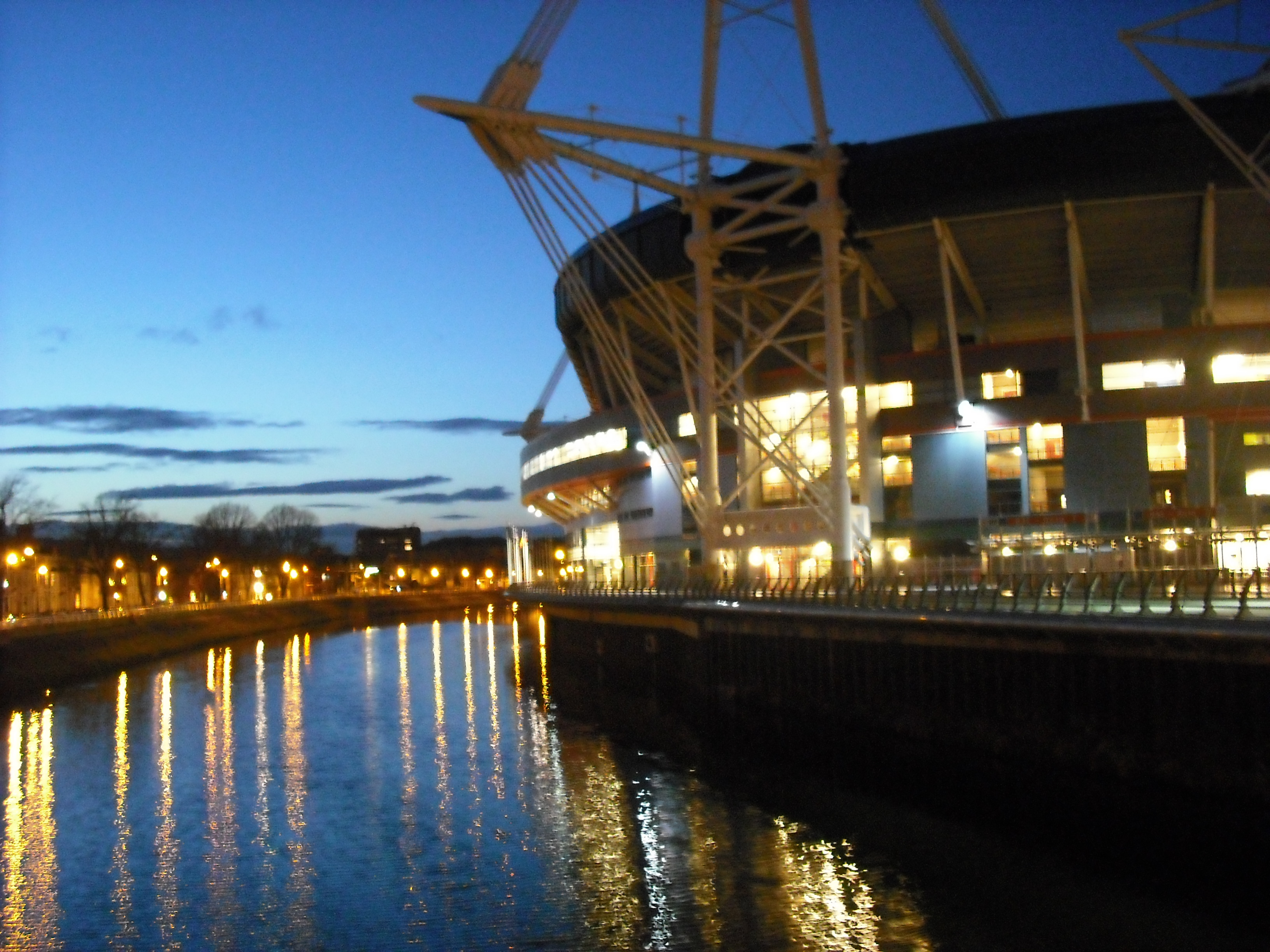
The Millennium Stadium, Cardiff owned by the WRU

The Welsh Rugby Union (Undeb Rygbi Cymru) (WRU) was founded as the Welsh Rugby Football Union at the Castle Hotel, Neath on 12 March 1881, by a group of 11 clubs: Bangor; Brecon; Cardiff; Lampeter; Llandeilo; Llandovery; Llanelli; Merthyr; Newport; Pontypool; and Swansea.

The WRU is the governing body of rugby union in Wales, with overall responsibility for organising and running the national game of Wales—rugby union—in Wales including: the rules and regulations that the domestic game of rugby is played under in Wales; player registration and transfer between clubs; player and club disciplinary sanctions; codes of conduct for players, coaches, team managers, club officials, match officials and referee advisors; and the protocol for games in Wales.

The 74,500 capacity Millennium Stadium, Cardiff, "an icon of the modern Wales", is wholly owned by the WRU. In addition to rugby union—the Millennium Stadium has staged the 1999 Rugby World Cup and pool stages of the 2007 Rugby World Cup, the IRB Sevens World Series in 2001, two Wales Rugby Grand Slams (2005 and 2008), the British and Irish Lions vs Argentina in 2005, and the 2002, 2006, 2008 and 2009 Heineken Cup finals—the stadium has hosted a range of events, including a variety of music—starting with the Manic Street Preachers' Manic Millennium concert held on Millennium Eve, through the BBC's Songs of Praise, a tsunami relief concert with Eric Clapton in 2005, Madonna in 2006 and in 2008, The Rolling Stones in 2006 to U2 in 2009— and other sports events—the Wales national football team usually play their international football home matches at the stadium; English football's League Cup Final, Football League Trophy, FA Cup Final and the FA Community Shield were played at the Stadium (from the 2000–01 to 2005–06 seasons) while Wembley Stadium was being rebuilt; the British Speedway Grand Prix has been held at the Stadium since 2001; three Rugby Football League Challenge Cup finals were held at the Millennium Stadium (from the 2002–03 to 2004–05 seasons); the World Rally Championship, as part of Wales Rally GB, have been staged at the stadium since 2005; Express Eventing was held at the stadium in 2008: and Joe Calzaghe's victory over Mikkel Kessler in the super middleweight reunification bout was held at the Stadium, Calzaghe retaining his WBO title and winning the WBA and WBC world titles.

The Wales rugby union team has had considerable success. Wales were 3rd in the 1987 Rugby World Cup, have been International Championship winners 24 times outright (in 1893, 1900, 1902, 1905, 1908, 1909, 1911, 1922, 1931, 1936, 1950, 1952, 1956, 1965, 1966, 1969, 1971, 1975, 1976, 1978, 1979, 1994, 2005 and 2008) and joint winners 11 times (1906, 1920, 1932, 1939, 1947, 1954, 1955, 1964, 1970, 1973 and 1988), of which ten have been Welsh Grand Slams and 19 Triple Crowns. The Wales team has had some success against southern hemisphere opposition too: Wales have beaten Australia ten times (1908, 1947, 1958, 1969, 1973, 1976, 1981, 1987, 2005, and 2008); New Zealand three times (1905, 1935 and 1953); and South Africa once, in 1999.

== Sailing ==
RYA Cymru-Wales is the governing body for the sports of powerboating, sailing and windsurfing in Wales. The organisation is divided into north, south and west regions. Sailing clubs in Wales are members of the Royal Yachting Association (RYA) and, as individuals must join the RYA to race, RYA Cymru-Wales has no personal members. Its purpose is "... to feed the RYA GBR performance pathway, and ultimately Team GBR 2012 and beyond.". Wales contributed 10-15% to the Great Britain Olympic Sailing Squads in 2008. RYA Cymru-Wales is based at the National Watersports Centre for Wales, Plas Menai, Gwynedd.

== Shooting ==
The Welsh Target Shooting Federation (Ffederasiwn Saethu Targedau Cymru) (WTSF) is the governing body for shooting sports in Wales. It represents the member bodies of the WTSF—the Welsh Airgun Association (WAA), the Welsh Clay Target Shooting Association (WCTSA), the Welsh Rifle Association (WRA) and the Welsh Small-bore Rifle Association (WSRA)—by promoting and developing shooting sports in Wales. The Welsh Target Shooting Federation is based in Cardiff.

The Welsh Clay Target Shooting Association (WCTSA) is the governing body for clay target shooting (also known as clay pigeon shooting) in Wales. It represents its members' interests at a national and international level. The WCTSA has 65 affiliated clubs. It is responsible for score registration and classification, organising national competitions and the selection and running of the national representative teams. The Welsh Clay Target Shooting Association is based in Caersws, Powys.

== Skiing ==
Snowsport Cymru/Wales is the governing body of skiing and snowboarding in Wales. Snowsport Cymru/Wales' membership comprises individuals, schools, corporate sponsors and six affiliated clubs. Snowsport Cymru/Wales selects, organises and trains the Welsh National Ski Squad. Snowsport Cymru/Wales manages the Cardiff Ski & Snowboard Centre, Fairwater, Cardiff, where it is based.

== Snooker ==
The Welsh Billiards & Snooker Association is the governing body of the cue sports billiards and snooker in Wales. The Welsh Billiards & Snooker Association is based in Winch Wen, Swansea.

== Squash ==
Squash Wales is the governing body of squash in Wales. It has 121 affiliated clubs and is a member of the World Squash Federation and the European Squash Federation. Squash Wales is responsible for the administration of all aspects of the game including clubs, regional and national leagues, player development and the selection and management of the international squad for competitions, including the European Team Championships and the World Championships. Recent success for the Wales team includes the Bronze medal won in the European Team Championships in Malmö (May 2009), which was the 14th European Team medal won by Wales in all ages since 1997. The Wales team won a world silver medal in 1999. National competitions organised by Squash Wales include the Welsh Inter-County Challenge Shield and the Welsh Open. Squash Wales is based at the Sport Wales National Centre, Cardiff.

== Sub Aqua ==
The British Sub Aqua Club (BSAC) is the National Governing Body of sub aquatic sports in Wales, including scuba diving and snorkelling.

An affiliate of BSAC, the British Octopush Association (BOA), is responsible for underwater hockey (also a form of sub aqua) in Wales. However, training and management of Welsh national squads is controlled by Underwater Hockey Wales (Hoci Tanddwr Cymreig).

== Surfing ==
The Welsh Surfing Federation (WSF) is the national governing body of surfing in Wales, affiliated to the European Surfing Federation. It is responsible for promoting the sport by organising National Championships, participating in other events to raise public awareness and for selecting teams to represent Wales at an international level. The Welsh Surfing Federation is based at the Welsh Surfing Federation Surf School in Llangennith, Gower, which it owns.

== Surf lifesaving ==
The Surf Life Saving Association of Wales (SLSAW) (formed 1969) is the governing body of surf lifesaving in Wales. Its goal is "to prevent the loss of life through drowning". The SLSAW organise regional and national competitions—such as the SLSA Wales Stillwater Leagues and the SLSA Wales Ocean Masters Championships—and select and manage the Wales squad for international events, including the Celtic Challenge Cup. It has 26 affiliated voluntary lifeguard clubs and over 1500 members (adult and junior). The Surf Life Saving Association of Wales is based in Llantwit Major, Vale of Glamorgan.

== Swimming ==
Swim Wales (Nofio Cymru) (WASA) (founded 1897 as the Welsh Amateur Swimming Association) is the governing body of diving, swimming (including open water and synchronised swimming) and water polo, in Wales. It is responsible for establishing the laws of the sport, for organising certification and education programmes for coaches, officials and teachers and for recreational swimming, aiming to ensure that everybody in Wales has the opportunity to learn to swim.

Swim Wales is structured regionally—with over 90 member clubs and a combined membership of over 9,800 members in the South East Wales, West Wales and North Wales regions—supporting their affiliated swimming, diving, water polo, masters and disabled clubs. It manages the development of competitive swimming sports from starter to international level, and organises competitions, including closed, national and open championships. Swim Wales is based at the Wales National Pool, Sketty, Swansea.

== Table Tennis ==
The Table Tennis Association of Wales (Cymdeithas Tenis Bwrdd Cymru) (TTAW) (founded 1921) is the governing body of table tennis in Wales. It is affiliated to the International Table Tennis Federation (ITTF) and the European Table Tennis Union, and was a founding member of both organisations, in 1926 and 1956 respectively. The TTAW has over 1000 members, regulates and manages competitions—including ten leagues, the Welsh Open Championships, the Welsh Closed Championships and the Team Championship of Wales— and is responsible for the selection, organisation and management of the Welsh national representative teams. The Wales men's team was ranked 43 in the world (of 132 ranked country associations) by the ITTF, as at 2 July 2009. The Table Tennis Association of Wales is based in Wrexham.

== Tennis ==
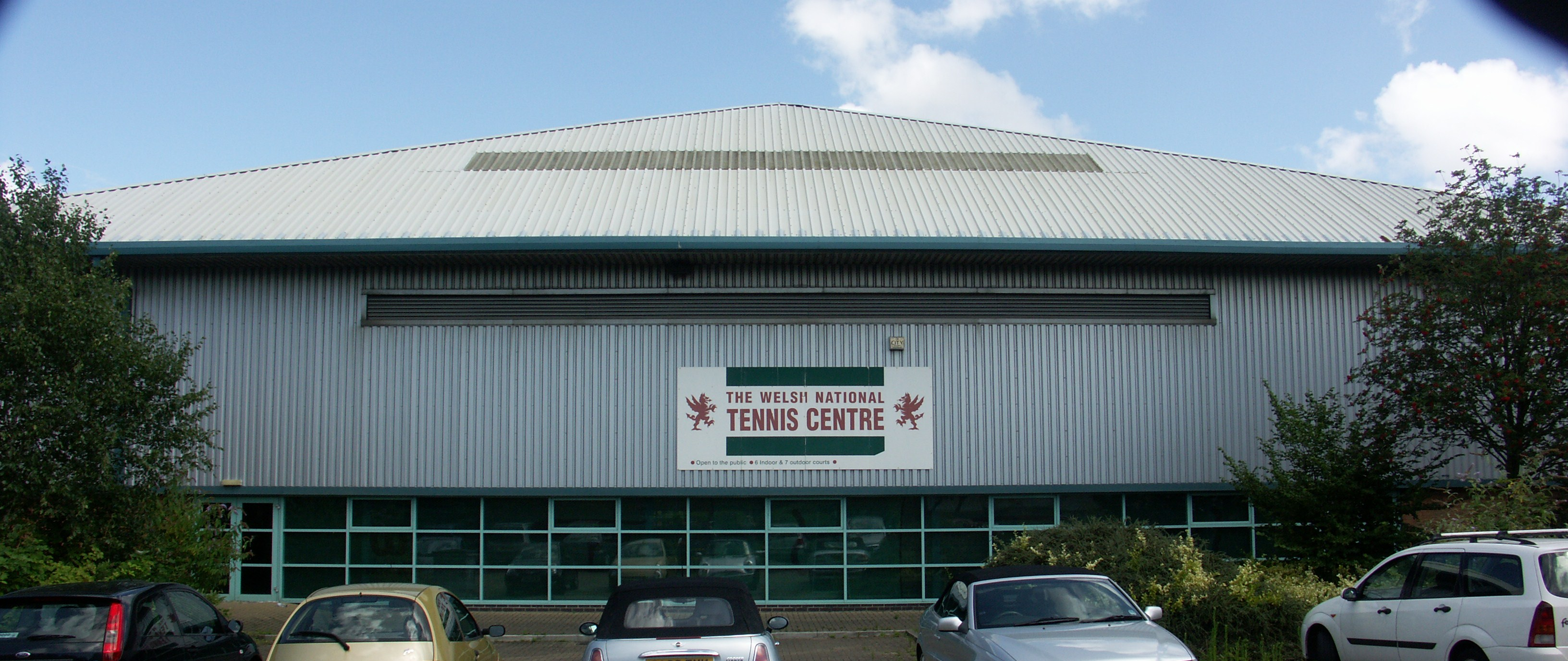
Welsh National Tennis Centre, Cardiff, home of Tennis Wales

Tennis Wales (Tenis Cymru) is the national governing body for tennis in Wales. It is part of the British tennis governing body, the Lawn Tennis Association. Tennis Wales has 98 affiliated clubs, who have just under 12,000 members between them. Tennis Wales organises junior, open and veterans' tournaments, including local and regional leagues—North Wales and South Wales—and county teams. Tennis Wales is based at The Welsh National Tennis Centre, East Moors, Cardiff, and has a regional office in Wrexham.

== Tenpin Bowling ==
The Tenpin Bowling Association of Wales (Cymdeithas Bowlio Deg Cymru) (TBAW) is the national governing body for tenpin bowling in Wales. It is a member of the Fédération Internationale des Quilleurs (English: International Bowling Federation) and the European Tenpin Bowling Federation—the "European Zone" of the World Tenpin Bowling Association. The TBAW organises leagues and tournaments, including qualifying competitions from which the top male and female players are invited to represent Wales in international competitions. The Tenpin Bowling Association of Wales is based in Llanelli, Carmarthenshire.

== Triathlon ==
Welsh Triathlon (Triathlon Cymru) is the governing body for triathlon in Wales. It aims to promote and develop the sports of triathlon and duathlon in Wales, and to encourage participation in them. Welsh Triathlon is developing a club structure for triathlon and duathlon and is responsible for the Wales representative squad in international competition. It has 24 affiliated clubs.

== Volleyball ==
Sport Wales recognise the Welsh Volleyball Association as the governing body for volleyball in Wales. However, "With there being no current active Welsh Volleyball Association, all volleyball within Welsh boundaries comes under Volleyball England's jurisdiction." Volleyball England aim to have Welsh representation at the 2009 UK School Games, due to be held in Wales the first time – in Cardiff, Newport and Swansea.
