= Surf Life Saving =

Surf Life Saving may refer to:

- Surf lifesaving, voluntary lifeguard services and competitive surf sport
- Surf Life Saving Australia, a not-for-profit community organisation
- Surf Life Saving New Zealand, a national association
- Surf Life Saving Association of Wales

== See also ==
- Lifeguard
- Surf Life Saving Club, a volunteer institution at Australia's beaches
