= Tenpin Bowling Association of Wales =

Governing body of tenpin bowling in Wales

The Tenpin Bowling Association of Wales (Welsh: Cymdeithas Bowlio Deg Cymru) (TBAW) is the national governing body for tenpin bowling in Wales. It is a member of the Fédération Internationale des Quilleurs (English: International Bowling Federation) and the European Tenpin Bowling Federation – the "European Zone" of the World Tenpin Bowling Association.

The TBAW organises leagues and tournaments, including qualifying competitions from which the top male and female players are invited to represent Wales in international competitions.

The Tenpin Bowling Association of Wales is based in Llanelli, Carmarthenshire.
