= Welsh Archery Association =

Governing body of archery in Wales

The Welsh Archery Association (WAA) is the national governing body for archery in Wales. It was established in 2000 by the merger of the South Wales Archery Society (formed 1951), the North Wales Archery Society (formed 1953) and the Welsh Archery Federation (formed 1970s), and by 2002 had 51 affiliated clubs and over 800 members. Responsibilities of the WAA include the competition, judging and coaching of archery in Wales. The WAA are also responsible for the selection and management of representative teams competing for Wales at international events.

The Welsh Archery Association is based in Barry, Vale of Glamorgan.
