= Welsh Orienteering Association =

Governing body of orienteering in Wales

The Welsh Orienteering Association (Welsh: Cymdeithas Cyfeiriannu Cymru) (WOA) is the national governing body for the sport of orienteering in Wales, and is a constituent association of the British Orienteering Federation. The WOA is responsible for encouraging, developing and controlling the sport of orienteering throughout Wales, for running the Welsh League and events, including the Welsh Championships, the Welsh Short Championships and the Welsh Orienteering festival—Croeso (English: Welcome)—held every four years. The Welsh Orienteering Association has nine affiliated clubs.
