= Welsh Fencing =

Governing body of fencing in Wales

Welsh Fencing is the national governing body of fencing in Wales. In 2003 it had 34 affiliated clubs, with 260 adult and 559 junior members. Welsh Fencing organises competitions including the Welsh Open, and is responsible for the selection and management of the Wales representative squad, who compete in the Winton Cup and the Commonwealth Games. At the European and World Championships Welsh fencers represent Great Britain, if selected.

Welsh Fencing is based in Canton, Cardiff.
