= Welsh Pétanque Association =

Governing body of pétanque in Wales

The Welsh Pétanque Association (Welsh: Cymdeithas Pétanque Cymru, WPA) (established 2004) is the governing body for the sport of pétanque in Wales. The WPA is affiliated to the Confédération Européenne de Pétanque (CEP) and the Fédération Internationale de Pétanque et Jeu Provençal (FIPJP). It aims to promote the sport's development for all people in Wales. The Welsh Pétanque Association organises competition at national and international level, including League and National Competitions and the Welsh Cup for Clubs—the winning club qualifying for the EuroCup (European Cup for Clubs)—and is responsible for the selection of the Wales national squads, who compete in international events including the Celtic Challenge, European Championships and World Championships.

The WPA has 13 registered clubs. The Welsh Pétanque Association is based at Pontyclun, Rhondda Cynon Taf.
