= Cricket Wales =

Governing body of cricket in Wales

- Sport: Cricket
- Jurisdiction: Wales
- Location: Sophia Gardens, Cardiff

Official website
- cricketwales.org.uk
- (Wales)

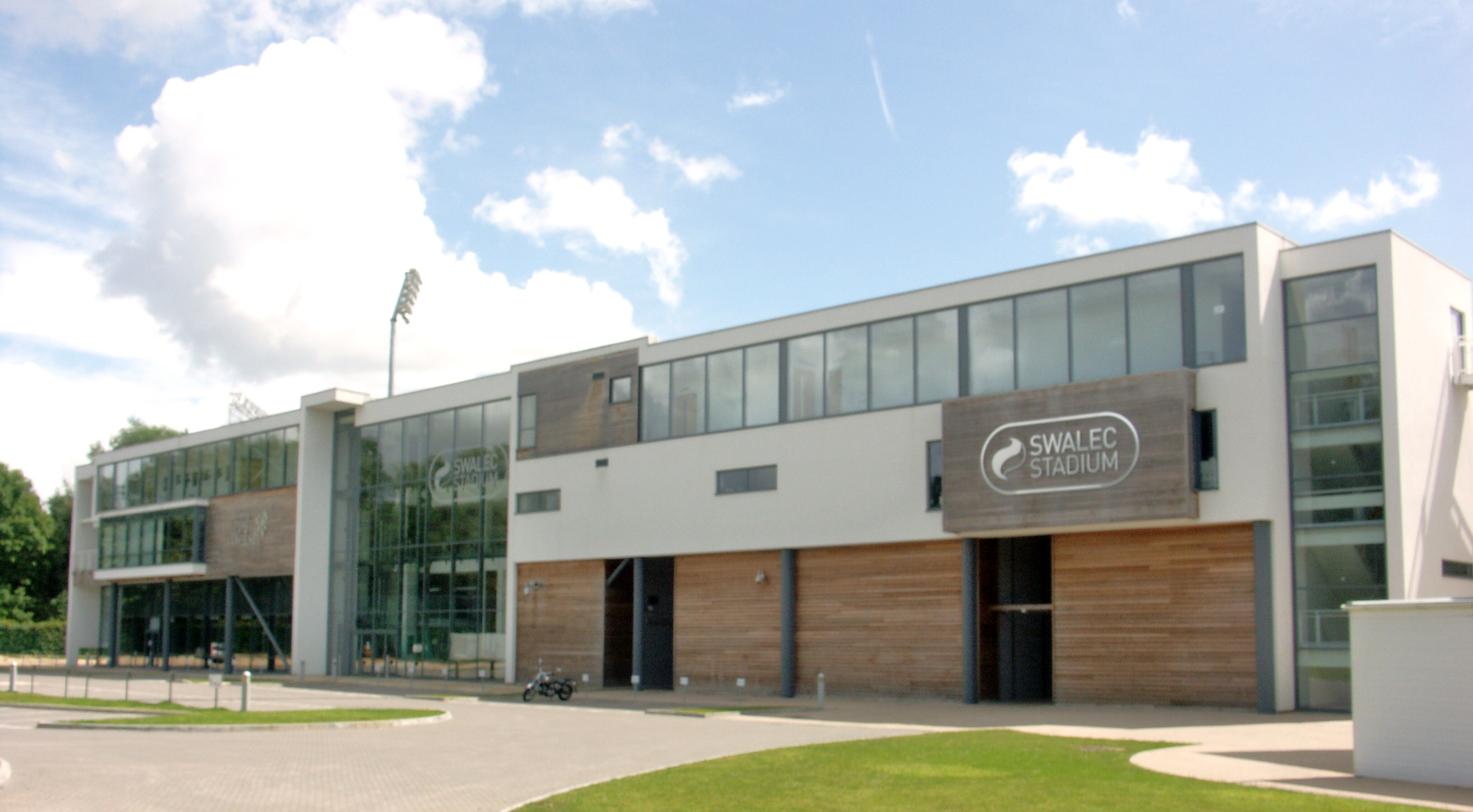
Entrance to Sophia Gardens

Cricket Wales (Welsh: Criced Cymru) is the national governing body of cricket in Wales.

It is an umbrella partnership body comprising Glamorgan County Cricket Club, Wales National County Cricket Club, the Welsh Schools Cricket Association and Sport Wales. It regulates the sport of cricket in Wales and organises competitions up to national level.

Cricket Wales is based at the SWALEC Stadium, Sophia Gardens, Cardiff.

It is affiliated with the England and Wales Cricket Board and is one of its Cricket Boards, alongside the English counties. The ECB Association of Cricket Officials (ACO) has (alongside Cricket Wales) also a single association for Wales, which is one of five regional bodies (in England & Wales).

== See also ==
- Cricket in Wales
