= Squash Wales =

Governing body of squash in Wales

- Sport: Squash
- Founded: 1939/1947
- Regional affiliation: European Squash Federation
- Location: Sophia Gardens, Cardiff
- Chairman: Richard Bennett

Official website
- www.squash.wales
- (Wales)

Squash Wales is the national governing body of squash in Wales. It has 121 affiliated clubs and is a member of the World Squash Federation and the European Squash Federation. Squash Wales is responsible for the administration of all aspects of the game including clubs, regional and national leagues, player development and the selection and management of the international squad for competitions, including the European Team Championships and the World Championships.

National competitions organised by Squash Wales include the Welsh National Squash Championships, the Welsh Inter-County Challenge Shield and the Welsh Open. Squash Wales is based at the Sport Wales National Centre, Cardiff, having moved from their office at the St Mellons Country Club, Cardiff on 7 December 2009, their home for the previous 13 years.

== History ==
The organisation was founded in 1939 as the Welsh Squash Rackets Association (WSRA) after the four leading clubs in Wales met. Lord Aberdare was elected president and Charles Gilbertson was elected chairman. N.R.R. Brooke and J.Turnbull were named as honorary treasuer and secretary respectively. In 1947 the WSRA met the Irish Squash Rackets Association Ireland at the Cardiff Squash Rackets Club, which was the first fixture for the Welsh international team. The press credited the late Maurice Turnbull as being the instrumental in bringing the WSRA together ten years previous. Some sources list the WSRA as being founded in 1947 which could be a consequence of the first international fixture.

The organisation ran under the name of the Welsh Squash Rackets Federation from 1980 following the transfer of power from the Squash Rackets Association to the self-governance of the Scottish, Welsh and Northern Irish national associations.

Recent success for the Wales team includes the Bronze medal won in the European Team Championships in Malmö (May 2009), which was the 14th European Team medal won by Wales in all ages since 1997. The Wales team won a world silver medal in 1999.

In 2012, Squash Wales Limited changed its name to Wales Squash and Racketball Ltd.

In 2017, Wales Squash and Racketball changed its name back to Squash Wales Ltd and rebranded with a new logo.

== See also ==
- Wales men's national squash team
- Wales women's national squash team
- Welsh National Squash Championships
