= Welsh Judo Association =

Governing body of judo in Wales

- Cymdeithas Judo Cymru (Welsh)
- Sport: Judo
- Jurisdiction: National
- Abbreviation: WJA
- Affiliation: British Judo Association
- Headquarters: The National Judo Centre, Sport Wales National Centre
- Location: Sophia Gardens, Cardiff
- CEO: Ben Jeffreys
- Coach: Natalie Powell

Official website
- www.welshjudo.com
- (Wales)

The Welsh Judo Association (WJA; Welsh: Cymdeithas Judo Cymru) is the governing body for the sport of judo in Wales founded in 1966 by Mr Alan Petherbridge MBE (https://www.britishjudo.org.uk/event/petherbridge-celebration-samurai-judo-club-swansea-13-oct-24/). The WJA has 40 affiliated clubs and over 2000 members. It is responsible for managing the Welsh Performance Squads the National Coach selects the Welsh national team to compete in international events. Double judo Olympic silver medallist Neil Adams is a former WJA National Coach.

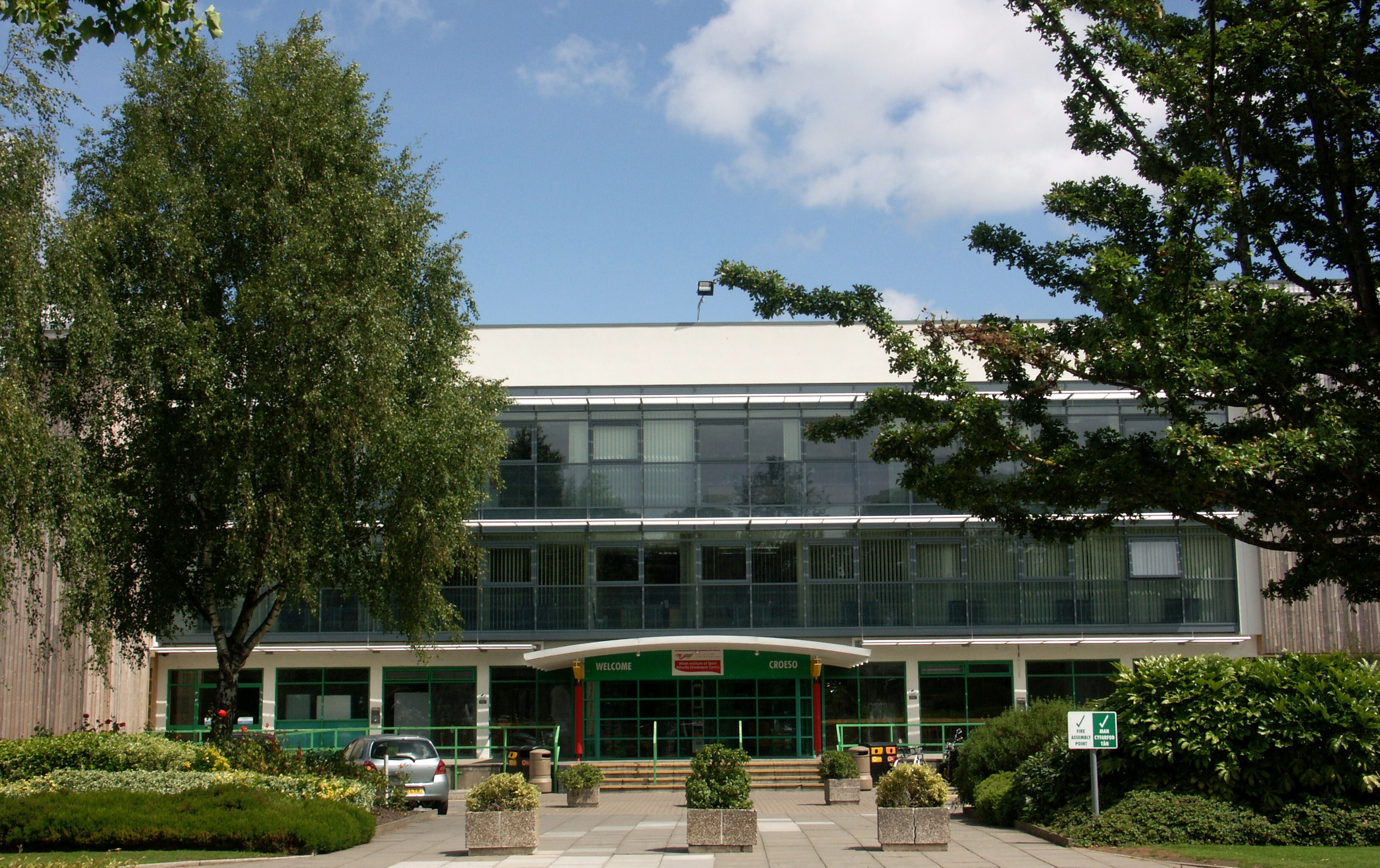
Sport Wales National Centre, home of the Welsh Judo Association

Marc Longhurst was the WJA Chair from 2021 to 2024, he was replaced by Chris Emsley .

A purpose-built GBP 1.1m dojo opened at the Institute in October 2009 to house the WJA, allowing the full-time tutorage of promising athletes.

The Welsh Judo Association is based at the Sport Wales National Centre, Sophia Gardens, Cardiff.

== Notable judokas ==
Medal record

World Judo Championships
Bronze medal – third place	Natalie Powell	2017

Natalie Powell was the first athlete from the National Judo Centre to qualify for the Olympic Games. Natalie Powell made it to the quarter-finals of the -78 kg women at Rio Olympics 2016.
