= Sport Wales National Centre =

Sports facility in Cardiff, Wales

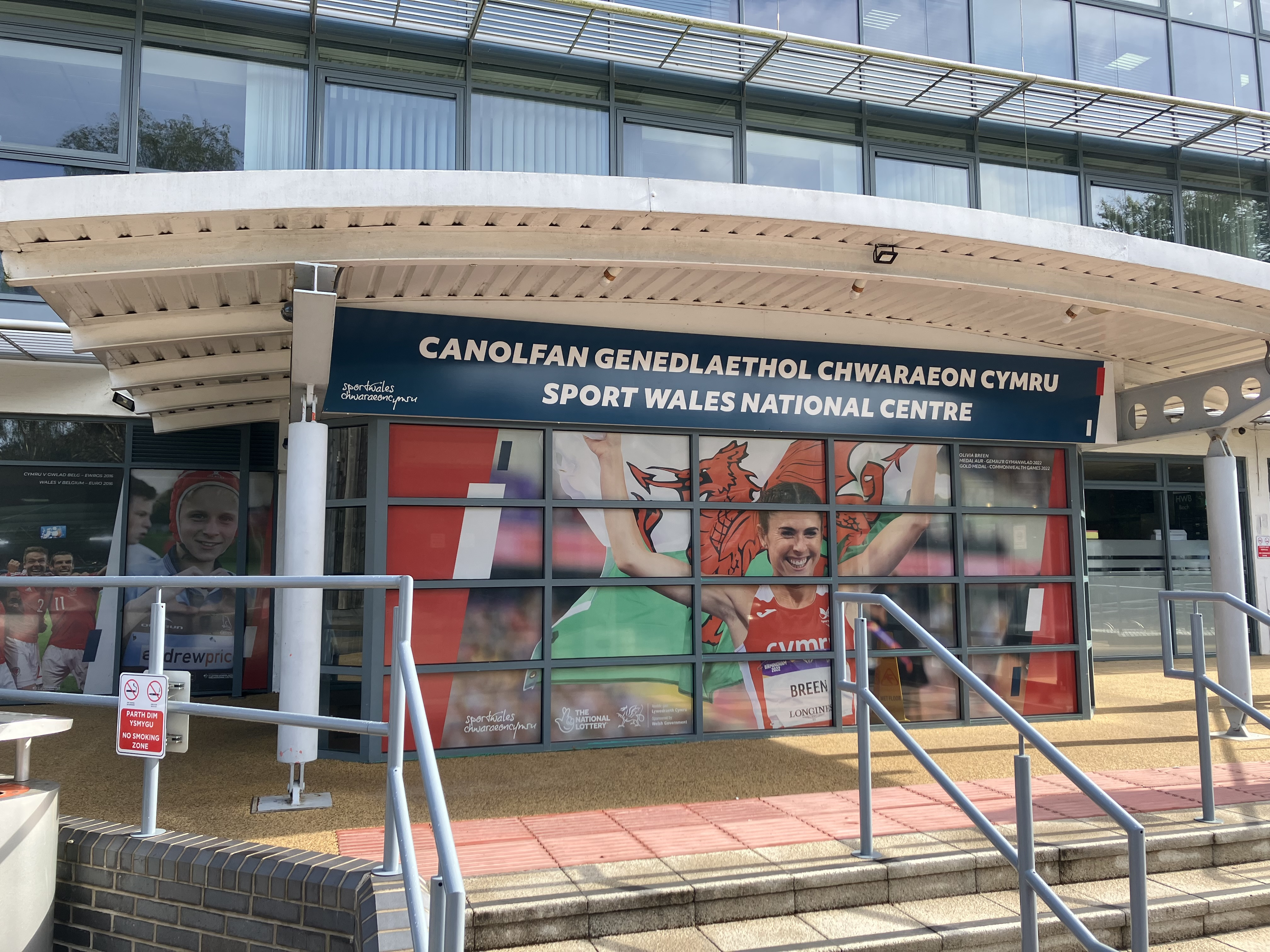
- Sport Wales National Centre, September 2023
- Interactive map of Sport Wales National Centre
- Former names: National Sports Centre for Wales (1971–94); Welsh Institute of Sport (1994–2010)
- Location: Sophia Gardens, Cardiff, Wales
- Coordinates: 51.4860°N 3.1905°W
- Owner: Sport Wales
- Operator: Sport Wales
- Capacity: 1,200 (Main Arena); 200

Construction
- Built: 1969–71
- Opened: 30 October 1971
- Architects: F. D. Williamson & Associates

The Sport Wales National Centre (Welsh: Canolfan Genedlaethol Chwaraeon Cymru) is a sports facility in Cardiff, Wales, set up to assist the development of elite athletes in Wales. The centre, owned and operated by Sport Wales, was established by the then Sports Council for Wales in 1971 as the National Sports Centre for Wales. Renamed the Welsh Institute of Sport in 1994, it has been known as the Sport Wales National Centre since April 2010.

The centre is located in Sophia Gardens, Cardiff and opened on 30 October 1971, with the official opening by Her Royal Highness the Princess Anne on 12 June 1972. The main building housing the indoor sports halls is by F. D. Williamson & Associates and is described in The Buildings of Wales as "An impressive piece of minimalism".

Several governing bodies of sports in Wales are based at the centre. It hosts the Welsh International Badminton Championship every year in December. Welsh national teams that train at the Centre include badminton, netball, gymnastics, field hockey, shooting and judo.

== Main Arena ==
- Gymnastics
- Table Tennis
- Trampoline
- Presentation
- Martial Arts
- Badminton
- Indoor football
- Netball
- Basketball

== Governing bodies at the Centre ==
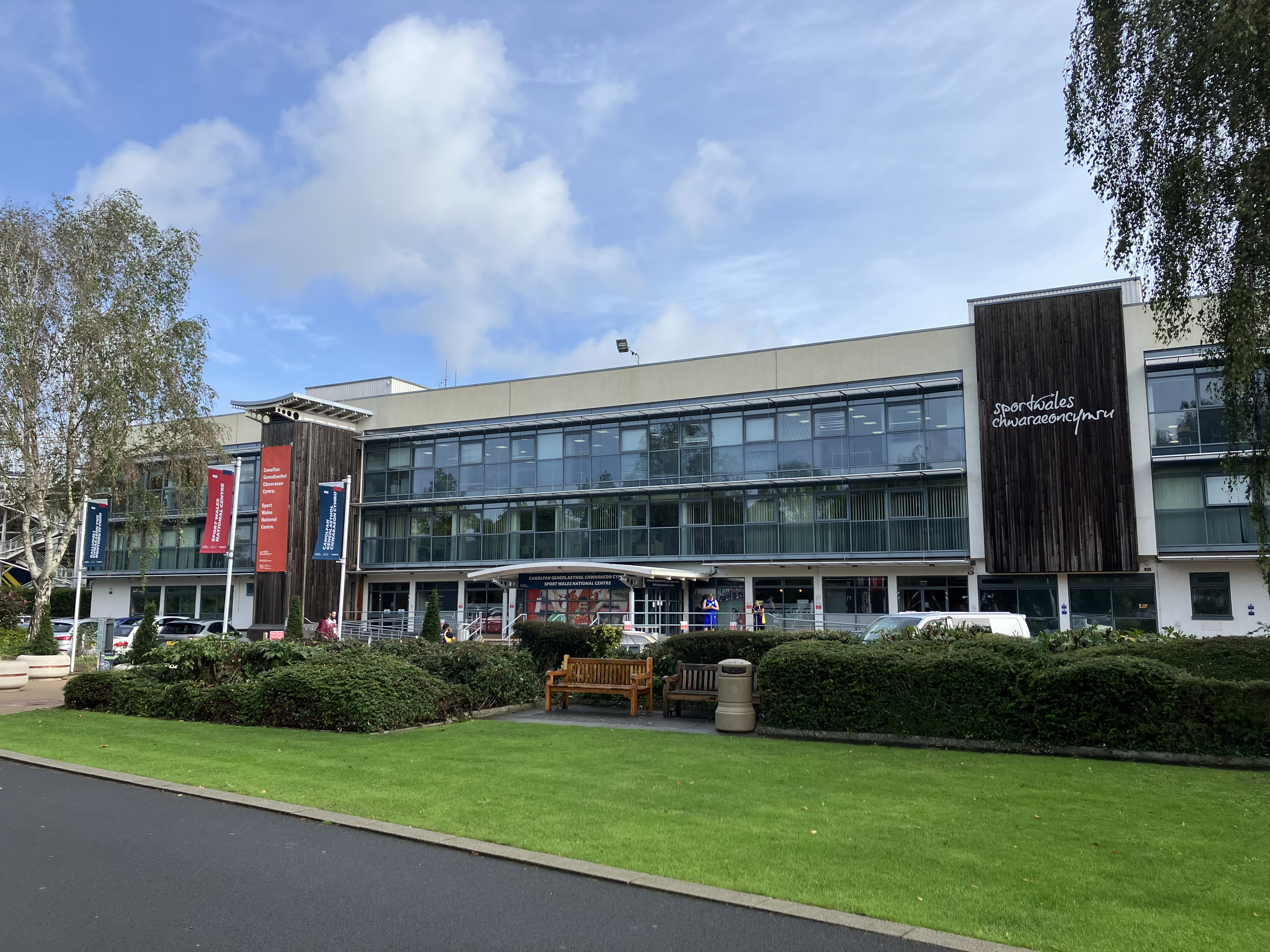
Sport Wales National Centre, September 2023

Basketball Wales is the sole controller and the governing body of all aspects of the game of basketball in Wales. It is responsible for the management of the Welsh National Basketball League, the national teams and for the organisation of all national and international basketball competitions held in Wales.

The Federation of Disability Sport Wales is the national pan-disability governing body of sports organisations that provide local sporting and physical activity opportunities to disabled people in Wales.

Hockey Wales is the national governing body for hockey in Wales. Previously known as the Welsh Hockey Union it rebranded as Hockey Wales though the organisation still retains the former name as a business. The Welsh Hockey Union was established in 1996 by the merger of the Welsh Hockey Association (founded 1896) and the Welsh Women's Hockey Association (founded 1897). Hockey Wales is responsible for the administration of all aspects of the game including clubs, competitions, development, internationals, schools, umpiring and universities.

Sport Wales is responsible for developing and promoting sport and active lifestyles in Wales. It was established in 1972 with the objectives of "fostering the knowledge and practice of sport and physical recreation among the public at large in Wales and the provision of facilities thereto". Sport Wales is the Welsh Assembly Government's main adviser on sporting matters and is responsible for distributing National Lottery awards to national governing bodies of sports in Wales.

The Welsh Judo Association (WJA) is the governing body for judo in Wales. The WJA has 80 affiliated clubs and over 2,400 members. It is responsible for managing the Welsh High Class Performance Squads, from which the National Coach—double judo Olympic silver medallist Neil Adams—selects the Welsh national team to compete at international events. A purpose-built dojo is under construction at the institute to house the WJA, allowing full-time tutorage of promising athletes.

The Welsh Sports Association (WSA) (established 1972) is an independent, umbrella body, supporting and representing the national and international interests of all the national governing bodies (NGBs) of sport and physical recreation in Wales. It has a membership of over 60 NGBs. The WSA acts as an independent consultative body to the Welsh Assembly Government, Sport Wales and to UK Sport. The Welsh Sports Association is based at the Sport Wales National Centre, Sophia Gardens, Cardiff.

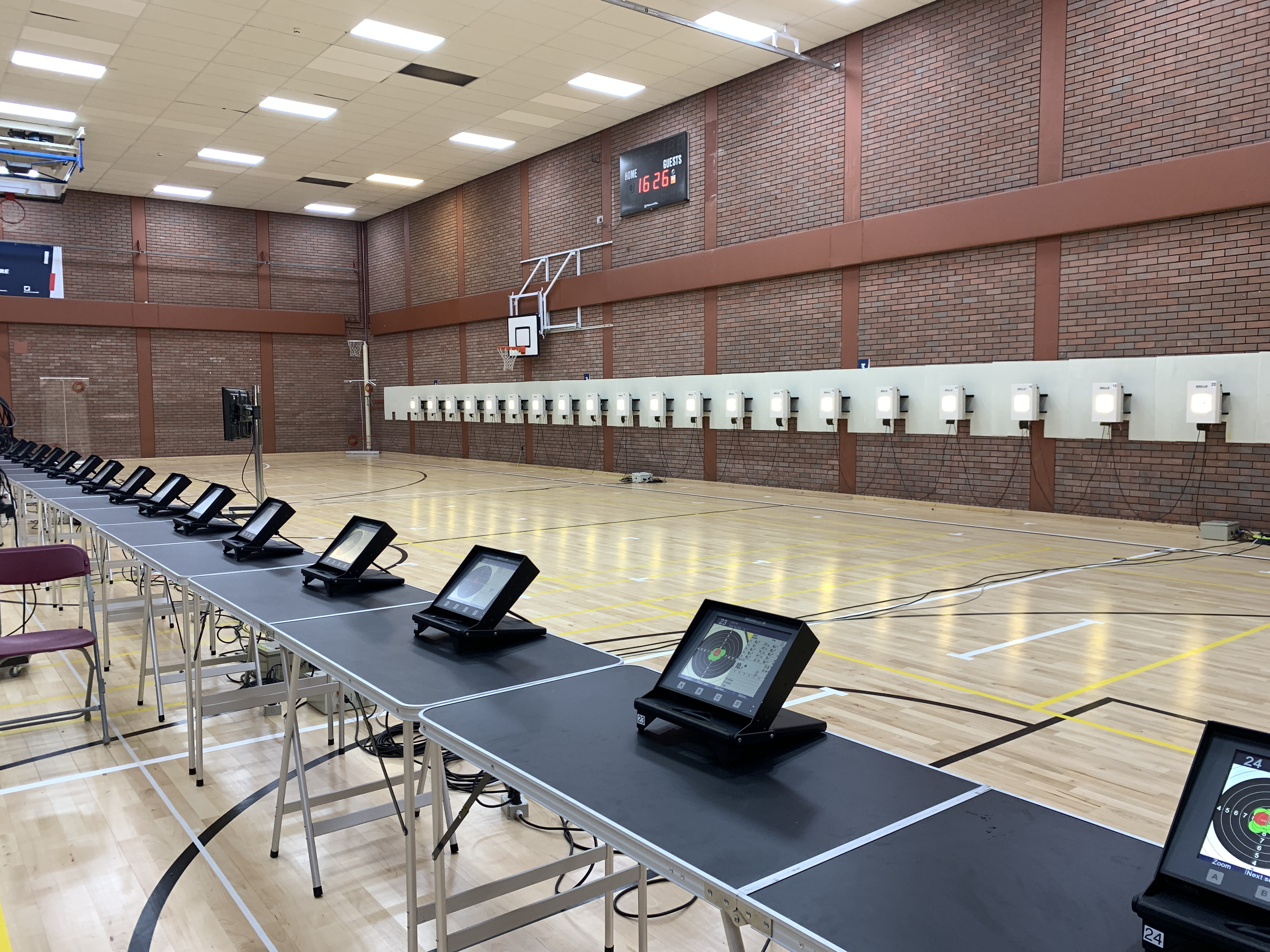
Jubilee Hall configured as an airgun range for the 2022 European Commonwealth Shooting Championships

The Welsh Target Shooting Federation represents the interests of airgun, rifle, pistol and shotgun shooting in Wales from offices in the National Centre. It also operates a 50metre outdoor and 10metre indoor range at the centre for its high performance rifle and airgun teams. These ranges have also been used as training bases by GB Academy and Talent Squads.

== See also ==
- Sport in Cardiff
- Sport in Wales
- English Institute of Sport
- Scottish Institute of Sport
- Sports Institute for Northern Ireland
