= Federation of Disability Sport Wales =

Governing body of parasports in Wales

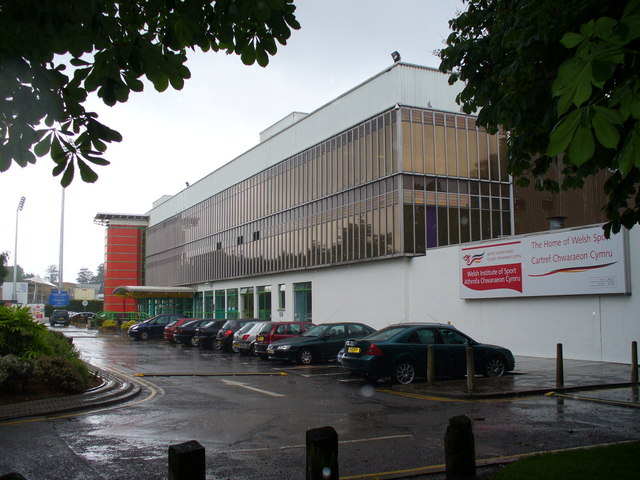
Welsh Institute of Sport, Cardiff, location of the Federation of Disability Sport Wales

The Federation of Disability Sport Wales (Welsh: Chwaraeon Anabledd Cymru) is the national pan-disability governing body of sports organisations that provides local sporting and physical activity opportunities to disabled people in Wales.

The Federation of Disability Sport Wales is based at the Sport Wales National Centre, Sophia Gardens, Cardiff.
