= Surf Life Saving Association of Wales =

Governing body of surf lifesaving in Wales

The Surf Life Saving Association of Wales (SLSAW) (formed 1969) is the national governing body of surf lifesaving in Wales. It is a voluntary, not-for-profit, registered charity organisation. Its goal is "to prevent the loss of life through drowning". The SLSAW organise regional and national competitions—such as the SLSA Wales Stillwater Leagues and the SLSA Wales Ocean Masters Championships – and select and manage the Wales squad for international events, including the Celtic Challenge Cup.

The International Life Saving Federation (ILS) Lifesaving World Championships was held jointly in Cardiff and Newquay, Cornwall in 1994. SLSA Wales became a member of ILS in 2016.

The SLSAW operates between Rhosneigr, Anglesey in North Wales, and Barry, Vale of Glamorgan, in South Wales. It has 29 affiliated voluntary lifeguard clubs and 3000 members (masters, seniors, juniors and nippers).

The Surf Life Saving Association of Wales was formed in Llantwit Major, Vale of Glamorgan.
