= Welsh Sports Association =

Sport organisation in Wales

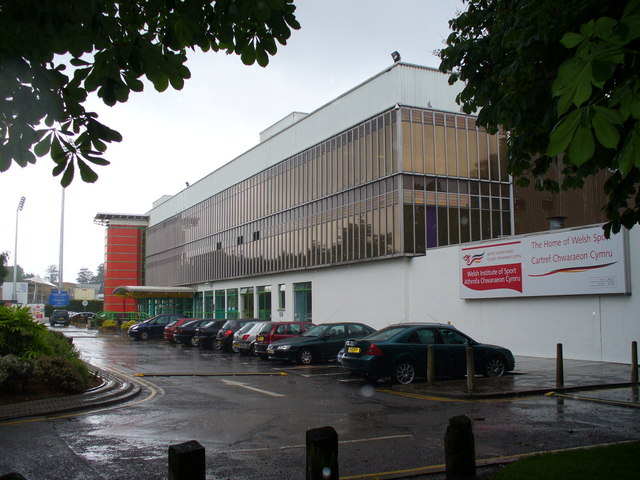
Welsh Institute of Sport, Cardiff, location of the Welsh Sports Association

The Welsh Sports Association (Welsh: Gwasanaeth Chwaraeon Cymru) (WSA) (established 1972) is the independent, umbrella body, supporting and representing the sport and leisure industry in Wales, charged with the task of leading advocacy and developing resilience across the sector. It has a 140 member organisations across the sport and leisure sector in Wales. The WSA acts as an independent consultative body to the Welsh Assembly Government, Sport Wales and to UK Sport.

The Welsh Sports Association is based at the Sport Wales National Centre, Sophia Gardens, Cardiff.

The Mission of the WSA is to empower its members to be stronger and more successful, contributing towards a society fit for the future

The WSA achieve this by:

Leading Advocacy– An independent, collective voice

Developing Resilience – Financial, organisational sustainability and Professional support, training and development.

Strategic Goals: The WSA do not deliver sport, that is the job of the WSA members. The WSA Strategic Goals are to Collaborate, Develop & Promote.

The WSA strengthen and support members – encouraging enterprise, innovation and growing potential so that they can promote prosperous and viable businesses within the sport and leisure industry in Wales.

WSA Values: Welsh Sports Association: ACTing for members. ACTing together.

AGILE – as an independent public body, the WSA are able to react to the challenges members face, often before they’re even front of mind

COLLABORATIVE – WSA create meaningful opportunities with new contacts, and strengthen existing relationships for the benefit of sport in Wales

TRUSTED – working to the highest of standards, the WSA strive to maintain the confidence of members, and integrity of the Welsh Sport Association.
