= Brownrigg =

Brownrigg is a surname. Notable people with the surname include:

- John Brownrigg (disambiguation)
- Abraham Brownrigg (1836–1928), Irish Roman Catholic Bishop of Ossory from 1884
- Andy Brownrigg (1976-), English footballer
- Douglas Brownrigg (1886–1946), senior British Army officer who became Military Secretary
- Elizabeth Brownrigg (1720–1767), English murderer
- Elizabeth Brownrigg Henderson Cotten (1875–1975), American suffragist and librarian
- George Brownrigg (1896–1981), Irish first-class cricketer
- Henry Brownrigg (disambiguation)
- Kyle Brownrigg, Canadian stand-up comedian
- Ralph Brownrigg (1592–1659), former bishop of Exeter
- Randy Brownrigg, American politician
- Robert Brownrigg (1759−1833), British statesman and soldier
- S. F. Brownrigg (1937–1996), American film director and producer
- Studholme Brownrigg (1882–1943), British admiral
- Sylvia Brownrigg (b. 1964), American author
- William Brownrigg (1711–1800), doctor and scientist

== See also ==
- Brownrigg baronets
