= Scott Brownrigg =

British architecture practice headquartered in London

Practice information
- Founded: 1910

Significant works and honors
- Buildings: Heathrow Terminal 4

Website
- www.scottbrownrigg.com

Scott Brownrigg (originally Scott Brownrigg & Turner) is a British architecture practice with nine offices in the UK and abroad, with staff of 280. It was founded in 1910 and is headquartered in London.

== Company ==
The company was originally established by Annesley Harold Brownrigg in 1910. In 1918, after serving as a major in the Royal Garrison Artillery in World War I, Brownrigg's practice in Guildford grew with Leslie Hiscock.

In 1935, following the death of Brownrigg, his son, John Brownrigg, took control with Hiscock. In 1946, Newman Turner joined John Brownrigg in 1948 and formed Brownrigg and Turner. In 1958, the practice merged with another Guildford practice Duncan Scott and created Scott Brownrigg and Turner.

Scott Brownrigg continued to grow through acquisitions including the Scottish practice Keppie Henderson in 1989, Design Research Unit in 2004 and GMW Architects in 2015.

Scott Brownrigg's chief executive is Darren Comber. In 2014 the company reported revenues of £14.9 million and profits of £1.1 million. Following the 2015 acquisition of GMW, staff numbers increased from 168 to 280.

== Notable projects ==
- Yvonne Arnaud Theatre (1965)
- Heathrow Terminal 4 (1986), London
- Manchester Airport Terminal 2 (1989)
- BBC White City One (1990), London
- UK Joint Forces Headquarters (2010), Northwood
- Ice Arena Wales (2016), Cardiff International Sports Village
- Istanbul Airport (2018), Turkey
- International Convention Centre Wales (2019), Newport

== Controversy ==
In October 2019, UK publications Construction News and Architects' Journal published a joint investigation into fatalities at Istanbul Airport - nicknamed by workers "the cemetery" as so many have died. By this point, the official death toll was 55, but unofficial estimates suggested the figure could "be higher than 400".

Scott Brownrigg was one of four architects employed on the airport's design, three of them UK-based (the other two were Grimshaw Architects and Haptic Architects). The company said that during its time on site it was "not made aware of any fatalities, poor working conditions or the site safety issues." Scott Brownrigg cannot "control the policies and procedures of our clients", was not "contractually responsible" for on-site delivery and construction, and was "shocked and saddened" by the deaths.

== Notable employee ==
- Michael Blower, associate in early 1960s
