= Sport in Cardiff =

Overview of sport in the capital city of Wales

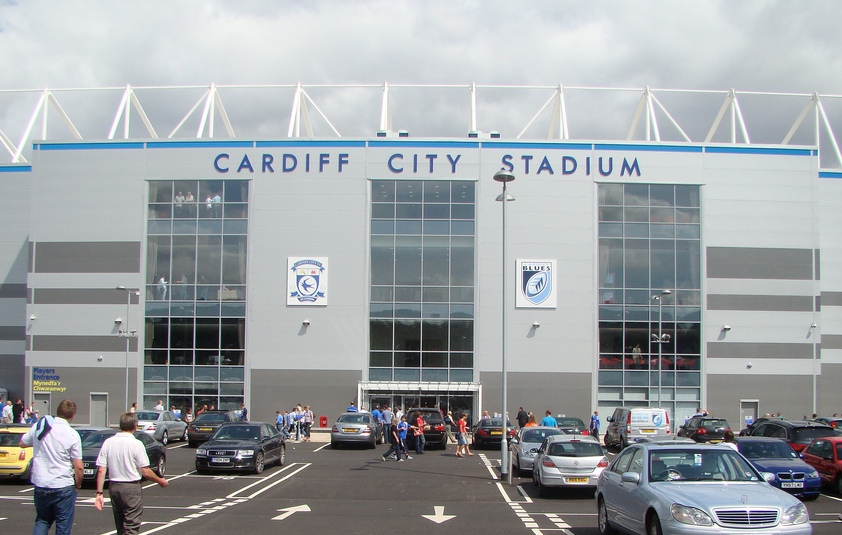
Cardiff City Stadium, the home ground of Cardiff City (association football)

Sport in Cardiff is governed by the governing bodies of sports in Wales and is dictated by, among other things, its position as Wales' capital city, meaning that national home sporting fixtures are nearly always played in the city. All of Wales' multi-sport agencies have their headquarters in Cardiff and its many top quality venues have attracted sport events, sometimes unrelated to the city or to Wales.

The city hosts numerous international sporting events, be it independently or on behalf of Wales or the United Kingdom. Rugby union fans around the world have long been familiar with the Cardiff Arms Park and its successor the Millennium Stadium, a visible presence from in and around the city. Early this century, hundreds of thousands of English football and rugby league supporters visited Cardiff during the six years (from 2001 to 2006) it took to rebuild Wembley Stadium, as the FA Cup and Rugby League Challenge Cup finals (and several other competitions) were played at the Millennium Stadium. In 2009, Cardiff hosted the first Ashes cricket test, between England and Australia, to be held in Wales. Cardiff hosted eight football matches of the London 2012 Olympics and was the training base for certain participating nations.

In 2008/09, 61% of Cardiff residents regularly participated in sport and active recreation, the highest percentage out of all 22 local authorities in Wales.

== Overview ==
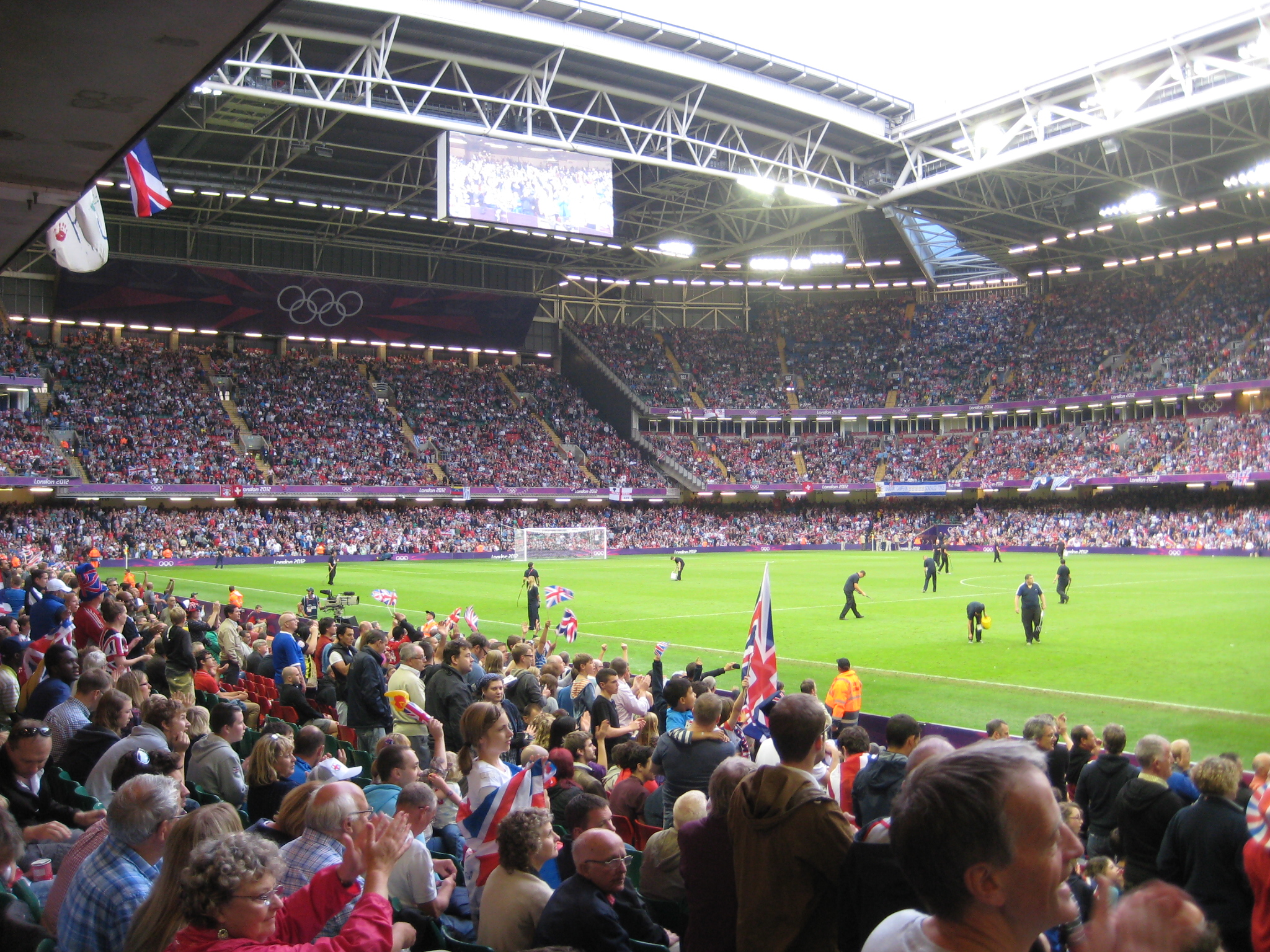
Inside the Millennium Stadium

Cardiff plays host to many high-profile sporting events at a local, national and international level. In recognition of the city's commitment to sport for all, Cardiff was awarded the title of European City of Sport 2009. Organised sports have been held in the city since the early 19th century. Cardiff Arms Park (Welsh: Parc yr Arfau Caerdydd), in central Cardiff, is among the world's most famous venues—being the scene of three Welsh Grand Slams in the 1970s (1971, 1976 and 1978) and six Five Nations titles in nine years – and was the venue for Wales' games in the 1991 Rugby World Cup. The Arms Park has a sporting history dating back to at least the 1850s, when Cardiff Cricket Club (formed 1819) relocated to the site. The ground was donated to Cardiff CC in 1867 by the Marquess of Bute. Cardiff Cricket Club shared the ground with Cardiff Rugby Football Club (founded 1876)—forming Cardiff Athletic Club between them—until 1966, when the cricket section moved to Sophia Gardens. Cardiff Athletic Club and the Welsh Rugby Union established two stadia on the site—Cardiff RFC played at their stadium at the northern end of the site, and the Wales national rugby union team played international matches at the National Stadium, Cardiff Arms Park, which opened in 1970. The National Stadium was replaced by the 74,500 capacity Millennium Stadium (Welsh: Stadiwm y Mileniwm) in 1999—in time for the 1999 Rugby World Cup—and is home stadium to the Wales national rugby and football teams for international matches. In addition to Wales' Six Nations Championship and other international games, the Millennium Stadium held four matches in the 2007 Rugby World Cup and six FA Cup finals (from the 2000–01 to 2005–06 seasons) while Wembley Stadium was being rebuilt.

== Multi-sport organisations ==
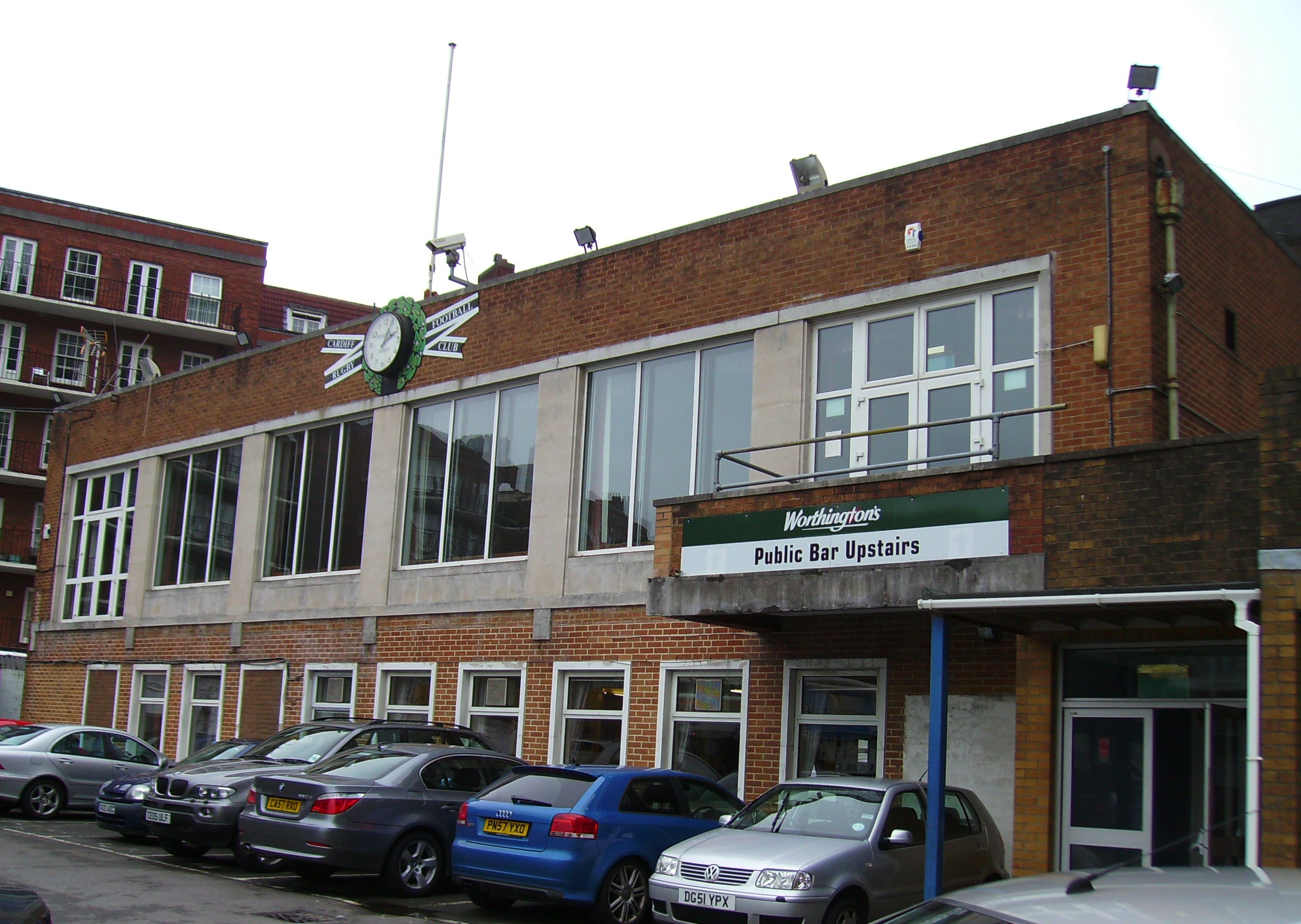
Cardiff Athletic Club

Sport Wales (Chwaraeon Cymru), the Welsh Sports Association (Gwasanaeth Chwaraeon Cymru) and the Federation of Disability Sport Wales (Chwaraeon Anabledd Cymru), the country's multi-sport agencies, are based at the Sport Wales National Centre, Sophia Gardens.

Sport Wales is responsible for developing and promoting sport and active lifestyles in Wales. It was established in 1972 with the objectives of "fostering the knowledge and practice of sport and physical recreation among the public at large in Wales and the provision of facilities thereto". Sport Wales is the Welsh Assembly Government's main adviser on sporting matters and is responsible for distributing National Lottery awards to sports in Wales.

The Welsh Sports Association (WSA) (established 1972) is an independent, umbrella body, supporting and representing the national and international interests of all the national governing bodies (NGBs) of sport and physical recreation in Wales. It has a membership of over 60 NGBs. The WSA acts as an independent consultative body to the Welsh Assembly Government, Sport Wales and to UK Sport.

The Federation of Disability Sport Wales is the national pan-disability governing body of sports organisations that provide local sporting and physical activity opportunities to disabled people in Wales.

Cardiff Athletic Club is a multi-sport club and owns the Cardiff Arms Park site. It was established in 1922, and has been the main body responsible for much of the premier amateur sporting activities in Cardiff. The Athletic Club has cricket (Cardiff Cricket Club), rugby union (Cardiff RFC), field hockey (Cardiff Hockey Club), tennis (Lisvane Tennis Club) and bowls (Cardiff Athletic Bowls Club) sections.

== Team sports ==
=== Baseball ===
Cardiff is one of the centres of British baseball and hosts the annual Wales vs England international game every other year, usually at Roath Park, although the 2008 game – marking the centenary of the fixture between the two countries – was held in Llanrumney. Wales won the encounter again, having not lost to England, home or away, since 1995.

Welsh Baseball Union (WBU) – formed 1892 – the governing body of men's British baseball in Wales, is based in Heath, Cardiff.

Welsh Ladies Baseball Union (WLBU), the governing body of women's British baseball in Wales, is based in Grangetown, Cardiff. It was formed in 2006 when the WLBU decided to break away from the men's WBU.

=== Basketball ===
The Cardiff City basketball team compete in the English Basketball League, Division 2. They play their home games at the Cardiff City Housevof Sport.

Basketball Wales (Pêl-fasged Cymru), the sole controller and the governing body of all aspects of the game of basketball in Wales, is based at the Sport Wales National Centre, Sophia Gardens. It is responsible for the management of the Welsh National Basketball League, the national teams and for the organisation of all national and international basketball competitions held in Wales.

=== Camogie ===
Camogie was played in Cardiff in the 1980s.

=== Cricket ===
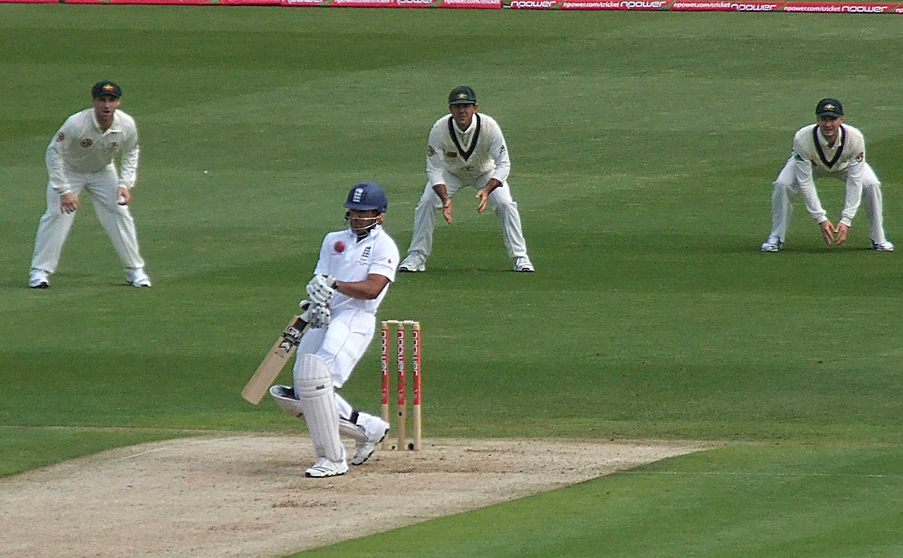
The first test of the 2009 Ashes series at the SWALEC Stadium

Cricket has been played in Cardiff since at least the early 19th century and the city's first cricket club was formed in 1819. Cardiff Cricket Club, and the clubs they played—their fixture list included teams from south Wales and the west of England—were originally considered as 'gentlemen's clubs'. As the city grew, working class players formed their own clubs and, by 1885, Cardiff had 65 cricket teams. Cardiff Cricket Club, whose first XI now play in the South Wales Cricket League – Premier Division, field a further 12 sides, including 'Midweek' and 'Sunday Friendly' XIs.

In the north west of the county, Clwb Criced Creigiau Cricket Club, whose first XI plays in the South Wales Cricket League, field another 16 sides, from Juniors to Veterans. Lisvane CC, the only club in the east of Cardiff, plays at Llwynarthen Cricket Ground and has the largest youth section in Cardiff.

Glamorgan County Cricket Club (Criced Morgannwg), the Welsh first class, professional club, played their first county match – against Monmouthshire – in 1869, and played many regular county and exhibition matches at the Arms Park, including a game against a West Gloucestershire XI that included both G. F. and W. G. Grace.

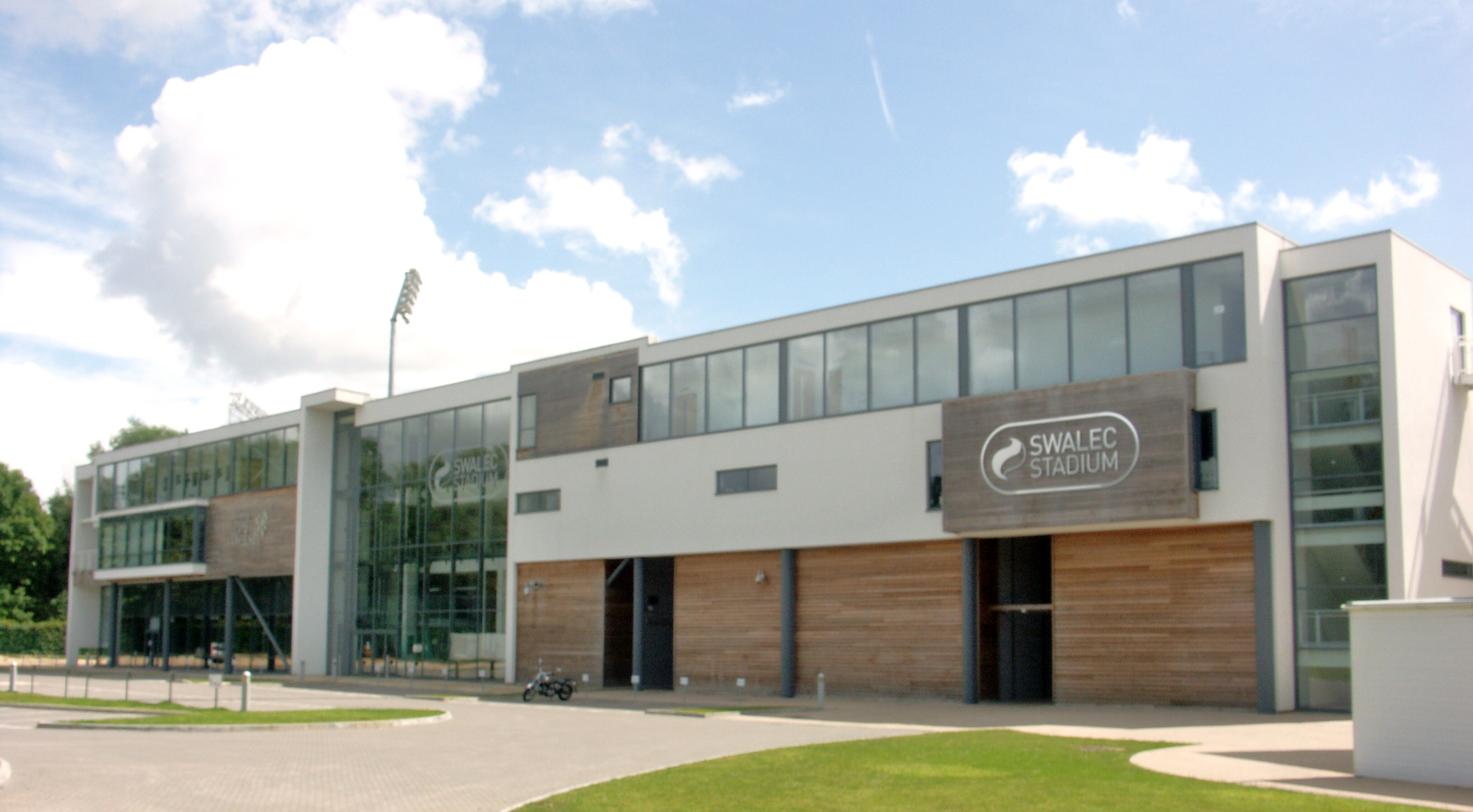
The pavilion at the SWALEC Stadium

Glamorgan CCC play in the England and Wales Cricket Board County Championship and have competed as a first class county since 1921. Their headquarters and ground is the SWALEC Stadium, Sophia Gardens, since moving from Cardiff Arms Park in 1966. The club, which has over 7000 members, also runs the Welsh Cricket Academy. The Sophia Gardens stadium underwent a multimillion-pound improvement since being selected to host the first 'England' v Australia Test match of the 2009 Ashes series.

As well as running club sides, three South Wales universities—Cardiff University, UWIC and the (Pontypridd, Rhondda Cynon Taf based) University of Glamorgan— formed the Cardiff/Glamorgan Centre of Cricketing Excellence, one of six Centres of Cricketing Excellence established by the England and Wales Cricket Board (ECB) in October 2000. The centres are aimed at male students with the potential to play first class cricket, and at female students who have played to senior county level. The Centre's day-to-day operations are at UWIC and their home matches are played at grounds used by Glamorgan CCC, including Sophia Gardens.

The Cricket Board of Wales (Bwrdd Criced Cymru) (CBW) – an umbrella partnership body comprising the Welsh Cricket Association, Glamorgan Cricket, Wales Minor Counties, the Welsh Schools Cricket Association and Sport Wales – is based at the SWALEC Stadium. It regulates the sport of cricket in Wales and organises competitions up to national level.

The Welsh Asians Cricket Club is based in Grangetown, Cardiff.

The Welsh Cricket Academy (Academi Criced Cymru), run by Glamorgan Cricket, is based at the SWALEC Stadium.

The Welsh Cricket Association (Cymdeithas Criced Cymru) (WCA) (founded 1969), the governing body of Welsh amateur cricket, is based at the SWALEC Stadium. It also runs the Welsh Cup and convenes the Welsh Coaching Forum. The WCA aims to promote, encourage, and improve amateur cricket in Wales, and to encourage and develop active participation in the game. Over 270 counties, associations, leagues and clubs are affiliated to the WCA.

The Welsh Clubs Cricket Conference is based in Llanishen.

=== Football ===
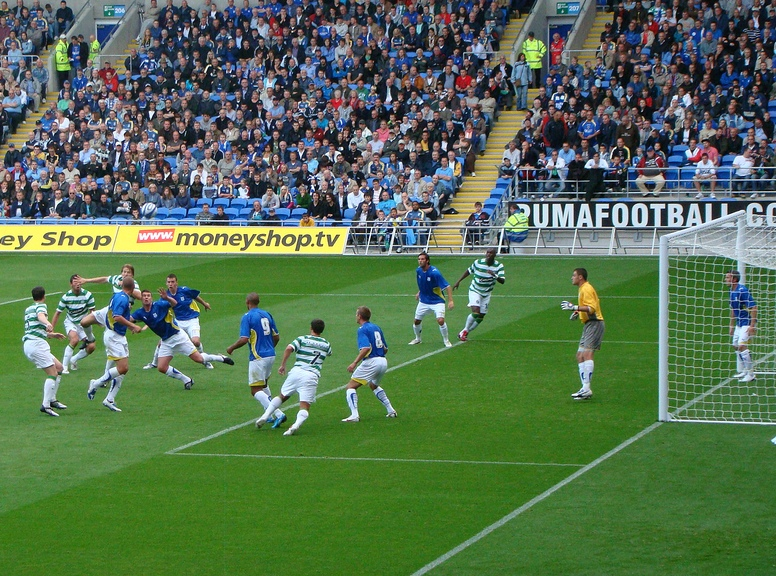
The official opening match of the Cardiff City Stadium between Cardiff City and Celtic

Cardiff City F.C. (founded 1899 as Riverside FC) played their home games at Ninian Park from 1910 until the end of the 2008–09 season. The Bluebirds' (as Cardiff City are known) new home is the Cardiff City Stadium, which they share with Cardiff Blues. Cardiff City have played in the English Football League since the 1920–21 season, climbing to Division 1 after one season. Cardiff City are the only non-English team to have won The Football Association Challenge Cup, beating Arsenal in the 1927 final at Wembley Stadium. The Bluebirds were runners up to Portsmouth in the 2008 final, losing 1–0 at the new Wembley Stadium. Cardiff City currently play in the EFL Championship, the second highest tier of the English football league system.

Cardiff Metropolitan University F.C. of the Athletic Union of Cardiff Metropolitan University, based in Cyncoed, play in the Cymru Premier, having been promoted from Welsh League Division One in 2016. They were winners of the Welsh League Cup for the 2018-19 season. Cardiff has numerous smaller clubs including Bridgend Street A.F.C., Caerau (Ely) A.F.C., Cardiff Corinthians F.C., Cardiff Grange Harlequins A.F.C., and Ely Rangers A.F.C. who all play in the Welsh football league system.

In addition to men's football teams Cardiff City Ladies of the FA Women's Premier League Southern Division are based in the city. Teams in the Welsh Premier Women's Football League are Cardiff Met. Ladies, Cyncoed Ladies and Cardiff City.

Gôl is Wales' first purpose built 5 a side football centre. Based in Canton, there are ten floodlit outdoor 5-a-side courts and one 7-a-side pitch, all using artificial 'Soccer turf'—designed to play and feel like grass.

Six FA Cup finals were held at the Millennium Stadium (from the 2000–01 to 2005–06 seasons) while Wembley Stadium was being rebuilt.

The Football Association of Wales (Cymdeithas Bêl-droed Cymru) (FAW), based at East Moors, Cardiff Bay, is the third oldest football association in the world. It has been the governing body of football in Wales since its formation in 1876. The FAW is one of the five associations—the others are FIFA, the English FA, the Scottish FA and the Irish FA—that make up a body called the International Football Association Board (IFAB). The IFAB maintain the laws that govern football, known officially as the "Laws of the Game".

=== Gaelic football ===
Cardiff is home to the St Colmcilles club, at the western edge of the Gloucestershire County Board. Gloucestershire's Welsh operations are based about there.

St Colmcilles was established in 1956 as a successor club to the Emmetts, which had ceased to operate in 1915 due to the First World War. St Colmcilles won the league in 1961 and a first county championship in 1967. They won the championship of Great Britain in 1973. However, in 1974, they ceased to operate, only to be revived (with new colours) for football at underage level in 1983. After this, a senior football team was put together, and, later, a camogie team for the ladies. St Colmcilles went on to win county league and championship at every grade, completed by the club's under-14 team winning the 1988 All-Britain.

=== Hockey ===
Cardiff & Met Hockey Club (founded 1896 as Roath Hockey Club), based at the Wales international water-base pitch, Sophia Gardens, field six men's and two ladies teams, as well as men's BUSA and youth teams. The men's first team compete in Premier Division 1 of the West of England & South Wales Hockey League and the ladies' firsts in Premier Division 1 of the South Wales Hockey League.

Renamed Cardiff Hockey Club by 1897, the club played their home games at Roath Park originally, but had moved to Llandaff Fields, Pontcanna and/or the Whitchurch Polo Fields by the 1903–04 season, where they stayed until club activities ceased in 1939. With no active hockey club in Cardiff, Cardiff Athletic Club decided to form a hockey section in 1945, as "part of its post-war reconstruction plans" and took over Cardiff Hockey Club. The ladies hockey club formed as Cardiff United in 1920, becoming part of Cardiff Athletic Club in 1927, playing as Cardiff Athletic Ladies HC. The ladies section also disbanded in 1939 and was not reformed until 1985.

The Welsh Hockey Union (Undeb Hoci Cymru) (WHU), the national governing body for hockey in Wales, is based in Ely. It was established in 1996 by the merger of the Welsh Hockey Association (founded 1896) and the Welsh Women's Hockey Association (founded 1897). The WHU is responsible for the administration of all aspects of the game including clubs, competitions, development, internationals, schools, umpiring and universities. Competitions include men's and women's Welsh Cups, and internationals such as the Eurohockey Nations Trophy (ENT), held in Wrexham in August 2009. As well as Wales, countries competing at the ENT were Belarus, Czech Republic, Ireland, Italy, Russia, Scotland and Switzerland.

=== Ice Hockey ===
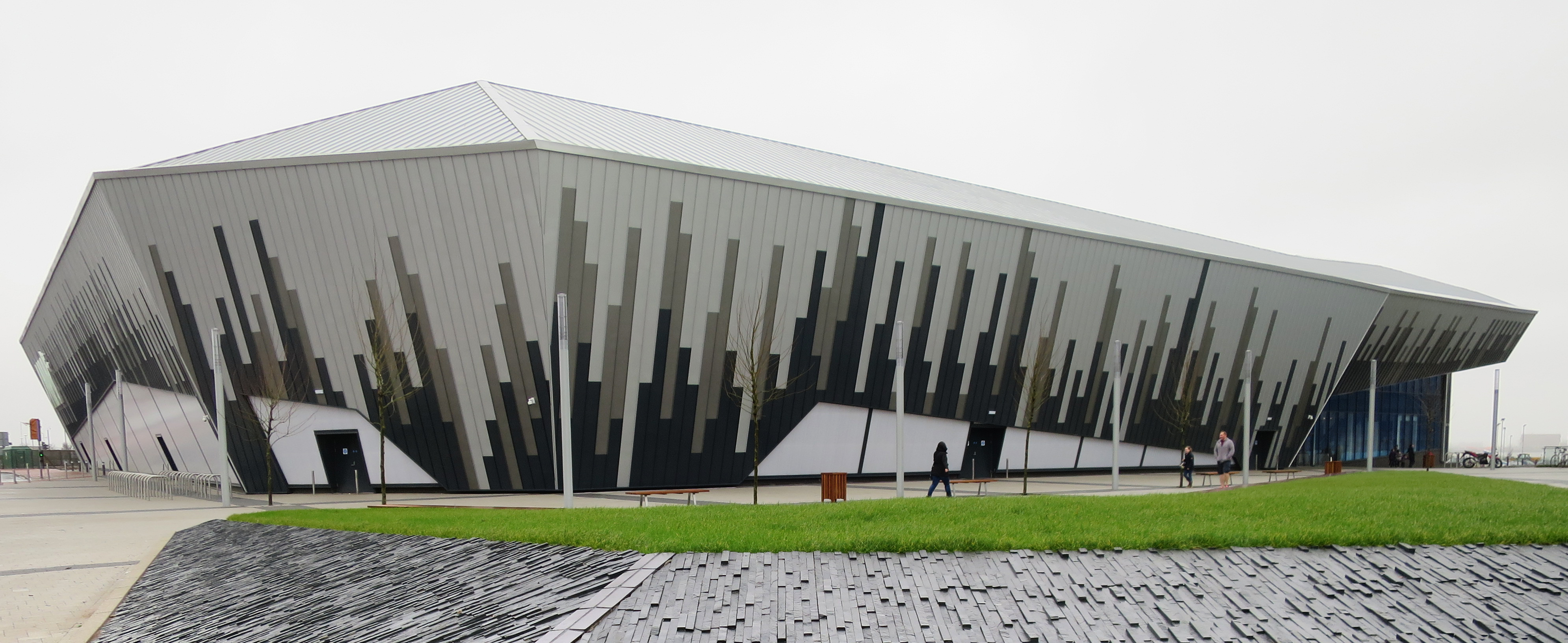
Ice Arena Wales, the home of the Cardiff Devils

The city's professional ice-hockey team, the Cardiff Devils (formed 1986), play against teams from across the UK in the Elite Ice Hockey League. The Devils played in the British Hockey League from 1987 to 1996, gaining promotion in two consecutive seasons—from Division 1 North, through Division 1—and remaining in the Premier division from the 1989–90 season, until the league's demise at the end of the 1995–96 season. The Cardiff Devils played in the Ice Hockey Superleague (known as the Sekonda Ice Hockey Superleague from 1998–99 due to sponsorship rights)—the top-level professional ice hockey league in the United Kingdom—between the 1995–96 season and 2000–01 season, when they were relegated to the British National League (BNL). Cardiff played in the (BNL) for two seasons before being promoted to the Elite Ice Hockey League at the end of the 2002–03 season, where they remain. The Devils' home venue moved from the Wales National Ice Rink to the Cardiff Arena in 2006, their temporary home in Cardiff Bay. The club moved to the Ice Arena Wales on 12 March 2016 during the 2015/16 season. Other ice hockey clubs playing at the arena include Cardiff Fire (EHL South 1), Cardiff Canucks (EHL South 2), Cardiff University Redhawks, Cardiff Eagles, Cardiff Comets Ladies and Cardiff Huskies Para Hockey.

=== Korfball ===
The Welsh Korfball Association (Cymdeithas Pêl-Corff Cymru) (founded 2002) (WKA) is the governing body for korfball in Wales. The WKA organises the Welsh National Korfball League. Cardiff has four korfball clubs: Cardiff City, Cardiff Met, Cardiff Raptors, and Cardiff University.

=== Netball ===
The Cardiff-based Cardiff Dragons are part of the Netball Superleague, which consists of the top netball teams in Wales, Scotland and England. Superleague teams members include international players from around the world. The teams compete against each other each week during the season, which runs from November to June. Seven of the 'Dragon's' nine home Superleague games are played at the Sport Wales National Centre, Cardiff City House of Sport, with the Cardiff Internatiinal Arena also used sporadically for games.

The Cardiff & District Netball League has six divisions. All league games are played at the Sport Wales National Centre.

The Welsh Netball Association (Cymdeithas Bêl-Rwyd Cymru) (founded 1945) (WNA) is the governing body for netball in Wales. The WNA is responsible for national championships, Welsh squad selection, international matches, the training and development of players, coaches and umpires and for the Sport Wales National Centre Netball Academy.

International competitions in which Wales compete include the European Championships, the Commonwealth Games and the Netball World Championships. Wales were European Champions in 2001. The World Youth Netball Championship was held in Cardiff in July 2000.

The Welsh Netball Association was a founder member of the International Federation of Netball Associations (IFNA)—which governs world netball—in 1960. Netball is played in over fifty countries. Wales' current IFNA world ranking is 16th (last updated 28 May 2009). The Welsh Netball Association is based in Pontcanna, Cardiff.

=== Rugby ===
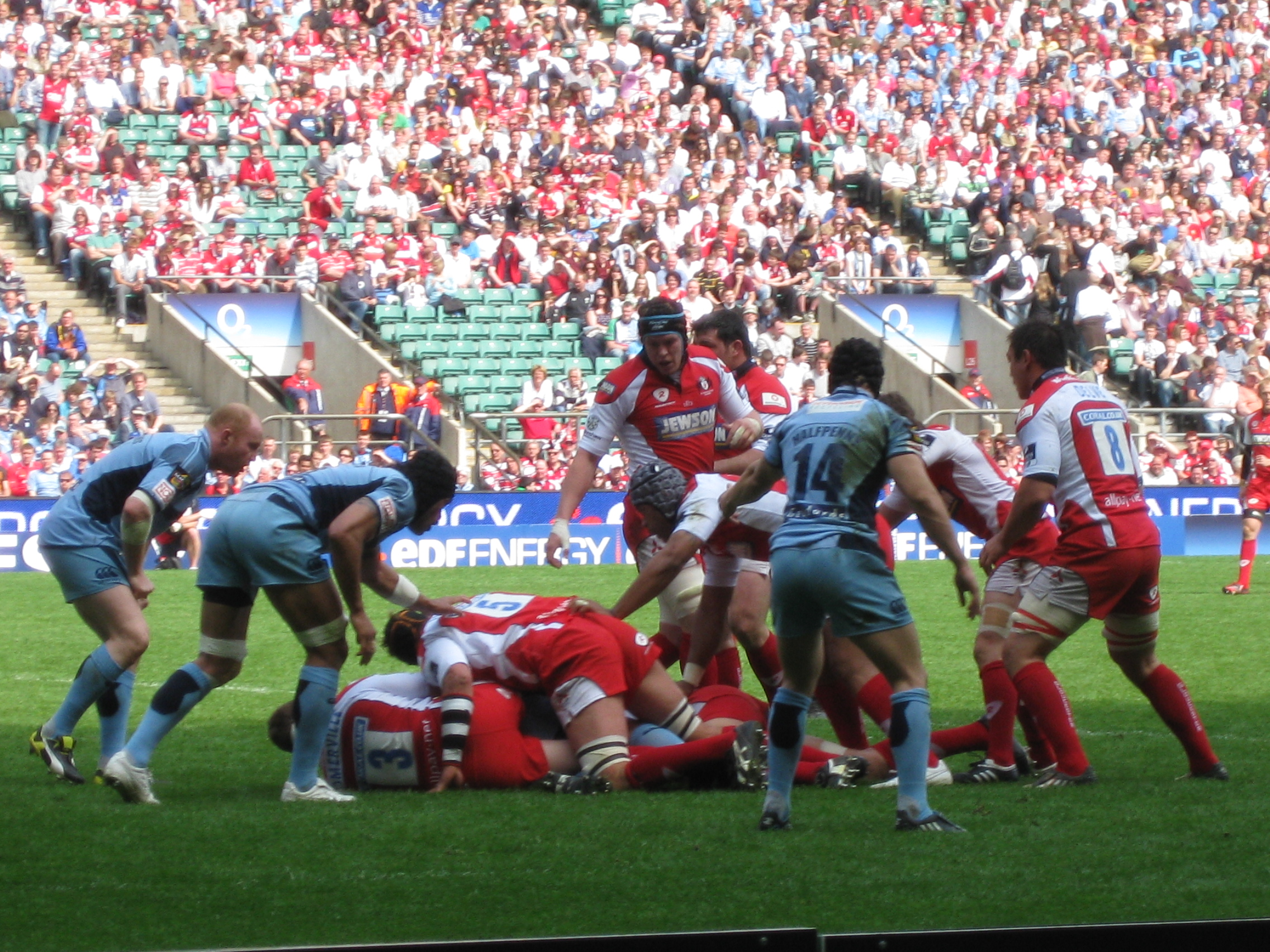
The Cardiff Blues during their win against Gloucester in the final of the 2008–09 EDF Energy Cup

The Cardiff Blues (Welsh: Gleision Caerdydd)—one of Wales' four professional, regional, rugby union teams—compete in the Pro14 (this league has included teams from the Celtic nations of Ireland, Scotland and Wales from its inception, and added teams from Italy in 2010 and from South Africa in 2017), the European Heineken Cup and the Anglo-Welsh LV= Cup, which they won in the 2008–09 season. The region played their home games at Cardiff Arms Park from their formation in 2003 until the end of the 2008–09 season, although some of their bigger games have been played at the Millennium Stadium. Cardiff Blues' moved to the Cardiff City Stadium, which they shared with Cardiff City F.C. In 2012 the club returned to playing their home matches at Cardiff Arms Park.

One of Cardiff's rugby union club sides play in the Welsh Premier Division: Cardiff RFC, founded in 1876, who continue to play their games at their Cardiff Arms Park stadium. Glamorgan Wanderers RFC (founded 1893) play in the western Cardiff suburb of Ely. Other Cardiff based rugby union teams include Rumney RFC, Rhiwbina RFC and Cardiff Metropolitan University RFC, (who play in WRU Division One East) as well as Llandaff North RFC, Llandaff RFC, Old Illtydians RFC, Fairwater RFC, Canton RFC, Caerau Ely RFC, Llanishen RFC, Clwb Rygbi Cymry Caerdydd, St. Peters RFC and WRU Division Five teams of St. Peters RFC, St. Albans RFC and St. Joseph's RFC. Whitchurch RFC, CIACS RFC, Llanrumney RFC and Tongwynlais RFC play in Division 6 Central C. Cardiff University RFC annually contest the Welsh Varsity Match with Swansea University RFC.

Cardiff's rugby league team, Cardiff City RLFC, play at Cardiff Arms Park in the Rugby League Conference Welsh Premier league.

Three Rugby Football League Challenge Cup finals were held at the Millennium Stadium (from the 2002–03 to 2004–05 seasons) while Wembley Stadium was being rebuilt. The other venues used, before the Challenge Cup final returned to Wembley, were Twickenham and Murrayfield.

=== Volleyball ===
Cardiff counts several volleyball clubs, including Cardiff Celts Volleyball Club.

== Individual sports ==
=== Athletics ===
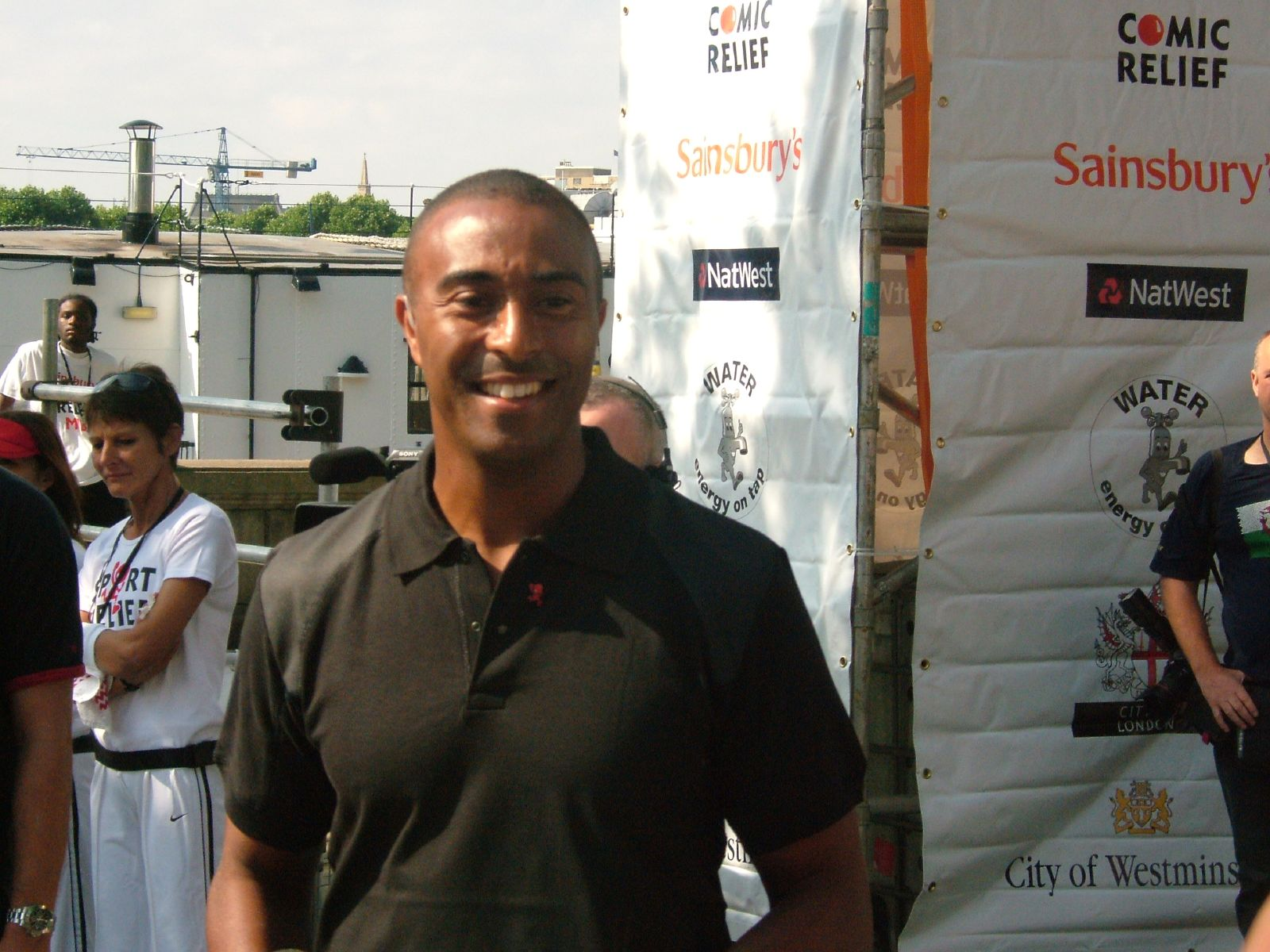
Colin Jackson

Cardiff Amateur Athletic Club (Cardiff AAC) (formed 1882 as Roath (Cardiff) Harriers) is based at the Cardiff International Sports Stadium, Leckwith. Roath Harriers shared Maindy Stadium with Birchgrove Harriers from its opening in 1951 and the two clubs amalgamated to form Cardiff Amateur Athletic Club in 1968. Cardiff AAC were British Athletics League champions in 1973, 1974 and 1975 and remain one of the top twelve clubs in Britain. The club is made up of five sections, each specialising in a separate sport: track and field; road running; cross country; mountain running; and road walking. Cardiff AAC athletes have won a total of 122 medals at major international championships: Olympic and Paralympic Games; World and European Championships; Commonwealth Games; and the World University Games.

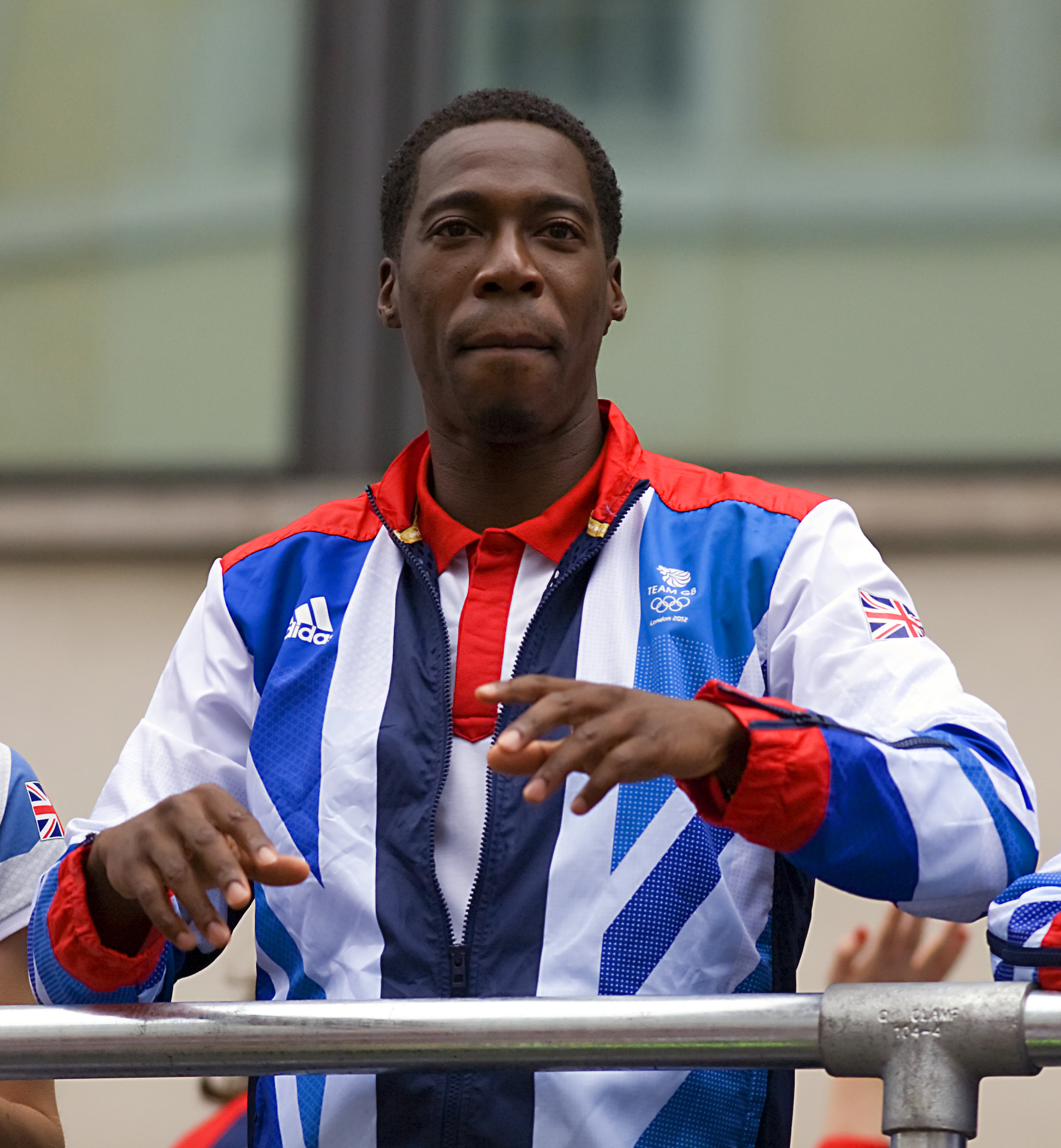
Christian Malcolm

Former and current Cardiff AAC athletes include: Lynn Davies (Lynn the Leap) (1964 Olympic Games gold medalist); Colin Jackson (1993 and 1999 World Championship gold medalist and 1988 Olympic Games silver medalist); Tanni Grey-Thompson (winner of 11 Olympic gold medals); Nigel Walker; Jamie Baulch (1996 Olympic Games and 2002 Commonwealth Games silver medalist and 1998 Commonwealth Games bronze medalist); Christian Malcolm (1998 Commonwealth Games silver medalist), (2010 European Athletics Championships silver medalist); and Matt Elias (1998 Commonwealth Games bronze medalist and 2002 Commonwealth Games silver medalist).

Cardiff Harlequins Running Club provide road running, cross country and mountain running sections. Harlequins have no track and field section.

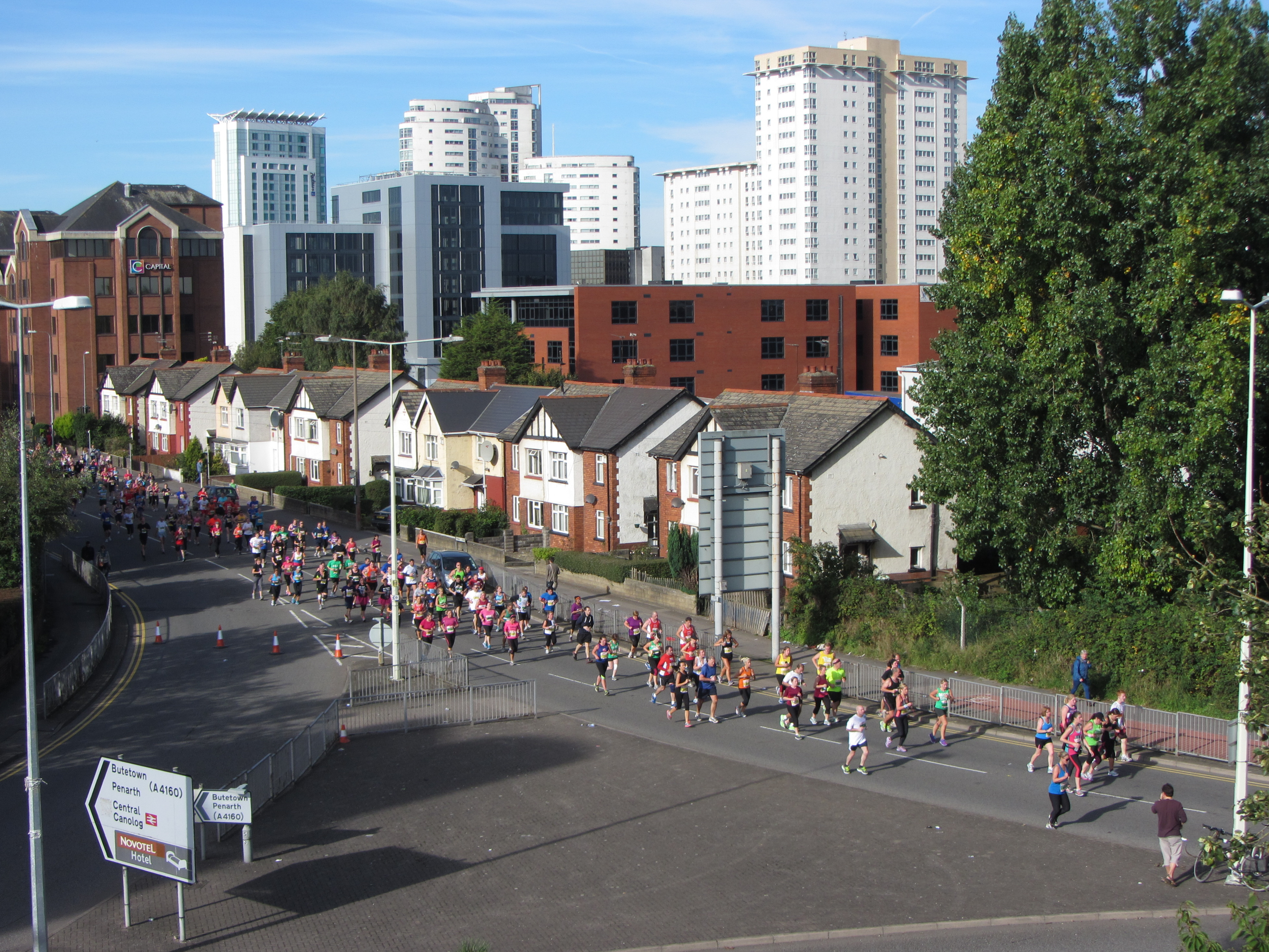
The 2013 Cardiff Half Marathon

The Cardiff Half Marathon takes place in the city each October, attracting up to 27,500 registered runners and 50,000 spectators annually. It is one of the largest road races in Great Britain and is organised by not-for-profit social enterprise Run 4 Wales. It has hosted the prestigious World (2016) Commonwealth (2018) British (2014/2015) and Welsh (Annually) Half Marathon Championships and holds a World Athletics Elite Road Race Label. The race is also a part of SuperHalfs, a series of leading international half marathon races including Lisbon, Prague, Berlin, Valencia and Copenhagen and attracts thousands of international participants each year.

Cardiff is also one of the cities chosen by several charities for sponsored runs such as Sport Relief, British Heart Foundation and Cancer Research UK and hosts popular road races including the Brecon Carreg Cardiff Bay 10K and CDF 10K.

Welsh Athletics (Athletau Cymru), the national governing body for athletics, has been based at the Cardiff International Sports Stadium since 2009, having been based at the Cardiff Athletics Stadium until the stadium was demolished in 2007.

=== Bowls ===
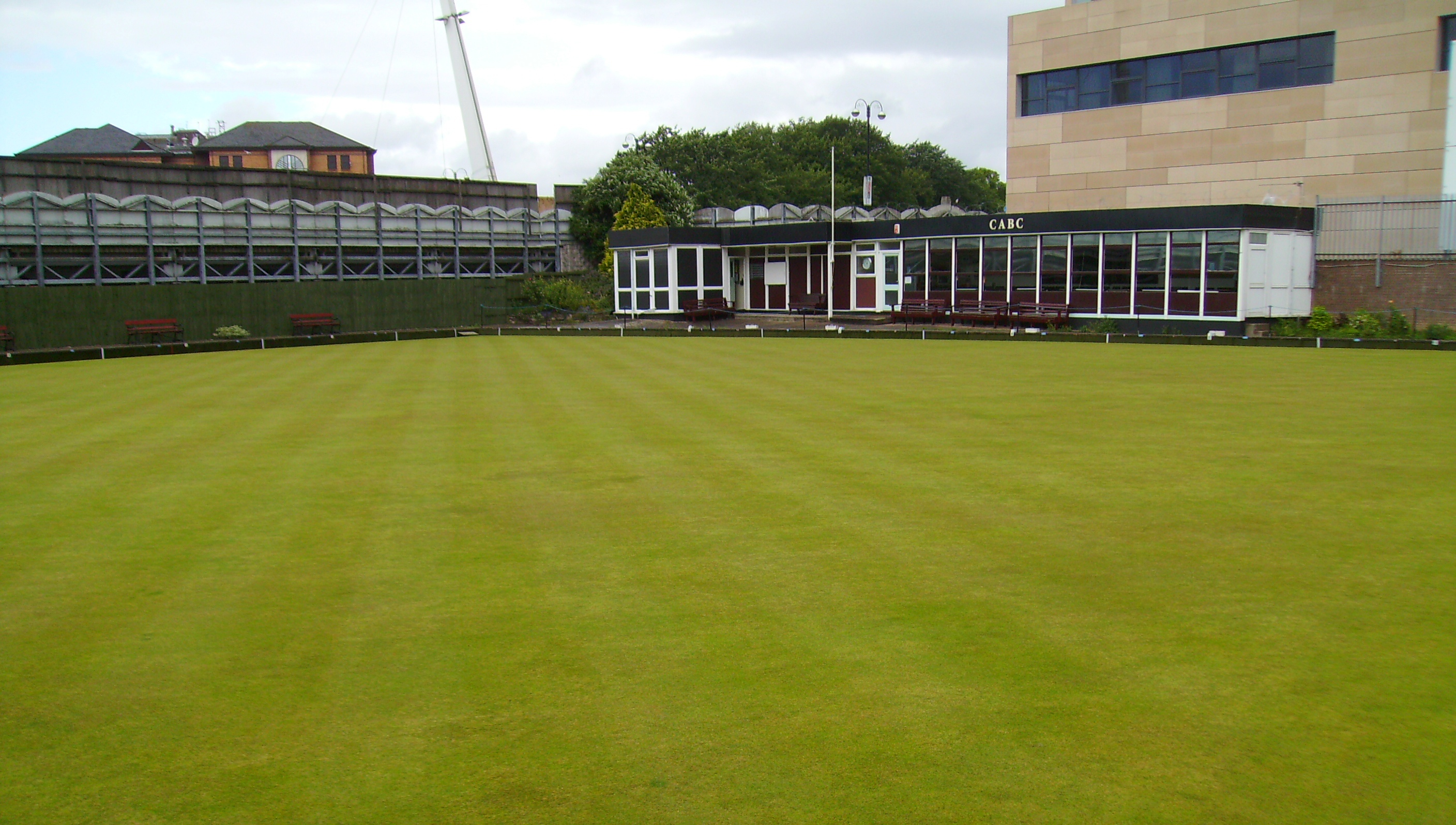
Cardiff Athletics Bowls Club

For administrative purposes, and for competitions immediately below national level in Wales, bowls (or bowling) is divided into counties. The South Glamorgan County Bowling Association (SGCBA) division follows the name of the preserved county of Wales that existed between 1972 and 1996. The SGCBA comprises 44 clubs, of which 30 are in the modern Cardiff county. The SGCBA play their home games at either Penylan, or at Llanbradach (in the modern Caerphilly County Borough). Bowling clubs are found throughout Cardiff. From clubs in the heart of the city, like the Cardiff Athletics Bowls Club at Cardiff Arms Park, to those in the western and northern rural areas like the St Fagans Bowls Club and the Pentyrch Bowling Club.

The Cardiff Indoor Bowling Club (founded 1984), affiliated to the Welsh Indoor Bowling Association (WIBA) and the Welsh Ladies Indoor Bowling Association, is at Sophia Gardens. The Cardiff club play in the Premier Division of the WIBA League and were WIBA club champions in the 2008/09 season, with a remarkable played 14, won 14 record. Cardiff's Jeff Webley won the Welsh Indoor Bowls title in 2001.

The Welsh Bowling Association (WBA), the governing body for men's outdoor bowling clubs in Wales, is based at Llanishen. It has 10 affiliated counties and 286 affiliated clubs. The WBA organise competitions, including the county championship, and select and manage the national side. At the 2009 Atlantic Rim Championship in Johannesburg, the Welsh men's team finished third.

=== Boxing ===
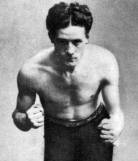
Jim Driscoll

Cardiff has a long association with boxing, from 'Peerless' Jim Driscoll – born in Cardiff in 1880 – to more recent, high-profile fights staged in the city. These include the WBC Lennox Lewis vs. Frank Bruno heavyweight championship fight at the Arms Park in 1993, and many of Joe Calzaghe's fights, between 2003 and 2007, including his victories over Mikkel Kessler – in the super middleweight reunification bout at the Millennium Stadium, Calzaghe retaining his WBO title and winning the WBA and WBC world titles from Kessler – and over Juan Carlos Giménez Ferreyra—retaining his WBO title at Cardiff Castle

The British Boxing Board of Control, the governing body of professional boxing in the United Kingdom, has its head office at The Old Library, Cardiff.

=== Cycling ===
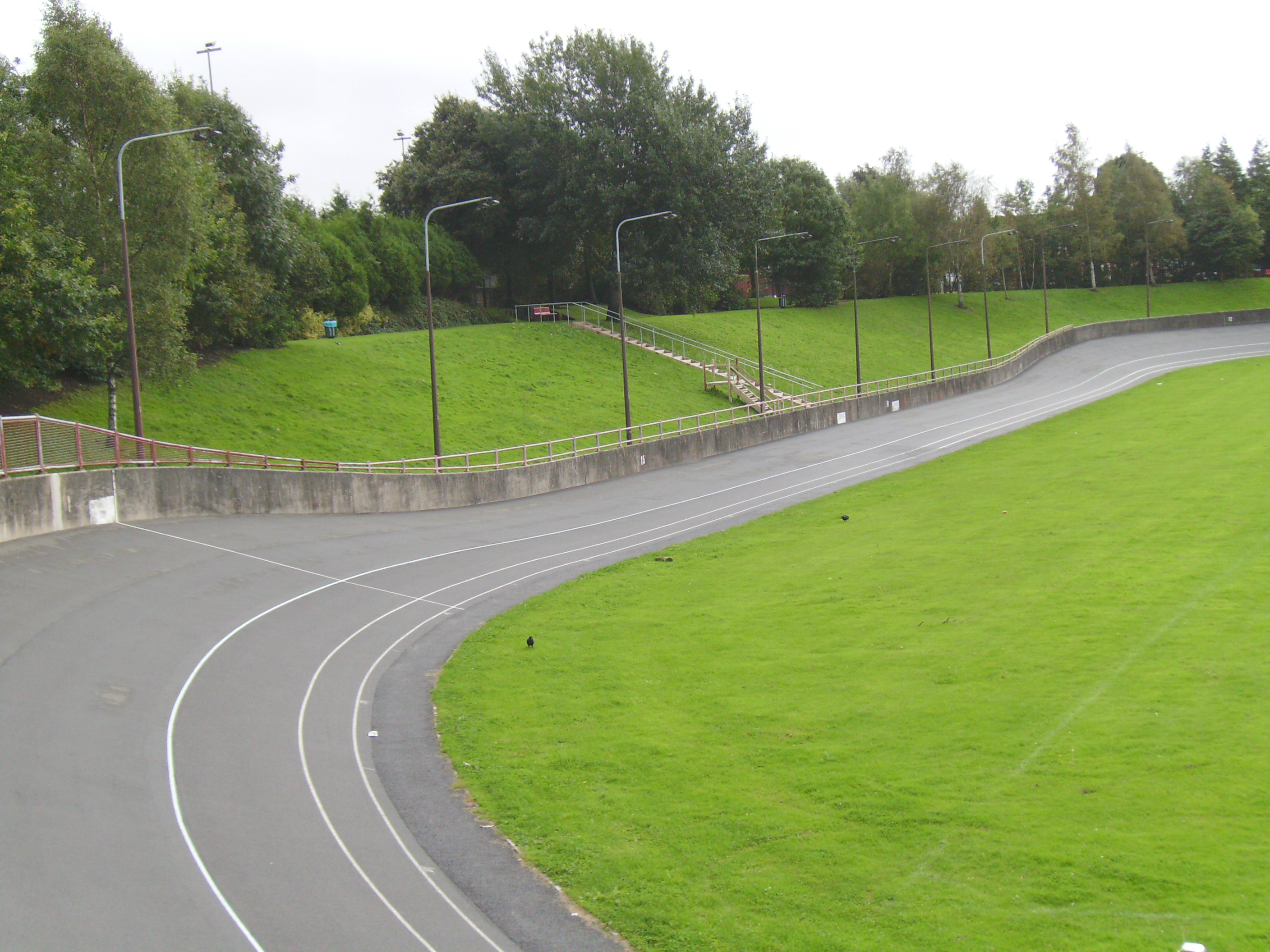
Maindy Cycle Track

The main cycling clubs in Cardiff are Cardiff Ajax CC, Cardiff JIF and Maindy Flyers Youth Cycling Club, all of which share the cycle track and facilities at the Maindy Centre. The clubs are administered by Welsh Cycling-Beicio Cymru and cover all the usual disciplines – BMX; cyclo-cross; mountain biking (downhill and cross-country); road racing; time trials; track racing; and leisure cycling.

Cardiff Ajax CC (founded 1948), named after the Greek mythical hero (Ajax), spans almost all the cycling disciplines. The club has strong links with the Maindy Flyers. Former club riders include Reg Braddick (1944 British National Road Race Champion), Sally Hodge (1988 UCI Track Cycling World Champion), Katie Curtis (2007 Welsh National Road Race Champion) and Nicole Cooke (2008 Beijing Olympic gold medalist, World Cup winner 2003 and 2006, ten times British National Road Race Champion, and 2002 Commonwealth Games gold medalist).

The Cardiff JIF – standing for 'Just in Front' – cycling club is involved in road, track, cross and mountain bike racing. Former club riders include Geraint Thomas (2008 Beijing Olympic gold medalist) and Ian Jeremiah (Welsh cross-country Champion).

Maindy Flyers (founded 1995) are a youth cycling club, open to those aged between five and sixteen years old. In addition to racing bikes on a track, the club also organise mountain biking and cyclo-cross. Former club riders include Geraint Thomas, a club member before joining Cardiff JIF, Luke Rowe and Matthew Rowe.

A large number of Spokes Cycle Touring Club's 70 members are based in Cardiff. The club organises day, weekend, week and venture rides, around the UK and in Europe.

Cycling is permitted in many of Cardiff's parks and green spaces and there are designated cycle routes throughout the county. One of the main routes in Cardiff linking to the rest of the Welsh cycle network is the Taff Trail (Taith Taf). The trail is a mainly off-road cycle and foot path that follows the Taff valley (Cwm Taf), much of it along the riverbank, between Mermaid Quay, Cardiff Bay in the south, and the market town of Brecon in the north. The Taff Trail leaves Cardiff County just north west of Tongwynlais, where it enters Rhondda Cynon Taf. The trail, 55 miles (89 km) long, is part of the 250 miles (400 km) Lôn Las Cymru cycle route, running from Holyhead to Cardiff and Chepstow – Route 8 of the National Cycle Network.

=== Fencing ===
Cardiff Fencing Club, based at the Sport Wales National Centre, Sophia Gardens, is the oldest fencing club in Wales. It is affiliated to Welsh Fencing and British Fencing. The club train students at épée, sabre and foil.

Russell Swords Fencing Club also meets in Cardiff at the Star Centre, Splott, and trains students in all three weapons.

Welsh Fencing, the governing body of fencing in Wales, is based in Canton, Cardiff. In 2003 it had 34 affiliated clubs, 260 adult and 559 junior members. Welsh Fencing organises competitions including the Welsh Open. Welsh Fencing are responsible for the selection and management of the Wales representative squad, who compete in the Winton Cup and the Commonwealth Games. To compete at the European and World Championships Welsh fencers represent Great Britain, if selected.

=== Golf ===
Cardiff has several golf courses, including:

Cardiff Golf Club (founded 1922) opened the first 18-hole golf course in Cardiff in 1923, in Cyncoed. The course is 6,099 yards (5,577 m), well bunkered, and set in parkland. A new clubhouse was completed in 1998 and officially opened by John Roger Jones, President of the Welsh Golfing Union, in 1999.

Castell Coch Golf Club has a nine-hole, par three, 1,200 yards (1,100 m), pitch and putt course in Tongwynlais, opened in 1988.

Creigiau Golf Club has an 18-hole, 6,063 yards (5,544 m), parkland course. The course is flat, allowing easy walking, with plenty of water hazards.

Llanishen Golf Club has an 18-hole, 5,301 yards (4,847 m), parkland course, built in 1995.

Radyr Golf Club (established 1902) has an 18-hole, 6,010 yards (5,500 m), public course, built by Harry Colt.

St Mellons Golf Club has an 18-hole 6,275 yards (5,738 m), parkland course in St Mellons (first opened in 1936), laid out in the shape of a clover leaf. Part of the course is in Cardiff and part in Newport and, as the clubhouse is in Newport, the club is affiliated to the Gwent Golfing Union.

Whitchurch (Cardiff) Golf Club has an 18-hole, parkland, 6,258 yards (5,722 m), public course, built in 1914. The course was voted Best Inland Golf Course in Wales, in a survey by Welsh Club Golfer Magazine, in November 2008.

=== Gymnastics ===
Cardiff Olympic Gymnastics Club, founded in 1948 as a ladies artistic gymnastics club, opened a boys section in September 1999. It is the oldest established and 'most senior' ladies artistic gymnastics club in Wales. The club, based in Grangetown, has over 400 members. The Girls Gymnastics section compete on four pieces of apparatus: asymmetric bars; beam; floor; and vault. The Boys Gymnastics section compete on six pieces: floor; vault; pommel horse; still rings; parallel bars; and high bar.

Welsh Gymnastics (founded 1902 as the Welsh Amateur Gymnastics Association), based at the Sport Wales National Centre, is the national governing body for gymnastics in Wales. It has overall responsibility for the administration of all eight gymnastics disciplines in Wales – women's artistic, men's artistic and rhythmic gymnastics, general gymnastics, sports acrobatics, sports aerobics, trampolining and tumbling – through its four geographical areas (north, south, east and west), which are responsible for their own area competition and squad training sessions. Welsh Gymnastics organises the Welsh national and international teams and competitions.

=== Horse Racing ===
Ely Racecourse was a major horse racing venue in Ely, Cardiff, pulling in crowds of 40,000 or more for events such as the Welsh Grand National – first held at Ely in 1895. Ely Racecourse closed on 27 April 1939, the last race being won by Keith Piggott (father of Lester) on Dunbarney.

=== Judo ===
Cardiff has five judo clubs affiliated to the Welsh Judo Association: Honto Judo, based at the Heath (Y Mynydd Bychan); Ty-Celyn Judo Club, based at Cardiff High School, Cyncoed; WISP Sogo Judokai, based at Penylan; Kings Monkton Judokai, based at Kings Monkton School, West Grove, Roath (Y Rath); and Cardiff Judo club based at Sport Wales National Centre.

The Welsh Judo Association (Cymdeithas Judo Cymru) (WJA), based at the Sport Wales National Centre, Sophia Gardens, is the governing body for judo in Wales. The WJA is responsible for managing the Welsh High Class Performance Squads, from which the National Coach – double judo Olympic silver medallist Neil Adams – selects the Welsh national team to compete at international events.

=== Rowing ===
Returning from World War II, members of the Taff Rowing Club (founded 1879) and Cardiff Rowing Club (founded 1884) discovered their clubhouses to have collapsed and burned out. The two clubs amalgamated to form the Llandaff Rowing Club, based on the River Taff, at Llandaff, in 1946. After restoration work to boats and clubhouse, the club's first regatta was held in 1947. Club members have been medal winners at the 1962 Empire Games in Australia and the 1980 Moscow Olympics. The club has a course of 1,200 metres (3,937 ft) of calm water on the River Taff. Llandaff Rowing Club is affiliated to the Welsh Amateur Rowing Association (WARA).

Cardiff City Rowing Club (CCRC) is based at Channel View and is also affiliated to (WARA). Founded in 2004 by ex-Welsh squad rowers, CCRC has easy access to mile after mile of flat water, including the Rivers Ely and Taff – with access to the stretch of water up to Sophia Gardens, past Cardiff Castle and the Millennium Stadium – back to the whole of Cardiff Bay and the club's multilane rowing course there. Funding by Sport Wales has enabled CCRC to develop its facilities, boat fleet and local community rowing.

The Welsh Amateur Rowing Association (Rhwyfo Cymru) (WARA), based at Thornhill, is the national governing body for rowing in Wales. It is responsible for the organisation of all national rowing competitions held in Wales, including the 'Head of the Taff' and the Welsh Open Rowing Championships, and for the selection and management of the Welsh national rowing teams and the organisation of all international rowing competitions held in Wales. It has 13 affiliated clubs, including schools and universities.

=== Sailing ===
Cardiff has a long history of sailing, with the city host to two Yacht Clubs:

- Cardiff Bay Yacht Club (CBYC) http://www.cbyc.co.uk (founded 1932) was founded as Penarth Motor Boat and Sailing Club, but changed to Cardiff Bay Yacht Club in 1999. The club sits within Cardiff's International Sports Village and boats an extensive pontoon system, moorings and two slipways. Activities include yacht racing, yacht cruising, dinghy sailing, dinghy racing and fishing, CBYC is also an RYA training centre for powerboating and sailing courses offering various courses in powerboating and dinghy sailing inc race training in optimists and toppers up to double hander advanced dinghies, which are very popular to enable people to learn to sail and drive powerboats, and is one of the largest yacht clubs in the united kingdom, and the largest yacht club in Wales, Cardiff Sea cadets are berthed there. CBYC also hosts the famous Shanghai Cup yacht race.
- Cardiff Yacht Club (CYC) (founded 1900) has a clubhouse in Butetown, Cardiff Bay, complete with moorings, a pontoon system and a slipway.

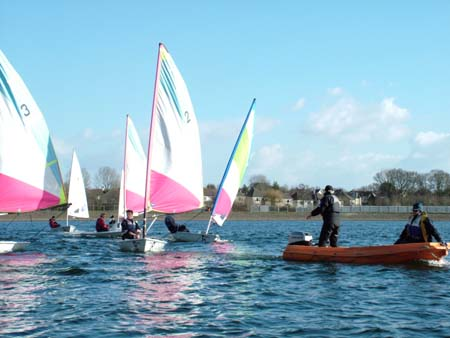
Tuition at Cardiff Sailing Centre

Royal Yachting Association recognised sail training is provided by a number of providers in Cardiff, with Cardiff Sailing Centre, a local authority run facility being the main provider, who have been providing RYA sail training in Cardiff since 1974. CBYC offer tuition to both club members & the public.

Cardiff also hosts a number of national and international sailing events, from youth championships and BUCS fleet championships to the Extreme Sailing Series since 2012 and the 2017–18 Volvo Ocean Race.

=== Shooting ===
The Welsh Target Shooting Federation (Ffederasiwn Saethu Targedau Cymru) (WTSF), based in Cardiff, is the governing body for shooting sports in Wales. It represents the member bodies of the WTSF—the Welsh Airgun Association (WAA), the Welsh Clay Target Shooting Association (WCTSA), the Welsh Rifle Association (WRA) and the Welsh Small-bore Rifle Association (WSRA)—by promoting and developing shooting sports in Wales. Cardiff Rifle Club (primarily a .22 smallbore rifle club) is also based in the Roath/Cathays area of the city.

=== Skiing ===
The Ski & Snowboard Centre Cardiff, Fairwater – managed by Snowsport Cymru/Wales – consists of a floodlit 100 metres (328 ft) dry ski slope, with an overhead poma ski lift and lubrication roller, to ensure good skiing and snowboarding conditions—even in dry weather.

Snowsport Cymru/Wales, based at the Cardiff Ski & Snowboard Centre, is the governing body of skiing and snowboarding in Wales. Its membership comprises individuals, schools, corporate sponsors and six affiliated clubs. Snowsport Cymru/Wales selects, organises and trains the Welsh National Ski Squad.

=== Speedway ===
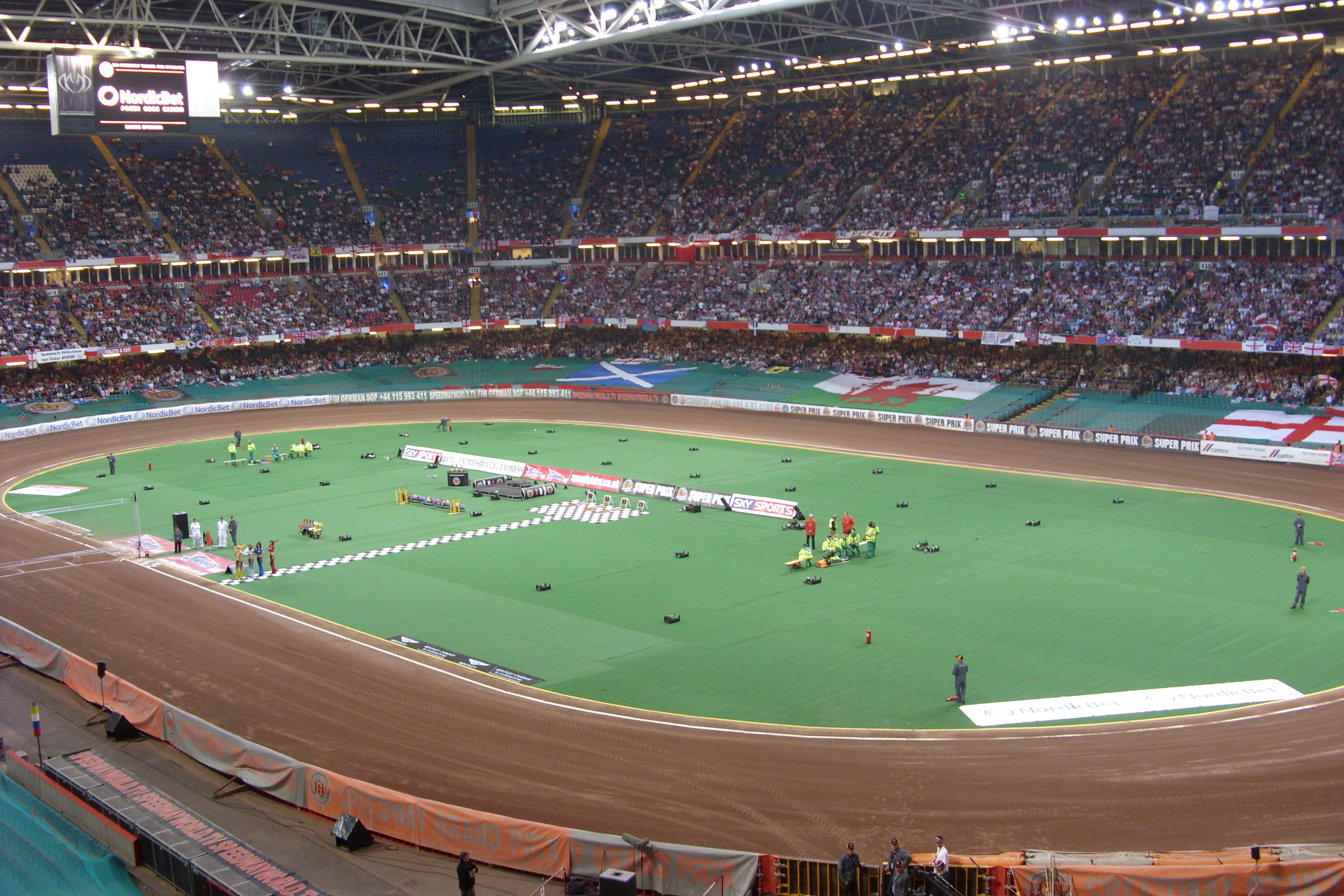
Grand Prix of Great Britain at the Millennium Stadium

Speedway was staged at Cardiff's White City Greyhound Stadium from 1928 until World War II. The sport returned to the city in 1951, at a purpose built stadium in Penarth Road but the track closed mid season 1953. The team, known as the Cardiff Dragons, raced in the National League Division Three in 1951 and in the Southern League in 1952. Speedway returned to the city in 2001, when the British Speedway Grand Prix, one of the World Championship events, moved into the Millennium Stadium. While the track—a temporary, purpose built, shale oval—is not universally loved, the venue is considered the best of the World Championship's 11 rounds.

=== Swimming ===
The Wales Empire Pool was demolished in 1998 to make way for the Millennium Stadium. The replacement pool, the Cardiff International Pool was opened on 12 January 2008 in Grangetown as part of the International Sports Village. The complex features a 50-metre Olympic standard pool and an indoor water park. In addition, 25-metre swimming pools are located in seven city leisure centres.

=== Triathlon ===
Cardiff has two triathlon clubs. One senior, one junior club: (1) Cardiff Triathletes, based at Fairwater Leisure Centre – affiliated to British Triathlon, Welsh Triathlon and the Road Time Trials Council (for cycling time trials) – (2) The junior and youth triathlon club is the Cardiff Junior Triathlon Club (Clwb Triathlon Ieuenctid Caerdydd), based at the Maindy Centre. Both senior and junior clubs participate in triathlon, duathlon and aquathlon events in South Wales and beyond. The Cardiff Junior Triathlon is held annually, in June.

=== World Rally Championship ===
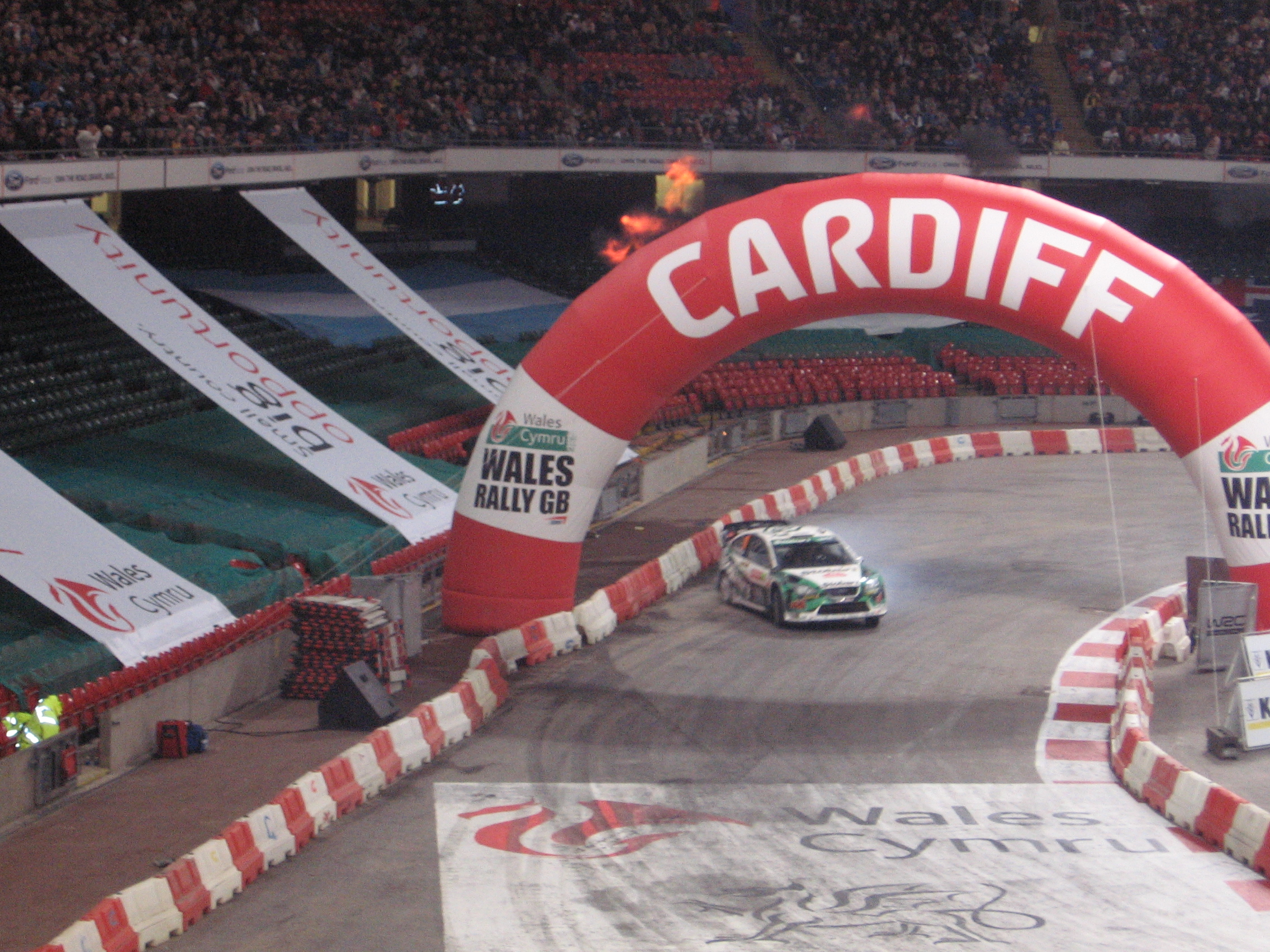
Wales Rally GB inside the Millennium Stadium

Motorsport events such as the Wales Rally GB, as part of the World Rally Championship are hosted by the Millennium Stadium. The first ever indoor special stages of the World Rally Championship were held at the Stadium in September 2005 and have been an annual event since then. However, the event scheduled to start on 22 October 2009 could be the last to be seen there, as the Welsh Assembly Government has withdrawn its funding, following the decision by Fédération Internationale de l'Automobile that Wales Rally GB would not have World Rally Championship qualifying status in 2010.

== Multi-sport and international events ==
=== British Empire and Commonwealth Games ===
The 1958 British Empire and Commonwealth Games – now called the Commonwealth Games – hosted by Cardiff, were held between 18 and 26 July 1958. The Games involved 1,130 athletes from 35 national teams competing in 94 events.

The main stadium for the event was the National Stadium part of Cardiff Arms Park, which hosted the track and field events. The Wales Empire Swimming Pool, which also opened in 1958, hosted all the swimming and diving events. The Wales Empire Pool and the National Stadium were demolished in 1998 to make way for the Millennium Stadium. Of the venues used for the event, only the cycling track at Maindy Centre remains.

=== London 2012 Olympics ===
Cardiff played a substantial role in the London 2012 Olympics, with the Millennium Stadium hosting some events. Venues in Cardiff used by athletes training for the Olympics included:

- Cardiff International Sports Stadium – Athletics
- Cardiff Central Youth Club – Rhythmic Gymnastics, Artistic Gymnastics, Trampoline
- Cardiff Harbour Authority – Rowing, Canoe Flatwater, Sailing, Canoe/Kayak Flatwater
- Cardiff City House of Sport – Artistic Gymnastics
- Cardiff International Sports Village – Athletics, Swimming
- Cardiff University – Archery, Basketball, Handball, Indoor Volleyball
- Football Association of Wales National Training Facility – Football
- Maindy Stadium – Track Cycling
- University of Wales Institute, Cardiff – Archery, Athletics, Fencing, Taekwondo
- Sport Wales National Centre – Badminton, Basketball, Boxing, Fencing, Football, Rhythmic Gymnastics, Artistic Gymnastics, Trampoline, Hockey, Judo, Table Tennis, Taekwondo, Weightlifting
- Western Leisure Centre – Fencing.

=== Commonwealth Games 2022 ===
Cardiff submitted a bid to host the Commonwealth Games in 2022 (but failed being beaten by Birmingham) having been the host city of the 1958 British Empire and Commonwealth Games.

== See also ==
- Sport in Wales
