= Wales National Ice Rink =

Sports venue in Cardiff, Wales

- The venue seen before demolition
- Interactive map of Wales National Ice Rink
- Location: Cardiff, Wales
- Coordinates: 51.477621°N 3.173719°W
- Capacity: 2,700 (ice hockey)

Construction
- Opened: September 1986
- Closed: June 2006
- Demolished: September 2006
- Architects: Alex Robertson, Peter Francis & Partners

Tenant
- Cardiff Devils

Wales National Ice Rink (WNIR) was an ice rink in Cardiff, Wales. It had a capacity of 2,700 for ice hockey and was the former home of the Cardiff Devils ice hockey team. It was opened in September 1986, and was inaugurated by Sarah, Duchess of York on 27 April 1987.

The WNIR was also used for professional boxing events and occasionally as a concert venue. It was demolished in September 2006 to make way for expansion of the St David's, Cardiff Shopping Centre, with the site now occupied by department store John Lewis.

== Music events ==
Artists and bands that have performed at the venue include The Alarm, Status Quo, Blur, Wet Wet Wet, Faith No More, Chris de Burgh, Extreme, Madness, The Brian May Band, Orchestral Manoeuvres in the Dark, The Prodigy and Deacon Blue. During the Kiss concert on 20 May 1992, as part of their Revenge Tour, a pyro cue for "Heaven's on Fire" caused £20,000 worth of damage to the ceiling. Meat Loaf performed here on 4 December 1993 as part of the Everything Louder Tour to a crowd of 4,300.

== Closure ==
In April 2006, the final ice hockey game hosted at the location was a special "End Of An Era" game featuring former Devils players against the 2005/2006 Devils squad. The facility later closed to leisure skaters in June 2006. Following the closure, the temporary Cardiff Bay Ice Rink was constructed at the Cardiff International Sports Village within the Cardiff Bay area of Cardiff, which was used to host Devil's home games until the opening of Ice Arena Wales in March 2016.

== See also ==
- Sport in Cardiff
