= John Brownrigg =

John Brownrigg may refer to:

- John Brownrigg (architect) (1911–2002), British architect
- John Studholme Brownrigg (1786–1853), English merchant and politician
