= Joanna Read =

British theatre director and librettist

Joanna Read (born 8 March 1968) is a British theatre director and librettist. In 2010, she became the first ever female Principal of the London Academy of Music and Dramatic Art (LAMDA).

== Early life ==
Read was born on 8 March 1968 in Stroud. She attended a comprehensive secondary school and went on to read drama at Bristol University from 1986 to 1989, directing her first few productions whilst doing her degree.

== Career ==
Having worked on the fringe and at Sheffield in her early years (occasionally in stage management, although she also participated in the Channel 4 Regional Directors Programme), she soon joined the Education team at the Young Vic for a year. Following that became the Head of Education and Participation at the Birmingham Repertory Theatre from 1993 to 1997, where she created a successful and wide-ranging education and outreach strategy and commissioned and directed new writing.

She then became an Associate Director of the Octagon Theatre Bolton from 1997 and then went on to become Chief Executive and Artistic Director of the Salisbury Playhouse from 1999 to 2007. Under her leadership, the Playhouse became one of the leading regional producing theatres of the last decade. She steered the theatre to a position of financial stability, while also leading a successful major capital development programme. Productions directed at Salisbury included the UK premiere of Arthur Miller's Playing For Time with Joanna Riding, Shadowlands with Julian Glover and The Hired Man by Howard Goodall and Melvyn Bragg. She has also worked as a freelance director and writer for Edinburgh Festival Theatre, the Young Vic London, the New Vic Theatre in Newcastle Under Lyme, The Watermill West Berkshire Playhouse, The Mill at Sonning and the Watford Palace Theatre, amongst others. As a librettist, her works include a musical version of Charles Dickens' A Tale of Two Cities, for which Howard Goodall composed the music.

Between June 2010 and December 2018 she was the Principal of LAMDA. Read was the first female principle of LAMDA and she completed their £29 million new building which went on to earn a RIBA London Award 2019 and a RIBA National Award 2019.

Ms Read joined the Yvonne Arnaud Theatre, Guildford as Theatre Director and Chief Executive in January 2019.

== Personal life ==
Joanna Read is married to TV producer Nick Pitt. The couple have two children: Poppy Read-Pitt and Millicent Read-Pitt.
