= Ice Arena Wales =

Ice hockey venue in Cardiff, Wales

Vindico Arena

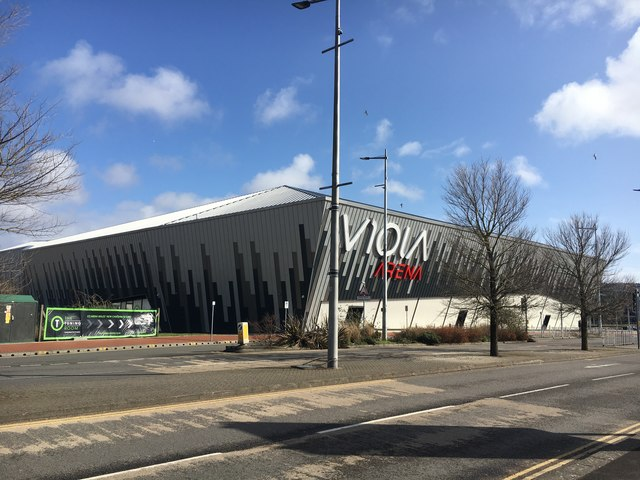
- Vindico Arena (as the Viola Arena) in March 2020
- Interactive map of Vindico Arena
- Former names: Ice Arena Wales (2016–2018, 2020–2023); Viola Arena (2018—2020)
- Address: Olympian Dr; Cardiff; CF11 0JS
- Location: Cardiff International Sports Village, Cardiff Bay
- Coordinates: 51°27′02″N 3°10′54″W
- Capacity: 3,250

Construction
- Groundbreaking: 29 May 2014
- Opened: 12 March 2016
- Cost: £17M (approximately)
- Architect: Scott Brownrigg
- Structural engineer: Arup
- Main contractor: Kier Group

Tenant
- Cardiff Devils (2016–present)

Website
- www.vindicoarena.com

Ice Arena Wales (Welsh: Canolfan Iâ Cymru; known as Vindico Arena for sponsorship reasons) is an ice hockey rink in the Cardiff International Sports Village in Cardiff, Wales. It opened on 12 March 2016, and had two ice rinks and seating for 3,250 spectators. The ice rink currently only has the use of one rink, with the smaller public pad leased out by Cardiff Council to Sayers.

It is home to the Cardiff Devils ice hockey team, who play in the professional British Elite Ice Hockey League, which is the top tier of ice hockey in the UK. It replaced the Cardiff Arena, which was close to the current site. The Cardiff Arena (affectionately named the Big Blue Tent) was a temporary structure, built after the Wales National Ice Rink was demolished in September 2006. The Cardiff Devils played their first game at the arena against Belfast Giants on 12 March 2016.

== History ==
=== Construction ===
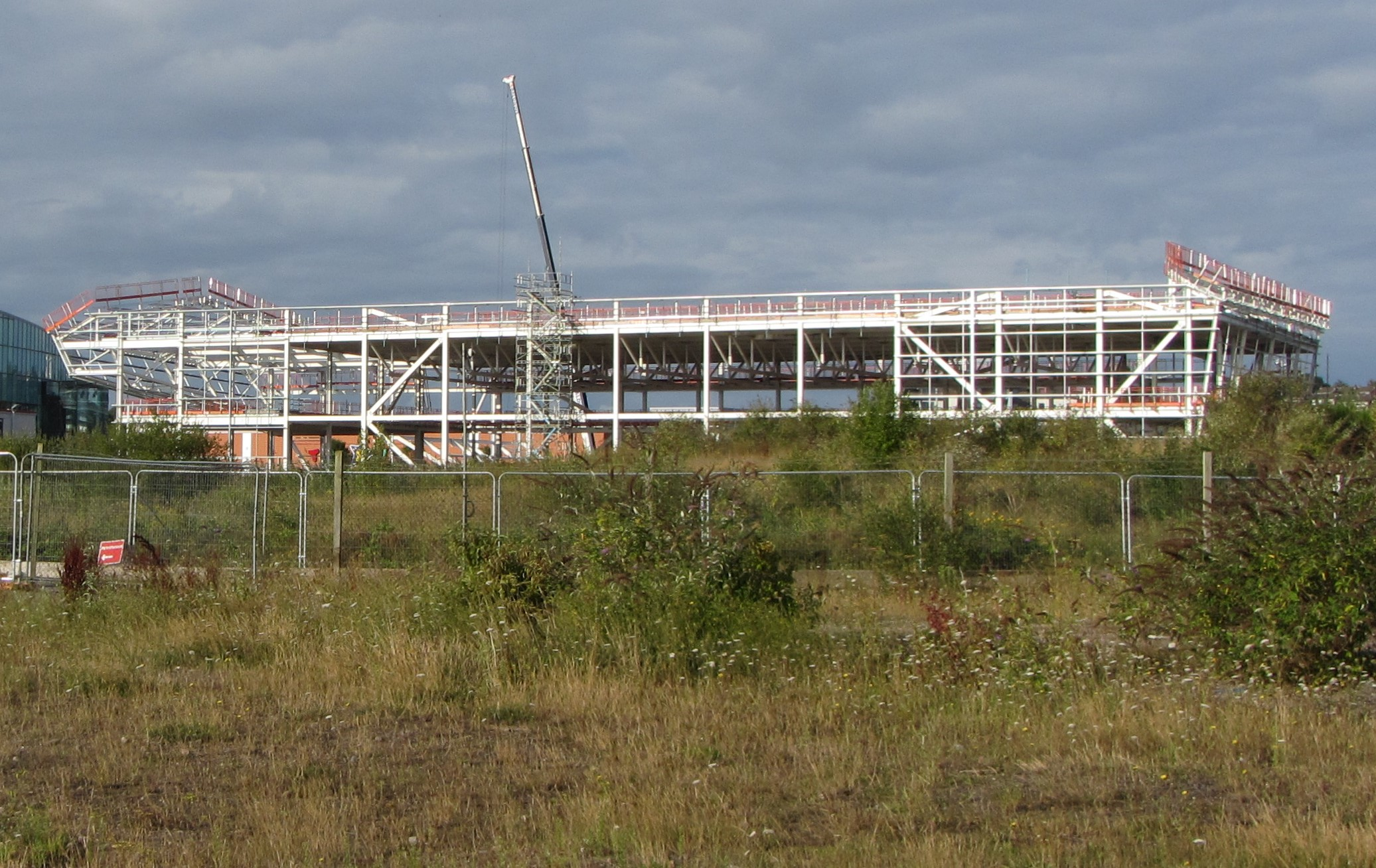
The arena during construction in August 2014

Cardiff Council had named the operator Planet Ice as the company they had chosen to build a new ice rink to replace the Cardiff Arena, which is a temporary structure in the Cardiff International Sports Village. Work was due to begin in early 2011, subject to planning, with the ice arena to be completed by February 2012. Planet Ice would have run the rink as well as design and build it.

However, by July 2011, Cardiff Council said in statement "We were unable to find the comfort that we required from them to show the ice rink would now be progressed. As a result, it is being recommended that the executive cancels the current tender. Instead it is proposed to deliver a new ice arena, as a priority, within a new waterfront tender which would go out this summer." The contract to build the arena was eventually won by the Wigan-based developers, Greenbank Partnerships. The cost of the arena was approximately £16 – £17 million and was meant to form part of a larger £250M development, including a 32-storey indoor ski slope, a hotel and apartments, and viewing platform, but much of this was later cancelled.

=== Opening ===
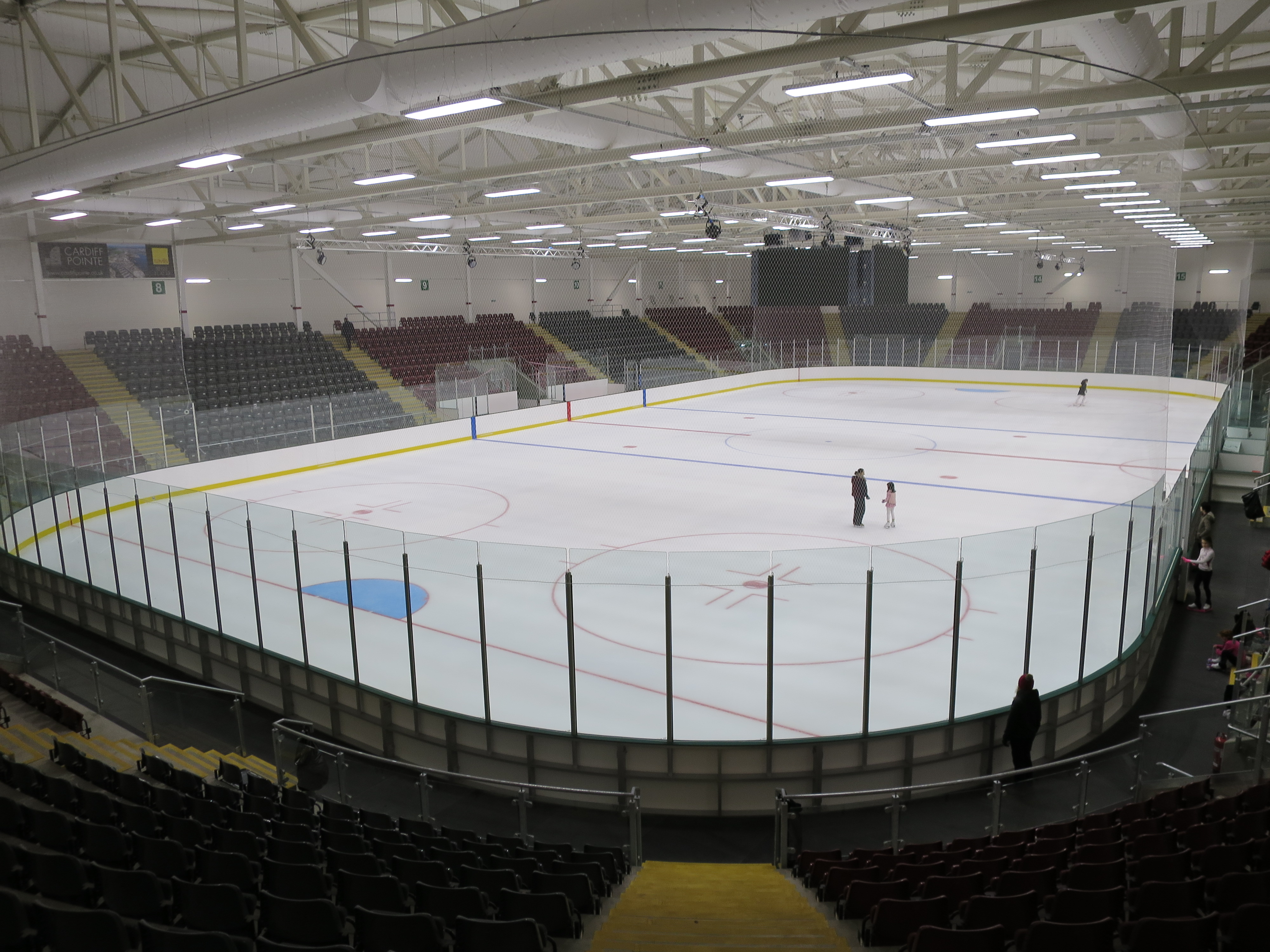
Inside the Ice Arena Wales in February 2016

The last game in the Cardiff Arena (also known as the Big Blue Tent) was played against Coventry Blaze on 27 February 2016. The first game in Ice Arena Wales was against Belfast Giants on 12 March 2016, with the first goal scored by Joey Martin during the second period at 31:34 time played. Joey would also score the second goal at 33:37 on the way to a 5-2 Cardiff victory for the first match at the arena.

== Events ==
=== Boxing ===
The IAW has also hosted boxing on three occasions, the first being on 16 July 2016.

=== MMA ===
The IAW has hosted 3 Cage Warriors events, starting with Cage Warriors 97 on 29 September 2018. Cage Warriors 100, and Cage Warriors 104 were also held at the Ice Arena Wales, on 8 December 2018 and 27 April 2019 respectively.

== Naming rights ==
In November 2018, the venue was renamed the Viola Arena, after a five-year naming rights deal was signed with Bridgend based financial institution, Viola. The name reverted to Ice Arena Wales in August 2020, after Viola went into liquidation. Vindico, a south Wales based technology company, announced in May 2023 a "six-figure, five-year deal" for the venue's naming rights, renaming the venue the Vindico Arena.

== See also ==
- Sport in Cardiff
