= Cardiff Arena =

Temporary ice rink in Cardiff, Wales

- Cardiff Bay Ice Arena
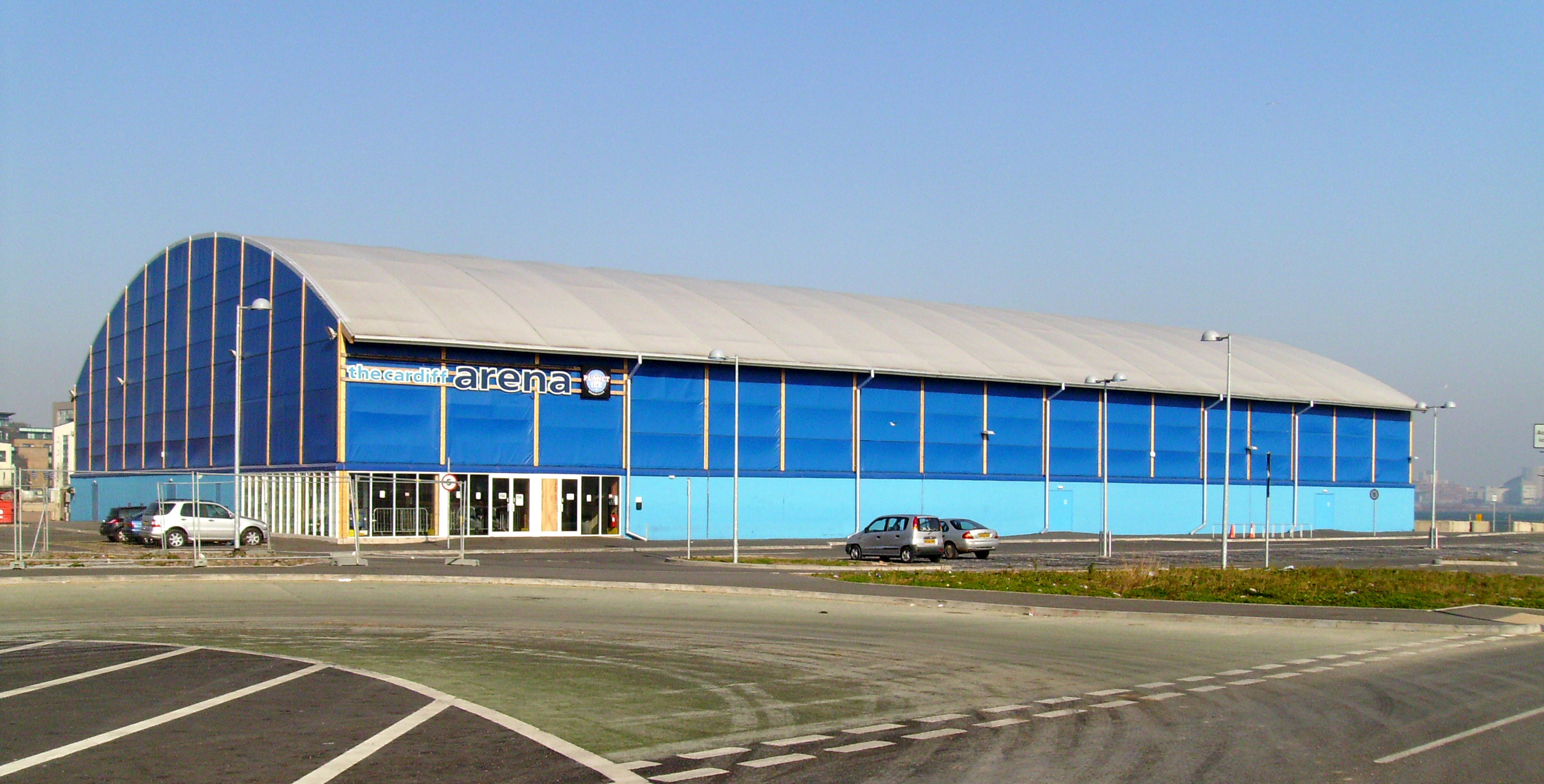
- Interactive map of Cardiff Arena
- Location: Cardiff International Sports Village, Cardiff Bay
- Coordinates: 51.4504°N 3.1794°W
- Capacity: 2,500

Construction
- Opened: 6 December 2006
- Closed: 27 February 2016
- Demolished: 2016

Tenant
- Cardiff Devils

Cardiff Arena, also known as Cardiff Bay Ice Arena and by ice hockey fans as the Big Blue Tent, was a temporary ice rink at Cardiff International Sports Village in Cardiff Bay, Cardiff, Wales. It had a capacity of 2,500 for ice hockey and was home to the Cardiff Devils after leaving the Wales National Ice Rink which was being demolished to make way for a John Lewis department store.

It was also used for figure skating and hosted three competitions (in February 2009, 2011 and 2012). It was replaced as the home of the Cardiff Devils when they moved into the Ice Arena Wales.

== History ==
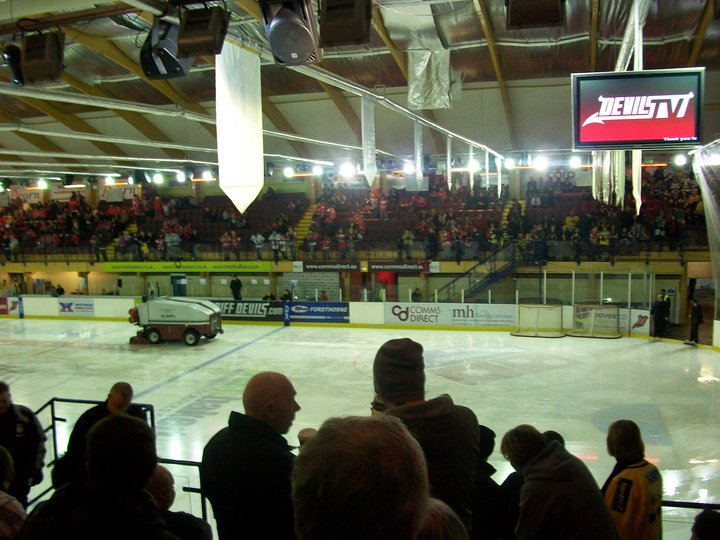
Interior prior to an ice hockey game

=== Construction, opening ===
The ice rink was a prefabricated structure constructed in Finland. Assembly began in 2006 and after a number of delays opened on 6 December 2006 when the Devils hosted the Manchester Phoenix (who, coincidentally, were also waiting for a similar venue to be completed) in an Elite Ice Hockey League fixture. The Devils won the game 7-4 while Manchester's Tony Hand became the first player to score a goal at the rink.

=== Closure ===
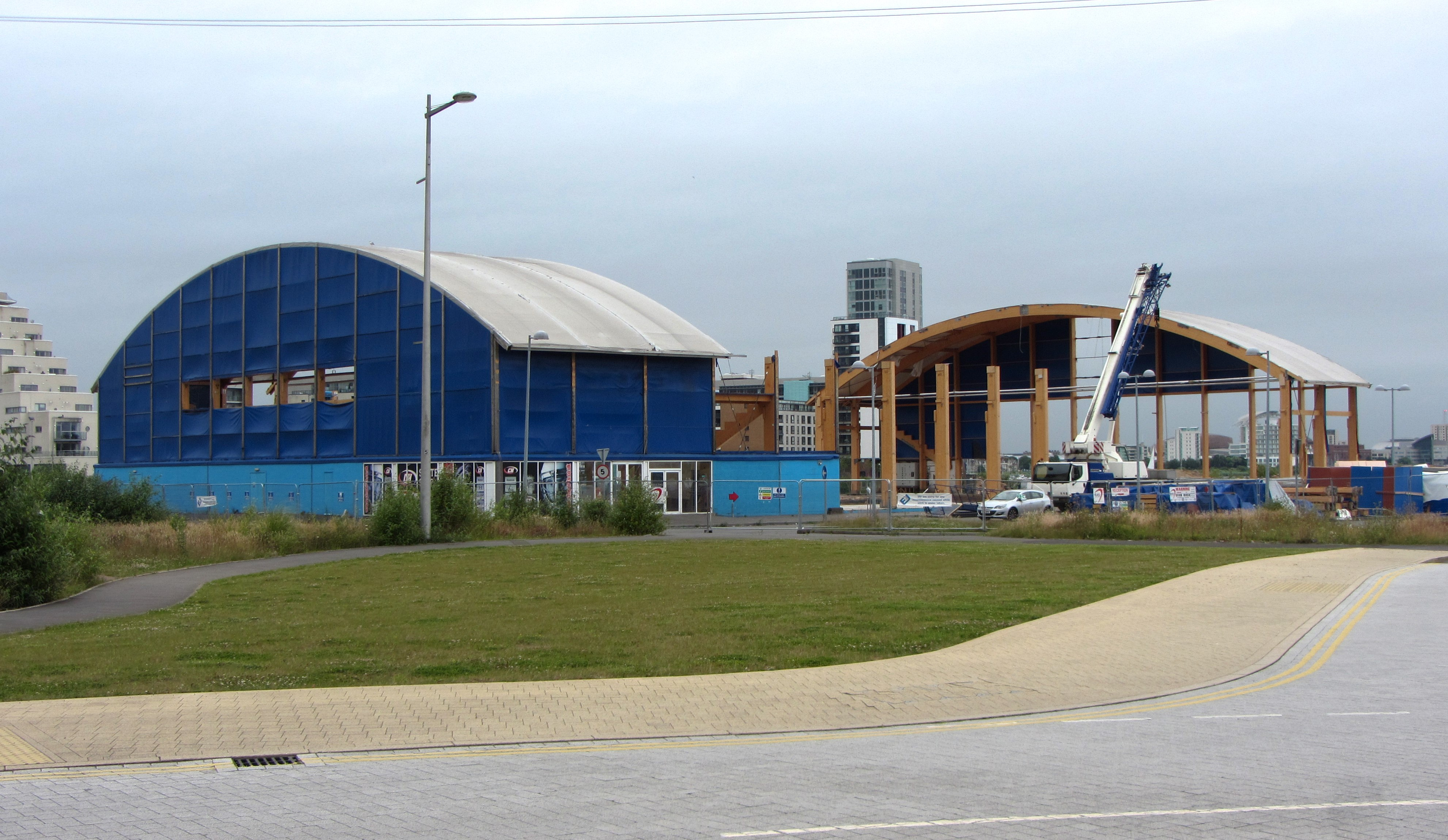
Cardiff Arena being dismantled in July 2016

The last game in the Cardiff Arena was played against Coventry Blaze on 27 February 2016. The first game in Ice Arena Wales was against the Belfast Giants on 12 March 2016.

In Summer 2016, the rink was dismantled. The wooden frame was moved to Leeds where it will be upgraded to form part of the new ice rink located on Elland Road, yards away from Leeds United Football Club. The upgrade will consist of new walls and an extension at the non-seated end of the rink which will include a bar and cafe over two floors. The stairs to the seating area have also been moved to the back in order to improve sightlines.

== See also ==
- Sport in Cardiff
