= Yvonne Arnaud Theatre =

Theatre in Guildford, England

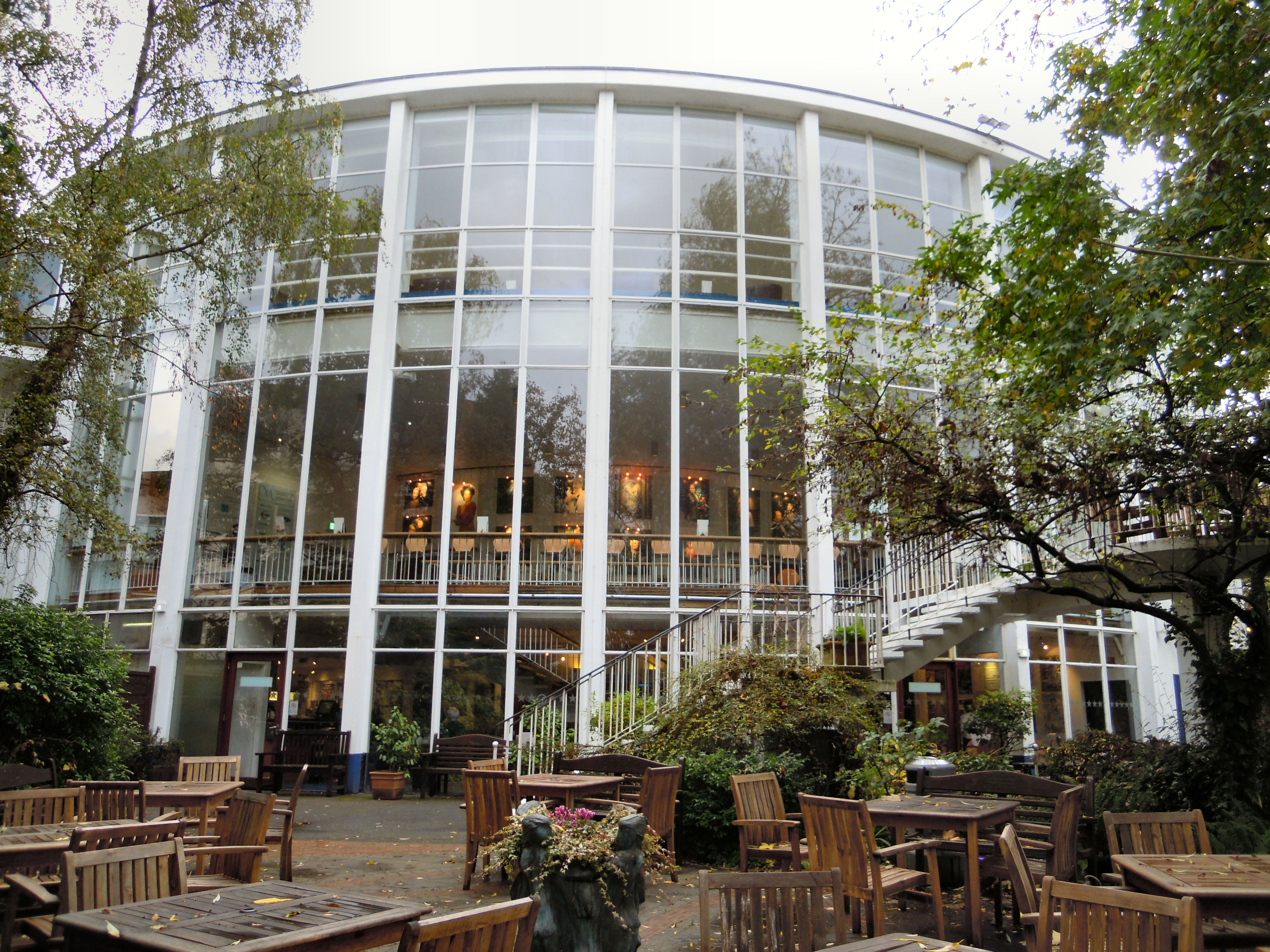
- The theatre from the terrace

- Location within Surrey
- Address: Millmead, Guildford, Surrey
- Coordinates: 51°14′01″N 0°34′30″W
- Capacity: 586
- Type: Theatre

Construction
- Groundbreaking: October 1962
- Built: 11 November 1964
- Opened: 2 June 1965
- Cost: £335,000
- Architect: John Brownrigg
- Main contractors: Marshall-Andrew & Co

Website
- www.yvonne-arnaud.co.uk

Listed Building – Grade II
- Designated: 11 October 2012
- Reference no.: 1407438

The Yvonne Arnaud Theatre is a theatre located in Guildford, Surrey, England. Named after the actress Yvonne Arnaud, it presents a series of locally produced and national touring productions, including opera, ballet and pantomime. The theatre has two performance venues, the main auditorium and the smaller Mill Studio.

== History ==
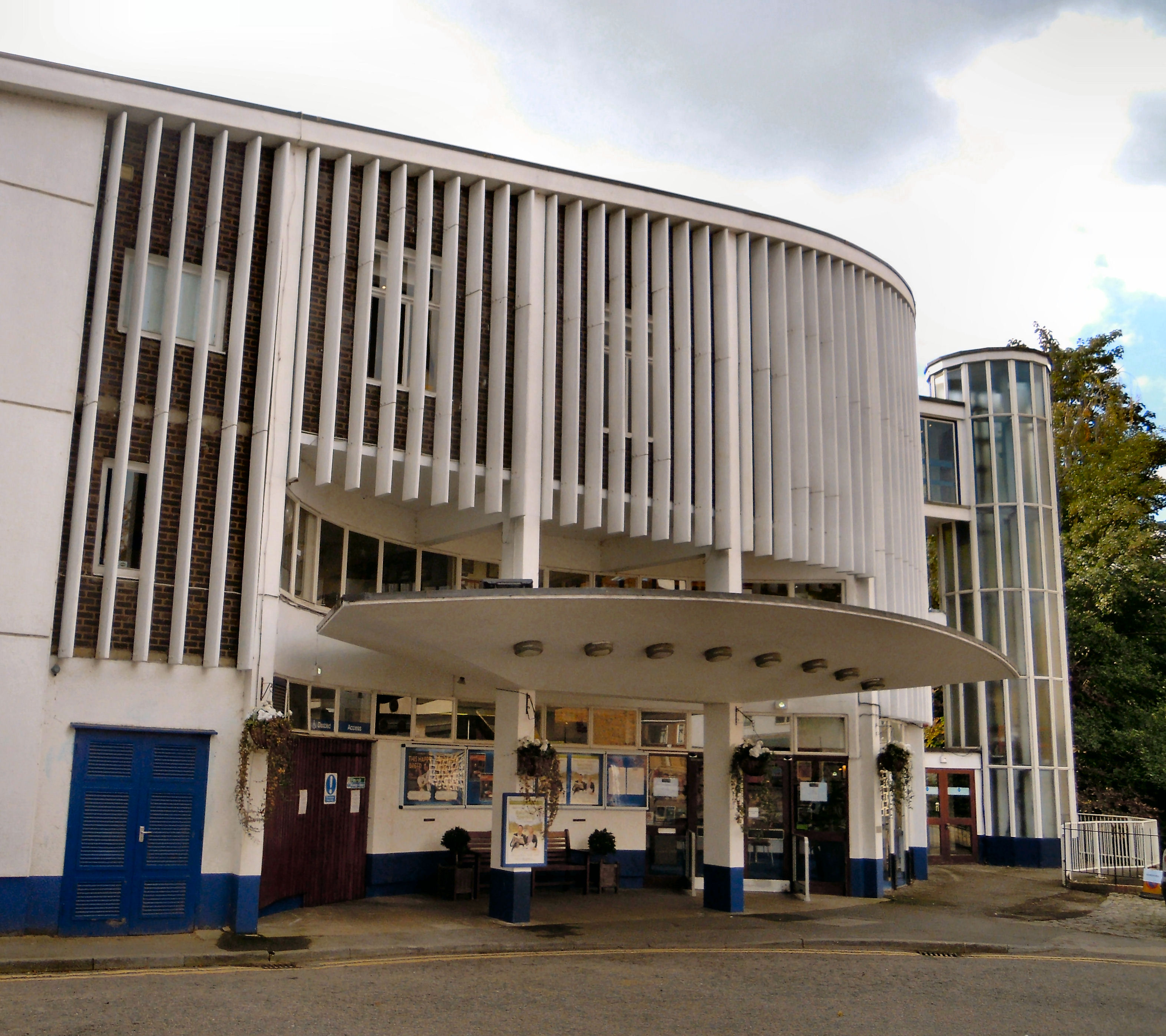
Main entrance

Replacing a former repertory theatre in North Street which had been gutted by a fire in 1963, the present complex was opened in 1965 in a riverside site, incorporating a restaurant and bar available to non-theatregoers. Sir Michael Redgrave had ceremonially driven the first pile in October 1962. The foundation stone was laid by Vanessa Redgrave in September 1963, who commemorated the occasion by casting her foot in concrete. Susan Hampshire "topped out" the roof of the theatre on 11 November 1964.

The company opted to dispense with traditional repertory theatre in favour of a more flexible model in which actors are cast as appropriate to different productions. Many stars have performed at the theatre over the years. Stephen Barry was a young assistant director in the 1960s. The first artistic director, Laurier Lister, was succeeded in 1975 by Val May. The theatre was under the directorship of James Barber from 1992 until his death on 29 December 2017. His successor is Joanna Read, formerly Principal at LAMDA and prior to that Artistic Director of the Salisbury Playhouse.

The founding chairman was one-time Mayor of Guildford Archie Graham-Brown.

It is a Grade II listed building since 2012, and the architect was John Brownrigg of the locally-based firm Scott Brownrigg and Turner.

== The stage ==
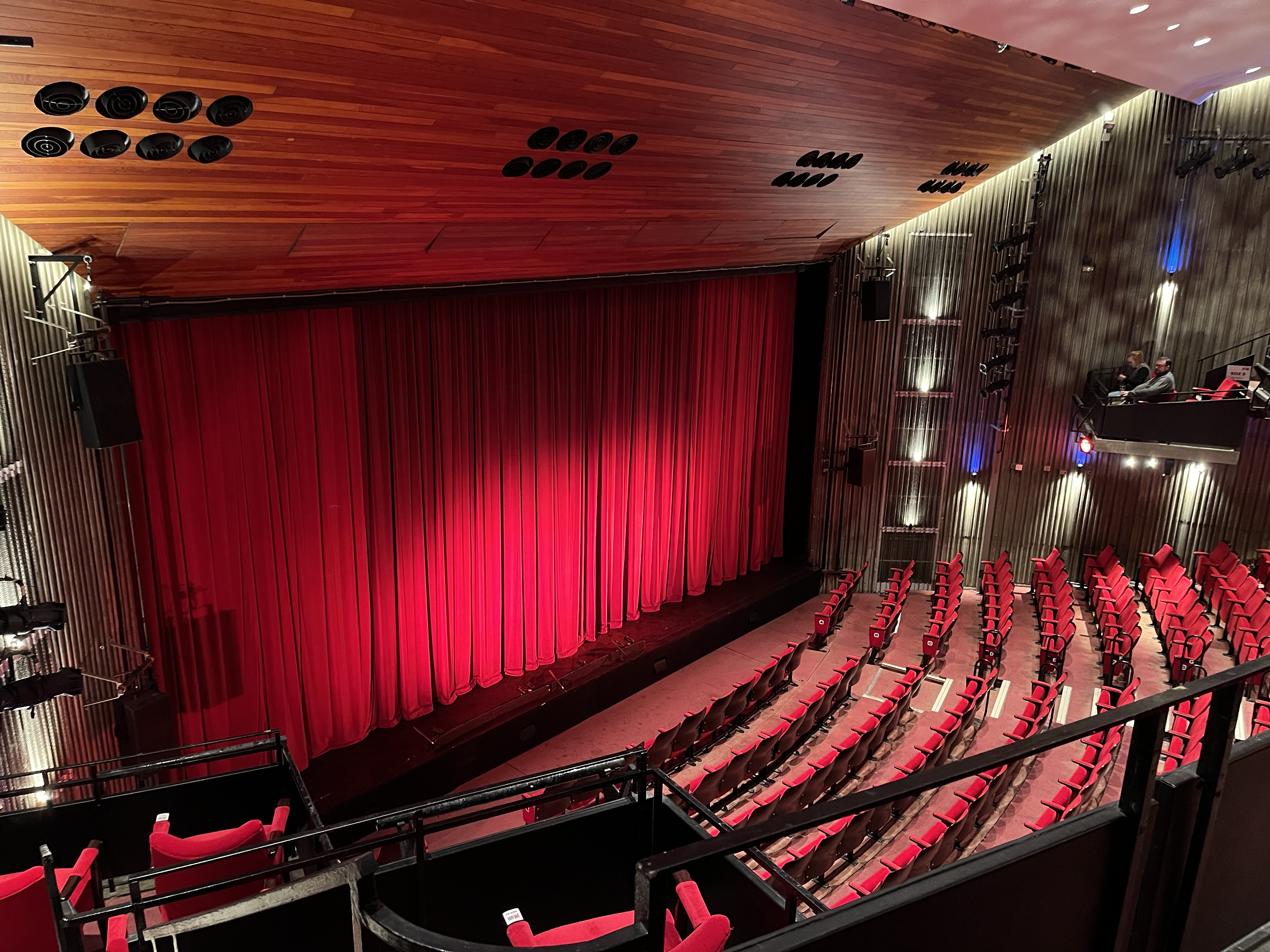
The auditorium in 2026

The theatre was designed to be as adaptable as possible to allow for the staging of every kind of performance. There is no proscenium arch allowing the full width of the stage to be utilised if wanted. The stage itself is 95 ft (29 m) from wing to wing and 33 ft (10 m) deep. it has a fly tower and a permanent curved cyclorama that is 60 ft (18 m) wide. The stage has a 25 ft (7.6 m) diameter revolve. A removable apron stage section allows for an orchestra pit for 22 musicians or an extra two rows of seats as required. When built the maximum seating capacity was 574. Since then it has been increased to 586.

== Opening festival ==
The theatre was opened on 2 June 1965 with Dirk Bogarde speaking a prologue written for the occasion. The first play was A Month in the Country by Ivan Turgenev with Ingrid Bergman in the leading role. It was followed by Milton's Samson Agonistes and Dibdin's Lionel and Clarissa. The festival programme was devised by Michael Redgrave.

== Present ==
The theatre presents a mixed year-round production schedule that includes an annual pantomime. Its scenery workshop builds for Glyndebourne, the Royal Shakespeare Company and Chichester Festival Theatre. A youth department offers regular productions in the Mill Studio and an annual summer musical on the main stage. The wider theatre space is used for arts and functional purposes including art exhibitions and the annual film season feature, and includes a cafe, restaurant and bar.

=== The Mill Studio ===
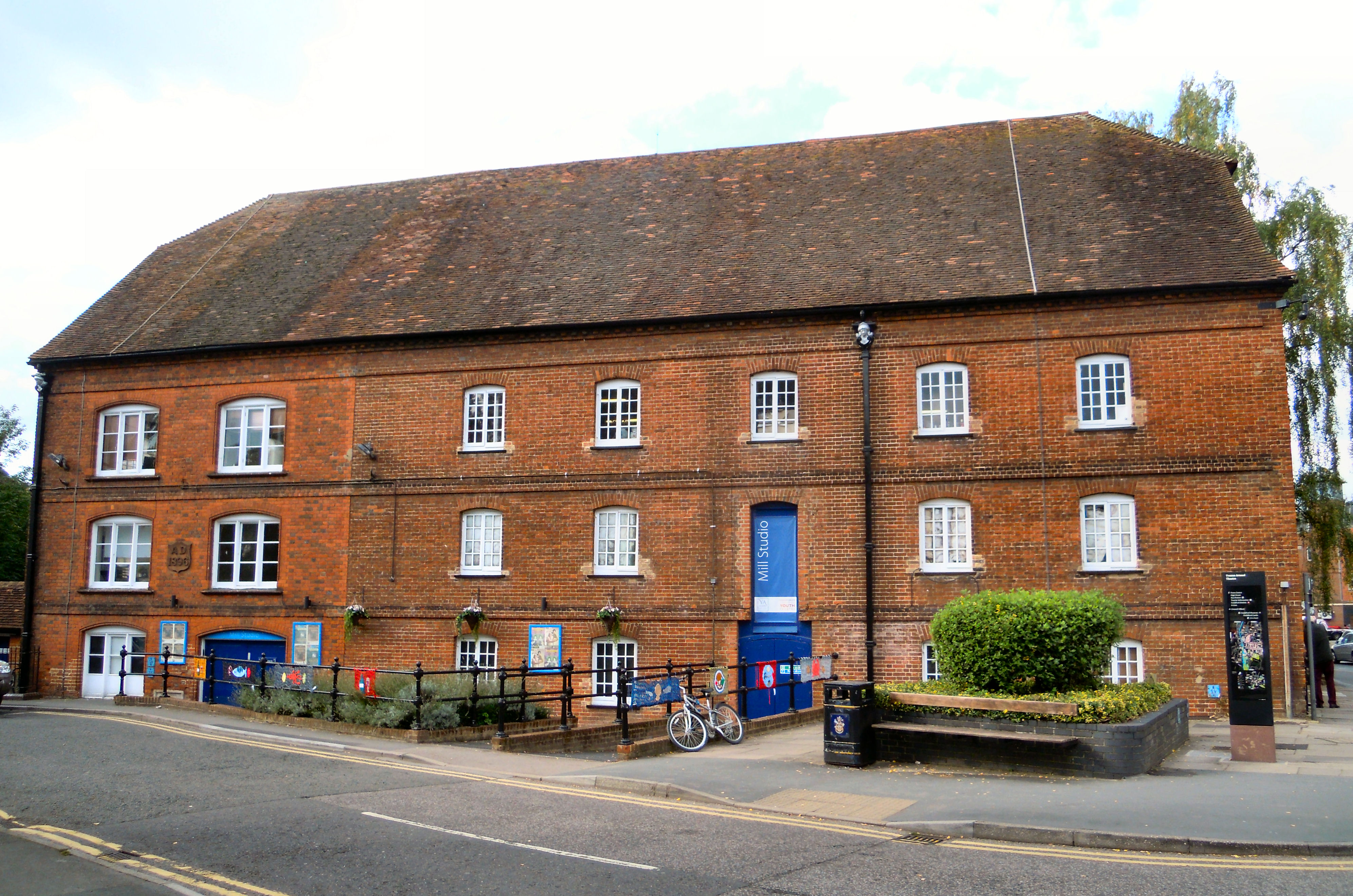
The Mill Studio

Initially, the eighteenth-century Town Mill building housed the theatre's workshops. The studio opened in 1993 as a base for the Youth Theatre's activities. In 1997, a National Lottery grant was used to upgrade the facilities, enabling expansion in audience capacity and the range of productions presented.
