= Cardiff Celts Volleyball Club =

Volleyball club in Cardiff, Wales

Cardiff Celts VC
- Full name: Cardiff Celts Volleyball Club
- Short name: Celts
- Founded: 2009 (merger of Bridgend and Cardiff Tigers)
- Ground: USW FitZone (Capacity: 100)
- Chairman: Dawn Webb
- Manager: Kate Falkner
- League: Volleyball England National Junior Grand Prix
- Website: Club home page

Cardiff Celts Volleyball Club is a volleyball club based in Pontypridd, South Wales. The club has lots of mini junior boys and girls teams and one women's teams playing in the Bristol and District volleyball League, as well as junior teams competing locally in the National Junior Volleyball England Gran Prix. The club was formed as the result of the merger between Cardiff Tigers volleyball club and Bridgend volleyball club.
