= Randy Brownrigg =

American politician

Member of New Hampshire House of Representatives for Hillsborough 27
- In office 2010–2012

Personal details
- Party: Republican

Randall "Randy" Brownrigg is an American politician. He was a member of the New Hampshire House of Representatives from 2010 to 2012.

Brownrigg was part of the Donald Trump 2024 presidential campaign in New Hampshire.
