= John Brownrigg (architect) =

English architect

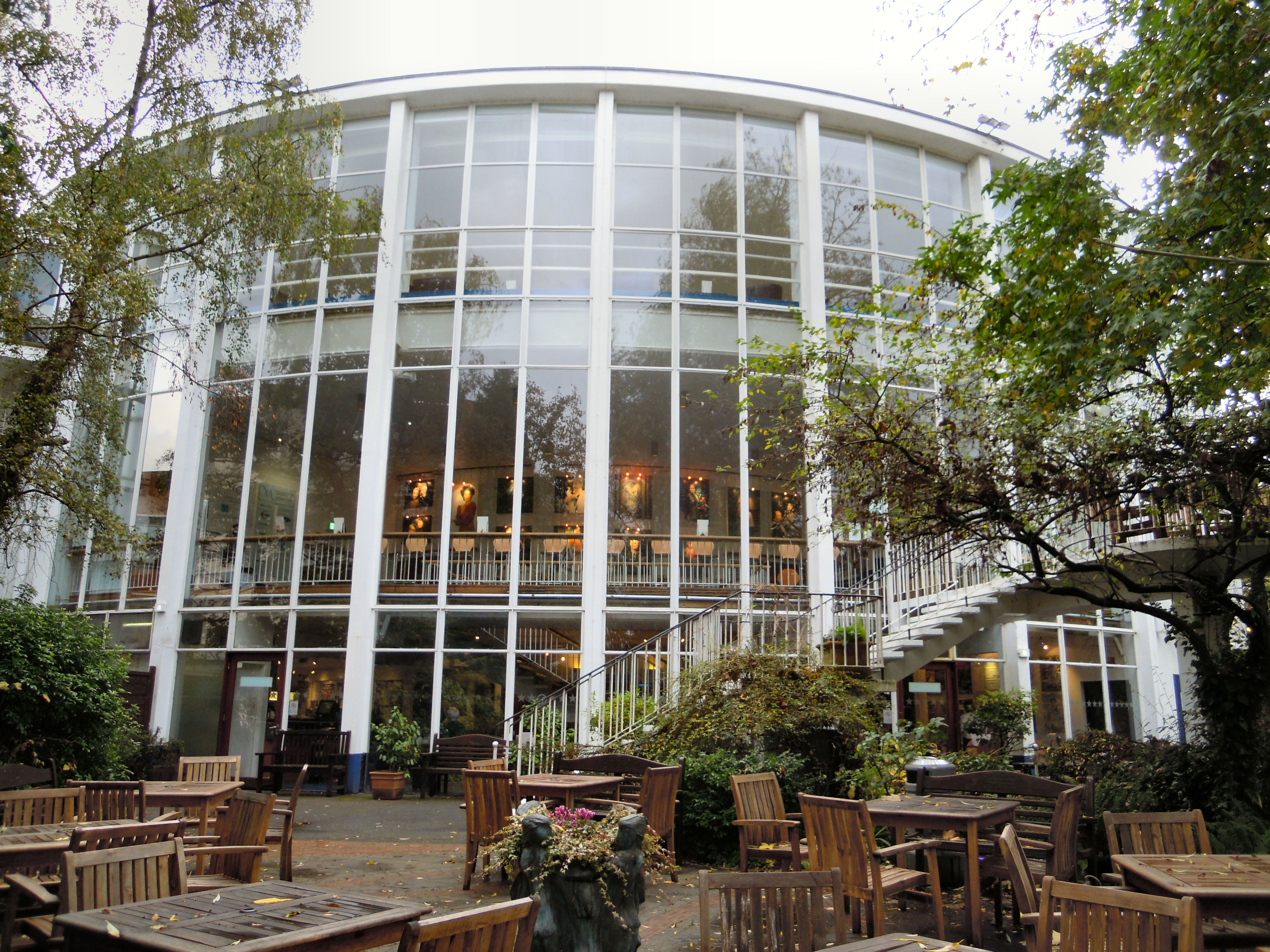
The Yvonne Arnaud Theatre from the terrace

John Edward Annesley Brownrigg (5 May 1911, Hambledon, Surrey – 2002, Guildford, Surrey) was an English architect.

Brownrigg was born on 5 May 1911, the son of a fellow architect, Annesley Harold Brownrigg FRIBA of Annesley Brownrigg and Hiscock. He was educated at Fernden School, Haslemere, and Charterhouse.

He was based in Guildford where he designed many projects for the locally based firm Scott Brownrigg & Turner, that he co-founded. His best known work is the Yvonne Arnaud Theatre, which has been Grade II listed since 2012.
