= Henry Brownrigg =

Henry Brownrigg may refer to:

- Sir Henry John Studholme Brownrigg (1882–1943), British Royal Navy officer and Commander-in-Chief of The Nore
- Henry J. Brownrigg (1874–1945), Newfoundland merchant and politician
