= History of lidos in the United Kingdom =

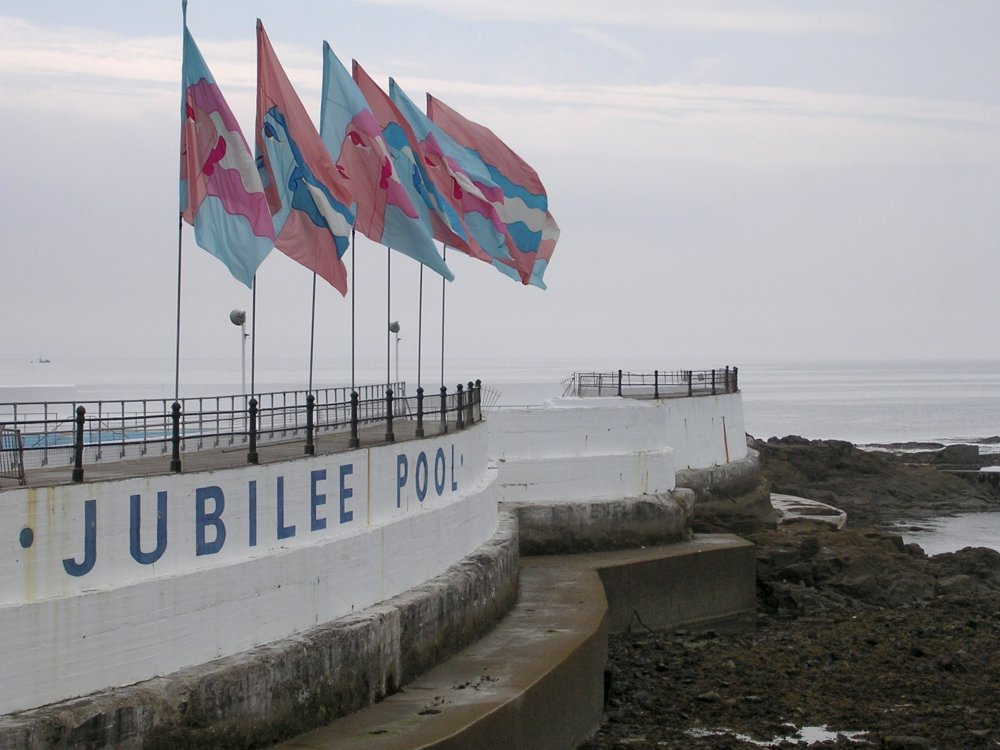
Jubilee Pool, Penzance—a saltwater lido

The golden age of lidos in the United Kingdom was in the 1930s, when outdoor swimming became popular, and 169 were built across the UK as recreational facilities by local councils. Many lidos closed when foreign holidays became less expensive, but those that remain have a dedicated following. The name Lido originated from the Lido di Venezia.

== 1930s ==
The first open air swimming pool that was officially called a lido was "The Edmonton Lido" in Houndsfield Road, Edmonton following reopening after refurbishment on 27 July 1935. The newly built "Tottenham Lido", opened on 5 June 1937, and the "West Ham Municipal Lido", opened on 30 August 1937 also in London, were officially called lidos from the outset. Elsewhere, the Woodford Times reported on 13 May 1932 on the new "Lido" being constructed at Whipps Cross. The Kentish Times on 9 June 1933 similarly carried the headline: "Lagoon 'Lido' Opened on Bank Holiday". Neither of these two pools was officially called a "lido" at that time, however. The term "lido" was also applied to several private sector swimming facilities, including Ruislip Lido (part of a reservoir) opened in May 1936 and Rush Green Lido in old gravel pits in Romford, Essex, in September 1935.

== Closures, rescues and new creations ==
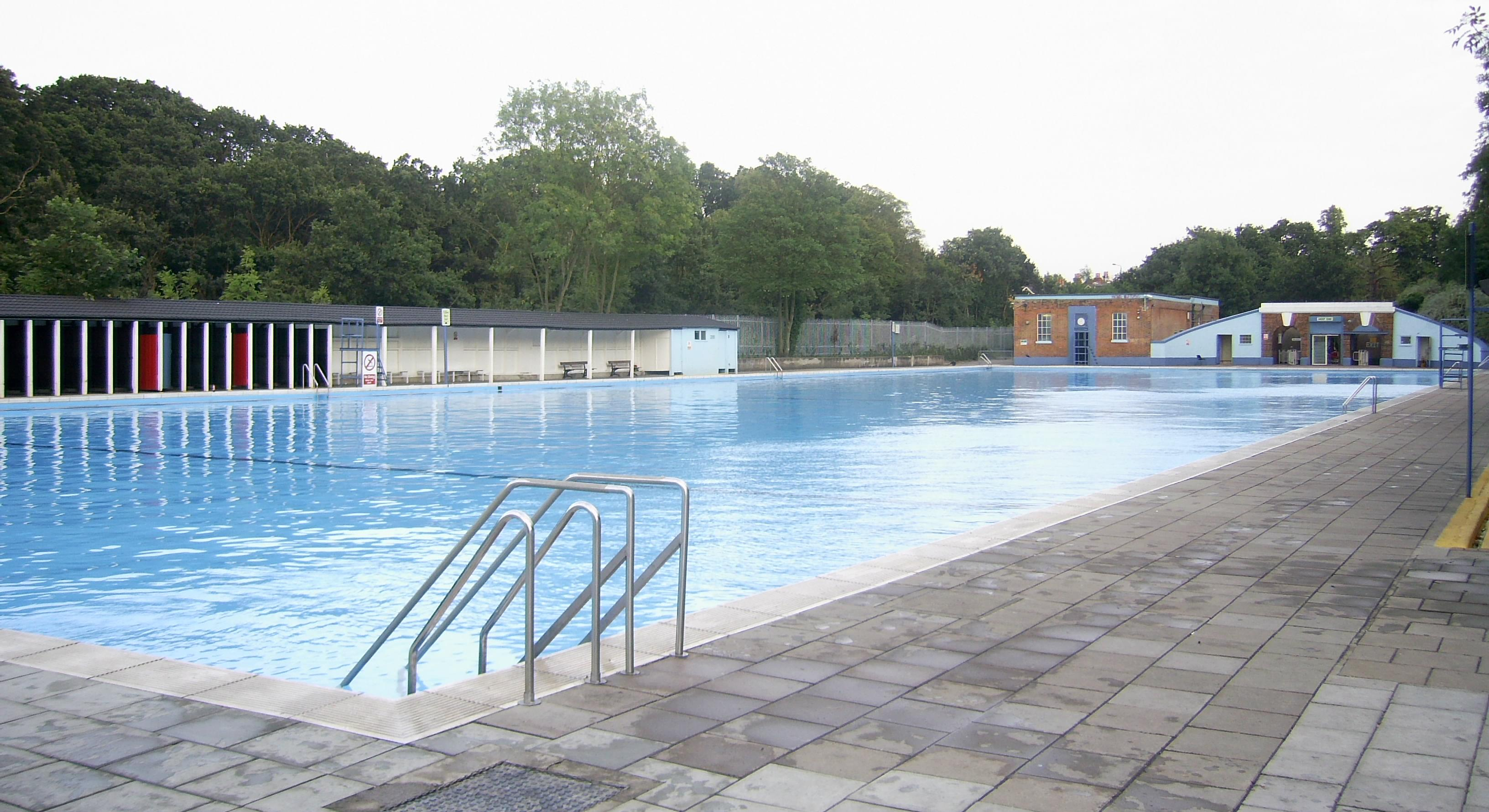
Tooting Bec Lido, the largest swimming pool in England, is 100 yards long and 33 yards wide; it was rescued from closure in the 1990s.

There were numerous lidos (particularly in London and the south-west); however, since the 1930s (and especially since the 1980s and 1990s), hundreds have closed. Today, there are 127 lidos remaining open in England. Notable examples in London are Brockwell Lido in Herne Hill, Parliament Hill Lido at Gospel Oak in Hampstead Heath and Tooting Bec Lido in South London. Examples beyond London include Jesus Green Swimming Pool in Cambridge, Sandford Parks Lido in Cheltenham, Ilkley Lido and Ingleton Lido further north in Yorkshire.

In 2005, English Heritage published Liquid Assets - the lidos and open air pools of Britain, by Janet Smith, produced as part of the Played in Britain series. The author had spent years researching (and swimming in) lidos around the country and her book explores the past, present and future of open air pools. It led to two major conferences in 2006: "Reviving Lidos" and "Making a Splash".

Although there have been many setbacks, long-running campaigns have resulted in some important successes. In October 2006 the London Fields Lido re-opened in Hackney after a campaign lasting nearly 20 years; Droitwich Spa Lido also reopened after a six-year battle by the group SALT (Save a Lido Today); Brockwell Lido celebrated its 70th birthday on 10 July 2007; Clifton Lido reopened in 2008; Wood Green Pool in Banbury reopened in 2009; and Charlton Lido reopened in 2012.

The campaign to save the Grade II* listed Saltdean Lido in East Sussex which closed in 2010 won significant funding, including over £2m from the Coastal Communities Fund, and a new community interest company started work on the pool in 2015, which reopened in 2017. The Edwardian King's Meadow swimming pool in Reading is being restored by the same group which rescued and re-opened the Clifton Lido in Bristol. The derelict Ynysangharad Lido in Pontypridd is also being restored as part of the local council's redevelopment plans. Woburn Lido in Bedfordshire which opened in 1911 faced closure in 2013, but was saved from closure through the work of local residents.

Other ongoing campaigns include reopening Broomhill Pool in Ipswich, Peckham Rye Lido in South East London, the Cleveland Pools at Hampton Row in Bath (where the historic Grade II* listed baths, which date back to 1815, are believed to be the oldest surviving public outdoor swimming pools in the country) and Grange Lido (another Grade II listed baths and the only Art Deco lido in the north of England).

Arundel Lido is situated in the town of Arundel within the South Downs National Park. It has heated pools, and grass areas surrounding the pools suitable for sunbathing and picnics. Planning permission was granted in 2018 for the Lido Extended Activities Plan - Project LEAP to develop an all-year-round facility with heated changing facilities, a Gym, Community Hall and Cafe.

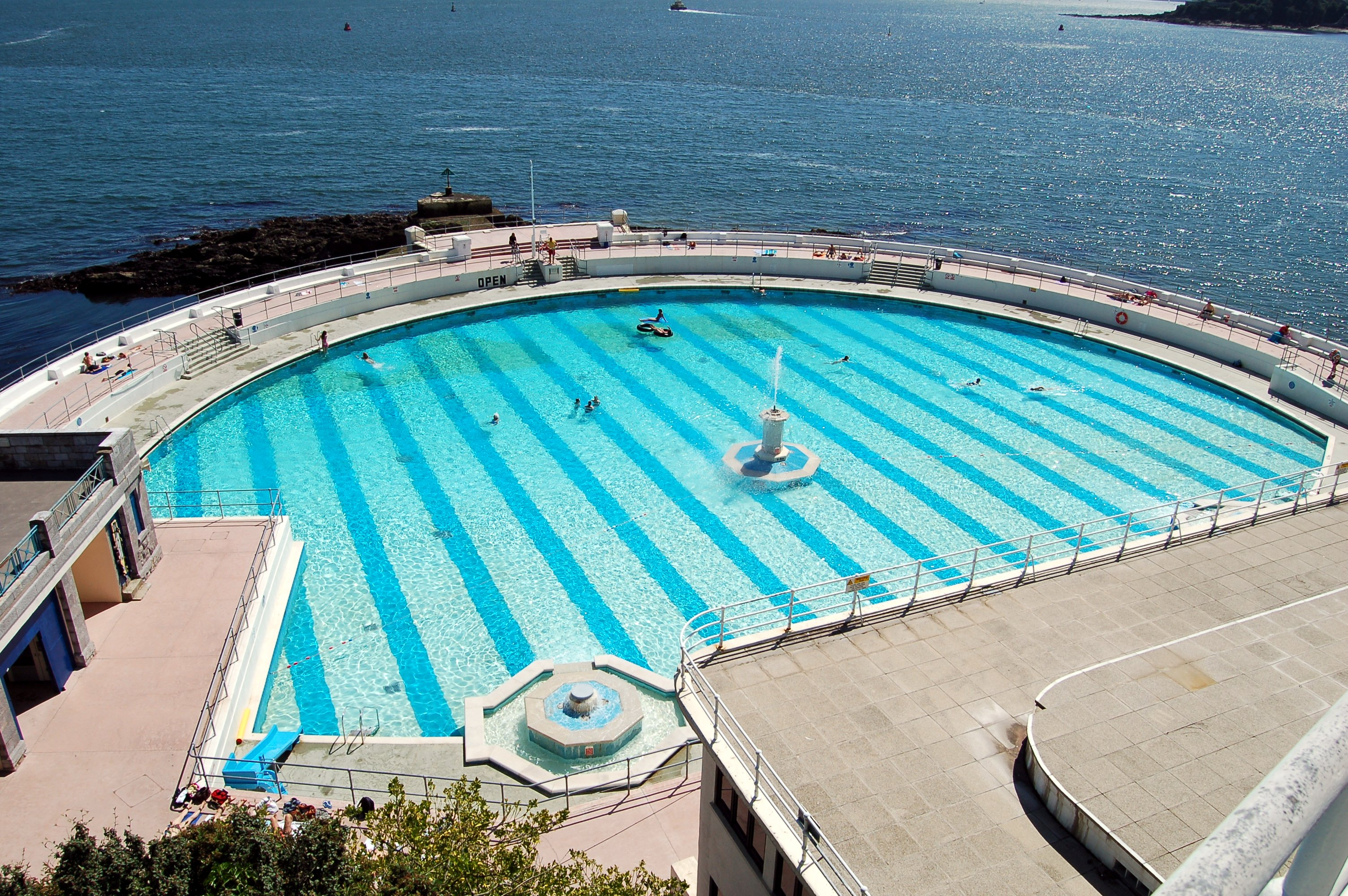
Tinside Lido has repeatedly featured in the top 10 best outdoor pools in Europe since it reopened in 2005.

Plymouth is home to the Tinside Lido, a 1935 Art Deco seawater pool built on the limestone shoreline at the base of Plymouth Hoe. The semi-circular lido also has three fountains and disabled access, and is open from May to September.

A London-based organisation Thames Baths was created to develop plans for a new floating lido on the Thames at Embankment, seeking to crowd-fund the £10m cost of construction. Thames Baths' design company Studio Octopi has also won a design competition for plans for the creation of a new lido at Peckham Rye, where one closed in 1987 and was demolished. A new 40m bathing pond has already been created as part of King's Cross developments in North London.

Clevedon's Marine Lake underwent an £850,000 renovation project that included de-silting the tidally topped up pool (about 16,000 tonnes of silt was removed), increasing access to the lake. The project was funded by Clevedon Town Council, Marlens (Marine Lake Enthusiasts), and North Somerset Council. Also in North Somerset, the Portishead Open Air Pool, built in 1962, later than the 1930s boom, was threatened with closure in 2008 due to falling visitor numbers. A Save the Open Air Pool campaign facilitated a takeover by a newly formed community trust. The facility gained national attention in 2009 when it was refurbished as part of the television series Ty Pennington's Great British Adventure, which aided its reopening in 2010. In 2024, the trust secured £1.33 million from the UK government's Community Ownership Fund to modernise the facilities and improve energy efficiency.

In 2026, the Department for Digital, Culture, Media and Sport stated it would create a national fund to support UK lidos.

== See also ==
- Open water swimming
- Swimming hole

== Sources ==
- Smith, Janet (2006). Liquid assets: the lidos and open air swimming pools of Britain. English Heritage. ISBN 0-9547445-0-0.
