= Jubilee Pool =

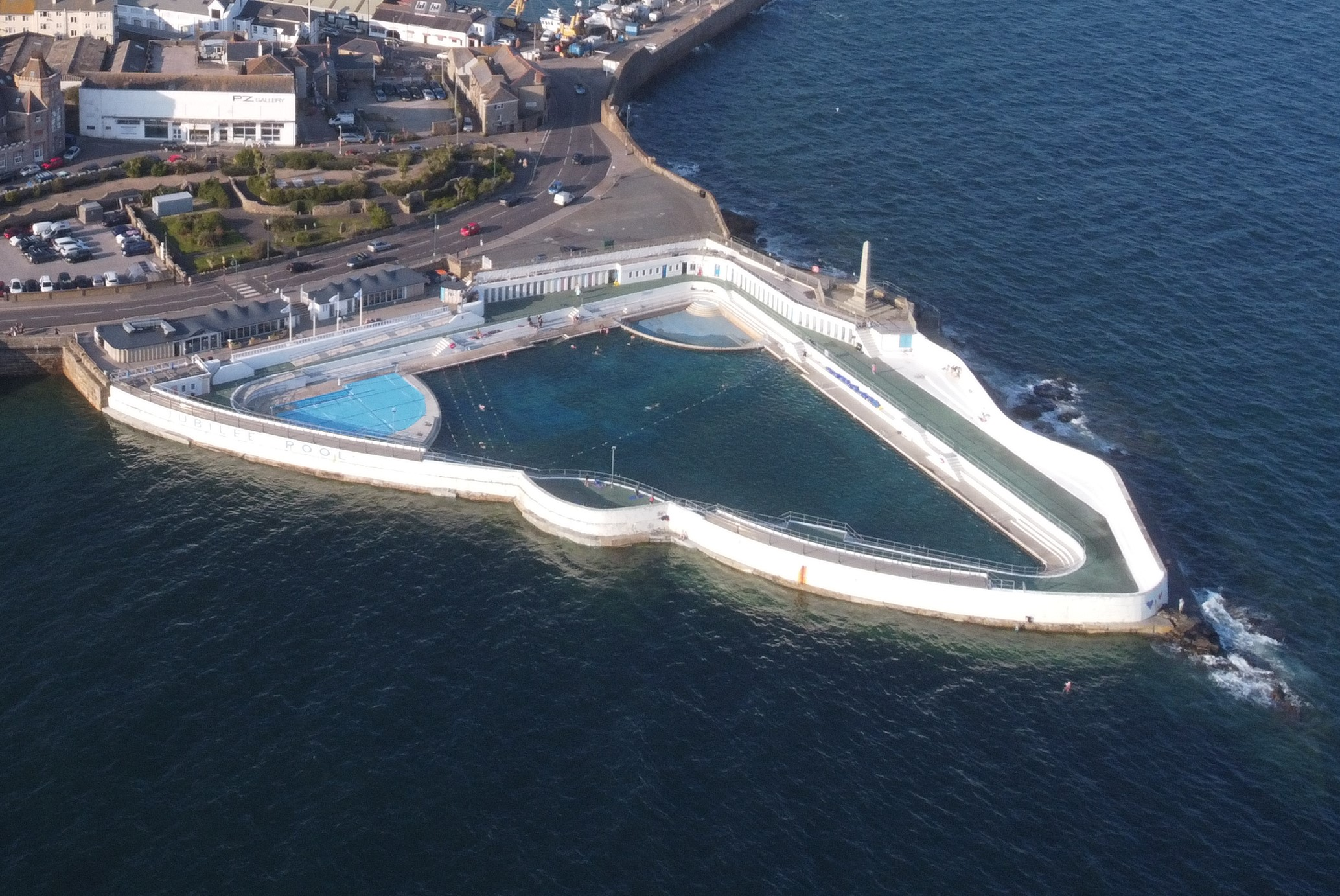
- The pool from the air in 2021

- Location of Jubilee Pool within Cornwall
- 50.114784°N 5.531454°W
- Location: Battery Road, Penzance, Cornwall, England

History
- Built: 1935

Site notes
- Architect: Frank Latham

Listed Building – Grade II
- Official name: Jubilee Pool
- Designated: 4 March 1993
- Reference no.: 1221190

Jubilee Pool (Cornish: Poll Jubile) is an Art Deco lido in Penzance, Cornwall. It is Grade II listed, being recognised as the finest surviving example of its type with the exception of Saltdean Lido. With a capacity of 5 million litres and 600 swimmers and measuring 300 feet long and 160 feet wide, it is the UK's largest seawater pool.

== History ==
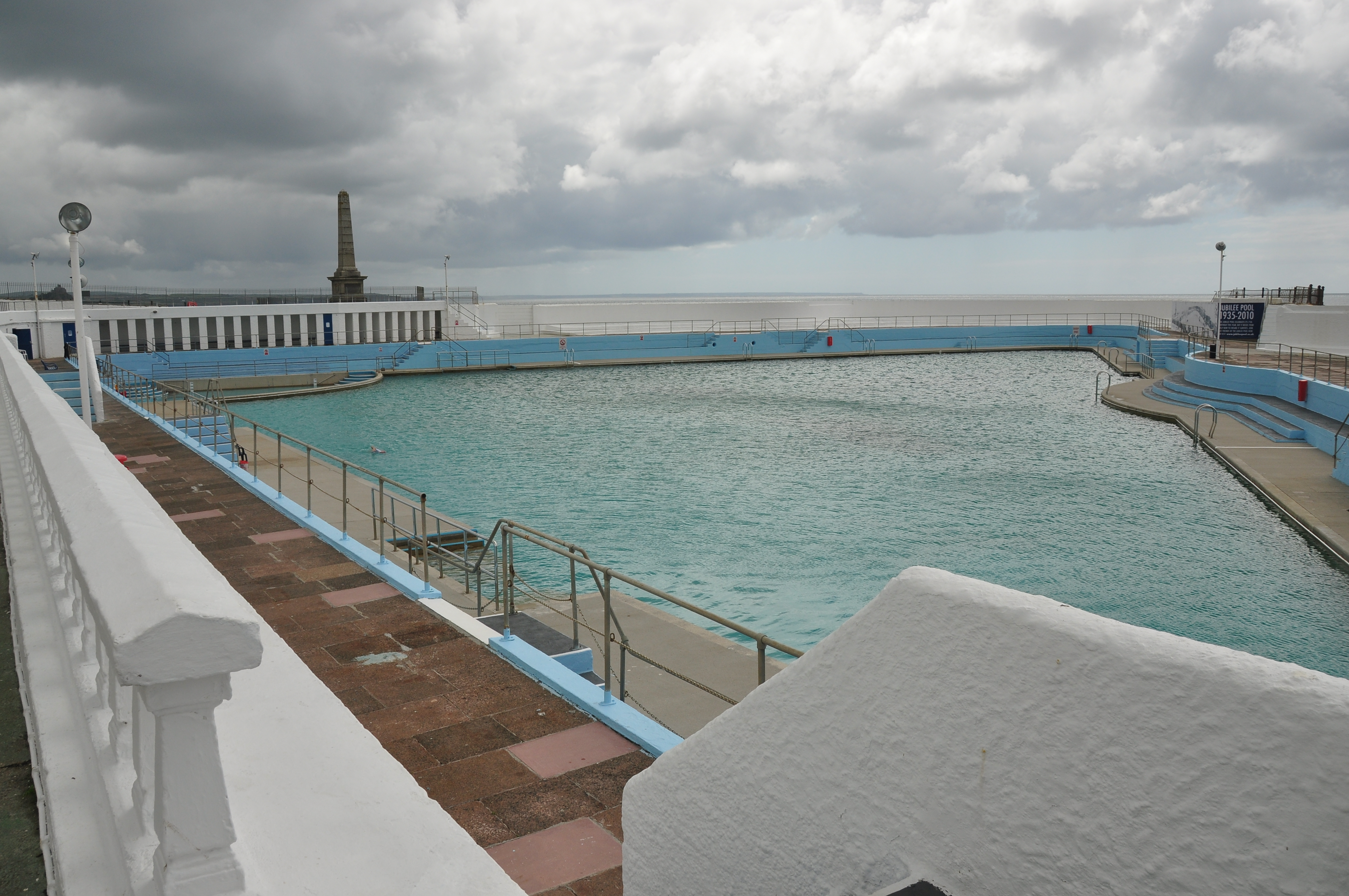
The pool from its west end in 2011

=== Construction and opening ===
The plan to build a pool in Penzance became something of a political issue, with local councillors seeing it as a choice between the pool or improving the town's water supply. One town councillor predicted the project would be "the biggest white elephant Penzance has ever had".

The lido was designed between 1931 and 1934 to be built on Battery Rocks, which was already a popular bathing spot, to designs by Captain Frank Latham, the Borough Engineer of Penzance. Its design has been described as "Art Deco", "Art Nouveau-styled" and "cubist-inspired", and is reportedly influenced by the shape of a seagull in flight.

It was opened on the 31 May 1935, as part of the Silver Jubilee celebrations for King George V. By August 1935, almost 60,000 people had visited the pool resulting in takings of nearly £700.

=== Use and decline ===
The pool was damaged by the Ash Wednesday Storm of 1962 which hit the UK on 13 March 1962, with the lido's far wall being breached.

Visitor numbers declined after the 1970s, when the popularity of lidos waned, and the pool fell into disrepair. Plans to turn the site into a leisure centre were proposed, The pool was closed in 1992, but was restored and made a listed building after the formation of the Jubilee Pool Association (later called the Friends of Jubilee Pool). The campaign gained support in Penzance, but the costs of maintenance and restoration were opposed by some local councillors from St Ives and Hayle who felt that ratepayers in their towns were being forced to pay for something that they did not use.

New sea defences and a reinforced concrete lining were built in 1993 at a cost of £260,000. The funding for renovation was sourced from the local authority Penwith District Council, the UK government, and the European Union.

=== Revival ===
The pool had a revival in 1994 with a 'Grand Re-opening' and Penzance-born actress Jan Harvey launching the lido's new season. The successful reopening led to calls for Tinside Lido in Plymouth to also be refurbished and reopened.

The lido suffered "serious structural damage" during the winter storms in February 2014, with changing rooms and terraces being demolished and the floor of the pool being destroyed. It was repaired at a cost of £2.94m which was raised by the local community as well as with grants from the Power to Change Trust and the Coastal Communities Fund. Jubilee Pool re-opened in May 2016. In both 2016 and 2017, the lido had around 40,000 visitors.

Following a £1.4m European Regional Development Fund grant, Jubilee Pool became the UK's only lido heated with geothermal energy in 2019 after a 410m deep geothermal well was drilled into the rock below the pool. In 2020, Parkdean Resorts named Jubilee Pool the UK's best lido.

As of 2021, Jubilee Pool is owned by 1,400 local shareholders and is run as a social enterprise. Design writer Dominic Lutyens included Jubilee Pool in his collection of the best public swimming pools in the world in August 2022.

== See also ==
- History of lidos in the United Kingdom
- Media related to Jubilee Pool at Wikimedia Commons
