= Charlton Lido =

Swimming pool in southeast London, England

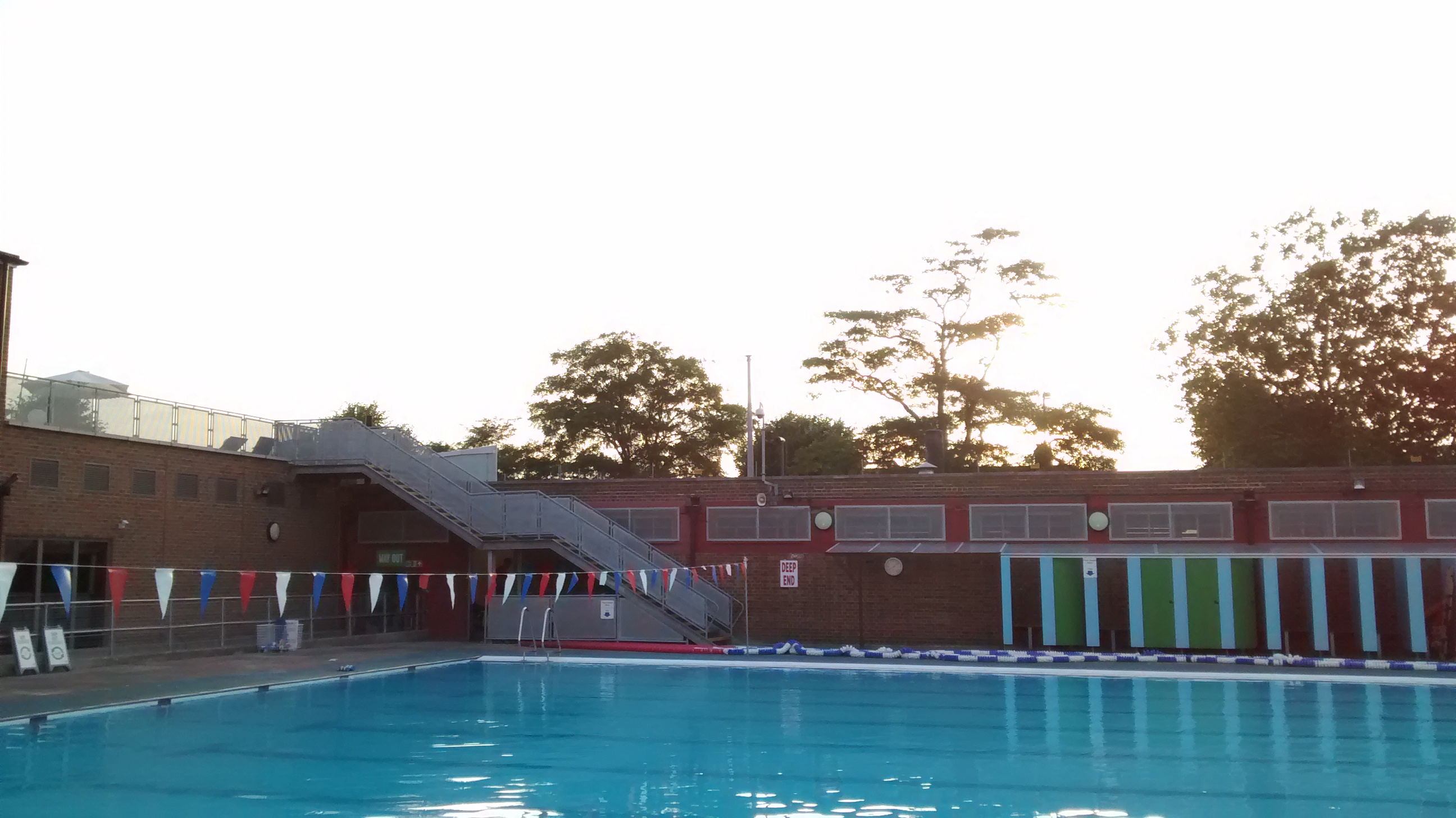
- The deep end of Charlton Lido
- Interactive map of Charlton Lido
- Location: Hornfair Park, Shooters Hill Rd, London, SE18 4LX
- Coordinates: 51°28′33″N 0°02′20″E
- Owner: Greenwich London Borough Council
- Operator: Greenwich Leisure Limited
- Type: open air
- Facilities: gym, spin studio, cafe
- Dimensions: Length: 50 metres (160 ft); Width: 20 metres (66 ft)

Construction
- Opened: 1939
- Architect: Harry Rowbotham and T. L. Smithson

Website
- Charlton Lido website

Charlton Lido (branded as Charlton Lido and Lifestyle Club) is a swimming pool and leisure centre in Hornfair Park, Charlton, southeast London.

== Facilities ==
As well as the outdoor Olympic-size swimming pool heated to 25C all year, the centre has a children's pool, outdoor sunbathing space, a gym, spin studio, and a cafe and rooftop terrace, plus tennis courts nearby. It is managed by Greenwich Leisure Limited (GLL, trading as 'Better') on behalf of Greenwich London Borough Council.

== History ==
The last municipal lido to be built in London, Charlton Lido first opened in May 1939. Similar to other London County Council lidos designed by Harry Rowbotham and T. L. Smithson in the Moderne style, it has a 165-foot main pool, a smaller children's pool, cascaded aerator fountains and Moderne-style shelters and changing blocks. It closed four months after opening due to the outbreak of World War II, eventually reopening in 1946.

Declining revenue and increasing costs meant the lido closed to the public in 1989, though it continued to be used sporadically by local clubs. It became derelict in the 2000s, but was refurbished ahead of the 2012 London Olympics, with the first phase completed in July 2012, attracting 5,000 visitors in its first month of operation. At the time of the £5m refurbishment, a GLL proposal to rename it "Royal Greenwich Lido" was rejected. The refurbishment was completed in 2013, creating what was described by The Guardian as "London’s newest (refurbished) lido, a sparkling facility in an otherwise unremarkable part of London".

In 2019, an event was held to mark the 80th anniversary of the lido's opening, attended by Olympic gold medallist swimmer Duncan Goodhew and Channel swimmer Tom Gregory. Forced to close during the first lockdown of the COVID-19 pandemic in the United Kingdom, Charlton Lido was the first lido to reopen, on 11 July 2020, when restrictions were relaxed. Lamenting the COVID-19 lockdown closure of swimming pools, the London Evening Standard's Vicky Frost earlier described it as:

"... defiantly not built for Instagram. It has neither the cool of Brockwell or London Fields, nor, thankfully, the freezing waters of Tooting or Parliament Hill lidos. ... Instead its 50m lengths are the perfect temperature, and its chilly terraces the perfect space for a post-swim cup of tea."
