= Grand Ocean, Saltdean =

Hotel in Brighton and Hove, England

Grand Ocean
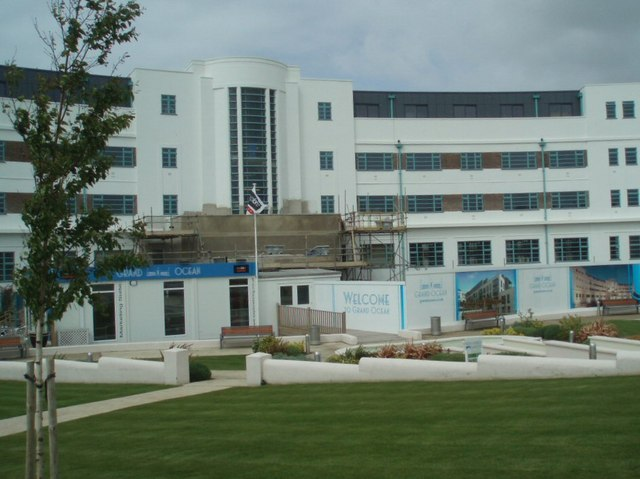
- Interactive map of the Grand Ocean area

General information
- Location: Saltdean, United Kingdom
- Coordinates: 50.802266°N 0.035769°W
- Opening: 1938

Grand Ocean is a restored 1938 hotel building in Saltdean, Brighton, on the south coast of England.

== History ==
Grand Ocean was designed by architect RWH Jones with the classic moderne styling of the age, it opened as a luxury hotel in 1938.

During the Second World War the building was taken over by the fire service and used as a fire service college. It was then bought by Billy Butlin in 1953 and became a Butlin's Holiday camp. In 2005 a theatrical production, Dirty Wonderland, was staged in the former hotel.

Shortly thereafter the main hotel building was redeveloped into luxury apartments.

== Architecture ==
Notable features include the internal staircase and foyer. It is included as the starting point of a local tour of Brighton architecture. along with Brighton Pavilion, Brighton Pier and the Regency Brunswick Town.
