= Portishead Open Air Pool =

Lido in Somerset, England

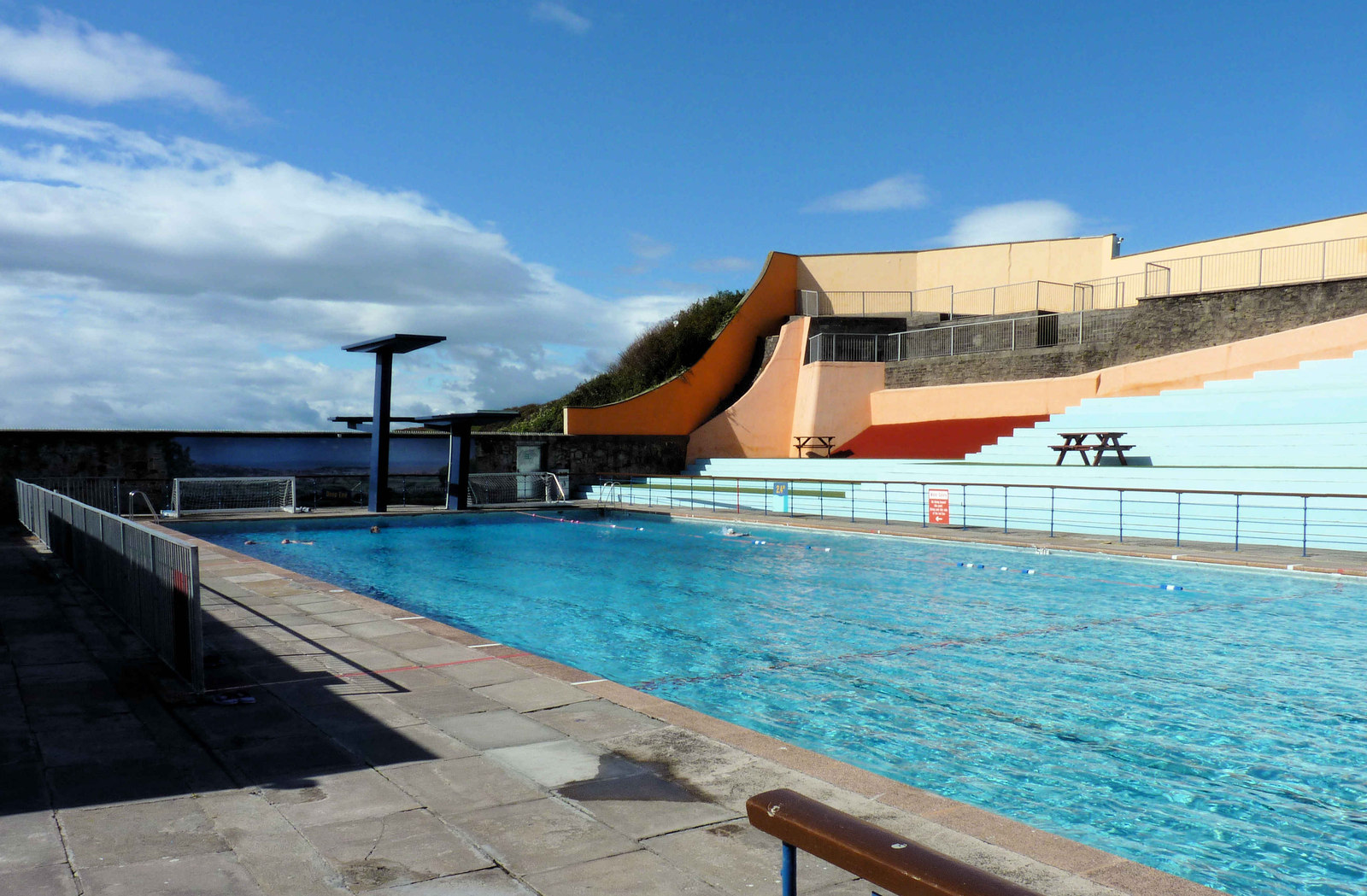
- Interactive map of Portishead Open Air Pool
- Location: Esplanade Road, Portishead, England
- Coordinates: 51.4940°N 2.7716°W
- Owner: North Somerset Council
- Operator: Portishead Pool Community Trust
- Type: Lido
- Dimensions: Length: 33 metres (108 ft)

Construction
- Opened: 1962
- Cost: £60,000

Website
- www.portisheadopenairpool.org.uk

The Portishead Open Air Pool is a community-managed lido overlooking the Severn Estuary and Bristol Channel on Battery Point in Portishead, England. Opened in 1962 as a heated seawater facility serving the rapidly growing town, it is today operated by the charitable Portishead Pool Community Trust, who leases the site from North Somerset Council and runs it on a not-for-profit basis, with reliance on seasonal staff and volunteers. The pool currently attracts between 40,000 and 50,000 visits in a typical season and is recognised by the local planning authority as a non-designated heritage asset because of its social and historical significance.

== History ==
=== Construction and early operation (1962–2007) ===
The pool opened in April 1962 at a cost of £60,000, one of several coastal lidos built in Southwest England during the post-war boom in seaside recreation. Warm water, piped from the nearby phosphorus works operated by Albright and Wilson, enabled a reliable temperature of about 21 °C (70 °F), an unusual feature for an outdoor pool at the time in Britain. Attendance exceeded 100,000 in each of its first five seasons.

By the early 2000s visitor numbers had fallen sharply and North Somerset Council proposed permanent closure as part of wider budget reductions. A 2008 review panel calculated the council subsidy at £16.50 per swim and recommended closing the pool, a proposal considered by the executive that October and vigorously opposed by residents and the nascent trust. The announcement prompted the community-led Save the Open-air Pool (STOP) campaign, which subsequently formed the Portishead Pool Community Trust to negotiate a long-term lease.

=== Renovation and community takeover (2008–2010) ===
National publicity arrived in 2009 when the television series Ty Pennington’s Great British Adventure selected the threatened lido for a week-long makeover. More than 400 local volunteers worked with contractors to refurbish the pool, changing rooms and terrace, a project valued at about £250,000. Following the broadcast the council transferred day-to-day management to the new trust, and the lido re-opened for the 2010 season.

=== Restoration and investment (2011–present) ===
Attendance continued to recover, reaching a post-reopening record of 32,800 in 2013. In 2017 the trust secured £250,000 for major works including a complete pool liner, upgraded plant and new surrounds, extending the complex’s life by an estimated 30 years. The work included replacing the entire perimeter pipework and scum channels, installing modern skimmers, filtration system, and fitting a new pool liner.

Cold-water swimming has allowed the pool to extend its operating calendar and draw in additional revenue. Since 2016 the Portishead Popsicle gala has drawn costumed competitors each December, raising several thousand pounds annually for pool upkeep.

The 2020 season was delayed after the onset of the COVID-19 pandemic and associated restrictions. After being closed for more than a year, the pool reopened on 14 May 2021 with limited entry.

A further £1.33 million from the UK Government’s Community Ownership Fund was awarded in 2024 to modernise facilities and improve energy efficiency. The trust said the award would allow it to move from “limited, ad-hoc repairs” to a full modernisation programme, keeping the pool and Lido Café “fit for the future”. The trust has also joined local businesses and Portishead Town Council in opposing proposals by North Somerset Council to introduce parking charges on Esplanade Road, arguing that fees would deter volunteers and visitors essential to the lido’s operation.

== Facilities ==
The lido comprises a 33 metre main pool, a shallow learner pool, sun terraces and the Lido Café. It remains heated, now by a biomass boiler, allowing operation from spring through early autumn. All sessions are booked online, and in 2024 a standard family swim cost £5 per person, with under-threes admitted free.

== See also ==
- Tropicana, a former lido in nearby Weston-super-Mare that has been likened to the Portishead Open Air Pool in calls for its own restoration.
- History of lidos in the United Kingdom
