= Frank Sherwin =

Frank Sherwin may refer to:

- Frank Sherwin (politician) (1905–1981), Irish independent politician
- Frank Sherwin (artist) (1896–1986), English artist
