= Parliament Hill Lido =

Outdoor swimming pool in Camden, London

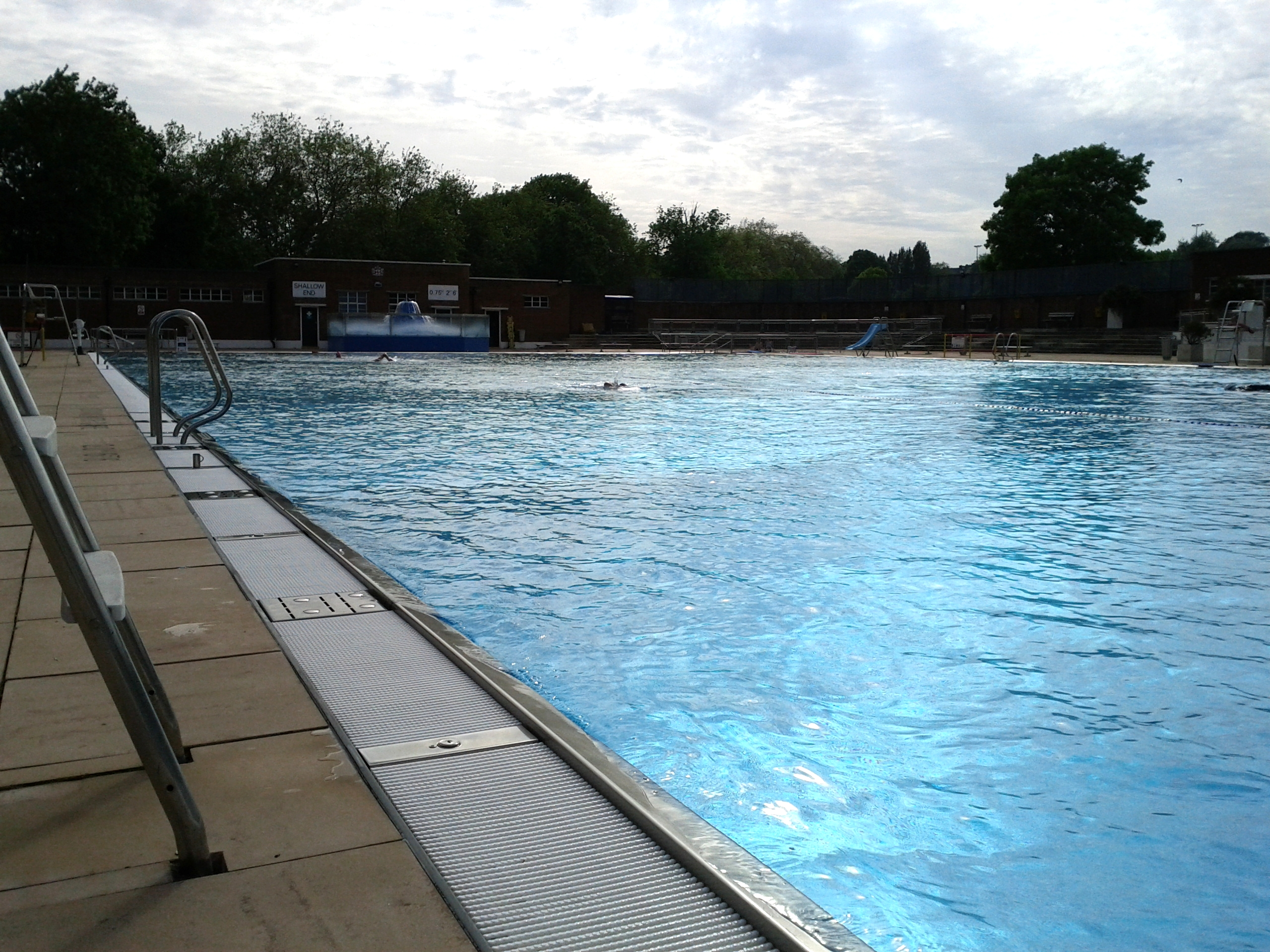
- Interactive map of Parliament Hill Lido
- Location: Parliament Hill Fields; Gordon House Road, NW5 1LP
- Coordinates: 51.556359°N 0.151379°W
- Operator: City of London Corporation
- Dimensions: Length: 61 metres (200 ft); Width: 27.4 metres (90 ft); Depth: 1 metre (3.3 ft) − 2 metres (6.6 ft)

Construction
- Opened: 1938

Website
- Official website

Parliament Hill Lido, located in Hampstead Heath, north London, is next to Gospel Oak railway station. The lido, also known as Hampstead Heath Lido, is a public unheated open air swimming pool, open for 12 months a year. It first opened in 1938.

== Description ==
This unheated pool is 200 by 90 feet (61 m × 27 m) and is owned and operated by the City of London Corporation, who also own the whole of Hampstead Heath.

The lido is open for the summer season from mid May to mid September.

From September to April it is open from 7am to 12 noon for early morning swims only, one of only three unheated winter swimming venues in London, the others being Brockwell Lido in Herne Hill and Tooting Bec Lido.

Another swimming venue, the Highgate Ponds are a short walk away.

There is a users' group for the lido (and the ponds), the United Swimmers' Association of Hampstead Heath.

== History ==
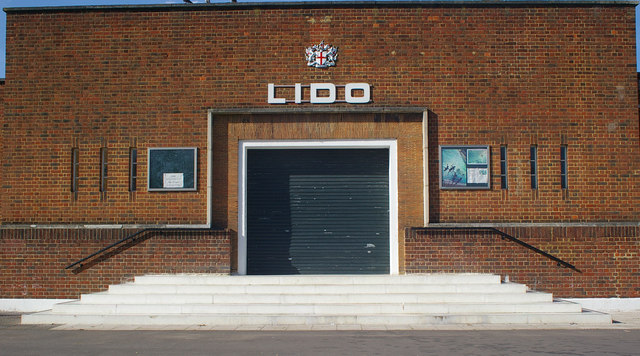
Lido frontage in 2007

The lido was opened on 20 August 1938. The lido was designed by Harry Rowbotham and T. L. Smithson (London County Council Parks Department) and is nearly identical in design to Victoria Park Lido and Brockwell Lido. There was a diving stage, chutes and a café, with areas for sunbathing and spectators.

Costing £34,000 to construct, this was the most expensive of the then London County Council's 13 lidos built in the 1920–39 period.

In 1976, after the murder of 15-year-old Enrico Sidoli, further safety measures were taken, including removing most of the diving facilities and increasing staff. The last diving board was removed in 2003.The murder of Enrico Sidoli by drowning has never been solved and a reward has been offered for information.

Refurbishments after the late 1980s included hot showers, cycle racks, a paddling pool and CCTV. In 1986, after the abolition of the Greater London Council (who had inherited ownership from the LCC), the lido was transferred to the London Residuary Body and then in 1989 to the Corporation of London.

The lido was Grade II listed in January 1999.

49,000 visitors were recorded in 2003.

In 2005, the custom for free swimming before 9.30am was dropped and a £2 entry fee introduced. Refurbishment in 2005 included a stainless steel pool lining, the first of its kind for an outdoor pool in Britain.
