= Sandford Parks Lido =

Outdoor swimming pool in Cheltenham, England

Coordinates: 51°53′36″N 02°04′12″W

Cheltenham Lido
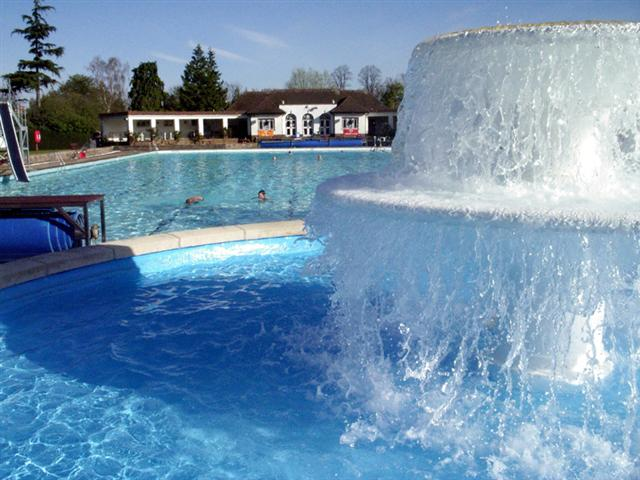
- Cheltenham Lido
- Interactive map of Cheltenham Lido
- Location: Keynsham Road, Cheltenham, England, GL53 7PU
- Type: Lido

Construction
- Opened: 1935

Website
- www.sandfordparkslido.org.uk

Cheltenham Lido is a Grade II Listed heated outdoor swimming pool in Cheltenham, England. The lido consists of a 50-metre main pool (with reserved lanes), a children's pool, and paddling pool. The main pool is heated to 24-26 °C and children's pool to 30 °C. The lido is open from March until October each year for the summer season (heated) and has been open from early November until early February over the winter for cold water swimming since 2021.

On 1 April 1996 a charitable trust, Sandford Lido Limited, took over operational control of Sandford Parks Lido signing a 25-year lease with Cheltenham Borough Council.

== History ==
Sandford Parks Lido was opened on 25 May 1935, beginning with a procession of open-top motor cars travelling from the Municipal Offices to the Lido, carrying the Mayor of Cheltenham and his wife, along with dignitaries from neighbouring cities and towns.

The heating of the pool was a unique feature and one of the first tasks of the staff was to stoke the coal fire boiler. As many Lidos in the country remain unheated, first-time visitors to Sandford Parks Lido are often surprised that the pool water is heated.

After the opening of indoor swimming facilities in Cheltenham, the future of the Lido came into question. There were times when the Lido would break even or show a slight surplus, however, after a poor summer in 1982 the Lido faced the first calls to close or to sell the site. Lido friends rallied round, a public petition was organised and the Lido was protected for the next few years.

By the early 1990s the Lido was under considerable threat again. Cheltenham Borough Council had carried out a feasibility study of the complex including a radar survey of both pools. The radar survey confirmed that both pools were on unstable ground and the repairs had failed. Structurally, they gave the main pool a life expectancy of only ten years.

In negotiation with Cheltenham Borough Council, a way forward was developed, and by 1996 a charitable Trust had been formed with members of the Friends of the Lido. On 1 April 1996 the trust took over operational control.

The Charity has invested over £370,000 on refurbishment and site improvements since taking control and by 2005, £250,000 had been raised from direct donations. Together with £50,000 from Gloucestershire Environmental Trust with Landfill Tax contributions from Cory Environmental Ltd and a Heritage Lottery Fund grant of £382,500, work was able to commence in September 2006 on the main pool refurbishment project. Following the 2007 United Kingdom floods the opening of the pool was delayed pending confirmation from Severn Trent Water authority that the water supply was clean enough to be used. The pool was finally opened on Wednesday 15 August 2007. Sandford Parks Lido won the Cheltenham Civic Awards for the restoration works. As of 2025, the Lido has been renamed to Cheltenham Lido.
