= R. W. H. Jones =

British architect

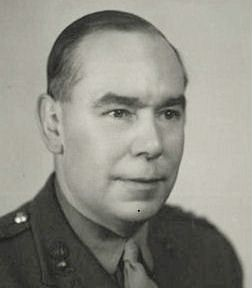
R.W.H. Jones, during World War II

Richard William Herbert Jones (1900–1965) commonly referred to as R. W. H. Jones, was a British architect who designed the lido and the Grand Ocean Hotel, both in Saltdean, Sussex, England. Both buildings were designed in the Modernist style.

Building magazine described Saltdean Lido as "one of the really first-class designs of its type in the country". It was completed in July 1938.

Jones' Ocean Hotel in Saltdean opened in July 1938 and has been likened to a "modern ocean liner run aground".

In addition, he was responsible for the design of residential properties in Saltdean including:

Teynham House, Chichester Road East
Curzon House, Chichester Road East
Marine View, Marine Drive
The Mount Estate, Saltdean
