= Ilkley Lido =

Open air swimming pool in Ilkley, England

Coordinates: 53°55′55″N 1°49′13″W

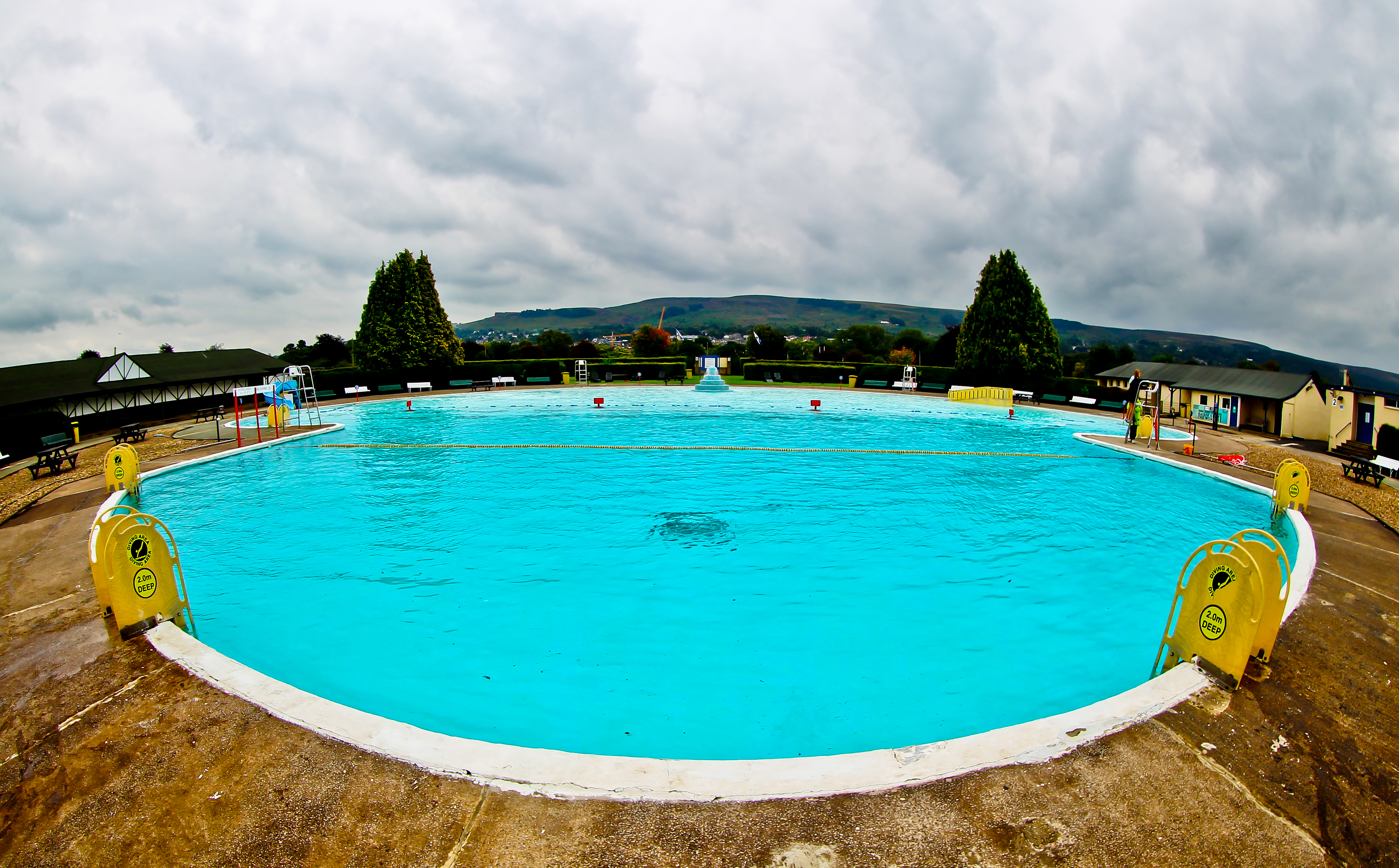
Ilkley Lido

Ilkley Lido is an open-air swimming pool in the West Yorkshire, England, spa town of Ilkley, part of a complex that also includes an indoor heated swimming pool, tennis courts, and a cafe. It was designed by Archibald Skinner and opened in May 1935 as part of the celebrations for the Silver Jubilee of George V. The lido is open from May to September and during the summer can attract up to 4,000 visitors a day. Ilkley Lido is designated Grade II listed status.

== Description ==
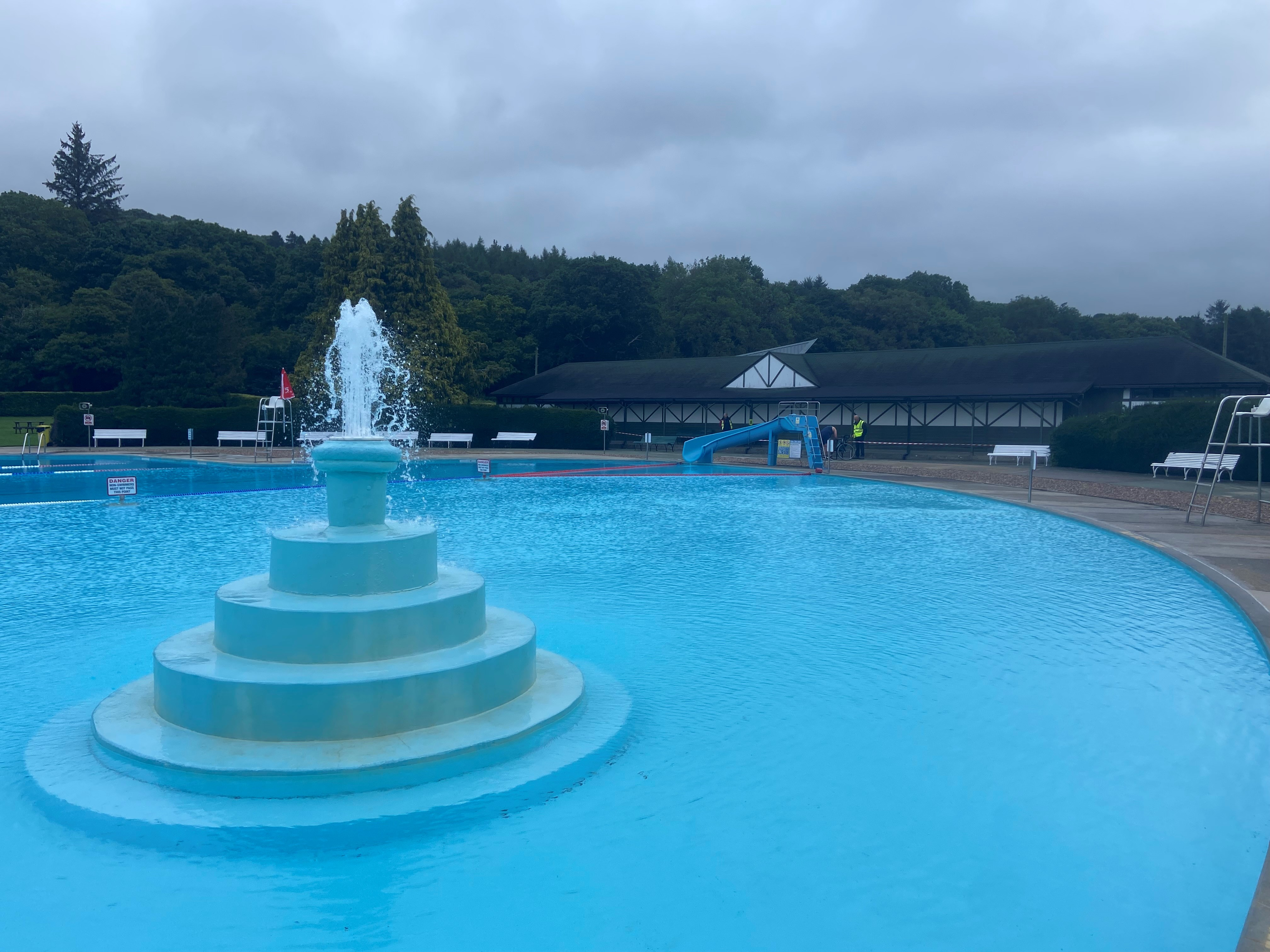
View of Ilkley Lido with fountain

The large pool is mushroom shaped with a shallow area for children, including slide, and deeper circular area 46 m in diameter. There is also a 'rare example of a still unscreened fountain' which was part of the original filtration system. The pool's Art Deco café built in August 1935 to cater for 100 people remains unchanged externally with glazed concertina doors and raised sun terrace that reflect the 1930s enthusiasm for outdoor leisure.

On each side of the pool are single-storey changing room blocks built in a timber-framed vernacular style, originally designated for ladies to the east and gentlemen to the west.

The site also includes an extensive picnic area, tennis courts, putting green, bowls and a 25mx11m heated indoor pool with spectator area.

== History ==
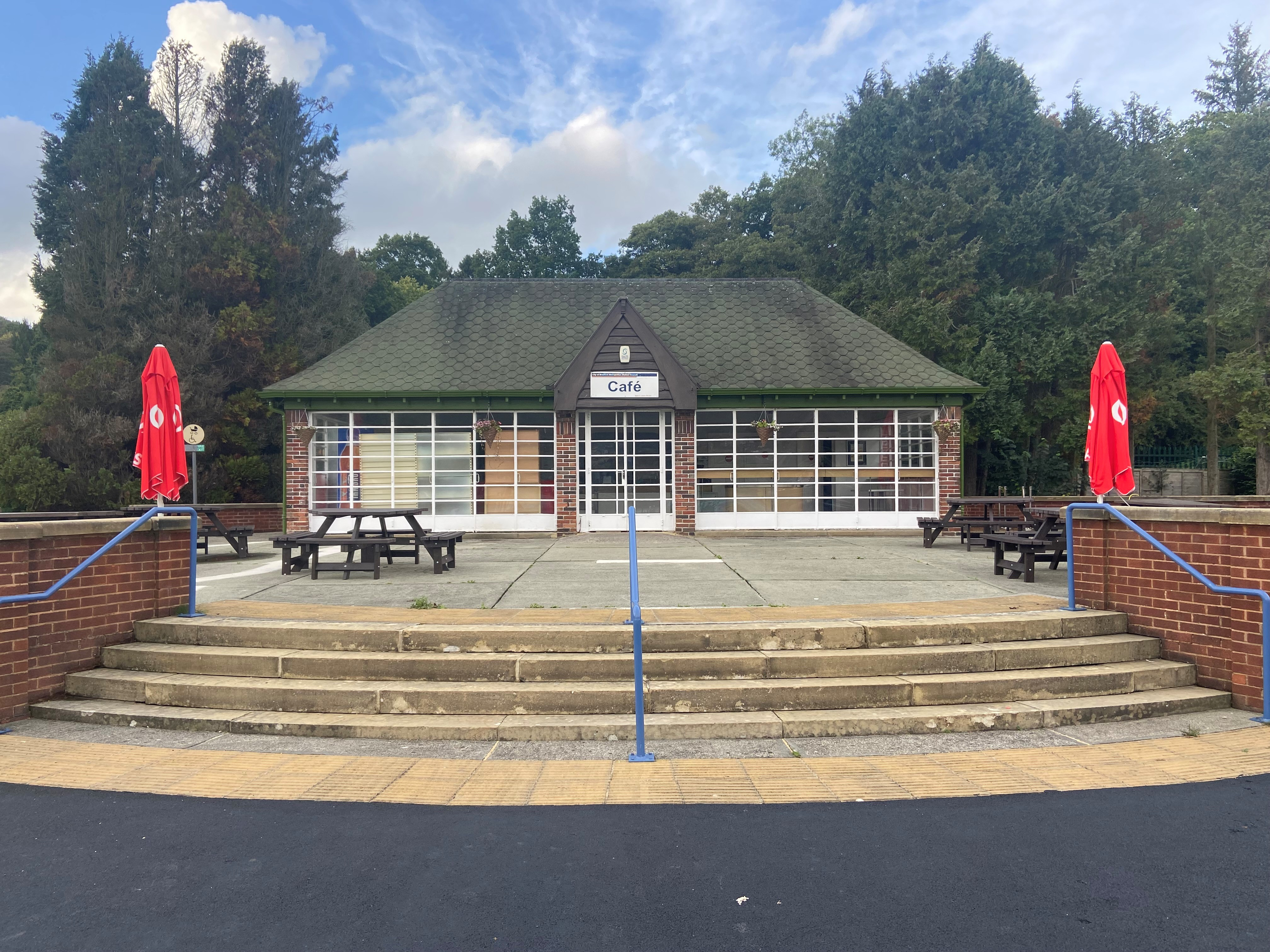
The Art Deco café at Ilkley Lido

Designed by Archie Skinner, Ilkley's surveyor and water engineer, building work started in 1934, and the lido was officially opened in May 1935 as part of the Silver Jubilee celebrations of King George V. Opening events to commemorate the jubilee included `ladies and gents graceful high dive' and `ladies neatest and smartest modern bathing costume'. The Art Deco café to the north of the pool opened in August 1935 seating 100 people with catering provided by Taylors of Harrogate.

In 1957 the artist Frank Sherwin was commissioned by British Railways to create a poster to promote Ilkley as a holiday destination with the tagline 'Ilkley – Gateway to the Yorkshire Dales'. In 1974 an indoor pool was added while the steel diving stage was dismantled following the Health and Safety at Work Act of 1974.

The lido has hosted the Ilkley Triathlon since the early 1990s, making it one of the longest-running sprint events in the country. Previous winners of the event include Olympic champions Alistair and Jonny Brownlee in 2004 and 2005 respectively.

== See also ==
- Listed buildings in Ilkley
