= John Avon =

Welsh fantasy and science fiction illustrator

- Born: 1961 (age 64–65); Cardiff, Wales
- Notable work: Magic: The Gathering
- Website: www.johnavon.com

John Avon (born 1961) is a Welsh fantasy and science fiction illustrator. His work has been compiled in the book Journeys to Somewhere Else and used for book covers, CD covers, games, toys and advertising campaigns. Avon is best known for his artworks for the collectible card game Magic: The Gathering, for which he has produced over 200 paintings.

== Life and work ==
Avon was born in Cardiff, Wales. He completed an art foundation course near to where he grew up in Cardiff, and gained a BA in graphic design in Brighton. He began his art career in 1983 with commercial advertising.

He has painted book covers for authors Stephen King, Terry Pratchett, Arthur C. Clark and Harry Harrison.

Avon is one of the most prolific Magic: The Gathering artists, having painted over 280 unique cards, mostly landscapes on Basic Land cards. For the World of Warcraft Trading Card Game, he created the image for the Water Elemental card which is used in Hearthstone.

In 2014 he successfully used the Kickstarter crowd funding website to raise funds for an illustrated book of his work, The Art of John Avon: Journeys to Somewhere Else (2015).

Avon is married to the illustrator Patricia MacCarthy, with whom he has two sons, Laurie and James, and lives in Saltdean, near Brighton and Hove, England. He also composes, plays and records music on the guitar and piano.

== Publications ==
- The Art of John Avon: Journeys to Somewhere Else. Self-published / John Avon Art, 2015. Illustrations by Avon. Compiled and with text by Avon and Guy Coulson. Hardback, ISBN 9780993109706. Deluxe edition of 500 copies, ISBN 9780993109713.
