= Frank Sherwin (artist) =

British artist (1896–1986)

- Born: May 19, 1896; Derby England
- Died: July 1, 1986 (aged 90); Slough Berkshire England
- Known for: Painting

Frank Sherwin (1896–1986) was a British artist from Derby best known for his railway posters promoting travel destinations in the British Isles. He was a member of the Royal Society of British Artists as well as the Royal Institute of Painters in Water Colours.

== Early life and education ==
Sherwin was born in Derby and grew up in a house named Elm Wood on Thornhill Road. His parents were Samuel and Fanny Sherwin. His father was a chemist who belonged to the Derby Sketching Club. He had three siblings and two live-in servants.

He studied at the Derby School of Art and then in Chelsea, London, at the Heatherleys School of Fine Art.

== Career ==
He specialised in watercolours, but is remembered for the railway posters which promoted travel to holiday destinations around Britain and were very much part of the railways in the days of steam. He did posters for GWR, LMS, LNER & British Rail.

During the war he was an advisor to the War Office on the camouflage of air fields. It is also said that some of his paintings were used in wartime posters.

In 1957, British Rail commissioned Sherwin to paint the Ilkey Lido for a poster.

== Personal life ==
For the last forty-six years of his life, Sherwin lived in Cookham village in Berkshire. Sherwin died in 1986 at Slough.

== Legacy ==
There was an exhibition of his work at the Cookham Festival in 2007. Cookham is also the village of Sir Stanley Spencer, one of England's most renowned artists.

In 2015, a rare 1939 railway poster signed by Frank Sherwin, with the words "Penzance in the Cornish Riviera" was expected to sell for 1,000 pounds at auction.
