= Tooting Bec Lido =

Lido in London Borough of Wandsworth, United Kingdom

Coordinates: 51°25′54″N 0°8′21″W

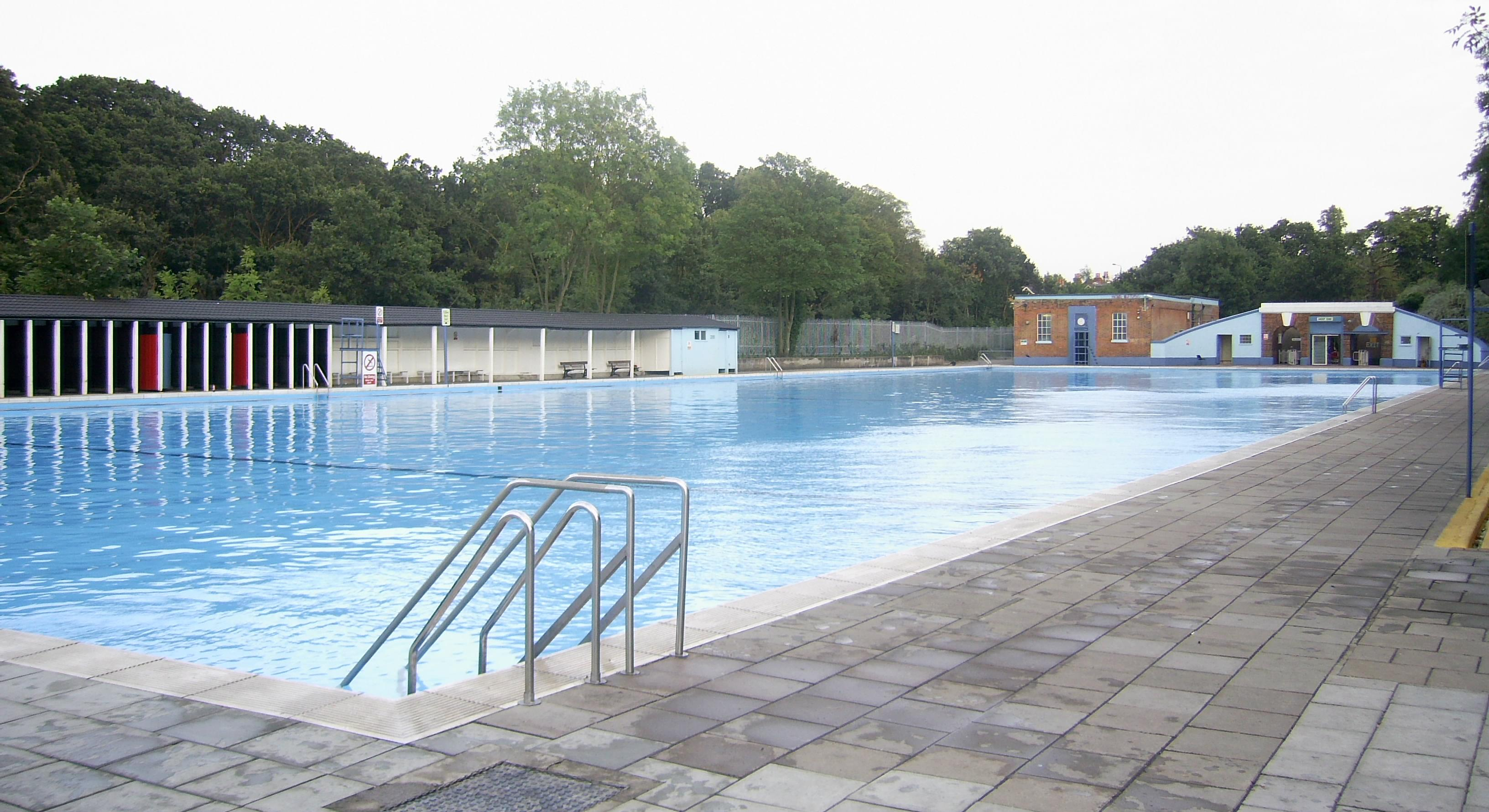
Tooting Bec Lido, from north (shallow) end, with the original entrance at the far end

Tooting Bec Lido is an open-air fresh water swimming pool in South London. It is the largest fresh water swimming pool by surface area in the United Kingdom, being 100 yd (91.4 m) long and 33 yd (30.2 m) wide.

The lido (swimming pool) is on Tooting Bec Common between Tooting and Streatham. An original condition of construction was that it should be concealed from views across the common by a surrounding earth ramp. This ramp is now largely covered with bird-filled trees, except where it is breached by the new entrance.

The alternating bright red, yellow, and green doors of the changing cubicles seen above the turquoise water make the Lido a popular location for advertisement "shoots" and other filming. Brad Pitt's boxing "pool" scene in Snatch was filmed at the Lido.

The Lido is operated and maintained by the London Borough of Wandsworth.

== Access ==
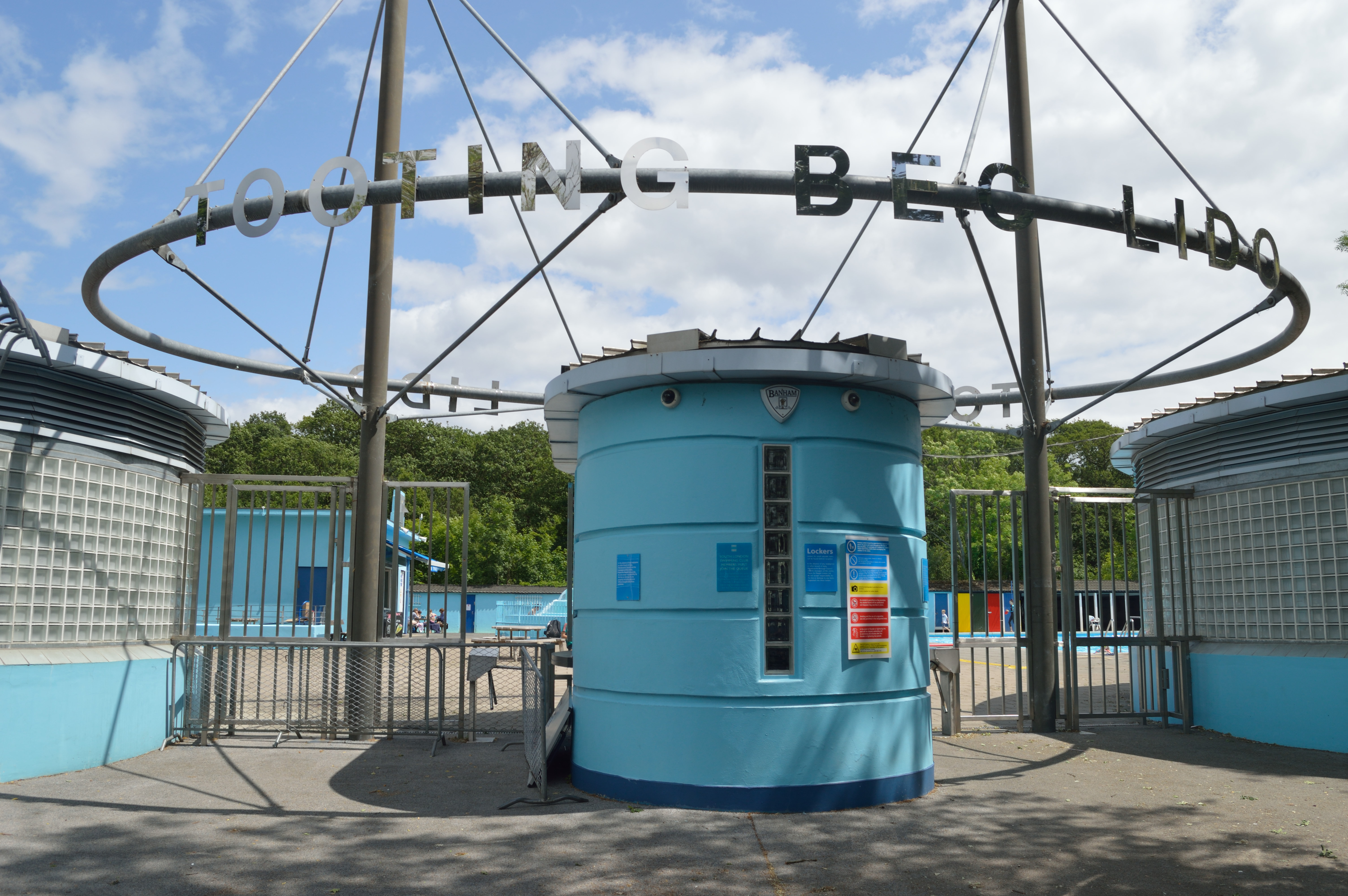
The entrance to Tooting Bec Lido

The Lido is open to the general public from late May to the end of September each year. Tooting Bec Lido is home to the South London Swimming Club (SLSC) who have exclusive use of the Lido during the winter months, when the pool is open between 7 am and 2 pm. Members of SLSC can gain free entry when the pool is open to the public in summer. Adult SLSC membership is currently (2024) priced at £70 plus £110 for an annual lido pass.

== History ==
Tooting Bec Lido is one of Britain's oldest open-air pools – it opened to the public on Saturday 28 July 1906 as the Tooting Bathing-Lake. Digging the lake had been proposed by the Reverend John Hendry Anderson, Rector of Tooting, as a project to provide work for unemployed local men. It holds one million gallons (4,500 m^{3}) of water.

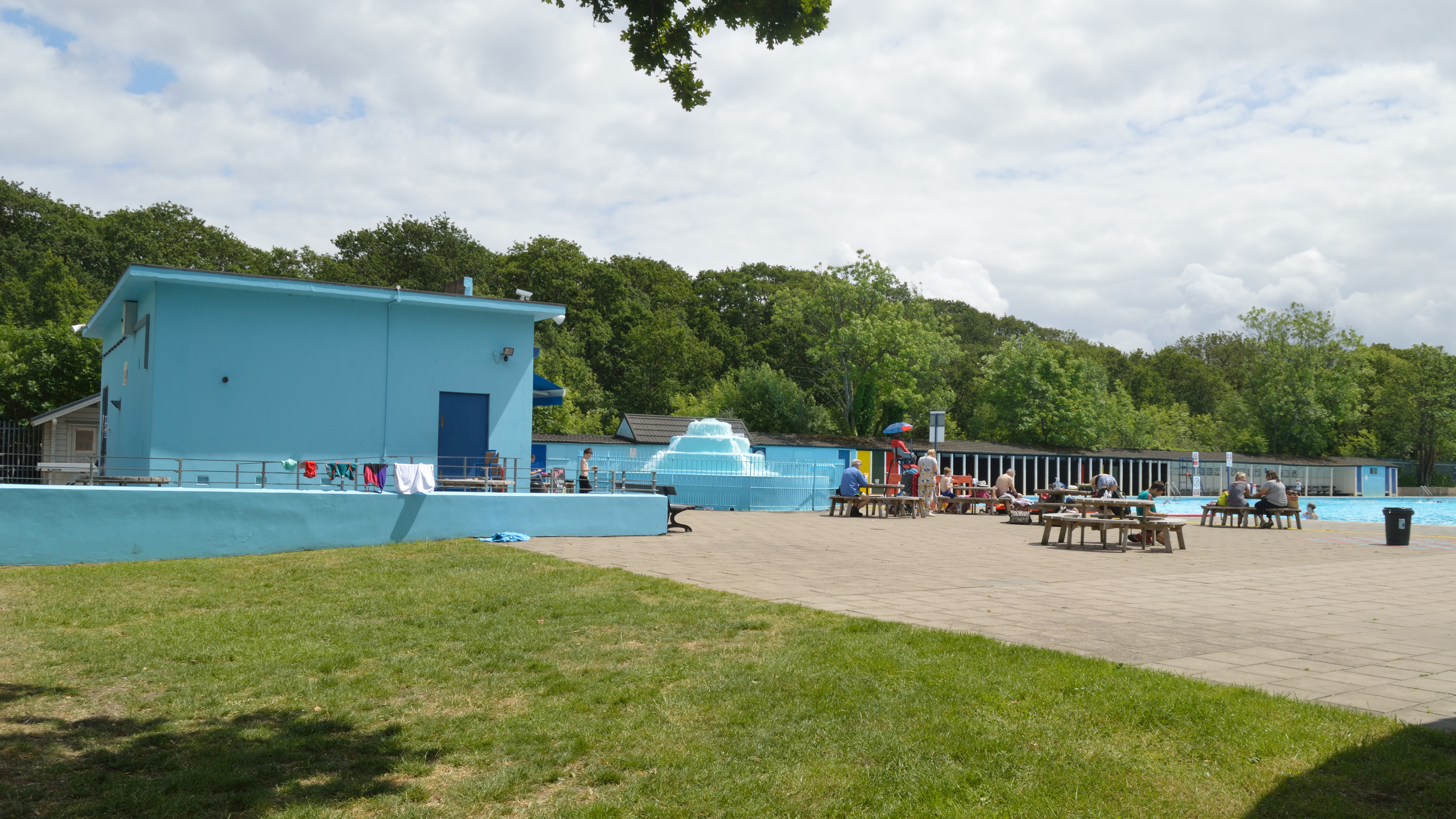
North standing and aerator

Segregation of the sexes was originally enforced, with women and girls confined to one morning a week. Mixed bathing was not introduced until 1931, and then only at specified times. At the same time an "aerator", or fountain, was added to help pump the water round the pool and keep it clean. The main reason given for this act of modernisation was that more women would be swimming in the pool and higher standards of hygiene were apparently needed.

Five years later in 1936, a cafe was built along with cubicles with proper doors. It was around this time that the pool became known as a "lido" (as this was when the term came into widespread use in England).

Tooting Bec Lido was nearly closed as a result of Wandsworth council's financial cutbacks in the early 1990s, which resulted in the closure of the borough's other lido at King George's Park. It was saved as a result of the campaigning efforts of the SLSC, who took over the management of the Lido outside the summer season.

Since 1999, Wandsworth council has invested in making improvements to the Lido. The most visible was the move of the public entrance to the northern "shallow end". This removed the need for children and non-swimmers to pass along the narrow paths at the southern "deep end". The new entrance, initially highly visible from across the Common, reduced the lido's sense of seclusion, and made the lido's northern terrace windier. Plantings of willow trees outside the entrance are starting to soften the visual impact.

The pool was drained and repainted in 2005 in advance of a summer programme of events to celebrate the Lido's centenary. More fundamental works to reline the pool and relay paving, requiring a prolonged closure period, took place over the winter of 2006–07. The Lido reopened to members of the SLSC in March 2007, when they hosted the Cold Water Championships.

In 2017, a new Pavilion building was constructed at the deep end of the pool on the site of the former entrance. This was funded by a large contribution from the accumulated reserves of the SLSC, grant support from SportEngland and funding from Wandsworth Council. The Pavilion provides a new all year round sports hall and improved facilities for the life guarding staff. Adjacent to the pavilion is some additional terrace space, where is it intended that the brick arches of the original entrance will be reconstructed as a memorial.

== See also ==
- History of lidos in the United Kingdom
- List of long course swimming pools in the United Kingdom
