= Tinside Lido =

Art Deco Lido in Plymouth, England

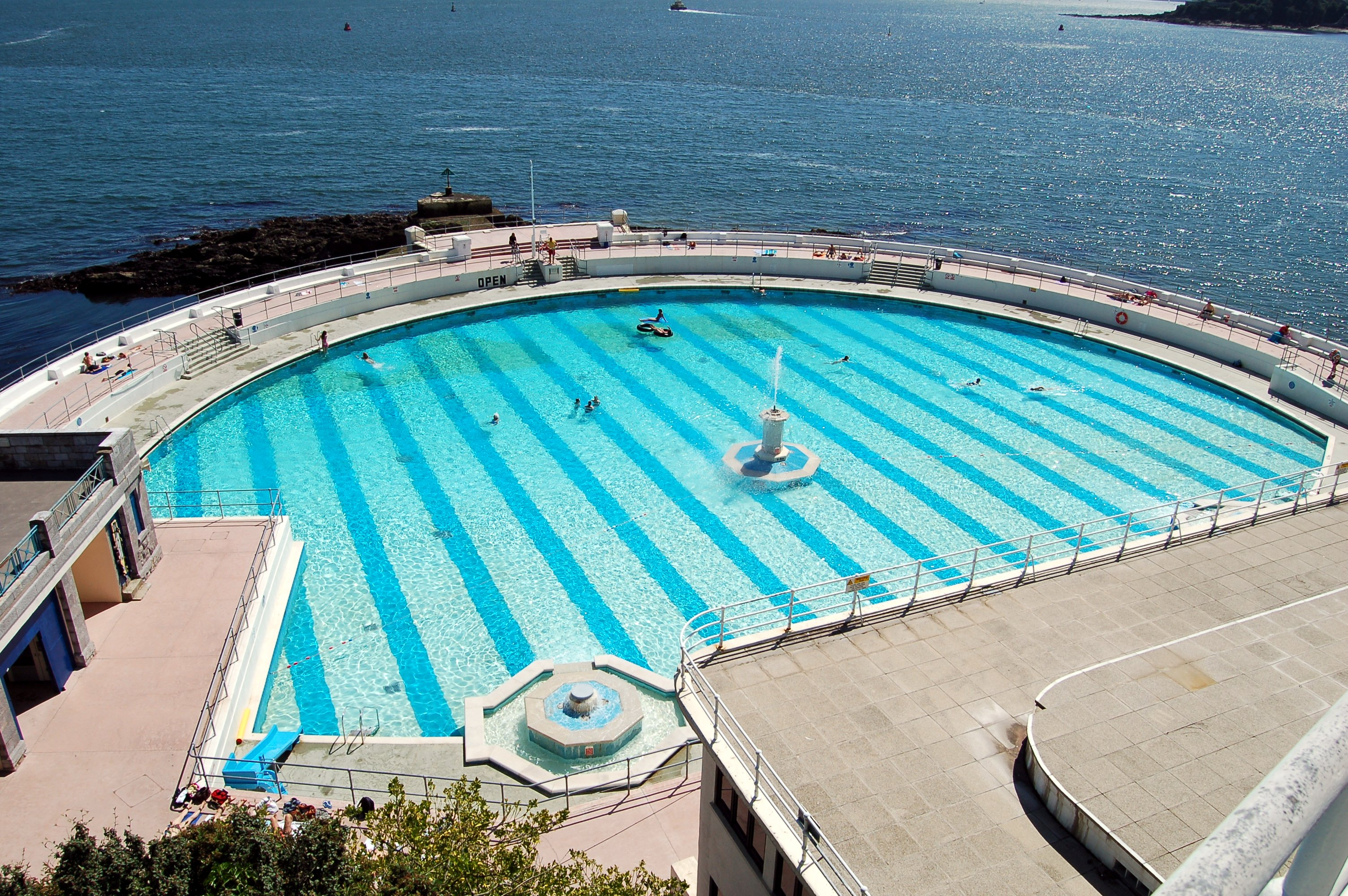
- Interactive map of Tinside Lido
- Location: Hoe Road, Plymouth, PL1 3DE
- Coordinates: 50.3631°N 4.142389°W
- Owner: Plymouth City Council
- Type: open-air, seawater
- Dimensions: Length: 180 feet (55 m); Depth: 2 feet (0.61 m) − 9 feet (2.7 m)

Construction
- Opened: October 2, 1935 (reopened 2005)
- Closed: 1992-2005
- Architect: John Wibberley (1878-1936)

Website
- www.plymouthactive.co.uk

Tinside Lido is a 1935 Art Deco lido in the city of Plymouth in southwest England. It is sited beside Plymouth Sound and is overlooked by Plymouth Hoe and Smeaton's Tower. The lido opens in the summer months between May and September.

== History ==
The lido was designed in 1935 by John Wibberley. It was officially opened on 2 October 1935

A victim of declining popularity and neglect, the lido closed in 1992 but a vociferous local campaign led to a renovation, at a cost of £3.4 million, and Grade II Listed Building status in 1998. The facility re-opened to the public in 2005. During refurbishment the three tidal pools, pontoons and diving boards were all removed or filled in.

A lift and hoist were added in 2009 for disabled access.

Since 2022, Tinside Lido has been operated by Plymouth Active, a local organization managing sports and leisure facilities in the area. For bookings and more information, visitors can access the official website at www.plymouthactive.co.uk

The lido is currently undergoing refurbishment, including facilities for conferences and marine education; due to reopen in Spring 2025.

== Description ==
The lido design is a semicircle of 180 feet (55 metres) diameter.

The site comprises a concrete pool, counter-fort outer walls, reinforced concrete inner walls, duct walls and floors. The main building is reinforced with concrete and has some stone retaining walls. The semi-circular pool has projecting jetties, and at the entrance, there are circular cutwaters separated by steps. The changing rooms are in the art deco style and have square metal windows and a staircase. The pool has three fountains and is surrounded by cast-iron railings.

The pool is used to celebrate the summer solstice, when it attracts its largest crowds.
