= Saltdean =

Village in Brighton, East Sussex, England

Coordinates: 50.8030°N 0.0411°W

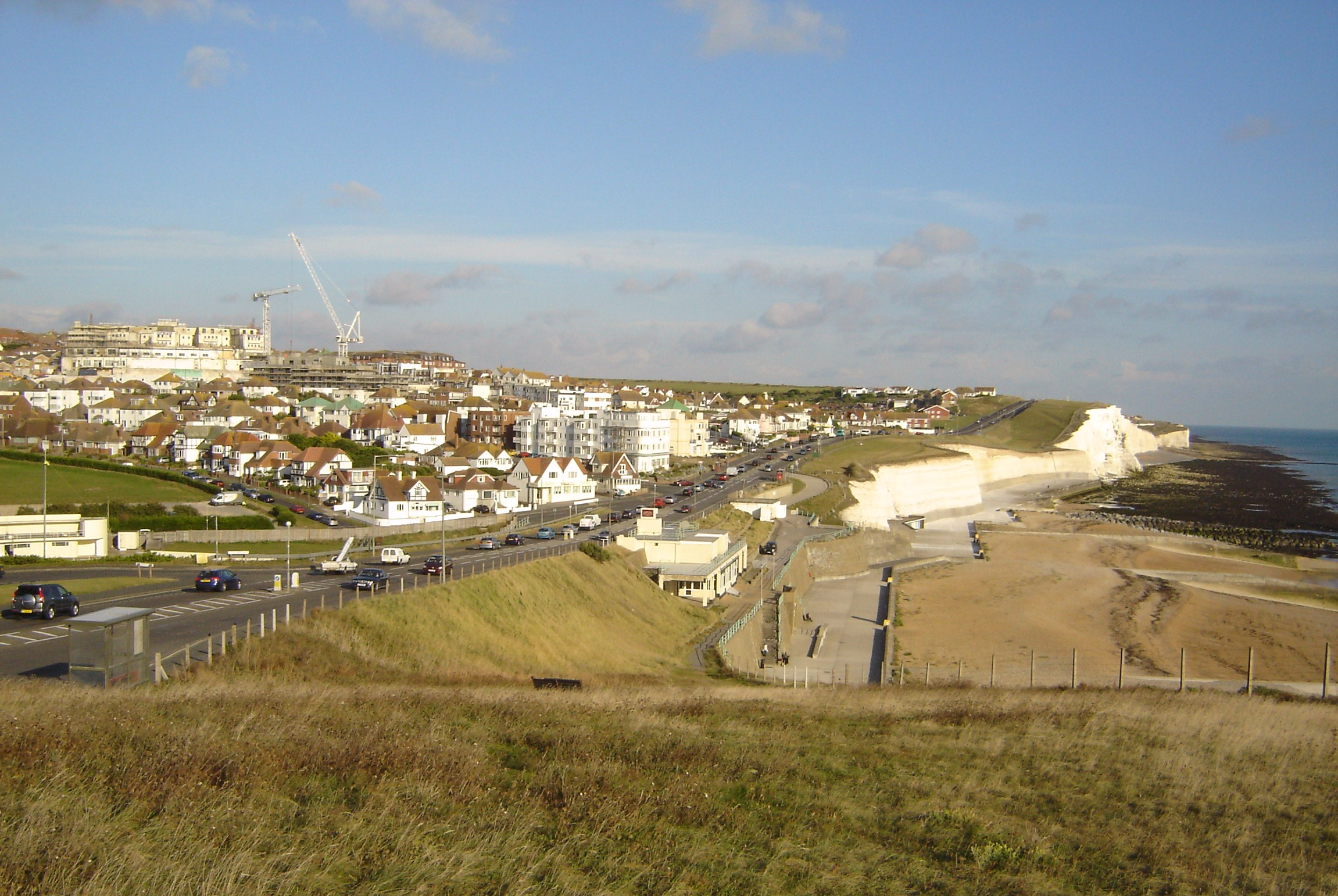
- Looking towards Saltdean from the cliff top

- Location within East Sussex
- District: Brighton and Hove (Saltdean), Lewes (East Saltdean),
- Ceremonial county: East Sussex
- Region: South East
- Country: England
- Sovereign state: United Kingdom
- Post town: BRIGHTON
- Postcode district: BN2
- Dialling code: 01273
- Police: Sussex
- Fire: East Sussex
- Ambulance: South East Coast
- UK Parliament: Brighton Kemptown

Saltdean is a coastal village largely within the city of Brighton and Hove, with part (East Saltdean) located in Lewes district. Saltdean is approximately 5 miles (8 km) east of central Brighton, 5 miles (8 km) west of Newhaven, and 6 miles (9.7 km) south of Lewes. It is bordered by farmland and the South Downs National Park.

== History ==
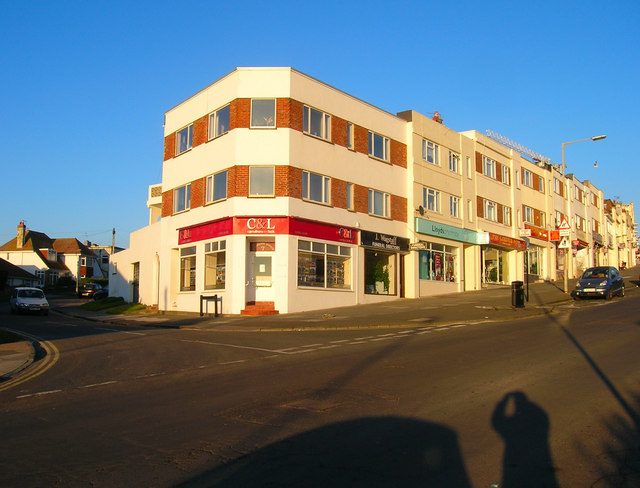
Shops on Longridge Avenue

Saltdean was open farmland, originally a part of the village of Rottingdean, and almost uninhabited until 1924 when land was sold off for speculative housing and property development. Some of this was promoted by entrepreneur Charles W. Neville, who had set up a company to develop the site (he also eventually built nearby towns Peacehaven and parts of Rottingdean).

Saltdean has a mainly shingle beach, fronted by a promenade, the Undercliff Walk, which can be reached directly from the cliff top, by steps from the coast road, or by a subway tunnel from the nearby Lido. The Undercliff Walk continues to Brighton, ending by the Palace Pier. The buildings nearest the beach are the most architecturally varied, and include some influenced by international trends of the inter-war years, e.g. Bauhaus and Cubism, and there are some which are Spanish influenced.

The best known building is the grade II* listed Saltdean Lido community centre, which includes a public library and iconic open air swimming-pool, designed by architect R. W. H. Jones. He also designed other buildings in the area, including the former Grand Ocean Hotel, built using Art Deco 'ocean liner' architecture.

In 1928 most of Saltdean became a district of the then town of Brighton. Later on it became a part of the city of Brighton & Hove. Saltdean east of Longridge Avenue is administratively part of neighbouring Lewes District Council.

In July 2025 a consultation was launched over proposals to bring East Saltdean, Telscombe Cliffs, and Peacehaven into Brighton and Hove.

== Geography ==
Saltdean is situated by the sea in a 'Dean' (Saxon/Old English for 'dry valley'), with the surrounding hills of the South Downs National Park forming a large central dip and valley where the oval shaped Saltdean Park and Lido are located, looking out over the adjacent sea.

Tree lined roads and avenues radiate out in wide oval curves from the park in order to follow the contours of the local topography. The plan of the village was designed from inception to vary considerably from neighbouring Peacehaven's more grid-like system.

== Transport ==
Bus company Brighton & Hove provides frequent buses through Saltdean, operating route 27 that links Saltdean to Withdean via Brighton city centre and Brighton station. Saltdean is also served by other Brighton & Hove routes 12, 13 and 14 (as well as their variants) that run along the A259 to destinations including Peacehaven, Seaford and Eastbourne.

The Big Lemon bus company provides route 47 that links Saltdean to Hangleton. Saltdean is directly connected to the A259 road, which runs south of the village.

== Education ==
The only school in Saltdean is Saltdean Primary School. There is also a library located in the Lido Community building.

== Sport and leisure ==
Saltdean has a non-League football club Saltdean United F.C. who play at Hill Park. Saltdean also has four hard tennis courts, an outdoor Bowls green, a basketball court, and a skateboard park all located within Saltdean Park. A sea swimming group meets weekly on the beach and holds traditional Boxing Day and New Year's Day swims. Saltdean also has their own Surf Life Saving club, Saltdean Swim & Surf Club, who meet throughout the year.

== Notable people ==
=== Historic figures ===
- Alfred Lynch (1931–2003), actor
- John Nathan-Turner (1947–2002), TV producer
- Manning O'Brine (c.1913-c.1977), writer
- George Robey (1869–1954), music hall comedian
- Pat Coombs (1926-2002) actress

=== Living people ===
- Glenn Fabry, comics artist
- John Avon, illustrator
- Dennis Burnett, footballer
- Simon Raymonde (Cocteau Twins), musician
- Celeste, singer-songwriter
- Amer Deghayes, an Al-Nusra Front member
- Abdullah Deghayes, an Al-Nusra Front member
- Jaffar Deghayes, an Al-Nusra Front member
