= Ty Pennington's Great British Adventure =

- Also known as: Ty's Great British Adventure
- Genre: Reality
- Country of origin: United Kingdom
- No. of series: 3
- No. of episodes: 15

Production
- Running time: 60 minutes (first episode); 30 minutes

Original release
- Network: UKTV Style
- Release: 16 September 2008 – 2010

Ty Pennington's Great British Adventure is a British television reality show on Home, produced by UKTV in association with Twofour, featuring Ty Pennington of Extreme Makeover: Home Edition fame.

== Episodes ==
=== Series One ===
Portreath, Cornwall
1 x 60 mins and 4 x 30 mins
Filmed: May 2008, Broadcast: 16 September – 14 October 2008

Pennington attempts to restore the fortunes of a faded seaside resort.

Note: The 60-minute episode from this series aired in the U.S. on ABC on 7 August 2011.

=== Series Two ===
Portishead Open Air Pool
5 x 30 mins
Filmed: May 2009, Broadcast: 14 September – 12 October 2009
Ty helps the community of Portishead, in North Somerset, to reopen their derelict open air swimming pool as a community Lido. This is now open as Portishead Open Air Pool.

=== Series Three ===
Kiln Green and Castleholm, Langholm, Scotland
5 x 30 mins
Filmed: May 2009, Broadcast Spring 2010
Ty helps a community to build a bandstand, construct a new path, open a tourist centre and put on a music festival.
