= Brockwell Lido =

Swimming pool in the London Borough of Lambeth, England

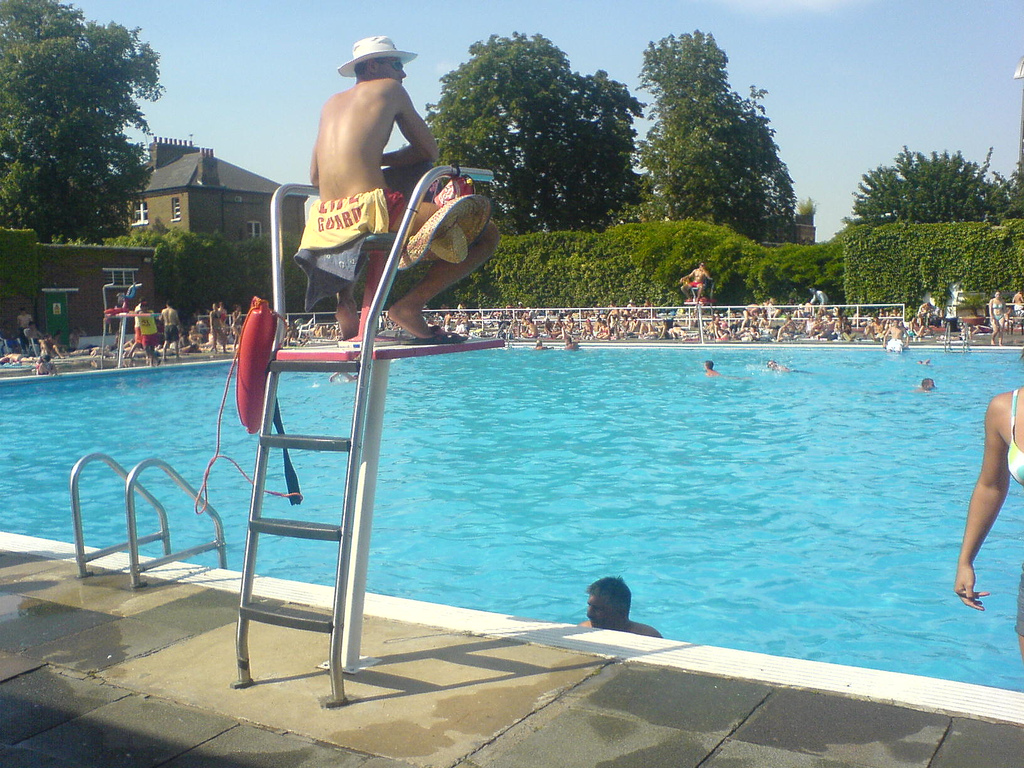
- Interactive map of Brockwell Lido
- Location: Brockwell Park, Herne Hill, Lambeth, SE24 0PA
- Coordinates: 51.453056°N 0.106389°W
- Operator: Fusion Lifestyle Ltd
- Type: open air
- Facilities: Gym, hydrotherapy pool, cafe
- Dimensions: Length: 164 feet (50 m)

Construction
- Opened: 1937
- Architect: Rowbotham & Smithson

Website
- https://www.fusion-lifestyle.com/centres/brockwell-lido/

Brockwell Lido is a large lido in Brockwell Park, Herne Hill, London. It opened in July 1937, closed in 1990 and after a local campaign was re-opened in 1994. Since 2003, it has been managed on behalf of Lambeth Council by Fusion Lifestyle.

The Lido Cafe looks out onto the pool.

== History ==
Brockwell Lido was designed by Harry Rowbotham and T. L. Smithson in the Moderne style for the London County Council's Parks Department. It replaced the Brockwell Park bathing pond and is almost identical in design to the Victoria Park Lido in Hackney. It opened in July 1937.

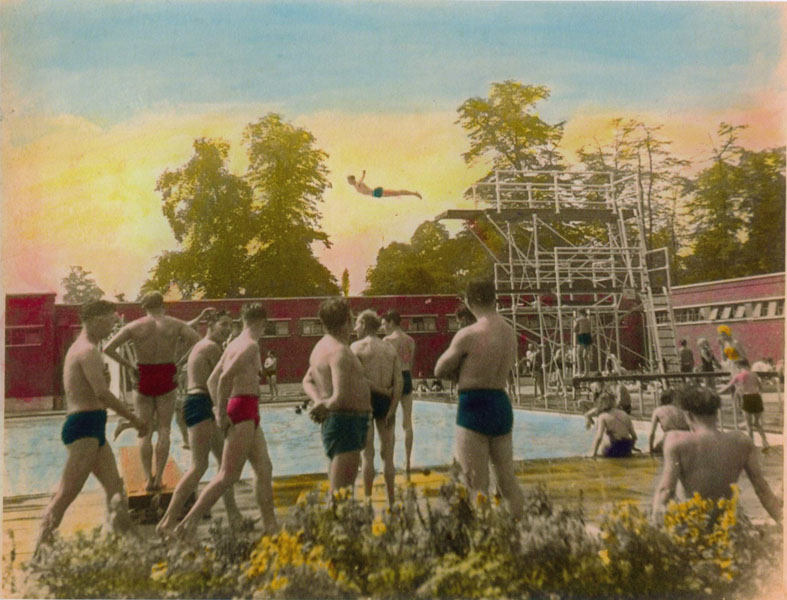
Brockwell Lido in 1938, colourized archive photo

The lido closed in 1990 due to cost-saving measures by Lambeth Borough Council. The lido management was put out for tender and two former council employees won the contract and reopened the lido in 1994.

The lido has been listed Grade II on the National Heritage List for England since July 2003.

In 2001, the Evian logo was painted on the pool floor in a sponsorship deal worth £110,000. In 2005, £500,000 was awarded from the Heritage Lottery Fund as part of the £2.5 million redevelopment.

2001 was also the year Brockwell Lido Users Group were officially formed as a pressure group to save the lido.

In 2003 Fusion Lifestyle won the competitive tender from Lambeth Council to refurbish the lido and create an all year round leisure complex at the site. A newly built gym, spa and fitness studios were constructed over four years and the newly expanded Brockwell Lido site was reopened in October 2007.

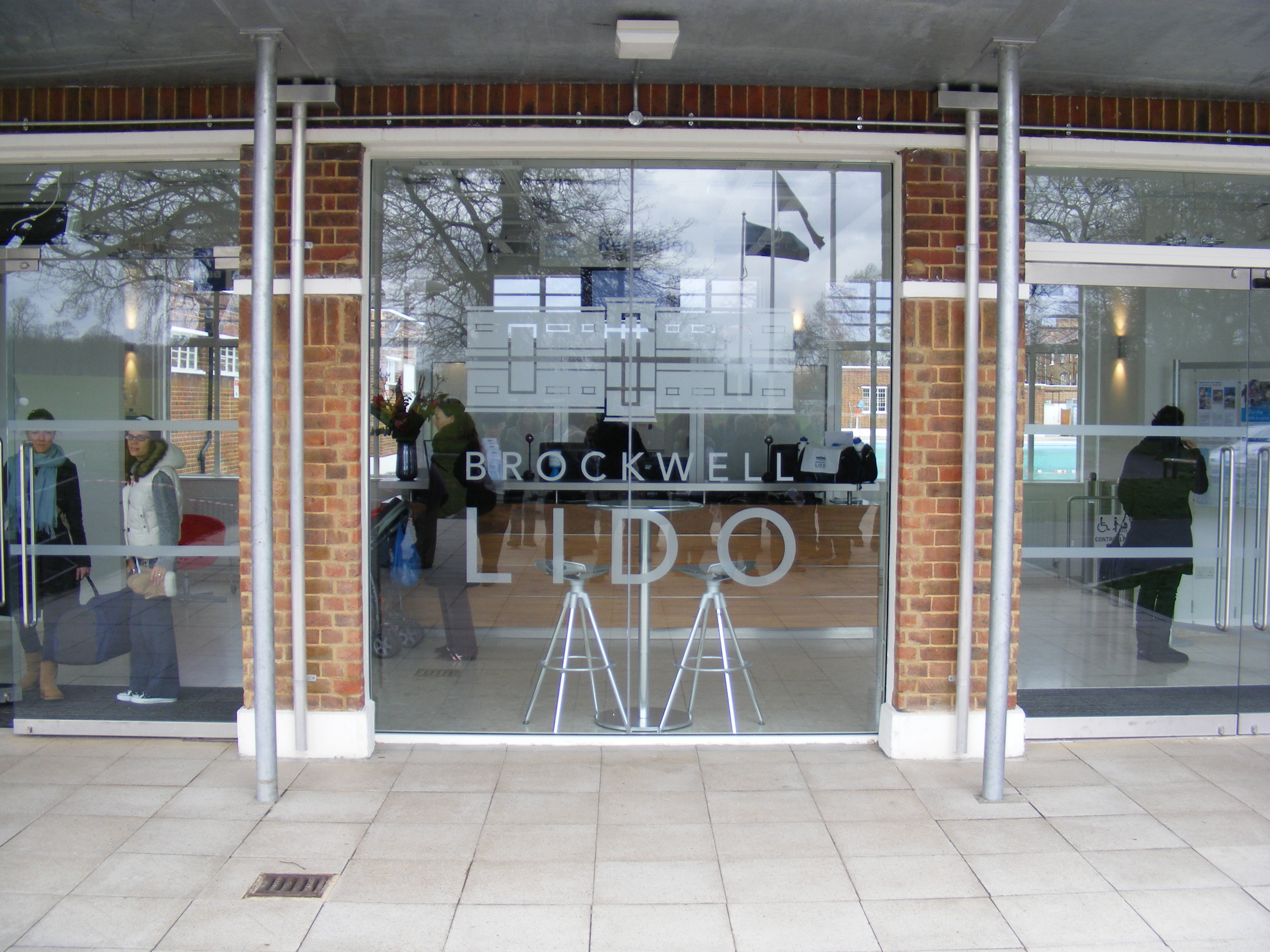
Brockwell Lido entrance in 2008

In 2012 the Brockwell Icicles winter swimming group reformed and campaigned for all year round swimming.

The Brockwell Swimmers club was formed in January 2016 by a group of lido users keen to see more swimming activities.

On 25 July 2019, amidst record high temperatures across the UK, the police were called as around 500 people tried to "storm" the Lido.

After entering administration on April 1, 2026 Fusion Lifestyle ended operations and the Lido was temporarily run by the administrators S&W Partners.

Lambeth Council "Active Lambeth" officially took over the running of the Lido on the 1st July 2026 promising their "priority is to maintain continuity of service, protect public access and secure the long term future of the Lido".

== In popular culture ==
The lido is featured in a 1995 episode of the acclaimed BBC series Modern Times, directed by Lucy Blakstad.

The lido also featured in the promotional video for the song "No Way, No Way", by influential girl band Vanilla. The song was notable for winning the "Worst Music Video Ever" title at the 1997 ITV Chart Show end-of-year special.

The lido is the setting for the episode "Sun Hill Boulevard" of the UK TV series The Bill, originally shown on ITV in August 1999.

== See also ==
- History of lidos in the United Kingdom

== Bibliography ==
- Bradley, Peter (2007), Out of the blue: a celebration of Brockwell Park Lido 1937–2007, BLU, ISBN 978-0-9556270-0-2
