= Saltdean Lido =

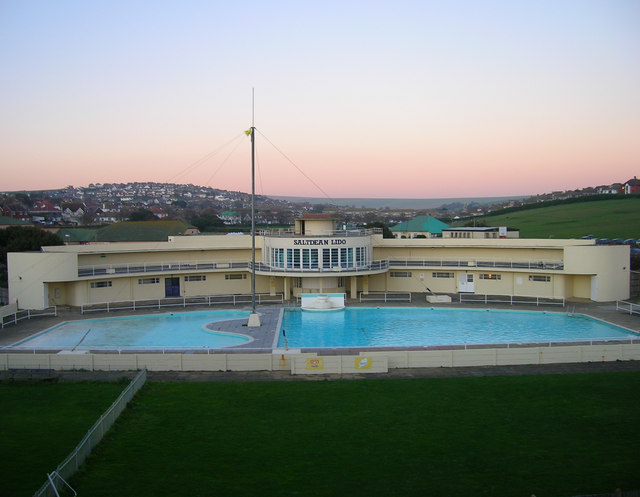
- The lido from the south

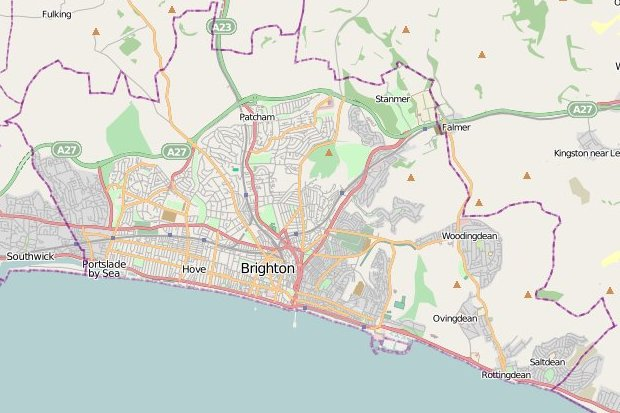
- Location of Saltdean within Brighton and Hove
- 50.801335°N 0.042162°W
- Location: Saltdean Park Road, Saltdean, Brighton and Hove, England

History
- Built: 1938

Site notes
- Architect: R.W.H. Jones

Listed Building – Grade II*
- Official name: Saltdean Lido
- Designated: 18 March 2011
- Reference no.: 1380905

Saltdean Lido at Saltdean Park Road, Saltdean, in the city of Brighton and Hove, in the ceremonial county of East Sussex, England, is an Art Deco lido designed by architect R.W.H. Jones. Originally listed at Grade II by English Heritage for its architectural and historical importance, its status was upgraded further to "Grade II*" on 18 March 2011.

The Art Deco design has been described by The Daily Telegraph as "particularly glorious, with its elegant, curved lines – rather like a stately ocean liner."

== Description ==
The pool measures 140 by 66 feet (43 m × 20 m) and can accommodate 500 bathers.

== History ==
The lido was built in 1937–38 to designs by the architect Richard Jones, and was hailed as the most innovative design of its type in Britain. With its tea terrace, sun deck, and café perched on the flat roof and distinctive curved wings at either end, it became the only lido to be featured in the Design Museum in London.

In 1958, Butlins attempted to buy the derelict lido for development. The application was opposed by residents and eventually rejected by the Ministry of Housing.

In 1998, the lido was reopened by Sports Minister Tony Banks. The restoration was achieved through a public and private sector partnership costing £2 million. Banks revealed he had a personal link to the Grade II listed building through his mother, who used to visit it during the Second World War. He said: "Open air sites are not able to attract National Lottery funding, so the money for this had to come through private investors having the vision to bring a piece of our heritage back into use." The reopening ceremony came two days after the lido let in its first visitors for three years.

On 18 March 2011, John Penrose, the Minister for Tourism and Heritage in the Department for Culture, Media and Sport, approved the upgrade of Saltdean Lido's listed status from Grade II to the second highest grade, Grade II*. Such buildings are defined as being "particularly important ... [and] of more than special interest".

On 30 May 2012, it was announced that the ownership of the Lido would be handed back by leaseholder Dennis Audley to Brighton and Hove City Council after legal discussions.

In November 2014, the Lido was given £49,500 from the Big Lottery Fund after it won a public vote on the television programme The People's Millions, a collaboration between the Big Lottery Fund and the broadcaster ITV. It was stated that the money would be spent on refurbishing the children's paddling pool, which had been disused since 1997.

After an extensive campaign by local residents, the Save Saltdean Lido Campaign successfully lobbied the freeholders of the site (Brighton & Hove City Council) to stop housing development and take back the lease on the site. Following a 9-month procurement process the Saltdean Lido Community Interest Company (set up by the campaign group) took ownership of a 60-year lease in 2014.

The lido reopened in 2017.

== See also ==
- Grade II* listed buildings in Brighton and Hove
- The De La Warr Pavilion
- Art Deco

== Bibliography ==
- Collis, Rose (2010). The New Encyclopaedia of Brighton. (based on the original by Tim Carder) (1st ed.). Brighton: Brighton & Hove Libraries. ISBN 978-0-9564664-0-2.
- Smith, Janet (2006). Liquid assets: the lidos and open air swimming pools of Britain. English Heritage. ISBN 0-9547445-0-0. Pages 146-151
- Douglas D'Enno (1985). The Saltdean story. Phillimore. ISBN 0-85033-573-6.
