= Lido (swimming pool) =

Public outdoor swimming pool

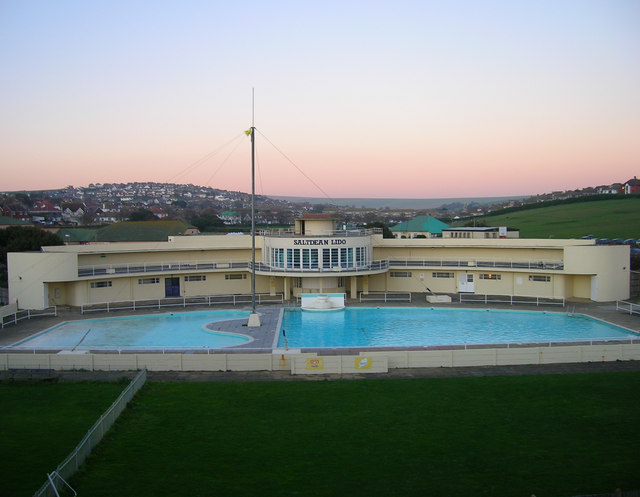
Saltdean Lido, Brighton and Hove, England

In British English, a lido (/ˈliːdoʊ/ LEE-doh, /ˈlaɪdoʊ/ LY-doh) is a public outdoor swimming pool and surrounding facilities, or part of a beach where people can swim, lie in the sun, or participate in water sports. On a cruise ship or ocean liner, the lido deck features outdoor pools and related facilities.

The term probably made its way into English via "Lansbury's Lido", a nickname used in the British press for London's Serpentine bathing place. The bathing place was revamped in 1930 as a project of the Labour First Commissioner for Works, George Lansbury. The re-opening garnered significant press attention as a result of Lansbury's introduction of "mixed" bathing. A plaque to Lansbury was commissioned in the 1950s and still appeared on the Serpentine pavilion as of September 2023.

Lido, an Italian word for "beach", forms part of the place names of several Italian seaside towns known for their beaches, such as Lido di Venezia, the barrier beach enclosing the Venetian Lagoon. Like the Lido di Venezia, the Serpentine "Lido" includes an extended area of shoreline.

== See also ==
- History of lidos in the United Kingdom
- List of long course swimming pools in the United Kingdom
