= Aquatics GB =

UK sports governing body

- Sport: Aquatics
- Category: Sports governing body
- Jurisdiction: National
- Membership: Swim England; Swim Wales; Scottish Swimming
- Founded: 2014
- Affiliation: FINA; LEN; British Olympic Association; British Paralympic Association
- Headquarters: SportPark
- Location: 3 Oakwood Drive, Loughborough, Leicestershire, LE11 3QF
- Chairperson: Karen Webb Moss
- CEO: Drew Barrand
- Coach: Swimming; Chris Spice; Para-Swimming; Chris Furber; Diving; Alexei Evangulov; Artistic; Karen Thorpe
- Replaced: Amateur Swimming Federation of Great Britain (ASFGB)

Official website
- aquaticsgb.com
- (United Kingdom)

Aquatics GB (formerly British Swimming) is the national governing body of swimming, water polo, artistic swimming, diving and open water in Great Britain. Aquatics GB is a federation of the national governing bodies of England (Swim England), Scotland (Scottish Swimming), and Wales (Swim Wales). These three are collectively known as the Home Country National Governing Bodies.

For international swimming purposes, competitive swimming in Northern Ireland falls under the Irish swimming federation, Swim Ireland, and as such Aquatics GB represents Great Britain, rather than the United Kingdom. For the Olympic Games, Northern Irish swimmers may opt to compete for Aquatics GB.

Aquatics GB is a member of World Aquatics, LEN, the British Olympic Association and the British Paralympic Association, and has responsibility for elite performance, doping control and international relationships and events for the sports within Great Britain. The Home Country National Governing Bodies are affiliated to Aquatics GB and are responsible for all other management of the sports in their respective countries from the learn to swim programmes up to performance development.

== History ==
British Swimming (as it was known at the time) became the primary organisation for Great British swimming in 2014, previously the Amateur Swimming Association (ASA) had been responsible for elite swimming.

In 2024, the organisation underwent a rebranding and was renamed Aquatics GB to oversee five disciplines of swimming, diving, para-swimming, artistic swimming and water polo.

== Championships ==
Aquatics GB organises championships every year in each of the sporting disciplines.

=== Swimming ===
Long course

Short course

The Aquatics GB Short Course Championships were usually held in August or September each year, though the event has not been held since 2004

Year	Dates	Venue
2001	9–12 August	Norwich
2002	12–15 September	Cambridge
2003	14–17 August	Grand Central Pools, Stockport
2004	26–29 August	Aquatics Centre, Manchester

=== Water polo ===
Domestic water polo competition in the UK is centred on the National Water Polo League (NWPL) and National Women's Water Polo League (NWWPL), which operate through the autumn and winter. The British Championships organised by British Swimming are held in the Spring. Winners of the championships in recent years are listed below.

British Championships

Extended content

Year	Men's champions	Women's champions
1996	Bristol	N/A
1997	Bristol	N/A
1998	Bristol	N/A
1999	Lancaster	N/A
2000	Lancaster	N/A
2001	Bristol	N/A
2002	Penguin	N/A
2003	Lancaster	N/A
2004	Lancaster	N/A
2005	Lancaster	Sheffield
2006	Lancaster	City of Sheffield
2007	Lancaster	?
2008	Rotherham	Manchester
2009	Lancaster	Manchester

=== Masters swimming ===
An annual championships for Masters swimmers is organised in rotation by the Home Countries, usually in June, for senior (18–24 yrs) and masters (25 yrs+). The championships are held in a long course (50 m) pool.

Extended content

Year	Dates	Venue
1987	9–11 October	Afan Lido Pool, Aberavon
1988	4–5 November	Dundee
1989	3–5 November	Coventry Sports and Leisure Centre, Coventry
1990	November	Wales Empire Pool, Cardiff
1991	July	Leeds International Pool, Leeds
1992	5–7 June	Crystal Palace National Sports Centre, London
1993	4–6 June	Wales Empire Pool, Cardiff
1994	3–5 June	Leeds International Pool, Leeds
1995	2–4 June	Crystal Palace National Sports Centre, Crystal Palace, London
1996	26–28 April	Ponds Forge, Sheffield
1997	6–8 June	Wales Empire Pool, Cardiff
1998	29–31 May	Tollcross International Swimming Centre, Glasgow
1999	4–6 June	Coventry Sports and Leisure Centre, Coventry
2000	2–4 June	Crystal Palace National Sports Centre, Crystal Palace, London
2001	1–3 June	Tollcross International Swimming Centre, Glasgow
2002	31 May–2 June	Crystal Palace National Sports Centre, Crystal Palace, London
2003	6–8 June	Welsh National Pool, Swansea
2004	23–25 April	Aquatics Centre, Manchester
2005	3–5 June	Tollcross International Swimming Centre, Glasgow
2006	16–18 June	Aquatics Centre, Manchester
2007	15–17 June	Aquatics Centre, Manchester
2008	20–22 June	Aquatics Centre, Manchester
2009	19 June	Cardiff International Pool, Cardiff
2010	18–20 June	Tollcross International Swimming Centre, Glasgow
2011	17–19 June	John Charles Centre for Sport, Leeds
2012	4–6 May	Ponds Forge, Sheffield
2013	14–16 June	Plymouth Life Centre, Plymouth
2014	13–15 June	Welsh National Pool, Swansea
2015	12–14 June	Aquatics Centre, Manchester

=== Open water swimming ===
Alongside the Open Water Grand Prix series, Aquatics GB also arranges national championship events over 5 km and 10 km.

=== Diving ===
The British Diving Championships are held annually in the winter. Sometimes the annual championships are held in the December of the preceding calendar year.

=== Synchronised swimming ===
The British Synchronised Swimming Championships are usually held in November or December each year.

Extended content

Year	Dates	Venue
2004	6–7 November	Gala Baths, Walsall
2005	5–6 November	Braunstone LC, Leicester
2006	2–3 December	Gloucester LC, Gloucester
2007	1–2 December	Gloucester LC, Gloucester
2008	6–7 December	Gloucester LC, Gloucester
2009	5–6 December	Gloucester LC, Gloucester
2010	3–5 December	Gloucester LC, Gloucester
2011	2–4 December	Gloucester LC, Gloucester

== Sponsorship ==
In 2009, Aquatics GB announced a £15 million, 6 year sponsorship deal with British Gas. It also announced sponsorship with Kellogg's and Speedo in 2009. In 2016, Aquatics GB announced a new sponsorship deal with TYR Sport, Inc.

== See also ==
- British records in swimming
- List of Olympic size swimming pools in the United Kingdom
