= List of sport venues in Cardiff =

This is a list of sport venues in the city of Cardiff, capital of Wales.

== Ice Arena Wales ==
The Ice Arena Wales, also currently known as the Vindico Arena for sponsorship reasons, is a public ice rink that is part of the Cardiff International Sports Village (ISV) in Cardiff Bay. It has a capacity of 3,100 for ice hockey and is the home venue of the Cardiff Devils. The Ice Arena, which replaced the Wales National Ice Rink demolished – as part of the Cardiff city centre St David's 2 retail scheme – opened 12th March 2016 for the Cardiff Devils v Belfast Giants game, after a number of delays.

Cardiff Arena, operated by Planet Ice, was a temporary structure that remained open whilst the new arena was built in the ISV. This venue has now closed and been demolished. It has been replaced by the permanent ice arena.

Planet Ice were originally tasked to run the rink as well as design and build it, however following delays, Cardiff Council cancelled the tender and awarded it to Green bank Partnerships. Since opening the rink has been run by Ice Arena (Wales) Limited.

== Cardiff Arms Park ==
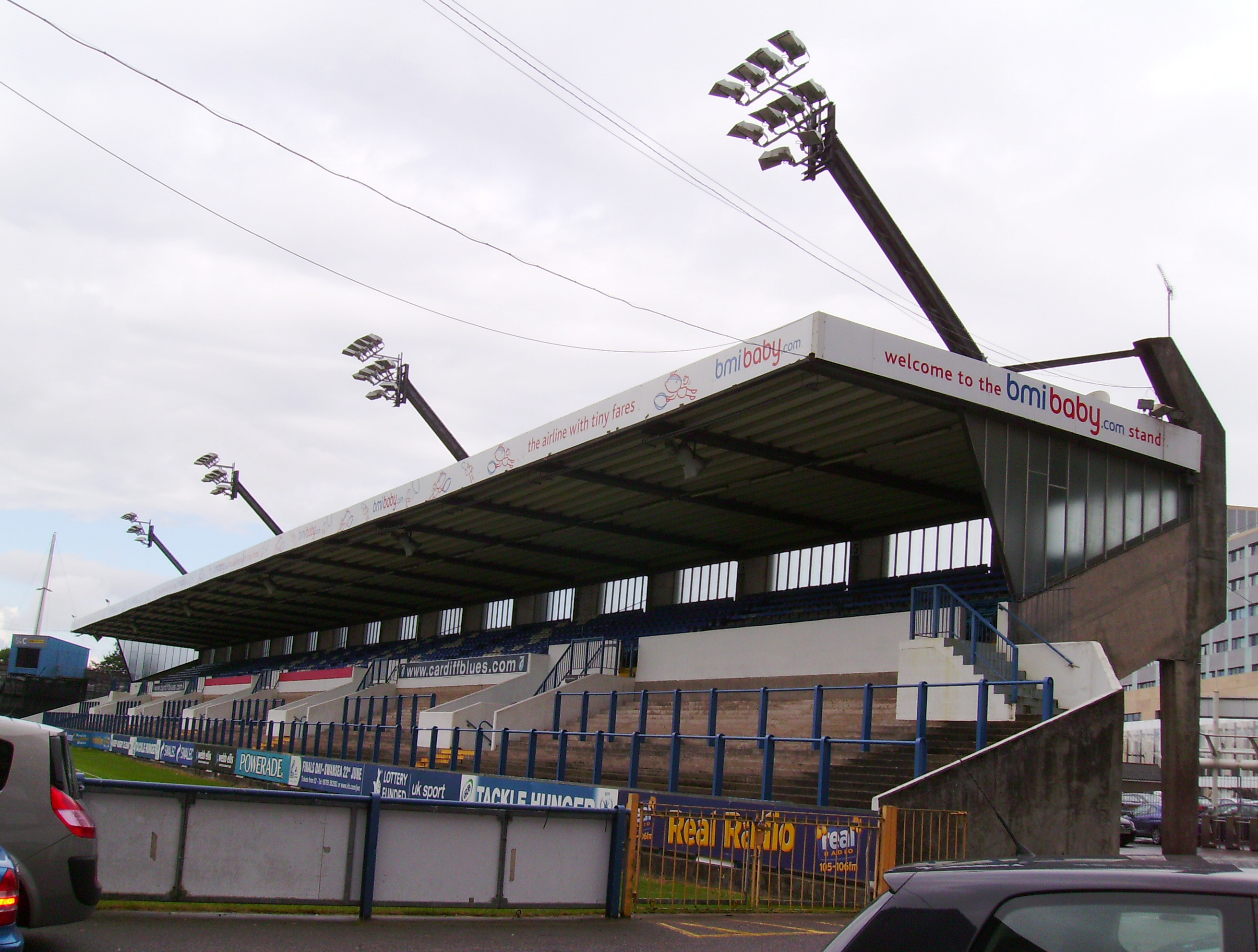
Cardiff Arms Park

Cardiff Arms Park is a rugby union stadium situated in the city centre. One of rugby union's most famous stadiums, it is home to Cardiff RFC and Cardiff Rugby. Previously the site had two stadiums: the Cardiff Rugby Ground and also the National Stadium. Until 1966 it was also home to the only Welsh first-class cricket club, Glamorgan County Cricket Club.

The Arms Park officially opened on 7 April 1984, but by 1999 the Millennium Stadium, which was the fourth redevelopment of the Cardiff Arms Park site since 1881, had replaced it as the national stadium of Wales. The future of the remaining Cardiff Rugby Ground had been in doubt since the announcement in 2007 that the Cardiff Blues would be moving to the new Cardiff City stadium. Cardiff Blues moved back to the Arms Park following the 2011-12 season.

The site has been host to many sports apart from rugby union and cricket, including athletics, association football, greyhound racing, tennis, British baseball and boxing. The National Stadium also hosted many music concerts including The Rolling Stones, U2 and Michael Jackson.

== Cardiff City Stadium ==
Cardiff City Stadium (Welsh: Stadiwm Dinas Caerdydd) is a 33,250 all-seated ground in the Leckwith area of the city, which is the home of Cardiff City Football Club. Owned and operated by Cardiff City F.C., the stadium also hosts the home matches of the Wales national football team. After the Millennium Stadium, it is the second largest stadium in Cardiff and in Wales. The stadium is part of the Leckwith development. A branded sponsor name will be assigned as and when the naming rights sell. The stadium was officially opened on 22 July 2009, with Cardiff City drawing 0–0 in a friendly against Celtic.

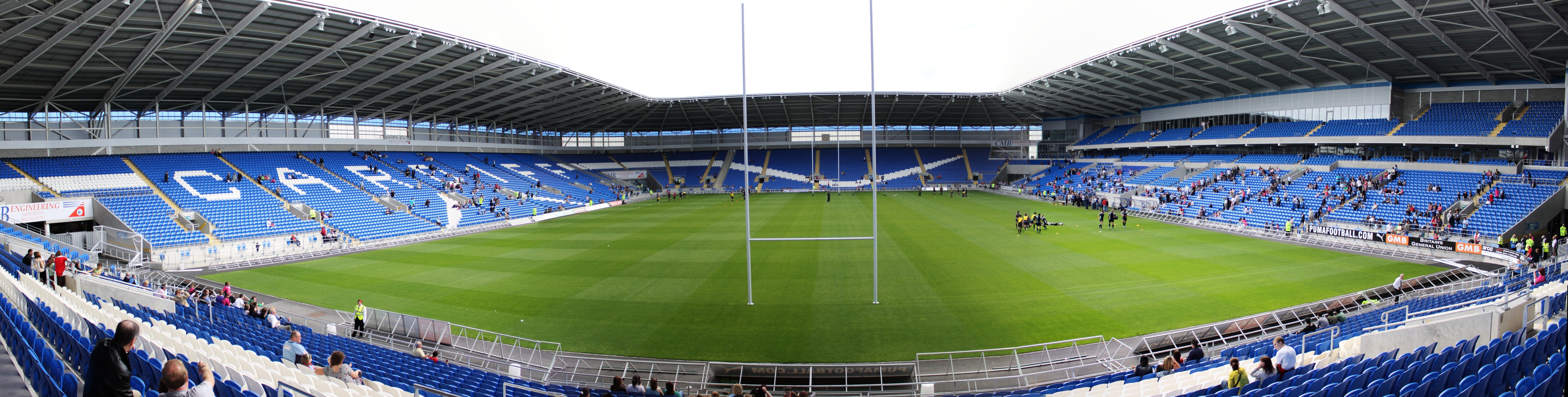
Inside the Cardiff City Stadium

== Municipal leisure centres ==
Channel View Leisure Centre in Grangetown has been open since 2002. The centre includes three badminton courts, a squash court, a climbing wall, a fitness suite and an outdoor all weather 5-a-side pitch. Other activities available at the centre include badminton and netball.

Eastern Leisure Centre (Welsh: Canolfan Hamdden y Dwyrain) in Llanrumney has been open since 1982. The centre comprises a 25 metres (82 ft) swimming pool, six badminton and five squash courts, a multi-use sports hall, a fitness suite and an outdoor tarmac 5-a-side pitch. Other activities available at the centre include bowls, netball, table tennis, trampolining and gymnastics. Sports clubs using the Eastern Leisure Centre include City of Cardiff Swimming Club and Cardiff Volleyball Club.

Fairwater Leisure Centre (Canolfan Hamdden Tyllgoed) opened in 1983. The centre comprises a 25 metres (82 ft) swimming pool, four badminton and four squash courts, a sports hall, a fitness suite and an outdoor skate park. Other activities available at the centre include gymnastics, trampolining and soccer. Sports clubs either based at, or using Fairwater Leisure Centre include the BBC football club, Cardiff Triathletes and City of Cardiff Swimming Club.

Llanishen Leisure Centre (Canolfan Hamdden Llanisien), the county's largest, opened in 1987. The centre comprises a leisure pool with wave machine, six badminton and three squash courts, a multi-use sports hall, a fitness suite and mini gym. Other activities available at the centre include gymnastics, trampolining and soccer.

Pentwyn Leisure Centre (Canolfan Hamdden Pentwyn) opened in 1989. The centre comprises a leisure pool with wave machine, three badminton and three squash courts, a multi-use sports hall, a fitness suite and an outdoor skate park. Other activities available at the centre include basketball, bowls, gymnastics and trampolining.

Star Centre (Canolfan Star) in Splott opened in 1981 and was taken over, and refurbished, by Cardiff council in 2001. The centre includes six badminton courts, basketball, netball and indoor 5-a-side courts, a gymnasium and a fitness suite. Other activities available at the centre include trampolining and table tennis. Sports clubs based at the Star Centre include the Capital Gymnastics Club.

Western Leisure Centre (Canolfan Hamdden y Gorllewin) in Caerau opened in 1979 and was refurbished in 2008. The centre comprises a 25 metres (82 ft) swimming pool, a gymnasium/fitness suite and an outdoor floodlit multi-use games area (MUGA). Activities available at the centre include basketball, football, gymnastics, tennis and trampolining. Sports clubs based at the Western Leisure Centre include Western Warriors Swimming Club.

== Cardiff City House of Sport ==
There is a further plan to develop HOS3 which will provide additional disability and niche sport facility provision to the City of Cardiff and will also serve to help grow the current sports education provision at the House of Sport. The Phase III Hall will extend and build on the principles and philosophies of the two current successful facilities and will adjoin phases I and II, expanding House of Sport coaching centre into new and niche sporting areas. The new House of Sport Hall will be constructed for a capital cost of £1.5m.

== Cardiff Gol Football Centre ==
Gol Cardiff is Cardiff's and Wales' only indigenous 5-a-side and 7-a-side company and launched the country's first purpose-built football facility in Cardiff in January 2006. They were also the first company in Wales to make 3G rubber crumb pitches publicly available. In April 2016, Gol Cardiff introduced innovative video technology which has allowed them to capture up to 10 league games per night, with all clips captured uploaded to YouTube.

== Cardiff International Sports Campus ==
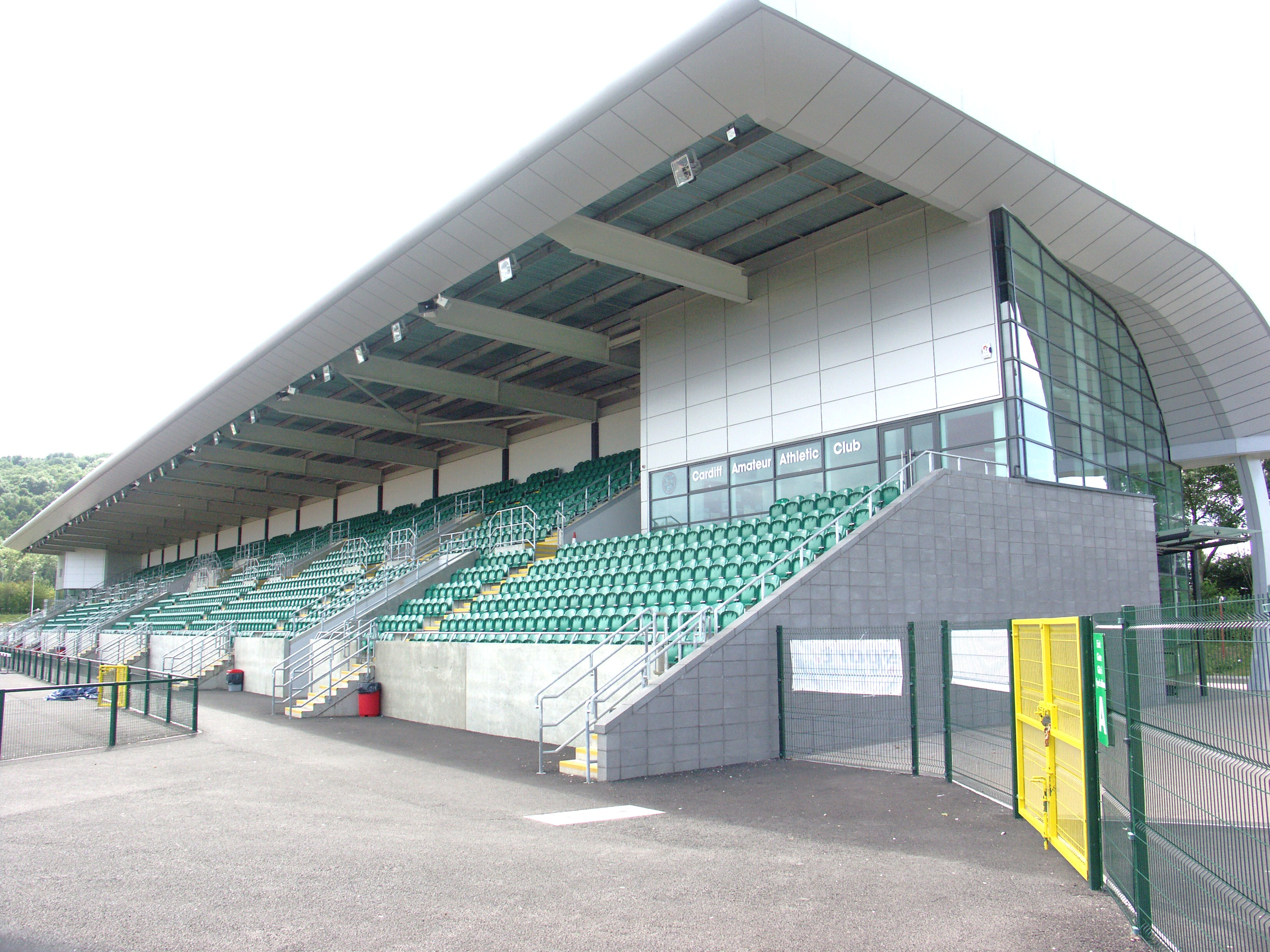
Cardiff International Sports Stadium

The Cardiff International Sports Stadium, opened 19 January 2009, replacing the Cardiff Athletics Stadium (demolished to make way for the Cardiff City Stadium) is a 4953 capacity, multi sport/special event venue, offering fully certificated international track and field facilities, including an international standard external throws area. The stadium houses the Headquarters of Welsh Athletics – the sport's governing body for Wales – and the Cardiff Amateur Athletic Club (Cardiff AAC).

Cardiff Council has approved a proposal put forward by Cardiff and Vale College and the Cardiff City House of Sport to lease Cardiff International Sports Campus.

== Cardiff International Sports Village ==
When complete, in addition to the Cardiff International Pool, the International Sports Village (ISV) complex will provide Olympic standard facilities for sports including boxing and fencing, gymnastics, judo, white water events (including canoeing and kayaking) and wrestling as well as a snow dome with real snow for skiing and snowboarding, an arena for public ice skating and ice hockey, and a hotel. Some of the facilities at the ISV were used as training venues for the London 2012 Olympics.

== Cardiff International Pool ==
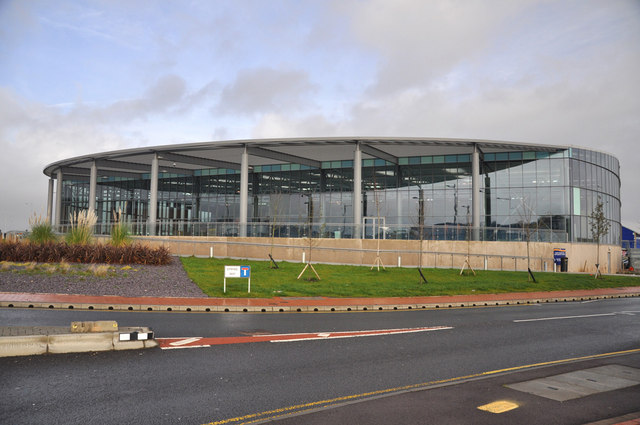
Cardiff International Pool

The GBP32m Cardiff International Pool in Cardiff Bay – part of the GBP1bn International Sports Village (ISV) – is the only Olympic-standard swimming pool in Wales. It opened to the public on 12 January 2008 and was officially opened on 26 February 2008 by Duncan Goodhew.

The building includes two pools: an Olympic size 50 m (160 ft) 10-lane competition swimming pool with seating for 1,000 spectators, and a 25 m (82 ft) 4-lane indoor waterpark with flume rides, a beach area with water slides, a lazy river and jacuzzi. The centre also has a fitness suite and studios, conference rooms and a café.

== Cardiff International White Water ==
Cardiff International White Water is a £13.3m Olympic standard canoeing and kayaking centre that opens on 27 March 2010 as part of the Sports Village. It is expected to attract 50,000 visitors a year and play a part in the London 2012 Olympics.

== Coronation Park ==
Coronation Park, adjacent to Sloper Road, Grangetown is the home of Grange Albion Football Club, who play in the South Wales Alliance League. It includes changing facilities, built in 1997.

== Guildford Crescent Swimming Baths ==
The Corporation Baths at Guildford Crescent were opened in April 1862, including a first class and a second class swimming pool. It was given over exclusively to children after the Empire Pool opened in 1958. The baths eventually closed in March 1984 and were demolished.

== Maindy Centre ==
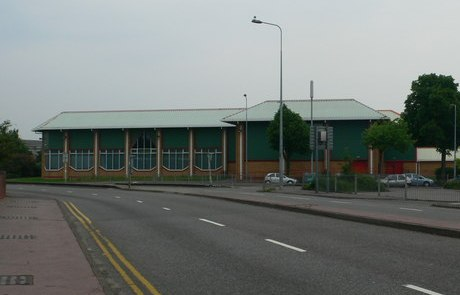
Maindy Centre

The Maindy Centre (Canolfan Maendy) comprises a full size football pitch within a floodlit 460 metres (1,510 ft) outdoor cycling velodrome, BMX pump track, fitness suite, dance studio, outdoor tarmac 5−a−side pitch and a six lane 25 metres (82 ft) swimming pool. The cycle track (previously known as Maindy Stadium) was relaid in 2006. It was one of the venues used in the 1958 British Empire and Commonwealth Games, when the site included a 400 metres (1,300 ft) six lane running track (since removed). The swimming pool opened in 1993. The Maindy Centre is home to several sports clubs, including the Maindy Flyers Youth Cycling Club, Squid Flyers Swimming Club, Maindy Corries Football Club, Maindy Higashi Karate Club, Maindy Triathlon Club, and Maindy Rookie Lifesaving Club.

== Millennium Stadium ==
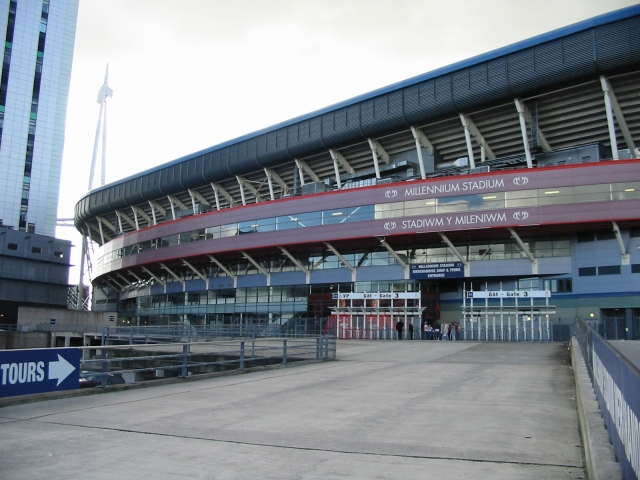
The Millennium Stadium

The city features an international sporting venue, the 74,500 capacity national Millennium Stadium (Stadiwm y Mileniwm), where Wales' national rugby and football teams play. The Millennium Stadium was built on the site of the former National Stadium, Cardiff Arms Park and was opened in 1999, in time to host the 1999 Rugby World Cup, including the final.

The Millennium Stadium also doubles up as a venue for other concerts and events such as motorsport's World Rally Championship as part of Wales Rally GB, with the first ever indoor special stages of the World Rally Championship being held at the Millennium Stadium in September 2005. It has continued to host this annual event.

One of the annual Speedway Grands Prix is staged on a purpose built full size track in the Millennium Stadium. The Grand Prix is a round of the World Speedway Championship event. Speedway was first staged at Cardiff White City greyhound stadium during the pre-war era with the first meeting being staged around Christmas 1928. In the early 1950s, a dedicated speedway stadium was constructed in Penarth Road and the Cardiff Dragons raced in the National League Division Three for a short spell.

The Millennium Stadium has been selected as one of the football venues for the London 2012 Olympics, according to the chairman of the Organising Committee, Lord Coe.

== National Indoor Athletics Centre ==
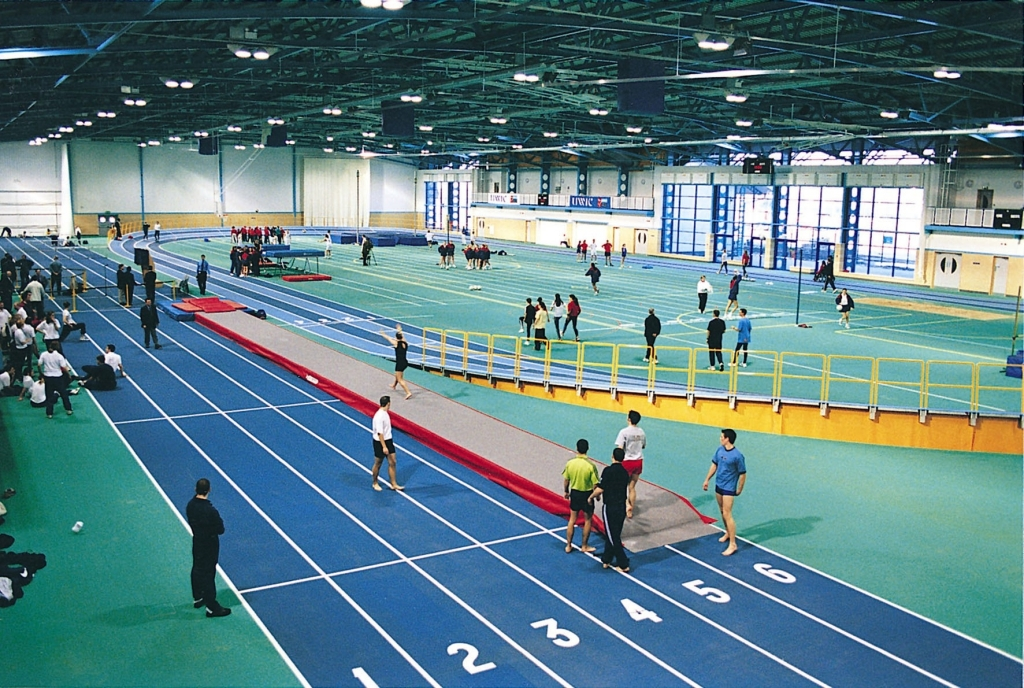
National Indoor Athletics Centre

The city's indoor track and field athletics sports venue is the National Indoor Athletics Centre, an international athletics and multi sports centre at the University of Wales Institute (UWIC) campus, Cyncoed.

The track facilities include:

- 200m, 4 lane banked track
- 60m, 8 lane straight track
- 120m, 6 lane straight track which finishes outside the main arena.

== Sophia Gardens ==
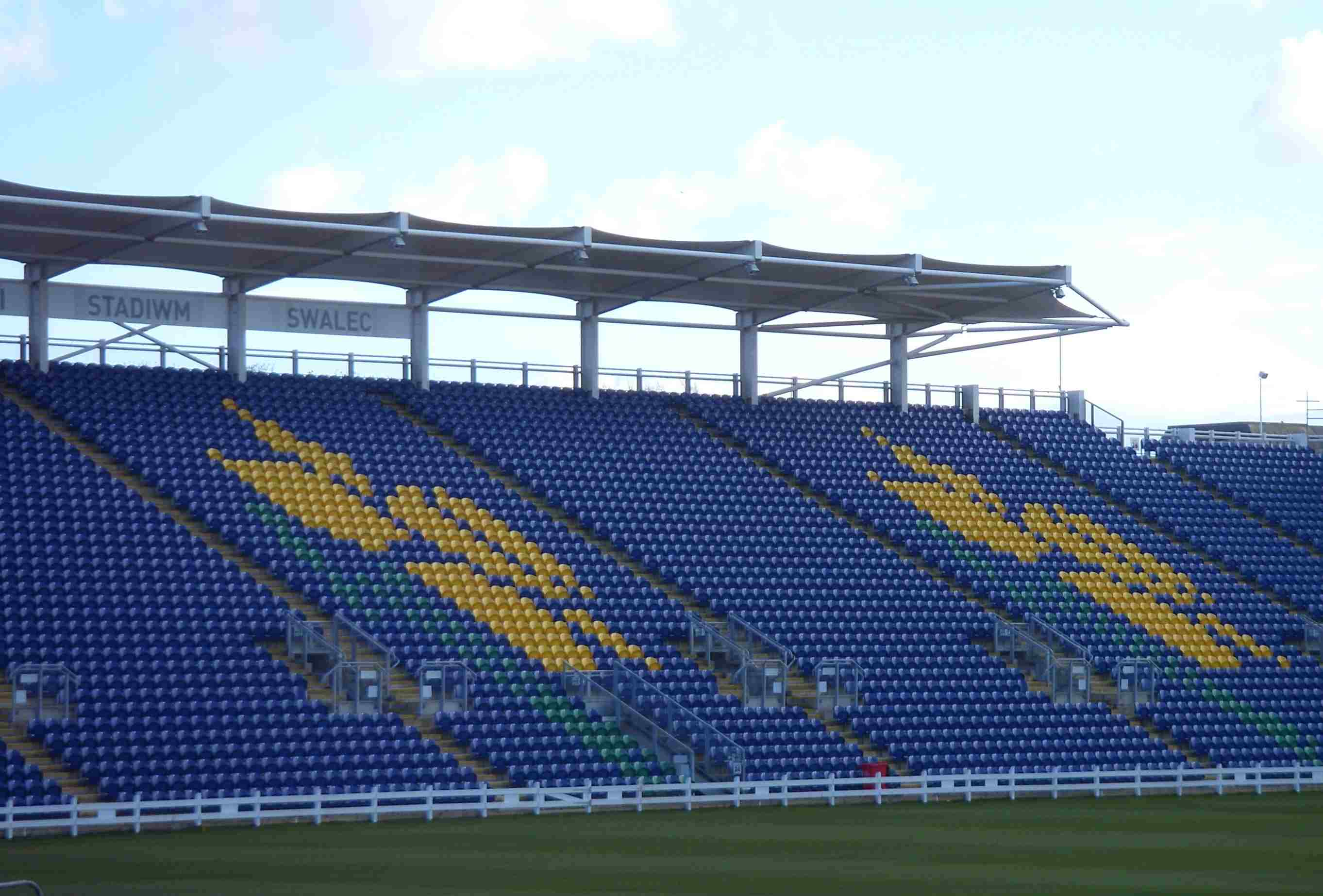
Sophia Gardens

Sophia Gardens is a 16,000 capacity, cricket stadium on the west bank of the River Taff in Cardiff, about one mile (1.6 km) north west of the Millennium Stadium. Sophia Gardens is home to the Glamorgan County Cricket Club. The cricket club has played first-class cricket matches at the venue since 1966, after moving away from Cardiff Arms Park. A 125-year lease of the ground was acquired in 1995, after the previous leaseholders, Cardiff Athletic Club, moved to their cricket section to the Diamond Ground in Whitchurch, Cardiff.

The ground was the venue for the first test match of the Ashes series between England and Australia, played from 8 to 12 July 2009.

From March 2008 to April 2018 the grounds were known as SWALEC Stadium for sponsorship reasons.

Beside the cricket ground is the large sports hall complex of the Sport Wales National Centre.

Cardiff Corinthians F.C. previously used the area for football.

== Sport Wales National Centre ==
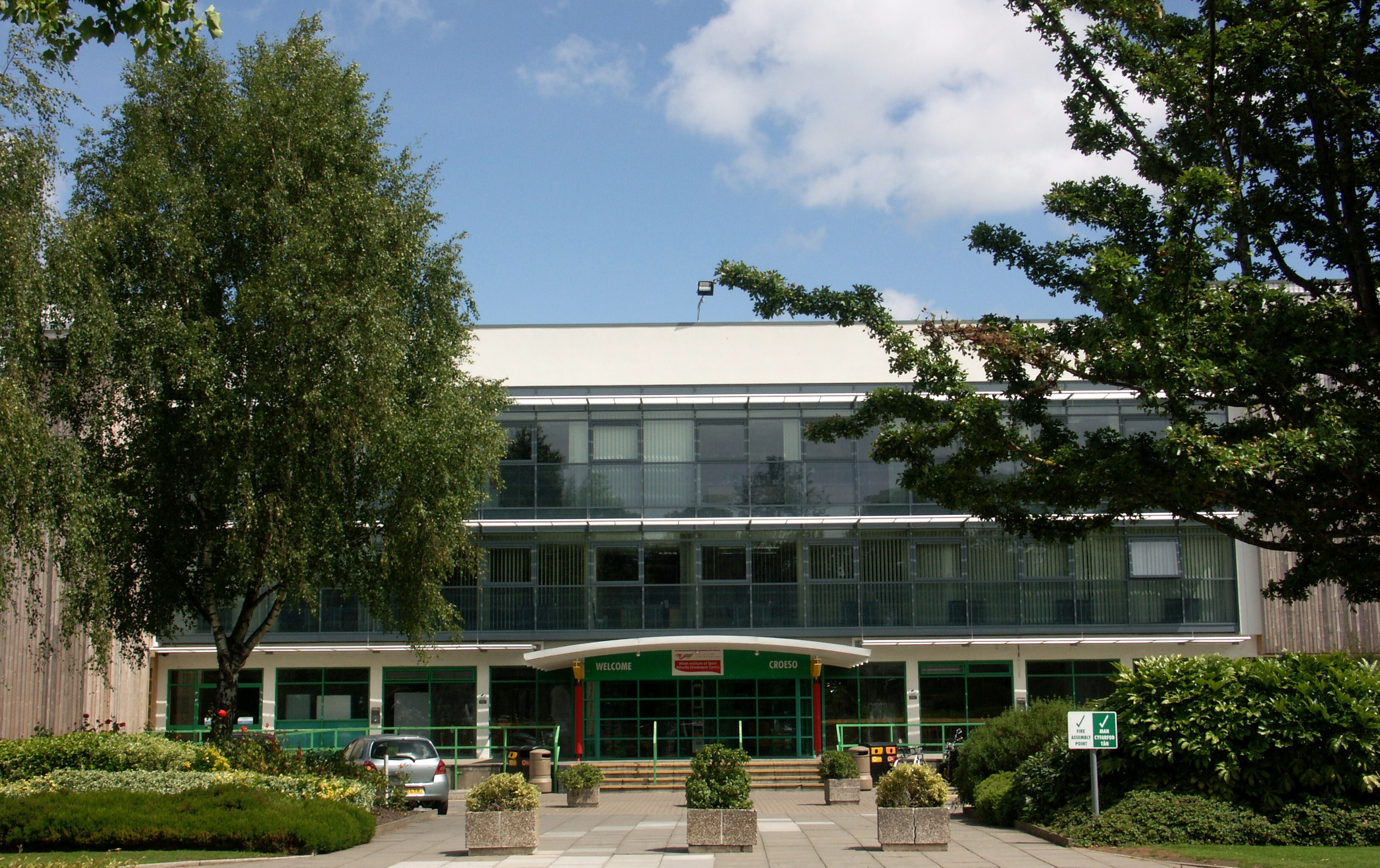
Sport Wales National Centre

The Sport Wales National Centre (Athrofa Chwaraeon Cymru) was established in 1972 to provide facilities to help develop excellence in Welsh sport. The institute has indoor sports halls, next to Glamorgan CCC's SWALEC Stadium in Sophia Gardens. Sports activities in the Main Hall include gymnastics, table tennis, trampoline, badminton, netball, basketball, archery, martial arts, fencing, dance and boxing. The site also contains squash courts and weight training rooms. Outdoors, the Institute has an international standard permeable artificial pitch, which is one of the home international venues for Welsh hockey. The pitch is also used for lacrosse and football. Their outdoor tennis courts are also used for netball and five-a-side football. Welsh national teams that train at the Sport Wales National Centre include the Welsh National Rugby team (on the institute's full-size, floodlit rugby pitch), Welsh National Badminton team, the Women's Welsh National Netball Team and the Welsh National Gymnastic Team.

== Wales Empire Pool ==
The Empire Pool was an international standard swimming pool building, constructed in the city centre for the 1958 British Empire and Commonwealth Games (hosted by Cardiff). It was demolished in 1998 to make way for construction work on the new Millennium Stadium.

== See also ==
- List of places in Cardiff
- Sport in Cardiff
