= Leisure centres in Cardiff =

Most leisure centres in Cardiff, capital of Wales, are owned by Cardiff Council. Since 2016, the running of eight formerly Council-run leisure centres has been outsourced to Greenwich Leisure Limited, operating under their 'Better' branding. Channel View Leisure Centre continues to be managed by Cardiff Council, whilst the Cardiff International Pool in Cardiff Bay is run separately by another private company.

== Leisure centres ==
=== Channel View Centre ===
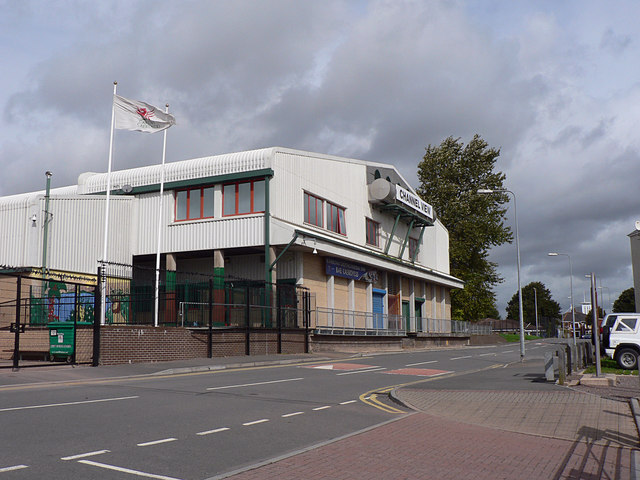
Channel View Centre

Channel View Centre (Welsh: Canolfan Channel View) reopened on 1 March 2002 after a period of closure from 1997, in Grangetown in the south of the city.

Its facilities include a sports hall with 3G Astroturf pitch, outdoor five-a-side 3G Astroturf pitch, fitness suite, dance studio, music room, activities area, climbing wall, squash court and a World Trail (outdoor exercise equipment which has the following stations: Step Up, Push Up, Beam Jump, Climbing Wall, Body Curl, Leg Lift, Vault bar and Horizontal Loop Ladder.). Activities include junior activities, children's parties, holiday programmes and fitness classes including aerobics, circuits, boxercise and cardio and kickboxing.

The centre is also host to Cardiff Bay Water Activity Centre which offers a wide range of water and land based activities.

The centre is served by Cardiff Bus service 9A and Grangetown railway station.

=== Eastern Leisure Centre ===
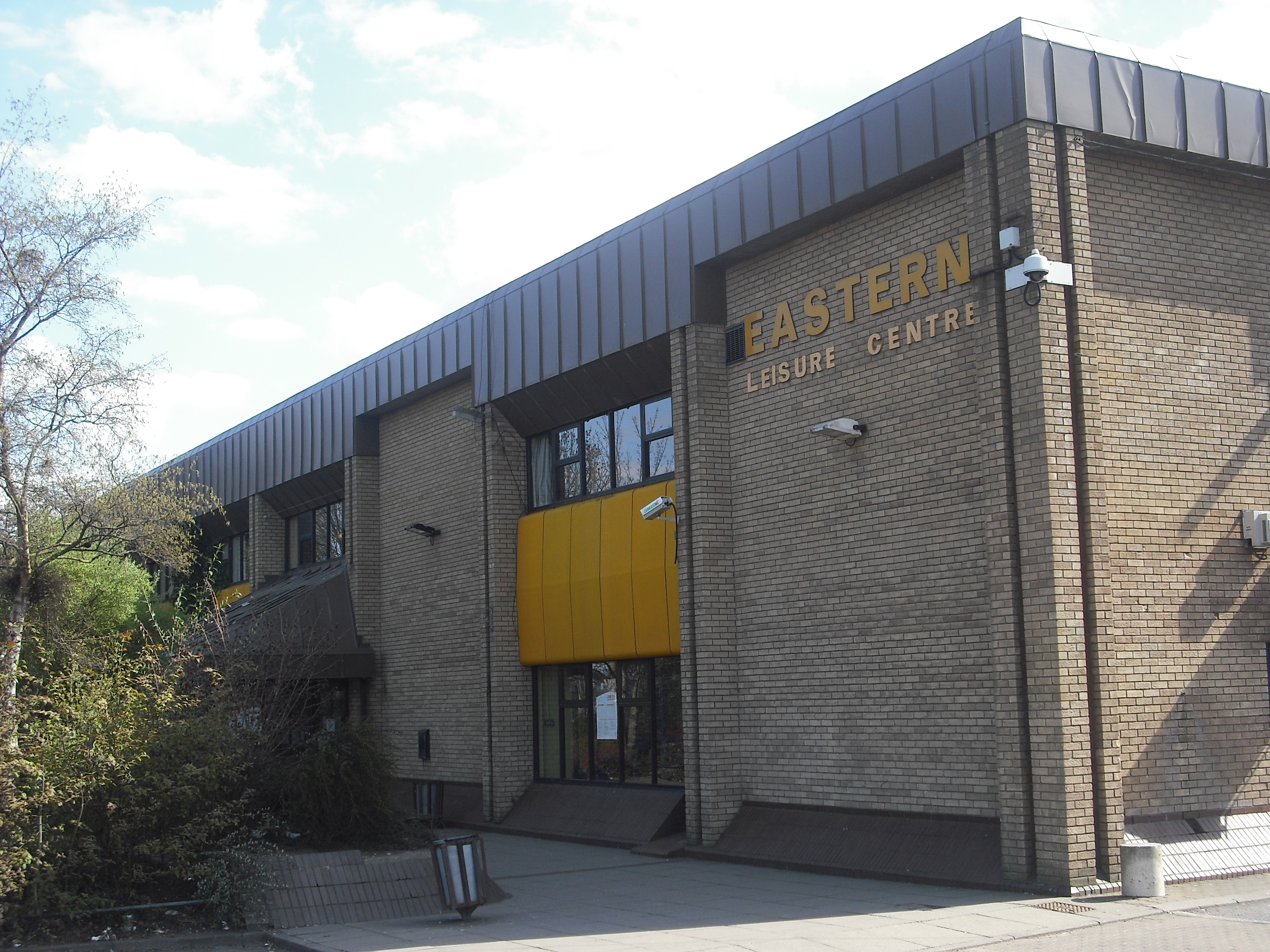
Eastern Leisure Centre

Eastern Leisure Centre (Welsh: Canolfan Hamdden y Dwyrain) opened in 1982 in Llanrumney, serving south eastern areas of the city. Facilities include a 25m x 12m swimming pool, 6 badminton courts, multi use sports hall, 5 squash courts, fitness suite, outdoor tarmac 5-a-side pitch, activity area, community suite, crèche, junior activities, children's parties, holiday programmes, trampolining and gymnastics, cafeteria and vending machines, and a lounge bar.

Cardiff Council is planning to develop the site of the leisure centre to include a new secondary school for the area.

The centre is served by Cardiff Bus services 49 and 50.

Eastern Leisure Centre is currently closed for refurbishment. It is anticipated to reopen in Autumn 2016.

=== Fairwater Leisure Centre ===
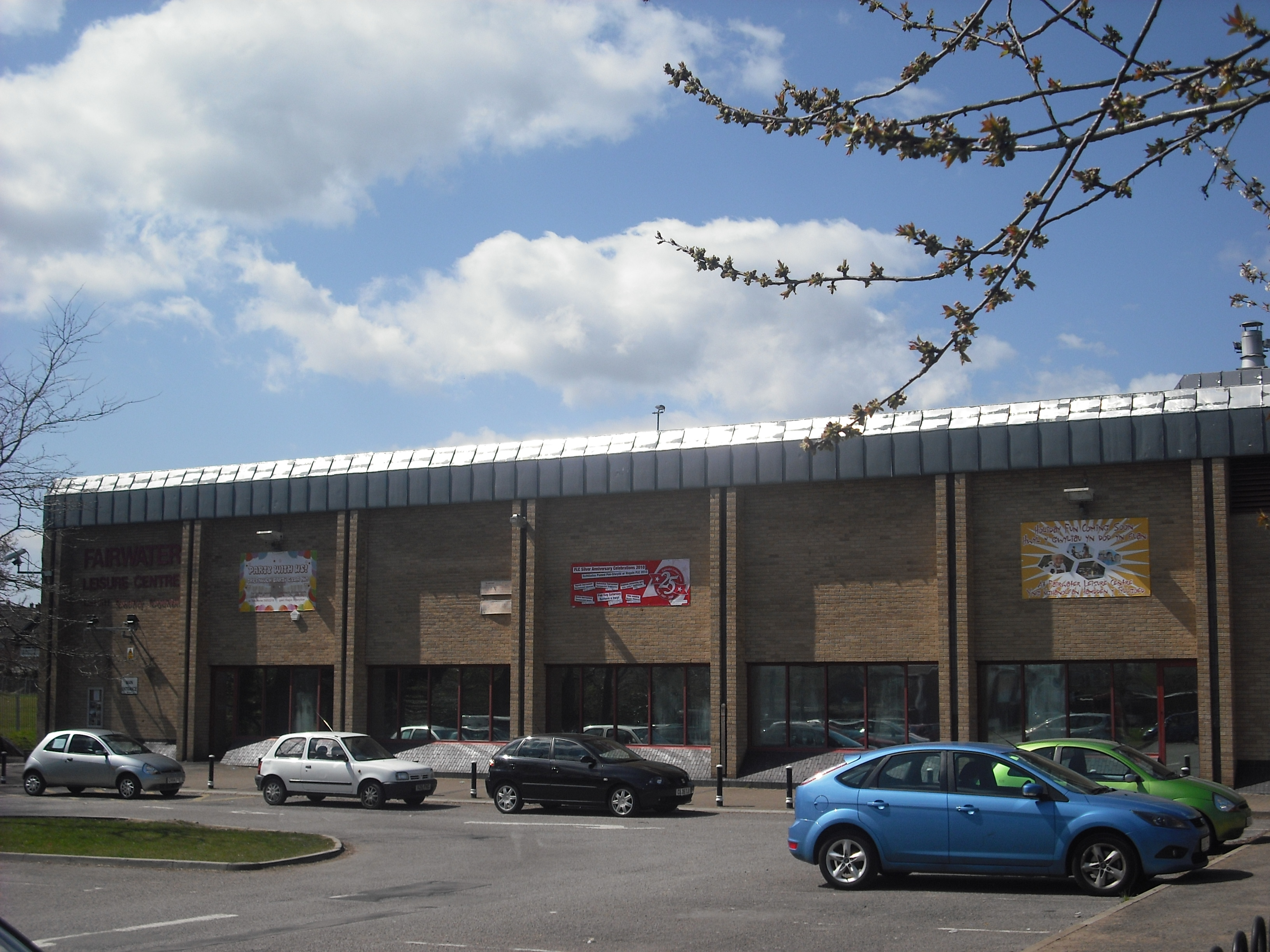
Fairwater Leisure Centre

Fairwater Leisure Centre (Welsh: Canolfan Hamdden y Tyllgoed) opened in 1983 in Fairwater, serving the north west of the city. Its facilities include 4 badminton courts, sports hall, 4 squash courts, outdoor skate park, fitness suite, 25m x 12.5m swimming pool, children's activities, junior activities including gymnastics, trampolining and football, holiday programme, cafteria, vending machines, and a lounge bar.

In 2008, a local version of Britain's Got Talent was held at the centre. In February 2010, the leisure centre was targeted by thieves who broke into lockers.

The centre is served by Cardiff Bus services 33 and 61 and Danescourt railway station.

=== Llanishen Leisure Centre ===
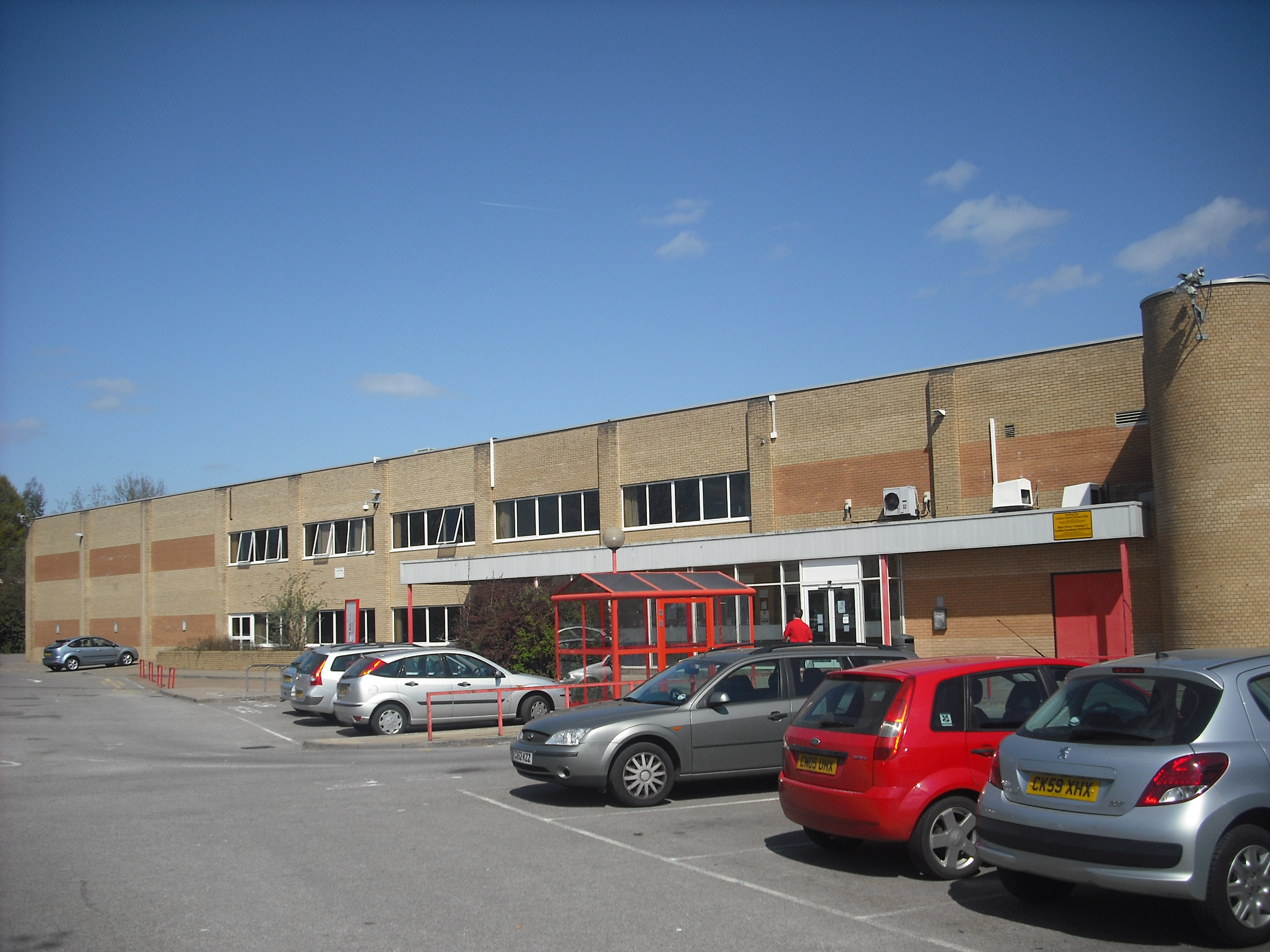
Llanishen Leisure Centre

Llanishen Leisure Centre (Welsh: Canolfan Hamdden Llanisien) is the largest in Cardiff, in Llanishen in the north of the city. The centre opened in 1987 and has facilities including a leisure pool with wave machine, 6 badminton courts, multi use sports hall, 3 squash courts, fitness suite with cardio theatre music system, mini gym with fitness assessment room, community suite, crèche, junior activities, children's parties, holiday programmes, bar/coffee area, pool side café, snooker room, and a private function room with catering and licensed bar for 250 people.

In 2006, Llanishen Leisure Centre installed a pool cover and controls for its pool pumps heating and cooling, resulting in a 20% drop in CO_{2} emissions since 2006 and energy savings of more than £30,000 were made in 2008–09.

The leisure centre is served by Cardiff Bus services 29, 29B and 52A and Ty Glas railway station.

=== Maindy Centre ===
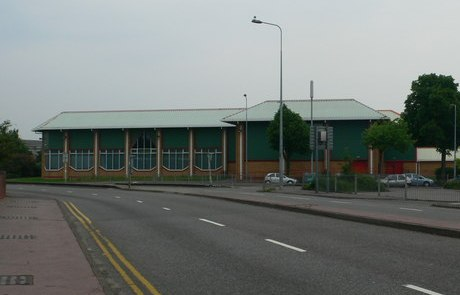
Maindy Pool

Maindy Centre (Welsh: Canolfan Maendy), also known as Maindy Swimming Pool and Cycle Track, was originally opened in 1993 in Maindy. In June 2005 a new 56 station fitness Suite, dance studio and lecture room were opened. Its facilities also include a 25m deck level swimming pool (6 lanes), football pitch (full size), floodlit 460m outdoor velodrome, outdoor tarmac 5-a-side pitch, and a cafeteria. The Life Trail (outdoor exercise equipment) has the following stations: Welcome station, Lower Body Warm-Up, Upper Body Warm Up, Torso Stability, Standing Push Up, Forearm Roll and Lower Body Stretch.

The site also incorporates the Road Safety Centre which provides various road safety programmes, school crossing patrol training, mature driver refresher courses, driving simulators and external traffic features.

Maindy Centre is home to the Maindy Flyers Youth Cycling Club, Maindy Marlins Swimming Club, Maindy Corries Football Club, Maindy Higashi Karate Club, Maindy Triathlon Club and Maindy Rookie Lifesaving Club.

The cycle track was used in the 1958 British Empire and Commonwealth Games held in Cardiff.

The leisure centre is served by Cardiff Bus services 21, 23, 24, 25 and 27.

=== Pentwyn Leisure Centre ===
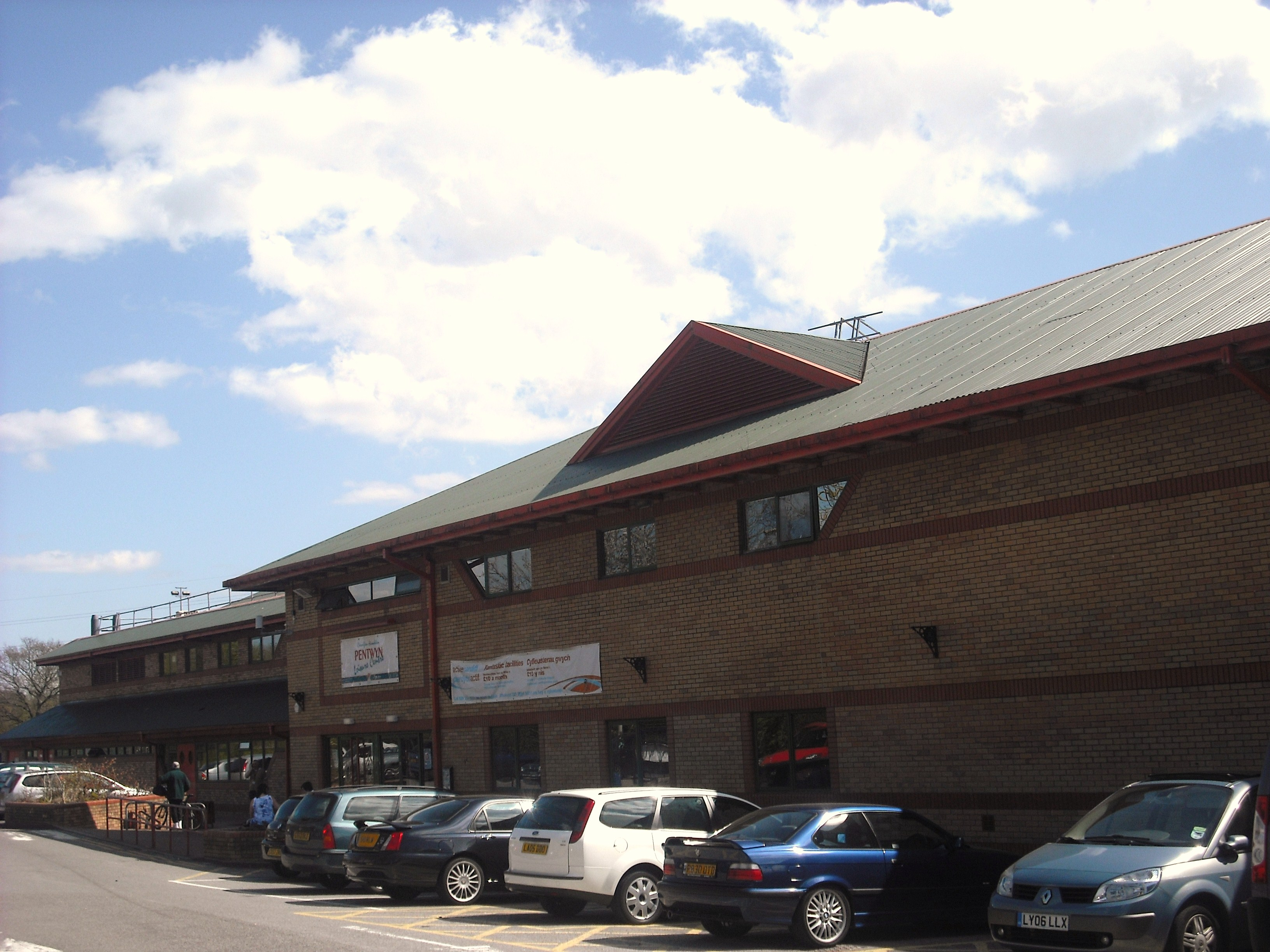
Pentwyn Leisure Centre

Pentwyn Leisure Centre (Welsh: Canolfan Hamdden Pentwyn) opened in 1989 in Pentwyn in the north east of the city. Its facilities include a leisure pool with slide, waves and features, 4 badminton courts, multi use sports hall, 2 squash courts, fitness suite, community suite, an upper activity area, crèche, junior activities, children's parties, holiday programmes, bar/coffee area, poolside café, and suites available for private function hire with catering and licensed bar.

In November 2009, the Welsh Open Dodgeball Tournament was held at Pentwyn Leisure Centre. The centre's swimming pool was dyed pink in celebration of a fundraising community day in 2009.

The leisure centre is served by Cardiff Bus services 51 and 58.

=== STAR Centre ===
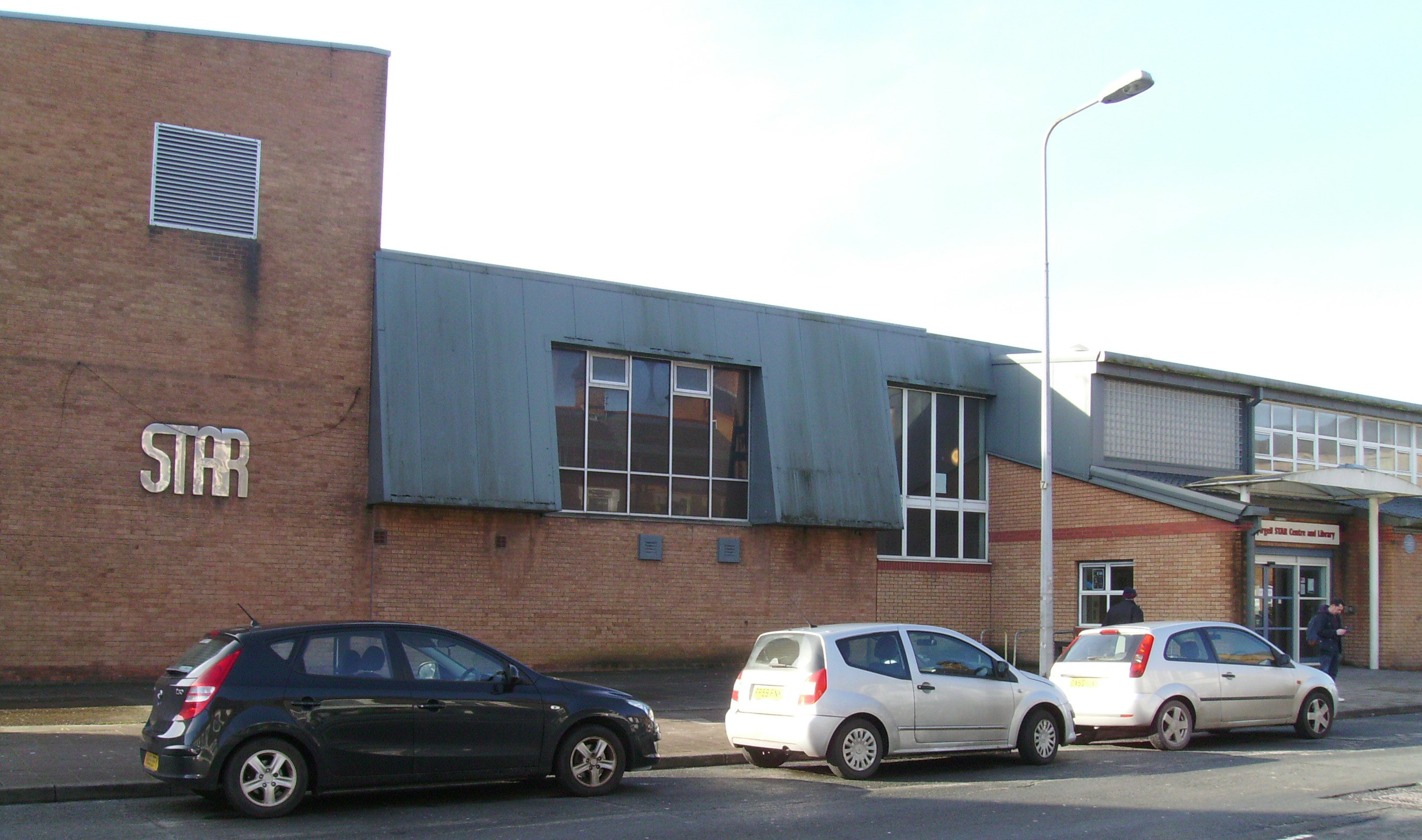
The STAR Centre

STAR Centre (Welsh: Canolfan STAR), in Splott first opened in 1981 and was taken over by the Council in 2001 undergoing refurbishment to include a fitness suite, a disabled lift in the foyer and the incorporation of the new Splott Library.

Its facilities include six badminton courts, facilities for basketball/netball/football, disabled facilities and changing room, fitness suite, gymnastics, soft play, meeting rooms, function room, children's activities, holiday programmes, vending machines, and a fully licensed bar.

Cardiff's Dragon Dolls roller derby team train weekly at the Star centre, where the Cardiff Beer Festival, Wales' biggest beer festival, has previously been held.

The leisure centre is served by Cardiff Bus service 11. This venue has now closed and been turned into a medical centre.

=== Western Leisure Centre ===
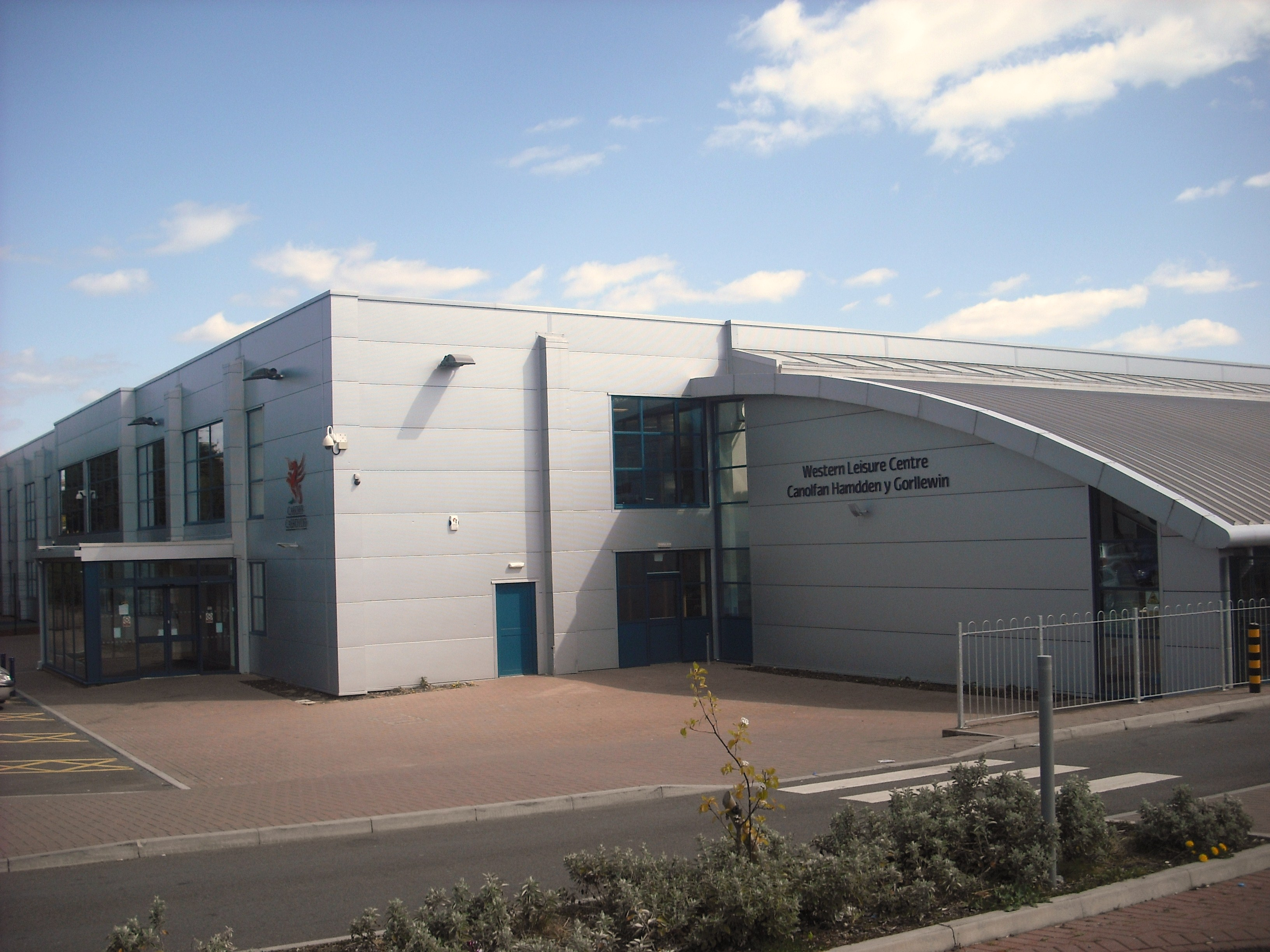
Western Leisure Centre

Western Leisure Centre (Welsh: Canolfan Hamdden y Gorllewin) opened in 1979 in Caerau, serving the south west of the city. The centre was rebuilt in 2008 at a cost of £5.5m and could be used for training for the 2012 Olympic Games

Its facilities include a 72 station gymnasium/fitness suite, cardio theatre, spinning room, dance studio, training/meeting room, community room (crèche, martial arts, children's parties, holiday programmes), outdoor floodlit multi use games area (for football, basketball and tennis), deck level swimming pool (25 metres x 12.5 metres), teaching swimming pool (13 metres x 7 metres), small beached toddler pool with small slide and snake water squirter, vending machines and café. Western Leisure Centre is home to Western Warriors Swimming Club.

In February 2010, the leisure centre was targeted by thieves who broke into lockers.

The leisure centre is served by Cardiff Bus services 12, 13 and 96.

== Other facilities ==
=== Cardiff International Pool ===
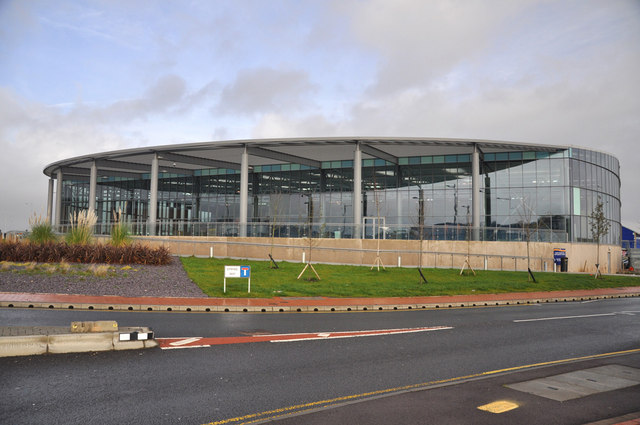
Cardiff International Pool

Cardiff International Pool (Welsh: Pwll Rhyngwladol Caerdydd), in the Cardiff International Sports Village, opened on 12 January 2008. It is a public-private funded project, with a partnership between Cardiff Council (land owner) and Parkwood Leisure (operator).

Construction of the £32 million facility commenced in April 2006 and includes two pools; an Olympic standard 50 m (160 ft) 10-lane competition swimming pool with seating for 1,000 spectators and a 25 m (82 ft) 4-lane indoor waterpark with flume rides, a beach area with water slides, a lazy river and Jacuzzi. The centre also has a fitness suite and studios, conference rooms and a café.

It was also built to support the London 2012 Olympics as a training facility. The pool replaces the Olympic size Empire Pool (used in the 1958 British Empire and Commonwealth Games, which Cardiff hosted) which was demolished to make way for the Millennium Stadium ready for Cardiff and Wales to host the 1999 Rugby World Cup.

The leisure centre is served by Cardiff Bus services 9 and 305 and by Cogan railway station.

=== Cardiff International Sports Stadium ===
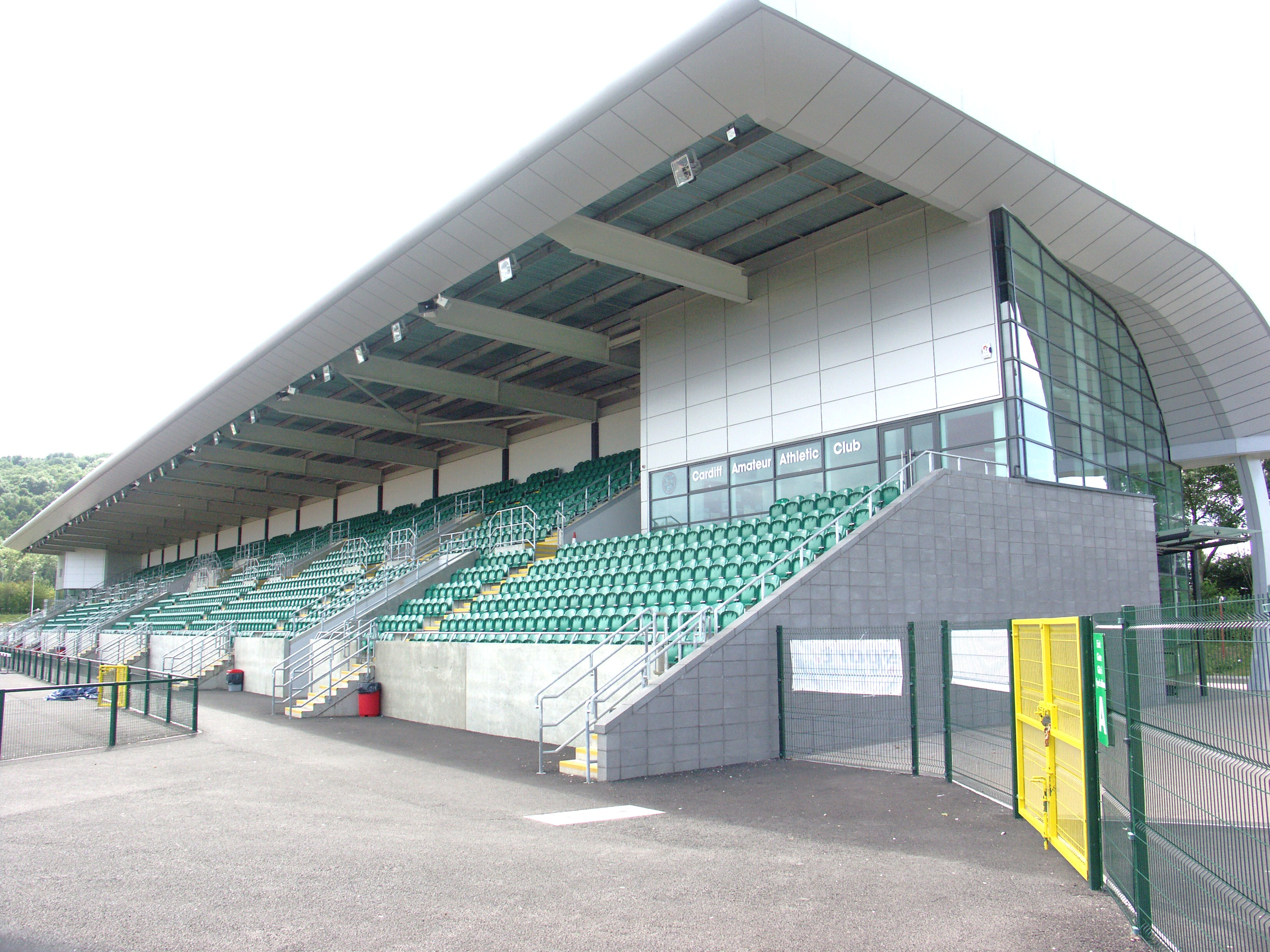
Cardiff International Sports Stadium

Cardiff International Sports Stadium (Welsh: Stadiwm Chawaraeon Rhyngwladol Caerdydd) is a multi sport and special event facility. It has a capacity of 4,953.

Its facilities include a fully certificated international track and field facilities including an international standard external throws area, photo finish rooms and equipment, announcer's room, doping control facilities, first aid room, sports retail outlet, 50 station staffed fitness suite including a cardio theatre, hospitality suite, 2 activity zones, 2 training rooms, physiotherapist rooms, 7 changing rooms, 100m x 70m inner field, full size artificial training pitch, 2 rugby / football pitches (1 floodlit), Trim trail leading to extensive off-road running with links to Cardiff's parks and the Taff Trail, and wetlands areas within facility grounds.

The stadium also is the home of Welsh athletics, Cardiff City Youth Team, Cardiff Bay Harlequins A.F.C., Cardiff City Ladies football club and Cardiff Amateur Athletic Club.

The stadium is served by Cardiff Bus service 95 and Ninian Park railway station. There are 180 parking spaces on site and 1,000 spaces adjacent to the stadium.
