= Wales National Pool =

Swimming pool in Swansea, Wales

Coordinates: 51°36′27.00″N 3°59′20.00″W

Logo of the Wales National Pool

The Wales National Pool (Welsh: Pwll Cenedlaethol Cymru) is a 50-metre swimming pool in the Sketty area of Swansea, Wales.

The main pool is 50 metres (160 ft) long and 21 metres (69 ft) wide, which does not meet the World Aquatics definition of an Olympic size pool.

== History ==
The £11 million pool opened in 2003 following the demolition of Wales' national pool, the Wales Empire Pool in Cardiff, in 1998 due to the construction of the Millennium Stadium, and served as its replacement for a short period, until the construction of the £32 million Cardiff International Pool.

== Use ==
The facility, which also has a 25m x 9.5m training pool and 1,200 spectator seats, is one of the facilities used to train Wales' world class aquatic sports athletes and houses the headquarters of the Swim Wales, formerly the Wales Amateur Swimming Association.

Some swimmers used the pool to train for the London 2012 Olympics. The facility was built with funding from Sport Wales, Swansea Council and Swansea University and is built on the site of the university's sports centre.

== See also ==
- List of Olympic-size swimming pools in the United Kingdom
