= Corby East Midlands International Pool =

Sports facility in Northamptonshire, England

Corby East Midlands International Swimming Pool
- Interactive map of Corby East Midlands International Swimming Pool
- Location: George Street, Corby, NN17 1QG
- Coordinates: 52.487989°N 0.705701°W
- Operator: North Northamptonshire Council
- Dimensions: Length: 50 metres (164 ft); Width: 20 metres (66 ft); Depth: 4 metres (13 ft)

Construction
- Opened: July 2009
- Construction cost: £19 million

Website
- Website

Corby East Midland International Swimming Pool (also known as Corby Pool) is a sports facility located in Corby, Northamptonshire, England, which is owned and run by North Northamptonshire Council. The centre, which cost £19 million, was opened in July 2009 and is regularly used by the Northants ASA to host competitive swimming galas and their annual championships. The pool is used by Corby Swimming Club and Corby Steel Diving Club as their main training facility. It is also used by Northampton Swimming Club for training and for hosting open meets.

== Facilities ==
=== Pools ===
The main pool is a long course 50m pool with eight lanes. The pool has adjustable floors at both ends of the pool meaning that the pool can be split into three sections. There are also diving blocks and 'touch pads' in all lanes at both ends of the pool allowing for competition to take place. At the west side of the pool there is diving equipment including a 5m fixed platform and four spring boards. The floor at this end can go down to a maximum of four metres for safety reasons.

South west of the main pool is a four lane twenty metre pool. This is often used for lessons and as a warm down pool at competitions.

East of the main pool is a fun pool with a pirate ship theme. The pool is of varying depths and includes a large 'water flume'.

=== Gym ===
The pool also features a 70 station gym, which looks over the pool, as well as a studio.

== See also ==
- List of long course swimming pools in the United Kingdom
