= Swim Wales =

Governing body of swimming in Wales

- Nofio Cymru
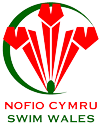
- Abbreviation: WASA
- Formation: 1897
- Type: National governing body
- Headquarters: Wales National Pool, Sketty, Swansea
- Region served: Wales
- Members: 9,800+ members; 90+ clubs
- CEO: Fergus Feeney
- Chair: Ian Jones
- Affiliations: Aquatics GB, Sport Wales
- Website: www.swimwales.org
- Remarks: Formerly known as the Welsh Amateur Swimming Association.

Swim Wales (Welsh: Nofio Cymru) (WASA) (founded 1897 as the Welsh Amateur Swimming Association) is the national governing body of diving, swimming (including open water and synchronised swimming) and water polo, in Wales. It is responsible for establishing the laws of the sport, for organising certification and education programmes for coaches, officials and teachers, and for recreational swimming, aiming to ensure that everybody in Wales has the opportunity to learn to swim.

Swim Wales is structured regionally—with over 90 member clubs and a combined membership of over 9,800 members in the South East Wales, West Wales and North Wales regions—supporting their affiliated swimming, diving, water polo, masters and disabled clubs. It manages the development of competitive swimming sports from starter to international level, and organises competitions, including closed, national and open championships.

Swim Wales is based at the Wales National Pool, Sketty, Swansea.
