= Stonehaven Open Air Pool =

Outdoor swimming pool in Aberdeenshire, Scotland

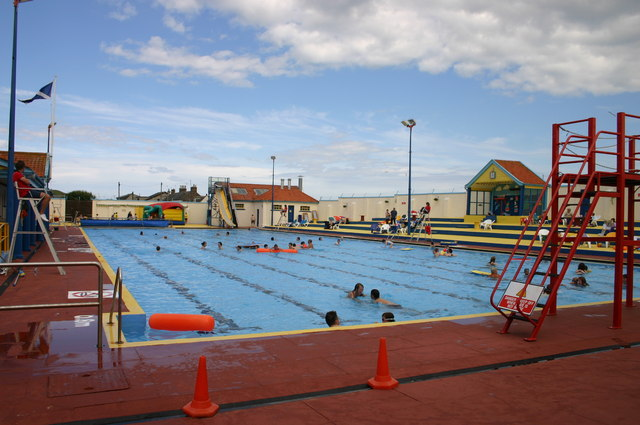
- Stonehaven Open Air Pool in 2005
- Interactive map of Stonehaven Open Air Pool
- Coordinates: 56.969691°N 2.204508°W
- Owner: Aberdeenshire Council
- Type: Open air salt water
- Dimensions: Length: 50 metres (164 ft); Width: 18 metres (59 ft)

Construction
- Opened: 4 June 1934

Website
- https://stonehavenopenairpool.co.uk/

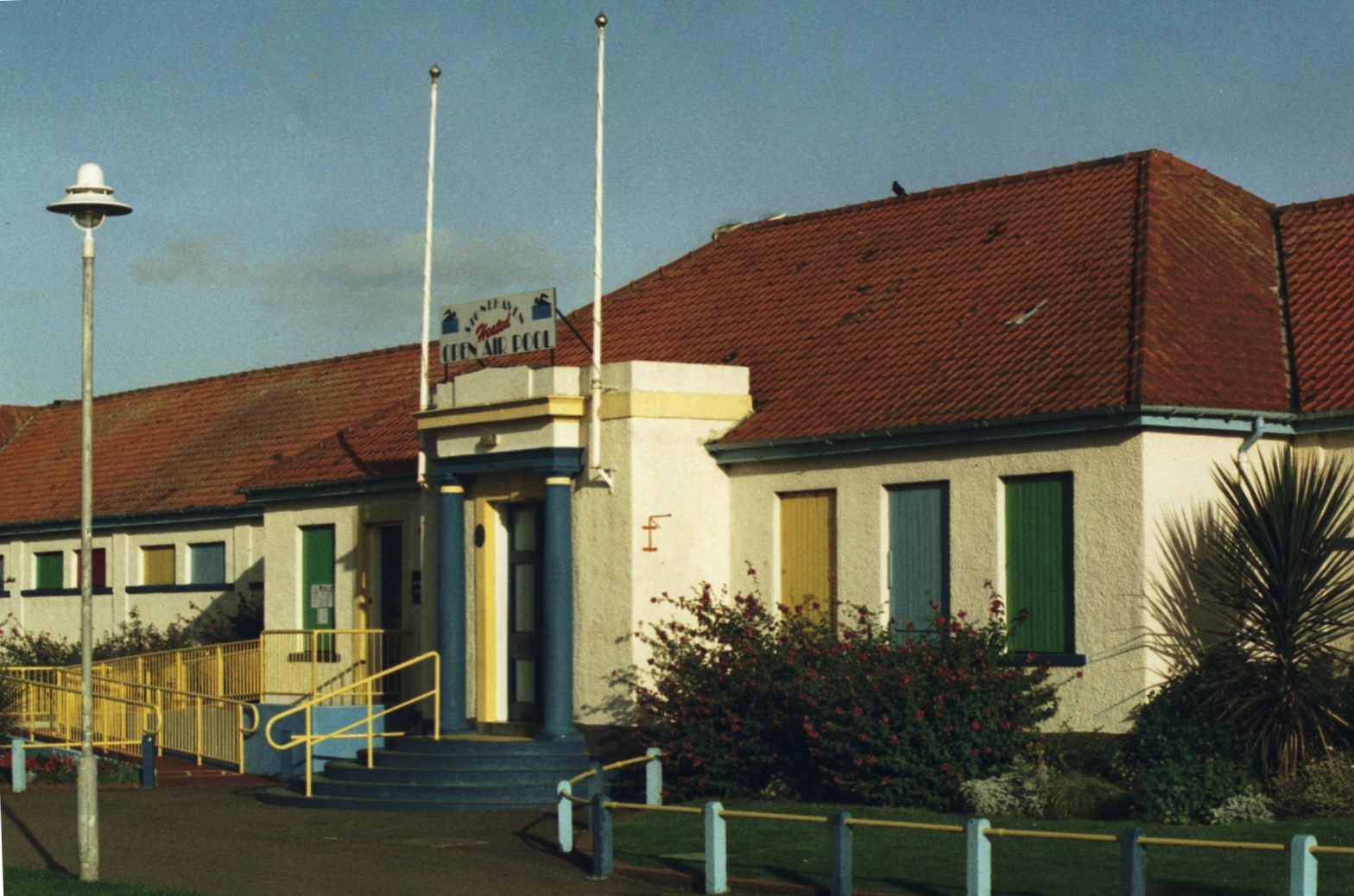
Entrance to the pool

Stonehaven Open Air Swimming Pool, Queen Elizabeth Park, Stonehaven, Aberdeenshire, is an Olympic sized heated open air public pool opened on 4 June 1934. It is one of the northernmost lidos in the UK. The pool is operated by Live Life Aberdeenshire.

== Description ==
This 55 yard (50.3 meters) x 20 yard open air pool is the UK's only art deco Olympic sized sea water lido. The water is heated (29C/84F) and the pool is open from late May to early September. There is a Leisure Centre with indoor swimming pool next door. Other facilities include a paddling pool and a cafe.

At the deep end, there is a small water slide, themed as a shark. An inflatable swoopee is also available on weekend afternoons in early & late season and daily in high season (local school holidays). Midnight swims are also offered weekly in high season. There was also previously a high diving board, but this was removed in the 1980's.

== History ==
The pool was opened 4 June 1934 by MP Malcolm Barclay-Harvey with a ceremony that included speed swimming and diving. Initially unheated, a combined heating and filtration system was installed for 1935 following complaints that the pool was too cold.

The pool remained open during World War II. It was used by locally based soldiers for recreation.

Usage of the pool declined in the 1970s, reportedly due to changing holiday patterns.

The Friends of the Pool organisation was created in 1995 following a threat of closure from the council. On 5 March 1996, councillors decided to mothball the pool in an attempt to save around £80,000 in yearly subsidies. Following a local campaign led by the Friends of the Pool, the council announced that it would not withdraw the funds, allowing the pool to continue to operate. While the Council owns and operates the pool, the Friends maintain, enhance and promote the pool.

In 2019, the slide was closed due to concerns about the state of its supporting structure. It was replaced for the opening of the pool in 2021.

The pool did not operate in 2020 due to the COVID-19 pandemic. It reopened in 2021. In 2025, winter "cold water swimming" sessions were introduced from the 8th of November.
