= List of long-course swimming pools in the United Kingdom =

This is an annotated list of swimming pools in the United Kingdom which conform to the Olympic standard. Additionally, it lists other long-course facilities that do not quite come up to the full standard of 50 × 25 metres, 10 (middle 8 used) lanes.

At the start of the 21st century, the provision of 50-metre swimming pools in the United Kingdom was very poor for a developed country. Few universities possessed 50-metre pools, and there was a marked reluctance on the part of municipal authorities to build new public long-course facilities. However, the successful bid to hold the 2012 Summer Olympics in London added impetus to the development of new pools. A number of new venues were completed before and after the Games, although some existing pools were demolished and not replaced by 50-metre facilities.

As of 2022, no university in the UK possesses an Olympic standard pool, though several have an 8-lane 50-metre pool. The Aberdeen Aquatics Centre, being part funded by the University of Aberdeen, is the main pool facility for the university.

== Olympic size pools ==
Location	Pool/centre name	Pool dimensions		Opened	Further information
Location	Pool/centre name	Length	Width (lanes)	Opened	Further information
Aberdeen	Aberdeen Aquatics Centre	50 m	25 m (10)	2014	Opened 5 May 2014 as part of the Aberdeen Sports Village complex.
Bangor, County Down	Bangor Aurora Aquatic and Leisure Complex	50 m	25 m (10)	2013	Plus a 7 lane (15m?) x 25m diving pool at the end of the main pool.
Bristol	Hengrove Park Leisure Centre	50 m	25 m (10)	2012	Opened 29 February 2012.
Cardiff	Cardiff International Pool	50 m	25 m (10)	2008	Part of the Cardiff International Sports Village. Opened 12 January 2008.
Derby	Moorways Sports Village	50 m	25 m (10)	2022	
Glasgow	Tollcross International Swimming Centre	50 m	25 m (10)	1997, 2013	The pool was reopened on 24 May 2013 after refurbishment. Second 50 m pool was added for the 2014 Commonwealth Games.
Glasgow	Tollcross International Swimming Centre	50 m	15 m (6)	1997, 2013	The pool was reopened on 24 May 2013 after refurbishment. Second 50 m pool was added for the 2014 Commonwealth Games.
Leeds	John Charles Centre for Sport	50 m	25 m (10)	2007	Formerly South Leeds Stadium.
London	London Aquatics Centre	50 m	25 m (10)	2011	Venue for the 2012 Summer Olympics. Includes 25 x 25 m diving pool adjacent to main competition pool.
London	London Aquatics Centre	50 m	20 m (8)	2011	Venue for the 2012 Summer Olympics. Includes 25 x 25 m diving pool adjacent to main competition pool.
Plymouth	Plymouth Life Centre	50 m	25 m (10)	2012	Part of the new £46.5m Life Centre. Opened in March 2012.
Sandwell	Sandwell Aquatics Centre	50 m	25 m (10)	2022	Venue for the 2022 Commonwealth Games in Birmingham, at Londonderry Playing Fields, Smethwick.
Sheffield	Ponds Forge International Sports Centre	50 m	25 m (10)	1991	Used for a large number of English and British National events
Sunderland	Sunderland Aquatic Centre	50 m	25 m (10)	2008	Opened 18 April 2008.

=== Planned or under construction ===
Location	Pool/centre name	Pool dimensions		Further information
Location	Pool/centre name	Length	Width (lanes)	Further information
Cambridge	Cambridge Sports Centre	50 m	25 m (10)	Planned for Phase 3 of the new sports centre (currently at Phase 1) for the University of Cambridge on the West Cambridge Site.

== Other 50 metre pools ==
Location	Pool/centre name	Pool dimensions		Further information
Location	Pool/centre name	Length	Width (lanes)	Further information
Aldershot	Aldershot Garrison Sports Centre	50 m	18 m (8)	This is a British Army swimming pool, but it is open to the public at certain times.
Banbury	Woodgreen Leisure Centre	50 m	(8)	Heated open air pool.
Basildon	Basildon Sporting Village	50 m	(8)	Constructed by Basildon District Council in time to support the 2012 London Olympics. Plans for refurbishment finalised for April 2025 to September 2025 due to failure of equipment.
Bath	University of Bath Sports Training Village	50 m	(8)	
Birmingham	University of Birmingham Sports Centre	50 m	17 m	As part of new University Sports Centre.
Brighton and Hove	Sea Lanes Brighton	50 m		
Cheltenham	Sandford Parks Lido	50 m	27 m (10)	Heated open-air pool, open seasonally between March and October.
Corby, Northamptonshire	Corby East Midlands International Swimming Pool	50 m	(8)	Opened July 2009.
Coventry	The Alan Higgs Centre	50 m	(8)	Built to replace the previous 50 m pool at Coventry Sports and Leisure Centre, which was closed in February 2020
Crawley	K2 Crawley	50 m	(8)	
London Borough of Barking and Dagenham	Becontree Heath Leisure Centre	50 m	(4)	Built in addition to current 10-lane 25 m pool, which opened late 2018. The 50 m pool is now open for public swimming on weekday mornings and at weekends.
Dundee	Olympia	50 m	(6)	
East Kilbride	The Dollan Aqua Centre	50 m	(6)	Reopened in May 2011 after refurbishment.
Edinburgh	Royal Commonwealth Pool	50 m	21 m (8)	Built for the 1970 British Commonwealth Games. Refurbished 2012.
Guildford	Guildford Lido	50 m	27.4 m (10)	An outdoor pool that is open during the summer months only.
Guildford	Surrey Sports Park	50 m	20 m (8)	Part of the University of Surrey.
High Wycombe	Wycombe Leisure Centre	50 m	(8)	Opened January 2016 replacing Wycombe Sports Centre. 8-lane 50 m competition pool with 4-lane 20 m community pool.
Hillingdon	Hillingdon Sports & Leisure Centre	50 m	20 m (8)	The new indoor pool adjacent to a refurbished Uxbridge Lido, opened on 23 March 2010.
Hitchin	Hitchin Swimming Centre	50 m		Hitchin Swimming Centre sports indoor and outdoor pools. Outdoor pool opens between May and September.
Letchworth	Letchworth Outdoor Pool	50 m		Open between May and September.
Liverpool	Liverpool Aquatics Centre	50 m	(8)	
London Borough of Ealing	Gurnell Leisure Centre	50 m	(8)	The centre has been permanently closed.
London	Brockwell Lido	50 m		
London	Charlton Lido	50 m	(4)	Lido, re-opened in 2013; closed from November 2013 until April 2014 for refurbishment.
London	Crystal Palace National Sports Centre	50 m	(8)	The Olympic pool has been closed for a while. The 25 m training pool in the basement is available.
London	London Fields Lido	50 m	17 m (8)	Lido, opened in 1932, closed in 1988, and re-opened in 2006.
London	Park Road Lido	50 m	23 m	Lido, opened in 1929, significant restoration and redevelopment in 2014/15.
Loughborough	English Institute of Sport	50 m	20 m (8)	Based at Loughborough University.
Luton	Inspire: Luton Sports Village	50 m	(8)	A 50 m, eight-lane pool, a diving training centre and a 20 m × 10 m community pool.
Manchester	Manchester Aquatics Centre	50 m	20 m (8)	Built for the 2002 Commonwealth Games.
Manchester	Manchester Aquatics Centre	50 m	8 m (4)	Built for the 2002 Commonwealth Games.
Norwich	Sportspark	50 m	17 m (8)	Part of the University of East Anglia.
Nottingham	Harvey Hadden Sports Village	50 m	21 m (8)	Completed in Summer 2015.
Oundle	Oundle School Sports Centre	50 m	(6)	
Peterborough	Peterborough Lido	50 m	18.5 m (8)	Open-air heated lido. Open from end of May to September.
Portsmouth	Mountbatten Centre	50 m	17 m (8)	
Stroud	Stratford Park Lido	50 m	17 m	Open-air lido, open from end of May to September.
Stirling	National Swimming Academy	50 m	(6)	Part of the University of Stirling.
Stockport	Grand Central Pools	50 m	(8)	
Street, Somerset	Millfield School	50 m	(8)	School's private pool, only open to staff and students.
Stonehaven	Stonehaven Open Air Pool, Aberdeenshire	50 m	(8)	Council run public pool, only open June to September.
Swansea	Wales National Pool	50 m	21 m (8)	Part of the Swansea University.
Tavistock	Mount Kelly Swim Centre	50 m	16 m (8)	Part of Mount Kelly School and funded by Sport England. A 50m long, 8 lane indoor pool, which is open to the community, swimming clubs and pupils of the school. Opened in September 2016.
Winchester	Winchester Sport & Leisure Park	50 m	(8)	Operated by EveryoneActive for Winchester City Council. Opened in May 2021.

=== Planned or under construction/refurbishment ===
Location	Pool/centre name	Pool dimensions		Further information
Location	Pool/centre name	Length	Width (lanes)	Further information
Redbridge, London		50 m		Architects appointed for new 50 m pool.

== Other notable long-course pools ==
=== Open ===
- Bourne Lido, Bourne, Lincolnshire – 50 by 13 yards (45.7 m × 11.9 m) open air pool
- Brockwell Lido – 160 ft (48.77 m) open air pool; opened in 1937, closed in 1990, and re-opened in 1994
- Jesus Green Swimming Pool, Cambridge – 100 by 15 yards (91.4 m × 13.7 m) open air pool
- Lymington Open Air Sea Water Baths (Lymington Lido) – 361 by 164 feet (110.0 m × 50.0 m) open air pool
- Parliament Hill Lido (Hampstead Heath Lido) – 200 ft × 90 ft (61 m × 27 m) unheated open air pool
- Stonehaven Open Air Pool, Aberdeenshire – 55 yd × 20 yd (50.3 m × 18.3 m) heated seawater open air pool
- Tooting Bec Lido – 100 yd × 33 yd (91.4 m × 30.2 m) unheated open air pool
- Yearsley Swimming Pool, York – 48 yd × 17 yd (43.9 m × 15.5 m) indoor pool

=== Closed ===
- Broomhill Pool, Ipswich – 55 by 20 yards (50.3 m × 18.3 m) open air pool, plus 5-yard (4.6 m) diving pit. Subject of campaign to reopen.
- Coventry Central Baths, Coventry - 50 metres, 8 lanes. Closed 15 February 2020 and will be demolished. Replaced by new 50m pool at Alan Higgs Centre.
- Derby Baths, Blackpool – 50 metres × 21 metres (8 lanes), with diving area and 1,800-seater viewing stadium. Opened in 1939 and closed in 1991.
- Earls Court 1, Earls Court Exhibition Centre. 60m × 30m pool, up to 4m deep. Opened 1937. A 750 tonne retractable floor in three sections covered the pool when not in use and is lowered using water hydraulic rams. Demolished along with the rest of the Exhibition site. Last filled with water (2,250,000 gals) as a feature for the Ideal Home Show in 2011. Technical Manager Ray Simpson, who had maintained the pool since 1969, retired in July 2013. Earls Court has hosted both the 1948 and the 2012 Summer Olympics, but swimming was not held there on either occasion. The pool was most closely associated with the London Boat Show which was held annually from 1960 until 2003.
- Empire Pool, Wembley (now Wembley Arena). Venue for the 1948 Summer Olympics.
- Grange Lido, Cumbria. Open-air sea-water Art Deco 50m pool, opened 1932, closed 1993, with an undecided future but a vigorous campaign for its reopening for swimming.
- Gurnell Leisure Centre, Ealing. Opened 1981, closed in 2020 (it did not reopen following the COVID-19 lockdowns). The council plans to redevelop the centre, with a new 50m pool.
- Leeds International Pool, Leeds – 50 metres, 8 lanes. Closed 21 October 2007; now demolished.
- Murton Colliery Pool, Murton, County Durham – 50 metre open air pool, built in 1961, and closed in 1991 following the closure of the colliery; filled in.
- Wales Empire Pool at Cardiff. Venue for the 1958 British Empire and Commonwealth Games; demolished in 1998 during construction of the Millennium Stadium. Replaced by the Cardiff International Pool.
- White City Stadium swimming pool. Venue for the 1908 Summer Olympics; site demolished in 1985.
- Wigan International Pool, Wigan – 50 metres, 8 lanes. Closed 21 September 2008, and subsequently demolished. Replaced by a 25 × 21 m pool at the Wigan Life Centre.

== See also ==
- History of lidos in the United Kingdom
- List of long course swimming pools in the Republic of Ireland
