= Wales Empire Pool =

Former swimming pool in Cardiff, Wales

- Pwll Nofio'r Gymanwlad
- Interactive map of the Wales Empire Pool area

General information
- Type: Swimming Pool building
- Location: Wood Street, Cardiff, Wales
- Coordinates: 51.4770°N 3.1820°W
- Construction started: January 1956
- Opened: 18 April 1958
- Demolished: June 1998
- Cost: £650,000
- Client: Cardiff City Council

Technical details
- Structural system: Reinforced concrete on steel frame

Design and construction
- Architect: D.M.Davies/J. Dryburgh

The Wales Empire Pool (Welsh: Pwll Nofio'r Gymanwlad), known locally as the Empire Pool, was an international standard swimming pool building, located in Cardiff, Wales from 1958 until it was demolished in 1998. It was a centrepiece for the 1958 British Empire and Commonwealth Games.

== Background ==
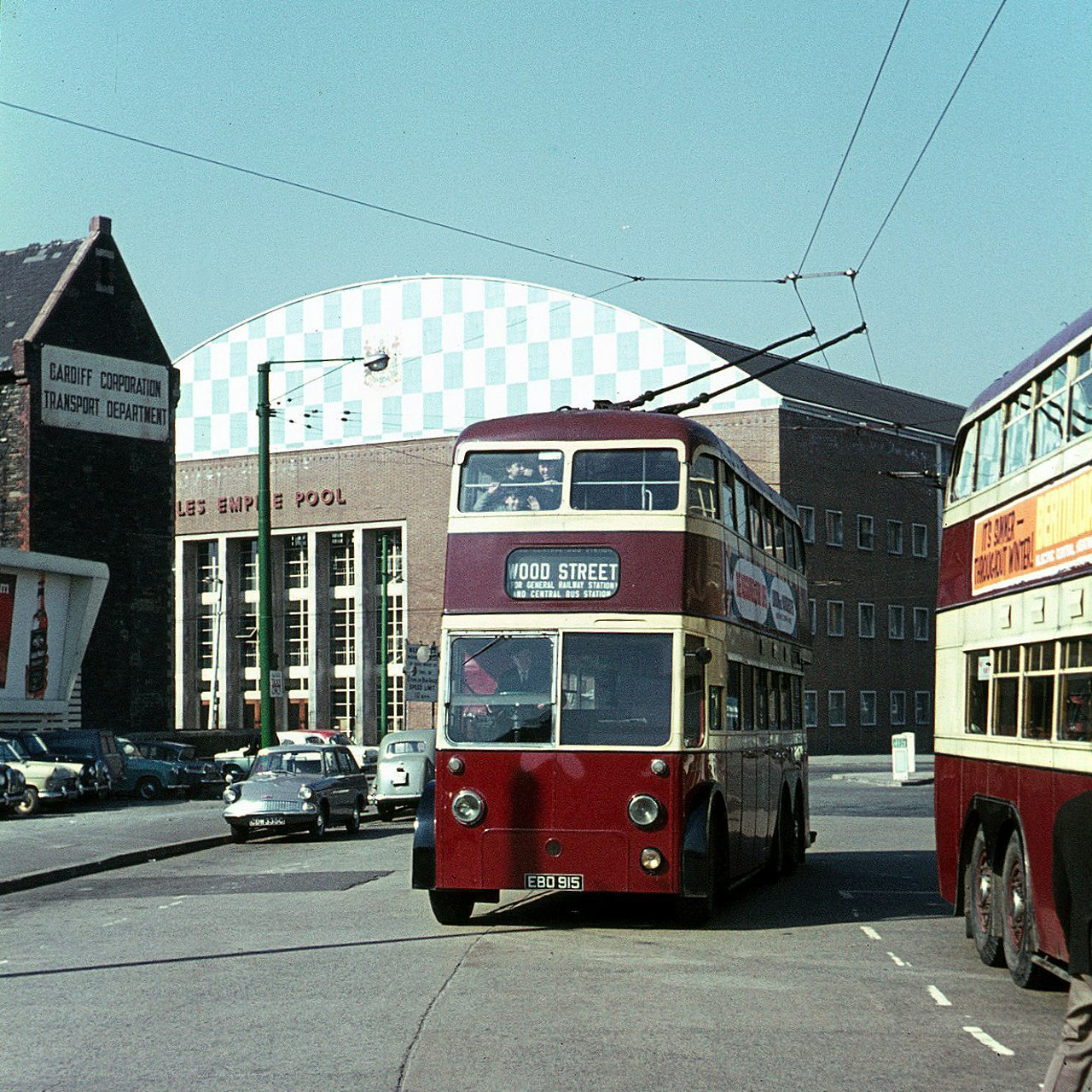
The Wales Empire Pool in 1966

A site on Wood Street in the centre of the Cardiff had been identified in the 1930s as a good location for a new swimming baths. However, the construction of a new pool was not realised until Cardiff was chosen as the hosts of the 1958 British Empire and Commonwealth Games. The pool's site was immediately next to the Cardiff Arms Park, which was the main stadium for the Games.

The building was acclaimed as the first example of modernist architecture in Cardiff, and was similar in design to the Royal Festival Hall in London. It was designed by D. M. Davies, believed to be influenced by Peter Behrens' 1910 AEG turbine factory. The Royal Institute of British Architects differs in opinion, attributing the design to John Dryburgh, the City Architect 1957–74. The structural engineer was Oscar Faber, who was known for his work with reinforced concrete.

Work on the new pool began in January 1956 and the completed building was opened by the Lord Mayor of Cardiff, J. H. Morgan, on 18 April 1958, two months before the Empire Games started. The City Council were initially reluctant to finance the new pool, but agreed to do so when confronted with the ultimatum of "No Pool – No Games". The total cost of construction was £650,000 and the 1958 Empire Games went on to achieve a financial surplus of £37,000.

== Facilities ==
The main attraction of the Empire Pool was the international standard swimming pool, which measured 55 by 20 yards (50.3 m × 18.3 m) with a depth of between 3 and 16 feet (0.91 and 4.88 m), with diving boards. For spectators there were 1,722 permanent seats. In addition to the main pool, there was an Aeratone™ therapeutic bath, Victorian-style Turkish baths, physiotherapy rooms, hot showers, a mikveh used by members of the Jewish community, a restaurant and a large reception area.

In 1970 the main pool was shortened to 50 metres, meeting new international standards.

In 1973 a teaching pool was created for school children, opened by Winifred Mathias, Lord Mayor of Cardiff.

== Demolition ==
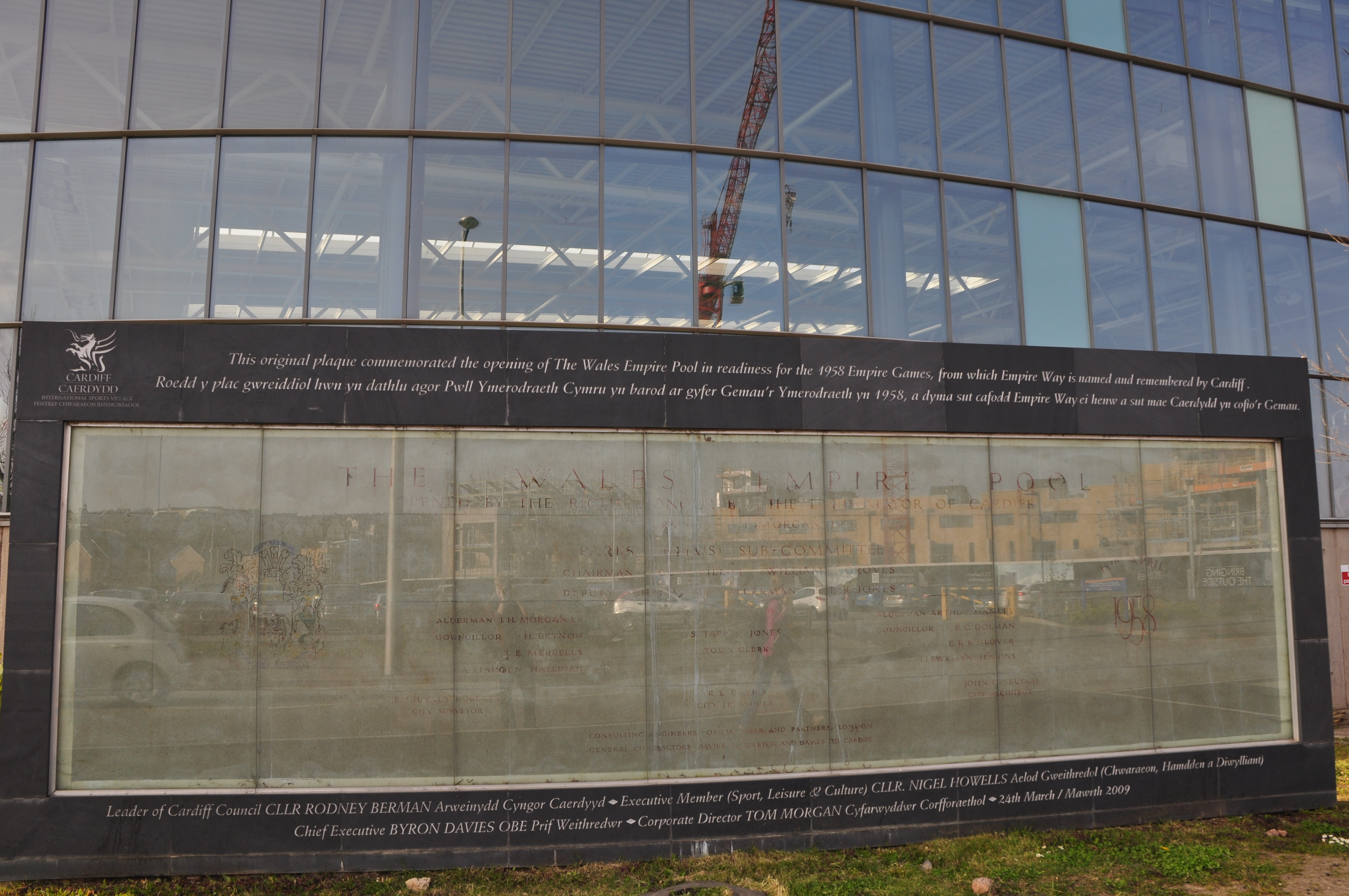
Plaque commemorating the pool

The Empire Pool was demolished in 1998 to make space for the Millennium Stadium, leading to a severe lack of swimming facilities in the South Wales area. In 2003 a new Wales National Pool was opened in Swansea while Cardiff received the £32 million Cardiff International Pool, which opened in Cardiff Bay in February 2008.

== See also ==
- List of Commonwealth Games venues
