= Cardiff International Pool =

Swimming venue in Cardiff, Wales

Cardiff International Pool Pwll Rhyngwladol Caerdydd
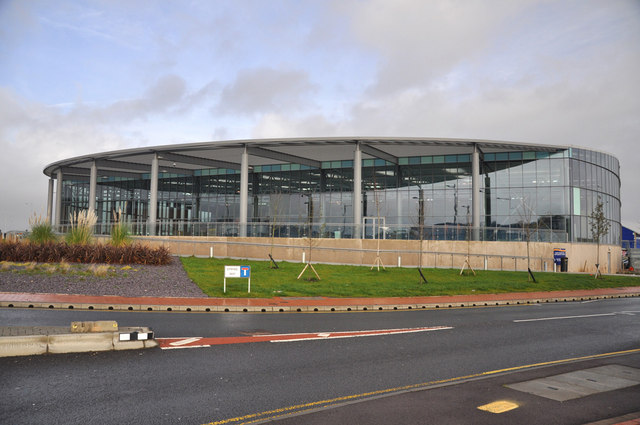
- Cardiff International Pool in 2009
- Interactive map of Cardiff International Pool; Pwll Rhyngwladol Caerdydd
- Location: Olympian Drive, Grangetown, Cardiff, CF11 0JS
- Coordinates: 51.449755°N 3.181078°W
- Owner: City of Cardiff Council
- Operator: Parkwood Leisure
- Type: 2 swimming pools plus diving pools
- Facilities: Second pool 25 m (82 ft) 4-lane indoor waterpark with flume rides, a beach area with water slides, a lazy river and Jacuzzi.

Construction
- Opened: 12 February 2008
- Construction cost: £32 million

Website
- Cardiff International Pool

Cardiff International Pool (Welsh: Pwll Rhyngwladol Caerdydd) is an Olympic-sized swimming pool built as a public-private funded project; with a partnership between Cardiff Council (land owner), OLLC which is a partnership between Orion Land & Leisure and Explore Investments (developers) and Parkwood Leisure (operator). Parkwood won the contract to manage the facility for 10 years, with a projected turnover of £2.5m each year.

The opening of the pool ended 10 years without an Olympic size pool in Wales since the closure and demolition in 1998 of the Empire Pool (which had been built for the Cardiff-hosted 1958 British Empire and Commonwealth Games) to make way for the Millennium Stadium.

== Construction ==
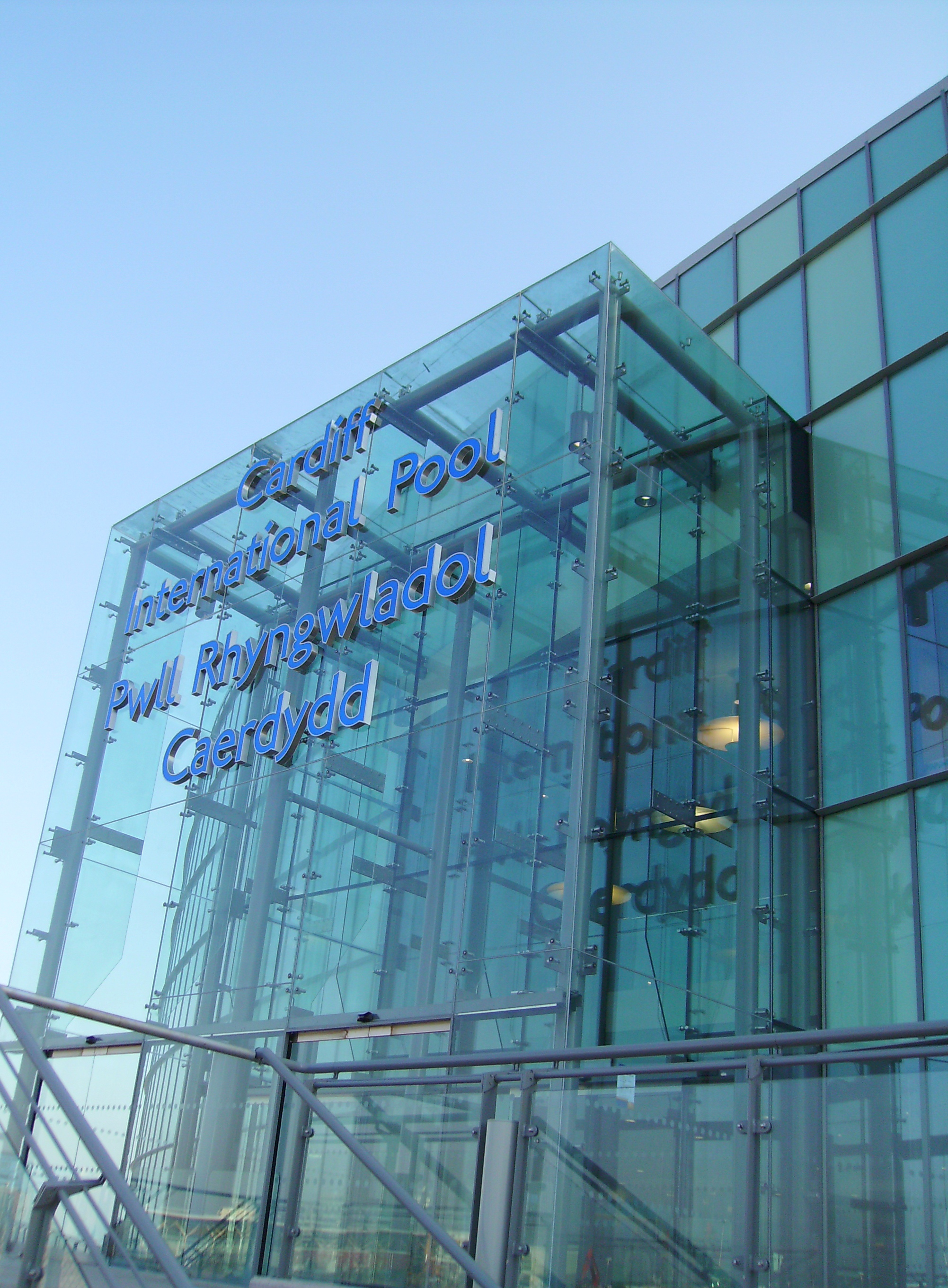
Entrance to the Cardiff International Pool

Construction of the £32 million facility commenced in April 2006 and includes two pools; an Olympic size 50 m (160 ft) 10-lane competition swimming pool with seating for 1,000 spectators and a 25 m (82 ft) 4-lane indoor waterpark with flume rides, a beach area with water slides, a lazy river and Jacuzzi. The centre also has a fitness suite and studios, conference rooms and a café.

The construction of the pool was the subject of a legal dispute.

The pool was also built to support the London 2012 Olympics as a training facility. Several other sporting venues in the city of Cardiff were used for Olympics, such as the Millennium Stadium for football events.

== See also ==
- Sport in Cardiff
- List of Olympic-size swimming pools in the United Kingdom
