= 2025 Celtic Cup =

International netball tournament

Tournament details
- Host country: Scotland
- City: Glasgow
- Venue: Emirates Arena
- Dates: 26–30 November 2025
- Teams: 6
- TV partner(s): BBC iPlayer/BBC Sport; NetballPass

Final positions
- Champions: Uganda (1st title)
- Runners-up: Scotland
- Third place: Wales

Tournament statistics
- Matches played: 15

The 2025 Celtic Cup was an international netball series hosted and organised by Netball Scotland in November 2025. It was the second Celtic Cup netball tournament. The hosts, Scotland were joined by Namibia, Northern Ireland, Uganda, Wales and Zimbabwe. With a team coached by Rashid Mubiru and captained by Mary Cholhok, Uganda won the series after winning all five of their matches. In their final match they defeated Wales 70–48. Uganda's Shadia Nassanga was named Player of the Tournament. The series was broadcast live on BBC iPlayer/BBC Sport and on NetballPass worldwide. Winning the tournament and defeating Wales, saw Uganda move up to 6th in the World Netball Rankings, replacing Wales, who dropped to 7th. This effectively made the tournament a qualifier for the 2027 Netball World Cup. Shortly after the tournament, the top six ranked teams, including Uganda were invited to play at the 2027 Netball World Cup.

== Squads ==
Participating teams and rosters
Namibia	Northern Ireland	Scotland	Uganda	Wales	Zimbabwe
Monique Basson; Imbeleni Frans; Elisia Hambongo; Melitta Hunga; Mirjam Johaness; Rejoice Kambonge; Mendjipe Kaveako; Uendjisuvera Kangumine; Loide Kanyolo; Grace Matyaki; Cornelia Mupenda (c); Anna Shipanga	Lisa Carlin; Niamh Cooper; Ciara Crosbie; Emilia Gordon; Frances Keenan; Emma Magee; Michelle Magee (c); Evelyn McCagherty; Maria McCann; Georgie McGrath; Orla McGeough; Ana Mulholland; Caroline O'Hanlon (vc); Orlaith Rogers; Lauren Walshe	Emma Barrie; Cerys Cairns; Iona Christian (cc); Rachel Conway; Cerys Finn; Lexy Gillies; Beth Goodwin; Hannah Grant; Hannah Leighton; Niamh McCall; Emily Nicholl (cc); Evie Watts	Lillian Achola; Lilian Ajio; Malisera Akello; Gloria Ayaa; Margaret Baagala; Mary Cholhok (c); Faridah Kadondi; Christine Nakitto; Shaffie Nalwanja; Specioza Namukose; Fildauce Namulema; Racheal Nanyonga (c); Shakirah Nassaka; Shadia Nassanga	Ellie Blackwell; Vicky Booth; Millie Carter; Bethan Dyke (c); Celyn Emanuel; Ffion Evans; Nansi Kuti; Zoe Matthewman; Leah Middleton; Caris Morgan; Ellen Morgan; Meg Pilkington; Georgia Rowe; Poppy Tydeman; Phillipa Yarranton	Sharon Bwanali; Claris Kwaramba; Anifa Luya; Thandekile Mahlangu; Nalani Makunde; Sharleen Makusha; Nikki Mandeya; Nicole Muzanenamo; Upenyu Myambo; Thandazile Ndhlovu; Ursula Ndlovu; Prudence Sibanda; Takadanaishe Zimusi
Head Coach: Julene Meyer	Head Coach: Sheonah Forbes	Head Coach: Kath Tetley	Head Coach: Rashid Mubiru	Head Coach: Emily Handyside	Head Coach: Ropafadzo Mutsauki
Assistant coach:	Assistant coach: Shaunagh Craig	Assistant coach:	Assistant coach: Ruth Meeme	Assistant coach:	Assistant coach: Perpetua Siyachitema

Notes

- ^1 Racheal Nanyonga was initially named Uganda's captain. However, she was unable to travel with the team because of visa issues. Mary Cholhok replaced her as captain.

== Milestones ==
On 29 November 2025, Caroline O'Hanlon made her 130th senior appearance for Northern Ireland in the match against Scotland.

== Match officials ==
Umpires

Umpire	Association
Louise Cole	England
Natalie Gregan	England
Gillian Leslie	Scotland
Kate Mann	England
Leonard Masao	South Africa
Lizzie Saunby	England
Louise Travis	England
Elizna Van den Berg	South Africa

Umpire Appointments Panel

Umpire	Association
Heather Gleadall	England
Judith Groves	England
Tracy Skipp	England

== Matches ==
=== Round 1 ===
Wednesday, 26 November 2025	Uganda	65–38	Namibia
14:30 GMT		Report

Wednesday, 26 November 2025	Zimbabwe	57–40	Northern Ireland
17:00 GMT	Sharon Bwanali 29/29 (100%)

Wednesday, 26 November 2025	Scotland	62–54	Wales
19:30 GMT

=== Round 2 ===
Thursday, 27 November 2025	Uganda	72–46	Northern Ireland
14:30 GMT	Mary Cholhok 45/47 (96%); Shadia Nassanga 24/29 (83%); Specioza Namukose 3/3 (100%)	Report	Orlaith Rogers 14/18 (78%); Georgie McGrath 14/15 (93%); Emma Magee 10/10 (100%); Ciara Crosbie 8/9 (89%)

Thursday, 27 November 2025	Scotland	58–33	Namibia
17:00 GMT	Emma Barrie 24/25 (96%); Cerys Cairns 13/18 (72%); Niamh McCall 12/12 (100%); Bethan Goodwin 9/11 (82%)		Uendjisuvera Kangumine 25/28 (89%); Elisia Hambongo 6/8 (75%); Miryam Johannes 2/2 (100%)

Thursday, 27 November 2025	Wales	55–42	Zimbabwe
19:30 GMT	Georgia Rowe 46/47 (98%); Phillipa Yarranton 7/11 (64%); Zoe Matthewman 3/3 (100%)		Sharon Bwanali 34/36 (94%); Ursula Ndlovu 6/9 (67%); Nicole Muzanenhamo 2/3 (67%)

=== Round 3 ===
Friday, 28 November 2025	Zimbabwe	49–39	Namibia
14:30 GMT	Nalani Mukunde 31/32 (97%); Ursula Ndlovu 12/13 (92%); Sharon Bwanali 4/4 (100%); Thandekile Ndhlovu 2/3 (67%)		Uendjisuvera Kangumine 27/33 (82%); Elisia Hambongo 9/11 (82%); Rejoice Kambonge 3/3 (100%)

Friday, 28 November 2025	Wales	70–48	Northern Ireland
17:00 GMT	Georgia Rowe 50/51 (98%); Nansi Kuti 11/13 (85%); Zoe Matthewman 6/7 (86%); Phillipa Yarranton 3/3 (100%)		Orlaith Rogers 30/34 (88%); Emma Magee 12/16 (75%); Georgie McGrath 4/7 (57%); Ciara Crosbie 2/3 (67%)

Friday, 28 November 2025	Scotland	51–53	Uganda
19:30 GMT	Niamh McCall 29/34 (85%); Emma Barrie 22/25 (88%)	Report	Mary Cholhok 41/47 (87%); Shadia Nassanga 12/12 (100%)

=== Round 4 ===
Saturday, 29 November 2025	Wales	67–39	Namibia
12:30 GMT	Georgia Rowe 44/46 (96%); Zoe Matthewman 19/24 (79%); Nansi Kuti 2/3 (67%); Phillipa Yarranton 2/3 (67%)		Elisia Hambongo 24/28 (86%); Uendjisuvera Kangumine 12/16 (75%); Loide Kanyolo 3/6 (50%)

Saturday, 29 November 2025	Uganda	67–54	Zimbabwe
15:00 GMT	Mary Cholhok 41/46 (89%); Shadia Nassanga 25/26 (96%); Specioza Namukose 1/1 (100%)		Sharon Bwanali 36/38 (95%); Ursula Ndlovu 15/16 (94%); Nicole Muzanenhamo 3/3 (100%)

Saturday, 29 November 2025	Scotland	60–43	Northern Ireland
17:30 GMT	Cerys Cairns 24/25 (96%); Emma Barrie 24/25 (96%); Bethan Goodwin 10/10 (100%)		Orlaith Rogers 29/35 (83%); Georgie McGrath 7/9 (78%); Ciara Crosbie 4/5 (80%); Emma Magee 3/4 (75%)

=== Round 5 ===
Sunday, 30 November 2025	Namibia	43–39	Northern Ireland
12:30 GMT	Uendjisuvera Kangumine 33/37 (89%); Loide Kanyolo 8/10 (80%); Elisia Hambongo 2/3 (67%)		Orlaith Rogers 25/28 (89%); Georgie McGrath 9/10 (90%); Emma Magee 5/6 (83%)

Sunday, 30 November 2025	Uganda	70–48	Wales
15:00 GMT	Mary Cholhok 44/51 (86%); Shadia Nassanga 24/25 (96%); Specioza Namukose 2/2 (100%)	Report	Georgia Rowe 26/26 (100%); Nansi Kuti 12/13 (92%); Zoe Matthewman 5/6 (83%); Phillipa Yarranton 5/7 (71%)

Sunday, 30 November 2025	Scotland	54–45	Zimbabwe
17:30 GMT	Emma Barrie 32/34 (94%); Niamh McCall 14/23 (61%); Cerys Cairns 6/11 (55%); Bethan Goodwin 3/3 (100%)		Thandazile Ndhlovu 25/26 (96%); Nalani Makunde 8/9 (89%); Ursula Ndlovu 5/6 (83%); Sharon Bwanali 4/4 (100%); Nicole Muzanenhamo 3/3 (100%)

== Final table ==
Pos	Team	P	W	L	D	GF	GA	GD	Pts
1	Uganda	5	5	0	0	327	237	+90	10
2	Scotland	5	4	1	0	285	228	+57	8
3	Wales	5	3	2	0	294	261	+33	6
4	Zimbabwe	5	2	3	0	247	255	-8	4
5	Namibia	5	1	4	0	192	278	-86	2
6	Northern Ireland	5	0	5	0	216	302	-86	0
