= 2024 Celtic Cup =

International netball tournament

Tournament details
- Host country: Scotland
- City: Glasgow
- Venue: Emirates Arena
- Dates: 7–10 November 2024
- Teams: 4
- TV partner: BBC iPlayer

Final positions
- Champions: Wales (1st title)
- Runners-up: Scotland
- Third place: Zimbabwe

Tournament statistics
- Matches played: 8
- Top scorer(s): Georgia Rowe; 179/184 (97%)

The 2024 Celtic Cup was an international netball series hosted and organised by Netball Scotland in November 2024. It was the inaugural Celtic Cup netball tournament. The hosts, Scotland were joined by Northern Ireland, Wales and Zimbabwe. With a team coached by Emily Handyside and captained by Bethan Dyke, Wales won the series after winning all four of their matches. In the final they defeated Scotland 59–47. Zimbabwe finished third after defeating Northern Ireland 55–49 in a playoff. The series was broadcast live on BBC iPlayer.

== Squads ==
Participating teams and rosters
Northern Ireland	Scotland	Wales	Zimbabwe
Ciara Crosbie; Niamh Cooper; Frances Keenan; Emma Magee; Michelle Magee (vc); Evelyn McCagherty; Maria McCann; Rosa McCloskey; Georgie McGrath; Orla McGeough; Ana Mulholland; Orlaith Rogers; Fionnuala Toner (c); Lauren Walshe	Emma Barrie; Erin Bolland; Kelly Boyle; Iona Christian (cc); Charlotte Dunkley; Anna Fairclough; Cerys Finn; Zara Flett; Hannah Grant; Hannah Leighton; Emma Love; Niamh McCall; Alice McGeachey; Emily Nicholl (cc); Evie Watts	Vicky Booth; Bethan Dyke (c); Celyn Emmanuel; Lucy Howells; Alex Johnson; Nansi Kuti; Zoe Matthewman; Caris Morgan; Ellen Morgan; Leah Middleton; Georgia Rowe; Poppy Tydeman; Phillipa Yarranton	Sharon Bwanali; Blessing Kahari; Felisitus Kwangwa (c); Anifa Luya; Tafadzwa Mawango; Thandiwe Mashore; Elizabeth Mushore (c); Faith Mutero; Kelly Muyambo; Nicole Muzanenamo; Upenyu Myambo; Nobukhosi Ndlovu; Thandazile Ndlovu; Ursula Ndlovu; Chipo Shoko; Zimusi Takadanaighe
Head Coach: Sheonah Forbes	Head Coach: Kath Tetley	Head Coach: Emily Handyside	Head Coach: Ropafadzo Mutsauki
Assistant coach: Debbie Bleakley; Elissa Kent	Assistant coach:	Assistant coach: Natalie Roddy	Assistant coach: Simbarashe Mlambo

== Debuts and milestones ==
- On 8 November 2024, Bethan Dyke made her 75th senior appearance for Wales in the match against Northern Ireland.
- On 9 November 2024, Evie Watts made her senior debut for Scotland against Northern Ireland.
- On 10 November 2024, Poppy Tydeman made her senior debut for Wales against Scotland.

== Match officials ==
Umpires

Umpire	Association
Rhian Edwards	Wales
Tracy-Ann Griffiths	Jamaica
Anso Kemp	South Africa
Tharina Opperman	South Africa
Lizzie Saywell	England

Umpire Appointments Panel

Umpire	Association
Heather Gleadall	England
Jackie Mizon	England
Marielouw Van der Merwe	South Africa

== Round robin stage ==
=== Round 1 ===
Thursday, 7 November 2024	Scotland	56–58	Wales
18.00 GMT	Emma Barrie 32/39 (82%); Niamh McCall 24/30 (80%)	Report	Georgia Rowe 56/57 (98%); Phillipa Yarranton 2/3 (67%)

Thursday, 7 November 2024	Zimbabwe	54–46	Northern Ireland
20.00 GMT	Thandazile Ndhlovu 23/23 (100%); Ursula Ndlovu 15/18 (83%); Tafadzwa Mawango 15/15 (100%)	Report	Orlaith Rogers 27/30 (90%); Emma Magee 19/23 (83%)

=== Round 2 ===
Friday, 8 November 2024	Wales	64–45	Northern Ireland
18:00 GMT	Georgia Rowe 34/35 (97%); Phillipa Yarranton 15/18 (83%); Nansi Kuti 14/16 (88%); Zoe Matthewman 1/2 (50%)	Report	Rosa McCloskey 20/24 (83%); Emma Magee 14/16 (88%); Orlaith Rogers 8/13 (62%); Ciara Crosbie 3/3 (100%); Georgie McGrath 0/1 (0%)

Friday, 8 November 2024	Scotland	54–45	Zimbabwe
20:00 GMT	Niamh McCall 31/35 (89%); Emma Barrie 24/31 (77%)		Thandazile Ndhlovu 36/39 (92%); Ursula Ndlovu 6/6 (100%); Sharon Bwanali 3/3 (100%)

=== Round 3 ===
Saturday, 9 November 2024	Wales	50–46	Zimbabwe
14:00 GMT	Georgia Rowe 37/39 (95%); Phillipa Yarranton 9/15 (60%); Zoe Matthewman 4/5 (80%)	Report	Thandazile Ndhlovu 34/35 (97%); Chipo Shoko 10/15 (67%); Ursula Ndlovu 6/6 (100%)

Saturday, 9 November 2024	Scotland	53–40	Northern Ireland
16.00 GMT	Niamh McCall 24/25 (96%); Emma Barrie 18/25 (72%); Evie Watts 11/16 (69%)		Rosa McCloskey 13/13 (100%); Emma Magee 12/16 (75%); Ciara Crosbie 7/8 (88%); Orlaith Rogers 3/4 (75%); Georgie McGrath 3/4 (75%)

=== Table ===
Pos	Team	P	W	L	D	GF	GA	GD	Pts
1	Wales	3	3	0	0	172	157	+15	6
2	Scotland	3	2	1	0	164	143	+21	4
3	Zimbabwe	3	1	2	0	204	161	+43	2
4	Northern Ireland	3	0	3	0	131	171	-40	0

Qualified for Final
Qualified for 3rd/4th playoff

== Playoffs ==
=== 3rd/4th playoff ===
Sunday, 10 November 2024	Zimbabwe	55–48	Northern Ireland
12:00 GMT	Thandazile Ndhlovu 32/39 (82%); Ursula Ndlovu 16/18 (89%); Chipo Shoko 2/2 (100%)		Rosa McCloskey 13/13 (100%); Emma Magee 12/16 (75%); Georgie McGrath 3/4 (75%)

=== Final ===
Sunday, 10 November 2024	Scotland	47–59	Wales
14:00 GMT	Niamh McCall 28/32 (88%); Emma Barrie 19/31 (61%); Evie Watts 0/1 (0%)		Georgia Rowe 52/53 (98%); Zoe Matthewman 4/5 (80%); Phillipa Yarranton 3/4 (75%)

== Final Placings ==
Rank	Team
1	Wales
2	Scotland
3	Zimbabwe
4	Northern Ireland
