= Netball at the 2026 Commonwealth Games =

- Netball pictogram
- Venue: OVO Hydro
- Dates: 25 July – 2 August 2026
- Competitors: 144 from 12 nations

Medalists
gold medal	New Zealand
silver medal	Jamaica
bronze medal	Australia

Netball at the 2026 Commonwealth Games was the eighth appearance of netball at the Commonwealth Games. The sport was one of the eleven sports contested at the 2026 Commonwealth Games, held in Glasgow, Scotland. This was the eighth edition since its inclusion in 1998, and the second staging within Scotland specifically.

The tournament took place between 25 July and 2 August 2026. All matches were played at the OVO Hydro. New Zealand won the gold medal, defeating Jamaica in the final. Australia won the bronze medal. This was the first Commonwealth Games netball tournament in which Australia did not reach the final.

== Schedule ==
The competition schedule for the netball tournament is as follows:

G	Group stage	CM	Classification matches	½	Semi-finals	B	Bronze medal match	F	Gold medal match

Date Event	Sat 25			Sun 26			Mon 27		Tue 28		Wed 29		Thu 30			Fri 31		Sat 1		Sun 2	
Session →	M	A	E	M	A	E	A	E	A	E	A	E	M	A	E	M	A	M	A	M	A
Women	G			G			G		G		G		G			CM		½		B	F

Detailed fixtures were first released on 26 November 2025.

== Qualification ==
The host nation Scotland qualified automatically. The remaining 11 spots were assigned to the top ranked teams in the World Netball Rankings as of September 1, 2025, with a minimum representation of four of the six CGF regions required.

Means of qualification	Date	Quotas	Qualified
Host Nation	—N/a	1	Scotland
World Netball Rankings	27 November 2025	11	Australia; New Zealand; England; Jamaica; South Africa; Malawi; Northern Ireland; Wales; Trinidad and Tobago; Uganda; Tonga
TOTAL		12	

== Participating CGAs ==
Each of the 12 qualified CGAs could enter up to a total of 12 athletes.

- Australia (12)
- England (12)
- Jamaica (12)
- Malawi (12)
- New Zealand (12)
- Northern Ireland (12)
- Scotland (12)
- South Africa (12)
- Tonga (12)
- Trinidad and Tobago (12)
- Uganda (12)
- Wales (12)

== Umpires ==
- Bronwen Adams
- Angela Armstrong-Lush
- Justin Barnes
- Gary Burgess
- Tania Fink
- Gareth Fowler
- Tracy-Ann Griffiths
- Alison Harrison
- Kate Mann
- Ken Metekingi
- Kristie Simpson
- Georgina Sulley-Beales
- Louise Travis

Umpire Appointments Panel

- Chris Campbell
- Jacqui Jashari
- Fay Meiklejohn
- Tracy Skipp

== Medal summary ==
=== Medal table ===
Rank	Nation	Gold	Silver	Bronze	Total
1	New Zealand	1	0	0	1
2	Jamaica	0	1	0	1
3	Australia	0	0	1	1
Totals (3 entries)		1	1	1	3

=== Medallists ===
Gold	Silver	Bronze
New Zealand; Coach: Noeline Taurua	Jamaica; Coach: Sasha-Gaye Henry-Wright	Australia; Coach: Stacey Marinkovich
Karin Burger (c); Maddy Gordon; Catherine Hall; Georgia Heffernan; Kate Heffernan (vc); Kelly Jackson; Grace Nweke; Kimiora Poi; Mila Reuelu-Buchanan; Martina Salmon; Carys Styhe; Amelia Walmsley	Shamera Sterling-Humphrey (c); Romelda Aiken; Shanice Beckford (vc); Kadie-Ann Dehaney; Rhea Dixon; Nicole Dixon-Rochester; Brie Grierson; Crystal Plummer; Abigale Sutherland; Jodi-Ann Ward; Azara Wilmot; Latanya Wilson (vc)	Liz Watson (c); Kiera Austin; Courtney Bruce; Sophie Dwyer; Sophie Garbin; Matilda Garrett; Georgie Horjus; Sarah Klau; Cara Koenen; Kate Moloney (vc); Jamie-Lee Price; Jo Weston

== Group stage ==
=== Group A ===
Pos	Team	Pld	W	D	L	GF	GA	GD	Pts	Qualification
1	Australia	5	5	0	0	378	191	+187	10	Semi-finals
2	England	5	4	0	1	355	224	+131	8	Semi-finals
3	South Africa	5	3	0	2	340	231	+109	6	Classification matches
4	Malawi	5	2	0	3	233	303	−70	4	Classification matches
5	Tonga	5	1	0	4	219	396	−177	2	Classification matches
6	Northern Ireland	5	0	0	5	191	371	−180	0	Classification matches

Source: Glasgow 2026

25 July 2026; 11:00	Report	Australia	99–38	Tonga	OVO Hydro; Umpires: Angela Armstrong-Lush, Tracy-Ann Griffiths; Reserve umpire: Louise Travis
25 July 2026; 11:00	Report	Scoring by quarter: 23–12, 28–7, 23–9, 25–10			OVO Hydro; Umpires: Angela Armstrong-Lush, Tracy-Ann Griffiths; Reserve umpire: Louise Travis
25 July 2026; 11:00	Report	Cara Koenen 31/31 (100%); Sophie Garbin 31/34 (91%); Kiera Austin 20/21 (95%); Sophie Dwyer 17/19 (89%)		Uneeq Palavi 30/35 (86%); Marie Payn 3/3 (100%); Lavinia Lavea 3/6 (50%); Sovika Pousini 2/2 (100%)	OVO Hydro; Umpires: Angela Armstrong-Lush, Tracy-Ann Griffiths; Reserve umpire: Louise Travis

25 July 2026; 14:00	Report	England	83–34	Northern Ireland	OVO Hydro; Umpires: Justin Barnes, Kristie Simpson; Reserve umpire: Tracy-Ann Griffiths
25 July 2026; 14:00	Report	Scoring by quarter: 24–7, 17–11, 19–8, 23–8			OVO Hydro; Umpires: Justin Barnes, Kristie Simpson; Reserve umpire: Tracy-Ann Griffiths
25 July 2026; 14:00	Report	Eleanor Cardwell 36/38 (95%); Olivia Tchine 25/26 (96%); Sasha Glasgow 12/12 (100%); Lois Pearson 4/5 (80%); Ella Clark 6/8 (75%)		Lisa Bowman 24/28 (86%); Orlaith Rogers 7/9 (78%); Emma Magee 3/4 (75%); Georgie McGrath 0/2 (0%)	OVO Hydro; Umpires: Justin Barnes, Kristie Simpson; Reserve umpire: Tracy-Ann Griffiths

25 July 2026; 21:00	Report	South Africa	65–44	Malawi	OVO Hydro; Umpires: Alison Harrison, Georgina Sulley-Beales; Reserve umpire: Angela Armstrong-Lush
25 July 2026; 21:00	Report	Scoring by quarter: 18–12, 16–11, 15–9, 16–12			OVO Hydro; Umpires: Alison Harrison, Georgina Sulley-Beales; Reserve umpire: Angela Armstrong-Lush
25 July 2026; 21:00	Report	Elmeré van der Berg 48/52 (92%); Kamogelo Maseko 17/18 (94%)		Tendai Masamba 19/23 (83%); Ethel Ng'ambi 14/14 (100%); Mwai Kumwenda 9/9 (100%); Stellah Matelezi 2/3 (67%)	OVO Hydro; Umpires: Alison Harrison, Georgina Sulley-Beales; Reserve umpire: Angela Armstrong-Lush

26 July 2026; 11:00	Report	Australia	66–47	England	OVO Hydro; Umpires: Alison Harrison, Kristie Simpson; Reserve umpire: Ken Metekingi
26 July 2026; 11:00	Report	Scoring by quarter: 18–11, 17–13, 21–11, 10–12			OVO Hydro; Umpires: Alison Harrison, Kristie Simpson; Reserve umpire: Ken Metekingi
26 July 2026; 11:00	Report	Sophie Garbin 41/42 (98%); Kiera Austin 15/19 (79%); Sophie Dwyer 6/6 (100%); Cara Koenen 4/5 (80%)		Olivia Tchine 23/25 (92%); Lois Pearson 14/16 (88%); Eleanor Cardwell 10/13 (77%)	OVO Hydro; Umpires: Alison Harrison, Kristie Simpson; Reserve umpire: Ken Metekingi

26 July 2026; 14:00	Report	Malawi	64–48	Northern Ireland	OVO Hydro; Umpires: Tania Fink, Gary Burgess; Reserve umpire: Kristie Simpson
26 July 2026; 14:00	Report	Scoring by quarter: 19–9, 16–14, 9–15, 20–10			OVO Hydro; Umpires: Tania Fink, Gary Burgess; Reserve umpire: Kristie Simpson
26 July 2026; 14:00	Report	Mwai Kumwenda 57/58 (98%); Ethel Ng'ambi 7/7 (100%)		Lisa Bowman 30/34 (88%); Orlaith Rogers 15/19 (79%); Emma Magee 3/4 (75%)	OVO Hydro; Umpires: Tania Fink, Gary Burgess; Reserve umpire: Kristie Simpson

26 July 2026; 16:00	Report	South Africa	96–42	Tonga	OVO Hydro; Umpires: Justin Barnes, Gareth Fowler; Reserve umpire: Alison Harrison
26 July 2026; 16:00	Report	Scoring by quarter: 26–15, 25–8, 21–12, 24–7			OVO Hydro; Umpires: Justin Barnes, Gareth Fowler; Reserve umpire: Alison Harrison
26 July 2026; 16:00	Report	Rolene Streutker 51/58 (88%); Owethu Ngubane 34/40 (85%); Kamogelo Maseko 11/12 (92%)		Uneeq Palavi 29/32 (91%); Marie Payn 6/7 (86%); Sovika Pousini 6/8 (75%); Lavinia Lavea 1/2 (50%)	OVO Hydro; Umpires: Justin Barnes, Gareth Fowler; Reserve umpire: Alison Harrison

27 July 2026; 14:00	Report	Malawi	38–73	England	OVO Hydro; Umpires: Ken Metekingi, Tania Fink; Reserve umpire: Georgina Sulley-Beales
27 July 2026; 14:00	Report	Scoring by quarter: 9–18, 14–19, 10–18, 5–18			OVO Hydro; Umpires: Ken Metekingi, Tania Fink; Reserve umpire: Georgina Sulley-Beales
27 July 2026; 14:00	Report	Mwayi Kumwenda 20/23 (87%); Ethel Ng'ambi 7/7 (100%); Florence Jeke 5/6 (83%); Tendai Masamba 5/7 (71%); Stellah Matelezi 1/2 (50%)		Olivia Tchine 24/26 (92%); Eleanor Cardwell 21/21 (100%); Lois Pearson 16/17 (94%); Sasha Glasgow 9/10 (90%); Ella Clark 3/3 (100%)	OVO Hydro; Umpires: Ken Metekingi, Tania Fink; Reserve umpire: Georgina Sulley-Beales

27 July 2026; 16:00	Report	Tonga	58–52	Northern Ireland	OVO Hydro; Umpires: Kate Mann, Tracy-Ann Griffiths; Reserve umpire: Bronwen Adams
27 July 2026; 16:00	Report	Scoring by quarter: 15–11, 16–15, 14–11, 15–15			OVO Hydro; Umpires: Kate Mann, Tracy-Ann Griffiths; Reserve umpire: Bronwen Adams
27 July 2026; 16:00	Report	Uneeq Palavi 49/50 (98%); Marie Payn 7/7 (100%); Sovika Pousini 2/4 (50%)		Lisa Bowman 32/41 (78%); Emma Magee 9/13 (69%); Georgie McGraith 8/11 (73%); Orlaith Rogers 3/3 (100%)	OVO Hydro; Umpires: Kate Mann, Tracy-Ann Griffiths; Reserve umpire: Bronwen Adams

28 July 2026; 14:00	Report	South Africa	78–30	Northern Ireland	OVO Hydro; Umpires: Georgina Sulley-Beales, Kate Mann; Reserve umpire: Ken Metekingi
28 July 2026; 14:00	Report	Scoring by quarter: 14–8, 18–10, 21–4, 25–8			OVO Hydro; Umpires: Georgina Sulley-Beales, Kate Mann; Reserve umpire: Ken Metekingi
28 July 2026; 14:00	Report	Elmeré van der Berg 39/42 (93%); Rolene Streutker 25/28 (89%); Kamogelo Maseko 11/11 (100%); Sammy Ngubane 3/4 (75%)		Lisa Bowman 17/24 (71%); Orlaith Rogers 8/10 (80%); Emma Magee 5/8 (63%)	OVO Hydro; Umpires: Georgina Sulley-Beales, Kate Mann; Reserve umpire: Ken Metekingi

28 July 2026; 21:00	Report	Australia	68–32	Malawi	OVO Hydro; Umpires: Gareth Fowler, Tania Fink; Reserve umpire: Angela Armstrong-Lush
28 July 2026; 21:00	Report	Scoring by quarter: 19–6, 19–7, 17–10, 13–9			OVO Hydro; Umpires: Gareth Fowler, Tania Fink; Reserve umpire: Angela Armstrong-Lush
28 July 2026; 21:00	Report	Cara Koenen 25/26 (96%); Sophie Garbin 22/25 (88%); Kiera Austin 13/14 (93%); Sophie Dwyer 8/8 (100%)		Mwayi Kumwenda 17/20 (85%); Tendai Masamba 11/13 (85%); Ethel Ng'ambi 4/5 (80%)	OVO Hydro; Umpires: Gareth Fowler, Tania Fink; Reserve umpire: Angela Armstrong-Lush

29 July 2026; 16:00	Report	England	94–32	Tonga	OVO Hydro; Umpires: Alison Harrison, Ken Metekingi; Reserve umpire: Tracy-Ann Griffiths
29 July 2026; 16:00	Report	Scoring by quarter: 27–8, 18–6, 24–11, 25–7			OVO Hydro; Umpires: Alison Harrison, Ken Metekingi; Reserve umpire: Tracy-Ann Griffiths
29 July 2026; 16:00	Report	Eleanor Cardwell 54/59 (92%); Sasha Glasgow 18/23 (78%); Ella Clark 12/15 (80%); Olivia Tchine 10/11 (91%)		Uneeq Palavi 27/30 (90%); Lavinia Lavea 4/6 (67%); Marie Payn 1/2 (50%)	OVO Hydro; Umpires: Alison Harrison, Ken Metekingi; Reserve umpire: Tracy-Ann Griffiths

29 July 2026; 21:00	Report	Australia	57–47	South Africa	OVO Hydro; Umpires: Tania Fink, Louise Travis; Reserve umpire: Gareth Fowler
29 July 2026; 21:00	Report	Scoring by quarter: 14–13, 18–8, 13–14, 12–12			OVO Hydro; Umpires: Tania Fink, Louise Travis; Reserve umpire: Gareth Fowler
29 July 2026; 21:00	Report	Sophie Garbin 33/34 (97%); Kiera Austin 15/23 (65%); Cara Koenen 6/7 (86%); Sophie Dwyer 3/4 (75%)		Elmeré van der Berg 39/44 (89%); Kamogelo Maseko 4/4 (100%); Sammy Ngubane 4/6 (67%)	OVO Hydro; Umpires: Tania Fink, Louise Travis; Reserve umpire: Gareth Fowler

30 July 2026; 09:00	Report	Malawi	55–49	Tonga	OVO Hydro; Umpires: Louise Travis, Alison Harrison; Reserve umpire: Tania Fink
30 July 2026; 09:00	Report	Scoring by quarter: 14–15, 15–11, 14–13, 12–10			OVO Hydro; Umpires: Louise Travis, Alison Harrison; Reserve umpire: Tania Fink
30 July 2026; 09:00	Report	Mwayi Kumwenda 45/46 (98%); Ethel Ng'ambi 10/11 (91%)		Uneeq Palavi 35/37 (95%); Marie Payn 11/11 (100%); Sovika Pousini 3/4 (75%)	OVO Hydro; Umpires: Louise Travis, Alison Harrison; Reserve umpire: Tania Fink

30 July 2026; 16:00	Report	Australia	88–27	Northern Ireland	OVO Hydro; Umpires: Gary Burgess, Angela Armstrong-Lush; Reserve umpire: Alison Harrison
30 July 2026; 16:00	Report	Scoring by quarter: 27–6, 20–4, 19–12, 22–5			OVO Hydro; Umpires: Gary Burgess, Angela Armstrong-Lush; Reserve umpire: Alison Harrison
30 July 2026; 16:00	Report	Cara Koenen 57/58 (98%); Sophie Garbin 15/15 (100%); Sophie Dwyer 11/11 (100%); Georgie Horjus 5/7 (71%)		Lisa Bowman 15/18 (83%); Orlaith Rogers 7/10 (70%); Georgie McGrath 3/5 (60%); Emma Magee 2/3 (67%)	OVO Hydro; Umpires: Gary Burgess, Angela Armstrong-Lush; Reserve umpire: Alison Harrison

30 July 2026; 21:00	Report	England	58–54	South Africa	OVO Hydro; Umpires: Bronwen Adams, Georgina Sulley-Beales; Reserve umpire: Kristie Simpson
30 July 2026; 21:00	Report	Scoring by quarter: 11–17, 17–12, 15–10, 15–15			OVO Hydro; Umpires: Bronwen Adams, Georgina Sulley-Beales; Reserve umpire: Kristie Simpson
30 July 2026; 21:00	Report	Olivia Tchine 41/43 (95%); Lois Pearson 17/17 (100%)		Elmere van der Berg 48/53 (91%); Sammy Ngubane 6/7 (86%)	OVO Hydro; Umpires: Bronwen Adams, Georgina Sulley-Beales; Reserve umpire: Kristie Simpson

=== Group B ===
Pos	Team	Pld	W	D	L	GF	GA	GD	Pts	Qualification
1	New Zealand	5	5	0	0	333	202	+131	10	Semi-finals
2	Jamaica	5	4	0	1	303	195	+108	8	Semi-finals
3	Uganda	5	3	0	2	303	255	+48	6	Classification matches
4	Scotland	5	2	0	3	276	258	+18	4	Classification matches
5	Wales	5	1	0	4	236	284	−48	2	Classification matches
6	Trinidad and Tobago	5	0	0	5	138	395	−257	0	Classification matches

Source: Glasgow 2026

25 July 2026; 9:00	Report	New Zealand	74–44	Scotland	OVO Hydro; Umpires: Kate Mann, Bronwen Adams; Reserve umpire: Alison Harrison
25 July 2026; 9:00	Report	Scoring by quarter: 19–11, 16–13, 18–13, 21–7			OVO Hydro; Umpires: Kate Mann, Bronwen Adams; Reserve umpire: Alison Harrison
25 July 2026; 9:00	Report	Grace Nweke 29/30 (97%); Amelia Walmsley 27/33 (82%); Georgia Heffernan 11/11 (100%); Martina Salmon 7/9 (78%)		Emma Barrie 20/23 (87%); Niamh McCall 12/17 (71%); Cerys Cairns 10/14 (71%); Bethan Goodwin 2/5 (40%)	OVO Hydro; Umpires: Kate Mann, Bronwen Adams; Reserve umpire: Alison Harrison

25 July 2026; 16:00	Report	Wales	50–59	Uganda	OVO Hydro; Umpires: Gary Burgess, Ken Metekingi; Reserve umpire: Tania Fink
25 July 2026; 16:00	Report	Scoring by quarter: 13–15, 18–13, 8–17, 11–14			OVO Hydro; Umpires: Gary Burgess, Ken Metekingi; Reserve umpire: Tania Fink
25 July 2026; 16:00	Report	Georgia Rowe 30/30 (100%); Phillipa Yarranton 16/17 (94%); Zoe Matthewman 4/5 (80%)		Shadiah Nassanga 27/27 (100%); Mary Cholhok 23/25 (92%); Alice Isoto 9/9 (100%)	OVO Hydro; Umpires: Gary Burgess, Ken Metekingi; Reserve umpire: Tania Fink

25 July 2026; 19:00	Report	Jamaica	81–22	Trinidad and Tobago	OVO Hydro; Umpires: Louise Travis, Gareth Fowler; Reserve umpire: Bronwen Adams
25 July 2026; 19:00	Report	Scoring by quarter: 24–5, 19–7, 17–8, 21–2			OVO Hydro; Umpires: Louise Travis, Gareth Fowler; Reserve umpire: Bronwen Adams
25 July 2026; 19:00	Report	Azara Wilmot 33/41 (80%); Romelda Aiken-George 25/27 (93%); Shanice Beckford 16/16 (100%); Rhea Dixon 7/11 (64%)		Afeisha Noel 17/19 (89%); Joelisa Cooper 5/7 (71%)	OVO Hydro; Umpires: Louise Travis, Gareth Fowler; Reserve umpire: Bronwen Adams

26 July 2026; 9:00	Report	Wales	47–56	Scotland	OVO Hydro; Umpires: Louise Travis, Angela Armstrong-Lush; Reserve umpire: Kate Mann
26 July 2026; 9:00	Report	Scoring by quarter: 8–16, 13–12, 12–15, 14–13			OVO Hydro; Umpires: Louise Travis, Angela Armstrong-Lush; Reserve umpire: Kate Mann
26 July 2026; 9:00	Report	Nansi Kuti 29/30 (97%); Phillipa Yarranton 10/11 (91%); Georgia Rowe 8/9 (89%)		Emma Barrie 39/41 (95%); Niamh McCall 17/20 (85%)	OVO Hydro; Umpires: Louise Travis, Angela Armstrong-Lush; Reserve umpire: Kate Mann

26 July 2026; 19:00	Report	Uganda	80–36	Trinidad and Tobago	OVO Hydro; Umpires: Tracy-Ann Griffiths, Ken Metekingi; Reserve umpire: Gary Burgess
26 July 2026; 19:00	Report	Scoring by quarter: 19–10, 21–9, 16–11, 24–6			OVO Hydro; Umpires: Tracy-Ann Griffiths, Ken Metekingi; Reserve umpire: Gary Burgess
26 July 2026; 19:00	Report	Mary Cholhok 32/41 (78%); Alice Isoto 21/21 (100%); Shadiah Nassanga 19/20 (95%); Racheal Nanyonga 8/10 (80%)		Afeisha Noel 24/27 (89%); Demisha Henry 7/8 (88%); Joelisa Cooper 5/6 (83%)	OVO Hydro; Umpires: Tracy-Ann Griffiths, Ken Metekingi; Reserve umpire: Gary Burgess

26 July 2026; 21:00	Report	New Zealand	53–48	Jamaica	OVO Hydro; Umpires: Georgina Sulley-Beales, Bronwen Adams; Reserve umpire: Louise Travis
26 July 2026; 21:00	Report	Scoring by quarter: 14–12, 12–13, 13–10, 14–13			OVO Hydro; Umpires: Georgina Sulley-Beales, Bronwen Adams; Reserve umpire: Louise Travis
26 July 2026; 21:00	Report	Grace Nweke 47/56 (84%); Georgia Heffernan 6/8 (75%)		Romelda Aiken-George 34/38 (89%); Shanice Beckford 14/15 (93%)	OVO Hydro; Umpires: Georgina Sulley-Beales, Bronwen Adams; Reserve umpire: Louise Travis

27 July 2026; 19:00	Report	Uganda	49–55	Jamaica	OVO Hydro; Umpires: Gary Burgess, Justin Barnes; Reserve umpire: Kristie Simpson
27 July 2026; 19:00	Report	Scoring by quarter: 15–12, 10–17, 14–14, 10–12			OVO Hydro; Umpires: Gary Burgess, Justin Barnes; Reserve umpire: Kristie Simpson
27 July 2026; 19:00	Report	Mary Cholhok 34/37 (92%); Shadiah Nassanga 12/12 (100%); Racheal Nanyonga 3/4 (75%)		Romelda Aiken-George 39/42 (93%); Rhea Dixon 9/12 (75%); Shanice Beckford 3/4 (75%)	OVO Hydro; Umpires: Gary Burgess, Justin Barnes; Reserve umpire: Kristie Simpson

27 July 2026; 21:00	Report	Scotland	77−27	Trinidad and Tobago	OVO Hydro; Umpires: Alison Harrison, Angela Armstrong-Lush; Reserve umpire: Gareth Fowler
27 July 2026; 21:00	Report	Scoring by quarter: 24–6, 18−8, 15–7, 20−6			OVO Hydro; Umpires: Alison Harrison, Angela Armstrong-Lush; Reserve umpire: Gareth Fowler
27 July 2026; 21:00	Report	Cerys Cairns 50/56 (89%); Emma Barrie 21/21 (100%); Niamh McCall 3/5 (60%); Bethan Goodwin 3/7 (43%)		Afeisha Noel 16/17 (94%); Makayla Grant 3/3 (100%); Joelisa Cooper 3/4 (75%); Shaniya Morgan 3/7 (43%); Demisha Henry 2/3 (67%)	OVO Hydro; Umpires: Alison Harrison, Angela Armstrong-Lush; Reserve umpire: Gareth Fowler

28 July 2026; 16:00	Report	Wales	74–30	Trinidad and Tobago	OVO Hydro; Umpires: Tracy-Ann Griffiths, Kristie Simpson; Reserve umpire: Gary Burgess
28 July 2026; 16:00	Report	Scoring by quarter: 23–8, 20−11, 15–5, 16−6			OVO Hydro; Umpires: Tracy-Ann Griffiths, Kristie Simpson; Reserve umpire: Gary Burgess
28 July 2026; 16:00	Report	Georgia Rowe 31/31 (100%); Nansi Kuti 23/30 (77%); Phillipa Yarranton 10/11 (91%); Zoe Matthewman 10/13 (77%)		Afeisha Noel 15/17 (88%); Makayla Grant 6/7 (86%); Demisha Henry 5/7 (71%); Joelisa Cooper 4/5 (80%)	OVO Hydro; Umpires: Tracy-Ann Griffiths, Kristie Simpson; Reserve umpire: Gary Burgess

28 July 2026; 19:00	Report	Uganda	50–58	New Zealand	OVO Hydro; Umpires: Louise Travis, Bronwen Adams; Reserve umpire: Justin Barnes
28 July 2026; 19:00	Report	Scoring by quarter: 14–15, 11–13, 10–16, 15–14			OVO Hydro; Umpires: Louise Travis, Bronwen Adams; Reserve umpire: Justin Barnes
28 July 2026; 19:00	Report	Mary Cholhok 30/33 (91%); Shadiah Nassanga 19/20 (95%); Racheal Nanyonga 1/2 (50%)		Grace Nweke 19/20 (95%); Martina Salmon 16/20 (80%); Amelia Walsmley 14/16 (88%); Georgia Heffernan 9/10 (90%)	OVO Hydro; Umpires: Louise Travis, Bronwen Adams; Reserve umpire: Justin Barnes

29 July 2026; 14:00	Report	Jamaica	45–43	Scotland	OVO Hydro; Umpires: Angela Armstrong-Lush, Kristie Simpson; Reserve umpire: Georgina Sulley-Beales
29 July 2026; 14:00	Report	Scoring by quarter: 15–9, 12–14, 8–12, 10−8			OVO Hydro; Umpires: Angela Armstrong-Lush, Kristie Simpson; Reserve umpire: Georgina Sulley-Beales
29 July 2026; 14:00	Report	Azara Wilmot 28/35 (80%); Shanice Beckford 15/18 (83%); Rhea Dixon 2/4 (50%)		Emma Barrie 22/27 (81%); Niamh McCall 21/26 (81%)	OVO Hydro; Umpires: Angela Armstrong-Lush, Kristie Simpson; Reserve umpire: Georgina Sulley-Beales

29 July 2026; 19:00	Report	New Zealand	65–37	Wales	OVO Hydro; Umpires: Gary Burgess, Justin Barnes; Reserve umpire: Kate Mann
29 July 2026; 19:00	Report	Scoring by quarter: 17–7, 19–8, 15–10, 14–12			OVO Hydro; Umpires: Gary Burgess, Justin Barnes; Reserve umpire: Kate Mann
29 July 2026; 19:00	Report	Martina Salmon 30/35 (86%); Amelia Walsmley 28/30 (93%); Georgia Heffernan 7/8 (88%)		Georgia Rowe 18/19 (95%); Zoe Matthewman 9/9 (100%); Nansi Kuti 5/6 (83%); Phillipa Yarranton 5/7 (71%)	OVO Hydro; Umpires: Gary Burgess, Justin Barnes; Reserve umpire: Kate Mann

30 July 2026; 11:00	Report	Scotland	56–65	Uganda	OVO Hydro; Umpires: Gareth Fowler, Ken Metekingi; Reserve umpire: Justin Barnes
30 July 2026; 11:00	Report	Scoring by quarter: 12–17, 10–16, 16–16, 18–13			OVO Hydro; Umpires: Gareth Fowler, Ken Metekingi; Reserve umpire: Justin Barnes
30 July 2026; 11:00	Report	Cerys Cairns 23/26 (88%); Emma Barrie 22/26 (85%); Niamh McCall 10/12 (83%); Bethan Goodwin 1/1 (100%)		Mary Cholhok 46/55 (84%); Shadiah Nassanga 19/20 (95%)	OVO Hydro; Umpires: Gareth Fowler, Ken Metekingi; Reserve umpire: Justin Barnes

30 July 2026; 14:00	Report	New Zealand	83–23	Trinidad and Tobago	OVO Hydro; Umpires: Tracy-Ann Griffiths, Kate Mann; Reserve umpire: Louise Travis
30 July 2026; 14:00	Report	Scoring by quarter: 21–4, 20–9, 23–5, 19–5			OVO Hydro; Umpires: Tracy-Ann Griffiths, Kate Mann; Reserve umpire: Louise Travis
30 July 2026; 14:00	Report	Grace Nweke 34/36 (94%); Amelia Walmsley 34/38 (89%); Martina Salmon 15/16 (94%)		Afeisha Noel 21/24 (88%); Joelisa Cooper 2/3 (67%)	OVO Hydro; Umpires: Tracy-Ann Griffiths, Kate Mann; Reserve umpire: Louise Travis

30 July 2026; 19:00	Report	Jamaica	74–28	Wales	OVO Hydro; Umpires: Tania Fink, Justin Barnes; Reserve umpire: Ken Metekingi
30 July 2026; 19:00	Report	Scoring by quarter: 13–11, 23–7, 16–5, 22–5			OVO Hydro; Umpires: Tania Fink, Justin Barnes; Reserve umpire: Ken Metekingi
30 July 2026; 19:00	Report	Romelda Aiken-George 26/30 (87%); Shanice Beckford 26/32 (81%); Azara Wilmot 16/19 (84%); Rhea Dixon 6/8 (75%)		Georgia Rowe 18/19 (95%); Phillipa Yarranton 6/8 (75%); Zoe Matthewman 3/3 (100%); Nansi Kuti 1/1 (100%)	OVO Hydro; Umpires: Tania Fink, Justin Barnes; Reserve umpire: Ken Metekingi

== Classification matches ==
=== Eleventh place match ===
31 July 2026; 09:00	Report	Northern Ireland	78–39	Trinidad and Tobago	OVO Hydro; Umpires: Tracy-Ann Griffiths, Alison Harrison; Reserve umpire: Kate Mann
31 July 2026; 09:00	Report	Scoring by quarter: 19–10, 21–8, 20–10, 18–11			OVO Hydro; Umpires: Tracy-Ann Griffiths, Alison Harrison; Reserve umpire: Kate Mann
31 July 2026; 09:00	Report	Lisa Bowman 45/51 (88%); Orlaith Rogers 14/15 (93%); Georgie McGrath 10/10 (100%); Emma Magee 9/9 (100%)		Afeisha Noel 26/31 (84%); Joelisa Cooper 6/6 (100%); Demisha Henry 6/7 (86%); Janeisha Cassimy 1/1 (100%)	OVO Hydro; Umpires: Tracy-Ann Griffiths, Alison Harrison; Reserve umpire: Kate Mann

=== Ninth place match ===
31 July 2026; 11:00	Report	Tonga	63–53	Wales	OVO Hydro; Umpires: Angela Armstrong-Lush, Louise Travis; Reserve umpire: Gareth Fowler
31 July 2026; 11:00	Report	Scoring by quarter: 10–14, 19–15, 19–9, 15–15			OVO Hydro; Umpires: Angela Armstrong-Lush, Louise Travis; Reserve umpire: Gareth Fowler
31 July 2026; 11:00	Report	Uneeq Palavi 49/52 (94%); Marie Payn 14/14 (100%)		Georgia Rowe 35/36 (97%); Phillipa Yarranton 18/20 (90%)	OVO Hydro; Umpires: Angela Armstrong-Lush, Louise Travis; Reserve umpire: Gareth Fowler

=== Seventh place match ===
31 July 2026; 14:00	Report	Malawi	54–47	Scotland	OVO Hydro; Umpires: Gary Burgess, Tania Fink; Reserve umpire: Georgina Sulley-Beales
31 July 2026; 14:00	Report	Scoring by quarter: 17–12, 13–11, 12–12, 12–12			OVO Hydro; Umpires: Gary Burgess, Tania Fink; Reserve umpire: Georgina Sulley-Beales
31 July 2026; 14:00	Report	Mwayi Kumwenda 44/47 (94%); Ethel Ng'ambi 8/8 (100%); Tendai Masamba 2/2 (100%)		Emma Barrie 26/28 (93%); Niamh McCall 21/23 (91%)	OVO Hydro; Umpires: Gary Burgess, Tania Fink; Reserve umpire: Georgina Sulley-Beales

=== Fifth place match ===
31 July 2026; 16:00	Report	South Africa	62–54	Uganda	OVO Hydro; Umpires: Justin Barnes, Kristie Simpson; Reserve umpire: Bronwen Adams
31 July 2026; 16:00	Report	Scoring by quarter: 12–17, 20–11, 16–13, 14–13			OVO Hydro; Umpires: Justin Barnes, Kristie Simpson; Reserve umpire: Bronwen Adams
31 July 2026; 16:00	Report	Elmeré van der Berg 48/49 (98%); Kamogelo Maseko 14/16 (88%)		Mary Cholhok 34/38 (89%); Shadiah Nassanga 20/22 (91%); Mercy Batamuliza 0/2 (0%)	OVO Hydro; Umpires: Justin Barnes, Kristie Simpson; Reserve umpire: Bronwen Adams

== Medal round ==
Semi-finals
1 August 2026
Australia	45
Jamaica	46
1 August 2026
New Zealand	61
England	54

Gold medal match
2 August 2026
Jamaica	48
New Zealand	56
Bronze medal match
2 August 2026
Australia	68
England	50

=== Semi-finals ===
1 August 2026; 9:00	Report	New Zealand	61–54	England	OVO Hydro; Umpires: Bronwen Adams, Georgina Sulley-Beales; Reserve umpire: Justin Barnes
1 August 2026; 9:00	Report	Scoring by quarter: 16–11, 13–13, 17–13, 15–17			OVO Hydro; Umpires: Bronwen Adams, Georgina Sulley-Beales; Reserve umpire: Justin Barnes
1 August 2026; 9:00	Report	Grace Nweke 52/57 (91%); Georgia Heffernan 9/10 (90%)		Eleanor Cardwell 23/24 (96%); Olivia Tchine 16/17 (94%); Lois Pearson 11/16 (69%); Sasha Glasgow 5/5 (100%)	OVO Hydro; Umpires: Bronwen Adams, Georgina Sulley-Beales; Reserve umpire: Justin Barnes

1 August 2026; 13:00	Report	Australia	45–46	Jamaica	OVO Hydro; Umpires: Gareth Fowler, Ken Metekingi; Reserve umpire: Kristie Simpson
1 August 2026; 13:00	Report	Scoring by quarter: 10–13, 11–10, 14–12, 10–11			OVO Hydro; Umpires: Gareth Fowler, Ken Metekingi; Reserve umpire: Kristie Simpson
1 August 2026; 13:00	Report	Kiera Austin 22/23 (96%); Cara Koenen 18/20 (90%); Sophie Garbin 4/4 (100%); Sophie Dwyer 1/3 (33%)		Romelda Aiken 29/32 (91%); Shanice Beckford 17/18 (94%)	OVO Hydro; Umpires: Gareth Fowler, Ken Metekingi; Reserve umpire: Kristie Simpson

=== Bronze medal match ===
2 August 2026; 09:00	Report	Australia	68–50	England	OVO Hydro; Umpires: Gareth Fowler, Ken Metekingi; Reserve umpire: Kristie Simpson
2 August 2026; 09:00	Report	Scoring by quarter: 19–11, 16–13, 14–12, 19–14			OVO Hydro; Umpires: Gareth Fowler, Ken Metekingi; Reserve umpire: Kristie Simpson
2 August 2026; 09:00	Report	Sophie Garbin 46/50 (92%); Kiera Austin 22/24 (92%)		Olivia Tchine 25/25 (100%); Eleanor Cardwell 15/17 (88%); Lois Pearson 8/9 (89%); Sasha Glasgow 2/4 (50%)	OVO Hydro; Umpires: Gareth Fowler, Ken Metekingi; Reserve umpire: Kristie Simpson

=== Gold medal match ===
2 August 2026; 13:00	Report	Jamaica	48–56	New Zealand	OVO Hydro; Umpires: Bronwen Adams, Georgina Sulley-Beales; Reserve umpire: Justin Barnes
2 August 2026; 13:00	Report	Scoring by quarter: 13–16, 12–12, 11–13, 12–15			OVO Hydro; Umpires: Bronwen Adams, Georgina Sulley-Beales; Reserve umpire: Justin Barnes
2 August 2026; 13:00	Report	Romelda Aiken 32/36 (89%); Shanice Beckford 16/18 (89%)		Grace Nweke 48/54 (89%); Georgia Heffernan 8/9 (89%)	OVO Hydro; Umpires: Bronwen Adams, Georgina Sulley-Beales; Reserve umpire: Justin Barnes

== Final standings ==
Place	Nation
Gold	New Zealand
Silver	Jamaica
Bronze	Australia
4	England
5	South Africa
6	Uganda
7	Malawi
8	Scotland
9	Tonga
10	Wales
11	Northern Ireland
12	Trinidad and Tobago

== Tournament statistics ==
Goals
Rank	Player	Country	Pl	G	A	%
1	Grace Nweke	New Zealand	6	229	253	90.5
2	Elmeré van der Berg	South Africa	5	222	240	92.5
3	Uneeq Palavi	Tonga	6	219	236	92.8
4	Mary Cholhok	Uganda	6	199	229	86.9
5	Sophie Garbin	Australia	7	192	204	94.1
5	Mwai Kumwenda	Malawi	6	192	203	94.6
7	Romelda Aiken	Jamaica	6	185	205	90.2
8	Olivia Tchine	England	7	164	173	94.8
9	Eleanor Cardwell	England	6	159	172	92.4
10	Lisa Bowman	Northern Ireland	6	158	199	79.4
