= 2025 New Zealand netball tour of Great Britain =

International netball tour

Tournament details
- Host countries: England; Scotland
- Dates: 9–19 November 2025
- Teams: England; New Zealand; Scotland
- TV partner(s): Sky Sport (New Zealand); Sky Sports (UK/Ireland); YouTube; BBC iPlayer/BBC Sport; NetballPass

Tournament statistics
- Matches played: 5

The 2025 New Zealand netball tour of Great Britain, also known as the Northern Tour, saw New Zealand play Scotland and England in a series of five test matches, played in November 2025. The New Zealand team was coached by Yvette McCausland-Durie and captained by Karin Burger. The tour began on 9 November with New Zealand defeating Scotland 63–41. New Zealand subsequently defeated Scotland in the first two tests. New Zealand then went on to play England in three tests. They won this series 2–1. The entire tour was broadcast live on Sky Sport in New Zealand. The Scotland New Zealand series was broadcast live on BBC iPlayer and BBC Sport. The England New Zealand series, also referred to as the Vitality Netball International Series was broadcast live on Sky Sports Mix and Sky Sports YouTube in the United Kingdom and Ireland and by Netball Pass worldwide.

== Squads ==
Participating teams and rosters
England	New Zealand	Scotland
Halimat Adio; Jasmine Brown; Eleanor Cardwell; Amy Carter; Beth Cobden; Funmi Fadoju; Sasha Glasgow; Helen Housby; Lois Pearson; Emma Rayner; Jessica Shaw; Olivia Tchine; Fran Williams (c)	Karin Burger (c); Maddy Gordon; Catherine Hall; Georgia Heffernan; Kate Heffernan; Kelly Jackson (vc); Parris Mason; Grace Nweke; Kimiora Poi; Mila Reulu-Buchanan; Martina Salmon; Carys Stythe; Elisapeta Toeava; Amelia Walmsley	Emma Barrie; Cerys Cairns; Iona Christian (cc); Rachel Conway; Cerys Finn; Beth Goodwin; Hannah Grant; Hannah Leighton; Emma Love; Niamh McCall; Jazmine Moore; Emily Nicholl (cc); Evie Watts
Head Coach: Jess Thirlby	Head Coach: Yvette McCausland-Durie	Head Coach: Kath Tetley

== Debuts ==
- On 9 November, Carys Stythe made her senior debut for New Zealand against Scotland.
- On 15 November, Jasmine Brown made her senior debut for England against New Zealand.

== Scotland New Zealand series ==
=== Match officials ===
Umpires

Umpire	Association
Louise Cole	England
Rhian Edwards	Wales
Caswell Palmer	Jamaica

Umpire Appointments Panel

Umpire	Association
Anne Abraitis	Scotland

=== First Test ===
Sunday, 9 November 2025; 16:00 GMT	Stats	Scotland	41–63	New Zealand	Playsport Arena
Sunday, 9 November 2025; 16:00 GMT	Stats	Scoring by quarter: 10–16, 22–33, 33–49, 41–63			Playsport Arena
Sunday, 9 November 2025; 16:00 GMT	Stats	Emma Barrie 22/25 (88%); Niamh McCall 8/15 (53%); Cerys Cairns 8/11 (73%); Beth Goodwin 3/6 (50%)		Martina Salmon 33/37 (89%); Amelia Walmsley 30/33 (91%)	Playsport Arena

=== Second Test ===
Tuesday, 11 November 2025; 19:30 GMT	Stats	Scotland	48–80	New Zealand	Playsport Arena
Tuesday, 11 November 2025; 19:30 GMT	Stats	Scoring by quarter: 15–21, 27–44, 41–60, 48–80			Playsport Arena
Tuesday, 11 November 2025; 19:30 GMT	Stats	Emma Barrie 20/24 (83%); Niamh McCall 20/24 (83%); Beth Goodwin 6/7 (86%); Cerys Cairns 2/3 (67%)		Grace Nweke 34/37 (92%); Martina Salmon 24/25 (96%); Amelia Walmsley 13/16 (81%); Georgia Heffernan 9/9 (100%)	Playsport Arena

== England New Zealand series ==
=== Match officials ===
Umpires

Umpire	Association
Bronwen Adams	Australia
Tamara Buriani-Gennai	Australia
Georgina Sulley-Beales	Australia

Umpire Appointments Panel

Umpire	Association
Heather Gleadall	England
Tracy Skipp	England

=== First Test ===
Saturday, 15 November 2025; 17:00 GMT	Stats	England	58–61	New Zealand	Copper Box Arena
Saturday, 15 November 2025; 17:00 GMT	Stats	Scoring by quarter: 14–15, 30–33, 47–47, 58–61			Copper Box Arena
Saturday, 15 November 2025; 17:00 GMT	Stats	Olivia Tchine 31/33 (94%); Helen Housby 20/22 (91%); Eleanor Cardwell 7/10 (70%)		Grace Nweke 52/55 (95%); Georgia Heffernan 5/5 (100%); Amelia Walmsley 4/4 (100%)	Copper Box Arena

=== Second Test ===
Sunday, 16 November 2025; 15:00 GMT	Stats	England	61–58	New Zealand	Copper Box Arena
Sunday, 16 November 2025; 15:00 GMT	Stats	Scoring by quarter: 12–13, 27–29, 46–42, 61–58			Copper Box Arena
Sunday, 16 November 2025; 15:00 GMT	Stats	Olivia Tchine 38/44 (86%); Helen Housby 23/24 (96%)		Grace Nweke 50/50 (100%); Georgia Heffernan 7/7 (100%); Amelia Walmsley 1/1 (100%)	Copper Box Arena

=== Third Test ===
Wednesday, 19 November 2025; 19:00 GMT	Stats	England	49–55	New Zealand	AO Arena
Wednesday, 19 November 2025; 19:00 GMT	Stats	Scoring by quarter: 14–11, 25–27, 38–42, 49–55			AO Arena
Wednesday, 19 November 2025; 19:00 GMT	Stats	Helen Housby 25/28 (89%); Olivia Tchine 13/16 (81%); Sasha Glasgow 6/7 (86%); Lois Pearson 5/8 (63%)		Grace Nweke 43/48 (90%); Georgia Heffernan 12/15 (80%)	AO Arena
