= Netball at the 2022 Commonwealth Games =

- Venue: National Exhibition Centre
- Dates: 29 July – 7 August 2022
- Competitors: 144 from 12 nations

Medalists
gold medal	Australia
silver medal	Jamaica
bronze medal	New Zealand

Netball at the 2022 Commonwealth Games was the seventh appearance of Netball at the Commonwealth Games. The sport was one of the 21 sports contested at the 2022 Commonwealth Games, held in Birmingham, England. This was the seventh edition since its inclusion in 1998, and the second staging within England specifically.

The tournament took place between 29 July and 7 August 2022. Australia won the gold medal, defeating Jamaica in the final. New Zealand won the bronze medal.

== Schedule ==
The competition schedule for the netball tournament was as follows:

G	Group stage	CM	Classification matches	½	Semi-finals	B	Bronze medal match	F	Gold medal match

Date Event	Fri 29		Sat 30		Sun 31		Mon 1		Tue 2		Wed 3		Thu 4			Fri 5		Sat 6		Sun 7	
Session →	A	E	A	E	A	E	A	E	A	E	A	E	M	A	E	M	A	M	A	A	E
Women	G		G		G		G		G		G		G			CM		½		B	F

Detailed fixtures were first released on 12 November 2021, then updated with the full complement of qualified teams on 4 March 2022.

== Venue ==
The tournament was originally set to be held in Coventry Arena. However, the sport's heightened profile in light of England winning the 2018 tournament led to the National Exhibition Centre being chosen instead.

Five other sports - badminton, boxing, para powerlifting, table tennis, and weightlifting - will also take place in the venue.

== Qualification ==
Twelve nations from at least four CGF regions qualify for the netball tournament at the 2022 Commonwealth Games:

- The host nation.
- The top five nations in the World Netball Rankings as of 28 July 2021, excluding the host nation.
- The top six nations as of 31 January 2022, excluding nations already qualified.

Means of qualification	Date	Quotas	Qualified
Host Nation	—N/a	1	England
World Netball Rankings	28 July 2021	5	Australia; New Zealand; Jamaica; South Africa; Malawi
World Netball Rankings	31 January 2022	6	Uganda; Scotland; Wales; Trinidad and Tobago; Northern Ireland; Barbados
TOTAL		12	

== Group stage ==
=== Group A ===
Pos	Team	Pld	W	D	L	GF	GA	GD	Pts	Qualification
1	Jamaica	5	5	0	0	378	205	+173	10	Semi-finals
2	Australia	5	4	0	1	386	187	+199	8	Semi-finals
3	South Africa	5	3	0	2	323	275	+48	6	Classification matches
4	Wales	5	2	0	3	235	306	−71	4	Classification matches
5	Scotland	5	1	0	4	224	302	−78	2	Classification matches
6	Barbados	5	0	0	5	150	421	−271	0	Classification matches

Source: Birmingham 2022

29 July 2022; 14:00	Report	Australia	95–18	Barbados	National Exhibition Centre; Umpires: Gary Burgess; Alison Harrison
29 July 2022; 14:00	Report	Austin 6/6 (100%); Bueta 44/48 (92%); Koenen 35/38 (92%); Wood 10/15 (67%)		Agard 4/7 (57%); Blackman 6/8 (75%); Holder 2/3 (67%); Wharton 6/13 (46%)	National Exhibition Centre; Umpires: Gary Burgess; Alison Harrison

29 July 2022; 18:00	Report	Jamaica	72–43	Wales	National Exhibition Centre; Umpires: Louise Travis; Ken Metekingi
29 July 2022; 18:00	Report	Beckford 8/12 (67%); Fowler 32/33 (97%); Nelson 29/29 (100%); Robison 3/5 (60%)		Creak 22/27 (81%); Roberts 3/5 (60%); Rowe 18/19 (95%)	National Exhibition Centre; Umpires: Louise Travis; Ken Metekingi

30 July 2022; 12:00	Report	Australia	83–30	Scotland	National Exhibition Centre; Umpires: Tracy-Ann Griffiths; Anso Kemp
30 July 2022; 12:00	Report	Austin 10/13 (77%); Bueta 33/34 (97%); Koenen 36/37 (97%); Wood 4/4 (100%)		Barrie 7/8 (88%); Goodwin 15/16 (94%); Love 2/4 (50%); McCall 6/10 (60%)	National Exhibition Centre; Umpires: Tracy-Ann Griffiths; Anso Kemp

30 July 2022; 18:00	Report	Jamaica	68–49	South Africa	National Exhibition Centre; Umpires: Angela Armstrong-Lush; Joshua Bowring
30 July 2022; 18:00	Report	Beckford 15/18 (83%); Fowler 33/33 (100%); Nelson 14/14 (100%); Robison 6/6 (100%)		Rademan 6/8 (75%) van der Berg 13/15 (87%); Venter 30/36 (83%)	National Exhibition Centre; Umpires: Angela Armstrong-Lush; Joshua Bowring

31 July 2022; 14:00	Report	South Africa	91–36	Barbados	National Exhibition Centre; Umpires: Gareth Fowler; Bronwen Adams
31 July 2022; 14:00	Report	Rademan 12/16 (75%); Taljaard 18/20 (90%) van der Berg 47/49 (96%); Venter 14/16 (88%)		Blackman 21/24 (88%); Wharton 15/21 (71%)	National Exhibition Centre; Umpires: Gareth Fowler; Bronwen Adams

31 July 2022; 20:00	Report	Scotland	42–48	Wales	National Exhibition Centre; Umpires: Ken Metekingi; Kate Wright
31 July 2022; 20:00	Report	Barrie 15/22 (68%); Goodwin 20/27 (74%); McCall 7/13 (54%)		Creak 12/16 (75%); Rowe 36/38 (95%)	National Exhibition Centre; Umpires: Ken Metekingi; Kate Wright

1 August 2022; 12:00	Report	Australia	74–49	South Africa	National Exhibition Centre; Umpires: Gareth Fowler; Angela Armstrong-Lush
1 August 2022; 12:00	Report	Austin 12/14 (86%); Bueta 34/34 (100%); Koenen 14/14 (100%); Wood 14/14 (100%)		Rademan 4/5 (80%); Taljaard 4/5 (80%) van der Berg 10/10 (100%); Venter 31/38 (82%)	National Exhibition Centre; Umpires: Gareth Fowler; Angela Armstrong-Lush

1 August 2022; 14:00	Report	Jamaica	103–24	Barbados	National Exhibition Centre; Umpires: Elizna Van Den Berg; Anso Kemp
1 August 2022; 14:00	Report	Beckford 12/13 (92%); Fowler 24/27 (89%); Nelson 58/60 (97%); Robison 9/9 (100%)		Agard 10/12 (83%); Blackman 3/3 (100%); Holder 1/3 (33%); Wharton 10/15 (67%)	National Exhibition Centre; Umpires: Elizna Van Den Berg; Anso Kemp

2 August 2022; 12:00	Report	Australia	79–33	Wales	National Exhibition Centre; Umpires: Gareth Fowler; Louise Travis
2 August 2022; 12:00	Report	Bueta 26/27 (96%); Koenen 49/54 (91%); Wood 4/4 (100%)		Creak 11/11 (100%); Roberts 6/11 (55%); Rowe 16/18 (89%)	National Exhibition Centre; Umpires: Gareth Fowler; Louise Travis

2 August 2022; 14:00	Report	Jamaica	78–34	Scotland	National Exhibition Centre; Umpires: Joshua Bowring; Alison Harrison
2 August 2022; 14:00	Report	Beckford 5/6 (83%); Fowler 37/37 (100%); Nelson 33/35 (94%); Robison 3/6 (50%)		Barrie 12/17 (71%); Goodwin 18/19 (95%); McCall 4/8 (50%)	National Exhibition Centre; Umpires: Joshua Bowring; Alison Harrison

3 August 2022; 12:00	Report	South Africa	69–51	Wales	National Exhibition Centre; Umpires: Angela Armstrong-Lush; Bronwen Adams
3 August 2022; 12:00	Report	Taljaard 1/1 (100%) van der Berg 35/39 (90%); Venter 33/36 (92%)		Creak 26/37 (70%); Roberts 4/5 (80%); Rowe 21/25 (84%)	National Exhibition Centre; Umpires: Angela Armstrong-Lush; Bronwen Adams

3 August 2022; 18:00	Report	Scotland	72–28	Barbados	National Exhibition Centre; Umpires: Tara Warner; Kate Wright
3 August 2022; 18:00	Report	Barrie 20/25 (80%); Goodwin 30/34 (88%); McCall 22/25 (88%)		Agard 19/23 (83%); Holder 4/6 (67%); Wharton 5/8 (63%)	National Exhibition Centre; Umpires: Tara Warner; Kate Wright

4 August 2022; 09:00	Report	Australia	55–57	Jamaica	National Exhibition Centre; Umpires: Gareth Fowler; Angela Armstrong-Lush
4 August 2022; 09:00	Report	Bueta 36/39 (92%); Wood 19/22 (86%)		Beckford 10/10 (100%); Fowler 47/50 (94%)	National Exhibition Centre; Umpires: Gareth Fowler; Angela Armstrong-Lush

4 August 2022; 11:00	Report	Wales	60–44	Barbados	National Exhibition Centre; Umpires: Louise Travis; Elizna Van Den Berg
4 August 2022; 11:00	Report	Creak 30/33 (91%); Roberts 9/14 (64%); Rowe 21/24 (88%)		Agard 4/5 (80%); Blackman 19/19 (100%); Wharton 21/27 (78%)	National Exhibition Centre; Umpires: Louise Travis; Elizna Van Den Berg

4 August 2022; 19:00	Report	South Africa	65–46	Scotland	National Exhibition Centre; Umpires: Ken Metekingi; Kate Wright
4 August 2022; 19:00	Report	Rademan 6/7 (86%) van der Berg 17/17 (100%); Venter 42/44 (95%)		Barrie 12/14 (86%); Goodwin 21/25 (84%); McCall 13/15 (87%)	National Exhibition Centre; Umpires: Ken Metekingi; Kate Wright

=== Group B ===
Pos	Team	Pld	W	D	L	GF	GA	GD	Pts	Qualification
1	England (H)	5	5	0	0	321	169	+152	10	Semi-finals
2	New Zealand	5	4	0	1	325	188	+137	8	Semi-finals
3	Uganda	5	3	0	2	256	206	+50	6	Classification matches
4	Malawi	5	2	0	3	258	262	−4	4	Classification matches
5	Northern Ireland	5	1	0	4	155	299	−144	2	Classification matches
6	Trinidad and Tobago	5	0	0	5	136	327	−191	0	Classification matches

Source: Birmingham 2022
(H) Hosts

29 July 2022; 12:00	Report	England	74–22	Trinidad and Tobago	National Exhibition Centre; Umpires: Elizna Van Den Berg; Kate Wright
29 July 2022; 12:00	Report	Cardwell 30/30 (100%); Drakeford-Lewis 3/4 (75%); Harten 25/30 (83%); Housby 16/24 (67%)		Cooper 10/13 (77%); Noel 12/15 (80%)	National Exhibition Centre; Umpires: Elizna Van Den Berg; Kate Wright

29 July 2022; 20:00	Report	New Zealand	79–20	Northern Ireland	National Exhibition Centre; Umpires: Anso Kemp; Joshua Bowring
29 July 2022; 20:00	Report	Mes 5/13 (38%); Nweke 29/31 (94%); Selby-Rickit 25/27 (93%); Wilson 20/22 (91%)		Bowman 4/7 (57%); Crosbie 9/16 (56%); Magee 6/10 (60%); McGrath 1/3 (33%)	National Exhibition Centre; Umpires: Anso Kemp; Joshua Bowring

30 July 2022; 14:00	Report	England	66–41	Malawi	National Exhibition Centre; Umpires: Tara Warner; Gareth Fowler
30 July 2022; 14:00	Report	Cardwell 31/33 (94%); Harten 21/25 (84%); Housby 14/18 (78%)		Chimaliro 4/5 (80%); Kumwenda 18/21 (86%); Mvula 19/22 (86%)	National Exhibition Centre; Umpires: Tara Warner; Gareth Fowler

30 July 2022; 20:00	Report	New Zealand	53–40	Uganda	National Exhibition Centre; Umpires: Gary Burgess; Bronwen Adams
30 July 2022; 20:00	Report	Nweke 32/37 (86%); Selby-Rickit 7/8 (88%); Wilson 14/15 (93%)		Cholhok 19/22 (86%); Eyaru 16/21 (76%); Proscovia 5/8 (63%)	National Exhibition Centre; Umpires: Gary Burgess; Bronwen Adams

31 July 2022; 12:00	Report	Malawi	54–41	Northern Ireland	National Exhibition Centre; Umpires: Angela Armstrong-Lush; Tracy-Ann Griffiths
31 July 2022; 12:00	Report	Chimaliro 4/4 (100%); Kumwenda 29/32 (91%); Mvula 15/19 (79%); Simtowe 6/6 (100%)		Bowman 1/3 (33%); Crosbie 18/22 (82%); Magee 22/27 (81%)	National Exhibition Centre; Umpires: Angela Armstrong-Lush; Tracy-Ann Griffiths

31 July 2022; 18:00	Report	Uganda	62–28	Trinidad and Tobago	National Exhibition Centre; Umpires: Louise Travis; Tara Warner
31 July 2022; 18:00	Report	Cholhok 28/32 (88%); Eyaru 9/11 (82%); Nassanga 25/25 (100%)		Cooper 8/13 (62%); Noel 20/23 (87%)	National Exhibition Centre; Umpires: Louise Travis; Tara Warner

1 August 2022; 18:00	Report	England	71–27	Northern Ireland	National Exhibition Centre; Umpires: Alison Harrison; Bronwen Adams
1 August 2022; 18:00	Report	Cardwell 40/45 (89%); Drakeford-Lewis 11/12 (92%); Housby 20/20 (100%)		Bowman 8/11 (73%); Crosbie 8/12 (67%); Magee 9/13 (69%); McGrath 2/2 (100%)	National Exhibition Centre; Umpires: Alison Harrison; Bronwen Adams

1 August 2022; 20:00	Report	New Zealand	69–50	Malawi	National Exhibition Centre; Umpires: Gary Burgess; Joshua Bowring
1 August 2022; 20:00	Report	Nweke 52/55 (95%); Selby-Rickit 13/15 (87%); Wilson 4/5 (80%)		Chimaliro 5/6 (83%); Kumwenda 27/31 (87%); Mvula 14/17 (82%); Simtowe 4/4 (100%)	National Exhibition Centre; Umpires: Gary Burgess; Joshua Bowring

2 August 2022; 18:00	Report	England	56–35	Uganda	National Exhibition Centre; Umpires: Tara Warner; Ken Metekingi
2 August 2022; 18:00	Report	Cardwell 27/30 (90%); Harten 14/17 (82%); Housby 15/15 (100%)		Cholhok 6/7 (86%); Eyaru 12/14 (86%); Nassanga 9/12 (75%); Proscovia 8/9 (89%)	National Exhibition Centre; Umpires: Tara Warner; Ken Metekingi

2 August 2022; 20:00	Report	New Zealand	80–24	Trinidad and Tobago	National Exhibition Centre; Umpires: Kate Wright; Elizna Van Den Berg
2 August 2022; 20:00	Report	Mes 8/10 (80%); Nweke 37/39 (95%); Selby-Rickit 19/22 (86%); Wilson 16/16 (100%)		Cooper 13/15 (87%); Noel 11/12 (92%)	National Exhibition Centre; Umpires: Kate Wright; Elizna Van Den Berg

3 August 2022; 12:00	Report	Uganda	63–26	Northern Ireland	National Exhibition Centre; Umpires: Tracy-Ann Griffiths; Gary Burgess
3 August 2022; 12:00	Report	Cholhok 41/46 (89%); Eyaru 8/9 (89%); Nassanga 14/15 (93%)		Bowman 2/8 (25%); Crosbie 14/20 (70%); Magee 7/11 (64%); McGrath 3/5 (60%)	National Exhibition Centre; Umpires: Tracy-Ann Griffiths; Gary Burgess

3 August 2022; 18:00	Report	Malawi	70–30	Trinidad and Tobago	National Exhibition Centre; Umpires: Louise Travis; Anso Kemp
3 August 2022; 18:00	Report	Chimaliro 16/16 (100%); Kumwenda 27/28 (96%); Mvula 22/26 (85%); Simtowe 5/6 (83%)		Cooper 2/4 (50%); Hollingsworth 5/9 (56%); Noel 23/26 (88%)	National Exhibition Centre; Umpires: Louise Travis; Anso Kemp

4 August 2022; 14:00	Report	Trinidad and Tobago	32–41	Northern Ireland	National Exhibition Centre; Umpires: Anso Kemp; Alison Harrison
4 August 2022; 14:00	Report	Cooper 7/9 (78%); Hollingsworth 7/9 (78%); Noel 18/18 (100%)		Bowman 4/8 (50%); Crosbie 27/34 (79%); Magee 8/14 (57%); McGrath 2/3 (67%)	National Exhibition Centre; Umpires: Anso Kemp; Alison Harrison

4 August 2022; 16:00	Report	Malawi	43–56	Uganda	National Exhibition Centre; Umpires: Tara Warner; Gary Burgess
4 August 2022; 16:00	Report	Chimaliro 14/15 (93%); Kumwenda 22/23 (96%); Mvula 4/6 (67%); Simtowe 3/3 (100%)		Cholhok 31/33 (94%); Eyaru 22/23 (96%); Proscovia 3/3 (100%)	National Exhibition Centre; Umpires: Tara Warner; Gary Burgess

4 August 2022; 21:00	Report	New Zealand	44–54	England	National Exhibition Centre; Umpires: Joshua Bowring; Bronwen Adams
4 August 2022; 21:00	Report	Nweke 23/29 (79%); Selby-Rickit 13/13 (100%); Wilson 8/9 (89%)		Cardwell 26/29 (90%); Harten 5/6 (83%); Housby 23/26 (88%)	National Exhibition Centre; Umpires: Joshua Bowring; Bronwen Adams

== Classification matches ==
=== Eleventh place match ===
5 August 2022; 09:00	Report	Barbados	31–63	Trinidad and Tobago	National Exhibition Centre; Umpires: Tracy-Ann Griffiths; Anso Kemp
5 August 2022; 09:00	Report	Agard 14/19 (74%); Blackman 9/10 (90%); Holder 1/1 (100%); Wharton 7/11 (64%)		Cooper 25/31 (81%); Noel 38/43 (88%)	National Exhibition Centre; Umpires: Tracy-Ann Griffiths; Anso Kemp

=== Ninth place match ===
5 August 2022; 11:30	Report	Scotland	43–33	Northern Ireland	National Exhibition Centre; Umpires: Louise Travis; Alison Harrison
5 August 2022; 11:30	Report	Goodwin 23/27 (85%); McCall 20/26 (77%)		Bowman 4/8 (50%); Crosbie 17/24 (71%); Magee 12/17 (71%)	National Exhibition Centre; Umpires: Louise Travis; Alison Harrison

=== Seventh place match ===
5 August 2022; 14:30	Report	Wales	56–62	Malawi	National Exhibition Centre; Umpires: Ken Metekingi; Kate Wright
5 August 2022; 14:30	Report	Creak 8/10 (80%); Roberts 1/2 (50%); Rowe 47/49 (96%)		Chimaliro 3/4 (75%); Kumwenda 49/50 (98%); Simtowe 10/11 (91%)	National Exhibition Centre; Umpires: Ken Metekingi; Kate Wright

=== Fifth place match ===
5 August 2022; 17:00	Report	South Africa	48–54	Uganda	National Exhibition Centre; Umpires: Tara Warner; Gary Burgess
5 August 2022; 17:00	Report	Rademan 6/7 (86%) van der Berg 17/18 (94%); Venter 25/29 (86%)		Cholhok 31/35 (89%); Eyaru 21/24 (88%); Nassanga 2/2 (100%)	National Exhibition Centre; Umpires: Tara Warner; Gary Burgess

== Medal round ==
Semi-finals
6 August 2022
Jamaica	67
New Zealand	51
6 August 2022
England	51
Australia	60

Gold medal match
7 August 2022
Jamaica	51
Australia	55
Bronze medal match
7 August 2022
New Zealand	55
England	48

=== Semi-finals ===
6 August 2022; 09:00	Report	Jamaica	67–51	New Zealand	National Exhibition Centre; Umpires: Joshua Bowring; Bronwen Adams
6 August 2022; 09:00	Report	Beckford 10/10 (100%); Fowler 54/54 (100%); Nelson 3/3 (100%)		Nweke 24/24 (100%); Selby-Rickit 14/16 (88%); Wilson 13/15 (87%)	National Exhibition Centre; Umpires: Joshua Bowring; Bronwen Adams

6 August 2022; 14:30	Report	England	51–60	Australia	National Exhibition Centre; Umpires: Gareth Fowler; Angela Armstrong-Lush
6 August 2022; 14:30	Report	Cardwell 22/24 (92%); Harten 16/17 (94%); Housby 13/14 (93%)		Bueta 43/44 (98%); Wood 17/20 (85%)	National Exhibition Centre; Umpires: Gareth Fowler; Angela Armstrong-Lush

=== Bronze medal match ===
7 August 2022; 13:30	Report	New Zealand	55–48	England	National Exhibition Centre; Umpires: Joshua Bowring; Bronwen Adams
7 August 2022; 13:30	Report	Nweke 44/48 (92%); Selby-Rickit 11/14 (79%)		Cardwell 31/34 (91%); Harten 4/5 (80%); Housby 13/17 (76%)	National Exhibition Centre; Umpires: Joshua Bowring; Bronwen Adams

=== Gold medal match ===
7 August 2022; 20:30	Report	Jamaica	51–55	Australia	National Exhibition Centre; Umpires: Gareth Fowler; Angela Armstrong-Lush
7 August 2022; 20:30	Report	Scoring by quarter: 12–14, 17–15, 10–16, 12–10			National Exhibition Centre; Umpires: Gareth Fowler; Angela Armstrong-Lush
7 August 2022; 20:30	Report	Beckford 5/5 (100%); Fowler 46/47 (98%)		Bueta 37/37 (100%); Koenen 15/15 (100%); Wood 3/5 (60%)	National Exhibition Centre; Umpires: Gareth Fowler; Angela Armstrong-Lush

== Final standings ==
Place	Nation
Gold	Australia
Silver	Jamaica
Bronze	New Zealand
4	England
5	Uganda
6	South Africa
7	Malawi
8	Wales
9	Scotland
10	Northern Ireland
11	Trinidad and Tobago
12	Barbados

== Medallists ==
Gold	Silver	Bronze
Australia; Coach: Stacey Marinkovich	Jamaica; Coach: Connie Francis	New Zealand; Coach: Noeline Taurua
Liz Watson (c); Sunday Aryang; Gretel Bueta; Courtney Bruce; Ashleigh Brazill; Paige Hadley; Sarah Klau; Cara Koenen; Kate Moloney; Kiera Austin; Jo Weston; Stephanie Wood	Jhaniele Fowler-Reid (c); Shanice Beckford; Kadie-Ann Dehaney; Nicole Dixon-Rochester; Shadian Hemmings; Shimona Nelson; Rebekah Robinson; Shamera Sterling; Adean Thomas; Jodi-Ann Ward; Khadijah Williams; Latanya Wilson	Gina Crampton (c); Sulu Fitzpatrick; Kate Heffernan; Kayla Johnson; Kelly Jury; Phoenix Karaka; Bailey Mes; Grace Nweke; Shannon Saunders; Te Paea Selby-Rickit; Whitney Souness; Maia Wilson
