= Scotland national netball team =

National netball team

Scotland
- Nickname(s): Scottish Thistles
- Association: Netball Scotland
- Confederation: Europe Netball
- Head coach: Kath Tetley
- Asst coach: Lesley MacDonald
- Manager: Karen McElveen
- Co-captains: Iona Christian; Emily Nicholl
- World ranking: 10th
Light	Dark

First international
- England 25–3 Scotland; GEC Ground, Wembley, 7 May 1949

Netball World Cup
- Appearances: (Debuted in 1963)
- 2023 placing: 10th
- Best result: 6th (1971, 1975, 1983)

Commonwealth Games
- Appearances: (Debuted in 2014)
- 2026 placing: 8th
- Best result: 8th (2026)

The Scotland national netball team represents Scotland in international netball tournaments such as the Netball World Cup, Netball at the Commonwealth Games and the Netball Europe Open Championships. As of 1 September 2025, Scotland are listed 10th on the World Netball Rankings.

== History ==
=== Early tests ===
Scotland made their Test debut on 7 May 1949 with a 25–3 defeat to England. The match was played at the General Electric Company ground on Preston Road, Wembley during the 1949 England Scotland Wales netball series. Scotland also played Wales for the first time on the same day, losing 14–13. On 12 May 1951, Scotland hosted their first home international, defeating Northern Ireland 21–7 in Glasgow. The 1950s saw Scotland play in 20 matches, mainly against England, Northern Ireland and Wales. However, they also played Australia and South Africa for the first time. On 21 April 1956 they lost 7–25 to Australia and on 23 March 1959 they lost 8–31 to South Africa.

=== Netball Super League ===
Scotland effectively competed in the Netball Super League. Between 2008 and 2011 they played as Glasgow Wildcats. One of the main aims of forming the Glasgow Wildcats franchise was to help Scotland prepare for the 2014 Commonwealth Games. Denise Holland was subsequently appointed joint head coach of both the Wildcats and Scotland. Between 2017 and 2024 they played as the Sirens. Gail Parata served as the joint head coach of both Sirens and Scotland. At the 2019 Netball World Cup, eleven of the Scotland squad were Sirens players.

== Tournament history ==
=== Major tournaments ===
==== Netball World Cup ====
Scotland have competed in every Netball World Cup tournament, except in 2011 when they failed to qualify. The highest position they have finished is 6th which they achieved on three occasions, in 1971, 1975 and 1983.

Tournaments	Place
1963 World Netball Tournament	8th
1967 World Netball Tournament	7th
1971 World Netball Tournament	6th
1975 World Netball Tournament	6th
1979 World Netball Tournament	9th
1983 World Netball Tournament	6th
1987 World Netball Tournament	9th
1991 World Netball Championships	9th
1995 World Netball Championships	22nd
1999 World Netball Championships	20th
2003 World Netball Championships	15th
2007 World Netball Championships	14th
2015 Netball World Cup	12th
2019 Netball World Cup	11th
2023 Netball World Cup	10th

==== Commonwealth Games ====
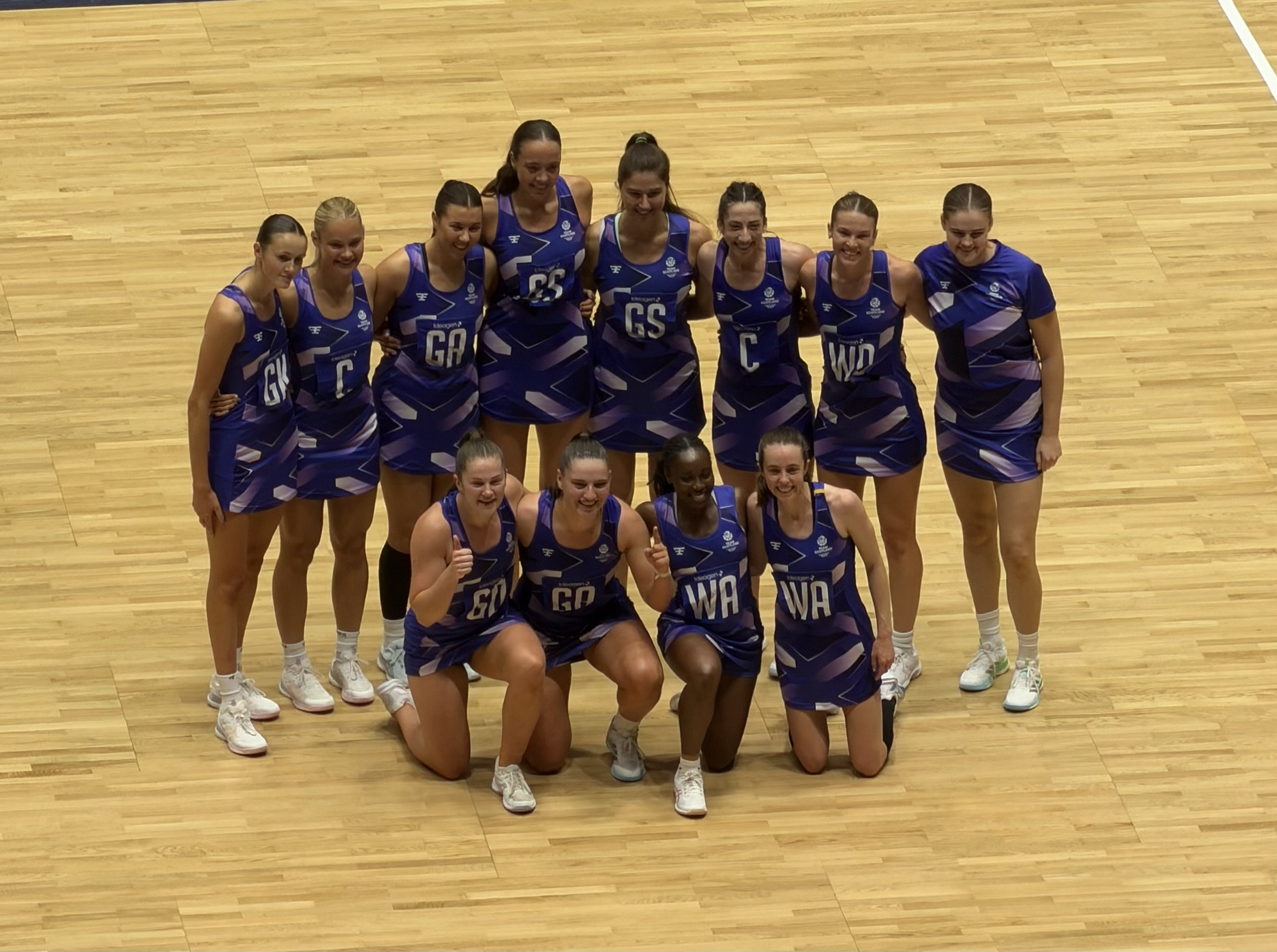
Scotland at the 2026 Commonwealth Games

Scotland have been regular participants in Netball at the Commonwealth Games. They hosted the tournament in 2014 and 2026. In 2026 they achieved their highest ever Commonwealth Games placing, finishing 8th.

Tournaments	Place
2014 Commonwealth Games	9th
2018 Commonwealth Games	9th
2022 Commonwealth Games	9th
2026 Commonwealth Games	8th

==== World Games ====
Tournaments	Place
1985 World Games	5th/6th
1989 World Games	5th

=== European tournaments ===
==== Netball Europe Open Championships ====
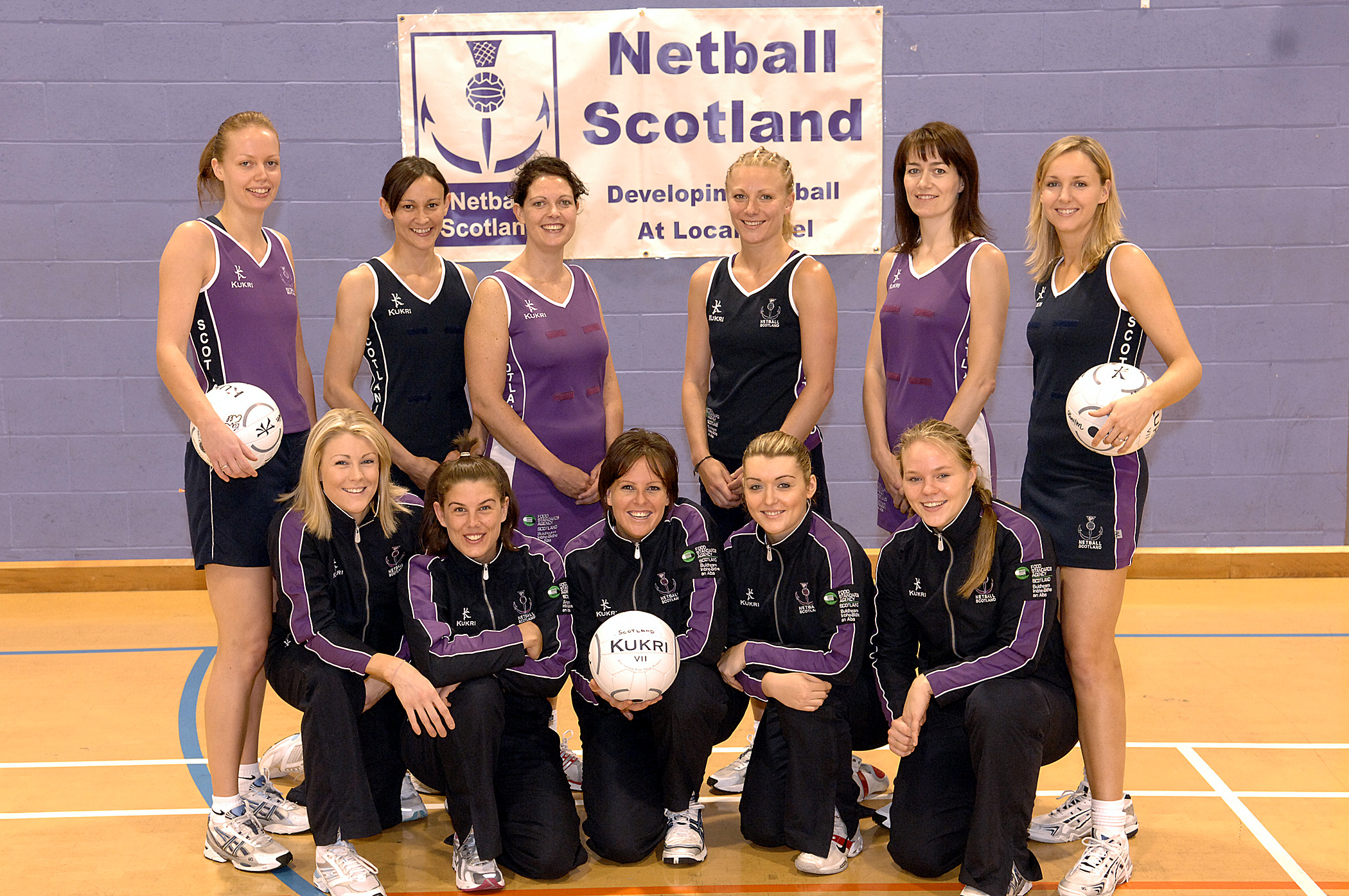
2006 Scotland national netball team

Scotland played regularly in the Netball Europe Open Championships. Their best performances came in 2014 and when they finished second.

Tournaments	Place
1998 FENA Open	
1999 FENA Open	
2000 FENA Open	
2001 FENA Open	
2002 FENA Open	
2003 FENA Open	
2004 FENA Open	
2005 FENA Open	
2006 FENA Open	
2007 FENA Open	3rd
2008 FENA Open	2nd
2009 Netball Europe Open Championships	2nd
2010 Netball Europe Open Championships	3rd
2011 Netball Europe Open Championships	4th
2012 Netball Europe Open Championships	4th
2013 Netball Europe Open Championships	4th
2014 Netball Europe Open Championships	2nd place, silver medalist(s)
2015 Netball Europe Open Championships	6th
2016 Netball Europe Open Championships	3rd
2017 Netball Europe Open Championships	3rd

==== Netball World Cup Qualifiers ====
Tournaments	Place
2007 World Netball Championships Qualifier – Europe	2nd
2011 World Netball Championships Qualifier – Europe	3rd
2014 Netball Europe Open Championships	2nd
2019 Netball World Cup Regional Qualifier – Europe	1st
2023 Netball World Cup Regional Qualifier – Europe	2nd

=== Invitational tournaments ===
==== Celtic Cup ====
The Celtic Cup series is hosted and organised by Netball Northern Ireland, Netball Scotland and Wales Netball. The series features Northern Ireland, Scotland and Wales playing a series of test matches against each other and visiting national teams.

Tournaments	Place
2024 Celtic Cup	2nd
2025 Celtic Cup	2nd

==== Netball South Africa Diamond Challenge ====
Tournaments	Place
2022 SPAR Diamond Challenge	2nd

==== Netball Singapore Nations Cup ====
Scotland have finished as runners up in two Netball Singapore Nations Cup tournaments.

Tournaments	Place
2006 Netball Singapore Nations Cup	3rd place, bronze medalist(s)
2009 Netball Singapore Nations Cup	2nd place, silver medalist(s)
2010 Netball Singapore Nations Cup	2nd place, silver medalist(s)

== Notable players ==
=== Current Squad ===
The current squad was selected for the 2025 Scotland New Zealand netball series.

Scotland roster
Players
Coaches

Name	Pos	DOB	Height	Club	Nat	Caps
Emma Barrie	GS, GK	13 April 2002 (aged 23)	1.94 m (6 ft 4 in)	Birmingham Panthers	(England)	40
Cerys Cairns	GA, GS	1 November 2002 (aged 22)	1.80 m (5 ft 11 in)	London Mavericks	(England)	18
Iona Christian (cc)	WA, C	22 December 1997 (aged 27)	1.67 m (5 ft 6 in)	Nottingham Forest	(England)	30
Rachel Conway	GK, GD		1.84 m (6 ft 0 in)	Glasgow University	(Scotland)	30
Cerys Finn	GK, GD		1.84 m (6 ft 0 in)	London Mavericks	(England)	23
Bethan Goodwin	GS, GA	4 July 1999 (aged 26)	1.85 m (6 ft 1 in)			49
Hannah Grant	GD, WD		1.78 m (5 ft 10 in)	Hawks	(Australia)	22
Hannah Leighton	C, WD	1 August 1998 (aged 27)	1.76 m (5 ft 9 in)	Nottingham Forest	(England)	31
Emma Love	WA, GA	26 July 1999 (aged 26)	1.74 m (5 ft 9 in)	Glasgow Saltires	(Scotland)	23
Niamh McCall	GA, GS, WA	28 April 2000 (aged 25)	1.79 m (5 ft 10 in)	Cardiff Dragons	(England)	49
Jazmine Moore	WA, C		1.63 m (5 ft 4 in)	Glasgow University	(Scotland)	4
Emily Nicholl (cc)	GD, WD, GK	24 May 1994 (aged 31)	1.80 m (5 ft 11 in)	Panthers	(Australia)	58
Evie Watts	GA, WA, GS		1.78 m (5 ft 10 in)	London Pulse	(England)	7

Head coach

- Kath Tetley

Assistant coach

- Lesley MacDonald

Manager: Karen McElveen
Performance Analyst:
Simon Lovelock

Notes

- (c) – Captain
- (cc) – Co-captain
- (vc) – Vice-captain
- – Injury / maternity leave
- (TRP) – Temporary Replacement Player

=== Captains ===
Captains	Years
Rita Rice (née Renfrew)	1949
Lily Keith (Hunter)	
Theresa Rice (McCartney)	
Margaret Devine	
Lena Fraser (Calder)	
Sheila Donald (Ferguson)	
Celia Shields (Breslin)	1957
Ann Boyle (Gillespie)	
Mae Lavery (Rooney)	1963
Moira Ord MBE	1967
Priscilla Kerr	
Marie Fairie	1971, 1975, 1979
Liz Wilson (McPheely)	
Janie Elliot (Lavery)	
Susan Mosher (McCafferty)	1987
Alexandra (Sandra) Frame (Trainer)	1991
Mary Tough	1999
Lindsay Cummings	2003
Lesley Macdonald	2007
Hayley Mulheron	2015
Claire Maxwell	201x–2023
Emily Nicholl	
Iona Christian	

== Head coaches ==
Coach	Years
Catherine Sweeney	1949
Elizabeth Kelly	1962
Muriel Getty	1963
Katie Pie	1967
Lena Fraser	1971, 1975
Maeve Wilson	1976
Lena Fraser	1977
Moira Ord	1979
Elizabeth Church	1980
Marie Fairie	1980–1982
Agnes O'Brien	1983, 1987
Anne Clark	1991
Anne Marie Daly	1995
Mary Ann Cosgrove	1999
Anne Clark	2003, 2007
Mary Tough	2008
Denise Holland	2008–2012
Jill Fullerton	2013
Gail Parata	2013–2019
Tamsin Greenway	2020–2023
Kath Tetley	2024–

== Honours ==
- Netball World Cup Qualifiers
  - Winners: 2019
  - Runner up: 2007, 2015, 2023
- Netball Europe Open Championships
  - Runner up: 2014
- Netball Singapore Nations Cup
  - Runner up: 2009, 2010
- Netball South Africa Diamond Challenge
  - Runner up: 2022
