= Netball Super League =

Netball Super League may refer to:

- Netball Super League (Singapore), the highest league in Singaporean netball
- Netball Super League (Malaysia), the highest league in Malaysian netball
- Netball Super League (United Kingdom), the highest league in British netball
- Mobil Superleague, the highest league in Australian netball from 1985 to 1996

== See also ==
- Suncorp Super Netball or Super Netball League, the current highest league in Australian netball
