= Emily Nicholl =

Scotland netball international

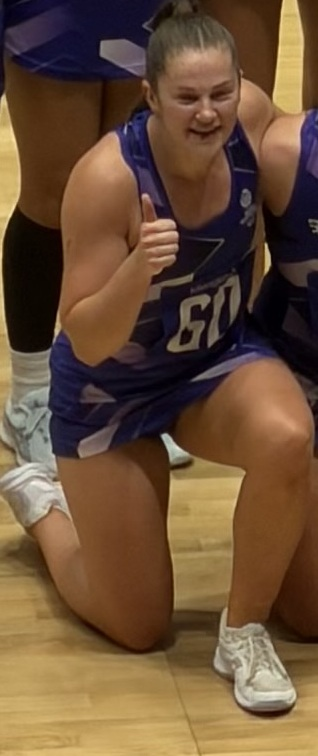

Personal information
- Full name: Emily Nicholl
- Born: 24 May 1994 (age 32) Edinburgh, Scotland
- Occupation: Solicitor
- Height: 1.79 m (5 ft 10 in)
- School: Biggar High School
- University: University of Edinburgh

Netball career
- Playing positions: GA, GS, WA
Years	Club team	Apps
2017–2024	Sirens	
2025	Panthers	
Years	National team	Caps
2016–	Scotland	50+

Emily Nicholl (born 24 May 1994) is a Scotland netball international. She represented Scotland at the 2018 and 2022 Commonwealth Games and at 2019 and 2023 Netball World Cups. Between 2017 and 2024, she played for Sirens in the Netball Super League. She has captained both Scotland and Sirens.

== Early life, education and employment ==
Nicholl is originally from Biggar, South Lanarkshire. Between 2006 and 2012, she attended Biggar High School. She captained her school team when they won the 2012 South Lanarkshire Schools Senior Netball League. She also represented her school in orienteering competitions. Between 2012 and 2017, she attended the University of Edinburgh where she gained a Bachelor of Laws and a Diploma in Professional Legal Practice. Since 2020 she has worked as a solicitor for Pinsent Masons.

== Playing career ==
=== Sirens ===
Between 2017 and 2024, Nicholl played for Sirens in the Netball Super League. She was a member of the inaugural Sirens team. She captained Sirens during their final 2024 season.

=== Panthers ===
In 2025, Nicholl played for Panthers in the Netball NSW Premier League.

=== Scotland ===
Nicholl made her senior debut for Scotland at the 2016 Netball Europe Open Championships. In January 2018, she was a member of the Scotland team that won a 2019 Netball World Cup Regional Qualifier. She subsequently represented Scotland at the 2018 Commonwealth Games, the 2019 Netball World Cup, and then the 2022 Commonwealth Games. She was vice captain of the Scotland team that finished second to South Africa in the 2022 SPAR Diamond Challenge. In November/December 2022, Nicholl spent three weeks training with West Coast Fever. This was part of a program aimed at giving Scotland players the opportunity to train in a high performance environment. She was also vice captain of the Scotland team at the 2023 Netball World Cup. Together with Iona Christian she co-captained Scotland at the 2024 Celtic Cup. On 17 February 2025, Nicholl made her 50th senior appearance for Scotland during a match against Papua New Guinea at the 2025 Pacific Netball Series. She was also named the MVP for the same tournament.

Tournaments	Place
2016 Netball Europe Open Championships	3rd
2017 Netball Europe Open Championships	3rd
2019 Netball World Cup Regional Qualifier – Europe	1st
2018 Commonwealth Games	9th
2019 Netball World Cup	11th
2022 Commonwealth Games	9th
2023 Netball World Cup Regional Qualifier – Europe	2nd
2022 SPAR Diamond Challenge	2nd
2023 Netball World Cup	10th
2024 Celtic Cup	2nd
2025 Pacific Netball Series	2nd
2025 Scotland New Zealand netball series	2nd
2025 Celtic Cup	2nd
