= 1949 England Scotland Wales netball series =

First international netball series hosted by England

Tournament details
- Host country: England
- City: London
- Venue(s): GEC Ground, Wembley
- Dates: 7 May 1949
- Teams: 3

Final positions
- Champions: England
- Runners-up: Wales
- Third place: Scotland

Tournament statistics
- Matches played: 3

The 1949 England Scotland Wales netball series was organised by the All England Netball Association. The series featured three netball test matches played on 7 May 1949. It saw England, Scotland and Wales all play their debut netball test matches. The three netball matches were played outdoors at the General Electric Company ground on Preston Road in Wembley, London. England won both of their matches by the same score, 25–3, and won the series. The Wales v Scotland match was much more closely fought. Scotland, after a poor start were 6–0 down but then established a 10–9 lead. Wales however fought back and pipped Scotland to win 14–13.

== Squads ==
Participating teams and rosters
England	Scotland	Wales
Elizabeth Rodger (Hertfordshire); Mary Thomas (Lincolnshire East); Anne Greasley (Bedfordshire East); O. De Lacey (Lancashire); B. Parfitt (Middlesex); Mary French (Surrey); E Owen (c) (Lancashire); Reserves: E. Needham (Midlands); B. Cooper; E Salter	Rita Rice (née Renfrew) (c) (Glasgow); Rena Johnson (Glasgow); Helen Glen (Edinburgh); Lily Keith (née Hunter) (Aberdeen); Helen M. McLeish (née Fleming) (Dunfermline); Mary Noel Milne (née Brebner) (Aberdeen); Doris Breen (née Fitzpatrick) (Glasgow); Reserves: Eileen (Binkie) MacLean (Glasgow); Beth Robertson (née Smith) (Dunfermline)	B Williams (Flint/N Wales); Marjorie Whitley (Flint/N Wales); A. Shorey (Caernarfonshire); E. Travis (Caernarfonshire); Iris Fine (Cardiff); Sybil Nest Butler-Jones (c) (Cardiff); Pat Meaden (Swansea); Reserves: J. Sweeting (Cardiff); M. Pritchard (Caernarfonshire)
Head Coach:	Coaches/Selectors ?: Stella McGuire, Catherine Sweeney	Head Coach:

== Umpires ==
Umpire	Association
R. M. Harris	England
A. M. Ward	England
I. Calder	Scotland
M. Williams Jones	Wales

== Matches ==
Saturday, 7 May 1949	England	25–3	Scotland
14.15

Saturday, 7 May 1949	Wales	14–13	Scotland
15.20

Saturday, 7 May 1949	England	25–3	Wales
16.25

== Final table ==
Pos	Team	P	W	D	L	GF	GA	GD	Pts
1	England	2	2	0	0	50	6	+44	4
2	Wales	2	1	0	1	17	38	-21	2
4	Scotland	2	0	0	2	16	39	-23	0
