= Birmingham Panthers (netball) =

Netball Super League team in Birmingham

- Full name: Birmingham Panthers
- Association: England Netball
- Founded: 2024
- Based in: Birmingham
- Region: West Midlands
- Home venues: Arena Birmingham bp pulse LIVE; Coventry Skydome; University of Worcester Arena
- Head coach: Sonia Mkoloma
- Asst coach: Rachel Dunn
- Captain: Gabby Marshall
- League: Netball Superleague
- Website: www.birminghampanthers.com
Home	Away

Birmingham Panthers is an English netball team based in Birmingham which plays in the Netball Superleague. The franchise was added in 2025 as one of two new entries in the relaunched “NSL 2.0”, which aims to professionalise the league.

The Birmingham Panthers' original debut netball kit was designed by Fashion Design students Rohan Scott and Zoe Bennett at Birmingham City University. The design was inspired by a combination of local architecture translated into stylistic shapes curves and hidden elements such as an iridescent pattern that resembled the rosettes often unseen on a panther's shiny black coat. Scott and Bennett collaborated to combine their concepts to create the striking electric blue debut kit for the Birmingham Panthers.

== History ==
The franchise was announced in 2024, alongside Nottingham Forest netball, as a new team for the relaunched Netball Superleague. Severn Stars, based in Worcester, which had been a member of the league since 2017 was disbanded the same year with Jo Trip the former Stars coach announced as Panthers head coach.

In 2025 Knighthead Capital Management, a US asset management firm, which owns Birmingham City F.C. announced its investment in the team.

== Home venues ==
Panthers home venues for 2025 are the BP Pulse Live Arena; Utilita Arena Birmingham; Coventry Skydome and University of Worcester Arena.

== Notable players ==
2026 Birmingham Panthers roster
Players
Coaching staff

Nat.	Name	Position(s)	DoB	Height
(Australia)	Gabrielle Coffey	GD, GK	24 May 2000	1.86 m (6 ft 1 in)
(Wales)	Betsy Creak (vc)	GS	10 August 1996	1.88 m (6 ft 2 in)
(England)	Ruth Hughes	WA, C	8 May 2001	1.65 m (5 ft 5 in)
(Northern Ireland)	Michelle Magee	GD, WD	13 January 2000	1.80 m (5 ft 11 in)
(England)	Kira Rothwell	GA, WA	29 October 2000	1.78 m (5 ft 10 in)
(New Zealand)	Tiana Metuarau	GA, GS	15 January 2001	1.83 m (6 ft 0 in)
(Australia)	Charli Fidler	GD, GK	28 July 2003	1.87 m (6 ft 2 in)
(England)	Alanna Pullen	GA,WA	27 October 2005	–
(England)	Tami Fapohunda	GK		–
(England)	Izzy Kaye	C,WD		–

Head coach

- Sonia Mkoloma

Assistant coach

- Rachel Dunn

Notes

- (c) – Captain
- (cc) – Co-captain
- (vc) – Vice-captain
- – Injury / maternity leave
- (TRP) – Temporary Replacement Player
Player profiles: Team website
Last updated: 2 January 2026

== Head coaches ==
Coach	Years
(New Zealand) Jo Trip	2024–2025
(England) Sonia Mkoloma	2025–present

Director of Netball	Years
(Jamaica) Connie Francis	2024–Present
