= Shadia Nassanga =

Ugandan netball and basketball player

Shadiah Nassanga
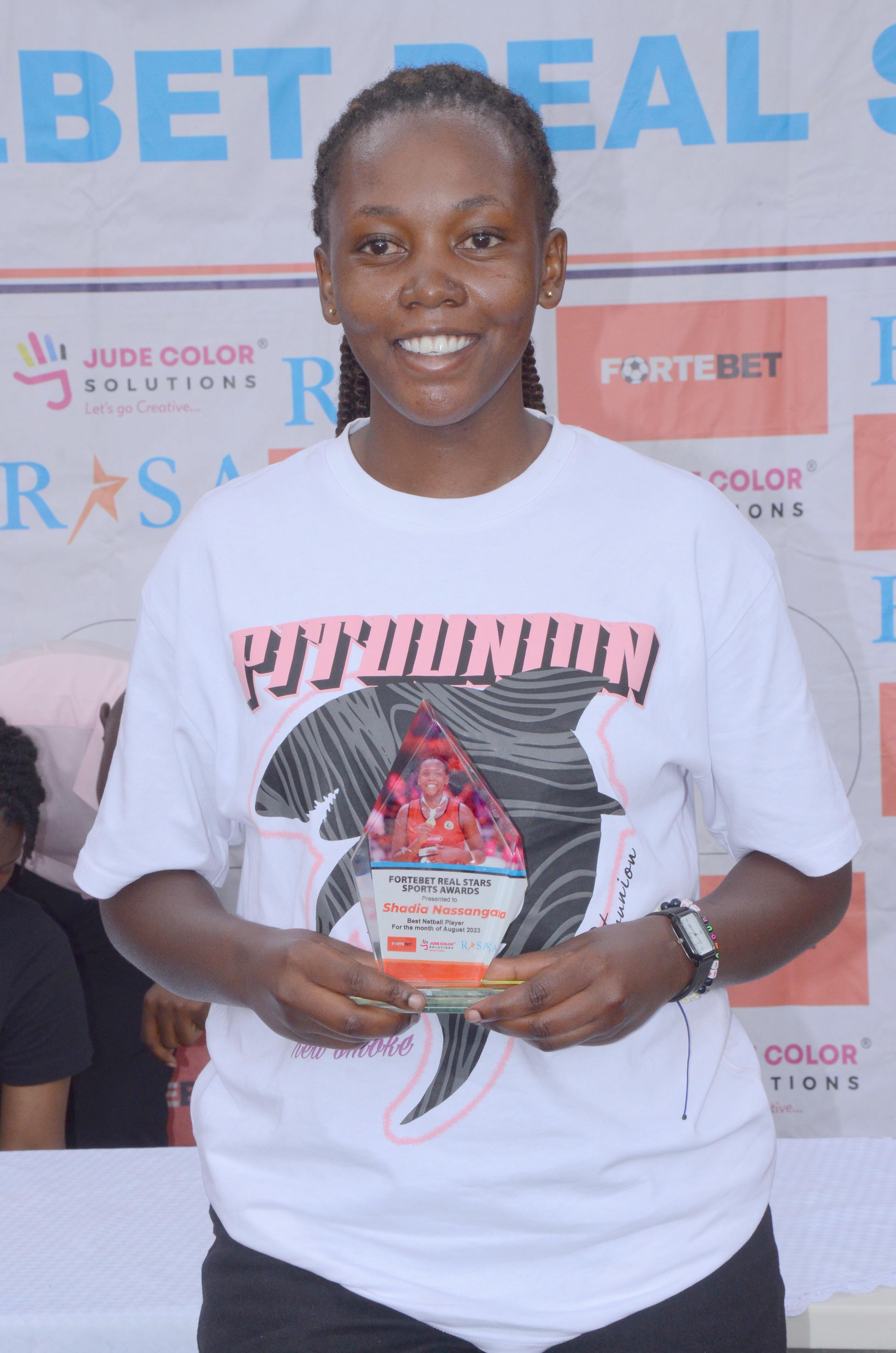

Personal information
- Born: September 9, 2000 (age 25) Namungoona, Kampala, Uganda
- Occupation: Netball player Basketball player
- School: St Mary's Kitende SS
- University: Victoria University

Netball career
- Playing position: Shooter
| Years | Club team | Apps |
| Years | National team | Caps |

Shadia Nassanga also known as Miimah (born in September, 9, 2000) is a Ugandan netball player and later basketball player, who played as a shooter for Kampala Capital City Authority Netball Club, JKL Lady Dolphins in Uganda, KL Wildcats based in Malaysia and the Uganda National Netball Team (She Cranes).

She captained the She Cranes in the 2015 Netball World Cup held in Sydney Australia. She won the 2023 Top shooter Award in the Malaysian Netball Super League, playing for KL Wildcats, where she scored 386 goals on 91% shooting, won the Best Shooter at the Zonal Championship Games in 2014 in Wakiso, and also helped her school (Exodus College) to win a triple silver-medal haul at the National Netball Novice Championships (2015, 2016 and 2017). She won the Best Shooter's accolade at the 2017 National Netball Rally Championships that were held at Blessed Sacrament SS Kimanya, won several trophies with St Mary's Kitende (National Rally, Zonal Championship, East Africa Games).

== Early life and education ==
Shadia Nassanga is the second last born in the family of five girls where three of them are netballers, including her elder sister, Hajjarah Ssegujja a defender at Prison Netball Club. She was born in Namungoona, Kampala, Uganda by the Late Ssegujja Yahaya and Ms. Nakirunda Janet Kalule.

She lost her father when she was only seven years old, and it was her netball talent that helped her keep in school.

She went to Kiddawalime Primary School in Namungoona, Kisubi for her primary level which she finished in 2013, joined Exodus College Wakiso in 2014 for her O-level and then St Mary's Kitende where she acquired her UACE certificate in 2019, doing History, Entrepreneurship, Luganda and ICT. She later pursued a degree in Business Administration at Victoria University.

== Netball career ==
Nassanga was introduced to netball after seating for her P.L.E exams as she played for her village club called Namungoona Spurs Netball Club. She then continued her career at Exodus College Wakiso school netball team while in senior two.

In 2018, she joined St Mary's Kitende, however in 2016 KCCA NC spotted her while still at Exodus. KCCA waited for her to finish secondary level and they took her to play for their team.

In 2023, following their amazing performance in the Netball World Cup 2023 in Cape Town South Africa, Nassanga together with other three She Cranes players ( Faridah Kadondi, Shaffie Nalwanja and Christine Namulumba joined the Malaysian Netball Super League when they signed their professional contract with KL Wildcats.

Her team( KL Wildcats) were the tournament champions and Shadiah Nassanga led the scoring charts with 386 goals.

== Basketball career ==
Nassanga started her basketball career when she returned home(Uganda) from the Malaysian Netball Super League as she joined JKL Lady Dolphins. This was to explore other options in another sport, and also to keep her fitness such that Netball finds her in a good shape when it returns to serious action.

== Awards and nominations ==
On Thursday, August 3, 2023, Shadia was awarded Player of The Match in the Netball World Cup 2023 in Cape Town as they played against South Africa. She also picked up more two MVP awards making a total of three awards in the whole tournament.

Shadiah also won the Top shooter Award in the Malaysian Netball Super League, playing for KL Wildcats, where she scored 386 goals on 91% shooting.
