= Celtic Cup (netball) =

International netball tournament

- Most recent season or competition: 2025 Celtic Cup
- Sport: Netball
- First season: 2024
- Owners: Netball Northern Ireland; Netball Scotland; Wales Netball
- Most recent champion: Uganda
- Most titles: Uganda; Wales (1 title each)
- Broadcasters: BBC iPlayer/BBC Sport; NetballPass

The Celtic Cup is an international netball series hosted and organised by Netball Northern Ireland, Netball Scotland and Wales Netball. The series features Northern Ireland, Scotland and Wales playing a series of test matches against each other and visiting national teams. Wales won the inaugural 2024 series.

== Series ==
Series	Winners	Runners up	3rd	4th	5th	6th
2024	Wales	Scotland	Zimbabwe	Northern Ireland		
2025	Uganda	Scotland	Wales	Zimbabwe	Namibia	Northern Ireland
