= Mary French (netball) =

English netball player, coach, umpire and administrator

Personal information
- Full name: Mary Patricia French (née Bushell)
- Born: 13 February 1926
- Died: 15 January 2016 (aged 89)
- School: Mary Datchelor School
- University: Dartford College of Physical Education

Netball career
- Playing positions: GK, GD
Years	Club team	Apps
1945–19xx	Surrey County	
Years	National team	Caps
1949–1957	England	
Coaching career
- Years: Team
- 1967–1975: England
- 1983: Northern Ireland
- 1984–1986: Wales

Mary French (13 February 1926 – 15 January 2016) was an England netball international, coach, umpire and administrator. As a player she represented England at the 1949 England Scotland Wales Netball Series and captained England during the 1956 away series against South Africa. Between 1967 and 1975, she served as England head coach, including at the 1967, 1971 and 1975 World Netball Tournament. Between 1984 and 1986, she served as Wales head coach. Between 1963 and 2015, French attended 13 different World Netball Championships either as a coach, volunteer or spectator.

== Early life, education and family ==
French was born Mary Patricia Bushell on 13 February 1926 and grew up in Brockley, South London. She initially attended Mary Datchelor School. Between 1943 and 1946 she attended Dartford College of Physical Education. She began teaching at Purley County School and later moved on to teach mathematics at Croydon High School. In 1957, she married Philip French, a bank inspector, and they had two daughters, Jaqi and Nicky. Both of her daughters attended Croydon High School while she was a teacher there. Philip French died in 1985.

== Playing career ==
=== Early years ===
As a schoolgirl, French helped pioneer netball in Wales. Mary Datchelor School, including French, was evacuated to Llanelli for the duration of World War II. One of French's PE teachers, Marion Morton, helped form a small committee to organise netball matches, some of which featured French. This committee later became the Welsh Netball Association. In 1945 she began representing Surrey County as a goalkeeper.

=== England ===
Between 1949 and 1957, French played for England. She played as a goal defender for England as they made their Test debut during the 1949 England Scotland Wales Netball Series. She later captained England during the 1956 away series against South Africa.

== Coaching career ==
=== England ===
Between 1967 and 1975, French served as head coach of England, including at the 1967, 1971 and 1975 World Netball Tournaments. In 1975, she guided England to second place.

Tournaments	Place
1967 World Netball Tournament	4th
1971 World Netball Tournament	3rd
1975 World Netball Tournament	2nd

=== Wales ===
Between 1984 and 1986, French served as Wales head coach.

== Legacy ==
=== Mary French Award ===
The Mary French Award for Lifetime Services to Netball recognizes those who have given exceptional service to Wales Netball. The award was instigated in 1989 by French herself. In August 2024, the outgoing Wales Netball Chair, Catherine Lewis, was honored with the award.

== Honours ==
Individual Awards

Year	Award
2001	England Netball's Hall of Fame
2010	Europe Netball Service Award
2011	England Netball Honorary Life Membership Award
2015	INF Service Award
