= Sonia Mkoloma =

England international netball player (born 1979)

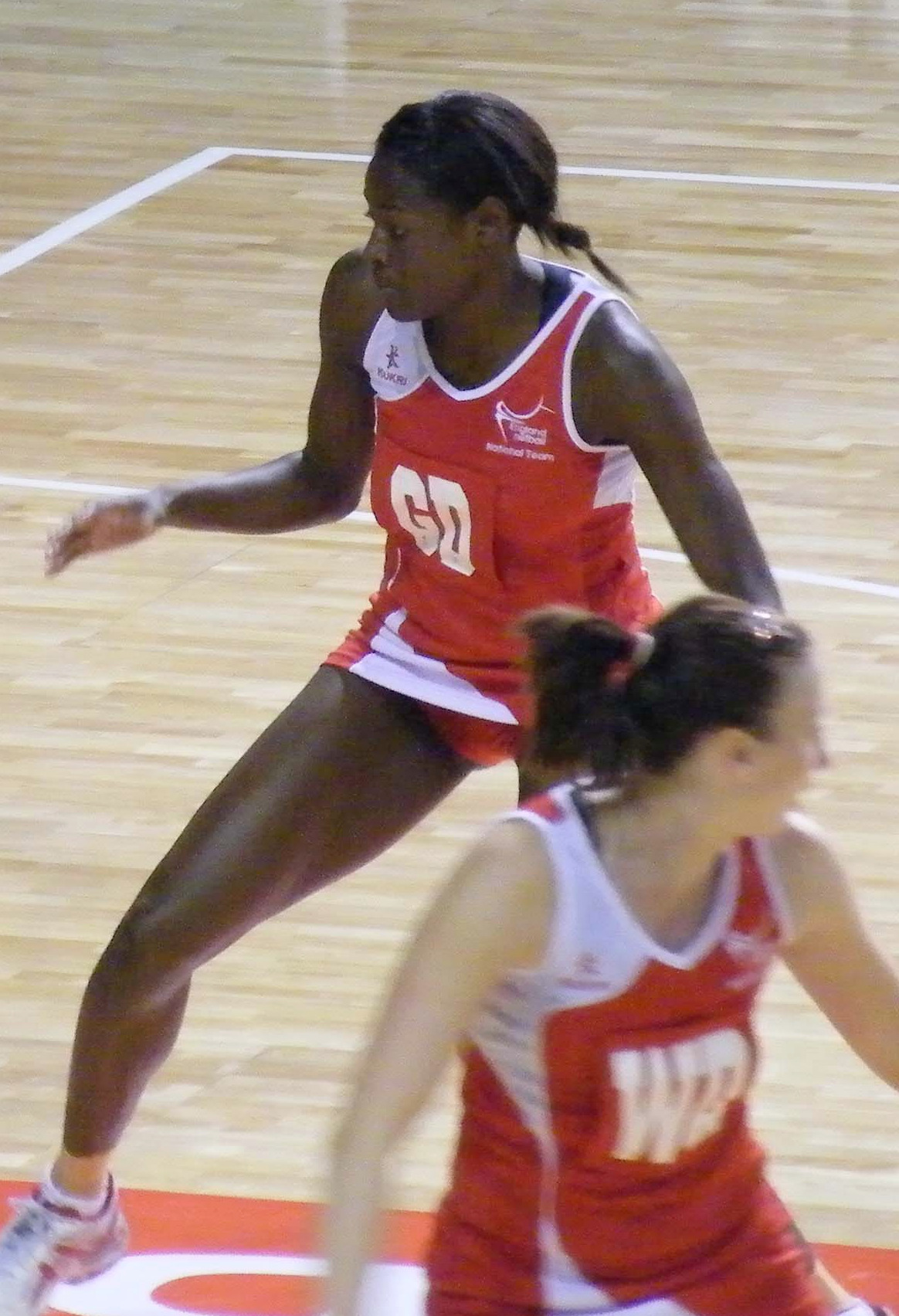
- Mkoloma in 2008

Personal information
- Born: 17 January 1979 (age 47) London, England
- Height: 1.84 m (6 ft 0 in)

Netball career
- Playing positions: GD, GK
Years	Club team	Apps
2005–07	Surrey Storm	
2008	Central Pulse	13
2009	Canterbury Tactix	13
2010–14	New South Wales Swifts	69
Years	National team	Caps
1999–2015	England	123
Coaching career
- Years: Team
- 2021–2024: England Netball (Ass)
- 2024–2025: England Netball Pathway
- 2025–present: Birningham Panthers
Medal record
Representing England
Netball World Championships
Bronze medal – third place	1999 Christchurch	Netball
Bronze medal – third place	2011 Singapore	Netball
Bronze medal – third place	2015 Sydney	Netball
Commonwealth Games
Bronze medal – third place	2006 Melbourne	Netball
Bronze medal – third place	2010 Delhi	Netball
World Netball Series
Silver medal – second place	2010 Liverpool	Fastnet
- Updated on 13 December 2010

Sonia Mkoloma (born 17 January 1979) is an English former international netball player and the current head coach of Birmingham Panthers. She competed at three Netball World Championships, three Commonwealth Games and two World Netball Series.

== Club career ==
=== Netball Super League ===
Between 2005 and 2007 Mkoloma played with Surrey Storm (formerly Brunel Hurricanes) in the Netball Super League with fellow England defender Geva Mentor.

=== ANZ Championship ===
Mkoloma moved to the ANZ Championship and played for Central Pulse in the 2008 season and for Canterbury Tactix in the 2009 season. In 2010, she transferred to the New South Wales Swifts. On 11 April 2011, Mkoloma played her 50th ANZ Championship match between the Swifts and the Magic. At the end of the 2014 ANZ season, she retired from netball with 69 appearances and five seasons at the Swift and 95 ANZ caps.

== International career ==
Mkoloma made her international debut for the English national team in 1999. She earned 123 caps and represented England at five Netball World Cups, winning bronze medals in 1999, 2011 and 2015 and three Commonwealth Games, winning bronze medals in 2006 and 2010.

In August 2009, Mkoloma played for a World 7 team, coached by Julie Fitzgerald, that defeated New Zealand 2–1 in the 2009 Taini Jamison Trophy Series.

== Coaching career ==
Mkoloma became England Roses Assistant Coach in June 2021, and was part of the team behind the historic silver medal at the 2023 Netball World Cup. In March 2024 she became England Roses Pathway Head Coach. She was announced as the head coach for Netball Super League side Birmingham Panthers in 2025.

== Media work ==
Sonia is an Assistant Referee on the revival of the game show Gladiators, alongside Assistant Referee Lee Phillips and Lead Referee Mark Clattenburg.

== Honours ==
=== England ===
- Netball World Cup: Bronze: 999, 2011, 2015
- Commonwealth Games: Bronze: 2006, 2010
- 2013 England Netball Hall of Fame Inductee

=== New South Wales Swifts ===
- 2013 NSW Swifts Players' Player Award

=== Central Pulse ===
- 2008 joint-ANZ Championship Most Valuable Player
