= Sharleen Makusha =

Zimbabwean netball player

Personal information
- Born: 28 December 1997 (age 28)
- Occupation: netball player
- Height: 1.70 m (5 ft 7 in)

Netball career
- Playing position: goal keeper
Years	Club team	Apps
- Platinum Queens

Sharleen Makusha (born 28 December 1997) is a Zimbabwean netball player who represents Zimbabwe internationally and plays in the position of goal keeper.

== Early life ==
Makusha was born in 1997 and her first interest was soccer. However her skills and height attracted the attention of netball coach Simbarashe Mlambo. Makusha won her parents support for her new interest when she won a scholarship to Pamushana Mission school in Masvingo where she repeated two years of schooling and developed her netball skills.

== Career ==
In 2018, she was included in the national under 21 team to attend the World Cup in Botswana.

In 2018, she was playing for the Platinum Queens in Zvishavane with fellow national team player Progress Moyo. Makusha was chosen together with other ex under 21 players Claris Kwaramba and Sharon Bwanali to be part of the 2019 Netball World Cup team. Her height created some discussion when she was a member of the Zimbabwean squad which finished at eighth position during the 2019 Netball World Cup, which was historically Zimbabwe's first ever appearance at a Netball World Cup tournament.

She was included in the Zimbabwean Gems squad for the 2019 African Netball Championships.
