= Michelle Magee =

Gaelic footballer and netball player

Personal information
- Full name: Michelle Magee
- Born: 13 January 2000 (age 26) County Antrim, Northern Ireland
- Height: 5 ft 11 in (1.80 m)
- Relative: Emma Magee (sister)
- School: St. Dominic's Grammar School
- University: Loughborough University

Netball career
- Playing positions: GD, WD, GK
| Years | Club team | Apps |
| c. 2017 | Westside | |
| 2018– | Kingsway | |
| 2018– | → Charnwood Rutland Warriors | |
| 2018–19 | → Loughborough Lightning | |
| 2020– | → Leeds Rhinos Netball | |
| Years | National team | Caps |
| 201x– | Northern Ireland | |

Michelle Magee (born 13 January 2000) is a Northern Ireland netball international and an Antrim ladies' Gaelic footballer. She was a member of the Northern Ireland teams at the 2018 Commonwealth Games and the 2019 Netball World Cup. Her older sister, Emma Magee, is also a Northern Ireland netball international and an Antrim ladies' Gaelic footballer.

== Early life, family and education ==
Magee was educated at St. Dominic's Grammar School where she played both ladies' Gaelic football and netball. She was still a student at St Dominic's when she represented Northern Ireland at the 2018 Commonwealth Games. Her older sister, Emma Magee, is also a Northern Ireland netball international and an Antrim ladies' Gaelic footballer. Their father, Jim Magee, is an assistant manager/coach with the senior Antrim ladies' Gaelic football team. Since 2018, Magee has attended Loughborough University.

== Netball ==
=== Clubs ===
At club level Magee has played for Westside and Kingsway in Northern Ireland. While attending Loughborough University, Magee has played for Charnwood Rutland Warriors and Loughborough Lightning.

=== Northern Ireland ===
Magee represented Northern Ireland at under-17 and under-21 levels. She captained the under-17 team and was a member of the under-21 squad at the 2017 Netball World Youth Cup. She was also a member of the senior Northern Ireland teams at the 2018 Commonwealth Games and the 2019 Netball World Cup. Magee and her sister, Emma, belong to a group of senior Ladies' Gaelic footballers who also play netball for Northern Ireland. Others include Michelle Drayne (Antrim), Neamh Woods (Tyrone) and Caroline O'Hanlon (Armagh).

| Tournaments | Place |
|---|---|
| 2017 Netball World Youth Cup | 16th |
| 2017 Netball Europe Open Championships | 2nd |
| 2019 Netball World Cup Regional Qualifier – Europe | 2nd |
| 2018 Commonwealth Games | 8th |
| 2019 Netball World Cup | 10th |
| 2019 Netball Europe Open Championships | 3rd place, bronze medalist(s) |
| 2023 Netball World Cup Regional Qualifier – Europe | 3rd |
| 2024 Celtic Cup | 4th |
| 2025 Celtic Cup | 6th |

== Gaelic games ==
Michelle Magee
Sport
- Sport: Ladies' Gaelic football Camogie
- Position: Midfielder
Clubs
- Years: Club
- St Brigids; Carryduff
Inter-county
- Years: County
- 201x–: Antrim

=== Clubs ===
Magee has played ladies' Gaelic football at club level for St Brigids and Carryduff. In 2017 Michelle and Emma Magee were both members of the Carryduff team that won the Down Ladies' Senior Football Championship.

=== Inter-county ===
Michelle and Emma Magee have also represented Antrim in competitions such as the Ladies' National Football League and All-Ireland Junior Ladies' Football Championship. Michelle Magee also played camogie at under-14 level for Antrim.
