= Netball Scotland National League =

The National League is a netball league in Scotland.

The league was founded at the start of the 2022/2023 season, by Netball Scotland. It has a single division, containing the seven top netball clubs in Scotland. The establishment of the league was intended to help Scottish players prepare for the 2023 Netball World Cup.

The founding clubs were:

- Bellahouston Netball Club
- Dunedin Netball Club
- Edinburgh Accies Netball Club
- Edinburgh University Netball Club
- Glasgow Saltires Netball Club
- Glasgow University Netball Club
- Strathclyde University Netball Club

For the 2022/2023 season, the Highland Fever men's netball team was also invited to compete in what is otherwise a women's league.
