= Claris Kwaramba =

Zimbabwean netball player (born 1999)

Personal information
- Born: 9 October 1999 (age 25)
- Height: 1.60 m (5 ft 3 in)
- Occupation: netball player

Netball career
- Playing position(s): goal defense, wing defense

Claris Kwaramba (born 9 October 1999) is a Zimbabwean netball player who represents Zimbabwe internationally and plays in the positions of goal defense and wing defense. She was a member of the Zimbabwean senior squad after she was chosen together with other ex under 21 players Sharleen Makusha and Sharon Bwanali to be part of the 2019 Netball World Cup team. which finished at eighth position during the 2019 Netball World Cup, which was historically Zimbabwe's first ever appearance at a Netball World Cup tournament.
