= Netball Super League (Malaysia) =

Malaysian professional sports league

- Sport: Netball
- Founded: 2020
- First season: 2021
- No. of teams: 8
- Country: Malaysia

The Netball Super League, often referred as NSL, is a professional netball league based in Malaysia. It was established by the Malaysian Netball Association and Astro Group’s subsidiary, Astro Arena, to develop and grow the sport in Malaysia. The first season commenced on 19 March 2021 at the Juara Stadium. The KL Wildcats were the inaugural champions, beating the Johor Jewels in the Grand Final.

== History ==
Netball became a popular women's sport in Malaysia around the turn of the century following the nation's success of hosting the first-ever netball competition as a medal event at the Commonwealth Games in 1998 and the Southeast Asian (SEA) Games in 2001. On the back of two consecutive gold medal performances at the SEA Games in 2017 and 2019, the Malaysian Netball Association decided to form the NSL in 2020, which was later delayed to 2021 due to the COVID-19 pandemic and a movement control order imposed by the Malaysian government.

== Competition format ==
The NSL uses standard International Netball Federation (INF) rules and regulations.

For the 2021 season, teams are separated into two groups and play each other twice (a double round-robin system) for six games, in which three points are awarded for a win, one for a draw and zero for a loss. The top two of each group advance to a single-elimination knockout phase, with the winners progressing to the Grand Final and the two defeated teams contesting a third-placed play-off.

== Champions ==
Season	Champions	Runners-up	Third place	Fourth place
2021	(Kuala Lumpur) KL Wildcats	Johor Jewels	Selangor Angels	Perak Phoenix
2022	Johor Jewels	(Kuala Lumpur) KL Wildcats	Selangor Angels	Pahang Tulips
2023	Johor Jewels	(Kuala Lumpur) KL Wildcats	Perak Phoenix	Putrajaya Dynamites
2025	(Kuala Lumpur) KL Wildcats	Putrajaya Dynamites	Johor Jewels	Perak Phoenix
2026	Terengganu Marvels	Johor Jewels	(Kuala Lumpur) KL Wildcats	Kedah Sunshine

=== Individual awards ===
Season	Most Valuable Player	Best Shooter	Best Attacker	Best Defender	Best Young Player	Best Import Player
2021	Pow Mei Foong (Johor)	An Najwa Azizan (Selangor)	Nurfariha Abdul Razak (Johor)	Nur Syafazliyana Mohd Ali (Kuala Lumpur)	Pavitra Devi a/p Balakrishnan (Perak)	Not awarded
2022	Nordiyanah Noor Sabadinee (Kuala Lumpur)	Siti Maisarah Affandi (Pahang)	Nurfariha Abdul Razak (Johor)	Gayani Samanthika Kumari Dissanayake (Johor)	Pavitrah a/p Sathiaseelan (Kuala Lumpur)	Not awarded
2023	Nassanga Shadiah (Kuala Lumpur)	Christine Kango (Perak)	Amisya Khairud Din (Putrajaya)	Nalwanja Shaffie (Kuala Lumpur)	J. Leisharaani (Kuala Lumpur)	Not awarded
2025	J. Leisharaani (Kuala Lumpur)	Maisarah Affandi (Putrajaya)	J. Leisharaani (Kuala Lumpur)	Nur Syafazliyana Mohd Ali (Johor)	Not awarded	Nassanga Shadiah (Kuala Lumpur)
2026	Nurfariha Abdul Razak (Johor)	Maisarah Affandi (Terengganu)	Siti Aminah Ahmad (Kuala Lumpur)	Adalia Jasmine Mustazal (Terengganu)	Not awarded	Laura Langman (Johor)

== Clubs ==
=== 2026 season ===
Team	Main Colour	Head Coach	Manager	Captain
Johor Jewels	Blue	Fazira Mesnan	Juanita Primrose A/P Mariyam Pillai	Noor Azilah Aziz
Kedah Sunshine	Orange	Huslina Hussain	Rosmawati Abdul Majid	Noor Maslydia Mashhor
KL Wildcats	Purple	Norizan Rajab	Yusnizar Fuad	Nur Syafazliyana Ali
Melaka Mystique	Green	Noorrul Afniza Ahmad Jamaludin	Rodziana Abdul Aziz	Siti Wahidah Abdul Hamid
Terengganu Marvels				
Pahang Tulips	Black	Hapizah Jaafar	Eszaitulaila Jaafar Sidek	Siti Maisarah Affandi
Perak Phoenix	Yellow	Almastara Hasim	Paridah Abdul Karim	Khairunnisa Nazri
Selangor Angels	Red	Rosnani Ismail	Azlin Kamsah	An Najwa Azizan

== Notable players ==
Australia

- Gretel Bueta

New Zealand

- Laura Langman

South Africa

- Sigrid Burger
- Jeanté Strydom

Uganda

- Faridah Kadondi
- Christine Nakitto
- Shadia Nassanga
