= Ursula Ndlovu =

Zimbabwean netball player (born 1994)

Personal information
- Born: 3 February 1994 (age 31)
- Occupation: netball player
- Height: 1.60 m (5 ft 3 in)

Netball career
- Playing position: goal attack

Ursula Ndlovu (born 3 February 1994) is a Zimbabwean netball player who represents Zimbabwe internationally and plays in the position of goal attack. She was a member of the Zimbabwean squad which finished at eighth position during the 2019 Netball World Cup, which was historically Zimbabwe's first ever appearance at a Netball World Cup tournament.
