= Faridah Kadondi =

Ugandan netball player

Personal information
- Full name: Faridah Kadondi
- Nationality: Ugandan
- Born: November 9, 1998 (age 27) Butaleja District, Uganda

Netball career
- Playing position: Goal Keeper (GK) / Goal Defence (GD)
Years	Club team	Apps
2024–2025	Nottingham Forest Netball	7
Years	National team	Caps
- Updated on July 2025

Faridah Kadondi (born 9 November 1998) is a Ugandan netball player who plays with the Uganda national netball team and plays in the goalkeeper and defender position.

== Education background ==
Faridah started school at Butaleja Bugosa primary school. She later joined Kibuli SS for her ordinary level studies. There after, she went to Luyanzi College SS in Bweyogerere on a scholarship.

== Early career ==
Faridah was among the She Cranes squad that went to South Africa for the 2023 Netball World Cup and helped Uganda finish in the fifth position.

During the 2022 Fast5 Netball World Series where she represented Uganda, Faridah earned the Player of the Match award in Uganda’s game against Australia. She helped on Uganda’s 46-42 win over South Africa in the bronze-medal match.

She was formerly a player at a Makindye based club known as Weyonje Netball Club. She also played basketball for KCCA Leopards in Uganda’s National Basketball League.She started playing netball at Butaleja Bugosa primary school back while in P.5.

== International career ==
Faridah's international experience started during the 2022 Fast5 World Series. She joined Nottingham Forest Netball from Uganda’s Weyonje Netball Club as a goal defense in September 2024. Upon joining this new club she travelled to Malaysia for professional assessments in the Malaysia's Netball Super League.

In July 2025 Faridah departed from Nottingham Forest Netball after spending 10 months with the club.
