= Sharon Bwanali =

Zimbabwean netball player (born 1997)

Personal information
- Born: 6 April 1997 (age 28)
- Occupation: netball player
- Height: 1.71 m (5 ft 7 1/2 in)

Netball career
- Playing position: goal attack

Sharon Bwanali (6 April 1997) is a Zimbabwean netball player who represents Zimbabwe internationally and plays in the position of goal attack. She was chosen together with other ex under 21 players Claris Kwaramba and Sharleen Makusha to be part of the 2019 Netball World Cup team. The Zimbabwean squad finished at eighth during the 2019 Netball World Cup, which was historically Zimbabwe's first ever appearance at a Netball World Cup tournament.
