= Emma Magee =

Gaelic footballer and netball player

Personal information
- Full name: Emma Magee
- Born: 11 November 1997 (age 28) County Antrim, Northern Ireland
- Height: 5 ft 9 in (1.75 m)
- Relative: Michelle Magee (sister)
- School: St. Dominic's Grammar School
- University: Northumbria University

Netball career
- Playing positions: WA, GA, GS
Years	Club team	Apps
201x–	Westside	
Years	National team	Caps
201x–	Northern Ireland	

Emma Magee (born 11 November 1997) is a Northern Ireland netball international and an Antrim ladies' Gaelic footballer. She was a member of the Northern Ireland team at the 2019 Netball World Cup. Her younger sister, Michelle Magee, is also a Northern Ireland netball international and an Antrim ladies' Gaelic footballer.

== Early life, family and education ==
Magee was educated at St. Dominic's Grammar School where she played ladies' Gaelic football for the school team. Her younger sister, Michelle Magee, is also a Northern Ireland netball international and an Antrim ladies' Gaelic footballer. Their father, Jim Magee, is an assistant manager/coach with the senior Antrim ladies' Gaelic football team. Between 2016 and 2019, Magee attended Northumbria University where she gained a first class honours BA in Psychology with Sport and Exercise Science.

== Netball ==
=== Clubs ===
At club level Magee has played for Westside in Northern Ireland.

=== Northern Ireland ===
Magee captained the Northern Ireland under-21 team at the 2017 Netball World Youth Cup. She was also a member of the senior Northern Ireland team at the 2019 Netball World Cup. Magee and her sister, Michelle, belong to a group of senior Ladies' Gaelic footballers who also play netball for Northern Ireland. Others include Michelle Drayne (Antrim), Neamh Woods (Tyrone) and Caroline O'Hanlon (Armagh).

Tournaments	Place
2017 Netball World Youth Cup	16th
2019 Netball World Cup	10th
2019 Netball Europe Open Championships	3rd place, bronze medalist(s)
2024 Celtic Cup	4th
2025 Celtic Cup	6th

== Gaelic games ==
Michelle Magee
Sport
- Sport: Ladies' Gaelic football
- Position: Forward
Clubs
- Years: Club
- St Brigids; Carryduff
Inter-county
- Years: County
- 201x–: Antrim

=== Clubs ===
Magee has played ladies' Gaelic football at club level for St Brigids and Carryduff. In 2017 Emma and Michelle Magee were both members of the Carryduff team that won the Down Ladies' Senior Football Championship.

=== Inter-county ===
Emma and Michelle Magee have also represented Antrim in competitions such as the Ladies' National Football League and All-Ireland Junior Ladies' Football Championship. In 2019 Emma was a member of the Antrim team that won the Ulster Junior Ladies' Football Championship.
