= Emma Barrie =

Scottish netball player (born 2002)

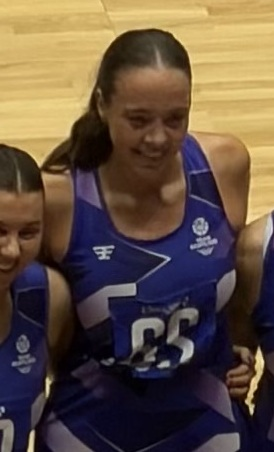

Personal information
- Born: 13 April 2002 (age 24)
- Height: 1.95 m (6 ft 5 in)

Netball career
- Playing position: GS
Years	Club team	Apps
x—2023	Strathclyde Sirens	
2024	Team Bath	
2025—present	Birmingham Panthers NXT Gen	
Years	National team	Caps
2019—present	Scotland	

Emma Barrie (born 13 April 2002) is a Scottish netball player who plays Birmingham Panthers NXT Gen and the Scottish national team. She competed at the 2022 and 2026 Commonwealth Games.

== Early life and education ==
Barrie was born on 13 April 2002 and grew up in Stonehouse, South Lanarkshire.

== Club career ==
During Round 11 of the 2025 Suncorp Super Netball season, Barrie was named on the bench for the Sunshine Coast Lightning replacing the injured Cara Koenen; however, she did not take to the court.

== International career ==
Barrie made her senior international debut for Scotland during the 2019 Netball World Cup. She was the youngest player to play at the tournament. Barrie was named in the squad for the 2022 Commonwealth Games.
