= Bethan Goodwin =

Scottish netball player (born 1999)

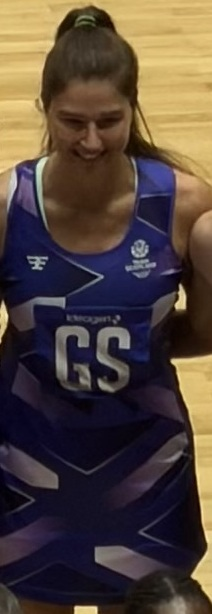
- Bethan Goodwin at the 2026 Commonwealth Games

Personal information
- Born: 4 July 1999 (age 27) Glasgow, Scotland
- Home town: Glasgow, Scotland

Sport
- Country: Scotland
- Sport: Netball
- Club: Strathclyde Sirens
- Coached by: Lesley MacDonald

Bethan Goodwin (born 4 July 1999) is a Scottish netball player. She was selected to represent the Scotland netball team at the 2019 Netball World Cup.
