= England Netball =

Governing body of netball in England

- Sport: Netball
- Jurisdiction: England
- Abbreviation: EN
- Founded: 1926; 100 years ago
- Affiliation: World Netball; Netball Europe
- Headquarters: Loughborough
- President: Joan Mills MBE
- Chairman: Baroness Sue Campbell
- CEO: Fran Connolly
- Coach: Jess Thirlby
- Sponsor: Vitality; Nike

Official website
- www.englandnetball.co.uk

England Netball, formerly the "All England Netball Association", is the national governing body which oversees, promotes and manages netball in England. It is responsible for the strategic plan of the sport across the country and is a not for profit customer-focused sport business.

== Overview ==
England Netball is responsible for the management of the England national netball team, nicknamed The Vitality Roses, the professional Netball Super League and the Netball Premier League. It also oversees a number of programs running from junior to development level such as Walking Netball, Back to Netball, Bee Netball and the Future Roses National Academy for aspiring athletes under the age of 20.

As of July 2025, England Netball has 122,000 affiliated members and more than 180,000 women and girls play the sport every week.

== Competitions and Leagues ==
England Netball organises the following competitions and leagues:

- Netball Super League
- Netball Premier League
- NXT Gen League
- Netball Performance League
- U16 & U14 National Clubs Competition
- U19, U16 & U14 National Schools Competition

== Hall of Fame ==
The following England netball internationals have been inducted into England Netball's Hall of Fame.

Inducted	Player	Appearances	Years
2001	Mary Thomas		1949
2001	Kendra Slawinski	128	1983–1995
2001	Mary French		1949–1957
2005	Anne Stephenson		1960s
2007	Colette Thomson	89	1975–198x
2008	Amanda Newton	100	1996–2008
2009	Karen Atkinson	100	1997–2011
2013	Sonia Mkoloma	123	1999–2015
2014	Jade Clarke	208	2003–
2015	Pamela Cookey	114	2004–2015
2015	Geva Mentor	175	2001–2023
2018	Olivia Murphy	95	1997–2006
2018	Tracey Neville	81	1996–2008
2018	Ama Agbeze		2001–
2020	Eboni Usoro-Brown	116	2008–2022
2020	Joanne Harten	117	2007–2023
2020	Maggie Jackson		1984–1987

The following coaches, administrators and umpires have been inducted into England Netball's Hall of Fame.

Inducted	Inductee	Roll
2001	Mary Beardwood	former England head coach
2001	Mary Bulloch	
2001	Annette Cairncross	
2001	Rose Harris	
2001	Joyce Haynes	
2001	Jean Perkins	
2001	Sheelagh Redpath	
2001	Rena Stratford	former England head coach
2001	Pat Taylor	
2002	Jean Bourne	
2002	Margaret Cassidy	
2002	Frances Tomkins	
2003	Betty Galsworthy	former England head coach
2003	Joyce Wheeler	former England head coach
2004	Heather Crouch	former England head coach
2005	Pam Orton	
2005	Gordon Padley	
2008	Janet Wrighton	
2010	Liz Broomhead	former England head coach
2012	Anna Mayes	former England head coach
2013	Sheila Perks	
2014	Cheryl Danson	
2014	Joan Mills	
2016	Gary Burgess	Umpire
