= Niamh McCall =

Scottish netball player (born 2000)

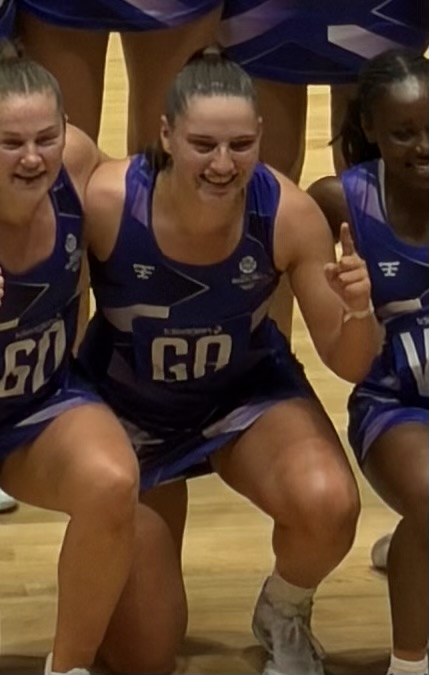
- McCall at the 2026 Commonwealth Games

Personal information
- Full name: Niamh McCall
- Born: 28 April 2000 (age 26) Strathaven, Scotland
- Height: 179 cm (5 ft 10 1/2 in)
- University: University of Strathclyde

Netball career
- Playing position: GA
Years	Club team	Apps
2018—2024	Strathclyde Sirens	
2024	Loughborough Lightning	
2025	Loughborough Lightning Nxt Gen	
2026—present	Cardiff Dragons	
Years	National team	Caps
2016—present	Scotland	

Niamh McCall (born 28 April 2000) is a Scottish netball player who plays for Cardiff Dragons in the Netball Super League and the Scotland netball team. She was selected to represent Scotland at the 2019 Netball World Cup and the 2018, 2022 and 2026 Commonwealth Games.

== Early life and education ==
McCall grew up in Strathaven. She attended the University of Strathclyde and graduated with a BEng in Sports Design Engineering in 2022.

== Club career ==
=== Strathclyde Sirens ===
McCall started her career in 2018 at Strathclyde Sirens in the Netball Super League.

=== Loughborough Lightning ===
After 5 seasons and 62 caps with Sirens McCall joined Loughborough Lightning for the 2024 season. Following the announcement of Super League 2.0 McCall was moved to Lightnings NXT Gen squad for the 2025 season. In April 2025 McCall announced she had suffered a season ending injury after rupturing her ATFL at the PacAus series. Lightning NXT Gen finished the 2025 season as Champions.

=== Cardiff Dragons ===
McCall joined Cardiff Dragons for the 2026 season. She helped Dragons finish 5th in the league, their highest placing since 2014. McCall was named MVP and players player for the season.

== International career ==
McCall became the first player born in the 2000s to represent the Scottish Thistles when she debuted against Northern Ireland at the 2016 Celtic Clash. She was also part of the World Youth Cup team that took 8th place in Botswana in 2017.

She represented Scotland at the 2018 Commonwealth Games as the youngest member of the team. McCall returned for a second Games at Birmingham 2022 and a third home games at Glasgow 2026, where she helped Scotland achieve their highest ever finish at a Commonwealth Games, placing 8th.
