= List of Commonwealth Games medallists in netball =

The following is a list of medal winners at the Commonwealth Games netball tournament.

== Commonwealth Games medallists ==
=== 1998 ===
Gold	Silver	Bronze
Australia; Coach: Jill McIntosh	New Zealand; Coach: Yvonne Willering	England; Coach: Mary Beardwood
Carissa Tombs; Liz Ellis; Jenny Borlase; Janine Ilitch; Kathryn Harby; Nicole Cusack; Rebecca Sanders; Simone McKinnis; Shelley O'Donnell; Sarah Sutter; Sharelle McMahon; Vicki Wilson (c)	Anna Rowberry; Belinda Blair; Belinda Colling (c); Bernice Mene; Donna Loffhagen; Joanne Steed; Julie Dawson; Lesley Nicol; Linda Vagana; Lorna Suafoa; Noeline Taurua; Sonya Hardcastle	Amanda Newton; Fiona Murtagh (c); Hellen Manufor; Joanne Zinzan; Karen Aspinall; Lisa Stanley; Lorraine Law; Lucia Sdao (vc); Lyn Carpenter; Naomi Siddall; Olivia Murphy; Tracey Neville

=== 2002 ===
Gold	Silver	Bronze
Australia; Coach: Jill McIntosh	New Zealand; Coach: Ruth Aitken	Jamaica; Coach: Maureen Hall
Alexandra Hodge; Alison Broadbent; Catherine Cox; Liz Ellis; Eloise Southby; Jacqui Delaney; Janine Ilitch; Kathryn Harby-Williams (c); Nicole Richardson; Peta Squire; Rebecca Sanders; Sharelle McMahon	Anna Rowberry; Anna Veronese; Belinda Colling; Daneka Wipiiti; Donna Loffhagen; Irene van Dyk; Jenny-May Coffin; Julie Seymour (c); Lesley Nicol; Linda Vagana; Sheryl Clarke; Vilimaina Davu	Elaine Davis; Georgia Gordon; Kaydia Kentish; Nadine Ffrench; Nadine Bryan; Nichala Gibson; Oberon Pitterson (c); Sharmalee Watkins; Sharon Wiles; Simone Forbes; Tasha Morgan; Tiffannie Wolfe

=== 2006 ===
Gold	Silver	Bronze
New Zealand; Coach: Ruth Aitken	Australia; Coach: Norma Plummer	England; Coach: Margaret Caldow
Leana de Bruin; Belinda Colling; Vilimaina Davu; Temepara George; Laura Langman; Jessica Tuki; Anna Rowberry; Anna Scarlett; Maria Tutaia; Irene van Dyk; Casey Williams; Adine Wilson (c)	Megan Dehn; Natalie Avellino; Alison Broadbent; Bianca Chatfield; Catherine Cox (vc); Susan Fuhrmann; Selina Gilsenan; Janine Ilitch; Sharelle McMahon (c); Susan Pratley; Jessica Shynn; Natalie von Bertouch	Ama Agbeze; Karen Atkinson; Louisa Brownfield; Jade Clarke; Pamela Cookey; Rachel Dunn; Chioma Ezeogu; Geva Mentor; Sonia Mkoloma; Olivia Murphy (c); Naomi Stenhouse; Abby Teare

=== 2010 ===
Gold	Silver	Bronze
New Zealand; Coach: Ruth Aitken	Australia; Coach: Norma Plummer	England; Coach: Maggie Jackson
Liana Leota; Leana de Bruin; Temepara George; Katrina Grant; Joline Henry; Laura Langman; Grace Rasmussen; Anna Scarlett; Maria Tutaia; Irene van Dyk; Casey Williams; Daneka Wipiiti	Rebecca Bulley; Catherine Cox; Laura Geitz; Susan Fuhrmann; Mo'onia Gerrard; Kimberlee Green; Renae Hallinan; Sharelle McMahon; Natalie Medhurst; Lauren Nourse; Susan Pratley; Natalie von Bertouch	Karen Atkinson; Sara Bayman; Eboni Beckford-Chambers; Louisa Brownfield; Jade Clarke; Pamela Cookey; Rachel Dunn; Stacey Francis; Tamsin Greenway; Joanne Harten; Geva Mentor; Sonia Mkoloma

=== 2014 ===
Gold	Silver	Bronze
Australia; Coach: Lisa Alexander	New Zealand; Coach: Wai Taumaunu	Jamaica; Coach: Minneth Reynolds
Caitlin Thwaites; Caitlin Bassett; Madison Robinson; Tegan Caldwell; Bianca Chatfield; Laura Geitz; Julie Corletto; Kimberlee Green; Renae Hallinan; Sharni Layton; Natalie Medhurst; Kim Ravaillion	Liana Leota; Jodi Brown; Leana de Bruin; Shannon Francois; Katrina Grant; Ellen Halpenny; Anna Harrison; Joline Henry; Casey Kopua; Laura Langman; Cathrine Latu; Maria Tutaia	Romelda Aiken; Nicole Aiken-Pinnock (c); Shanice Beckford; Stacian Facey; Jhaniele Reid; Thristina Harwood; Sasher-Gaye Henry; Malysha Kelly; Khadijah Williams; Paula Thompson; Vangelee Williams; Kasey Evering

=== 2018 ===
Gold	Silver	Bronze
England; Coach: Tracey Neville	Australia; Coach: Lisa Alexander	Jamaica; Coach: Sasher-Gaye Henry
Ama Agbeze (c); Eboni Beckford-Chambers; Jade Clarke; Beth Cobden; Kadeen Corbin; Jodie Gibson; Serena Guthrie; Joanne Harten; Natalie Haythornthwaite; Helen Housby; Geva Mentor; Chelsea Pitman	Caitlin Bassett (c); April Brandley; Courtney Bruce; Laura Geitz; Susan Pettitt; Kim Ravaillion; Madison Robinson; Gabi Simpson; Caitlin Thwaites; Elizabeth Watson; Jo Weston; Stephanie Wood	Romelda Aiken; Shanice Beckford; Nicole Dixon; Stacian Facey; Jhaniele Fowler-Reid (c); Rebekah Robinson; Shamera Sterling; Adean Thomas; Paula Thompson; Jodi-Ann Ward; Khadijah Williams; Vangelee Williams

=== 2022 ===
Gold	Silver	Bronze
Australia; Coach: Stacey Marinkovich	Jamaica; Coach: Connie Francis	New Zealand; Coach: Noeline Taurua
Liz Watson (c); Sunday Aryang; Gretel Bueta; Courtney Bruce; Ashleigh Brazill; Paige Hadley; Sarah Klau; Cara Koenen; Kate Moloney; Kiera Austin; Jo Weston; Stephanie Wood	Jhaniele Fowler-Reid (c); Shanice Beckford; Kadie-Ann Dehaney; Nicole Dixon-Rochester; Shadian Hemmings; Shimona Nelson; Rebekah Robinson; Shamera Sterling; Adean Thomas; Jodi-Ann Ward; Khadijah Williams; Latanya Wilson	Gina Crampton (c); Sulu Fitzpatrick; Kate Heffernan; Kayla Johnson; Kelly Jury; Phoenix Karaka; Bailey Mes; Grace Nweke; Shannon Saunders; Te Paea Selby-Rickit; Whitney Souness; Maia Wilson

=== 2026 ===
Gold	Silver	Bronze
New Zealand; Coach: Noeline Taurua	Jamaica; Coach: Sasha-Gaye Henry-Wright	Australia; Coach: Stacey Marinkovich
Karin Burger (c); Maddy Gordon; Catherine Hall; Georgia Heffernan; Kate Heffernan (vc); Kelly Jackson; Grace Nweke; Kimiora Poi; Mila Reuelu-Buchanan; Martina Salmon; Carys Styhe; Amelia Walmsley	Shamera Sterling-Humphrey (c); Romelda Aiken; Shanice Beckford (vc); Kadie-Ann Dehaney; Rhea Dixon; Nicole Dixon-Rochester; Brie Grierson; Crystal Plummer; Abigale Sutherland; Jodi-Ann Ward; Azara Wilmot; Latanya Wilson (vc)	Liz Watson (c); Kiera Austin; Courtney Bruce; Sophie Dwyer; Sophie Garbin; Matilda Garrett; Georgie Horjus; Sarah Klau; Cara Koenen; Kate Moloney (vc); Jamie-Lee Price; Jo Weston

== Source ==
- Results Database from the Commonwealth Games Federation
