= List of Jamaica international netball players =

Jamaica netball internationals

The following is a list of notable Jamaica netball international players who have represented the national team in international tournaments such as the Netball World Cup, the Netball at the Commonwealth Games, the Netball at the World Games, the Taini Jamison Trophy, the Fast5 Netball World Series and in other senior test matches.

== First Jamaica national netball team ==
The Jamaica Netball Association was formed in 1959. It subsequently became affiliated to the West Indies Netball Board and was invited to send a team to the West Indies Netball Championship in Montserrat in August 1959. The first Jamaica national netball team made their Test debut at this tournament. The squad featured the players listed below.

Player	Years
Grace Beckford-Benjamin	
Marie Beckford-Miller	
Monica Brown-Mendes	
Barbara Buckley-Jones	1959–196x
Hermione Edmonds-Whittaker	
Valerie Fleming-Webster	
Ouida Golding-Beecher	
Joy Grant-Charles	
Fay Mills	
Dorothea Morris	

== Captains ==
Captains	Years
Barbara Buckley-Jones	1959, 1963
Avis Collins	1967
Vilma McDonald	1971
Sonia Nissen	1975
Brenda Khouri	1979, 1983
Janet Johnson	1987, 1991
Jill Patterson	1988
Marva Lindsay	1993
Connie Francis	1995, 1999
Oberon Pitterson	2002, 2003
Elaine Davis	2006–2007
Simone Forbes	2007–2011
Nadine Bryan	2009–2013
Romelda Aiken	2013–2014
Malysha Kelly	2013–2016
Nicole Aiken-Pinnock	2014–2015
Althea Byfield	2016
Jhaniele Fowler	2017–
Shimona Nelson	2022
Adean Thomas	2023

== Most-capped internationals ==
Player	Appearances	Years
Nadine Bryan	159	1996–2014
Oberon Pitterson	120+	1988–2006
Connie Francis	120+	1985–2003
Georgia Gordon	110	1994–2010
Simone Forbes	102	2000–2011
Jhaniele Fowler	99+	2010–
Elaine Davis	91	1995–2007
Romelda Aiken	86	2005–
Nicole Aiken-Pinnock	82	2005–2018
Kasey Evering	81	2002–2014
Nichala Gibson	79	2000–2009
Sasher-Gaye Henry	75	1996–2015

== Netball World Cup ==
Jamaica have competed at every World Netball Championships and/or Netball World Cup since the inaugural 1963 tournament. They have been bronze medalists on four occasions – 1991, 2003, 2007 and 2023. Jamaica have also hosted the 1971 and 2003 World Netball Championships.

=== Bronze medallists ===
1991 World Netball Championships	2003 World Netball Championships	2007 World Netball Championships	2023 Netball World Cup
Charmaine Aldridge; Valerie Blake; Karen Clarke; Connie Francis; Janet Francis; Karlene Hamilton; Janet Johnson (c); Marva Lindsay; Patricia McDonald; Marjorie Patterson; Oberon Pitterson; Sharon Taylor	Nadine Bryan; Althea Byfield; Elaine Davis (vc); Kasey Evering; Simone Forbes; Connie Francis; Nichala Gibson; Georgia Gordon; Oberon Pitterson (c); Sharon Wiles; Carla Williams; Tiffany Wolfe	Elaine Davis (c); Nicole Aiken; Romelda Aiken; Nadine Bryan; Althea Byfield; Kasey Evering; Simone Forbes; Nichala Gibson; Sasher-Gaye Henry; Christina Solmon; Paula Thompson; Sharon Wiles	Romelda Aiken-George; Shanice Beckford; Kadie-Ann Dehaney; Nicole Dixon-Rochester; Jhaniele Fowler; Crystal Plummer; Rebekah Robinson; Shamera Sterling; Adean Thomas; Jodi-Ann Ward; Khadijah Williams; Latanya Wilson
Head Coach: Maureen Hall	Head Coach: Maureen Hall	Head Coach: Connie Francis	Head Coach: Connie Francis

== Commonwealth Games ==
=== Bronze medallists ===
Jamaica have competed at every netball tournament at the Commonwealth Games. They were bronze medallists in 2002, 2014 and 2018.

2002 Commonwealth Games	2014 Commonwealth Games	2018 Commonwealth Games^{1}
Elaine Davis; Georgia Gordon; Kaydia Kentish; Nadine Ffrench; Nadine Bryan; Nichala Gibson; Oberon Pitterson (c); Sharmalee Watkins; Sharon Wiles; Simone Forbes; Tasha Morgan; Tiffannie Wolfe	Romelda Aiken; Nicole Aiken-Pinnock (c); Shanice Beckford; Stacian Facey; Jhaniele Reid; Thristina Harwood; Sasher-Gaye Henry; Malysha Kelly; Khadijah Williams; Paula Thompson; Vangelee Williams; Kasey Evering	Romelda Aiken; Shanice Beckford; Nicole Dixon; Stacian Facey; Jhaniele Fowler-Reid (c); Rebekah Robinson; Shamera Sterling; Adean Thomas; Paula Thompson; Jodi-Ann Ward; Khadijah Williams; Vangelee Williams
Head Coach: Maureen Hall	Head Coach: Minneth Reynolds	Co-Head Coach: Sasher-Gaye Henry
Assistant coach:	Assistant coach:	Co-Head Coach: Marvette Anderson

Notes

- ^1 The 2018 Commonwealth Games squad also won the 2018 Taini Jamison Trophy Series.

=== Silver medallists ===
At the 2022 Commonwealth Games, with a team coached by Connie Francis and captained by Jhaniele Fowler, Jamaica finished as silver medallists. Jamaica defeated Australia 57–55 during the pool stages and topped the pool. In the semi-finals they defeated New Zealand 67–51 and, as a result, qualified for their first major final. However, in the final, they lost 55–51 to Australia.

2022 Commonwealth Games roster
Players
Coaches

Name	Pos	DOB	Height	Club	Nat	Caps
Jhaniele Fowler (c)	GS	21 July 1989 (aged 33)	1.98 m (6 ft 6 in)	West Coast Fever	(Australia)
Shimona Nelson	GS	1 December 1998 (aged 23)	1.95 m (6 ft 5 in)	Melbourne Mavericks	(Australia)
Shanice Beckford	GA, WA	16 April 1995 (aged 27)	1.70 m (5 ft 7 in)	West Coast Fever	(Australia)
Rebekah Robinson	GA	23 January 1995 (aged 27)	1.78 m (5 ft 10 in)		(Jamaica)
Khadijah Williams	WA, C	29 December 1994 (aged 27)	1.68 m (5 ft 6 in)		(Jamaica)
Nicole Dixon-Rochester	C, WA	3 February 1995 (aged 27)	1.65 m (5 ft 5 in)		(Jamaica)
Adean Thomas	C, WA, WD	31 July 1994 (aged 27)	1.73 m (5 ft 8 in)		(Jamaica)
Shadian Hemmings	WD, C, WA	9 November 1990 (aged 31)	–		(Jamaica)
Jodi-Ann Ward	WD, GD	1 September 1994 (aged 27)	1.78 m (5 ft 10 in)	Giants Netball	(Australia)
Latanya Wilson	GD, WD	10 November 2000 (aged 21)	1.88 m (6 ft 2 in)	Adelaide Thunderbirds	(Australia)
Shamera Sterling	GK, GD	21 October 1995 (aged 26)	1.85 m (6 ft 1 in)	Adelaide Thunderbirds	(Australia)
Kadie-Ann Dehaney	GK, GD	4 September 1996 (aged 25)	1.92 m (6 ft 4 in)	West Coast Fever	(Australia)

Head coach

- Connie Francis

Assistant coach

- Shawn Murdock
  Specialist Coach:
  Rob Wright

Notes

- (c) – Captain
- (cc) – Co-captain
- (vc) – Vice-captain
- – Injury / maternity leave
- (TRP) – Temporary Replacement Player

== World Games ==
=== Bronze medallists ===
1985 World Games	1993 World Games
Avadne Anglin; Valerie Balke; Pauline Burton; Janet Guy; Janet Johnson; Brenda Khouri; Marva Lindsay; Patricia McDonald; Joan Oldacre; Karlene Roese; Sharon Taylor	Charmaine Aldridge; Angeline Campbell; Karen Clarke; Connie Francis; Ann-Marie Grant; Karlene Hamilton; Marva Lindsay (c); Jennifer McDonald; Patricia McDonald; Oberon Pitterson; Natalie Tucker; Andrea Watson
Head Coach:	Head Coach: Maureen Hall

== Netball and Basketball ==
The following Jamaica netball internationals also played for the Jamaica women's national basketball team.

Player	Netball Apps	Years	Basketball Apps	Years
Althea Byfield	100+	199x–2016	47+	2006–2015
Oberon Pitterson	120+	1988–2006	27+	2006–2010

== Gallery ==
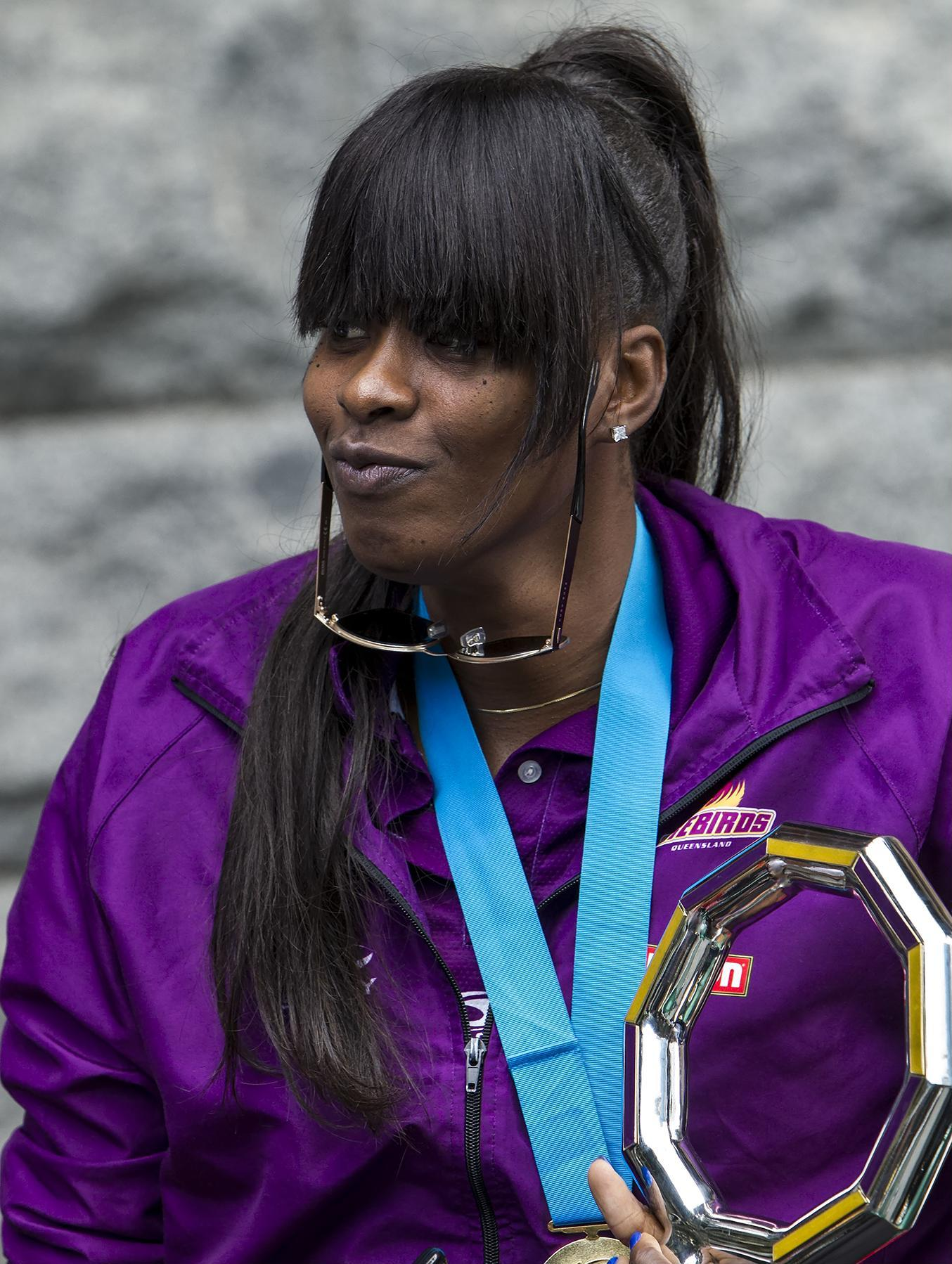
Romelda Aiken, bronze medallist at the 2007 World Netball Championships, 2023 Netball World Cup and the 2014 and 2018 Commonwealth Games

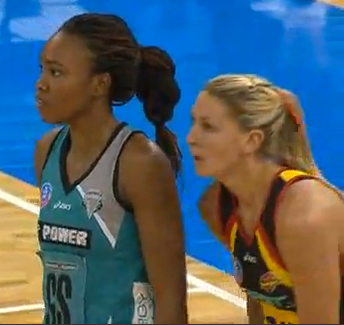
Carla Borrego; As Carla Williams, Borrego was a bronze medallist at the 2003 World Netball Championships.

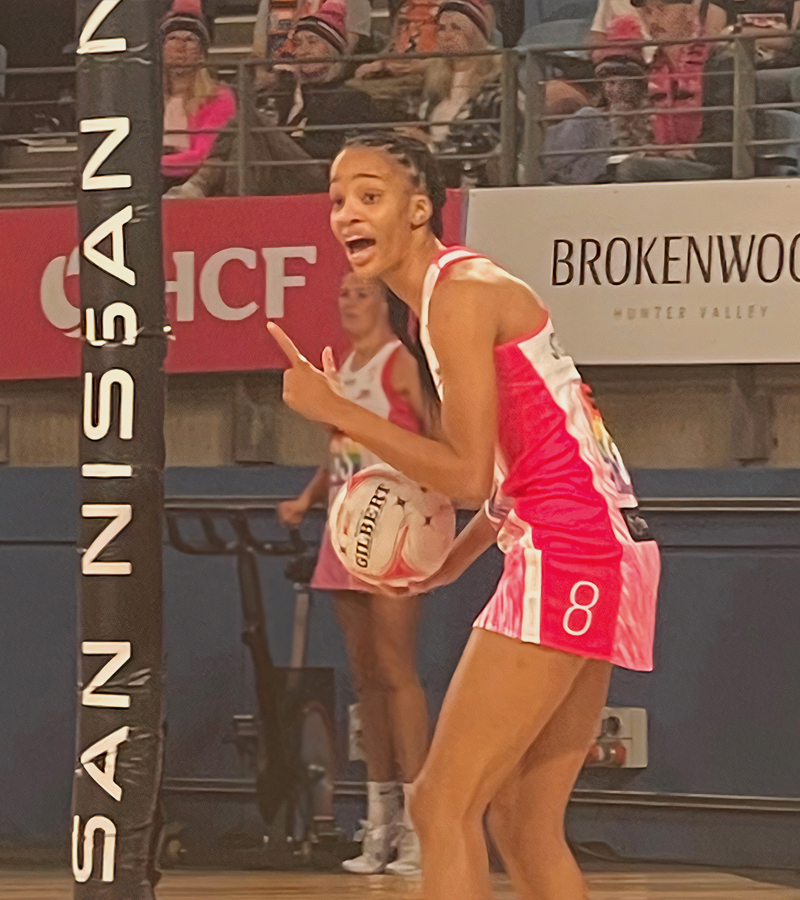
Shamera Sterling, bronze medallist at the 2018 Commonwealth Games and 2023 Netball World Cup, silver medallist at the 2022 Commonwealth Games
