= Jamaica at the 2018 Commonwealth Games =

- Flag of Jamaica
- CGF code: JAM
- CGA: Jamaica Olympic Association
- Website: www.joa.org.jm

in Gold Coast, Australia 4 April 2018 – 15 April 2018
- Competitors: 106 in 15 sports
- Flag bearer: Alia Atkinson (opening)
- Medals Ranked 11th: Gold 7 Silver 9 Bronze 11 Total 27

Commonwealth Games appearances (overview)
- 1934; 1938–1950; 1954; 1958; 1962; 1966; 1970; 1974; 1978; 1982; 1986; 1990; 1994; 1998; 2002; 2006; 2010; 2014; 2018; 2022; 2026; 2030

Jamaica competed at the 2018 Commonwealth Games in the Gold Coast, Australia from 4 to 15 April 2018. It was Jamaica's 17th appearance at the Commonwealth Games.

Swimmer Alia Atkinson was the country's flag bearer during the opening ceremony.

== Medalists ==
Medal	Name	Sport	Event	Date
Gold	Ronald Levy	Athletics	Men's 110 metres hurdles	10 April
Gold	Kimberly Williams	Athletics	Women's triple jump	10 April
Gold	Aisha Praught	Athletics	Women's 3000 metres steeplechase	11 April
Gold	Janieve Russell	Athletics	Women's 400 metres hurdles	12 April
Gold	Fedrick Dacres	Athletics	Men's discus throw	13 April
Gold	Danniel Thomas-Dodd	Athletics	Women's shot put	13 April
Gold	Christine Day; Anastasia Le-Roy; Stephenie McPherson; Janieve Russell	Athletics	Women's 4 × 400 metres relay	14 April
Silver	Alia Atkinson	Swimming	Women's 50 metre breaststroke	6 April
Silver	Christania Williams	Athletics	Women's 100 metres	9 April
Silver	Hansle Parchment	Athletics	Men's 110 metres hurdles	10 April
Silver	Shanieka Ricketts	Athletics	Women's triple jump	10 April
Silver	Anastasia Le-Roy	Athletics	Women's 400 metres	11 April
Silver	Shericka Jackson	Athletics	Women's 200 metres	12 April
Silver	Traves Smikle	Athletics	Men's discus throw	13 April
Silver	Danielle Williams	Athletics	Women's 100 metres hurdles	13 April
Silver	Gayon Evans; Natasha Morrison; Elaine Thompson; Christania Williams	Athletics	Women's 4 × 100 metres relay	14 April
Bronze	Yohan Blake	Athletics	Men's 100 metres	9 April
Bronze	Gayon Evans	Athletics	Women's 100 metres	9 April
Bronze	Javon Francis	Athletics	Men's 400 metres	10 April
Bronze	Stephenie McPherson	Athletics	Women's 400 metres	11 April
Bronze	Jaheel Hyde	Athletics	Men's 400 metres hurdles	12 April
Bronze	Tevaughn Thomas	Athletics	Men's 100 metres (T47)	13 April
Bronze	Natoya Goule	Athletics	Women's 800 metres	13 April
Bronze	Yanique Thompson	Athletics	Women's 100 metres hurdles	13 April
Bronze	Oshane Bailey; Yohan Blake; Everton Clarke; Warren Weir; Nigel Ellis	Athletics	Men's 4 × 100 metres relay	14 April
Bronze	Javon Francis; Demish Gaye; Jermaine Gayle; Jamari Rose; Peter Matthews	Athletics	Men's 4 × 400 metres relay	14 April
Bronze	Jamaica national netball team: Romelda Aiken; Nicole Dixon; Shanice Beckford; Stacian Facey; Jhaniele Fowler-Reid; Rebekah Robinson; Shamera Sterling; Adean Thomas; Paula Thompson; Khadijah Williams; Vangelee Williams; Jodi-Ann Ward	Netball	Women's tournament	15 April

== Competitors ==
The following is the list of number of competitors participating at the Games per sport/discipline.

Sport	Men	Women	Total
Athletics	30	21	51
Badminton	3	2	5
Basketball	0	10	10
Boxing	1	0	1
Cycling	1	0	1
Diving	1	0	1
Gymnastics	1	0	1
Lawn bowls	2	0	2
Netball	—N/a	12	12
Rugby sevens	12	0	12
Shooting	2	0	2
Squash	2	0	2
Swimming	0	1	1
Table tennis	2	0	2
Triathlon	1	1	2
Wrestling	1	0	1
Total	59	47	106

== Athletics ==
Jamaica participated with 51 athletes (30 men and 21 women).

Men
Track & road events

Athlete	Event	Heat		Semifinal		Final	
Athlete	Event	Result	Rank	Result	Rank	Result	Rank
Oshane Bailey	100 m	10.28	2 Q	10.32	4	Did not advance	
Yohan Blake	100 m	10.15	1 Q	10.06	1 Q	10.19	3rd place, bronze medalist(s)
Nigel Ellis	100 m	10.32	2 Q	10.38	7	Did not advance	
Jason Brown	100 m (T12)	11.49	4	—N/a		Did not advance	
Tevaughn Thomas	100 m (T47)	—N/a				11.63	3rd place, bronze medalist(s)
Kenroy Anderson	200 m	20.89	2 Q	DSQ		Did not advance	
Rasheed Dwyer	200 m	20.78	1 Q	20.82	5	Did not advance	
Warren Weir	200 m	20.60	1 Q	20.62	4 q	20.71	7
Javon Francis	400 m	45.70 SB	2 Q	45.38 SB	2 Q	45.11 SB	3rd place, bronze medalist(s)
Demish Gaye	400 m	45.70	3 Q	45.85	3 q	45.56	6
Rusheen McDonald	400 m	45.99	2 Q	45.77	2 Q	Did not finish	
Ronald Levy	110 m hurdles	13.35	2 Q	—N/a		13.19	1st place, gold medalist(s)
Hansle Parchment	110 m hurdles	13.30	1 Q	—N/a		13.22	2nd place, silver medalist(s)
Dejour Russell	110 m hurdles	13.64	4 q	—N/a		13.92	8
Andre Clarke	400 m hurdles	49.10 PB	2 Q	—N/a		50.08	7
Ricardo Cunningham	400 m hurdles	50.68	4	—N/a		Did not advance	
Jaheel Hyde	400 m hurdles	49.14	1 Q	—N/a		49.16	3rd place, bronze medalist(s)
Oshane Bailey; Yohan Blake; Everton Clarke; Warren Weir; Nigel Ellis*	4 × 100 m relay	38.44	2 Q	—N/a		38.35	3rd place, bronze medalist(s)
Javon Francis; Demish Gaye; Jermaine Gayle; Jamari Rose; Peter Matthews*	4 × 400 m relay	3:03.97	1 Q	—N/a		3:01.97	3rd place, bronze medalist(s)

* Competed in heats only.

Field events

Athlete	Event	Qualification		Final	
Athlete	Event	Distance	Rank	Distance	Rank
Damar Forbes	Long jump	7.93	5 Q	7.88	8
Tajay Gayle	Long jump	7.88	8 q	8.12	4
Shawn-D Thompson	Long jump	7.69	13	Did not advance	
Clive Pullen	Triple jump	16.15	8 q	16.25	7
Ashinia Miller	Shot put	19.35	6 Q	19.68	7
O'Dayne Richards	Shot put	19.65	4 Q	20.80	4
Fedrick Dacres	Discus throw	66.20	1 Q	68.20	1st place, gold medalist(s)
Traves Smikle	Discus throw	64.69	2 Q	63.98	2nd place, silver medalist(s)
Canigia Raynor	Hammer throw	—N/a		64.36	13

Women
Track & road events

Athlete	Event	Heat		Semifinal		Final	
Athlete	Event	Result	Rank	Result	Rank	Result	Rank
Gayon Evans	100 m	11.37	1 Q	11.37	2 Q	11.22 PB	3rd place, bronze medalist(s)
Natasha Morrison	100 m	11.36	1 Q	11.27	2 Q	11.31	5
Christania Williams	100 m	11.28	1 Q	11.22	1 Q	11.21	2nd place, silver medalist(s)
Shashalee Forbes	200 m	22.88	2 Q	22.93	2 Q	DSQ	
Shericka Jackson	200 m	22.87	1 Q	22.28	1 Q	22.18	2nd place, silver medalist(s)
Elaine Thompson	200 m	23.09	1 Q	22.95	2 Q	22.30	4
Tovea Jenkins	400 m	52.58	2 Q	DNS		Did not advance	
Anastasia Le-Roy	400 m	51.37 SB	2 Q	51.08 SB	1 Q	50.57 SB	2nd place, silver medalist(s)
Stephanie McPherson	400 m	50.80	1 Q	51.21	1 Q	50.93	3rd place, bronze medalist(s)
Natoya Goule	800 m	2:00.74	2 Q	—N/a		1:58.82	3rd place, bronze medalist(s)
Megan Simmonds	100 m hurdles	13.17	3 Q	—N/a		13.18	7
Yanique Thompson	100 m hurdles	12.95	2 Q	—N/a		12.97	3rd place, bronze medalist(s)
Danielle Williams	100 m hurdles	12.69	1 Q	—N/a		12.78	2nd place, silver medalist(s)
Janieve Russell	400 m hurdles	54.01 SB	1 Q	—N/a		54.33	1st place, gold medalist(s)
Ristananna Tracey	400 m hurdles	55.66	4 q	—N/a		57.50	8
Ronda Whyte	400 m hurdles	55.10	4 q	—N/a		55.02	4
Aisha Praught	3000 m steeplechase	—N/a				9:21.00	1st place, gold medalist(s)
Gayon Evans; Natasha Morrison; Elaine Thompson; Christania Williams	4 × 100 m relay	—N/a				42.52	2nd place, silver medalist(s)
Christine Day; Anastasia Le-Roy; Stephenie McPherson; Janieve Russell	4 × 400 m relay	—N/a				3:24.00	1st place, gold medalist(s)

Field events

Athlete	Event	Qualification		Final	
Athlete	Event	Distance	Position	Distance	Position
Shanieka Ricketts	Triple jump	—N/a		14.52	2nd place, silver medalist(s)
Kimberly Williams	Triple jump	—N/a		14.64	1st place, gold medalist(s)
Danniel Thomas-Dodd	Shot put	16.89	7 Q	19.36	1st place, gold medalist(s)

== Badminton ==
Jamaica participated with five athletes (three men and two women)

Singles

Athlete	Event	Round of 64	Round of 32	Round of 16	Quarterfinal	Semifinal	Final / BM	
Athlete	Event	Opposition Score	Opposition Score	Opposition Score	Opposition Score	Opposition Score	Opposition Score	Rank
Dennis Coke	Men's singles	Bye	Munga (KEN); W 2 - 0	Ho-Shue (CAN); L 0 - 2	Did not advance			
Samuel Ricketts	Men's singles	Bye	Yang (CAN); L 0 - 2	Did not advance				
Alana Bailey	Women's singles	Allet (MRI); L 0 - 2	Did not advance					
Katherine Wynter	Women's singles	le Tissier (GUE); W 2 - 0	Nakiyemba (UGA); W 2 - 0	Li (CAN); L 0 - 2	Did not advance			

Doubles

Athlete	Event	Round of 64	Round of 32	Round of 16	Quarterfinal	Semifinal	Final / BM	
Athlete	Event	Opposition Score	Opposition Score	Opposition Score	Opposition Score	Opposition Score	Opposition Score	Rank
Dennis Coke; Anthony McNee	Men's doubles	—N/a	Lindeman (CAN); Yang (CAN); L 0 - 2	Did not advance				
Alana Bailey; Katherine Wynter	Women's doubles	—N/a	Dean (FIJ); Whiteside (FIJ); L 1 - 2	Did not advance				
Katherine Wynter; Samuel Ricketts	Mixed doubles	Adeoye (FAI); Morris (FAI); W 2 - 0	Serasinghe (AUS); Mapasa (AUS); L 0 - 2	Did not advance				
Alana Bailey; Anthony McNee	Mixed doubles	Malcouzane (SEY); Ah-Wan (SEY); W 2 - 0	O Leydon-Davis (NZL); S Leydon-Davis (NZL); L 1 - 2	Did not advance				

Mixed team

Roster

- Alana Bailey
- Dennis Coke
- Anthony McNee
- Samuel Ricketts
- Katherine Wynter

Pool B

Pos	Team	Pld	W	L	MF	MA	MD	GF	GA	GD	PF	PA	PD	Pts	Qualification
1	Singapore	3	3	0	15	0	+15	30	0	+30	630	308	+322	3	Knockout stage
2	Mauritius	3	2	1	10	5	+5	20	13	+7	603	542	+61	2	Knockout stage
3	Jamaica	3	1	2	5	10	−5	13	23	−10	540	675	−135	1	
4	Zambia	3	0	3	0	15	−15	3	30	−27	435	683	−248	0	

Source: GC2018

Singapore
5
Carrara Sports and Leisure Centre, Gold Coast
5 April

Jamaica
0

			1	2	3
1	(Singapore) (Jamaica)	Terry Hee / Crystal Wong; Dennis Coke / Katherine Wynter	21; 9	21; 9
2	(Singapore) (Jamaica)	Ryan Ng; Samuel Ricketts	21; 16	21; 10
3	(Singapore) (Jamaica)	Grace Chua; Alana Bailey	21; 4	21; 6
4	(Singapore) (Jamaica)	Jason Wong / Danny Bawa Chrisnanta; Dennis Coke / Anthony McNee	21; 16	21; 12
5	(Singapore) (Jamaica)	Ren-ne Ong / Crystal Wong; Alana Bailey / Katherine Wynter	21; 3	21; 6

Mauritius
5
Carrara Sports and Leisure Centre, Gold Coast
5 April

Jamaica
0

			1	2	3
1	(Mauritius) (Jamaica)	Julien Paul; Samuel Ricketts	18; 21	21; 17	21; 14
2	(Mauritius) (Jamaica)	Kate Foo Kune; Alana Bailey	21; 7	21; 6
3	(Mauritius) (Jamaica)	Julien Paul / Aurélie Allet; Anthony McNee / Katherine Wynter	21; 19	18; 21	21; 13
4	(Mauritius) (Jamaica)	Kate Foo Kune / Nicki Chan-Lam; Alana Bailey / Katherine Wynter	17; 21	21; 14	21; 5
5	(Mauritius) (Jamaica)	Aatish Lubah / Christopher Jean Paul; Anthony McNee / Dennis Coke	21; 14	21; 15

Zambia
0
Carrara Sports and Leisure Centre, Gold Coast
6 April

Jamaica
5

			1	2	3
1	(Zambia) (Jamaica)	Chongo Mulenga / Evelyn Siamupangila; Anthony McNee / Alana Bailey	21; 14	9; 21	9; 21
2	(Zambia) (Jamaica)	Kalombo Mulenga; Samuel Ricketts	12; 21	9; 21
3	(Zambia) (Jamaica)	Ogar Siamupangila; Katherine Wynter	22; 20	20; 22	15; 21
4	(Zambia) (Jamaica)	Kalombo Mulenga / Chongo Mulenga; Anthony McNee / Dennis Coke	9; 21	21; 23
5	(Zambia) (Jamaica)	Ogar Siamupangila / Evelyn Siamupangila; Alana Bailey / Katherine Wynter	15; 21	21; 15	19; 21

== Basketball ==
Jamaica qualified a women's basketball team of 12 athletes. The team was invited by FIBA and the CGF.

=== Women's tournament ===
Roster

The following is the Jamaica roster in the women's basketball tournament of the 2018 Commonwealth Games.

Jamaica women's national basketball team - 2018 Commonwealth Games roster
Players
Coaches

Pos.	No.	Name	Age – Date of birth	Height	Club	Ctr.
G	4	Tarita Gordon	29 – 20 March 1989	1.65 m (5 ft 5 in)
G/F	5	Ashalee Gordon	20 – 5 June 1997	1.77 m (5 ft 10 in)		(Jamaica)
G	7	Loreta Gordon	24 – 11 January 1994	1.68 m (5 ft 6 in)	Unique Ballers	(Jamaica)
G	8	Sasha Dixon	30 – 10 June 1987	1.65 m (5 ft 5 in)	Homestead Cougars	(Jamaica)
F/C	9	Althea Byfield	35 – 28 November 1982	1.85 m (6 ft 1 in)	Homestead Cougars	(Jamaica)
F	10	Shenneika Smith	28 – 9 December 1989	1.87 m (6 ft 2 in)	Southern Lady Generals	(United States)
F	11	Angelee Latouche	33 – 16 February 1985	1.87 m (6 ft 2 in)	Walgrovians	(Jamaica)
G/F	12	Simone Jackson	33 – 12 April 1984	1.75 m (5 ft 9 in)	Braves Smilers	(Jamaica)
F	13	Cadene Cowan	25 – 17 March 1993
F	15	Jennifer George	27 – 22 February 1991	1.85 m (6 ft 1 in)	Montaneras de Morovis	(Puerto Rico)

Head coach

- (Jamaica) Rohan Robinson

Assistant coach(es)

- (Jamaica) Oneil Brown
- (Jamaica) Joyce Graham-Royal

Legend

- (C) Team captain
- Club - describes last
  club before the tournament
- Age - describes age
  on 5 April 2018

Pool B

Pos	Team	Pld	W	L	PF	PA	PD	Pts	Qualification
1	New Zealand	3	3	0	256	148	+108	6	Qualifying finals
2	Jamaica	3	2	1	196	195	+1	5	Qualifying finals
3	Malaysia	3	1	2	187	239	−52	4	
4	India	3	0	3	184	241	−57	3	

Source: GC2018
Rules for classification: 1) Points; 2) Head-to-head results; 3) Points difference; 4) Points scored.

5 April 2018
18:30

Boxscore

Jamaica	66–57	India
Scoring by quarter: 16–14, 15–13, 17–16, 18–14
Pts: George 19; Rebs: George 19; Asts: Dixon 6		Pts: Limaye 18; Rebs: Limaye, Sidhu 5 Asts: Sonkar 4

Cairns Convention Centre, Cairns
Referees: Artur Decastro (MOZ), Chris Dodds (SCO), Christine Vuong (CAN)

7 April 2018
11:30

Boxscore

New Zealand	80–49	Jamaica
Scoring by quarter: 17–16, 24–9, 19–14, 20–10
Pts: Leger-Walker 18; Rebs: Leger-Walker 6 Asts: Cocks 6		Pts: George 12; Rebs: Jackson 7 Asts: L. Gordon, Jackson 2

Cairns Convention Centre, Cairns
Referees: Christine Vuong (CAN), Ceciline Michael Vincent (IND), Artur Decastro (MOZ)

8 April 2018
20:00

Boxscore

Jamaica	81–58	Malaysia
Scoring by quarter: 21–21, 19–9, 17–17, 24–11
Pts: George 25; Rebs: George 20; Asts: three players 4		Pts: Ting 17; Rebs: Kalaimathi, Ting 6 Asts: Nur Izzati 5

Cairns Convention Centre, Cairns
Referees: Arnauld Kom Njilo (CMR), Sarah Carey (AUS), Kate Webb (ENG)

Qualifying finals

10 April 2018
18:30

Boxscore

England	62–40	Jamaica
Scoring by quarter: 13–4, 13–9, 22–16, 14–11
Pts: Vanderwal 22; Rebs: Stewart 8 Asts: Collins 6		Pts: T. Gordon 14; Rebs: George 14; Asts: Smith 4

Townsville Entertainment and Convention Centre, Townsville
Referees: Leonardo Zalazar (ARG), Michael Weiland (CAN), Snehal Bendke (IND)

== Boxing ==
Jamaica participated with a team of 1 athlete (1 man)

Men

Athlete	Event	Round of 16	Quarterfinals	Semifinals	Final	Rank
Athlete	Event	Opposition Result	Opposition Result	Opposition Result	Opposition Result	Rank
Ian Darby	−81 kg	Ato Plodzicki-Faoagali (SAM); L 0–5	Did not advance			

== Cycling ==
Jamaica participated with 1 athlete (1 man).

=== Road ===
Athlete	Event	Time	Rank
Oshane Williams	Men's road race	DNF	

=== Track ===
Points race

Athlete	Event	Qualification		Final	
Athlete	Event	Points	Rank	Points	Rank
Oshane Williams	Men's point race	DNF		Did not advance	

Scratch race

Athlete	Event	Qualification	Final
Oshane Williams	Men's scratch race	DNF	Did not advance

== Diving ==
Jamaica participated with a team of 1 athlete (1 man).

Men

Athlete	Event	Preliminaries		Final	
Athlete	Event	Points	Rank	Points	Rank
Yona Knight-Wisdom	1 m springboard	368.15	2 Q	388.65	4
Yona Knight-Wisdom	3 m springboard	365.85	10 Q	377.30	9

== Gymnastics ==
=== Artistic ===
Jamaica participated with 1 athlete (1 man).

Men
Individual Qualification

Athlete	Event	Apparatus						Total	Rank
Athlete	Event	F	PH	R	V	PB	HB	Total	Rank
Reiss Beckford	Qualification	13.450	11.300	13.350	14.000	13.650	12.375	78.125	12 Q

Individual Finals

Athlete	Event	Apparatus						Total	Rank
Athlete	Event	F	PH	R	V	PB	HB	Total	Rank
Reiss Beckford	All-around	11.400	12.775	13.450	13.450	12.600	11.000	74.675	16

== Lawn bowls ==
Jamaica will compete in Lawn bowls.

Men

Athlete	Event	Group stage						Quarterfinal	Semifinal	Final / BM	
Athlete	Event	Opposition Score	Opposition Score	Opposition Score	Opposition Score	Opposition Score	Rank	Opposition Score	Opposition Score	Opposition Score	Rank
Andrew Newell	Singles	McIlroy (NZL); L 0 - 21	Kimani (KEN); L 2 - 21	Paxton (ENG); W 21 - 16	Xalxo (IND); W 21 - 18	Kumar (FIJ); L 3 - 21	5	Did not advance			
Mervyn Edwards; Andrew Newell	Pairs	South Africa; L 6–28	Wales; L 4–33	Northern Ireland; L 6–28	Isle of Man; L 10–21	—N/a	5	Did not advance			

== Netball ==
Jamaica qualified a netball team by virtue of being ranked in the top 11 (excluding the host nation, Australia) of the INF World Rankings on 1 July 2017.

Roster

- Romelda Aiken
- Nicole Dixon
- Shanice Beckford
- Stacian Facey
- Jhaniele Fowler-Reid
- Rebekah Robinson
- Shamera Sterling
- Adean Thomas
- Paula Thompson
- Khadijah Williams
- Vangelee Williams
- Jodi-Ann Ward

Pool A

Pos	Team	Pld	W	D	L	GF	GA	GD	Pts	Qualification
1	Australia (H)	5	5	0	0	413	162	+251	10	Semi-finals
2	Jamaica	5	4	0	1	351	221	+130	8	Semi-finals
3	South Africa	5	3	0	2	310	205	+105	6	Classification matches
4	Northern Ireland	5	2	0	3	224	307	−83	4	Classification matches
5	Barbados	5	1	0	4	185	333	−148	2	Classification matches
6	Fiji	5	0	0	5	171	426	−255	0	Classification matches

Updated to match(es) played on 11 April 2018. Source: GC2018
(H) Hosts

5 April 2018
13:00

Report
Jamaica
88–30
Fiji

Gold Coast Convention and Exhibition Centre
Umpires: Jackie Mizon
Angela Armonstrong-Lush
Reserve umpire: Marc Henning
Fowler-Reid 40/43 (93%)
Aiken 24/32 (75%)
Robinson 15/16 (94%)
Beckford 9/11 (82%)

M. Rusivakula 17/19 (89%)
Waqa 7/11 (64%)
Paul 3/7 (43%)
U. Rusivakula 3/5 (60%)

6 April 2018
15:00

Report
South Africa
46–57
Jamaica

Gold Coast Convention and Exhibition Centre
Umpires: Gary Burgess
Michelle Phippard
Reserve umpire: Helen George
Venter 19/23 (83%)
Burger 15/15 (100%)
Holtzhausen 12/18 (67%)

Fowler-Reid 29/31 (94%)
Beckford 15/20 (75%)
Aiken 13/16 (81%)

8 April 2018
13:00

Report
Jamaica
79–41
Northern Ireland

Gold Coast Convention and Exhibition Centre
Umpires: Jackie Mizon
Kristie Simpson
Reserve umpire: Angela Armstrong-Lush
Fowler-Reid 32/33 (97%)
Aiken 26/28 (93%)
Beckford 11/11 (100%)
Robinson 10/11 (91%)

Bowman 23/32 (72%)
K. Bowman 11/16 (69%)
Lennon 7/8 (88%)

9 April 2018
18:30

Report
Jamaica
76–32
Barbados

Gold Coast Convention and Exhibition Centre
Umpires: Maria van der Merwe
Marc Henning
Reserve umpire: Gary Burgess
Fowler-Reid 32/36 (89%)
Aiken 28/33 (85%)
Beckford 12/14 (86%)
Robinson 4/8 (50%)

Blackman 17/19 (89%)
Wharton 9/12 (75%)
Payne 6/9 (67%)

11 April 2018
21:00

Report
Australia
72–51
Jamaica

Gold Coast Convention and Exhibition Centre
Umpires: Gary Burgess
Lisa McPhail
Reserve umpire: Kristie Simpson
Bassett 22/23 (96%)
Thwaites 22/22 (100%)
Pettitt 20/21 (95%)
Wood 8/10 (80%)

Fowler-Reid 30/32 (94%)
Aiken 11/14 (79%)
Beckford 8/12 (67%)
Robinson 2/2 (100%)

Semi-finals

14 April 2018
15:00

Report
England
56–55
Jamaica

Coomera Indoor Sports Centre
Umpires: Marc Henning
Michelle Phippard
Reserve umpire: Joshua Bowring
Housby 29/35 (83%)
Harten 16/18 (89%)
Haythornthwaite 11/13 (85%)

Fowler-Reid 47/50 (94%)
Beckford 8/9 (89%)

Bronze medal match

15 April 2018
11:00

Report
New Zealand
55–60
Jamaica

Coomera Indoor Sports Centre
Umpires: Marc Henning
Michelle Phippard
Reserve umpire: Joshua Bowring
Folau 34/44 (77%)
Mes 12/20 (60%)
Ekenasio 9/13 (69%)

Aiken 24/31 (77%)
Fowler-Reid 21/22 (95%)
Beckford 15/18 (83%)

== Rugby sevens ==
=== Men's tournament ===
Jamaica qualified a men's rugby sevens team of 12 athletes, by winning the 2017 RAN Sevens. This will mark the country's Commonwealth Games debut in the sport.

Roster

- Rhodri Adamson
- Nyle Beckett
- Anthony Bingham
- Tyler Bush
- Mikel Facey
- Owen Linton
- Conan Osborne
- Reinhardo Richards
- Lucas Roy-Smith
- Ashley Smith
- Gareth Stoppani
- Marcus Webber

Pool B

Pos	Team	Pld	W	D	L	PF	PA	PD	Pts	Qualification
1	England	3	3	0	0	97	22	+75	9	Semi-finals
2	Australia	3	2	0	1	73	38	+35	7	Classification semi-finals
3	Samoa	3	1	0	2	43	64	−21	5	
4	Jamaica	3	0	0	3	17	106	−89	3	

Source: GC2018
Rules for classification: 1) Points; 2) Head-to-head result; 3) Point difference; 4) Points scored.

14 April 2018
9:53

England	38–5	Jamaica
Try: Mitchell (2) 1' m, 6' c Norton (2) 4' c, 12' m Glover 5' c Lindsay-Hague 8' c Con: Mitchell (3/4) 4', 5', 6'; Bibby (1/2) 8'	(Gold Goast 2018)	Try: Smith 10' m Con: Roy-Smith (0/1); Cards: Adamson (yellow card) 1' to 3'

Robina Stadium, Gold Coast
Referee: Jordan Way (Australia)

14 April 2018
13:11

Australia	32–5	Jamaica
Try: O'Donnell 1' m Longbottom (3) 2' m, 5' m, 14' m Porch 4' m Myers 11' c Con: Porch (0/4); Quinn (1/2) 11'; Cards: Killingworth (yellow card) 13'	(Gold Coast 2018)	Try: Bush 7' m Con: Stoppani (0/1); Cards: Beckett (yellow card) 11' to 13'

Robina Stadium, Gold Coast
Referee: Craig Evans (Wales)

14 April 2018
19:43

Samoa	36–7	Jamaica
Try: Tupou 1' c Alofipo 3' c Afamasaga (2) 7' m, 8' c Paulo 11' m Motuga 12' m Con: Tupou (2/3) 1', 8'; Alosio Logotuli (1/2) 3'; Paulo (0/1)	(Gold Coast 2018)	Try: Richards 10' c Con: Adamson (1/1) 11'

Robina Stadium, Gold Coast
Referee: Jordan Way (Australia)

== Shooting ==
Jamaica participated with 2 athletes (2 men).

Open

Athlete	Event	Day 1		Day 2		Day 3		Total	
Athlete	Event	Points	Rank	Points	Rank	Points	Rank	Overall	Rank
Denis Nelson	Queen's prize individual	99-6v	26	143-10v	24	129-7v	29	371-23v	29
David Rickman	Queen's prize individual	95-2v	30	144-8v	23	136-9v	28	375-19v	27
Denis Nelson; David Rickman	Queen's prize pairs	280-12v	13	250-6v	13	—N/a		530-18v	13

== Squash ==
Jamaica participated with 2 athletes (2 men).

Individual

Athlete	Event	Round of 64	Round of 32	Round of 16	Quarterfinals	Semifinals	Final	
Athlete	Event	Opposition Score	Opposition Score	Opposition Score	Opposition Score	Opposition Score	Opposition Score	Rank
Christopher Binnie	Men's singles	Jason Doyle (SVG); W 3 - 0	Saurav Ghosal (IND); W 3 - 2	Joel Makin (WAL); L 0 - 3	Did not advance			
Lewis Walters	Men's singles	Peter Creed (WAL); W 3 - 1	Daniel Zammit-Lewis (MLT); W 3 - 0	Cameron Pilley (AUS); L 0 - 3	Did not advance			

Doubles

Athlete	Event	Group stage			Round of 16	Quarterfinals	Semifinals	Final	
Athlete	Event	Opposition Score	Opposition Score	Rank	Opposition Score	Opposition Score	Opposition Score	Opposition Score	Rank
Christopher Binnie; Lewis Walters	Men's doubles	Alexander / Palmer (AUS); L 0 - 2	Frazer / Kelly (CAY); W 2 - 0	2 Q	Malhotra / Tandon (IND); L 0 - 2	Did not advance			

== Swimming ==
Jamaica participated with 1 athlete (1 woman).

Women

Athlete	Event	Heat		Semifinal		Final	
Athlete	Event	Time	Rank	Time	Rank	Time	Rank
Alia Atkinson	50 m breaststroke	30.98	5 Q	30.53	1 Q	30.76	2nd place, silver medalist(s)
Alia Atkinson	100 m breaststroke	1:09.83	15 Q	1:09.83	14	Did not advance	
Alia Atkinson	50 m butterfly	26.91	6 Q	26.84	7 Q	27.35	8

== Table tennis ==
Jamaica participated with 2 athletes (2 men).

Singles

Athletes	Event	Group stage			Round of 64	Round of 32	Round of 16	Quarterfinal	Semifinal	Final	Rank
Athletes	Event	Opposition Score	Opposition Score	Rank	Opposition Score	Opposition Score	Opposition Score	Opposition Score	Opposition Score	Opposition Score	Rank
Simon Tomlinson	Men's singles	Hodge (SKN); W 4 - 0	Jayasingha Mudiyanselage (SRI); L 3 - 4	2	Did not advance						
Kane Watson	Men's singles	Daniel (SVG); W 4 - 0	Muhamad Rizal (MAS); L 2 - 4	2	Did not advance						

Doubles

Athletes	Event	Round of 64	Round of 32	Round of 16	Quarterfinal	Semifinal	Final	Rank
Athletes	Event	Opposition Score	Opposition Score	Opposition Score	Opposition Score	Opposition Score	Opposition Score	Rank
Simon Tomlinson; Kane Watson	Men's doubles	Bye	Aruna / Toriola (NGR); L 0 - 3	Did not advance				

== Triathlon ==
Jamaica participated with 2 athletes (1 man and 1 woman).

Individual

Athlete	Event	Swim (750 m)	Trans 1	Bike (20 km)	Trans 2	Run (5 km)	Total	Rank
Phillip McCatty	Men's	13:56	0:45	33:43	0:31	20:24	1:09:19	32
Llori Sharpe	Women's	11:45	0:51	36:39	0:37	22:06	1:11:58	22

== Wrestling ==
Jamaica participated with 1 athlete (1 man).

Men

Athlete	Event	Round of 16	Quarterfinal	Semifinal	Repechage	Final / BM	
Athlete	Event	Opposition Result	Opposition Result	Opposition Result	Opposition Result	Opposition Result	Rank
Kevin Wallen	-86 kg	Mackey (BAH); W 3 - 1	Moore (CAN); L 0 - 4	Did not advance			7

== See also ==
- Jamaica at the 2018 Summer Youth Olympics
