= Netball Jamaica Elite League =

Top level netball league in Jamaica

- Sport: Netball
- Founded: 2013
- First season: 2014
- Administrator: Netball Jamaica
- No. of teams: 5 (2025)
- Country: Jamaica
- Venue: National Stadium
- Most recent champion: Kingston Hummingbirds
- Most titles: Kingston Hummingbirds; Manchester Spurs (3 titles each)
- Broadcaster: SportsMax TV/YouTube
- Sponsor: Red Stripe
- Level on pyramid: 1

The Netball Jamaica Elite League is the top level netball league featuring teams from Jamaica. It was formed in 2013 and is organised by Netball Jamaica. The league features teams representing the parishes of Jamaica. Between 2013 and 2019, due to sponsorship and naming rights arrangements, the league was known as the Berger Elite League. In 2014, Kingston Hummingbirds were the inaugural winners. Kingston Hummingbirds and Manchester Spurs are the league's most successful teams.

== History ==
=== Berger Elite League ===
The Berger Elite League was formed in 2013. It featured with six teams – Clarendon Gaters, Kingston Hummingbirds, Manchester Spurs, St Ann Orchids, St Catherine Racers and St James Sharpes. With a team coached by Sylvester Campbell and captained by Elaine Davis, Kingston Hummingbirds won the inaugural title after defeating St Catherine Racers 2–1 in a best of three series. Hummingbirds' Stacian Facey was named series MVP. With a team coached by Dalton Hinds and captained by Nicole Aiken-Pinnock, Clarendon Gaters won the 2015 title after defeating St. James Sharpes. They were confirmed as champions after establishing a 2–0 lead in a best of three series.

As part of their preparation for the 2017 Netball World Youth Cup, the 2016–17 season saw two teams featuring Jamaica Under-21 players temporarily join the league. They played as the Under-21 Shiners and the Under-21 Suns. The Under-21 Suns secured wins against both Kingston Hummingbirds and Clarendon Gaters, the champions from the two previous seasons, and qualified for the semi-finals. However, as a development team, they were deemed ineligible to participate in the playoffs. With a team coached by Janet Guy and captained by Simone Forbes, St Ann Orchids eventually won the 2016–17 title after defeating Kingston Hummingbirds in the best-of-three finals. Orchids recorded a 49–37 win over Hummingbirds in the deciding match to win the series 2–1.

In 2017–18, with a team coached by Marvette Anderson, Kingston Hummingbirds won their second title after defeating Connie Francis' Manchester Spurs in the best-of-three finals. The 2018–19 season saw Connie Francis and Manchester Spurs, return to the final. This time, they won their first title, getting the better of Kingston Hummingbirds in the best-of-three series. Hummingbirds won the opening match before Spurs levelled the series. Spurs clinched the title with a 71–65 extra-time win in match three.

=== Relaunch ===
In May 2020, Netball Jamaica confirmed that the 2020 Elite League had been cancelled due to the COVID-19 pandemic. However, due to a lack of sponsorship, the league did return until 2023. The relaunched league featured four teams – Kingston Hummingbirds, Manchester Spurs, St Ann Orchids and St Catherine Racers. The 2023 season saw Manchester Spurs win their second title. With a team coached by Rasheed Josephs and captained by Shanice Beckford, Spurs emerged as champions after overcoming St Ann Orchids 2–0 in a best-of-three series. Beckford was also named the Finals MVP. In 2024, Manchester Spurs won their third title. With a team captained by Shannika Johnson, they won their third successive title after a 45–38 over St Catherine Racers in a one off final. In 2025, Kingston Hummingbirds also won their third title after defeating Manchester Spurs 52–50 in the final.

== Format ==
- At the start of the season, a number of players are entered in a pool. Players are allocated to each team by a draft. In 2017, all 75 players were entered in the pool for the first time.
- Netball Jamaica Elite League matches are hosted at the Leila Robinson Netball Courts and the National Indoor Sports Centre, both located within the National Stadium complex. Matches for the 2025 season were primarily held on Fridays and Sundays at these venues. The National Indoor Sports Centre is often used for indoor matches, while the Leila Robinson Netball Courts are used for outdoor games. The 2025 season took place between 27 June and 27 July. It featured five teams, 15 matches and 56 players.

== Teams ==
=== 2025 teams ===
Team	Parish	Colours
Kingston Hummingbirds	Kingston Parish	
Manchester Spurs	Manchester Parish	
St Anne Orchids	Saint Ann Parish	
St Catherine Racers	Saint Catherine Parish	
JPS Shiners^{1}	Saint Andrew Parish	

=== Former teams ===
Team	Parish	Colours
Clarendon Gaters^{2}	Clarendon Parish	
St James Sharpes^{2}	Saint James Parish	
Under-21 Suns^{3}		

Notes

- ^1 Shiners are the Jamaica Under-21 squad. As part of their preparation for the 2017 Netball World Youth Cup, they played the 2016–17 season as Under-21 Shiners. As part of their preparation for the 2025 Netball World Youth Cup, they played the 2024 season as St Andrew Shiners and the 2025 season as JPS Shiners. They were sponsored by the Jamaica Public Service.
- ^2 Clarendon Gaters and St James Sharpes were both founder members of the league. They continued to play until 2019. However, they subsequently folded and did not return for the 2023 relaunch.
- ^3 Like the Shiners, the Under-21 Suns featured Jamaica Under-21 players. As part of their preparation for the 2017 Netball World Youth Cup, they played the 2016–17 season. The Suns secured wins against both Kingston Hummingbirds and Clarendon Gaters, the champions from the two previous seasons, and qualified for the semi-finals. However, as a development team, they were deemed ineligible to participate in the playoffs.

== Winners ==
Between 2014 and 2023, the league used a best-of-three series format for its final.

=== Best of three series ===
Season	Winners	Runners Up	Finals MVP	Winning Captain	Winning Coach
2014	Kingston Hummingbirds	St. Catherine Racers	Stacian Facey	Elaine Davis	Sylvester Campbell
2015	Clarendon Gaters	St. James Sharpes	Kadie-Ann Dehaney	Nicole Aiken-Pinnock	Dalton Hinds
2016–17	St. Ann Orchids	Kingston Hummingbirds		Simone Forbes	Janet Guy
2017–18	Kingston Hummingbirds	Manchester Spurs			Marvette Anderson
2018–19	Manchester Spurs	Kingston Hummingbirds		Tracey Robinson	Connie Francis
2023	Manchester Spurs	St Ann Orchids	Shanice Beckford	Shanice Beckford	Rasheed Josephs

=== Single match final ===
Season	Winners	Score	Runners Up	Final MVP	Winning Captain	Winning Coach
2024	Manchester Spurs	45–38	St Catherine Racers		Shannika Johnson	
2025	Kingston Hummingbirds	52–50	Manchester Spurs	Tracy-Ann Francis		
2026						

== Notable players ==
=== Internationals ===
Jamaica

- Nicole Aiken-Pinnock
- Shanice Beckford
- Nadine Bryan
- Althea Byfield
- Elaine Davis
- Kadie-Ann Dehaney
- Nicole Dixon
- Kasey Evering
- Stacian Facey
- Simone Forbes
- Sasher-Gaye Henry
- Malysha Kelly
- Shimona Nelson
- Rebekah Robinson
- Shamera Sterling
- Adean Thomas
- Paula Thompson
- Khadijah Williams
- Vangelee Williams

== Title sponsors ==
Sponsors	Seasons
Berger Paints	2014–2019
Seprod Group	2023
Red Stripe	2024–
