= 2023 England Jamaica netball series =

International netball series between England and Jamaica

Tournament details
- Host country: England
- Dates: 11–15 January 2023
- Teams: 2

Final positions
- Champions: England
- Runners-up: Jamaica

Tournament statistics
- Matches played: 3

The 2023 England Jamaica netball series saw England host Jamaica in January 2023 for a three-match series. England won the series 2–1. The matches were played at Manchester Arena and the Copper Box Arena in London.

== Background ==
England and Jamaica last competed against each other in 2021; England won that series 2–1. Prior to the series, England were ranked third in the world, and Jamaica were fourth. The series was used as preparation for the 2023 Netball World Cup.

The first match of the series was held at the Manchester Arena and the final two matches took place at the Copper Box Arena in London. In the United Kingdom, the series was shown on BBC TV and online.

== Squads ==
Squad lists
England	Jamaica
Imogen Allison; Eleanor Cardwell; Jade Clarke; Sophie Drakeford-Lewis; Funmi Fadoju; Layla Guscoth; Jo Harten; Alice Harvey; Helen Housby; Laura Malcolm; Elle McDonald; Geva Mentor; Natalie Metcalf; Chelsea Pitman; Olivia Tchine; Francesca Williams	Jhaniele Fowler (captain); Shanice Beckford (vice-captain); Theresa Beckford; Kadie-Ann Dehaney; Nicole Dixon-Rocherster; Tafiya Hunter; Malysha Kelly; Roxonna McLean; Shimona Nelson; Crystal Plummer; Rebekah Robinson; Abigale Sutherland; Jodi-Ann Ward; Khadijah Williams

== Matches ==
=== 1st Test ===
The match was the first international at the Manchester Arena since 2016. Jamaica took an early lead of six goals, before England took the lead in the third quarter. They won the final quarter 24–5. The match attendance was 6,652.

11 January 2023; 7:15pm (GMT)	Report; Stats	England	73–52	Jamaica	Manchester Arena, Manchester; Attendance: 6,652
11 January 2023; 7:15pm (GMT)	Report; Stats	Scoring by quarter: 13–19, 18–15, 18–13, 24–5			Manchester Arena, Manchester; Attendance: 6,652

=== 2nd Test ===
Jhaniele Fowler scored 56 goals as Jamaica came from behind to win the match and level the series. After one quarter, England were ahead 18–12, though Jamaica overturned the deficit and led 31–27 at half time. Jamaica led by 10 goals at one point, but this was reduced to 48–41 after three quarters, for a final score of 61–58.

14 January 2023; 2:15pm (GMT)	Report; Stats	England	58–61	Jamaica	Copper Box Arena, London
14 January 2023; 2:15pm (GMT)	Report; Stats	Scoring by quarter: 18–12, 9–19, 14–17, 17–13			Copper Box Arena, London

=== 3rd Test ===
The final match of the series was a close encounter; after two quarters, Jamaica led by a single goal. In the third quarter, Crystal Plummer was suspended for continuous obstruction, giving England a numerical advantage for two minutes. England scored narrowly more goals in the third and fourth quarters to win 63–59. As a result, England won the series 2–1.

15 January 2023; 2:00pm (GMT)	Report; Stats	England	63–59	Jamaica	Copper Box Arena, London
15 January 2023; 2:00pm (GMT)	Report; Stats	Scoring by quarter: 20–16, 10–15, 18–13, 15–15			Copper Box Arena, London
