= 2016 Taini Jamison Trophy Series =

International netball series

Tournament details
- Host country: New Zealand
- Dates: 11–17 September 2016
- Teams: 2
- TV partner: Sky Sport (New Zealand)

Final positions
- Champions: New Zealand (7th title)
- Runners-up: Jamaica

Tournament statistics
- Matches played: 3
- Top scorer(s): Bailey Mes 88/103 (85%)

The 2016 Taini Jamison Trophy Series was the eighth Taini Jamison Trophy series. It featured New Zealand playing Jamaica in a series of three netball test matches, played in September 2016. New Zealand won all three tests. New Zealand were coached by Janine Southby and captained by Katrina Grant. Jamaica were coached by Minneth Reynolds and captained by Malysha Kelly.

== Squads ==
=== New Zealand ===
New Zealand roster
Players
Coaches

Name	Pos	DOB	Height	Club	Nat	Caps
Kayla Cullen	GD, WD, C	13 February 1992 (aged 24)	1.83 m (6 ft 0 in)	Northern Mystics
Ameliaranne Ekenasio	GS, GA	11 January 1991 (aged 25)	1.86 m (6 ft 1 in)	Central Pulse
Shannon Francois	WA, C, GA	12 October 1990 (aged 25)	1.76 m (5 ft 9 in)	Southern Steel
Katrina Grant (c)	GK, GD, WD	6 May 1987 (aged 29)	1.87 m (6 ft 2 in)	Central Pulse
Phoenix Karaka	GK, GD	6 November 1993 (aged 22)	1.86 m (6 ft 1 in)	Central Pulse
Laura Langman (vc)	C, WD	16 April 1986 (aged 30)	1.73 m (5 ft 8 in)	New South Wales Swifts
Bailey Mes	GS, GA	27 May 1989 (aged 27)	1.87 m (6 ft 2 in)	Mainland Tactix
Storm Purvis	GD, GK	20 April 1993 (aged 23)	1.86 m (6 ft 1 in)	Southern Steel
Grace Rasmussen	GA, WA	18 March 1988 (aged 28)	1.77 m (5 ft 10 in)	Waikato Bay of Plenty Magic
Te Paea Selby-Rickit	GS, GA	14 January 1992 (aged 24)	1.93 m (6 ft 4 in)	Southern Steel
Jane Watson	GK, GD, WD	7 March 1990 (aged 26)	1.81 m (5 ft 11 in)	Southern Steel
Maia Wilson	GS	21 September 1997 (aged 18)	1.87 m (6 ft 2 in)	Central Pulse

Head coach

- Janine Southby

Notes

- (c) – Captain
- (cc) – Co-captain
- (vc) – Vice-captain
- – Injury / maternity leave
- (TRP) – Temporary Replacement Player

Debuts

- Storm Purvis made her senior debut for New Zealand in the first test.
- Maia Wilson made her senior debut for New Zealand in the second test.

=== Jamaica ===
Jamaica roster
Players
Coaches

Name	Pos	DOB	Height	Club	Nat	Caps
Shanice Beckford	GA, WA	4 April 1995 (aged 21)	1.70 m (5 ft 7 in)	Team Northumbria
Kerry-Ann Brown	WA, WD	3 July 1986 (aged 30)	1.75 m (5 ft 9 in)
Nicole Dixon	WA, C	3 February 1995 (aged 21)	1.65 m (5 ft 5 in)
Stacian Facey	GK, GD, WD	9 August 1993 (aged 23)	1.80 m (5 ft 11 in)
Malysha Kelly (c)	GD, GK	14 January 1990 (aged 20)	1.85 m (6 ft 1 in)	Manchester Thunder
Abbeygail Linton	WD		–
Rebekah Robinson	GA	23 January 1995 (aged 21)	1.77 m (5 ft 10 in)
Shantal Slater	GS		–
Shamera Sterling	GK, GD	21 October 1995 (aged 20)	1.90 m (6 ft 3 in)
Adean Thomas	C, WA, WD	31 July 1994 (aged 22)	1.72 m (5 ft 8 in)
Vanessa Walker	GA		–
Vangelee Williams	GK, GD, WD	26 May 1992 (aged 24)	1.83 m (6 ft 0 in)

Head coach

- Minneth Reynolds

Notes

- (c) – Captain
- (cc) – Co-captain
- (vc) – Vice-captain
- – Injury / maternity leave
- (TRP) – Temporary Replacement Player

== Matches ==
=== First test ===
11 September 2016	New Zealand	72–34	Jamaica	Trafalgar Centre	Sky Sport
11 September 2016	Scoring by quarter: 19–8, 35–15, 54–23, 72–34			Trafalgar Centre	Sky Sport
11 September 2016	Bailey Mes 40/47 (85%); Ameliaranne Ekenasio 17/21 (81%); Te Paea Selby-Rickit 15/18 (83%)		Shanice Beckford 15/19 (79%); Shantal Slater 10/12 (83%); Vanessa Walker 9/14 (64%)	Trafalgar Centre	Sky Sport

=== Second test ===
14 September 2016	New Zealand	61–38	Jamaica	Central Energy Trust Arena; Attendance: 2,523	Sky Sport
14 September 2016	Scoring by quarter: 14–9, 29–16, 42–29, 61–38			Central Energy Trust Arena; Attendance: 2,523	Sky Sport
14 September 2016	Te Paea Selby-Rickit 27/38 (71%); Bailey Mes 23/28 (82%); Ameliaranne Ekenasio 8/12 (67%); Maia Wilson 3/4 (75%)		Shantal Slater 23/29 (79%); Shanice Beckford 9/15 (60%); Vanessa Walker 6/8 (75%)	Central Energy Trust Arena; Attendance: 2,523	Sky Sport

=== Third test ===
17 September 2016	New Zealand	66–38	Jamaica	Energy Events Centre	Sky Sport
17 September 2016	Scoring by quarter: 13–13, 35–20, 50–28, 66–38			Energy Events Centre	Sky Sport
17 September 2016	Bailey Mes 25/28 (89%); Te Paea Selby-Rickit 18/21 (86%); Ameliaranne Ekenasio 13/15 (87%); Maia Wilson 10/11 (91%)		Shantal Slater 21/25 (84%); Shanice Beckford 16/20 (80%); Vanessa Walker 1/2 (50%); Rebekah Robinson 0/1 (0%)	Energy Events Centre	Sky Sport
