= 2021 England Jamaica netball series =

International netball series between England and Jamaica

Tournament details
- Host country: England
- Venue(s): Copper Box Arena, London; Motorpoint Arena Nottingham
- Dates: 28 November – 5 December 2021
- Teams: 2

Final positions
- Champions: England
- Runners-up: Jamaica

Tournament statistics
- Matches played: 3

The 2021 England Jamaica netball series also known as the Vitality Roses Reunited Series was a three-match series, contested between England and Jamaica from 28 November to 5 December 2021. England won the series after winning the first two matches, and Jamaica won the final match.

== Background ==
England and Jamaica last played each other during the 2020 Netball Nations Cup; Jamaica won that match. Jamaica had planned to tour England in January 2021, though that series was postponed due to travel restrictions relating to the COVID-19 pandemic. It was the first time since the 2020 Netball Nations Cup that England played a match at home with spectators.

Prior to the series, England played a warm up match against an England A team, and Jamaica played two warm up fixtures against England A. The first match of the Vitality Roses Reunited Series was held at the Copper Box Arena in London, and the remaining two fixtures were at the Motorpoint Arena Nottingham.

== Squads ==
Squad lists
England	Jamaica
Imogen Allison; Eleanor Cardwell; Jade Clarke; Beth Cobden; Sophie Drakeford-Lewis; Funmi Fadoju; George Fisher; Stacey Francis-Bayman; Layla Guscoth; Serena Guthrie (captain); Natalie Haythornthwaite (vice-captain); Jo Harten; Helen Housby; Laura Malcolm; Eboni Usoro-Brown; Francesca Williams	Gezelle Allison; Shanice Beckford; Kadie-Ann Dehaney; Jhaniele Fowler (captain); Shadian Hemmings; Malysha Kelly; Amanda Pinkney; Shamera Sterling; Adean Thomas; Khadijah Williams; Latanya Wilson

== Matches ==
=== First Test ===
After two quarters of the match, Jamaica led England 26–25. England took the lead in the third quarter and maintained it throughout, eventually winning by 10 points.

28 November 2021; 16:00 UTC	Report; Stats	England	55–45	Jamaica	Copper Box Arena, London	Sky Sports (UK)
28 November 2021; 16:00 UTC	Report; Stats	Scoring by quarter: 10–11, 25–26, 41–35, 55–45			Copper Box Arena, London	Sky Sports (UK)

=== Second Test ===
England had the lead throughout, leading 21–13 after the first quarter and 35–19 at half-time. England eventually won 66–47. It was the first time since 2013 that England had won a series against Jamaica.

4 December 2021; 16:00 UTC	Report; Stats	England	66–47	Jamaica	Motorpoint Arena Nottingham	Sky Sports (UK)
4 December 2021; 16:00 UTC	Report; Stats	Scoring by quarter: 21–13, 35–19, 49–33, 66–47			Motorpoint Arena Nottingham	Sky Sports (UK)

=== Third Test ===
At half time, Jamaica were leading 32–24. The third quarter was drawn, and Jamaica won the fourth quarter, eventually winning 63–53.

5 December 2021; 16:00 UTC	Report; Stats	England	53–63	Jamaica	Motorpoint Arena Nottingham	Sky Sports (UK)
5 December 2021; 16:00 UTC	Report; Stats	Scoring by quarter: 11–14, 24–32, 40–48, 53–63			Motorpoint Arena Nottingham	Sky Sports (UK)
