= List of netball players =

== World's Best Netballers ==
There is no official World Netballer of the Year award handed out by World Netball. However since 2013, the The Guardian newspaper and than the Netball Scoop website have named their World's Best Netballer.

The Guardian World's Best Netballer

| Year | Name | Country | Team |
|---|---|---|---|
| 2013 | Laura Langman | New Zealand | Northern Mystics |
| 2014 | Geva Mentor | England | Melbourne Vixens |
| 2015 | Caitlin Bassett | Australia | West Coast Fever |

Netball Scoop World's Best Netballer

| Year | Name | Country | Team |
|---|---|---|---|
| 2016 | Sharni Layton | Australia | New South Wales Swifts |
| 2017 | Geva Mentor | England | Sunshine Coast Lightning |
| 2018 | Geva Mentor | England | Sunshine Coast Lightning |
| 2019 | Karla Pretorius | South Africa | Sunshine Coast Lightning |
| 2020 | Ameliaranne Ekenasio | New Zealand | Central Pulse |
| 2021 | Jhaniele Fowler | Jamaica | West Coast Fever |
| 2022 | Gretel Bueta | Australia | Queensland Firebirds |
| 2023 | Courtney Bruce | Australia | West Coast Fever |
| 2024 | Latanya Wilson | Jamaica | Adelaide Thunderbirds |
| 2024 | Shamera Sterling-Humphrey | Jamaica | Adelaide Thunderbirds |
| 2025 | Latanya Wilson | Jamaica | Adelaide Thunderbirds |

== Most-capped internationals ==
As of 4 March 2026
| Rank | Caps | Name | Country | Career |
|---|---|---|---|---|
| 1 | 217 | Irene van Dyk | South Africa (72); New Zealand (145) | 1994–2014 |
| 2 | 214 | Jade Clarke | England | 2002–2023 |
| 3 | 203 | Latonia Blackman | Barbados | 1998–2025 |
| 4 | 200+ | Mary Waya | Malawi | 1984–2014 |
| 5 | 175 | Geva Mentor | England | 2001–2023 |
| 6 | 171 | Bongiwe Msomi | South Africa | 2011–2023 |
| 7 | 165 | Laura Langman | New Zealand | 2003–2020 |
| 8 | 159 | Nadine Bryan | Jamaica | 1997–2014 |
| 9 | 150+ | Rhonda John-Davis | Trinidad and Tobago | 1999–2019 |
| 10 | 150 | Maria Folau | New Zealand | 2005–2019 |

== Most individual appearances at the Netball World Cup ==
As of 2 June 2026
| Apps | Name | Country | Career |
|---|---|---|---|
| 6 | Rhonda John-Davis | Trinidad and Tobago | 1999–2019 |
| 6 | Latonia Blackman | Barbados | 1999–2023 |
| 6 | Jade Clarke | England | 2003–2023 |
| 6 | Geva Mentor | England | 2003–2023 |
| 5 | Jean Pierre | Trinidad and Tobago | 1963–1979 |
| 5 | Janet Johnson | Jamaica | 1975–1991 |
| 5 | Elizabeth Rodgers | Northern Ireland | 1975–1991 |
| 5 | Jennifer Franks | Trinidad and Tobago | 1979–1995 |
| 5 | Connie Francis | Jamaica | 1987–2003 |
| 5 | Irene van Dyk | South Africa; New Zealand | 1995–2011 |
| 5 | Leana de Bruin | South Africa; New Zealand | 1999–2015 |
| 4 | Oberon Pitterson | Jamaica | 1991–2003 |
| 4 | Karen Atkinson | England | 1999–2011 |
| 4 | Nadine Bryan | Jamaica | 1999–2011 |
| 4 | Althea Byfield | Jamaica | 1999–2011 |
| 4 | Sonia Mkoloma | England | 1999–2011 |
| 4 | Bongiwe Msomi | South Africa | 2011–2023 |

== See also ==
=== Players by country ===
- List of Australia international netball players
- List of England international netball players
- List of Jamaica international netball players
- List of New Zealand international netball players

=== Team captains ===
- List of Australia national netball team captains

=== Leagues ===
- List of ANZ Championship players

=== Squads and rosters ===
Commonwealth Games

- Netball at the 1998 Commonwealth Games squads
- Netball at the 2002 Commonwealth Games squads
- Netball at the 2006 Commonwealth Games squads
- Netball at the 2018 Commonwealth Games squads

World Cup

- 2011 World Netball Championships squads
- 2019 Netball World Cup squads

=== Medalists ===
- List of Commonwealth Games medallists in netball
- List of Netball World Cup medallists
