= Netball at the 2006 Commonwealth Games squads =

List of netball players at the 2006 Commonwealth Games

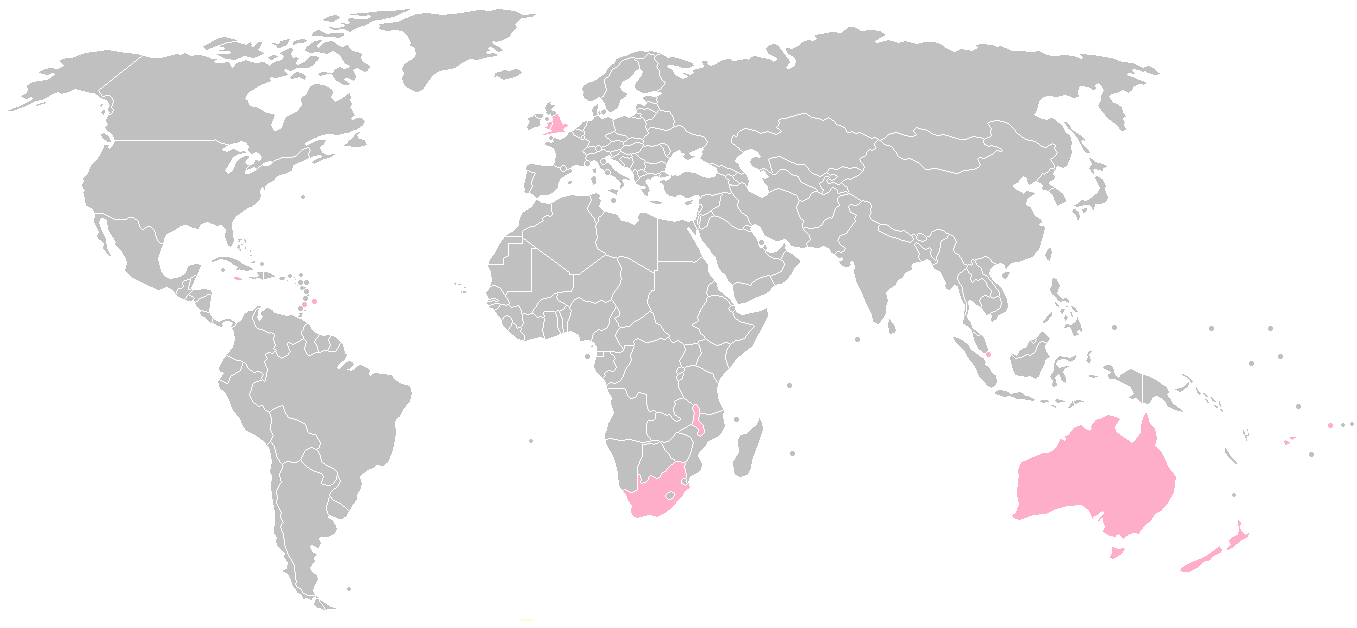
Countries that competed in the 2006 Commonwealth Games netball tournament.

This is a list of netball players at the 2006 Commonwealth Games.

== Pool 1 ==
=== England ===
England roster
Players
Coaches

Name	Pos	DOB	Height	Club	Nat	Caps
Ama Agbeze	GD, GK, WD	12 November 1982 (aged 23)	1.84 m (6 ft 0 in)	Loughborough Lightning
Karen Atkinson	WA, C	7 June 1978 (aged 27)	1.68 m (5 ft 6 in)	Loughborough Lightning
Louisa Brownfield	GA, GS	14 April 1984 (aged 21)	1.91 m (6 ft 3 in)	Hertfordshire Mavericks
Jade Clarke	WD, C, WA	17 October 1983 (aged 27)	1.74 m (5 ft 9 in)	Loughborough Lightning
Pamela Cookey	GA, GS, WA	2 September 1984 (aged 21)	1.78 m (5 ft 10 in)	Team Bath
Rachel Dunn	GS, GA	14 November 1982 (aged 23)	1.87 m (6 ft 2 in)	Team Bath
Chioma Ezeogu	WA	12 March 1981 (aged 25)	1.74 m (5 ft 9 in)	Brunel Hurricanes
Geva Mentor	GK, GD	17 September 1984 (aged 21)	1.88 m (6 ft 2 in)	Team Bath
Sonia Mkoloma	GD, GK	17 January 1979 (aged 27)	1.86 m (6 ft 1 in)	Brunel Hurricanes
Olivia Murphy (c)	C, WA	24 April 1977 (aged 28)	1.74 m (5 ft 9 in)	Loughborough Lightning
Naomi Stenhouse	WD, GD	2 April 1975 (aged 30)	1.82 m (6 ft 0 in)	Hertfordshire Mavericks
Abby Teare	GA, GS	25 May 1977 (aged 28)	1.81 m (5 ft 11 in)	Brunel Hurricanes

Head coach

- Margaret Caldow

Assistant coach

- Maggie Jackson

Notes

- (c) – Captain
- (cc) – Co-captain
- (vc) – Vice-captain
- – Injury / maternity leave
- (TRP) – Temporary Replacement Player

=== Fiji ===
Fiji roster
Players
Coaches

Name	Pos	DOB	Height	Club	Nat	Caps
Maria Bereso	GS, GA	15 August 1983 (aged 22)	1.80 m (5 ft 11 in)	CBM Suva
Ana Erenavula	WA	20 January 1985 (aged 21)	1.70 m (5 ft 7 in)	Wailulu - Nadi
Venina Galuinadi	WD	25 May 1976 (aged 29)	1.76 m (5 ft 9 in)	Taileru - Suva
Mere Rambuka	GK, GD	28 May 1982 (aged 23)	1.82 m (6 ft 0 in)	Credit Corp - Lautoka
Taraima Rara	GS, GA	19 August 1982 (aged 23)	1.86 m (6 ft 1 in)	Grasshoppers (Nasinu)
Anasimeci Ratumaisala	GD, GK	14 April 1975 (aged 30)	1.74 m (5 ft 9 in)	Lomaiviti - Suva
Unaisi Rokoura (cc)	C, WA	7 December 1977 (aged 28)	1.63 m (5 ft 4 in)	CBM Suva
Matelita Shaw	GS, GA	16 October 1979 (aged 26)	1.79 m (5 ft 10 in)	Excelsior - Nasinu
Hannah Tuikoro	C, WA	8 March 1985 (aged 21)	1.79 m (5 ft 10 in)	Tailevu - Suva
Laniana Tuisasa	GS, GA	6 July 1987 (aged 18)	1.79 m (5 ft 10 in)	Nasinu
Mere Tuwai	GD, GK	22 December 1985 (aged 20)	1.82 m (6 ft 0 in)	CBM Suva
Matila Waqanidrola (cc)	GD, GK	31 March 1981 (aged 24)	1.82 m (6 ft 0 in)	Excelsior - Nasinu

Head coach

- Megan Simpson

Assistant coach

- Katarina Toga Ruru

Manager: Asenaca Waqanivavalagi

Notes

- (c) – Captain
- (cc) – Co-captain
- (vc) – Vice-captain
- – Injury / maternity leave
- (TRP) – Temporary Replacement Player

=== Malawi ===
Malawi roster
Players
Coaches

Name	Pos	DOB	Height	Club	Nat	Caps
Peace Chawinga		22 August 1974 (aged 31)	1.66 m (5 ft 5 in)	ADMARC Tigresses
Annie Kapatuka	GK	23 September 1972 (aged 33)	1.70 m (5 ft 7 in)	MTL Queens
Esther Kayira	WD, GK, GD	31 December 1982 (aged 23)	1.70 m (5 ft 7 in)	MTL Queens
Judith Kayira	GD, GK	24 November 1968 (aged 37)	1.70 m (5 ft 7 in)	ADMARC Tigresses
Linda Magombo	GS	22 March 1978 (aged 27)	1.87 m (6 ft 2 in)	ADMARC Tigresses
Slyvia Malenga	WD, C	7 November 1968 (aged 37)	1.57 m (5 ft 2 in)	MTL Queens
Annie Mopiha	WA, C	2 July 1979 (aged 26)	1.53 m (5 ft 0 in)	ADMARC Tigresses
Caroline Mtukule	GD, GK	19 April 1984 (aged 21)	1.80 m (5 ft 11 in)	ADMARC Tigresses
Ziwanji Mtunduwatha	WA, C	30 June 1976 (aged 29)	1.55 m (5 ft 1 in)	Blue Eagles Sisters
Emma Mzagada	GA, GS	12 April 1968 (aged 37)	1.72 m (5 ft 8 in)	MTL Queens
Esther Nkhoma	GK, GD	17 July 1978 (aged 27)	1.70 m (5 ft 7 in)	MTL Queens
Mary Waya (c)	GA, GS, WA	25 May 1968 (aged 37)	1.62 m (5 ft 4 in)	MTL Queens

Head coach

- Griffin Saenda

Notes

- (c) – Captain
- (cc) – Co-captain
- (vc) – Vice-captain
- – Injury / maternity leave
- (TRP) – Temporary Replacement Player

=== New Zealand ===
New Zealand roster
Players
Coaches

Name	Pos	DOB	Height	Club	Nat	Caps
Belinda Colling	GA, GS, WA	12 September 1975 (aged 30)	1.78 m (5 ft 10 in)	Southern Sting
Vilimaina Davu	GK	15 January 1977 (aged 29)	1.90 m (6 ft 3 in)	Canterbury Flames
Leana de Bruin	GD, GK	9 July 1977 (aged 28)	1.90 m (6 ft 3 in)	Northern Force
Temepara George	C, WA	23 October 1975 (aged 30)	1.70 m (5 ft 7 in)	Northern Force
Laura Langman	C, WD	16 April 1986 (aged 19)	1.73 m (5 ft 8 in)	Waikato Bay of Plenty Magic
Anna Rowberry	GD	31 March 1976 (aged 29)	1.76 m (5 ft 9 in)	Auckland Diamonds
Anna Scarlett	GK, GD, WD	15 April 1983 (aged 22)	1.87 m (6 ft 2 in)	Auckland Diamonds
Jessica Tuki	GK, WA	28 October 1987 (aged 18)	1.85 m (6 ft 1 in)	Western Flyers
Maria Tutaia	GA, GS	18 February 1987 (aged 19)	1.88 m (6 ft 2 in)	Auckland Diamonds
Irene van Dyk	GS, GA	21 June 1972 (aged 33)	1.90 m (6 ft 3 in)	Waikato Bay of Plenty Magic
Casey Williams	GD, GK	19 June 1985 (aged 20)	1.88 m (6 ft 2 in)	Waikato Bay of Plenty Magic
Adine Wilson (c)	WA, C, GA	8 June 1979 (aged 26)	1.80 m (5 ft 11 in)	Southern Sting

Head coach

- Ruth Aitken

Notes

- (c) – Captain
- (cc) – Co-captain
- (vc) – Vice-captain
- – Injury / maternity leave
- (TRP) – Temporary Replacement Player

=== Saint Vincent and the Grenadines ===
Saint Vincent and the Grenadines roster
Players
Coaches

Name	Pos	DOB	Height	Club	Nat	Caps
Jacintha Adams	GD	24 June 1973 (aged 32)	1.71 m (5 ft 7 in)
Genella Andrews	WD	12 October 1973 (aged 32)	1.77 m (5 ft 10 in)
Joeana Christopher	GS, GK	12 September 1975 (aged 30)	1.89 m (6 ft 2 in)
Saska Diamond	C	28 May 1986 (aged 19)	1.68 m (5 ft 6 in)
Dellerice Duncan (c)	WA	10 August 1970 (aged 35)	1.65 m (5 ft 5 in)
Galeine Gordon	GS, GA	10 January 1985 (aged 21)	1.56 m (5 ft 1 in)
Marcia Gordon	GK, GD	31 January 1987 (aged 19)	1.55 m (5 ft 1 in)
Annette King	GK, GD	20 July 1976 (aged 29)	1.92 m (6 ft 4 in)
Leeanna Lewis	WD, WA, GA	9 August 1987 (aged 18)	1.77 m (5 ft 10 in)
Annella Samuel	WD	9 August 1987 (aged 18)	1.62 m (5 ft 4 in)
Nicole Sandy	GA, GS	17 July 1979 (aged 26)	1.65 m (5 ft 5 in)
Michelle Wiseman	C	23 September 1975 (aged 30)	1.56 m (5 ft 1 in)

Head coach

- Godfrey Harry

Notes

- (c) – Captain
- (cc) – Co-captain
- (vc) – Vice-captain
- – Injury / maternity leave
- (TRP) – Temporary Replacement Player

=== South Africa ===
South Africa roster
Players
Coaches

Name	Pos	DOB	Height	Club	Nat	Caps
Sindisiwe Gumede	GS, GA	10 March 1980 (aged 26)	1.92 m (6 ft 4 in)	Zululand
Nontle Gwavu	GK	25 September 1984 (aged 21)	1.74 m (5 ft 9 in)	Eastern Province
Lizanne Helmand	GS, GA	17 August 1979 (aged 26)	1.80 m (5 ft 11 in)	Northwest South
Charlene Hertzog (c)	C, WA, WD	17 January 1980 (aged 26)	1.81 m (5 ft 11 in)	Free State
Simnikiwe Malusi	C	17 September 1982 (aged 23)	1.65 m (5 ft 5 in)	Eastern Province
Christine Markgraaff	GS, GA	16 March 1982 (aged 24)	1.83 m (6 ft 0 in)	Boland
Zanele Mdodana	GD, WD	18 February 1984 (aged 22)	1.75 m (5 ft 9 in)	Eastern Province
Nthabiseng Moabi	WA, C, WD	7 June 1982 (aged 23)	1.64 m (5 ft 5 in)	Gauteng Central
Martha Mosoahle	WA	2 June 1979 (aged 26)	1.69 m (5 ft 7 in)	Gauteng Central
Adele Niemand	GK, GD, WD	15 October 1984 (aged 21)	1.81 m (5 ft 11 in)	Free State
Karin Venter	GK, GD	24 February 1979 (aged 27)	1.79 m (5 ft 10 in)	Free State
Leigh-Ann Zackey	GD	14 August 1982 (aged 23)	1.79 m (5 ft 10 in)	Central Gauteng

Head coach

- Marlene Wagner

Notes

- (c) – Captain
- (cc) – Co-captain
- (vc) – Vice-captain
- – Injury / maternity leave
- (TRP) – Temporary Replacement Player

== Pool 2 ==
=== Australia ===
Australia national netball team – 2006 Commonwealth Games roster
Players
Coaches

Pos.	Name	Age - DOB	Ht.	Club	Club nat.
Natalie Avellino	WA, GA, GS	15 December 1970 (aged 35)	1.77 m (5 ft 10 in)	Adelaide Thunderbirds	(Australia)	20
Alison Broadbent	GD, GK, WD	18 July 1975 (aged 30)	1.81 m (5 ft 11 in)	Sydney Swifts	(Australia)	28
Bianca Chatfield	GK, GD	2 April 1982 (aged 23)	1.88 m (6 ft 2 in)	Melbourne Phoenix	(Australia)	16
Catherine Cox (vc)	GS, GA	24 May 1976 (aged 29)	1.88 m (6 ft 2 in)	Sydney Swifts	(Australia)	50
Megan Dehn	GA, GS, WA	9 November 1974 (aged 31)	1.78 m (5 ft 10 in)	Sydney Swifts	(Australia)	15
Susan Fuhrmann	GK	30 July 1986 (aged 19)	1.96 m (6 ft 5 in)	AIS Canberra Darters	(Australia)	0
Selina Gilsenan	WD, C, WA	31 May 1978 (aged 27)	1.71 m (5 ft 7 in)	Sydney Swifts	(Australia)	6
Janine Ilitch	GK, GD	27 January 1972 (aged 34)	1.84 m (6 ft 0 in)	Melbourne Kestrels	(Australia)	44
Sharelle McMahon (c)	GA, GS	12 August 1977 (aged 28)	1.77 m (5 ft 10 in)	Melbourne Phoenix	(Australia)	72
Susan Pratley	GA, GS	23 March 1984 (aged 21)	1.80 m (5 ft 11 in)	AIS Canberra Darters	(Australia)	0
Jessica Shynn	C, WD	20 August 1982 (aged 23)	1.79 m (5 ft 10 in)	Perth Orioles	(Australia)	15
Natalie von Bertouch	C, WA	16 December 1982 (aged 23)	1.75 m (5 ft 9 in)	Adelaide Thunderbirds	(Australia)	9

Head coach

- Norma Plummer

Assistant coach

- Jane Searle

Manager:
Marg Molina
Physiotherapist:
Wayne Rodgers
Team Doctor:
Dr. Lyn Thew

Notes

- (c) – Captain
- (cc) – Co-captain
- (vc) – Vice-captain
- – Injury / maternity leave
- (TRP) – Temporary Replacement Player

=== Barbados ===
Barbados roster
Players
Coaches

Pos.	Name	Age - DOB	Ht.	Club	Club nat.
Wanda Agard-Belgrave	GK	8 December 1978 (aged 27)	1.85 m (6 ft 1 in)	Advil Rockers
Denese Alleyne (vc)	GA, GS	24 June 1976 (aged 29)	1.78 m (5 ft 10 in)	St Barnabas
Lydia Bishop	GS, GA	1 August 1974 (aged 31)	1.75 m (5 ft 9 in)	Spooners Hill
Latonia Blackman	WD, GD, GK	6 October 1982 (aged 23)	1.77 m (5 ft 10 in)	Pride of Villa
Jacqueline Browne	GD	25 May 1969 (aged 36)	1.78 m (5 ft 10 in)	St Barnabas
Laurel Browne	GS, GK	2 August 1976 (aged 29)	1.89 m (6 ft 2 in)	Silver Raiders
Samantha Browne	WD	3 July 1989 (aged 16)	1.72 m (5 ft 8 in)	St Barnabas
Alicia Harding	WD, GD, GK	20 December 1984 (aged 21)	1.73 m (5 ft 8 in)	St Barnabas
Irecka Louis	WD	30 July 1981 (aged 24)	1.72 m (5 ft 8 in)	Advil Rockers
Julie Phillips (c)	WA, WD	17 December 1972 (aged 33)	1.72 m (5 ft 8 in)	St. Barnabas
Janelle Sealy	GD	19 February 1985 (aged 21)	1.69 m (5 ft 7 in)	UWI Eagles
Chekirah Shepherd	WA, C	26 September 1987 (aged 18)	1.75 m (5 ft 9 in)	Banks Spurs

Head coach

- Anna Shepherd

Assistant coach

- Maureen Bourne

Manager:
Vaneisha Cadogan
Team Doctor:
Llewyn Harper

Notes

- (c) – Captain
- (cc) – Co-captain
- (vc) – Vice-captain
- – Injury / maternity leave
- (TRP) – Temporary Replacement Player

=== Jamaica ===
Jamaica roster
Players
Coaches

Name	Pos	DOB	Height	Club	Nat	Caps
Nicole Aiken	GA, GD	11 December 1985 (aged 20)	1.87 m (6 ft 2 in)	Jamalco
Nadine Bryan	C, WA	18 December 1976 (aged 29)	1.65 m (5 ft 5 in)	Jamalco
Marion Campbell	C, WA	24 March 1984 (aged 21)	1.73 m (5 ft 8 in)	Tivoli Gardens
Elaine Davis (c)	GS, GK	21 September 1976 (aged 29)	1.90 m (6 ft 3 in)	Jamalco
Kasey Evering	GK, GS, WD	14 February 1983 (aged 23)	1.85 m (6 ft 1 in)	Tivoli Gardens
Jodi Ann Ffrench	GS, GA	23 July 1984 (aged 21)	1.75 m (5 ft 9 in)	Seneca
Simone Forbes	WD, C, GA	20 June 1981 (aged 24)	1.73 m (5 ft 8 in)	Waulgrovians
Nichala Gibson	WD, GD	20 October 1982 (aged 23)	1.72 m (5 ft 8 in)	Waulgrovians
Tamara Hylton	C, WA	24 April 1982 (aged 23)	1.72 m (5 ft 8 in)	Waulgrovians
Oberon Pitterson	GK, GD, WD	8 February 1971 (aged 35)	1.80 m (5 ft 11 in)	Waulgrovians
Latoya Thomas	GA, GS	8 November 1985 (aged 20)	1.85 m (6 ft 1 in)	Alpha
Peter-Gaye Thomas	C	9 April 1986 (aged 19)	1.73 m (5 ft 8 in)	Tivoli Gardens

Head coach

- Maureen Hall

Assistant coach

- Yvonne Keane-Dawes

Notes

- (c) – Captain
- (cc) – Co-captain
- (vc) – Vice-captain
- – Injury / maternity leave
- (TRP) – Temporary Replacement Player

=== Samoa ===
Samoa roster
Players
Coaches

Name	Pos	DOB	Height	Club	Nat	Caps
Malu Fa'asavalu	GA, GS	11 June 1984 (aged 21)	1.80 m (5 ft 11 in)	Baytex Panthers
Monika Fuimaono	GA, GS	2 May 1977 (aged 28)	1.93 m (6 ft 4 in)
Opheira Harder	WD	29 March 1976 (aged 29)	1.78 m (5 ft 10 in)
Aloma Inu	WA	6 September 1986 (aged 19)	1.75 m (5 ft 9 in)
Cathrine Latu	GS, GA	25 October 1986 (aged 19)	1.91 m (6 ft 3 in)	Northern Force
Akenehe Pereira	C, WA	21 July 1981 (aged 24)	1.68 m (5 ft 6 in)
Frances Solia (c)	C, WA	20 September 1976 (aged 29)	1.68 m (5 ft 6 in)	Canterbury Flames
Geradine Solia	GD	16 October 1983 (aged 22)	1.64 m (5 ft 5 in)	Capital Shakers
Lorna Suafoa (vc)	GK, GD	7 October 1975 (aged 30)	1.86 m (6 ft 1 in)	Northern Force
Monalisa Tofilau	GD, GK	4 June 1981 (aged 24)	1.83 m (6 ft 0 in)	St Mary's Old Girls Association
Ida Vaai	GA, GS	20 August 1986 (aged 19)	1.75 m (5 ft 9 in)	Black Cats
Brooke Williams	C, WA	23 December 1982 (aged 23)	1.73 m (5 ft 8 in)	Baytex Panthers

Head coach

- Linda Vagana

Notes

- (c) – Captain
- (cc) – Co-captain
- (vc) – Vice-captain
- – Injury / maternity leave
- (TRP) – Temporary Replacement Player

=== Singapore ===
Singapore roster
Players
Coaches

Name	Pos	DOB	Height	Club	Nat	Caps
Pearline Chan (c)	C, WA	21 August 1979 (aged 26)	1.67 m (5 ft 6 in)	Nike
Chen Hui Fen	GA, GS	11 March 1985 (aged 21)	1.69 m (5 ft 7 in)	Blaze
Jeanine Heng	GS, GA	20 January 1979 (aged 27)	1.78 m (5 ft 10 in)	Sneakers
Premila Hirubalan	GD, GK	17 August 1982 (aged 23)	1.70 m (5 ft 7 in)	Nike
Vanessa Lee		24 November 1983 (aged 22)	–
Li Ling	GS, GA	26 December 1987 (aged 18)	1.88 m (6 ft 2 in)	Blaze
Lin Qingyi	GK, GD	24 June 1985 (aged 20)	1.73 m (5 ft 8 in)	Blaze
Puay Loo	C	(aged 27)	1.64 m (5 ft 5 in)
Jean Ng	GD, GK	21 March 1978 (aged 27)	1.75 m (5 ft 9 in)	Nike
Grace Sim	WD, C	6 November 1985 (aged 20)	1.69 m (5 ft 7 in)	Nike
Tan Hui Yan	GA, GS	16 November 1982 (aged 23)	1.69 m (5 ft 7 in)	Blaze
Wendy Tan	WA	24 November 1978 (aged 27)	1.64 m (5 ft 5 in)	Nike
Zhang Ting Jun	WD, GD	27 August 1982 (aged 23)	1.77 m (5 ft 10 in)	Sneakers

Head coach

- Kate Carpenter

Assistant coach

- Yeo Mee Hong

Manager: Vicki Woo

Notes

- (c) – Captain
- (cc) – Co-captain
- (vc) – Vice-captain
- – Injury / maternity leave
- (TRP) – Temporary Replacement Player

=== Wales ===
Wales roster
Players
Coaches

Name	Pos	DOB	Height	Club	Nat	Caps
Jamilla Abbott	GS, GA	27 August 1979 (aged 26)	1.88 m (6 ft 2 in)	Celtic Dragons
Rhiannon Ace	GA, WA	13 April 1979 (aged 26)	1.65 m (5 ft 5 in)	Celtic Dragons
Sophie Baxter	WA, C	10 May 1986 (aged 19)	1.68 m (5 ft 6 in)	Team Bath
Ursula Bowers (c)	WD, GD, GK, C	29 June 1978 (aged 27)	1.81 m (5 ft 11 in)	Team Bath
Suzy Drane	C, WA	27 November 1986 (aged 19)	1.72 m (5 ft 8 in)	Celtic Dragons
Amanda Evans	GA, WA	23 August 1984 (aged 21)	1.70 m (5 ft 7 in)	Celtic Dragons
Sara Hale	GD, WD	7 October 1982 (aged 23)	1.76 m (5 ft 9 in)	Celtic Dragons
Lynda James	GK, GD	26 January 1977 (aged 29)	1.83 m (6 ft 0 in)	Celtic Dragons
Rebecca James	GS, GA	26 June 1985 (aged 20)	1.82 m (6 ft 0 in)	Loughborough Lightning
Nicola Lewis	GS, GA	9 February 1977 (aged 29)	1.78 m (5 ft 10 in)	Celtic Dragons
Anna Mayes	WA, C	8 February 1981 (aged 25)	1.65 m (5 ft 5 in)	Celtic Dragons
Nicola Szehofner	GD, GK	26 August 1984 (aged 21)	1.78 m (5 ft 10 in)	Celtic Dragons

Head coach

- Julia Longville

Assistant coach

- Caroline Morgan

Manager: Alison Dacey

Notes

- (c) – Captain
- (cc) – Co-captain
- (vc) – Vice-captain
- – Injury / maternity leave
- (TRP) – Temporary Replacement Player
