= Athletics at the 2018 Commonwealth Games – Women's 100 metres hurdles =

Women's 100 metres hurdles at the 2018 Commonwealth Games
- Venue: Carrara Stadium
- Dates: 12 April (heats); 13 April (final)
- Competitors: 14 from 9 nations
- Winning time: 12.68

Medalists
gold medal	Oluwatobiloba Amusan	Nigeria
silver medal	Danielle Williams	Jamaica
bronze medal	Yanique Thompson	Jamaica

The women's 100 metres hurdles at the 2018 Commonwealth Games, as part of the athletics programme, took place in the Carrara Stadium on 12 and 13 April 2018.

== Records ==
Prior to this competition, the existing world and Games records were as follows:

World record	Kendra Harrison (USA)	12.20	London, United Kingdom	22 July 2016
Games record	Brigitte Foster-Hylton (JAM)	12.65	Melbourne, Australia	23 March 2006

== Schedule ==
The schedule was as follows:

Date	Time	Round
Thursday 12 April 2018	11:20	First round
Friday 13 April 2018	22:09	Final

All times are Australian Eastern Standard Time (UTC+10)

== Results ==
=== First round ===
The first round consisted of two heats. The three fastest competitors per heat (plus two fastest losers) advanced to the final.

Heat 1

Rank	Lane	Name	Reaction Time	Result	Notes	Qual.
1	2	Oluwatobiloba Amusan (NGR)	0.152	12.73		Q
2	6	Brianna Beahan (AUS)	0.135	13.02	=PB	Q
3	5	Megan Simmonds (JAM)	0.175	13.17		Q
4	3	Alicia Barrett (ENG)	0.192	13.19		q
5	4	Natalia Christofi (CYP)	0.140	13.66		
6	8	Caryl Granville (WAL)	0.222	13.98		
7	7	Priscilla Tabunda (KEN)	0.186	14.18	SB	
				Wind: +0.4 m/s		

Heat 2

Rank	Lane	Name	Reaction Time	Result	Notes	Qual.
1	4	Danielle Williams (JAM)	0.136	12.69		Q
2	2	Yanique Thompson (JAM)	0.150	12.95		Q
3	3	Tiffany Porter (ENG)	0.138	12.99		Q
4	5	Michelle Jenneke (AUS)	0.140	12.99	SB	q
5	6	Grace Ayemoba (NGR)	0.150	13.59		
6	7	Kierre Beckles (BAR)	0.161	13.64		
7	8	Adrine Monagi (PNG)	0.175	13.92		
				Wind: +0.8 m/s		

=== Final ===
The medals were determined in the final.

Rank	Lane	Name	Reaction Time	Result	Notes
1st place, gold medalist(s)	7	Oluwatobiloba Amusan (NGR)	0.136	12.68	
2nd place, silver medalist(s)	4	Danielle Williams (JAM)	0.137	12.78	
3rd place, bronze medalist(s)	6	Yanique Thompson (JAM)	0.143	12.97	
4	2	Michelle Jenneke (AUS)	0.143	13.07	
5	5	Brianna Beahan (AUS)	0.149	13.11	
6	9	Tiffany Porter (ENG)	0.146	13.12	
7	8	Megan Simmonds (JAM)	0.156	13.18	
8	3	Alicia Barrett (ENG)	0.194	13.64	
				Wind: +0.2 m/s	
