= Athletics at the 2018 Commonwealth Games – Men's 110 metres hurdles =

Men's 110 metres hurdles at the 2018 Commonwealth Games
- Venue: Carrara Stadium
- Dates: 9 April (heats); 10 April (final)
- Competitors: 17 from 14 nations
- Winning time: 13.19

Medalists
| gold medal | Ronald Levy | Jamaica |
| silver medal | Hansle Parchment | Jamaica |
| bronze medal | Nicholas Hough | Australia |

The men's 110 metres hurdles at the 2018 Commonwealth Games, as part of the athletics programme, took place in the Carrara Stadium on 9 and 10 April 2018.

Ronald Levy's victory was his first international podium finish, as he held off his more decorated compatriot Hansle Parchment to succeed Andrew Riley (another Jamaica) as the Commonwealth Games champion. Andrew Pozzi – 2018 world indoor champion and the fastest qualifier in the first round – struggled after striking the first hurdle in the final and finished sixth.

== Records ==
Prior to this competition, the existing world and Games records were as follows:

| World record | Aries Merritt (USA) | 12.80 | Brussels, Belgium | 7 September 2012 |
| Games record | Colin Jackson (WAL) | 13.08 | Auckland, New Zealand | 28 January 1990 |
| Games record | Colin Jackson (WAL) | 13.08 | Victoria, Canada | 23 August 1994 |

== Schedule ==
The schedule was as follows:

| Date | Time | Round |
|---|---|---|
| Monday 9 April 2018 | 11:30 | First round |
| Tuesday 10 April 2018 | 19:45 | Final |

All times are Australian Eastern Standard Time (UTC+10)

== Results ==
=== First round ===
The first round consisted of two heats. The three fastest competitors per heat (plus two fastest losers) advanced to the final.

Heat 1

| Rank | Lane | Name | Reaction Time | Result | Notes | Qual. |
|---|---|---|---|---|---|---|
| 1 | 7 | Andrew Pozzi (ENG) | 0.128 | 13.29 | | Q |
| 2 | 3 | Antonio Alkana (RSA) | 0.127 | 13.32 | | Q |
| 3 | 8 | Nicholas Hough (AUS) | 0.164 | 13.46 | | Q |
| 4 | 2 | Dejour Russell (JAM) | 0.168 | 13.64 | | q |
| 5 | 9 | Shane Brathwaite (BAR) | 0.149 | 13.64 | | q |
| 6 | 5 | Ronald Forbes (CAY) | 0.141 | 13.88 | | |
| 7 | 4 | Oyeniyi Abejoye (NGR) | 0.160 | 14.10 | | |
| 8 | 6 | Kiprono Koskei (KEN) | 0.168 | 15.00 | | |
| | | | | Wind: +0.7 m/s | | |

Heat 2

| Rank | Lane | Name | Reaction Time | Result | Notes | Qual. |
|---|---|---|---|---|---|---|
| 1 | 6 | Hansle Parchment (JAM) | 0.162 | 13.30 | | Q |
| 2 | 1 | Ronald Levy (JAM) | 0.155 | 13.35 | | Q |
| 3 | 8 | Milan Trajkovic (CYP) | 0.161 | 13.36 | | Q |
| 4 | 7 | Ben Reynolds (NIR) | 0.154 | 13.70 | | |
| 5 | 3 | David King (ENG) | 0.160 | 13.74 | | |
| 6 | 2 | Syazwan Zulkifly (MAS) | 0.142 | 14.03 | | |
| 7 | 9 | David Omoregie (WAL) | 0.160 | 14.20 | | |
| 8 | 5 | Talatala Pooi (TGA) | 0.149 | 15.02 | | |
| 9 | 4 | Kolone Alefosio (SAM) | 0.139 | 15.10 | PB | |
| | | | | Wind: +2.0 m/s | | |

=== Final ===
The medals were determined in the final.

| Rank | Lane | Name | Reaction Time | Result | Notes |
|---|---|---|---|---|---|
| 1st place, gold medalist(s) | 7 | Ronald Levy (JAM) | 0.126 | 13.19 | |
| 2nd place, silver medalist(s) | 5 | Hansle Parchment (JAM) | 0.144 | 13.22 | |
| 3rd place, bronze medalist(s) | 9 | Nicholas Hough (AUS) | 0.142 | 13.38 | PB |
| 4 | 8 | Milan Trajkovic (CYP) | 0.145 | 13.42 | |
| 5 | 6 | Antonio Alkana (RSA) | 0.120 | 13.49 | |
| 6 | 2 | Shane Brathwaite (BAR) | 0.143 | 13.53 | |
| 6 | 4 | Andrew Pozzi (ENG) | 0.124 | 13.53 | |
| 8 | 3 | Dejour Russell (JAM) | 0.155 | 13.92 | |
| | | | | Wind: -0.3 m/s | |
