= Ronald Levy (athlete) =

Jamaican hurdler (born 1992)

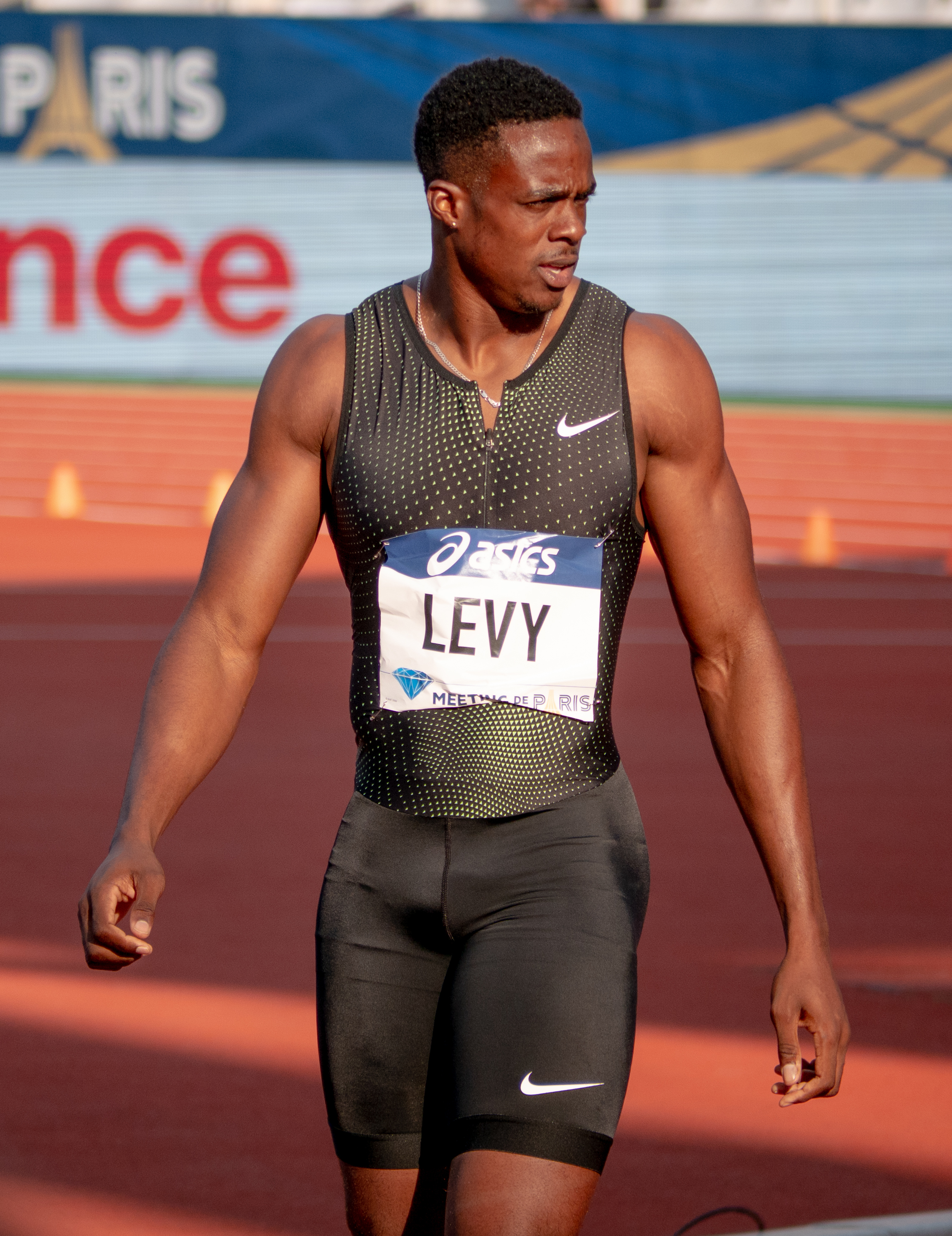
- Levy in 2018

Personal information
- Nationality: Jamaican
- Born: 30 October 1992 (age 33) Westmoreland Parish, Jamaica
- Height: 168 cm (5 ft 6 in)
- Weight: 83 kg (183 lb)

Sport
- Sport: Athletics
- Event: 110 metres hurdles
- College team: University of Technology, Jamaica
- Club: MVP
- Coached by: Stephen Francis; Brigitte Foster-Hylton

Achievements and titles
- Personal best: 110 m hurdles: 13.05
Medal record
Representing Jamaica
Men's athletics
Olympic Games
Bronze medal – third place	2020 Tokyo	110 m hurdles
Commonwealth Games
Gold medal – first place	2018 Gold Coast	110 m hurdles
Continental Cup
Silver medal – second place	2018 Ostrava	110 m hurdles
Diamond League
Second place	2021 Zurich	110 mh
Second place	2019 Brussels	110 mh

Ronald Levy (born 30 October 1992) is a Jamaican male track and field athlete who competes in the 110 metres hurdles. He holds a personal best of 13.05 seconds for that event, set in 2017, as well as a 100 metres sprint best of 10.17 seconds. He was the gold medallist at the 2018 Commonwealth Games and a bronze medallist at the 2020 Tokyo Olympic Games.

== Career ==
Born in Westmoreland Parish, he went on to study at the University of Technology, Jamaica. He took time to develop as an elite athlete, initially competing in a variety of sprint and hurdles events. In the 2014 season, he ran a best of 20.81 seconds for the 200 metres, showing his flat speed. He gradually improved his time in the 110 m hurdles, running 13.63 seconds in 2015 and 13.50 in 2016.

A significant breakthrough came in the 2017 season under the coaching of Stephen Francis and Brigitte Foster-Hylton. He defeated Olympic medallist Hansle Parchment at the UTech Classic before winning at the Penn Relays in a new best of 13.33 seconds. On his IAAF Diamond League debut he was runner-up to Olympic champion Omar McLeod at the Prefontaine Classic – his time of 13.10 seconds ranked him second in the world behind his compatriot. He was runner-up to McLeod at the Jamaican Athletics Championships in June, then overhauled his rival to win at the Meeting de Paris Diamond League, establishing himself among the world's best with a time of 13.05 seconds. Another win followed at the Meeting Città di Padova, but at the 2017 World Championships in Athletics he failed at the first hurdle in the heats and withdrew.

He had his first indoor hurdles appearances in 2018 and, after a win at the Glasgow Indoor Grand Prix, he managed to reach the 60 metres hurdles semi-finals at the 2018 IAAF World Indoor Championships, narrowly missing out on qualification for the final by one hundredth of a second. He achieved his first international medal at the age of 25, taking gold at the Commonwealth Games in a Jamaican 1–2 with Hansle Parchment.

In June 2021, Levy won the Jamaican Olympic trials with a time of 13.10 (+0.6 m/s) ahead of Damion Thomas, to qualify for the delayed 2020 Summer Olympics. In the final of the 110 m hurdles at the Olympic Games he won the bronze medal with a time of 13.10, finishing behind Hansle Parchment and Grant Holloway.

In November 2023, Levy tested positive for GW501516 which is a banned substance under anti-doping rules. Levy was subsequently issued with a four-year ban by the Jamaica Anti-Doping Commission to run to 2027.

== Personal bests ==
- 60 metres – 6.62 (2016)
- 100 metres – 10.17 (2017)
- 200 metres – 20.81 (2014)
- 60 metres hurdles – 7.49 (2017)
- 110 metres hurdles – 13.05 (2017)

== International competitions ==
Year	Competition	Venue	Position	Event	Notes
2017	World Championships	London, United Kingdom	—	110 m hurdles	DNF
2018	World Indoor Championships	Birmingham, United Kingdom	9th (sf)	60 m hurdles	7.62
2018	Commonwealth Games	Gold Coast, Australia	1st	110 m hurdles	13.19
2019	World Championships	Doha, Qatar	14th (h)	110 m hurdles	13.48^{1}
2021	Olympic Games	Tokyo, Japan	3rd	110 m hurdles	13.10
2022	World Indoor Championships	Belgrade, Serbia	26th (h)	60 m hurdles	7.75

^{1}Disqualified in the semifinals
