= Sasher-Gaye Henry =

Jamaican netball player and coach

Personal information
- Born: 9 November 1979 (age 47) Saint Andrew Parish, Jamaica
- Height: 1.71 m (5 ft 7 in)
- School: St Hugh's High School

Netball career
- Playing positions: WA, WD
Years	Club team	Apps
1992–199x	Police Nationals	
2014–2015	St James Sharpes	
Years	National team	Caps
1996–2015	Jamaica	75
Coaching career
- Years: Team
- 2017–2018: Jamaica
- 2024–: Jamaica
Medal record
Representing Jamaica
World Netball Championships
Bronze medal – third place	2007 Auckland	Team
Commonwealth Games
Bronze medal – third place	2014 Glasgow	Team
World Netball Series
Silver medal – second place	2009 Manchester	Team
World Youth Netball Championships
Silver medal – second place	2000 Cardiff	Team

Sasher-Gaye Henry (born 9 November 1979) is a former Jamaica netball international and the current Jamaica national netball team head coach. As a player, she was a member of the Jamaica teams that were bronze medallists at the 2007 World Netball Championships and 2014 Commonwealth Games. Henry also represented Jamaica at the 2010 Commonwealth Games, the 2011 World Netball Championships and the 2015 Netball World Cup. Between 2017 and 2018, during her first spell as national team head coach, Henry guided Jamaica as they won the 2018 Taini Jamison Trophy Series and finished as bronze medallists at the 2018 Commonwealth Games. In January 2024, she was reappointed national team head coach

== Early life, education and employment ==
Henry attended St Hugh's High School. Henry worked as a physical education teacher and netball coach at Mona High School and as part-time coach at the University of Technology (UTech) and St Hugh's High School.

== Playing career ==
=== Police Nationals ===
While still attending St Hugh's High School, aged 13, Henry started playing netball with the Police Nationals.

=== St James Sharpes ===
In 2014 and 2015, Henry captained and played for St James Sharpes in the Berger Elite League.

=== Jamaica ===
Between 1996 and 2015, Henry played for Jamaica. In November 1996, aged just 16, she made her senior debut for Jamaica against England. She was subsequently a member of the Jamaica teams that were bronze medallists at the 2007 World Netball Championships and 2014 Commonwealth Games. Henry also represented Jamaica at the 2010 Commonwealth Games, the 2011 World Netball Championships and the 2015 Netball World Cup.

Tournaments	Place
1996 World Youth Netball Championships	5th
1997 AFNA Championship	1st
2000 World Youth Netball Championships	2nd place, silver medalist(s)
2007 World Netball Championships	3rd place, bronze medalist(s)
2009 World Netball Series	2nd
2010 Taini Jamison Trophy Series	2nd
2010 Commonwealth Games	4th
2010 World Netball Series	3rd
2011 World Netball Championships	4th
2014 Commonwealth Games	3rd place, bronze medalist(s)
2015 Netball World Cup	4th

== Coaching career ==
=== Jamaica ===
Between 2017 and 2018, along with Marvette Anderson, Henry served as co-head coach of Jamaica. Henry and Anderson were initially appointed as interim coaches after the resignation of previous coach, Jermaine Allison-McCracken. Henry had served as Allison-McCracken's assistant. During her first spell as national team head coach, Henry guided Jamaica as they won the 2018 Taini Jamison Trophy Series and finished as bronze medallists at the 2018 Commonwealth Games. In January 2024, Henry was reappointed national team head coach.

Tournaments	Place
2017 Fast5 Netball World Series	2nd
2018 Taini Jamison Trophy Series	1st
2018 Commonwealth Games	3rd place, bronze medalist(s)

== Honours ==
=== Playing career ===
Jamaica

- Taini Jamison Trophy
  - Runners Up: 2010
- Fast5 Netball World Series
  - Runners up: 2009
- AFNA Championships
  - Winners: 1997
- World Youth Netball Championships
  - Runners up: 2000

=== Coaching career ===
Jamaica

- Taini Jamison Trophy
  - Winners: 2018
- Fast5 Netball World Series
  - Runners up: 2017
