= Malysha Kelly =

Jamaica netball international

Personal information
- Full name: Malysha Elizabeth Kelly
- Born: 14 January 1990 (age 36) Saint Catherine Parish, Jamaica
- Height: 1.85 m (6 ft 1 in)
- School: Dinthill Technical High School
- University: University of the West Indies

Netball career
- Playing positions: GD, GK
Years	Club team	Apps
2010–2013	UWI Pelicans	
2014–2015	St Catherine Racers	
2016	Manchester Thunder	
2017	Adelaide Thunderbirds	
2017	→ Southern Force	
2018	Southern Steel	
2021	Severn Stars	
Years	National team	Caps
2008–2023	Jamaica	
Medal record
Representing Jamaica
World University Netball Championship
Silver medal – second place	2016 Miami	Team
Bronze medal – third place	2012 Cape Town	Team
Fast5 Netball World Series
Silver medal – second place	2009 Manchester	Team
Silver medal – second place	2017 Melbourne	Team
Bronze medal – third place	2010 Liverpool	Team
Bronze medal – third place	2013 Auckland	Team
Commonwealth Games
Bronze medal – third place	2014 Glasgow	Team

Malysha Kelly (born 14 January 1990) is a former Jamaica netball international. She was a member of the Jamaica team that were bronze medallists at the 2014 Commonwealth Games. She also represented Jamaica at the 2011 World Netball Championships. She captained Jamaica at the 2013 Fast5 Netball World Series and 2016 Taini Jamison Trophy Series. She has also played for Manchester Thunder and Severn Stars in the Netball Superleague and for Adelaide Thunderbirds in the 2017 Suncorp Super Netball season.

== Early life and education ==
Kelly was born in Saint Catherine Parish. She attended Dinthill Technical High School. Between 2010 and 2016, she attended the University of the West Indies where she gained a Bachelor of Arts in International Relations and a Master's degree in Business Management.

== Playing career ==
=== UWI Pelicans ===
Between 2010 and 2013, while attending the University of the West Indies, Kelly played for UWI Pelicans. She represented UWI Pelicans in the Jamaica Netball Association's Open League and in Intercollegiate competitions. In September 2014, she helped Pelicans reclaim the UWI/UTech Games title with a win over UTech. Her teammates at UWI Pelicans included Nadine Bryan.

=== St Catherine Racers ===
In 2014 and 2015, Kelly played for St Catherine Racers in the Berger Elite League. While playing for Racers, she picked up a knee injury that resulted in her missing the 2015 Netball World Cup.

=== Manchester Thunder ===
During the 2016 Netball Superleague season, Kelly played for Manchester Thunder. She was a member of the Thunder team that played in the 2016 Netball Superleague Grand Final, finishing as runners up to Surrey Storm.

=== Adelaide Thunderbirds ===
During the 2017 Suncorp Super Netball season, Kelly played for Adelaide Thunderbirds. On 19 February 2017, Kelly made her senior debut for Thunderbirds against West Coast Fever. During her time with Thunderbirds, Kelly also played for their reserve team, Southern Force.

=== Southern Steel ===
Ahead of the 2018 ANZ Premiership season, Kelly signed for Southern Steel. However, in March 2018, she suffered an ACL injury in her left knee. She had successful surgery in April 2018, but suffered a re-rupture four months into her recovery, which led to a second corrective procedure. She was out injured for over twenty months.

=== Severn Stars ===
During the 2021 Netball Superleague season, Kelly played for Severn Stars.

=== Jamaica ===
Kelly made her senior debut for Jamaica at the 2008 AFNA Championships. In 2005 and 2006, she had represented Jamaica at under-16 level. In 2009, she was a member of the Jamaica team at the 2009 World Youth Netball Championship. Between 2009 and 2017, she was a prominent member of Jamaica's Fastnet/Fast5 teams, making over 35 appearances. She also represented Jamaica at the 2011 World Netball Championships. She was also a member of the Jamaica teams that medalled at the 2012 and 2016 World University Netball Championships. She was also a member of the Jamaica team that were bronze medallists at the 2014 Commonwealth Games. She captained Jamaica at the 2013 Fast5 Netball World Series, during a 2014 away series against England, and at the 2016 Taini Jamison Trophy Series. In 2020, after recovering from injury, Kelly was recalled to the Jamacia squad.

Tournaments	Place
2008 AFNA Championships	1st
2009 World Youth Netball Championship	4th
2009 World Netball Series	2nd place, silver medalist(s)
2010 Taini Jamison Trophy Series	2nd
2010 World Netball Series	3rd place, bronze medalist(s)
2011 World Netball Championships	4th
2011 World Netball Series	4th
2012 World University Netball Championship	3rd place, bronze medalist(s)
2012 AFNA Championships	1st
2012 Fast5 Netball World Series	4th
2013 Fast5 Netball World Series	3rd place, bronze medalist(s)
2014 Commonwealth Games	3rd place, bronze medalist(s)
2014 Fast5 Netball World Series	4th
2016 World University Netball Championship	2nd place, silver medalist(s)
2016 Taini Jamison Trophy Series	2nd
2017 Fast5 Netball World Series	2nd place, silver medalist(s)
2021 England Jamaica netball series	2nd
2023 England Jamaica netball series	2nd

== Honours ==
Jamaica

- AFNA Championships
  - Winners: 2008, 2012
- Taini Jamison Trophy
  - Runners Up: 2010, 2016
- Fast5 Netball World Series
  - Runners up: 2009, 2017
