= Janine Ilitch =

Australian netball player (born 1972)

Personal information
- Full name: Janine Claire Ilitch (Née: Lynch)
- Born: 27 January 1972 (age 54) Mordialloc
- Height: 1.83 m (6 ft 0 in)
- University: Monash University

Netball career
- Playing positions: GD, GK
Years	Club team	Apps
Years	National team	Caps
1995–2006	Australia	51
Medal record
Representing Australia
Commonwealth Games
Silver medal – second place	2006 Melbourne	Netball
Gold medal – first place	2002 Manchester	Netball
Gold medal – first place	1998 Kuala Lumpur	Netball
Netball World Championships
Silver medal – second place	2003 Kingston	Netball
Gold medal – first place	1999 Christchurch	Netball
- Updated on 2009-03-20

Janine Claire Ilitch (née Lynch; born 27 January 1972) is an Australian netball player. She was an Australian Institute of Sport scholarship holder in 1993.

Ilitch was born in Mordialloc, Victoria. She has been a frequent member of the Australian national team, playing in her usual positions of goal keeper and goal defence, since being first selected in 1995. Ilitch has also been a key member of the Melbourne Kestrels in the Commonwealth Bank Trophy ever since the competition's founding in 1997, and served a stint as captain in 2004.

After years of playing second-fiddle to accomplished defenders Kathryn Harby-Williams and Liz Ellis, Ilitch finally cracked the Australian starting-seven in November 2004, where her combination with Australian captain Ellis played a major role in Australia's series victory against New Zealand. This combination was never to reach its true potential, when Ilitch took the 2005 season off due to being pregnant with her second child, and Ellis withdrew from the Australian team with a knee injury upon Ilitch's return. Ilitch won a place in Australia's silver-winning Commonwealth games team in 2006. After playing limited games with the Melbourne Kestrels in the 2006 Commonwealth Bank Trophy season, Ilitch announced her retirement.
