= Lorna Suafoa =

New Zealand netball player

Personal information
- Born: 7 October 1975 (age 50) Auckland, New Zealand
- Height: 1.83 m (6 ft 0 in)

Netball career
Years	National team	Caps
1998 1998	New Zealand; Samoa	
Medal record
Representing New Zealand
Commonwealth Games
Silver medal – second place	1998 Kuala Lumpur	Netball

Lorna Tomasone Suafoa (born 7 October 1975 in Auckland, New Zealand) is a former New Zealand international netball representative, who played in the Silver Ferns team that won a silver medal at the 1998 Commonwealth Games in Kuala Lumpur. Since 1998 she has represented Samoa in netball.
