= Elaine Davis (netball) =

Jamaican international netball player

Personal information
- Full name: Elaine Lamour Davis
- Born: September 21, 1976 (age 49)
- School: Glenmuir High School
- University: UTech

Netball career
- Playing position: Goal Shooter
Years	Club team	Apps
- Jamalco
- Kingston Hummingbirds
Years	National team	Caps
1995–2007	Jamaica	
Medal record
Representing Jamaica
Netball World Championships
Bronze medal – third place	2003 Kingston	Netball
Bronze medal – third place	2007 Auckland	Netball
Commonwealth Games
Bronze medal – third place	2002 Manchester	Netball
- Updated on October 3, 2010

Elaine Lamour Davis (born 21 September 1976) is a Jamaican international netball player. Fresh out of high school, she got her baptism in international sports when she was selected as a member of the national senior team, the Sunshine Girls, for the ninth World Netball Championships held in Birmingham, England in 1995. Davis officially debuted for the Jamaica national team during the 1995 Netball World Championships against Barbados, and has played goal shooter for most of her career.

Playing for Jamaica at the Birmingham Tournament marked the beginning of an unbroken 12-year run of local, regional and international representation of her country on the netball court. In 1998, she played at the Commonwealth Games held in Malaysia; and friendlies against New Zealand and South Africa in 1999 were followed by a tri-test series against England. She was selected as a member of the team for the World Netball Championships in Christchurch, New Zealand, in 1999. Here, she emerged as the third highest goal scorer of the entire tournament. At the World Netball Championships held at the National Indoor Sports Centre in 2003, Elaine helped position Jamaica at third place behind the formidable Australia and New Zealand teams. She subsequently led the national team to the 2006 Commonwealth Games in Melbourne, Australia; and guided the Sunshine Girls to success over Caribbean neighbor, Trinidad and Tobago in a test series that same year. Not even the pain of five knee surgeries between 1996 and December 2006 deterred her from becoming one of Jamaica's best netball players and arguably their best Goal Shooter of all-time.

Throughout her career she competed in four Netball World Championships and three Commonwealth Games. Davis also played for the Auckland Diamonds in New Zealand's National Bank Cup in 2000. After the 2007 Netball World Championships, Davis announced that she will be taking a break from all forms of netball. In 2014, she was the starting Goal Shooter of the Kingston Hummingbirds, and led them to the national title, becoming the first winners of the inaugural Elite Netball League.

== Awards ==
The 2001 recipient of the Carreras Sports Foundation Special Award, she was also named Jamaica's Sportswoman of the Year for 2002–2003. In October 2007, she received the Courtney Walsh award for Excellence from Prime Minister Bruce Golding.
