= Althea Byfield =

Jamaican international basketball and netball player

Althea Lee formerly Althea Byfield
Personal information
- Full name: Althea Latoya Lee
- Born: 28 November 1982 (age 43) Kingston, Jamaica
- Height: 1.83 m (6 ft 0 in)

Sport
- Country: Jamaica
- Sport: Basketball, Netball
- Club: Basketball: Metrobelles; East Texas A&M Lions (2003–06); Netball: Jamaica
- Team: Basketball: Jamaica; Netball: Jamaica
Medal record
Netball
Representing Jamaica
Netball Youth Championships
Silver medal – second place	2000 Cardiff Wales	Netball
Netball World Championships
Bronze medal – third place	2007 Auckland	Netball
Bronze medal – third place	2003 Kingston	Netball
World Netball Series
Bronze medal – third place	2010 Liverpool	Fastnet

Althea Latoya Lee (born 28 November 1982 in Kingston, Jamaica) is a Jamaican international basketball and netball player. Lee is currently retired in both sports internationally and now resides in the United States.

== Early life ==
Althea Byfield was born in Kingston on 28 November 1984, the daughter of Tony Byfield and Jean Rumble. She also has a twin brother, Ian. Byfield attended high school at The Queen's School in Jamaica, and subsequently traveled to the United States to attend Midland Junior College in Texas.

== Basketball career ==
Byfield played basketball at Midland in the 2001–02 Western Junior College Athletic Conference season. In 2002, she transferred to Texas A&M University–Commerce, majoring in kinesiology, but did not play basketball until the 2003–04 season. In that season, Byfield started in 16 of 19 games played, averaging 7.1 points and 6.3 rebounds per match; she was also named Lions Newcomer of the year. In the following season, Byfield was the only player in the Lone Star Conference to be ranked in the top ten players for rebounds (3rd), assists (10th) and steals (3rd); she also had the seventh-highest minutes played throughout the LSC season, averaging over 33 minutes per game. The 2005–06 season saw her playing time reduced, somewhat due to a larger playing bench.

Byfield was also part of the Jamaican national women's basketball team selected to compete in the Caribbean Basketball Championships in 2006, and subsequently at the 2007 FIBA Americas Championship for Women. As of October 2008, she was playing for the Metrobelles in the Jamaican National Basketball League.

== Netball career ==
As a member of the Jamaican U21 squad, Byfield won a silver medal at the 2000 Netball World Youth Championships in Cardiff. Later, she was a member of the national squads that participated in the 2003 and 2007 Netball World Championships, with Jamaica winning bronze medals in both tournaments. In 2010, she featured in Jamaica's Commonwealth Games campaign in India and won bronze at the 2010 World Netball Series in England.

In domestic netball, Byfield plays for Jamalco in the Jamaican Netball Association Open League competition, having previously played for Waulgrovians and Blades United. In 2008, Byfield was signed with the Central Pulse in New Zealand for the 2009 ANZ Championship season. She became one of the team's standout players, although the Pulse finished their season in 10th place. Byfield transferred to the Northern Mystics in 2010 as their starting goalkeeper. She was not signed for the 2011 season.
