= Kadie-Ann Dehaney =

Jamaican netball player

Personal information
- Born: 4 September 1996 (age 30) Kingston, Jamaica
- Height: 1.92 m (6 ft 4 in)
- School: Melrose Junior High School; St Hugh's High School
- University: Mico University College

Netball career
- Playing positions: GK, GD
| Years | Club team | Apps |
| 2017-2021 | Melbourne Vixens | |
| 2022-2023 | Sunshine Coast Lightning | |
| 2024-Present | West Coast Fever | |
| Years | National team | Caps |
| 2015–present | Jamaica | 4 |
Medal record
Netball
Representing Jamaica
Commonwealth Games
| Silver medal – second place | 2022 Birmingham | Netball |
| Silver medal – second place | 2026 Glasgow | Netball |

Kadie-Ann Dehaney (born 4 September 1996 in Kingston, Jamaica) is a Jamaican netball player who plays for the West Coast Fever in the Suncorp Super Netball league. She has also represented the Jamaica national netball team.

== Early life ==
Dehaney was born in Kingston, Jamaica. She started her netball career at Melrose Junior High School and St Hughes High School before attending Mico University College.

== Career ==
Dehaney made her international netball debut in the 2015 Netball World Cup against Samoa. She participated at the 2013 Netball World Youth Cup in Glasgow, Scotland where the Jamaicans finished in third place. She also captained the under-21 Sunshine Girls at the 2017 Netball World Youth Cup in Gaborone, Botswana whereby the team finished in fifth place. In 2015, she earned the MVP award in the Berger Elite League final whereby her team, the Clarendon Gators defeated the St James Sharpes. That following year, she earned a spot in the Sunshine Girls squad to the 2015 Netball World Cup. In 2017, she was signed by the Australian-based team the Melbourne Vixens in the Suncorp Super Netball.
