= Jodi-Ann Ward =

Jamaican netball player (born 1994)

Personal information
- Born: 1 September 1994 (age 31)
- Height: 1.78 m (5 ft 10 in)

Netball career
- Playing positions: GD, WD, GK
Years	Club team	Apps
2019	Severn Stars	
2020-2023	Collingwood Magpies	
2024-present	Giants Netball	
Years	National team	Caps
2017-present	Jamaica	
Medal record
Women's Netball
Representing Jamaica
Commonwealth Games
Bronze medal – third place	2018 Gold Coast	Netball
Silver medal – second place	2022 Birmingham	Netball
Silver medal – second place	2026 Glasgow	Netball

Jodi-Ann Ward (born 1 September 1994) is a Jamaican netball player who plays for Giants Netball in the Suncorp Super Netball league and the Jamaica national team since 2017.

== Club career ==
Ward has played domestic netball in several countries. Her career began in the Jamaican elite league for St. Catherine Racers in 2017, before she was signed by UK Netball Superleague club the Severn Stars ahead of the 2019 season. Ward played in England for one year before being signed by the Collingwood Magpies for the 2020 Australian season. In 2024 she signed for Giants netball.

== International career ==
Ward made her international debut in late 2017 against Barbados at the age of 22. She was also selected for the Jamaican netball team to take part at the 2018 Commonwealth Games. She was a key member of the Jamaican squad which stunned New Zealand in the bronze medal match as a part of the 2018 Commonwealth Games. Ward was also part of the squad that won their first ever silver medal at the Commonwealth Games in Birmingham 2022, losing to Australia in the final, after defeating New Zealand in the semis and beating Australia for the first time in a Commonwealth Games during the group stage.
