= Paula Thompson =

Jamaican netball player (born 1984)

Personal information
- Born: 17 November 1984 (age 41) Clarendon, Jamaica
- Occupation: netball player
- Height: 1.78 m (5 ft 10 in)

Netball career
- Playing position: C
Medal record
Women's Netball
Representing Jamaica
Commonwealth Games
Bronze medal – third place	2014 Glasgow	team
Bronze medal – third place	2018 Gold Coast	team
World Netball Series
Silver medal – second place	2009 Manchester	Fast5
Bronze medal – third place	2010 Liverpool	Fast5
Bronze medal – third place	2013 Auckland	Fast5

Paula Thompson (17 November 1984) is a Jamaican netball player who currently plays for Jamaica internationally. She was one of the members of the Jamaican netball team which secured bronze medals at the 2010 World Netball Series, 2013 Fast5 Netball World Series, 2014 Commonwealth Games, and in the 2018 Commonwealth Games.

Thompson was one of the key members who were part of the Jamaican squad which stunned defending Commonwealth Games champion and world champion, New Zealand in the bronze medal match as a part of the 2018 Commonwealth Games.
