= Stacian Facey =

Jamaican netball player (born 1993)

Personal information
- Nationality: Jamaican
- Born: 9 August 1993 (age 32)

Sport
- Sport: Netball
Medal record
Representing Jamaica
World University Netball Championship
Silver medal – second place	2016 Miami	Team
Commonwealth Games
Bronze medal – third place	2014 Glasgow	Team
Bronze medal – third place	2018 Gold Coast	Team

Stacian Facey (born 9 August 1993) is a Jamaican netball player. She was part of the teams that won bronze at the 2014 and 2018 Commonwealth Games, and that placed fourth at the 2015 Netball World Cup.
