= Jhaniele Fowler-Nembhard =

Jamaican netball player

Personal information
- Born: 21 July 1989 (age 37) Jamaica
- Occupation: Professional Netballer
- Height: 1.98 m (6 ft 6 in)

Netball career
- Playing position: GS
Years	Club team	Apps
2009–2013	Waulgrovians	
2013–2017	Southern Steel	71
2018–present	West Coast Fever	150
- (Correct as of 29 June 2023)
Years	National team	Caps
2010–present	Jamaica	101
- (Correct as of 19 July 2024)
Medal record
Representing Jamaica
Commonwealth Games
Bronze medal – third place	2014 Glasgow	Netball
Bronze medal – third place	2018 Gold Coast	Netball
Silver medal – second place	2022 Birmingham	Netball
Fast5 Netball World Series
Bronze medal – third place	2010 Liverpool	Fast5
Netball World Cup
Bronze medal – third place	2023 Cape Town	Netball

Jhaniele Fowler-Nembhard (née Fowler; born 21 July 1989) is a professional Jamaican netball player who plays for the West Coast Fever in Super Netball. Fowler-Nembhard is a 5-time Super Netball Player of the Year Award winner and was named Netball Scoop World's Best Netballer in 2021.

== Domestic career ==
Fowler-Nembhard played domestic netball in Jamaica for the Waulgrovians club.

In 2011, Fowler-Nembhard was signed to play in the Australasian ANZ Championship with Australian team, the Adelaide Thunderbirds, on a two-year contract. Her contract was contingent on the Thunderbirds' current import, fellow Jamaican shooter Carla Borrego, on gaining Australian citizenship, and allowing the team's import spot for Fowler. However, Borrego was unable to gain citizenship in time for the 2012 season, and Fowler-Nembhard did not play with the Thunderbirds. She was later approached by New Zealand–based team, the Southern Steel, who signed her on a one-year contract for the 2013 season. At a height of 1.98 m (6 ft 6 in), Fowler-Nembhard was the second-tallest player in the Australasian league, after 2.03 m (6 ft 8 in) Megan Craig (who debuted for the Mystics in 2016).

Fowler-Nembhard returned to the Australian domestic scene in 2018, where she plays for West Coast Fever. She has been the leading goalscorer in the Suncorp Super Netball League every year since 2018 and holds the record for the most goals scored in a season. She was also named Super Netball Player of the Year for 5 consecutive years between 2018 and 2022. In 2023, Fowler-Nembhard claimed her fifth consecutive Stacey Marinkovich Medal for Best and Fairest after another stellar campaign in which she scored her 5000th Suncorp Super Netball goal of her career.

== International career ==
Fowler-Nembhard has been a member of the Jamaica national netball team (the Sunshine Girls) since 2010.

Fowler-Nembhard has competed at three Fast5 Netball World Series tournaments with the Jamaica national team, winning a bronze medal in 2010.

She has competed at the Commonwealth Games in 2010 in Delhi, 2014 in Glasgow, and captained the team in 2018 in Australia and 2022 in Birmingham. In 2022 Fowler-Nembhard was Captain of the Jamaican team that achieved a historic, first time for the country, silver medal at the Commonwealth Games in Birmingham, in the UK. Losing to Australia in the final, after defeating New Zealand in the semis and beating Australia for the first time in a Commonwealth Games during the group stage. There also was a match with Barbados that saw over 100 goals recorded by Jhaniele's team.

Fowler-Nembhard competed in the Netball World Cup in 2011 in Singapore and 2015 in Australia. She captained the Sunshine Girls at the Netball World Cups in 2019 in England and 2023 in South Africa. In 2023 Fowler-Nembhard captained Jamaica to win Bronze at the World Cup in South Africa. She scored 302/310 (97.4%) goals during the tournament and was the only Jamaican named in the World Cup team of the Tournament.

== Personal life ==
Fowler-Nembhard grew up in Montego Bay, moving to St Thomas at 19 years of age. She married Andre Reid in December 2013 and was known as Jhaniele Fowler-Reid until approximately 2021. The couple have a daughter together. On 20 December 2023, Fowler married Ashani Nembhard in a private ceremony in Kingston.

In December 2025, she announced her pregnancy, which will sideline her from the 2026 Suncorp Super Netball season.
