= Vangelee Williams =

Jamaican international netball player (born 1992)

Personal information
- Born: 26 May 1992 (age 34)
- Height: 1.75 m (5 ft 9 in)

Netball career
- Playing positions: WD, GD, GK
Years	National team	Caps
2012–present	Jamaica	
Medal record
Representing Jamaica
Commonwealth Games
Bronze medal – third place	2014 Glasgow	Netball
Bronze medal – third place	2018 Gold Coast	Netball
Fast5 World Series
Silver medal – second place	2017 Melbourne	Fast5
Bronze medal – third place	2013 Auckland	Fast5
- Updated on 19 May 2018

Vangelee Williams (born 26 May 1992) is a Jamaican international netball player. Williams is a member of the Jamaica national netball team and primarily plays WD, GD, and GK. She debuted for the Sunshine Girls in 2012 against the South Africa, and was part of the teams that won bronze at the 2014 and 2018 Commonwealth Games, and that placed fourth at the 2015 Netball World Cup. In 2016, she signed to play in the English Superleague for Team Bath.
