= Nicole Dixon =

Jamaican netball player (born 1995)

Personal information
- Nationality: Jamaican
- Born: 3 February 1995 (age 31)

Sport
- Sport: Netball
Medal record
Representing Jamaica
World University Netball Championship
Silver medal – second place	2016 Miami	Team
Commonwealth Games
Silver medal – second place	2022 Birmingham	Team
Silver medal – second place	2026 Glasgow	Netball
Bronze medal – third place	2018 Gold Coast	Team

Nicole Dixon (born 3 February 1995) is a Jamaican netball player. She was part of the Jamaican squad that won bronze at the 2018 Commonwealth Games and was an unused reserve member (not a part of the official squad) of the 2014 team.

In 2017, Dixon was temporarily suspended from the national team, along with fellow players Shanice Beckford and Khadijah Williams, due to a team training incident.
