= Khadijah Williams =

Jamaican international netball player (born 1994)

Personal information
- Born: 29 December 1994 (age 31)
- Height: 1.68 m (5 ft 6 in)

Netball career
- Playing positions: C, WA, GA
Years	National team	Caps
2013–present	Jamaica	
Medal record
Representing Jamaica
World University Netball Championship
Silver medal – second place	2016 Miami	Team
Commonwealth Games
Bronze medal – third place	2014 Glasgow	Netball
Bronze medal – third place	2018 Gold Coast	Netball
Silver medal – second place	2022 Birmingham	Netball
Fast5 World Series
Silver medal – second place	2017 Melbourne	Fast5
Bronze medal – third place	2013 Auckland	Fast5
- Updated on 19 May 2018

Khadijah Williams (born 29 December 1994) is a Jamaican international netball player. Primarily a midcourter, Williams debuted for the Jamaica national netball team, the Sunshine Girls, in 2013 against England. She was a member of the team that won bronze at the 2014 and 2018 Commonwealth Games, and that finished fourth at the 2015 Netball World Cup.

In 2017 Williams was temporarily suspended from the national team, along with fellow players Shanice Beckford and Nicole Dixon, during a team training incident, but was later cleared of all charges.
