= Rebekah Robinson =

Jamaican netball player (born 1995)

Personal information
- Nationality: Jamaican
- Born: 23 January 1995 (age 31)

Sport
- Sport: Netball
Medal record
Netball
Representing Jamaica
Commonwealth Games
Bronze medal – third place	2018 Gold Coast	Netball
Silver medal – second place	2022 Birmingham	Netball
Central American and Caribbean Games
Gold medal – first place	2023 San Salvador	Netball

Rebekah Robinson (born 23 January 1995) is a Jamaican netball player. She was part of the Jamaican squad that won bronze at the 2018 Commonwealth Games.
