= Adean Thomas =

Jamaican netball player (born 1994)

Personal information
- Nationality: Jamaican
- Born: 31 July 1994 (age 32)

Sport
- Sport: Netball
Medal record
Representing Jamaica
World University Netball Championship
| Silver medal – second place | 2016 Miami | Team |
Commonwealth Games
| Bronze medal – third place | 2018 Gold Coast | Netball |
| Silver medal – second place | 2022 Birmingham | Netball |
Central American and Caribbean Games
| Gold medal – first place | 2023 San Salvador | Netball |

Adean Thomas (born 31 July 1994) is a Jamaican netball player. She was part of the Jamaican squad that won bronze at the 2018 Commonwealth Games.
