= Shanice Beckford =

Jamaican netball player (born 1995)

Personal information
- Born: 16 April 1995 (age 31)
- Height: 175 cm (5 ft 9 in)

Netball career
| Years | Club team | Apps |
| 2024–2025 2027–present | West Coast Fever | |
Medal record
Representing Jamaica
World University Netball Championship
| Silver medal – second place | 2016 Miami | Team |
Commonwealth Games
| Silver medal – second place | 2022 Birmingham | Netball |
| Silver medal – second place | 2026 Glasgow | Netball |
| Bronze medal – third place | 2014 Glasgow | Netball |
| Bronze medal – third place | 2018 Gold Coast | Netball |

Shanice Beckford (born 16 April 1995) is a Jamaican netball player. She was part of the teams that won bronze at the 2014 and 2018 Commonwealth Games, and that placed fourth at the 2015 Netball World Cup.

In 2017, Beckford was temporarily suspended from the national team, along with fellow players Khadijah Williams and Nicole Dixon, during a team training incident, but was later cleared of all charges.
