= Jamaica at the 2002 Commonwealth Games =

- CG code: JAM
- CGA: Jamaica Olympic Association
- Website: www.joa.org.jm

in Manchester, England
- Flag bearers: Opening: Closing:
- Medals Ranked 13th: Gold 4 Silver 6 Bronze 7 Total 17

Commonwealth Games appearances (overview)
- 1934; 1938–1950; 1954; 1958; 1962; 1966; 1970; 1974; 1978; 1982; 1986; 1990; 1994; 1998; 2002; 2006; 2010; 2014; 2018; 2022; 2026; 2030

Jamaica CGA Logo

Jamaica competed at the Commonwealth Games in Manchester. It was the 13th time that the nation has competed at the Games. Jamaica sent 44 men and 44 women and came 13th in the medals table, a drop in placing from 9th in Kuala Kumpur in 1998 but showing a significant increase in the number of medals won.

== Medals ==
	Gold	Silver	Bronze	Total
Jamaica	4	6	7	17

== Gold ==
Athletics:

(gold) Lacena Golding-Clarke, Women's 100 Meters Hurdles
(gold) Michael Blackwood, Men's 400 Meters
(gold) Claston Bernard, Men's Decathlon
(gold) Elva Goulbourne, Women's Long Jump

== Silver ==
Athletics:

(silver) Veronica Campbell, Women's 100 Meters
(silver) Vonette Dixon, Women's 100 Meters Hurdles
(silver) Juliet Campbell, Women's 200 Meters
(silver) Debbie-Ann Parris, Women's 400 Meters Hurdles
(silver) Asafa Powell, Chris Williams, Dwight Thomas, Michael Frater, Men's 4×100 Meters Relay
(silver) Astia Walker, Elva Goulbourne, Juliet Campbell, Veronica Campbell, Women's 4×100 Meters Relay

== Bronze ==
Athletics:

(bronze) Maurice Wignall, Men's 110 Meters Hurdles
(bronze) Alexandra "Sandie" Angela Richards, Women's 400 Meters
(bronze) Ian Weakley, Men's 400 Meters Hurdles
(bronze) Trecia Smith, Women's Triple Jump

Netball:

(bronze) Jamaica national netball team

Swimming:

(bronze) Janelle Atkinson, Women's 400 Meters Freestyle
(bronze) Janelle Atkinson, Women's 800 Meters Freestyle

== Netball ==
With a team captained by Oberon Pitterson, featuring Nadine Bryan, Elaine Davis and Simone Forbes and coached by Maureen Hall, Jamaica finished third at the netball at the 2002 Commonwealth Games after defeating England 55–53 in the bronze medal match.

Pool B

26 July 2002	Jamaica	65–20	Barbados
20:30	Simone Forbes 37; Elaine Davis 28	Report	Cheryl Squires 37; Olivia Walcott 28

27 July 2002	Jamaica	66–55	South Africa
15:00	Elaine Davis 46/54 (85%); Simone Forbes 20/21 (95%)	Report	Sindiswe Gumede 49/58 (84%); Adele Jonker 3 Shani Welthagen 2 Martha Machoga 1

29 July 2002	Jamaica	84–33	Fiji
18:30	Elaine Davis 58/64 (91%); Simone Forbes 18/20 (90%); Tiffannie Wolfe 8	Report	Matelita Shaw 14/23 (61%); Paulini Tora 12; Taraima Rara 7

30 July 2002	Australia	60–33	Jamaica
20:30	Sharelle McMahon 23; Eloise Southby 20; Catherine Cox 17	Report	Elaine Davis 22; Simone Forbes 11

Table

Pos	Team	P	W	D	L	GF	GA	GD	Pts
1	Australia	4	4	0	0	292	131	+161	8
2	Jamaica	4	3	0	1	248	168	+80	6
3	South Africa	4	2	0	2	201	219	-18	4
4	Barbados	4	1	0	3	131	240	-109	2
5	Fiji	4	0	0	4	151	265	-114	0

Qualified for Major semi-finals
Qualified for Minor Semi-finals
Qualified for 7th/10th classification

Minor semi-finals

31 July 2002	Jamaica	72–32	Wales
	Elaine Davis 42; Simone Forbes 19	Report	Mair Jones 24; Sian Edwards 5 Jamilla Harris 3

Major semi-finals

2 August 2002	New Zealand	69–51	Jamaica
18:30	Irene van Dyk 41/48 (85%); Donna Loffhagen 28		Elaine Davis 28; Simone Forbes 23

Bronze medal match

4 August 2002	Jamaica	55–53	England
11:00	Elaine Davis 42; Simone Forbes 13		Alex Astle 32/38 (84%); Abby Teare 21	Attendance: 10,000

Squad

Jamaica roster
Players
Coaches

Name	Pos	DOB	Height	Club	Nat	Caps
Nadine Bryan	C, WA	18 December 1976 (aged 25)	1.65 m (5 ft 5 in)
Elaine Davis	GS, GK	21 September 1976 (aged 25)	1.90 m (6 ft 3 in)
Nadine Ffrench			–
Simone Forbes	GS, GA	20 June 1981 (aged 21)	1.73 m (5 ft 8 in)
Nichala Gibson	WD, GD	20 October 1982 (aged 19)	1.72 m (5 ft 8 in)
Georgia Gordon			–
Kaydia Kentish			–
Tasha Morgan			–
Oberon Pitterson (c)	GK, GD, WD	8 February 1971 (aged 31)	1.80 m (5 ft 11 in)
Sharmalee Watkins			–
Sharon Wiles			–
Tiffannie Wolfe			–

Head coach

- Maureen Hall

Notes

- (c) – Captain
- (cc) – Co-captain
- (vc) – Vice-captain
- – Injury / maternity leave
- (TRP) – Temporary Replacement Player
