= 2010 Taini Jamison Trophy Series =

International netball series

Tournament details
- Host country: New Zealand
- Dates: 7–21 August 2010
- Teams: 3

Final positions
- Champions: New Zealand (2nd title)
- Runners-up: Jamaica

Tournament statistics
- Matches played: 3

The 2010 Taini Jamison Trophy Series was the third Taini Jamison Trophy series. It featured New Zealand playing Samoa and Jamaica in a series of three netball test matches, played in August 2010. New Zealand won all three tests. The New Zealand team were coached by Ruth Aitken and captained by Casey Williams. All the teams used the series to prepare for the 2010 Commonwealth Games.

== Squads ==
=== New Zealand ===
New Zealand roster
Players
Coaches

Name	Pos	DOB	Height	Club	Nat	Caps
Liana Barrett-Chase	C, WA	31 October 1984 (aged 25)	1.68 m (5 ft 6 in)	Southern Steel
Leana de Bruin	GD, GK	9 July 1977 (aged 33)	1.90 m (6 ft 3 in)	Southern Steel
Irene van Dyk	GS, GA	21 June 1972 (aged 38)	1.90 m (6 ft 3 in)	Waikato Bay of Plenty Magic
Temepara George	C, WA	23 October 1975 (aged 34)	1.70 m (5 ft 7 in)	Northern Mystics
Katrina Grant	GK, GD, WD	6 May 1987 (aged 23)	1.87 m (6 ft 2 in)	Central Pulse
Joline Henry	GD, WD	29 September 1982 (aged 27)	1.83 m (6 ft 0 in)	Northern Mystics
Laura Langman	C, WD	16 April 1986 (aged 24)	1.73 m (5 ft 8 in)	Waikato Bay of Plenty Magic
Grace Rasmussen	WA, C, GA	18 March 1988 (aged 22)	1.77 m (5 ft 10 in)	Northern Mystics
Anna Scarlett	GK, GD, WD	15 April 1983 (aged 27)	1.87 m (6 ft 2 in)	Northern Mystics
Maria Tutaia	GA, GS	18 February 1987 (aged 23)	1.88 m (6 ft 2 in)	Northern Mystics
Casey Williams (c)	GD, GK	19 June 1985 (aged 25)	1.88 m (6 ft 2 in)	Waikato Bay of Plenty Magic
Daneka Wipiiti	GS	8 December 1982 (aged 27)	1.94 m (6 ft 4 in)	Southern Steel

Head coach

- Ruth Aitken

Assistant coach

- Waimarama Taumaunu

Notes

- (c) – Captain
- (cc) – Co-captain
- (vc) – Vice-captain
- – Injury / maternity leave
- (TRP) – Temporary Replacement Player

Debuts

- Grace Rasmussen made her senior debut for New Zealand against Samoa.

=== Jamaica ===
Jamaica roster
Players
Coaches

Name	Pos	DOB	Height	Club	Nat	Caps
Nicole Aiken	GA, GD	11 December 1985 (aged 24)	1.87 m (6 ft 2 in)
Romelda Aiken	GS, GA	19 November 1988 (aged 21)	1.96 m (6 ft 5 in)	Queensland Firebirds
Nadine Bryan (c)	C, WA	18 December 1976 (aged 33)	1.65 m (5 ft 5 in)
Sasha-Gay Lynch	GD, GK, WD		1.55 m (5 ft 1 in)
Sasher-Gaye Henry		9 November 1979 (aged 30)	–
Georgia Gordon			–
Anna Kaye Griffith	GS, GA		–
Malysha Kelly	GD, GK	14 January 1990 (aged 20)	1.85 m (6 ft 1 in)
Paula Thompson	C	17 November 1984 (aged 25)	1.78 m (5 ft 10 in)
Sateva Taylor	GD, GK		–
Vanessa Walker			–

Head coach

- Connie Francis

Notes

- (c) – Captain
- (cc) – Co-captain
- (vc) – Vice-captain
- – Injury / maternity leave
- (TRP) – Temporary Replacement Player

== Matches ==
=== New World International Test ===
==== First test ====
7 August 2010	New Zealand	92–28	Samoa	Te Rauparaha Arena
7 August 2010	Irene van Dyk 48/50 (96%); Maria Tutaia 16/17 (94%); Grace Rasmussen 16/17 (94%); Daneka Wipiiti 14/18 (78%)			Te Rauparaha Arena

=== New World International Series ===
==== Second test ====
18 August 2010	New Zealand	58–35	Jamaica	CBS Canterbury Arena
18 August 2010	Scoring by quarter: 11–10, 29–21, 41–28, 58–35			CBS Canterbury Arena
18 August 2010	Irene van Dyk 45/48 (94%); Maria Tutaia; Grace Rasmussen		Romelda Aiken; Anna Kaye Griffith	CBS Canterbury Arena

==== Third test ====
21 August 2010	New Zealand	62–40	Jamaica	Pettigrew Green Arena
21 August 2010	Scoring by quarter: 19–12, 35–21, 48–33, 62–40			Pettigrew Green Arena
21 August 2010	Irene van Dyk 30/35 (86%); Maria Tutaia 24/31 (77%); Daneka Wipiiti 8/16 (50%)		Romelda Aiken 33/38 (87%); Anna Kaye Griffith 7/13 (54%)	Pettigrew Green Arena
