= Nadine Bryan =

Jamaica netball international

Personal information
- Full name: Nadine Tamara Bryan
- Born: 18 December 1976 (age 49)
- Occupation: Accountant
- Height: 1.65 m (5 ft 5 in)
- University: University of the West Indies

Netball career
- Playing positions: C, WA
Years	Club team	Apps
2003–2011	Jamalco	
2004–2014	General Accident	
2011–2014	UWI Pelicans	
2014	Clarendon Gators	
Years	National team	Caps
1996–2014	Jamaica	159
Medal record
Representing Jamaica
World Netball Championships
Bronze medal – third place	2003 Kingston	Team
Bronze medal – third place	2007 Auckland	Team
Commonwealth Games
Bronze medal – third place	2002 Manchester	Team
World Netball Series
Silver medal – second place	2009 Manchester	Team
Bronze medal – third place	2010 Liverpool	Team

Nadine Bryan (born 18 December 1976) is a former Jamaica netball international. She was a member of the Jamaica teams that were bronze medallists at the 2002 Commonwealth Games and at the 2003 and 2007 World Netball Championships and silver medallists at the 2009 World Netball Series. Between 2009 and 2013, she captained Jamaica, including at the 2010 Taini Jamison Trophy Series and 2011 World Netball Championships.

== Playing career ==
=== Jamalco ===
Bryan played for Jamalco in the Jamaica Netball Association's Super League. Between 2003 and 2009, she was a prominent member the Jamalco team that won seven consecutive league titles. By 2009, she had been named the league's Most Valuable Player on four occasions. In 2008 and 2009, she won consecutive MVP awards. She also played for Jamalco in the JNA's Open League. Her teammates at Jamalco included fellow Jamaica netball internationals, Romelda Aiken, Nicole Aiken and Elaine Davis.

=== General Accident ===
Between 2004 and 2014, Bryan played for General Accident in the Business House Senior League. Bryan was a long time employee at General Accident, serving as an accountant at the insurance company. Oberon Pitterson was her teammate, colleague and coach at General Accident. Bryan helped General Accident win several league titles, including in 2007, 2008, 2012 and 2013. In the 2012 final, Bryan was named Most Valuable Player after leading General Accident to a 47–41 victory over Scotiabank. While she typically played as a midcourt player for Jamaica, she frequently played as Goal Attack or Goal Shooter for General Accident. General Accident sponsored Bryan and covered her expenses for her to attend the 2011 World Netball Championships.

=== UWI Pelicans ===
Between 2011 and 2014, while attending the University of the West Indies, Bryan played for UWI Pelicans. In November 2011, Bryan was a Pelicans player when she captained Jamaica at the 2011 World Netball Series. She was a student-athlete at UWI when, in June 2012, she made her 100th senior appearance for Jamaica. She represented UWI Pelicans in the Jamaica Netball Association's Open League and in Intercollegiate competitions. In September 2014, she helped Pelicans reclaim the UWI/UTech Games title with a win over UTech. Her teammates at UWI Pelicans included Malysha Kelly.

=== Berger Elite League ===
For the inaugural 2014 Berger Elite League season, Bryan alongside Nicole Aiken-Pinnock and Kasey Evering, was drafted by Clarendon Gators.

=== Jamaica ===
In 1996, Bryan made her senior debut for Jamaica. After returning from the 1996 World Youth Netball Championships, she was called up to the senior squad just one day later by head coach Maureen Hall. Between 1999 and 2011, Bryan played for Jamaica at four World Netball Championships. She was a member of the Jamaica teams that were bronze medallists at the 2002 Commonwealth Games and at the 2003 and 2007 World Netball Championships and silver medallists at the 2009 World Netball Series. Between 2009 and 2013, she captained Jamaica. In December 2009, after several years as vice-captain, Bryan was temporarily promoted to captain, after Simone Forbes opted to take a break from international netball. Bryan subsequently captained Jamaica during the 2010 Taini Jamison Trophy Series. Ahead of the 2011 World Netball Championships, she was named captain on a more permanent basis. Bryan also captained Jamaica and was named player of the series at the 2011 World Netball Series. On 15 June 2012, Bryan made her 100th senior appearance for Jamaica during a home series against South Africa. She again captained Jamaica at the 2012 Fast5 Netball World Series. Ahead of an April 2013 series against England, it was reported that Bryan had made 154 senior appearances for Jamaica.

Tournaments	Place
1996 World Youth Netball Championships	5th
1998 Commonwealth Games	5th
1999 World Netball Championships	4th
2002 Commonwealth Games	3rd place, bronze medalist(s)
2003 World Netball Championships	3rd place, bronze medalist(s)
2006 Commonwealth Games	4th
2007 World Netball Championships	3rd place, bronze medalist(s)
2008 AFNA Championships	1st
2009 World Netball Series	2nd place, silver medalist(s)
2010 Taini Jamison Trophy Series	2nd
2010 Commonwealth Games	4th
2010 World Netball Series	3rd
2011 World Netball Championships	4th
2011 World Netball Series	4th
2012 AFNA Championships	1st
2012 Fast5 Netball World Series	4th
