= Netball at the 2006 Commonwealth Games =

Commonwealth Games netball tournament hosted by Australia

Tournament details
- Host country: Australia
- City: Melbourne
- Venue(s): State Netball Hockey Centre; Melbourne Multi Purpose Venue
- Dates: 17–26 March 2006
- Teams: 12

Final positions
- Champions: New Zealand (1st title)
- Runners-up: Australia
- Third place: England

Tournament statistics
- Matches played: 38
- Top scorer(s): Irene van Dyk (New Zealand); 300/324 (93%)

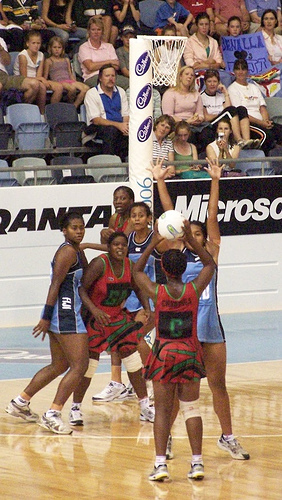
Malawi playing Fiji in pool 1

Netball at the 2006 Commonwealth Games was the third netball tournament at the Commonwealth Games. Twelve teams, including the hosts Australia, featured in a series of matches played in March 2006 in Melbourne. The pool stage and classification matches were hosted at the State Netball Hockey Centre while the semi-finals, bronze and gold medal matches were hosted at the Melbourne Multi Purpose Venue. With a team captained by Adine Wilson and coached by Ruth Aitken, New Zealand won the gold medal for the first time with a 60–55 win over Australia. England finished the tournament in third place after defeating Jamaica 53–52 in the bronze medal match.

== Qualification ==
Australia qualified automatically as the host nation. The others qualified via the 2003 World Netball Championships and a series of regional qualifying tournaments.

Tournament	Qualified
Host nation	Australia
2003 World Netball Championships	New Zealand; Jamaica; England; South Africa; Samoa; Barbados
2005 AFNA Championships	Saint Vincent and the Grenadines
2005 Asian Netball Championships	Singapore
2005 Oceania Netball Federation Qualifying Tournament	Fiji
2005 FENA Open	Wales
2005 Confederation of African Netball Associations Qualifying Tournament	Malawi

== Head coaches and captains ==
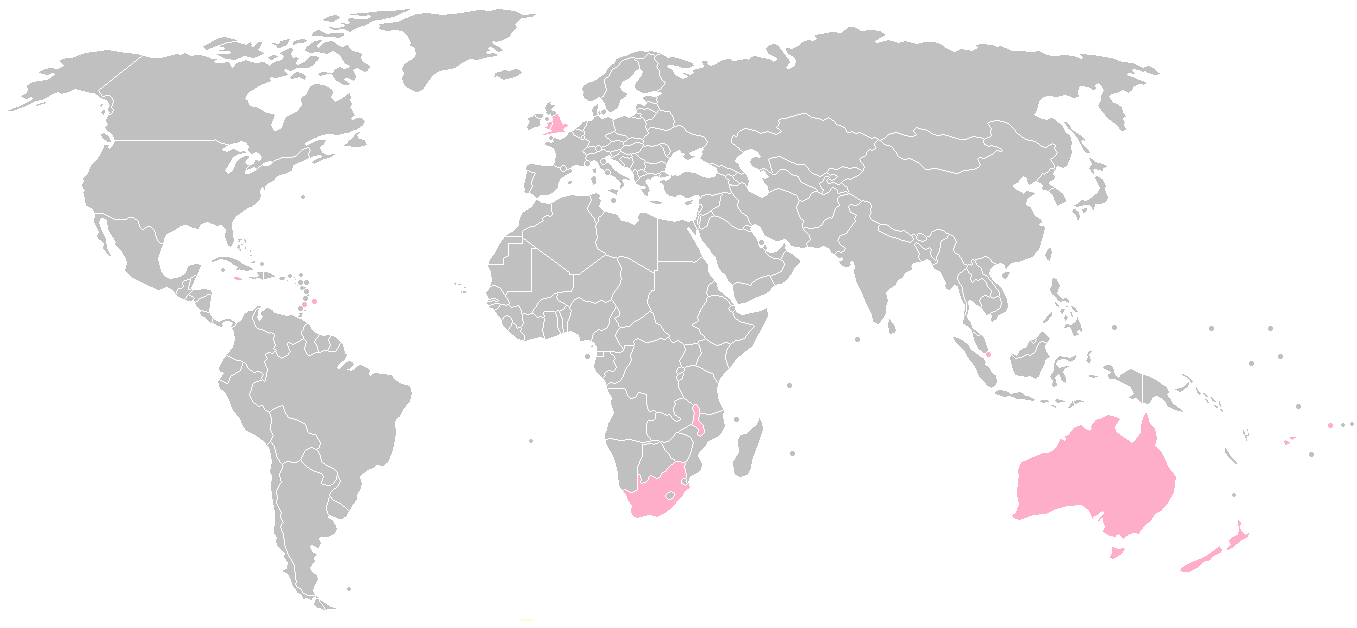
Countries that competed in the 2006 Commonwealth Games netball tournament.

Team	Head coach	Captain
Australia	Norma Plummer	Sharelle McMahon
Barbados	Anna Shepherd	Julie Phillips
England	Margaret Caldow	Olivia Murphy
Fiji	Megan Simpson	Matila Waqanidrola; Unaisi Rokoura
Jamaica	Maureen Hall	Elaine Davis
Malawi	Griffin Saenda	Mary Waya
New Zealand	Ruth Aitken	Adine Wilson
Saint Vincent and the Grenadines	Godfrey Harry	Dellerice Duncan
Samoa	Linda Vagana	Frances Solia
Singapore	Kate Carpenter	Pearline Chan
South Africa	Marlene Wagner	Charlene Hertzog
Wales	Julia Longville	Ursula Bowers

== Umpires ==
Umpire	Association
Anne Abraitis	Scotland
Bill Alexander	England
Bobbi Brown	New Zealand
Chris Campbell	Jamaica
Stacey Campton	Australia
Jacqui Jashari	Australia
Marion Johnson-Hurley	Barbados
Sharon Kelly	Australia
Carolene Logan	Scotland
Bronwyn Meek	New Zealand
Mandy Nottingham	New Zealand
Pauline Sciascia	New Zealand
Michelle Phippard	Australia

== Pool 1 ==
All Pool 1 matches were hosted at the State Netball Hockey Centre.

=== Day 1 ===
Friday 17 March; 15:00 (UTC+11)	Report; Stats	Saint Vincent and the Grenadines	31–98	New Zealand	Umpires: Bill Alexander; Jackie Jashari; Reserve umpire: Michelle Phippard
Friday 17 March; 15:00 (UTC+11)	Report; Stats	Scoring by quarter: 3-29, 12-22, 5-27, 11-20			Umpires: Bill Alexander; Jackie Jashari; Reserve umpire: Michelle Phippard
Friday 17 March; 15:00 (UTC+11)	Report; Stats	Galeine Gordon 27/34 (79%); Samathea Christopher 2/3 (67%); Nicole Sandy 2/4 (50%)		Irene van Dyk 48/49 (98%); Maria Tutaia 24/26 (92%); Belinda Colling 18/21 (86%); Jessica Tuki 8/16 (50%)	Umpires: Bill Alexander; Jackie Jashari; Reserve umpire: Michelle Phippard

Friday 17 March; 18:30 (UTC+11)	Report; Stats	England	63–47	Malawi	Umpires: Stacey Campton; Bronwyn Meek; Reserve umpire: Carolene Logan
Friday 17 March; 18:30 (UTC+11)	Report; Stats	Scoring by quarter: 20-11, 16-13, 14-12, 13-11			Umpires: Stacey Campton; Bronwyn Meek; Reserve umpire: Carolene Logan
Friday 17 March; 18:30 (UTC+11)	Report; Stats	Rachel Dunn 23/33 (70%); Louisa Brownfield 19/28 (68%); Pamela Cookey 13/14 (93%); Abby Teare 8/12 (67%)		Linda Magombo 34/41 (83%); Mary Waya 11/17 (65%); Annie Mopiha 1/1 (100%); Peace Chawinga 1/1 (100%)	Umpires: Stacey Campton; Bronwyn Meek; Reserve umpire: Carolene Logan

=== Day 2 ===
Saturday 18 March; 13:00 (UTC+11)	Report; Stats	England	60–41	Fiji	Umpires: Chris Campbell; Bronwyn Meek; Reserve umpire: Christine Robinson
Saturday 18 March; 13:00 (UTC+11)	Report; Stats	Scoring by quarter: 18-9, 15-9, 10-14, 17-9			Umpires: Chris Campbell; Bronwyn Meek; Reserve umpire: Christine Robinson
Saturday 18 March; 13:00 (UTC+11)	Report; Stats	Rachel Dunn 30/36 (83%); Pamela Cookey 24/35 (69%); Abby Teare 6/9 (67%)		Matelita Shaw 24/30 (80%); Taraima Rara 17/23 (74%)	Umpires: Chris Campbell; Bronwyn Meek; Reserve umpire: Christine Robinson

Saturday 18 March; 20:30 (UTC+11)	Report; Stats	Malawi	57–56	South Africa	Umpires: Anne Abraitis; Marion Johnson-Hurley; Reserve umpire: Bill Alexander
Saturday 18 March; 20:30 (UTC+11)	Report; Stats	Scoring by quarter: 15-19, 12-16, 14-9, 16-12			Umpires: Anne Abraitis; Marion Johnson-Hurley; Reserve umpire: Bill Alexander
Saturday 18 March; 20:30 (UTC+11)	Report; Stats	Linda Magombo 30/36 (83%); Mary Waya 27/31 (87%)		Sindisiwe Gumede 43/55 (78%); Lizanne Helmand 13/18 (72%)	Umpires: Anne Abraitis; Marion Johnson-Hurley; Reserve umpire: Bill Alexander

=== Day 3 ===
Sunday 19 March; 15:00 (UTC+11)	Stats	South Africa	80–34	Saint Vincent and the Grenadines	Umpires: Sharon Kelly; Chris Campbell; Reserve umpire: Pauline Sciascia
Sunday 19 March; 15:00 (UTC+11)	Stats	Scoring by quarter: 15-10, 23-8, 19-8, 23-8			Umpires: Sharon Kelly; Chris Campbell; Reserve umpire: Pauline Sciascia
Sunday 19 March; 15:00 (UTC+11)	Stats	Sindisiwe Gumede 41/49 (84%); Christine Markgraaff 31/41 (76%); Lizanne Helmand 6/8 (75%); Nthabiseng Moabi 2/2 (100%)		Galeine Gordon 18/20 (90%); Nicole Sandy 9/13 (69%); Samathea Christopher 7/10 (70%)	Umpires: Sharon Kelly; Chris Campbell; Reserve umpire: Pauline Sciascia

Sunday 19 March; 18:30 (UTC+11)	Report; Stats	New Zealand	80–26	Fiji	Umpires: Marion Johnson-Hurley; Michelle Phippard; Reserve umpire: Anne Abraitis
Sunday 19 March; 18:30 (UTC+11)	Report; Stats	Scoring by quarter: 17-7, 24-4, 17-8, 22-7			Umpires: Marion Johnson-Hurley; Michelle Phippard; Reserve umpire: Anne Abraitis
Sunday 19 March; 18:30 (UTC+11)	Report; Stats	Irene van Dyk 32/35 (91%); Maria Tutaia 32/38 (84%); Jessica Tuki 9/13 (69%); Belinda Colling 7/8 (88%)		Taraima Rara 10/15 (67%); Matelita Shaw 9/12 (75%); Laniana Tuisasa 6/8 (75%); Maria Bereso 1/4 (25%)	Umpires: Marion Johnson-Hurley; Michelle Phippard; Reserve umpire: Anne Abraitis

=== Day 4 ===
Monday 20 March; 13:00 (UTC+11)	Stats	Fiji	52–53	Malawi	Umpires: Jackie Jashari; Bobbi Brown; Reserve umpire: Sharon Kelly
Monday 20 March; 13:00 (UTC+11)	Stats	Scoring by quarter: 12-13, 15-12, 14-16, 11-12			Umpires: Jackie Jashari; Bobbi Brown; Reserve umpire: Sharon Kelly
Monday 20 March; 13:00 (UTC+11)	Stats	Taraima Rara 28/35 (80%); Matelita Shaw 24/27 (89%)		Linda Magombo 33/35 (94%); Mary Waya 20/24 (83%)	Umpires: Jackie Jashari; Bobbi Brown; Reserve umpire: Sharon Kelly

Monday 20 March; 18:30 (UTC+11)	Report; Stats	England	78–18	Saint Vincent and the Grenadines	Umpires: Stacey Campton; Amanda Nottingham; Reserve umpire: Carolene Logan
Monday 20 March; 18:30 (UTC+11)	Report; Stats	Scoring by quarter: 20-6, 23-3, 19-6, 16-3			Umpires: Stacey Campton; Amanda Nottingham; Reserve umpire: Carolene Logan
Monday 20 March; 18:30 (UTC+11)	Report; Stats	Louisa Brownfield 26/30 (87%); Abby Teare 16/20 (80%); Rachel Dunn 14/15 (93%); Pamela Cookey 13/17 (76%); Ama Agbeze 9/17 (53%)		Samathea Christopher 14/19 (74%); Nicole Sandy 2/5 (40%); Galeine Gordon 2/7 (29%)	Umpires: Stacey Campton; Amanda Nottingham; Reserve umpire: Carolene Logan

=== Day 5 ===
Tuesday 21 March; 13:00 (UTC+11)	Stats	Saint Vincent and the Grenadines	44–66	Malawi	Umpires: Michelle Phippard; Jacqui Jashari; Reserve umpire: Amanda Nottingham
Tuesday 21 March; 13:00 (UTC+11)	Stats	Scoring by quarter: 8-19, 14-17, 9-14, 13-16			Umpires: Michelle Phippard; Jacqui Jashari; Reserve umpire: Amanda Nottingham
Tuesday 21 March; 13:00 (UTC+11)	Stats	Galeine Gordon 36/40 (90%); Nicole Sandy 5/8 (63%); Leeanna Lewis 3/6 (50%)		Linda Magombo 48/50 (96%); Emma Mzagada 15/19 (79%); Mary Waya 3/4 (75%)	Umpires: Michelle Phippard; Jacqui Jashari; Reserve umpire: Amanda Nottingham

Tuesday 21 March; 18:30 (UTC+11)	Report; Stats	New Zealand	74–37	South Africa	Umpires: Carolene Logan; Chris Campbell; Reserve umpire: Marion Johnson-Hurley
Tuesday 21 March; 18:30 (UTC+11)	Report; Stats	Scoring by quarter: 23-11, 23-5, 14-11, 14-10			Umpires: Carolene Logan; Chris Campbell; Reserve umpire: Marion Johnson-Hurley
Tuesday 21 March; 18:30 (UTC+11)	Report; Stats	Irene van Dyk 44/48 (92%); Belinda Colling 16/21 (76%); Maria Tutaia 14/19 (74%)		Sindisiwe Gumede 30/35 (86%); Christine Markgraaff 6/8 (75%); Lizanne Helmand 1/3 (33%)	Umpires: Carolene Logan; Chris Campbell; Reserve umpire: Marion Johnson-Hurley

=== Day 6 ===
Wednesday 22 March; 15:00 (UTC+11)	Stats	South Africa	56–51	Fiji	Umpires: Michelle Phippard; Marion Johnson-Hurley; Reserve umpire: Anne Abraitis
Wednesday 22 March; 15:00 (UTC+11)	Stats	Scoring by quarter: 14-7, 15-14, 12-12, 15-18			Umpires: Michelle Phippard; Marion Johnson-Hurley; Reserve umpire: Anne Abraitis
Wednesday 22 March; 15:00 (UTC+11)	Stats	Sindisiwe Gumede 40/46 (87%); Lizanne Helmand 10/13 (77%); Christine Markgraaff 6/6 (100%)		Matelita Shaw 29/35 (83%); Taraima Rara 20/23 (87%); Maria Bereso 2/4 (50%)	Umpires: Michelle Phippard; Marion Johnson-Hurley; Reserve umpire: Anne Abraitis

Wednesday 22 March; 20:30 (UTC+11)	Report; Stats	New Zealand	55–40	England	Umpires: Sharon Kelly; Chris Campbell; Reserve umpire: Jacqui Jashari
Wednesday 22 March; 20:30 (UTC+11)	Report; Stats	Scoring by quarter: 15-9, 12-12, 15-10, 13-9			Umpires: Sharon Kelly; Chris Campbell; Reserve umpire: Jacqui Jashari
Wednesday 22 March; 20:30 (UTC+11)	Report; Stats	Irene van Dyk 46/49 (94%); Belinda Colling 9/12 (75%)		Louisa Brownfield 17/18 (94%); Pamela Cookey 14/20 (70%); Abby Teare 5/9 (56%); Rachel Dunn 4/5 (80%)	Umpires: Sharon Kelly; Chris Campbell; Reserve umpire: Jacqui Jashari

=== Day 7 ===
Thursday 23 March; 11:00 (UTC+11)	Stats	Fiji	58–44	Saint Vincent and the Grenadines	Umpires: Bobbi Brown; Stacey Campton; Reserve umpire: Pauline Sciascia
Thursday 23 March; 11:00 (UTC+11)	Stats	Scoring by quarter: 13-10, 15-12, 16-11, 14-11			Umpires: Bobbi Brown; Stacey Campton; Reserve umpire: Pauline Sciascia
Thursday 23 March; 11:00 (UTC+11)	Stats	Matelita Shaw 32/38 (84%); Laniana Tuisasa 26/28 (93%)		Galeine Gordon 26/33 (79%); Samathea Christopher 15/16 (94%); Nicole Sandy 3/5 (60%)	Umpires: Bobbi Brown; Stacey Campton; Reserve umpire: Pauline Sciascia

Thursday 23 March; 16:00 (UTC+11)	Stats	Malawi	39–67	New Zealand	Umpires: Bill Alexander; Anne Abraitis; Reserve umpire: Marion Johnson-Hurley
Thursday 23 March; 16:00 (UTC+11)	Stats	Scoring by quarter: 10-18, 7-19, 6-20, 16-10			Umpires: Bill Alexander; Anne Abraitis; Reserve umpire: Marion Johnson-Hurley
Thursday 23 March; 16:00 (UTC+11)	Stats	Linda Magombo 36/42 (86%); Emma Mzagada 2/4 (50%); Peace Chawinga 1/2 (50%)		Irene van Dyk 38/43 (88%); Maria Tutaia 19/21 (90%); Belinda Colling 6/6 (100%); Jessica Tuki 4/9 (44%)	Umpires: Bill Alexander; Anne Abraitis; Reserve umpire: Marion Johnson-Hurley

Thursday 23 March; 19:00 (UTC+11)	Report; Stats	South Africa	35–67	England	Umpires: Pauline Sciascia; Michelle Phippard; Reserve umpire: Stacey Campton
Thursday 23 March; 19:00 (UTC+11)	Report; Stats	Scoring by quarter: 8-17, 13-12, 8-18, 6-20			Umpires: Pauline Sciascia; Michelle Phippard; Reserve umpire: Stacey Campton
Thursday 23 March; 19:00 (UTC+11)	Report; Stats	Sindisiwe Gumede 27/33 (82%); Christine Markgraaff 6/9 (67%); Lizanne Helmand 2/7 (29%)		Louisa Brownfield 47/53 (89%); Abby Teare 12/17 (71%); Pamela Cookey 8/10 (80%)	Umpires: Pauline Sciascia; Michelle Phippard; Reserve umpire: Stacey Campton

=== Final table ===
Pos	Team	P	W	D	L	GF	GA	GD	Pts
1	New Zealand	5	5	0	0	374	173	+201	10
2	England	5	4	0	1	308	196	+112	8
3	Malawi	5	3	0	2	262	282	-20	6
4	South Africa	5	2	0	3	264	283	-19	4
5	Fiji	5	1	0	4	228	293	-65	2
6	Saint Vincent and the Grenadines	5	0	0	5	171	380	-209	0

Qualified for Semi-finals
Qualified for Classification

== Pool 2 ==
All Pool 2 matches were hosted at the State Netball Hockey Centre.

=== Day 1 ===
Friday 17 March; 13:00 (UTC+11)	Stats	Jamaica	67–22	Singapore	Umpires: Sharon Kelly; Marion Johnson-Hurley; Reserve umpire: Amanda Nottingham
Friday 17 March; 13:00 (UTC+11)	Stats	Scoring by quarter: 19-7, 15-8, 18-5, 15-2			Umpires: Sharon Kelly; Marion Johnson-Hurley; Reserve umpire: Amanda Nottingham
Friday 17 March; 13:00 (UTC+11)	Stats	Elaine Davis 25/32 (78%); Latoya Thomas 23/26 (88%); Simone Forbes 11/14 (79%); Jodi Ann Ffrench 8/10 (80%)		Tan Hui Yan 10/14 (71%); Li Ling 7/10 (70%); Chen Hui Fen 3/5 (60%); Jeanine Heng Wei Ping 2/5 (40%)	Umpires: Sharon Kelly; Marion Johnson-Hurley; Reserve umpire: Amanda Nottingham

Friday 17 March; 20:30 (UTC+11)	Report; Stats	Wales	22–78	Australia	Umpires: Pauline Sciascia; Chris Campbell; Reserve umpire: Bobbi Brown
Friday 17 March; 20:30 (UTC+11)	Report; Stats	Scoring by quarter: 4-17, 7-22, 7-19, 4-20			Umpires: Pauline Sciascia; Chris Campbell; Reserve umpire: Bobbi Brown
Friday 17 March; 20:30 (UTC+11)	Report; Stats	Rebecca James 13/22 (59%); Rhiannon Ace 5/9 (56%); Nicola Lewis 3/7 (43%); Jamilla Abbott 1/3 (33%)		Susan Pratley 25/27 (93%); Sharelle McMahon 20/20 (100%); Catherine Cox 20/28 (71%); Megan Dehn 13/16 (81%)	Umpires: Pauline Sciascia; Chris Campbell; Reserve umpire: Bobbi Brown

=== Day 2 ===
Saturday 18 March; 15:00 (UTC+11)	Stats	Singapore	33–76	Samoa	Umpires: Michelle Phippard; Carolene Logan; Reserve umpire: Jacqui Jashari
Saturday 18 March; 15:00 (UTC+11)	Stats	Scoring by quarter: 6-21, 10-18, 9-16, 8-21			Umpires: Michelle Phippard; Carolene Logan; Reserve umpire: Jacqui Jashari
Saturday 18 March; 15:00 (UTC+11)	Stats	Jeanine Heng Wei Ping 12/15 (80%); Li Ling 9/11 (82%); Tan Hui Yan 8/8 (100%); Pearline Chan 2/2 (100%); Chen Hui Fen 2/4 (50%)		Cathrine Latu 44/51 (86%); Monika Fuimaono 15/16 (94%); Malu Fa'asavalu 13/17 (76%); Ida Vaai 3/7 (43%); Monalisa Tofilau 1/1 (100%)	Umpires: Michelle Phippard; Carolene Logan; Reserve umpire: Jacqui Jashari

Saturday 18 March; 18:30 (UTC+11)	Stats	Jamaica	69–30	Barbados	Umpires: Bobbi Brown; Sharon Kelly; Reserve umpire: Stacey Campton
Saturday 18 March; 18:30 (UTC+11)	Stats	Scoring by quarter: 22-5, 18-5, 15-9, 14-11			Umpires: Bobbi Brown; Sharon Kelly; Reserve umpire: Stacey Campton
Saturday 18 March; 18:30 (UTC+11)	Stats	Latoya Thomas 25/32 (78%); Elaine Davis 22/28 (79%); Simone Forbes 22/30 (73%)		Lydia Bishop 18/26 (69%); Laurel Browne 12/18 (67%)	Umpires: Bobbi Brown; Sharon Kelly; Reserve umpire: Stacey Campton

=== Day 3 ===
Sunday 19 March; 13:00 (UTC+11)	Report; Stats	Australia	70–27	Barbados	Umpires: Bronwyn Meek; Bill Alexander; Reserve umpire: Bobbi Brown
Sunday 19 March; 13:00 (UTC+11)	Report; Stats	Scoring by quarter: 22-6, 16-6, 15-10, 17-5			Umpires: Bronwyn Meek; Bill Alexander; Reserve umpire: Bobbi Brown
Sunday 19 March; 13:00 (UTC+11)	Report; Stats	Catherine Cox 30/37 (81%); Susan Pratley 20/21 (95%); Sharelle McMahon 15/17 (88%); Megan Dehn 5/9 (56%)		Lydia Bishop 14/23 (61%); Laurel Browne 13/15 (87%)	Umpires: Bronwyn Meek; Bill Alexander; Reserve umpire: Bobbi Brown

Sunday 19 March; 20:30 (UTC+11)	Report; Stats	Samoa	49–42	Wales	Umpires: Stacey Campton; Amanda Nottingham; Reserve umpire: Jacqui Jashari
Sunday 19 March; 20:30 (UTC+11)	Report; Stats	Scoring by quarter: 17-10, 9-15, 12-7, 11-10			Umpires: Stacey Campton; Amanda Nottingham; Reserve umpire: Jacqui Jashari
Sunday 19 March; 20:30 (UTC+11)	Report; Stats	Cathrine Latu 40/44 (91%); Malu Fa'asavalu 9/16 (56%); Aloma Inu 0/1 (0%)		Rebecca James 31/41 (76%); Amanda Evans 11/18 (61%)	Umpires: Stacey Campton; Amanda Nottingham; Reserve umpire: Jacqui Jashari

=== Day 4 ===
Monday 20 March; 15:00 (UTC+11)	Stats	Jamaica	74–21	Wales	Umpires: Anne Abraitis; Pauline Sciascia; Reserve umpire: Marion Johnson-Hurley
Monday 20 March; 15:00 (UTC+11)	Stats	Scoring by quarter: 21-2, 22-4, 15-7, 16-8			Umpires: Anne Abraitis; Pauline Sciascia; Reserve umpire: Marion Johnson-Hurley
Monday 20 March; 15:00 (UTC+11)	Stats	Elaine Davis 46/56 (82%); Simone Forbes 24/26 (92%); Jodi Ann Ffrench 4/5 (80%)		Rebecca James 16/24 (67%); Nicola Lewis 4/6 (67%); Jamilla Abbott 1/1 (100%)	Umpires: Anne Abraitis; Pauline Sciascia; Reserve umpire: Marion Johnson-Hurley

Monday 20 March; 20:30 (UTC+11)	Stats	Barbados	51–40	Singapore	Umpires: Bronwyn Meek; Michelle Phippard; Reserve umpire: Bill Alexander
Monday 20 March; 20:30 (UTC+11)	Stats	Scoring by quarter: 7-14, 15-9, 17-8, 12-9			Umpires: Bronwyn Meek; Michelle Phippard; Reserve umpire: Bill Alexander
Monday 20 March; 20:30 (UTC+11)	Stats	Laurel Browne 37/40 (93%); Lydia Bishop 14/20 (70%)		Tan Hui Yan 22/32 (69%); Li Ling 14/19 (74%); Jeanine Heng Wei Ping 4/7 (57%)	Umpires: Bronwyn Meek; Michelle Phippard; Reserve umpire: Bill Alexander

=== Day 5 ===
Tuesday 21 March; 15:00 (UTC+11)	Report; Stats	Australia	78–47	Samoa	Umpires: Anne Abraitis; Bobbi Brown; Reserve umpire: Pauline Sciascia
Tuesday 21 March; 15:00 (UTC+11)	Report; Stats	Scoring by quarter: 23-9, 23-14, 14-11, 18-13			Umpires: Anne Abraitis; Bobbi Brown; Reserve umpire: Pauline Sciascia
Tuesday 21 March; 15:00 (UTC+11)	Report; Stats	Susan Pratley 28/30 (93%); Catherine Cox 20/25 (80%); Sharelle McMahon 18/20 (90%); Megan Dehn 12/13 (92%)		Monika Fuimaono 27/36 (75%); Malu Fa'asavalu 13/21 (62%); Cathrine Latu 7/10 (70%)	Umpires: Anne Abraitis; Bobbi Brown; Reserve umpire: Pauline Sciascia

Tuesday 21 March; 20:30 (UTC+11)	Stats	Wales	45–36	Singapore	Umpires: Bill Alexander; Stacey Campton; Reserve umpire: Sharon Kelly
Tuesday 21 March; 20:30 (UTC+11)	Stats	Scoring by quarter: 11-8, 12-6, 13-8, 9-14			Umpires: Bill Alexander; Stacey Campton; Reserve umpire: Sharon Kelly
Tuesday 21 March; 20:30 (UTC+11)	Stats	Rhiannon Ace 22/30 (73%); Rebecca James 13/19 (68%); Jamilla Abbott 10/20 (50%); Nicola Lewis 0/1 (0%)		Tan Hui Yan 24/31 (77%); Jeanine Heng Wei Ping 11/13 (85%); Li Ling 1/7 (14%)	Umpires: Bill Alexander; Stacey Campton; Reserve umpire: Sharon Kelly

=== Day 6 ===
Wednesday 22 March; 13:00 (UTC+11)	Stats	Samoa	45–41	Barbados	Umpires: Stacey Campton; Pauline Sciascia; Reserve umpire: Carolene Logan
Wednesday 22 March; 13:00 (UTC+11)	Stats	Scoring by quarter: 13-9, 13-7, 12-14, 8-11			Umpires: Stacey Campton; Pauline Sciascia; Reserve umpire: Carolene Logan
Wednesday 22 March; 13:00 (UTC+11)	Stats	Monika Fuimaono 28/41 (68%); Malu Fa'asavalu 17/23 (74%)		Lydia Bishop 27/33 (82%); Latonia Blackman 7/8 (88%); Laurel Browne 7/11 (64%)	Umpires: Stacey Campton; Pauline Sciascia; Reserve umpire: Carolene Logan

Wednesday 22 March; 18:30 (UTC+11)	Report; Stats	Australia	54–54	Jamaica	Umpires: Bronwyn Meek; Amanda Nottingham; Reserve umpire: Bobbi Brown
Wednesday 22 March; 18:30 (UTC+11)	Report; Stats	Scoring by quarter: 16-11, 11-13, 16-10, 11-20			Umpires: Bronwyn Meek; Amanda Nottingham; Reserve umpire: Bobbi Brown
Wednesday 22 March; 18:30 (UTC+11)	Report; Stats	Sharelle McMahon 27/33 (82%); Susan Pratley 14/18 (78%); Catherine Cox 13/17 (76%)		Elaine Davis 37/40 (93%); Simone Forbes 17/19 (89%)	Umpires: Bronwyn Meek; Amanda Nottingham; Reserve umpire: Bobbi Brown

=== Day 7 ===
Thursday 23 March; 09:00 (UTC+11)	Stats	Barbados	34–55	Wales	Umpires: Jacqui Jashari; Sharon Kelly; Reserve umpire: Chris Campbell
Thursday 23 March; 09:00 (UTC+11)	Stats	Scoring by quarter: 8-15, 8-13, 9-13, 9-14			Umpires: Jacqui Jashari; Sharon Kelly; Reserve umpire: Chris Campbell
Thursday 23 March; 09:00 (UTC+11)	Stats	Lydia Bishop 21/24 (88%); Latonia Blackman 8/15 (53%); Laurel Browne 5/5 (100%)		Rebecca James 38/43 (88%); Rhiannon Ace 17/28 (61%)	Umpires: Jacqui Jashari; Sharon Kelly; Reserve umpire: Chris Campbell

Thursday 23 March; 14:00 (UTC+11)	Report; Stats	Singapore	19–107	Australia	Umpires: Carolene Logan; Chris Campbell; Reserve umpire: Bronwyn Meek
Thursday 23 March; 14:00 (UTC+11)	Report; Stats	Scoring by quarter: 4-25, 4-28, 4-26, 7-28			Umpires: Carolene Logan; Chris Campbell; Reserve umpire: Bronwyn Meek
Thursday 23 March; 14:00 (UTC+11)	Report; Stats	Tan Hui Yan 9/18 (50%); Jeanine Heng Wei Ping 5/9 (56%); Li Ling 4/5 (80%); Chen Hui Fen 1/2 (50%); Tan Lee Hiang Wendy 0/1 (0%)		Catherine Cox 44/51 (86%); Megan Dehn 35/42 (83%); Sharelle McMahon 17/20 (85%); Susan Pratley 11/11 (100%)	Umpires: Carolene Logan; Chris Campbell; Reserve umpire: Bronwyn Meek

Thursday 23 March; 21:00 (UTC+11)	Stats	Samoa	47–60	Jamaica	Umpires: Bronwyn Meek; Marion Johnson-Hurley; Reserve umpire: Amanda Nottingham
Thursday 23 March; 21:00 (UTC+11)	Stats	Scoring by quarter: 13-19, 13-16, 14-12, 7-13			Umpires: Bronwyn Meek; Marion Johnson-Hurley; Reserve umpire: Amanda Nottingham
Thursday 23 March; 21:00 (UTC+11)	Stats	Cathrine Latu 45/49 (92%); Malu Fa'asavalu 2/6 (33%)		Elaine Davis 43/46 (93%); Simone Forbes 17/18 (94%)	Umpires: Bronwyn Meek; Marion Johnson-Hurley; Reserve umpire: Amanda Nottingham

=== Final table ===
Pos	Team	P	W	D	L	GF	GA	GD	Pts
1	Australia	5	4	1	0	387	169	+218	9
2	Jamaica	5	4	1	0	324	174	+150	9
3	Samoa	5	3	0	2	264	254	+10	6
4	Wales	5	2	0	3	185	271	-86	4
5	Barbados	5	2	0	3	183	279	-96	4
6	Singapore	5	0	0	5	150	346	-196	0

Qualified for Semi-finals
Qualified for Classification

== Classification ==
All the classification matches were hosted at the State Netball Hockey Centre.

=== 11th/12th playoff ===
Friday 24 March; 13:00 (UTC+11)	Stats	Singapore	46–52	Saint Vincent and the Grenadines	Umpires: Chris Campbell; Marion Johnson-Hurley; Reserve umpire: Carolene Logan
Friday 24 March; 13:00 (UTC+11)	Stats	Scoring by quarter: 15-12, 10-10, 13-15, 8-15			Umpires: Chris Campbell; Marion Johnson-Hurley; Reserve umpire: Carolene Logan
Friday 24 March; 13:00 (UTC+11)	Stats	Tan Hui Yan 30/50 (60%); Jeanine Heng Wei Ping 9/15 (60%); Li Ling 7/9 (78%)		Galeine Gordon 27/32 (84%); Samathea Christopher 22/23 (96%); Nicole Sandy 3/4 (75%)	Umpires: Chris Campbell; Marion Johnson-Hurley; Reserve umpire: Carolene Logan

=== 9th/10th playoff ===
Friday 24 March; 18:30 (UTC+11)	Report; Stats	Fiji	69–45	Barbados	Umpires: Amanda Nottingham; Jacqui Jashari; Reserve umpire: Bill Alexander
Friday 24 March; 18:30 (UTC+11)	Report; Stats	Scoring by quarter: 17-10, 17-6, 18-15, 17-14			Umpires: Amanda Nottingham; Jacqui Jashari; Reserve umpire: Bill Alexander
Friday 24 March; 18:30 (UTC+11)	Report; Stats	Taraima Rara 50/55 (91%); Matelita Shaw 19/24 (79%)		Lydia Bishop 24/31 (77%); Wanda Agard-Belgrave 16/20 (80%); Laurel Browne 4/5 (80%); Denise Alleyne 1/1 (100%)	Umpires: Amanda Nottingham; Jacqui Jashari; Reserve umpire: Bill Alexander

=== 7th/8th playoff ===
Friday 24 March; 15:00 (UTC+11)	Report; Stats	South Africa	46–43	Wales	Umpires: Chris Campbell; Bobbi Brown; Reserve umpire: Anne Abraitis
Friday 24 March; 15:00 (UTC+11)	Report; Stats	Scoring by quarter: 11-15, 11-10, 12-9, 12-9			Umpires: Chris Campbell; Bobbi Brown; Reserve umpire: Anne Abraitis
Friday 24 March; 15:00 (UTC+11)	Report; Stats	Christine Markgraaff 28/38 (74%); Sindisiwe Gumede 11/11 (100%); Lizanne Helmand 6/12 (50%); Nthabiseng Moabi 1/1 (100%)		Rebecca James 31/41 (76%); Rhiannon Ace 12/19 (63%)	Umpires: Chris Campbell; Bobbi Brown; Reserve umpire: Anne Abraitis

=== 5th/6th playoff ===
Friday 24 March; 20:30 (UTC+11)	Report; Stats	Samoa	53–50	Malawi	Umpires: Michelle Phippard; Pauline Sciascia; Reserve umpire: Stacey Campton
Friday 24 March; 20:30 (UTC+11)	Report; Stats	Scoring by quarter: 16-8, 12-15, 17-11, 8-16			Umpires: Michelle Phippard; Pauline Sciascia; Reserve umpire: Stacey Campton
Friday 24 March; 20:30 (UTC+11)	Report; Stats	Monika Fuimaono 43/52 (83%); Malu Fa'asavalu 10/15 (67%)		Linda Magombo 44/50 (88%); Emma Mzagada 3/3 (100%); Peace Chawinga 3/10 (30%)	Umpires: Michelle Phippard; Pauline Sciascia; Reserve umpire: Stacey Campton

== Medal round ==
All the medal round matches were hosted at the Melbourne Multi Purpose Venue.

=== Semifinals ===
Saturday 25 March; 18:30 (UTC+11)	Report; Stats	New Zealand	61–41	Jamaica	Umpires: Sharon Kelly; Michelle Phippard; Reserve umpire: Jacqui Jashari
Saturday 25 March; 18:30 (UTC+11)	Report; Stats	Scoring by quarter: 18-7, 14-10, 16-11, 13-13			Umpires: Sharon Kelly; Michelle Phippard; Reserve umpire: Jacqui Jashari
Saturday 25 March; 18:30 (UTC+11)	Report; Stats	Irene van Dyk 48/51 (94%); Belinda Colling 10/14 (71%); Maria Tutaia 3/5 (60%)		Elaine Davis 27/31 (87%); Simone Forbes 14/18 (78%)	Umpires: Sharon Kelly; Michelle Phippard; Reserve umpire: Jacqui Jashari

Saturday 25 March; 20:30 (UTC+11	Report; Stats	Australia	52–40	England	Umpires: Amanda Nottingham; Chris Campbell; Reserve umpire: Bronwyn Meek
Saturday 25 March; 20:30 (UTC+11	Report; Stats	Scoring by quarter: 14-8, 11-9, 10-7, 17-16			Umpires: Amanda Nottingham; Chris Campbell; Reserve umpire: Bronwyn Meek
Saturday 25 March; 20:30 (UTC+11	Report; Stats	Sharelle McMahon 27/31 (87%); Susan Pratley 15/18 (83%); Catherine Cox 10/14 (71%)		Abby Teare 15/24 (63%); Louisa Brownfield 9/14 (64%); Pamela Cookey 9/15 (60%); Rachel Dunn 7/11 (64%)	Umpires: Amanda Nottingham; Chris Campbell; Reserve umpire: Bronwyn Meek

=== Bronze medal match ===
Sunday 26 March; 14:00 (UTC+11)	Stats	Jamaica	52–53	England	Umpires: Sharon Kelly; Amanda Nottingham; Reserve umpire: Michelle Phippard
Sunday 26 March; 14:00 (UTC+11)	Stats	Scoring by quarter: 18-10, 11-12, 11-16, 12-15			Umpires: Sharon Kelly; Amanda Nottingham; Reserve umpire: Michelle Phippard
Sunday 26 March; 14:00 (UTC+11)	Stats	Elaine Davis 46/52 (88%); Simone Forbes 6/9 (67%)		Abby Teare 30/36 (83%); Pamela Cookey 17/29 (59%); Rachel Dunn 6/10 (60%)	Umpires: Sharon Kelly; Amanda Nottingham; Reserve umpire: Michelle Phippard

=== Gold medal game ===
Sunday 26 March; 16:00 (UTC+11)	Stats	New Zealand	60–55	Australia	Umpires: Chris Campbell; Marion Johnson-Hurley; Reserve umpire: Bill Alexander
Sunday 26 March; 16:00 (UTC+11)	Stats	Scoring by quarter: 19-14, 17-15, 10-12, 14-14			Umpires: Chris Campbell; Marion Johnson-Hurley; Reserve umpire: Bill Alexander
Sunday 26 March; 16:00 (UTC+11)	Stats	Irene van Dyk 44/49 (90%); Belinda Colling 16/18 (89%)		Catherine Cox 31/38 (82%); Sharelle McMahon 22/28 (79%); Susan Pratley 2/2 (100%)	Umpires: Chris Campbell; Marion Johnson-Hurley; Reserve umpire: Bill Alexander

== Statistics ==
=== Team stats ===
Total Goals

Rk	Team	MP	S/A	%	REA
1	NZL	7	495/571	87	32
2	JAM	7	417/492	85	25
3	AUS	7	494/586	84	33
4	MAW	6	312/370	84	28
5	FIJ	6	297/361	82	16

Goals from MPW

Rk	Team	MP	S/A	%
1	NZL	7	152/170	89
2	AUS	7	153/175	87
3	MAW	6	64/74	86
4	FIJ	6	75/90	83
5	VIN	6	62/75	83

Match Play Winners

Rk	Team	MP	INT	DEF	RED	Total	Avg
1	AUS	7	85	55	45	185	26.4
2	NZL	7	97	52	29	178	25.4
3	ENG	7	83	58	28	169	24.1
4	RSA	6	70	34	33	137	22.8
5	JAM	7	75	27	49	151	21.6

Penalties

Rk	Team	MP	CON	OBS	Total	Avg
1	WAL	6	221	98	319	53.2
2	NZL	7	258	119	377	53.9
3	FIJ	6	253	71	324	54.0
4	RSA	6	243	82	325	54.2
5	BAR	6	237	88	325	54.2

Match Play Errors

Rk	Team	MP	STP	BP	HB	BCP	Total	Avg	OGE
1	NZL	7	12	102	2	6	122	17.4	34
2	SAM	6	8	57	6	11	112	18.7	46
3	AUS	7	10	118	4	8	140	20.0	26
4	SIN	6	13	104	10	3	130	21.7	75
5	FIJ	6	14	115	12	7	148	24.7	47

Key: Rk - Rank, MP - Matches Played, SUS - Suspended Player, S - Success, A - Attempt, % - Goaling Percentage, MPW - Match Play Winner, INT - Intercept, DEF - Deflection, REA - Rebound Attack, RED - Rebound Defense, CON - Contact, OBS - Obstruction, STP - Stepping, BP - Bad Pass, HB - Held Ball, BCP - Breaking Centre Pass, OGE - Opposition Goal from Error

=== Individual stats ===
Total Goals

Rk	Player	Team	MP	Goals/%	REA
1	Irene van Dyk	NZL	7	300/324 (93%)	20
2	Elaine Davis	JAM	7	246/285 (86%)	17
3	Linda Magombo	MAW	6	225/254 (89%)	19
4	Sindisiwe Gumede	RSA	6	192/229 (84%)	21
5	Catherine Cox	AUS	7	168/210 (80%)	10

Goals from MPW

Rk	Player	Team	MP	S/A	%
1	Irene van Dyk	NZL	7	89/95	94
2	Sindisiwe Gumede	RSA	6	61/68	90
3	Elaine Davis	JAM	7	59/72	82
4	Sharelle McMahon	AUS	7	45/48	94
5	Catherine Cox	AUS	7	44/57	77

Feed to Shooter

Rk	Player	Team	MP	Total	Avg
1	Peace Chawinga	MAW	6	188	31.3
2	Adine Wilson	NZL	7	170	24.3
3	Frances Solia	SAM	6	144	24.0
4	Nadine Bryan	JAM	7	156	22.3
5	Karen Atkinson	ENG	7	146	20.9

Match Play Winners

Rk	Player	Team	MP	INT	DEF	RED	Total	Avg
1	Wanda Agard-Belgrave	BAR	6	16	8	33	57	9.5
2	Kasey Evering	JAM	7	22	8	31	61	8.7
3	Sara Hale	WAL	6	20	14	10	44	7.3
4	Vilimaina Davu	NZL	6	17	8	14	39	6.5
4	Esther Nkhoma	MAW	6	11	6	22	39	6.5
4	Leigh-Ann Zackey	RSA	6	19	9	11	39	6.5

Notes

- ^1 Nicole Aiken (Jamaica) finished with an average 8.0 MPWs but only played two games.

Key: Rk - Rank, MP - Matches Played, SUS - Suspended Player, S - Success, A - Attempt, % - Goaling Percentage, MPW - Match Play Winner, INT - Intercept, DEF - Deflection, REA - Rebound Attack, RED - Rebound Defense

== Medallists ==
Gold	Silver	Bronze
New Zealand; Coach: Ruth Aitken	Australia; Coach: Norma Plummer	England; Coach: Margaret Caldow
Leana de Bruin; Belinda Colling; Vilimaina Davu; Temepara George; Laura Langman; Jessica Tuki; Anna Rowberry; Anna Scarlett; Maria Tutaia; Irene van Dyk; Casey Williams; Adine Wilson (c)	Megan Dehn; Natalie Avellino; Alison Broadbent; Bianca Chatfield; Catherine Cox (vc); Susan Fuhrmann; Selina Gilsenan; Janine Ilitch; Sharelle McMahon (c); Susan Pratley; Jessica Shynn; Natalie von Bertouch	Ama Agbeze; Karen Atkinson; Louisa Brownfield; Jade Clarke; Pamela Cookey; Rachel Dunn; Chioma Ezeogu; Geva Mentor; Sonia Mkoloma; Olivia Murphy (c); Naomi Stenhouse; Abby Teare

== Final Placings ==
Rank	Team
1st place, gold medalist(s)	New Zealand
2nd place, silver medalist(s)	Australia
3rd place, bronze medalist(s)	England
4	Jamaica
5	Samoa
6	Malawi
7	South Africa
8	Wales
9	Fiji
10	Barbados
11	Saint Vincent and the Grenadines
12	Singapore
