= Maria Folau =

New Zealand netball player

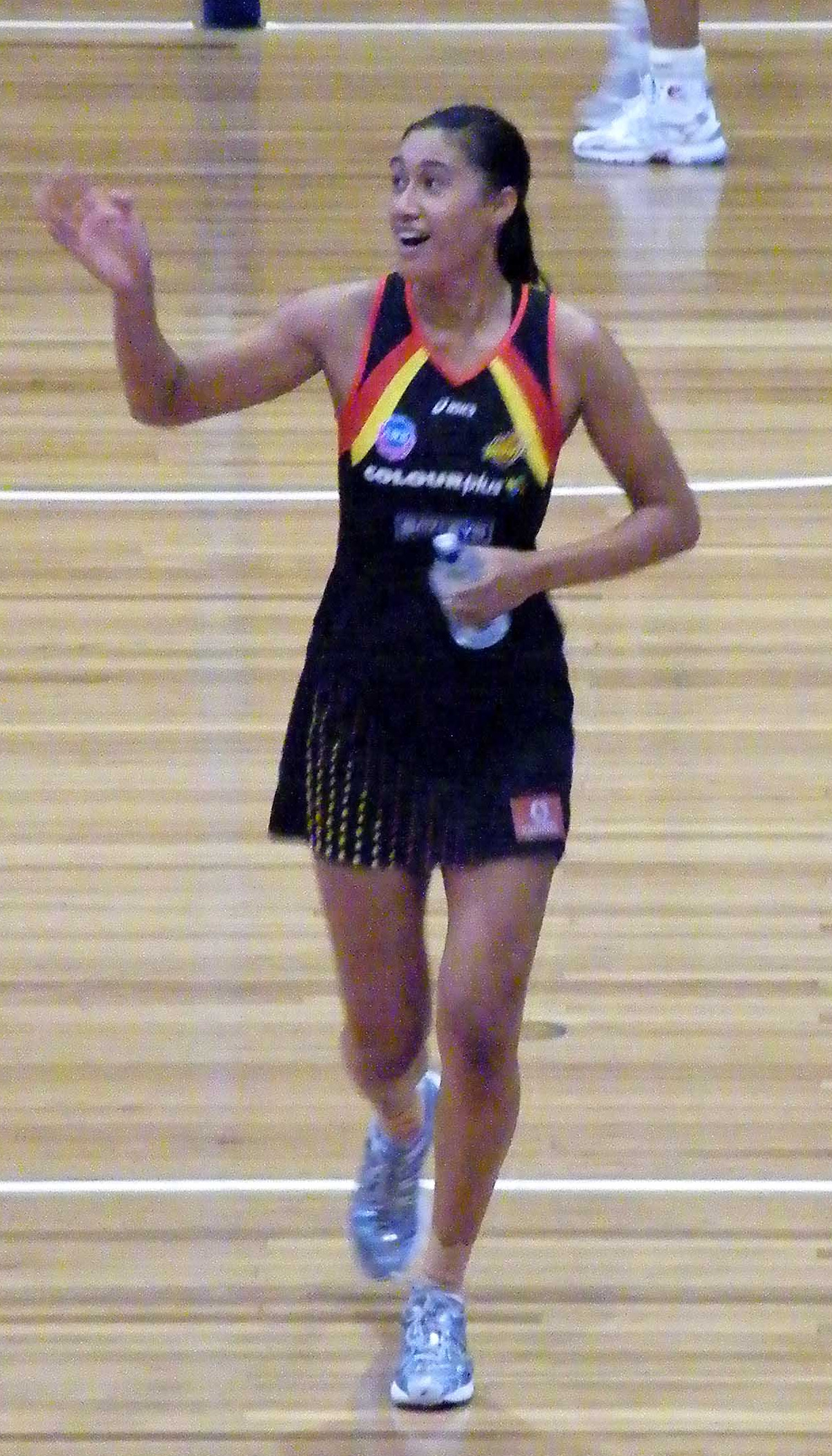
- Playing for the Waikato Bay of Plenty Magic in 2009

Personal information
- Born: Solonaima Maria Tuta'ia; 18 February 1987 (age 39) Tokoroa, New Zealand
- Height: 1.88 m (6 ft 2 in)
- Spouse: Israel Folau (m. 2017)
- Relatives: Siliva Siliva (2nd cousin); Faifili Levave
- School: Lynfield College; Mount Albert Grammar School; Blockhouse Bay Intermediate

Netball career
- Playing positions: GA, GS
Years	Club team	Apps
2005–07	Auckland Diamonds	
2008–09	Waikato Bay of Plenty Magic	31
2010–18	Northern Mystics	164
2019	Adelaide Thunderbirds	13
Years	National team	Caps
2005–19	New Zealand	150
Medal record
Representing New Zealand
Netball World Championships
Silver medal – second place	2007 Auckland	Netball
Silver medal – second place	2011 Singapore	Netball
Silver medal – second place	2015 Sydney	Netball
Gold medal – first place	2019 Liverpool	Netball
Commonwealth Games
Gold medal – first place	2006 Melbourne	Netball
Gold medal – first place	2010 Delhi	Netball
Silver medal – second place	2014 Glasgow	Netball
World Netball Series
Gold medal – first place	2009 Manchester	Fastnet
Silver medal – second place	2011 Liverpool	Fastnet
Gold medal – first place	2012 Auckland	Fast5
Gold medal – first place	2013 Auckland	Fast5
Gold medal – first place	2016 Melbourne	Fast5
- Updated on 22 July 2019

Solonaima Maria Folau (née Tuta'ia; born 18 February 1987 in Tokoroa, New Zealand) is a retired New Zealand netball player. She played regularly for the New Zealand national netball team, the Silver Ferns.

== Early life ==
Folau was born Solonaima Maria Tuta'ia in Tokoroa on 18 February 1987, the daughter of Fuisami Tuta'ia, a forestry worker, and his wife, Niukini, a homemaker, who in 1983 had moved to New Zealand from Samoa. She was named for her grandmothers, Solonaima and Malia, and she began using her middle name when she entered school as her teacher had difficulty pronouncing her first name. Maria Tuta'ia was an attendee of Lynfield College but in the final year of it, transferred to Mount Albert Grammar School. At MAGS, she became a captain of its first Premier Netball team, which under her command came fourth at the Upper North Island Secondary Schools tournament and New Zealand Secondary Schools' Championships respectively. In 2003, Folau was named in the New Zealand U21 squad and two years later she became part of the winning team that brought home the 2005 World Youth Cup from Miami. That year, she was called into the Silver Ferns team, making her on-court debut when the Ferns toured Jamaica.

== Career ==
=== Early career ===
Folau played domestic netball for the Auckland Diamonds during the National Bank Cup from 2005 to 2007. With the start of the ANZ Championship in 2008, she signed with the Waikato Bay of Plenty Magic, partnering Irene van Dyk in the shooting circle. She played with the Magic for two years, before transferring back to Auckland to play with the Northern Mystics, starting in 2010.

=== Later career ===
During her senior international career, Maria Folau has won gold medals at the 2010 Commonwealth Games, 2006 Commonwealth Games and the 2009 World Netball Series, in addition to a silver medal at the 2007 World Netball Championships.

In the 2010 ANZ Championship, Folau was the first and only player to be sent off during the match against the Swifts for persistent breaking. This send off happened in the last two minutes of the match and she took no further part in that match.

She is renowned for scoring the crucial goals, such as in the gold medal match against Australia at the 2010 Commonwealth Games, and during the 2011 ANZ Championship season when she scored the winning goal in the dying seconds against the Magic.

In 2014, Folau was inducted into the Mt. Albert Grammar School Hall of Fame.

In 2018 after playing for nine seasons with the Northern Mystics she joined Adelaide Thunderbirds of Suncorp Super Netball for the 2019 season. Folau was the leading goalscorer for the Thunderbirds and won the club's best and fairest award, though she parted ways with the club at the end of the season.

She represented New Zealand at the 2018 Commonwealth Games and 2019 Netball World Cup.

In December 2019, Netball New Zealand announced that Folau had retired from domestic and international netball. She finished her career with 150 caps for the Silver Ferns, the second-most capped player for her nation behind Laura Langman.

In February 2022 it was reported that the Queensland Firebirds were in discussions with Folau.

== Personal life ==
Folau is married to the Tongan Australian rugby player Israel Folau. The two married in Kangaroo Valley, New South Wales on 15 November 2017, in a private outdoor ceremony. She subsequently changed her last name from Tuta'ia to Folau.
