= 2007 World Netball Championships =

Tournament details
- Host country: New Zealand
- Dates: 10–17 November 2007
- Teams: 16

Final positions
- Champions: Australia (9th title)
- Runners-up: New Zealand
- Third place: Jamaica

The 2007 World Netball Championships was the 12th edition of the INF Netball World Cup, a quadrennial premier event in international netball co-ordinated by the International Federation of Netball Associations (IFNA). Sixteen nations contested the title from 10 to the 17 November. It was held in the West Auckland, New Zealand. Forty-eight matches over 8 days were played in The Trusts Stadium, Waitakere. The event was broadcast to over half a dozen countries

Australia defended its eighth title to defeat the home side, New Zealand, 42–38.

== Withdrawal of hosting rights ==
After seeing off competing bids from Australia and South Africa, Fiji was awarded the hosting rights for the 2007 World Netball Championships in November 2003. Fiji was the second Pacific nation selected to host the competition. New Zealand debuted the distinction having hosted in 1975 and followed in 1999.

During eleven days from 10 July to 21 July 2007, 16 teams contested for the title. Hosting costs became an issue with a forecast of F$3 million. the International Netball Federation (INFA) noted in a press release that the economic gain is significant, as Jamaica's economy had benefited significantly from a commensurate influx of sports tourists.

In December 2006, following months of tension, Commander Voreqe (Frank) Bainimarama staged a military coup to unseat the government of Prime Minister Laisenia Qarase.

As a direct result of the coup and the political and economic uncertainty it created, on December 8, 2006 the IFNA withdrew Fiji's hosting rights for the 2007 edition. The popularity of netball was expected to have a significant impact in Fiji so withdrawal of hosting rights was a significant action.

IFNA announced a new host on December 23, 2006 that New Zealand, who last hosted the tournament in 1999 in Christchurch, would host the tournament during November 2007. It was undecided if Auckland or Christchurch would hold the tournament, as both cities have suitable facilities. But on 27 January it was decided that Auckland would be the host city for the 2007 competition, with all matches to be played at The Trusts Stadium, Waitakere from 10 to 17 November.

== Nations ==
Pool A	Pool B	Pool C	Pool D
New Zealand; Malawi; Wales; Botswana	Australia; Samoa; Trinidad and Tobago; Scotland	Jamaica; Cook Islands; Fiji; Singapore	England; South Africa; Barbados; Malaysia

== Format ==
The tournament comprised 48 games, held over an 8-day period. Every team was guaranteed to play 6 games, and every team would be awarded a rank from 1 to 16 as a result.

=== Pool Stage ===
Points are awarded as follows:
• 2 Points for a Win
• 1 Points for a Draw
• 0 Points for a Loss In the event of a tie, the result of the game between the tied teams would be decided who was ranked higher.
Tie situations would be resolved in three tie-breaker scenarios:
• The team with the superior Goal Average (Goals For/Goals Against) will be ranked highest.
• If the Goal Average is identical, the team with the better Goal Difference will be ranked highest.
• If the Goal Difference is identical, the team with the higher Goals For will be ranked highest.

All times are New Zealand Time (UCT +13 hours)

==== Pool A ====
Pos	Team	Pld	W	D	L	GF	GA	GD	Pts
1	New Zealand	3	3	0	0	247	70	+177	6
2	Malawi	3	2	0	1	125	169	-44	4
3	Wales	3	1	0	2	130	176	-46	2
4	Botswana	3	0	0	3	87	174	-87	0

- Highlighted teams advanced to the quarter-finals. Remaining teams will contest classification matches.

10 November; 20:10 (NZST)	New Zealand	85–26	Malawi	Trusts Stadium: Court 1

11 November; 14:10 (NZST)	Wales	54–35	Botswana	Trusts Stadium: Court 1

12 November; 14:10 (NZST)	Malawi	44–32	Botswana	Trusts Stadium: Court 1

12 November; 16:10 (NZST)	New Zealand	86–24	Wales	Trusts Stadium: Court 1

13 November; 12:10 (NZST)	Wales	52–55	Malawi	Trusts Stadium: Court 1

13 November; 18:10 (NZST)	New Zealand	76–20	Botswana	Trusts Stadium: Court 1

==== Pool B ====
Pos	Team	Pld	W	D	L	GF	GA	GD	Pts
1	Australia	3	3	0	0	253	80	+173	6
2	Samoa	3	2	0	1	138	169	-31	4
3	Trinidad and Tobago	3	1	0	2	129	169	-40	2
4	Scotland	3	0	0	3	98	200	-102	0

11 November; 14:10 (NZST)	Trinidad and Tobago	47–39	Scotland	Trusts Stadium: Court 2

11 November; 20:10 (NZST)	Australia	82–26	Samoa	Trusts Stadium: Court 1

12 November; 12:10 (NZST)	Samoa	60–39	Scotland	Trusts Stadium: Court 2

12 November; 18:10 (NZST)	Australia	78–34	Trinidad and Tobago	Trusts Stadium: Court 1

13 November; 14:10 (NZST)	Australia	93–20	Scotland	Trusts Stadium: Court 1

13 November; 16:10 (NZST)	Trinidad and Tobago	48–52	Samoa	Trusts Stadium: Court 1

==== Pool C ====
Date	Time	Court			Result
Sunday, November 11	16:10	2	Fiji	Singapore	61-32
Sunday, November 11	18:10	1	Jamaica	Cook Islands	71-29
Monday, November 12	12:10	1	Cook Islands	Singapore	45-43
Monday, November 12	20:10	1	Jamaica	Fiji	78-35
Tuesday, November 13	14:10	2	Cook Islands	Fiji	42-36
Tuesday, November 13	16:10	2	Jamaica	Singapore	91-35

Points Table

Team	Played	Won	Drawn	Lost	Goals For	Goals Against	Goal Difference	Points
Jamaica	3	3	0	0	240	99	+141	6
Cook Islands	3	2	0	1	116	150	-34	4
Fiji	3	1	0	2	132	152	-20	2
Singapore	3	0	0	3	110	197	-87	0

==== Pool D ====
Date	Time	Court			Result
Sunday, November 11	12:10	1	South Africa	Malaysia	67-28
Sunday, November 11	16:10	1	England	Barbados	87-34
Monday, November 12	14:10	2	South Africa	Barbados	56-36
Monday, November 12	16:10	2	England	Malaysia	99-16
Tuesday, November 13	12:10	2	Barbados	Malaysia	62-38
Tuesday, November 13	20:10	1	England	South Africa	62-32

Points Table

Team	Played	Won	Drawn	Lost	Goals For	Goals Against	Goal Difference	Points
England	3	3	0	0	248	82	+166	6
South Africa	3	2	0	1	155	126	+29	4
Barbados	3	1	0	2	132	181	-49	2
Malaysia	3	0	0	3	82	228	-146	0

=== Section Games ===
After the pool stages, the teams are divided into two sections. The top 2 qualifiers from each pool go into Section 1-8, and the bottom two go into Section 9-16.

In the sectional games, no draws are permitted, so Extra Time is played. Extra Time operates as follows:
• Initially, extra time of two, seven minute halves will be played.
• In the event of a tie remaining at the end of extra time, teams change ends without an interval and the game is restarted by the team entitled to the next centre pass.
• Play will then continue until one team has a two-goal advantage.

==== Section 9-16 ====
Quarter Finals

	Date	Time	Court			Result
QF1	Wednesday, November 14	14:10	1	Barbados	Botswana	43-44
QF2	Wednesday, November 14	16:10	1	Trinidad and Tobago	Singapore	42-32
QF3	Wednesday, November 14	18:10	1	Fiji	Scotland	58-37
QF4	Wednesday, November 14	20:10	1	Wales	Malaysia	69-32

Semi-Finals

	Date	Time	Court			Result
SF1	Thursday, November 15	12:10	1	Botswana	Trinidad and Tobago	39-38
SF2	Thursday, November 15	12:10	2	Barbados	Singapore	44-43
SF3	Thursday, November 15	14:10	2	Scotland	Malaysia	64-40
SF4	Thursday, November 15	16:10	2	Fiji	Wales	68-36

Position Playoffs

	Date	Time	Court			Result
11th/12th	Friday, November 16	12:10	1	Trinidad and Tobago	Wales	48-45
15th/16th	Friday, November 16	12:10	2	Singapore	Malaysia	59-44
9th/10th	Friday, November 16	14:10	1	Botswana	Fiji	20-65
13th/14th	Friday, November 16	14:10	2	Barbados	Scotland	51-45

==== Section 1-8 ====
Quarter Finals

	Date	Time	Court			Result
QF1	Thursday, November 15	14:10	1	England	Malawi	81-37
QF2	Thursday, November 15	16:10	1	Australia	Cook Islands	90-22
QF3	Thursday, November 15	18:10	1	Jamaica	Samoa	73-42
QF4	Thursday, November 15	20:10	1	New Zealand	South Africa	82-23

Semi-Finals

	Date	Time	Court			Result
SF1	Friday, November 16	16:10	1	Samoa	South Africa	50-54
SF2	Friday, November 16	16:10	2	Cook Islands	Malawi	47-61
SF3	Friday, November 16	18:10	1	England	Australia	33-51
SF4	Friday, November 16	20:10	1	New Zealand	Jamaica	59-49

Position Playoffs

	Date	Time	Court			Result
7th/8th	Saturday, November 17, 2007	14:10	1	Samoa	Cook Islands	55-56
5th/6th	Saturday, November 17, 2007	16:10	1	Malawi	South Africa	52-49
3rd/4th	Saturday, November 17, 2007	18:10	1	England	Jamaica	52-53
1st/2nd	Saturday, November 17, 2007	20:10	1	New Zealand	Australia	38-42

== Final Placings ==
1. Australia
2. New Zealand
3. Jamaica
4. England
5. Malawi
6. South Africa
7. Cook Islands
8. Samoa
9. Fiji
10. Botswana
11. Trinidad and Tobago
12. Wales
13. Barbados
14. Scotland
15. Singapore
16. Malaysia

== Medallists ==
Gold	Silver	Bronze
Australia; Coach: Norma Plummer	New Zealand; Coach: Ruth Aitken	Jamaica; Coach: Connie Francis
Liz Ellis (c); Sharelle McMahon (vc); Bianca Chatfield; Catherine Cox; Mo'onia Gerrard; Selina Gilsenan; Natalie Medhurst; Lauren Nourse; Susan Pratley; Julie Prendergast; Laura von Bertouch; Natalie von Bertouch	Adine Wilson (c); Julie Seymour (vc); Maree Bowden; Leana de Bruin; Paula Griffin; Joline Henry; Laura Langman; Sheryl Scanlan; Jodi Te Huna; Maria Tutaia; Irene van Dyk; Casey Williams	Elaine Davis (c); Nicole Aiken; Romelda Aiken; Nadine Bryan; Althea Byfield; Kasey Evering; Simone Forbes; Nichala Gibson; Sasher-Gaye Henry; Christina Solmon; Paula Thompson; Sharon Wiles
