= Netball at the 2002 Commonwealth Games =

Commonwealth Games netball tournament hosted by England

Tournament details
- Host country: England
- City: Manchester
- Venue: MEN Arena
- Dates: 26 July–4 August 2002
- Teams: 10

Final positions
- Champions: Australia (2nd title)
- Runners-up: New Zealand
- Third place: Jamaica

Tournament statistics
- Matches played: 31
- Top scorer(s): Irene van Dyk (New Zealand)

Netball at the 2002 Commonwealth Games was the second netball tournament at the Commonwealth Games. Ten teams, including the hosts England, featured in a series of matches played in July and August 2002 at Manchester's MEN Arena. With a team captained by Kathryn Harby-Williams, featuring Catherine Cox, Sharelle McMahon, Nicole Richardson and Peta Squire and coached by Jill McIntosh, Australia won the tournament after defeating New Zealand 57–55 in the gold medal match. The match was tied at 46–46 at the end of normal time, and 14 minutes of extra-time saw the sides still level at 55–55. In sudden death extra-time, Sharelle McMahon scored the vital point to give Australia the necessary two-goal gap to win the gold medal. Jamaica finished the tournament in third place after defeating England 55–53 in the bronze medal match.

== Head coaches and captains ==
| Team | Head coach | Captain |
|---|---|---|
| Australia | Jill McIntosh | Kathryn Harby-Williams |
| Barbados | | |
| Canada | | Sharon Butler; Dulcina Wind |
| England | Lyn Gunson | Olivia Murphy |
| Fiji | Margaret Corbett | Unaisi Rokoura |
| Jamaica | Maureen Hall | Oberon Pitterson |
| New Zealand | Ruth Aitken | Julie Seymour |
| South Africa | Louise de Plessis | Bronwyn Bock-Jonathan; Mable Van Der Vyver |
| Sri Lanka | | |
| Wales | Raewyn Henry | Joanna Griffiths |

== Pool A ==
=== Round 1 ===
| 26 July 2002 | Wales | 48–47 | Sri Lanka |
| 15:00 | Mair Jones 31; Jamilla Harris 13 | Report | Sashika Samarasinghe 28; Gishanthi Jayakody 19 |

| 26 July 2002 | England | 87–26 | Canada |
| 18:30 | Alex Astle 30; Joanne Steed 22; Abby Teare 18; Jess Garland 17 | Report | Dulcina Wind 14; Maralyn Hope 12 |

=== Round 2 ===
| 27 July 2002 | New Zealand | 101–17 | Canada |
| 13:00 | Daneka Wipiiti 39; Donna Loffhagen 34; Irene van Dyk 20/21 (95%); Belinda Colling 8 | Report | Maralyn Hope 10; Patricia Carlson 7 |

| 27 July 2002 | England | 75–34 | Sri Lanka |
| 18:30 | Alex Astle 31/41 (76%); Jess Garland 25; Joanne Steed 19 | Report | Sashika Samarasinghe 13; Prasadi Nalika 12; Gishanthi Jayakody 8 Anoma Sriyakanthi 1 |

=== Round 3 ===
| 28 July 2002 | New Zealand | 116–26 | Sri Lanka |
| 13:00 | Irene van Dyk 58/61 (95%); Donna Loffhagen 23; Belinda Colling 21; Daneka Wipiiti 14 | Report | Prasadi Nalika 14; Sashika Samarasinghe 6 Gishanthi Jayakody 6 |

| 28 July 2002 | England | 81–18 | Wales |
| 20:30 | Alex Astle 42/66 (64%); Abby Teare 39/48 (81%) | Report | Sian Edwards 8 Mair Jones 6 ?? 2 |

=== Round 4 ===
| 29 July 2002 | Wales | 49–42 | Canada |
| 15:00 | Mair Jones 37/47 (79%); Sian Edwards 12 | Report | Dulcina Wind 23; Maralyn Hope 19 |

| 29 July 2002 | England | 35–67 | New Zealand |
| 20:30 | Abby Teare 22; Alex Astle 13 | Report | Irene van Dyk 44/48 (92%); Donna Loffhagen 15; Belinda Colling 8 |

=== Round 5 ===
| 30 July 2002 | Canada | 52–49 | Sri Lanka |
| 15:00 | Dulcina Wind 30; Maralyn Hope 22 | Report | Sashika Samarasinghe 26 ? Gishanthi Jayakody 12; Prasadi Nalika 10 |

| 30 July 2002 | New Zealand | 81–23 | Wales |
| 18:30 | Donna Loffhagen 35/38 (92%); Belinda Colling 23; Daneka Wipiiti 23 | Report | Mair Jones 9 Sian Edwards 7 Jamilla Harris 7 |

=== Table ===
| Pos | Team | P | W | D | L | GF | GA | GD | Pts |
|---|---|---|---|---|---|---|---|---|---|
| 1 | New Zealand | 4 | 4 | 0 | 0 | 365 | 101 | +264 | 8 |
| 2 | England | 4 | 3 | 0 | 1 | 278 | 145 | +133 | 6 |
| 3 | Wales | 4 | 2 | 0 | 2 | 138 | 251 | -113 | 4 |
| 4 | Canada | 4 | 1 | 0 | 3 | 137 | 286 | -149 | 2 |
| 5 | Sri Lanka | 4 | 0 | 0 | 4 | 156 | 291 | -135 | 0 |

Qualified for Major semi-finals
Qualified for Minor Semi-finals
Qualified for 7th/10th classification

== Pool B ==
=== Round 1 ===
| 26 July 2002 | South Africa | 52–42 | Fiji |
| 13:00 | Sindiswe Gumede 43/52 (83%); Shani Welthagen 5 Adele Jonker 2 Alicia Senekal 1 Wanda Geldenhuis 1 | Report | Matelita Shaw 22; Paulini Tora 20 |

| 26 July 2002 | Jamaica | 65–20 | Barbados |
| 20:30 | Simone Forbes 37; Elaine Davis 28 | Report | Cheryl Squires 37; Olivia Walcott 28 |

=== Round 2 ===
| 27 July 2002 | Jamaica | 66–55 | South Africa |
| 15:00 | Elaine Davis 46/54 (85%); Simone Forbes 20/21 (95%) | Report | Sindiswe Gumede 49/58 (84%); Adele Jonker 3 Shani Welthagen 2 Martha Machoga 1 |

| 27 July 2002 | Australia | 75–28 | Barbados |
| 20:30 | Sharelle McMahon 24; Catherine Cox 22; Eloise Southby 18; Jacqui Delaney 6 | Report | Cheryl Squires 16; Olivia Walcott 11 |

=== Round 3 ===
| 28 July 2002 | South Africa | 56–37 | Barbados |
| 15:00 | Sindiswe Gumede 49; Adele Jonker 6 Shani Welthagen 1 | Report | Cheryl Squires 21; Olivia Walcott 16 |

| 28 July 2002 | Australia | 83–32 | Fiji |
| 18:30 | Catherine Cox 29/36 (81%); Sharelle McMahon 26; Eloise Southby 18; Jacqui Delaney 10 | Report | Matelita Shaw 14; Taraima Rara 10; Paulini Tora 8 |

=== Round 4 ===
| 29 July 2002 | Australia | 74–38 | South Africa |
| 13:00 | Catherine Cox 39/50 (78%); Sharelle McMahon 18; Eloise Southby 17 | Report | Sindiswe Gumede 27/29 (93%); Adele Jonker 4 Martha Machoga 7 |

| 29 July 2002 | Jamaica | 84–33 | Fiji |
| 18:30 | Elaine Davis 58/64 (91%); Simone Forbes 18/20 (90%); Tiffannie Wolfe 8 | Report | Matelita Shaw 14/23 (61%); Paulini Tora 12; Taraima Rara 7 |

=== Round 5 ===
| 30 July 2002 | Barbados | 46–44 | Fiji |
| 13:00 | Cheryl Squires 30; Olivia Walcott 16 | Report | Matelita Shaw 19; Taraima Rara 19; Paulini Tora 6 |

| 30 July 2002 | Australia | 60–33 | Jamaica |
| 20:30 | Sharelle McMahon 23; Eloise Southby 20; Catherine Cox 17 | Report | Elaine Davis 22; Simone Forbes 11 |

=== Table ===
| Pos | Team | P | W | D | L | GF | GA | GD | Pts |
|---|---|---|---|---|---|---|---|---|---|
| 1 | Australia | 4 | 4 | 0 | 0 | 292 | 131 | +161 | 8 |
| 2 | Jamaica | 4 | 3 | 0 | 1 | 248 | 168 | +80 | 6 |
| 3 | South Africa | 4 | 2 | 0 | 2 | 201 | 219 | -18 | 4 |
| 4 | Barbados | 4 | 1 | 0 | 3 | 131 | 240 | -109 | 2 |
| 5 | Fiji | 4 | 0 | 0 | 4 | 151 | 265 | -114 | 0 |

Qualified for Major semi-finals
Qualified for Minor Semi-finals
Qualified for 7th/10th classification

== Classification ==
=== 7th/10th classification ===
| 31 July 2002 | Sri Lanka | 41–40 | Barbados |
| 13:00 | Sashika Samarasinghe 22; Gishanthi Jayakody 19 | | Olivia Walcott 13; Cheryl Squires 11; Denise Alleyne 11 ? Harris 5 |

| 31 July 2002 | Fiji | 74–39 | Canada |
| 15:00 | Taraima Rara 30; Matelita Shaw 23; Paulini Tora 16; Maria Bereso 6 | Report | Maralyn Hope 22; Dulcina Wind 17 |

=== 9th/10th playoff ===
| 2 August 2002 | Barbados | 64–30 | Canada |
| 11:00 | Cheryl Squires 39; Olivia Walcott 21; Laurel Browne 3 ? Harris 1 | Report | Dulcina Wind 18; Patricia Carlson 7 Maralyn Hope 5 |

=== 7th/8th playoff ===
| 2 August 2002 | Fiji | 80–42 | Sri Lanka |
| 13:00 | Paulini Tora 25; Taraima Rara 22; Matelita Shaw 22; Maria Bereso 11 | Report | Sashika Samarasinghe 24/31 (77%); Gishanthi Jayakody 15; Prasadi Nalika 3 |

== Medal competition ==
=== Minor semi-finals ===
| 31 July 2002 | Jamaica | 72–32 | Wales |
| | Elaine Davis 42; Simone Forbes 19 | Report | Mair Jones 24; Sian Edwards 5 Jamilla Harris 3 |

| 31 July 2002 | England | 55–40 | South Africa |
| 21:00 | Abby Teare 29/39 (74%); Joanne Steed 16; Alex Astle 10 | Report | Sindiswe Gumede 28; Martha Machoga 12 |

=== 5th/6th playoff ===
| 2 August 2002 | South Africa | 71–27 | Wales |
| 15:00 | Sindiswe Gumede 56; Adele Jonker 10; Martha Machoga 5 | Report | Jamilla Harris 17; Sian Edwards 8 Mair Jones 2 |

=== Major semi-finals ===
| 2 August 2002 | New Zealand | 69–51 | Jamaica |
| 18:30 | Irene van Dyk 41/48 (85%); Donna Loffhagen 28 | | Elaine Davis 28; Simone Forbes 23 |

| 2 August 2002 | Australia | 49–38 | England |
| 20:30 | Eloise Southby 28; Sharelle McMahon 15; Jacqui Delaney 6 | | Joanne Steed 19; Abby Teare 17; Alex Astle 2 |

=== Bronze medal match ===
| 4 August 2002 | Jamaica | 55–53 | England |
| 11:00 | Elaine Davis 42; Simone Forbes 13 | | Alex Astle 32/38 (84%); Abby Teare 21 | Attendance: 10,000 |

=== Gold Medal Match ===
| 4 August 2002 | Australia | 57–55 | New Zealand |
| 13:00 | Sharelle McMahon 33; Catherine Cox 15; Eloise Southby 9 | | Irene van Dyk 35; Donna Loffhagen 20 | Attendance: 10,000 |

== Medallists ==
| Gold | Silver | Bronze |
|---|---|---|
| Australia; Coach: Jill McIntosh | New Zealand; Coach: Ruth Aitken | Jamaica; Coach: Maureen Hall |
| Alexandra Hodge; Alison Broadbent; Catherine Cox; Liz Ellis; Eloise Southby; Jacqui Delaney; Janine Ilitch; Kathryn Harby-Williams (c); Nicole Richardson; Peta Squire; Rebecca Sanders; Sharelle McMahon | Anna Rowberry; Anna Veronese; Belinda Colling; Daneka Wipiiti; Donna Loffhagen; Irene van Dyk; Jenny-May Coffin; Julie Seymour (c); Lesley Nicol; Linda Vagana; Sheryl Clarke; Vilimaina Davu | Elaine Davis; Georgia Gordon; Kaydia Kentish; Nadine Ffrench; Nadine Bryan; Nichala Gibson; Oberon Pitterson (c); Sharmalee Watkins; Sharon Wiles; Simone Forbes; Tasha Morgan; Tiffannie Wolfe |

== Final Placings ==
| Rank | Team |
|---|---|
| 1st place, gold medalist(s) | Australia |
| 2nd place, silver medalist(s) | New Zealand |
| 3rd place, bronze medalist(s) | Jamaica |
| 4 | England |
| 5 | South Africa |
| 6 | Wales |
| 7 | Fiji |
| 8 | Sri Lanka |
| 9 | Barbados |
| 10 | Canada |
