= Linda Magombo =

Malawian netball player and coach

Personal information

Netball career
Years	National team	Caps
- Malawi

Linda Magombo-Munthali is a Malawian netball player who has played for the national team including at the 2006 and 2010 Commonwealth Games in New Delhi

== Career ==
=== As a netball player ===
She was chosen to join the national team while she was studying Agricultural Economics. She worked in rural Malawi developing projects. In time she gained a Master’s degree in Development and Resource Economics.

In 2000 she joined the Tigresses Netball Team in Blantyre. In March 2006 she was in Australia with the national netball team at the 2006 Commonwealth Games in Melbourne and in the netball world championship in Auckland, New Zealand in 2007.

In 2009 the first 2009 World Netball Series took place in Manchester. Six countries sent teams and Magombo was in the Malawian netball team. Magombo was pleased when she was the player of the match when they played South Africa.

In June 2013 she returned from her base in South Africa to play for the Tigresses and she caught the attention of the Malawi national netball team. She played well for the tigresses even though she had not played netball for a while. She was unnecessarily wary of her reception by the supporters.

She was chosen to play in the 2013 Africa Netball Championship but she decided to make a stand. She demanded that the netball association should pay her the money that they owed her for the Commonwealth Games three years before in New Delhi. Magombo later reported that was never chosen again for the national team. Moreover she suggested that other team members were so worried about keeping their place in the team that they allowed themselves to be treated badly. She spoke out in support of another national player Mwai Kumwenda who was complaining about the oppressive atmosphere.

In June 2024 she became a vice-Presidential candidate in the Malawi Netball Association's elections. However at the extra-ordinary general meeting called to elect a new committee she was defeated by Lumbani Ntonyo. The new President was Vitumbiko Gubuduza.

== Personal life ==
Magombo has three children.
