= 2009 World Netball Series =

International netball tournament hosted by England

Tournament details
- Host country: England
- City: Manchester
- Venue: MEN Arena
- Dates: 9–11 October 2009
- Teams: 6
- TV partner(s): Network Ten (Australia); TV One (New Zealand); Sky Sports (UK/Ireland); Television Jamaica

Final positions
- Champions: New Zealand (1st title)
- Runners-up: Jamaica
- Third place: Australia

Tournament statistics
- Matches played: 20

The 2009 World Netball Series was the inaugural World Netball Series. England hosted Australia, Jamaica, Malawi, New Zealand and Samoa in a series, played in October 2009, at Manchester's MEN Arena. The series was organised and hosted by the International Federation of Netball Associations, England Netball, Manchester City Council, the Northwest Regional Development Agency and UK Sport. It was sponsored by The Co-operative Group.

With a team coached by Ruth Aitken and captained by Casey Williams, New Zealand won the inaugural series after defeating Jamaica 32–27 in the final. Australia finished the series in third place after beating England 23–18 in a play off. Malawi's Mwai Kumwenda was named tournament MVP.

== Squads ==
Participating teams and rosters
Australia	England	Jamaica	Malawi	New Zealand	Samoa
Kate Beveridge; Rebecca Bulley; Bianca Chatfield; Catherine Cox; Johannah Curran; Susan Fuhrmann; Kimberlee Green; Renae Hallinan; Natalie Medhurst; Lauren Nourse; Susan Pratley; Natalie von Bertouch (c)	Karen Atkinson; Sara Bayman; Eboni Beckford-Chambers; Jade Clarke; Rachel Dunn; Pamela Cookey; Stacey Francis; Tamsin Greenway; Serena Guthrie; Jo Harten; Geva Mentor; Sonia Mkoloma	Nicole Aiken; Romelda Aiken; Nadine Bryan; Simone Forbes; Nichala Gibson; Crystal Gordon; Nardia Hanson; Sasher-Gaye Henry; Malysha Kelly; Sasha-Gay Lynch; Tracy-Ann Robinson; Paula Thompson	Merenia Gedion; Peace Kaluwa; Tina Kamzati; Mwai Kumwenda; Linda Magombo; Sylvia Malenga; Emma Mdzagada; Beatrice Mpinganjira; Caroline Mtukule; Grace Mwafulirwa; Esther Nkhoma; Mary Waya	Liana Leota; Temepara George; Katrina Grant; Paula Griffin; Joline Henry; Laura Langman; Wendy Frew; Anna Thompson; Maria Tutaia; Irene van Dyk; Larrissa Willcox; Casey Williams (c)	Shirin Chang; Lee Edwards; Malu Faasavalu; Monica Fuimaono; Samantha Lewis; Lesley Simone; Frances Solia; Geraldine Solia; Sose Tavae; Italia Tipelu; Ida Vaai; Brooke Williams
Coach: Norma Plummer	Coach:Sue Hawkins	Coach: Connie Francis	Coach: Edith Kaliati	Coach: Ruth Aitken	Coach: Linda Vagana
Assistant coach: Susan Kenny	Assistant coaches:	Assistant coach:	Assistant coach:	Assistant coach:	Assistant coach:

== Round robin stage ==
=== Day 1 ===
9 October 2009	England	36–16	Samoa
14:40 (GMT)

9 October 2009	Australia	31–26	Jamaica
15:25 (GMT)

9 October 2009	New Zealand	27–22	Malawi
16:10 (GMT)		Report

9 October 2009	England	24–21	New Zealand
18:35 (GMT)

9 October 2009	Jamaica	30–22	Samoa
19:20 (GMT)

9 October 2009	Australia	31–19	Malawi
20:05 (GMT)

9 October 2009	New Zealand	37–28	Jamaica
20:50 (GMT)

=== Day 2 ===
10 October 2009	Australia	25–22	New Zealand
10:05 (GMT)

10 October 2009	Malawi	33–16	Samoa
10:50 (GMT)

10 October 2009	England	27–24	Jamaica
11:35 (GMT)		Report

10 October 2009	Australia	37–18	Samoa
12:20 (GMT)

10 October 2009	England	33–22	Malawi
14:35 (GMT)

10 October 2009	New Zealand	34–14	Samoa
15:20 (GMT)

10 October 2009	Jamaica	30–25	Malawi
16:05 (GMT)

10 October 2009	England	25–19	Australia
16:50 (GMT)

=== Ladder ===
Pos	Team	P	W	D	L	GF	GA	GD	Pts
1	England	5	5	0	0	145	102	+43	10
2	Australia	5	4	0	1	143	110	+33	8
3	New Zealand	5	3	0	2	141	113	+28	6
4	Jamaica	5	2	0	3	138	142	-4	4
5	Malawi	5	1	0	4	121	137	-16	2
6	Samoa	5	0	0	5	86	166	-80	0

Qualified for Semi-final 1
Qualified for Semi-final 2
Qualified for 5th/6th place match

== Playoffs ==
=== Semi-final 1 ===
11 October 2009	England	22–33	Jamaica
13:05 (GMT)

=== Semi-final 2 ===
11 October 2009	New Zealand	27–17	Australia
13:50 (GMT)

=== 5th v 6th Playoff ===
11 October 2009	Malawi	28–20	Samoa
14:35 (GMT)

=== 3rd v 4th Playoff ===
11 October 2009	England	18–23	Australia
15:20 (GMT)

=== Final ===
11 October 2009	New Zealand	32–27	Jamaica
16:05 (GMT)

== Final Placings ==
Rank	Team
1st place, gold medalist(s)	New Zealand
2nd place, silver medalist(s)	Jamaica
3rd place, bronze medalist(s)	Australia
4	England
5	Malawi
6	Samoa
