= Kasey Evering =

Jamaican international netball player

Personal information
- Full name: Kasey Ann Evering
- Born: 14 February 1983 (age 43)
- Occupation: Coach
- Height: 1.85 m (6 ft 1 in)
- Children: Kaheim Aiken
- Relatives: Olda Allwood (Mother), Kurt Evering (Brother), Nadine Evering (Sister)

Netball career
- Playing positions: GD, GK
Years	Club team	Apps
2001–present	Clarendon Gators	
2011	Tivoli Gardens	
- Canterbury Tactix
Years	National team	Caps
2000–present	Jamaica	
Medal record
Representing Jamaica
Netball World Championships
Bronze medal – third place	2003 Kingston	Netball
Bronze medal – third place	2007 Auckland	Netball
Commonwealth Games
Bronze medal – third place	2014 Glasgow	Netball
- Updated on 21 October 2010

Kasey Evering (born 14 February 1983) is a Jamaican international netball player. Evering is primarily a defender at international level, although she also plays as a shooter in domestic competition.

Evering made her debut with the Jamaica national netball team, the Sunshine Girls, in 2000 against England. That year she also competed at the World Youth Netball Championships in Wales. During her international career, Evering has won bronze medals with the Sunshine Girls at two Netball World Championships (2003 and 2007), and has competed at two Commonwealth Games (in 2006 and 2010), where Jamaica placed fourth both times.

Evering left the national team after the 2007 World Championships, following an injury and a dispute with the Jamaican Netball Association. She continued to play domestic netball with Tivoli Gardens, whom she had played with since 2001. Evering suffered a potentially career-ending knee injury during a league match in 2009. After a long recovery involving two surgeries, Evering returned the following year to help guide Tivoli to a Berger Super League title.

Evering returned to the national team that year in time for the 2010 Commonwealth Games in Delhi, and played in the January 2011 test series against Australia. In 2011, Evering made her debut in the Australasian ANZ Championship, signing with New Zealand franchise the Canterbury Tactix. She injured the anterior cruciate ligament in her left knee during a regular season match, ending her season with the Tactix and ruling her out of the 2011 Netball World Championships in Singapore. She once again rejoined the team in 2014 and was selected for the 2014 Commonwealth Games where the team won bronze. As of 2014, she has over 70 caps for her country.
