= Abby Sargent =

Australian netball player

Personal information
- Full name: Abby Marie Sargent (Née: Teare)
- Born: 25 May 1977 (age 49) Melbourne, Australia
- Height: 1.81 m (5 ft 11 in)
- Spouse: Graeme John Sargent
- Children: Tom Eric Sargent

Netball career
Years	Club team	Apps
1999–2000	Melbourne Kestrels	
2007	Melbourne Phoenix	
2008	Melbourne Vixens	
Years	National team	Caps
2000–2006	England	
Medal record
Representing England
Commonwealth Games
Bronze medal – third place	2006 Melbourne	Netball
- Updated on 2009-03-29

Abby Marie Sargent (née Teare; born 25 May 1977 in Melbourne, Australia) is a retired Australian netball player. Sargent was also a member of the England national team that played in the 2002 and 2006 Commonwealth Games. She also played for the Melbourne Kestrels (1999–2000) and the Melbourne Phoenix (2007) in the Commonwealth Bank Trophy. With the start of the ANZ Championship, Sargent played for the Melbourne Vixens in the 2008 season, after which she announced her retirement from netball. She held an Australian Institute of Sport scholarship from 1997 to 1998.
