= Jamaica national netball team =

Jamaica
- Nickname(s): Sunshine Girls
- Association: Netball Jamaica
- Confederation: Americas Netball
- Head coach: Sasher-Gaye Henry
- Captain: Jhaniele Fowler
- Most caps: Nadine Bryan (159)
- World ranking: 4th
Team colours	Alternate

Netball World Cup
- Appearances: 16 (Debuted in 1963)
- 2023 placing: 3rd
- Best result: 3rd (1991, 2003, 2007, 2023)

Commonwealth Games
- Appearances: 8 (Debuted in 1998)
- 2026 placing: 2nd
- Best result: 2nd (2022, 2026)

The Jamaica national netball team, commonly known as the Sunshine Girls, represent Netball Jamaica in international netball tournaments such as the Netball World Cup, Netball at the Commonwealth Games, the Taini Jamison Trophy and the Fast5 Netball World Series. They have also represented Jamaica at the World Games. At the 2022 and 2026 Commonwealth Games, Jamaica were silver medallists. They were bronze medallists in 2002, 2014 and 2018. They were also bronze medallists at the 1991, 2003, 2007 and 2023 Netball World Cups. Jamaica also won the 2018 Taini Jamison Trophy Series. As of 1 March 2026, Jamaica are ranked number four in the World Netball Rankings.

== History ==
=== Early tests ===
The Jamaica Netball Association was formed in 1959. It subsequently became affiliated to the West Indies Netball Board and were invited to send a team to the West Indies Netball Championship in Montserrat in August 1959. Jamaica made their Test debut at this tournament.

=== World Netball Rankings ===
Between 2008 and 2018, Jamaica were regularly ranked number four in the World Netball Rankings. However, in July 2019, they were ranked number two for the first time. During the early 2020s they have regularly challenged England for the number three position.

== Tournament history ==
=== Major tournaments ===
==== Netball World Cup ====
Jamaica have competed at every Netball World Cup since the inaugural 1963 tournament. They have been bronze medalists on four occasions – 1991, 2003, 2007 and 2023. Jamaica have also hosted the 1971 and 2003 World Netball Championships.

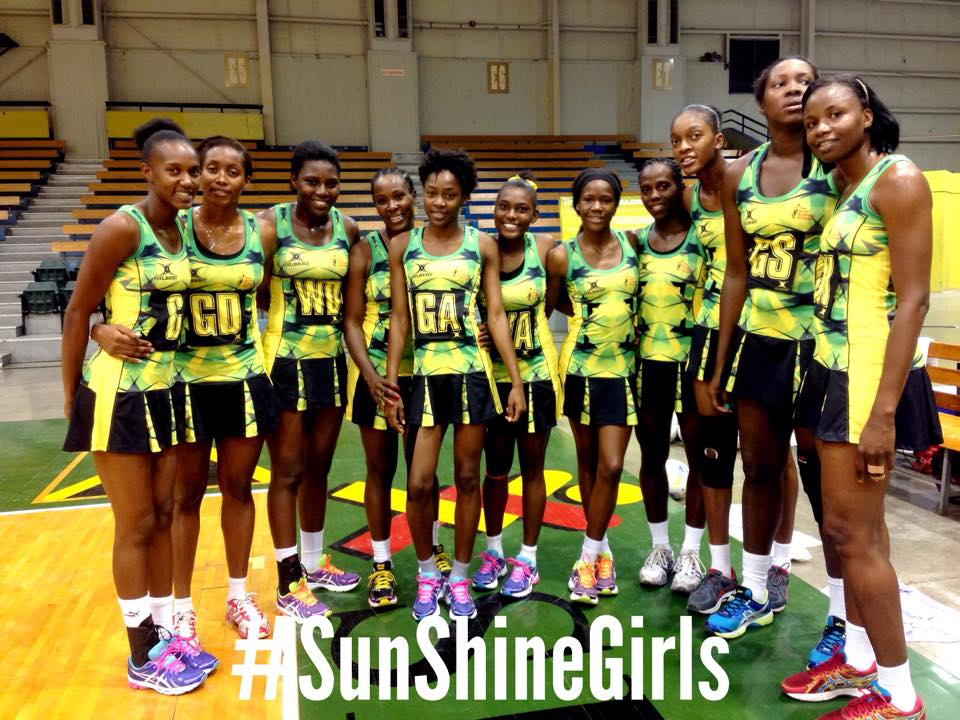
2015 Jamaica team.

Tournaments	Place
1963 World Netball Tournament	5th
1967 World Netball Tournament	6th
1971 World Netball Tournament	4th
1975 World Netball Tournament	5th
1979 World Netball Tournament	5th
1983 World Netball Tournament	5th
1987 World Netball Tournament	5th
1991 World Netball Championships	3rd place, bronze medalist(s)
1995 World Netball Championships	5th
1999 World Netball Championships	4th
2003 World Netball Championships	3rd place, bronze medalist(s)
2007 World Netball Championships	3rd place, bronze medalist(s)
2011 World Netball Championships	4th
2015 Netball World Cup	4th
2019 Netball World Cup	5th
2023 Netball World Cup	3rd place, bronze medalist(s)
2027 Netball World Cup	

==== World Games ====
Tournaments	Place
1985 World Games	3rd place, bronze medalist(s)
1993 World Games	3rd place, bronze medalist(s)

==== Commonwealth Games ====
Jamaica have competed at every netball tournament at the Commonwealth Games. They were bronze medallists in 2002, 2014 and 2018. At the 2022 Commonwealth Games, with a team coached by Connie Francis and captained by Jhaniele Fowler, Jamaica finished as silver medallists. Jamaica defeated Australia 57–55 during the pool stages and topped the pool. In the semi-finals they defeated New Zealand 67–51 and, as a result, qualified for their first major final. However, in the final, they lost 55–51 to Australia.

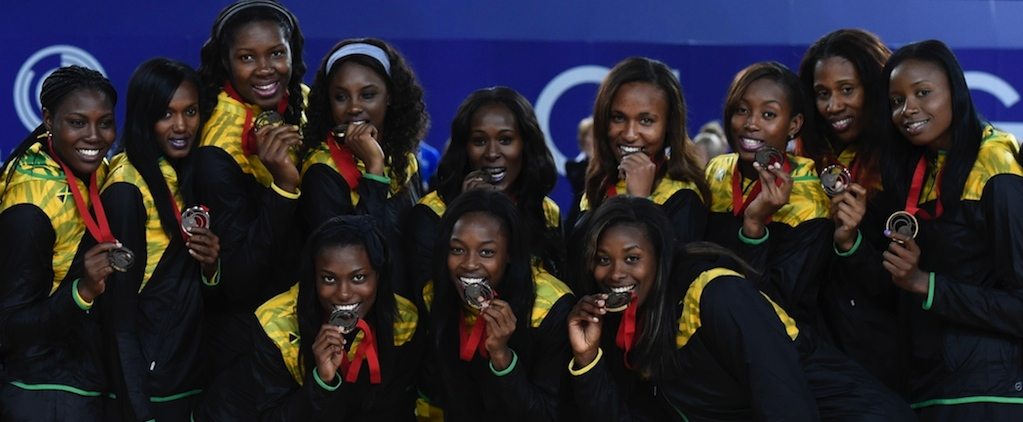
2014 Commonwealth Games bronze medallists.

Tournaments	Place
1998 Commonwealth Games	5th
2002 Commonwealth Games	3rd place, bronze medalist(s)
2006 Commonwealth Games	4th
2010 Commonwealth Games	4th
2014 Commonwealth Games	3rd place, bronze medalist(s)
2018 Commonwealth Games	3rd place, bronze medalist(s)
2022 Commonwealth Games	2nd place, silver medalist(s)
2026 Commonwealth Games	2nd place, silver medalist(s)

==== Taini Jamison Trophy ====
Since 2008, Netball New Zealand has hosted the Taini Jamison Trophy series. The series features New Zealand playing against visiting teams. In 2010, Jamaica made their debut in the series and they have been regular participants ever since. In 2018, Jamaica won the series. During a full four team tournament, they twice defeated New Zealand, once in the preliminary rounds and again in the final. However, Netball New Zealand subsequently refused to allow Jamaica to take the actual trophy home, stating that "for insurance purposes... we can't really have it go offshore". In 2022 complications with passports and visas saw the Jamaica team's arrival in New Zealand delayed. This resulted in the original test series been cancelled. It also saw Jamaica playing with a severely under strength team. Following an investigation, World Netball would later fine Netball Jamaica GBP £5,000 (NZD $9,800) for failing to fulfill the original fixtures planned for the series.

Tournaments	Place
2010 Taini Jamison Trophy Series	2nd
2016 Taini Jamison Trophy Series	2nd
2018 Taini Jamison Trophy Series	1st
2022 Taini Jamison Trophy Series	2nd

==== Netball Nations Cup ====
Tournaments	Place
2020 Netball Nations Cup	2nd

==== Fast5 Netball World Series ====
Since 2009, Jamaica have played in the Fast5 Netball World Series.

Tournaments	Place
2009 World Netball Series	2nd
2010 World Netball Series	3rd
2011 World Netball Series	4th
2012 Fast5 Netball World Series	4th
2013 Fast5 Netball World Series	3rd
2014 Fast5 Netball World Series	4th
2016 Fast5 Netball World Series	5th
2017 Fast5 Netball World Series	2nd
2018 Fast5 Netball World Series	2nd
2022 Fast5 Netball World Series	6th
2023 Fast5 Netball World Series	5th
2024 Fast5 Netball World Series	6th

=== Americas tournaments ===
==== West Indies, Caribbean, AFNA Championships ====
Jamaica made their Test debut at the 1959 West Indies Netball Championship. After 1984, Jamaica began to participate more regularly and, from 1989 onwards, they replaced Trinidad and Tobago as the dominant team, winning nearly every tournament they entered.

Tournaments	Place
1959 West Indies Netball Championship	
1984 Caribbean Netball Championships	4th
1988 Caribbean Netball Championships	
1989 Caribbean Netball Championships	1st
1990 Caribbean Netball Championships	1st
1991 Caribbean Netball Championships	1st
1994 AFNA Championships	1st
1996 AFNA Championships	1st
1997 AFNA Championships	1st
2000 AFNA Championships	1st
2001 AFNA Championships	1st
2004 AFNA Championships	1st
2008 AFNA Championships	1st
2012 AFNA Championships	1st

==== Netball World Cup Qualifiers ====
Tournaments	Place
2023 Netball World Cup Regional Qualifier – Americas	1st

==== Central American and Caribbean Games ====
Tournaments	Place
2023 Central American and Caribbean Games	1st
2026 Central American and Caribbean Games	2nd

== Notable players ==
=== Current Squad ===
Jamaica national netball team roster
Players
Coaches

Name	Pos	DOB	Height	Club	Nat	Caps
Romelda Aiken-George (c)	GS	9 November 1988 (age 38)	1.96 m (6 ft 5 in)	West Coast Fever	(Australia)
Abigale Sutherland	C		–
Shanice Beckford (vc)	GA, WA	16 April 1995 (age 31)	1.70 m (5 ft 7 in)		(Australia)
Azara Wilmot	GS, GA		–	London Mavericks NXT Gen	(England)
Rhea Dixon	GA, WA		1.80 m (5 ft 11 in)	Nottingham Forest Netball	(England)
Nicole Dixon-Rochester	C, WA	3 February 1995 (age 31)	1.65 m (5 ft 5 in)		(Jamaica)
Brie Grierson	WA	8 April 1997 (age 29)	1.75 m (5 ft 9 in)	Nottingham Forest Netball	(England)
Crystal Plummer	WD		–		(Jamaica)
Jodi-Ann Ward	WD, GD	1 September 1994 (age 32)	1.78 m (5 ft 10 in)	Giants Netball	(Australia)
Latanya Wilson	GD, WD	November 10, 2000 (age 26)	1.88 m (6 ft 2 in)	Adelaide Thunderbirds	(Australia)
Shamera Sterling	GK, GD	21 October 1995 (age 31)	1.85 m (6 ft 1 in)	Adelaide Thunderbirds	(Australia)
Kadie-Ann Dehaney	GK, GD	4 September 1996 (age 30)	1.92 m (6 ft 4 in)	West Coast Fever	(Australia)

Head coach

- Sasher Gaye Henry Wright

Assistant coach

- Rob Wright

Notes

- (c) – Captain
- (cc) – Co-captain
- (vc) – Vice-captain
- – Injury / maternity leave
- (TRP) – Temporary Replacement Player

=== Captains ===
Captains	Years
Barbara Buckley-Jones	1959, 1963
Avis Collins	1967
Vilma McDonald	1971
Sonia Nissen	1975
Brenda Khouri	1979, 1983
Janet Johnson	1987, 1991
Jill Patterson	1988
Marva Lindsay	1993
Connie Francis	1995, 1999
Oberon Pitterson	2002, 2003
Elaine Davis	2006–2007
Simone Forbes	2007–2011
Nadine Bryan	2009–2013
Romelda Aiken	2013–2014
Malysha Kelly	2013–2016
Nicole Aiken-Pinnock	2014–2015
Althea Byfield	2016
Jhaniele Fowler	2017–
Shimona Nelson	2022
Adean Thomas	2023

=== Most-capped internationals ===
Player	Appearances	Years
Nadine Bryan	159	1996–2014
Oberon Pitterson	120+	1988–2006
Connie Francis	120+	1985–2003
Georgia Gordon	110	1994–2010
Simone Forbes	102	2000–2011
Jhaniele Fowler	99+	2010–
Elaine Davis	91	1995–2007
Romelda Aiken	86	2005–
Nicole Aiken-Pinnock	82	2005–2018
Kasey Evering	81	2002–2014
Nichala Gibson	79	2000–2009
Sasher-Gaye Henry	75	1996–2015

== Head coaches ==
Coach	Years
Leila Robinson	1963
Jo Wigman	1967–1979
Barbara Robinson Sinclair	1983–1987
Maureen Hall	1991–2006
Connie Francis	2007–2011
Oberon Pitterson	2011–2014
Minneth Reynolds	2014–2016
Jermaine Allison-McCracken	2017
Marvette Anderson	2017–2019^{1}
Sasher-Gaye Henry	2017–2018^{1}
Connie Francis	2019–2023
Nicole Aiken-Pinnock	2023
Sasher-Gaye Henry	2024–

Notes

- ^1 Between 2017 and 2018, Marvette Anderson and Sasher-Gaye Henry served as co-head coach.

== Honours ==
- Commonwealth Games
  - Runners Up: 2022, 2026
- West Indies, Caribbean, AFNA Championships
  - Winners: 1989, 1990, 1991, 1994, 1996, 1997, 2000, 2001, 2004, 2008, 2012
- Netball World Cup Qualifiers
  - Winners: 2023
- Central American and Caribbean Games
  - Winners: 2023
  - Runners Up: 2026
- Taini Jamison Trophy
  - Winners: 2018
  - Runners Up: 2010, 2016, 2022
- Netball Nations Cup
  - Runners Up: 2020
- Fast5 Netball World Series
  - Runners up: 2009, 2017, 2018
