= Casey Kopua =

New Zealand netball player

Casey Kopua ONZM
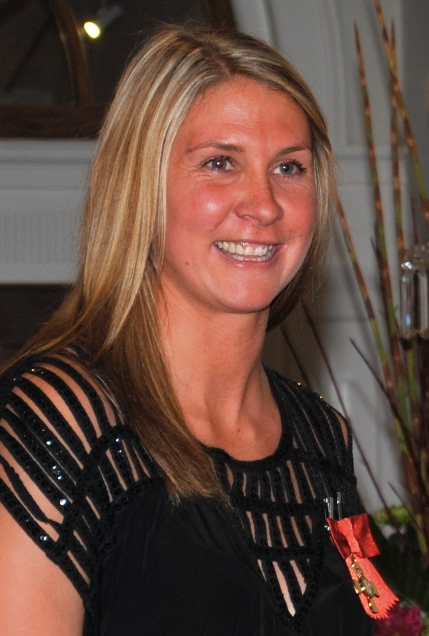
- Kopua in 2011

Personal information
- Full name: Casey May Kopua (Née: Williams)
- Born: 19 June 1985 (age 41) Hamilton, New Zealand
- Height: 1.88 m (6 ft 2 in)
- Spouse: Terry Kopua (m. 2012)
- Children: 3
- School: Matamata College
- University: University of Waikato

Netball career
- Playing positions: GK, GD
Years	Club team	Apps
2003–2015, 2018–2019	Waikato Bay of Plenty Magic	
2025	Giants Netball	
- (Correct as of 1 June 2025)
Years	National team	Caps
2004–2015, 2019	New Zealand	112
- (Correct as of 30 July 2019)
Medal record
Representing New Zealand
World Netball Championships
Silver medal – second place	2007 Auckland
Silver medal – second place	2011 Singapore
Silver medal – second place	2015 Sydney
Gold medal – first place	2019 Liverpool
Commonwealth Games
Gold medal – first place	2006 Melbourne	Netball
Gold medal – first place	2010 Delhi	Netball
Silver medal – second place	2014 Glasgow	Netball
World Netball Series
Gold medal – first place	2009 Manchester	Fastnet
Gold medal – first place	2013 Auckland	Fast5

Casey May Kopua ONZM (née Williams; born 19 June 1985) is a retired New Zealand international netball player and former captain of the New Zealand national netball team, the Silver Ferns, and the Waikato Bay of Plenty Magic.

Kopua became a member of the New Zealand national netball team (the Silver Ferns) in 2004, making her on-court debut in 2005 against Barbados. She also played in the New Zealand U21 netball team that won gold at the 2005 World Youth Netball Championships in Florida. During her career she has won gold medals at the 2006 and 2010 Commonwealth Games and the 2009 World Netball Series, and silver medals at the 2007 and 2011 World Netball Championships. In 2008, she co-captained the team with Laura Langman, stepping into the role of acting captain later that year following an injury to Julie Seymour. In July 2009, Kopua became the 23rd captain of the Silver Ferns, taking over from Seymour who retired from the game.

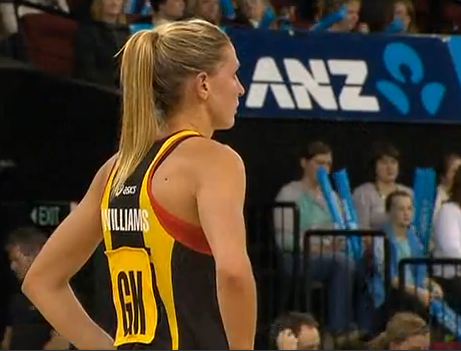
Williams, with Waikato Bay of Plenty Magic, in the 2010 ANZ Championship grand final

In domestic netball, Kopua played her entire career with the Waikato Bay of Plenty Magic, starting in 2003. During the 2008 ANZ Championship season, she was named the Holden Captiva player of the championship, winning a new car.

In the 2011 Queen's Birthday Honours, Kopua was appointed an Officer of the New Zealand Order of Merit, alongside former Silver Ferns coach Ruth Aitken, for services to netball in New Zealand.

On 11 October 2014, Kopua became the most capped New Zealand netball captain in history, playing her 63rd test as captain of the team in the 3rd test of the 2014 Constellation Cup against Australia. In the fourth quarter of that match, Kopua suffered a suspected dislocated patella (knee injury). Scans later revealed that Kopua also ruptured her patella tendon. Three days later Kopua underwent surgery to repair her patella tendon.

In 2017, still rehabing from her surgery, Kopua announced her retirement from the Silver Ferns, stating she would return to the Waikato Bay of Plenty Magic in 2018, but would not be available for international selection. Kopua was coaxed back to the national team by Noeline Taurua for the 2019 Netball World Cup. New Zealand would go on to win the World Cup, with Kopua being named the grand final's player of the match. She retired from netball after the World Cup.

In 2024, Kopua was an inaugural inductee to the Netball New Zealand Hall of Fame.

In 2025, Kopua made her return to netball in Round 8 of the Australian Suncorp Super Netball league as a replacement player for GIANTS Netball after defender Jodi-Ann Ward ruptured her ACL. In Round 9, Kopua helped the GIANTS achieve just their second win of the season.

In 2026, Kopua played one game for the Waikato Bay of Plenty Magic as injury cover, but was injured during the game.

== Personal life ==
In December 2012, Kopua married Hamilton lawyer Terry Kopua. Her maid was a heavily pregnant Joline Henry, who has given birth two weeks after the wedding On 21 May 2016, the couple announced the birth of their daughter. Following the 2019 Netball World Cup, Kopua revealed that she was unknowingly pregnant during the tournament. The couple had a second child, a boy, in 2020, and another son on Christmas Eve 2021.

When she started filming for Game On in 2025, she was on the waiting list for double knee replacements.
