= Laura Langman =

New Zealand netball player

Laura Langman ONZM
Personal information
- Born: 16 April 1986 (age 40) Hamilton, New Zealand
- Height: 1.73 m (5 ft 8 in)
- Spouse: Adrian Pooley
- School: Hillcrest High School
- University: University of Waikato

Netball career
- Playing positions: WD, C, WA
Years	Club team	Apps
2003–2012	Waikato Bay of Plenty Magic	
2013–2015	Northern Mystics	
2016	New South Wales Swifts	
2017, 2019–20	Sunshine Coast Lightning	48
2026	Johor Jewels	
Years	National team	Caps
2002–2005	New Zealand U21	
2003–2020	New Zealand	163
Medal record
Representing New Zealand
World Netball Championships
Silver medal – second place	2007 Auckland	Tournament
Silver medal – second place	2011 Singapore	Tournament
Silver medal – second place	2015 Sydney	Tournament
Gold medal – first place	2019 Liverpool	Tournament
Commonwealth Games
Gold medal – first place	2006 Melbourne	Tournament
Gold medal – first place	2010 Delhi	Tournament
Silver medal – second place	2014 Glasgow	Tournament
World Netball Series
Gold medal – first place	2009 Manchester (FastNet)	Tournament
Gold medal – first place	2012 Auckland (Fast5)	Tournament
- Updated on 13 June 2011

Laura Robyn Langman ONZM (born 16 April 1986) is a retired New Zealand international netball player, who last played domestic netball for the Sunshine Coast Lightning in the Australian Super Netball league. Primarily a midcourt player, Langman is a former captain and vice-captain of the New Zealand national netball team (nicknamed the Silver Ferns). She is the most capped player in the history of the Silver Ferns, having overtaken Irene van Dyk's record of 145 test matches in October 2018.

== Early career ==
While still a student at Hillcrest High School in Hamilton, Langman was selected for the New Zealand U21 team. In 2003, she made her elite netball debut with the Waikato Bay of Plenty Magic in the National Bank Cup, and later that year was selected for the Silver Ferns.

== Silver Ferns ==
Langman made her international test debut in 2005 against England. That year she captained the New Zealand U21 side to win gold at the World Youth Netball Championships in Fort Lauderdale, Florida. In the National Bank Cup, Langman won two premierships with the Magic in 2005 and 2006. She was also selected for the Silver Ferns team that won a gold medal at the 2006 Commonwealth Games in Melbourne.

The following year she made the Silver Ferns team to contest the 2007 Netball World Championships in Auckland, but almost had to withdraw with a foot injury. Langman recovered in time for the Championships, in which the Silver Ferns came in second behind Australia. She captained the Ferns several times in 2012, due to Casey Williams being injured, she also captained the 2012 New Zealand Fast5 team, where she led them to a gold medal against England.

Langman's decision to play for the Sunshine Coast Lightning in 2017 meant she was, amidst some controversy, not eligible to represent the national team. After much conjecture, Langman was granted an exemption by Netball New Zealand to play for the Silver Ferns in 2018/19. Ahead of the September 2018 Quad Series, Langman was elected by her fellow players and coaches as captain of the Silver Ferns. She captained the Ferns to the 2019 Netball World Cup championship, in what would be one of her last matches in the black dress before retiring from netball the following year.

== Domestic career ==
With the start of the ANZ Championship, Langman remained with the Waikato Bay of Plenty Magic, who finished runners-up in 2008. She was named vice-captain of the Silver Ferns that year, and was elevated to acting co-captain following an injury to Julie Seymour. Although normally a wing defender, Langman became increasingly shifted into different areas of the midcourt to cover gaps left by injured players or personnel changes. In 2009, she earned her 50th test cap against England at the age of 23, and won a gold medal with the Silver Ferns at the 2009 World Netball Series in Manchester. The following year she won another gold medal with the Silver Ferns at the 2010 Commonwealth Games in Delhi. She was also named captain of the Waikato Bay of Plenty Magic for the 2010 ANZ Championship season, and continued in the role in 2011.The Magic took out the ANZ championship in 2012 beating the Melbourne Vixens. Laura played a very important part in the Magic as captain and playing the centre position with flair. On 19 August 2015, the New South Wales Swifts announced their acquisition of Langman for the 2016 ANZ Championship season.

In 2017, Langman moved to the Sunshine Coast Lightning, a newly created team in the Australian Super Netball league, where she was instrumental in winning the club's first premiership. Langman left the club at the end of the year and announced a break from the sport the following year. She returned to the Lightning for the 2019 season after being granted an exemption by Netball New Zealand to play in a foreign league and represent her country. She was named captain of the team. Langman retired from all levels of netball after the Lightning's loss in the 2020 preliminary final loss to the West Coast Fever.

In total Langman played more than 225 national league games across four clubs, the Waikato Bay of Plenty Magic, Northern Mystics, New South Wales Swifts and Sunshine Coast Lightning. The latter club's head coach, Kylee Byrne, stated "the legacy that [Langman] will leave at our club and the sport in general is monumental, one of netball’s greats has retired".

== Honours and awards ==
In the 2020 New Year Honours, Langman was appointed an Officer of the New Zealand Order of Merit, for services to netball. In 2024, she was an inaugural inductee to the Netball New Zealand Hall of Fame.

== Personal life ==
Langman is a trained Accountant by profession. She met husband Adrian Pooley at Wintec in 2009 when he took Langman for a fitness test.
