= Nicole Aiken-Pinnock =

Jamaican netball player (born 1985)

Nicole Pinnock
Personal information
- Full name: Nicole Alicia Aiken-Pinnock (Née: Aiken)
- Born: 11 December 1985 (age 40)
- Occupation: Lecturer
- Height: 6 ft 2 in (1.88 m)
- Relative: Romelda Aiken (sister)
- School: Clarendon College
- University: G.C. Foster College; Lamar University

Netball career
- Playing positions: GK, GD
| Years | Club team | Apps |
| 2017-present | Sirens (netball) | |
| 2004-2016 | Clarendon Gators | |
| Years | National team | Caps |
| 2006–present | Jamaica | |
Medal record
Representing Jamaica
World Netball Championships
| Bronze medal – third place | 2007 Auckland | Netball |
Commonwealth Games
| Bronze medal – third place | 2014 Glasgow | Netball |
World Netball Series
| Silver medal – second place | 2009 Manchester | Fastnet |
| Bronze medal – third place | 2010 Liverpool | Fastnet |
- Updated on 5 August 2011

Nicole Alicia Aiken-Pinnock (née Aiken; born 11 December 1985) is a Jamaican netball player. Pinnock started playing international representative netball as early as 2004, although she made her senior debut in the Jamaica national team, the Sunshine Girls, at the 2006 Commonwealth Games in Melbourne. In 2007, Pinnock received a four-year scholarship to play basketball with Lamar University in Texas, where she played center for the Cardinals. However, in 2008 it was reported that Pinnock had given up the scholarship and returned to her first college, G.C. Foster.

Pinnock currently plays netball for the Sunshine Girls at international level, and for Sirens (netball) in the Netball Superleague. She captained the team to bronze at the 2014 Commonwealth Games.
