= Irene van Dyk =

New Zealand and South Africa netball international

Irene van Dyk MNZM
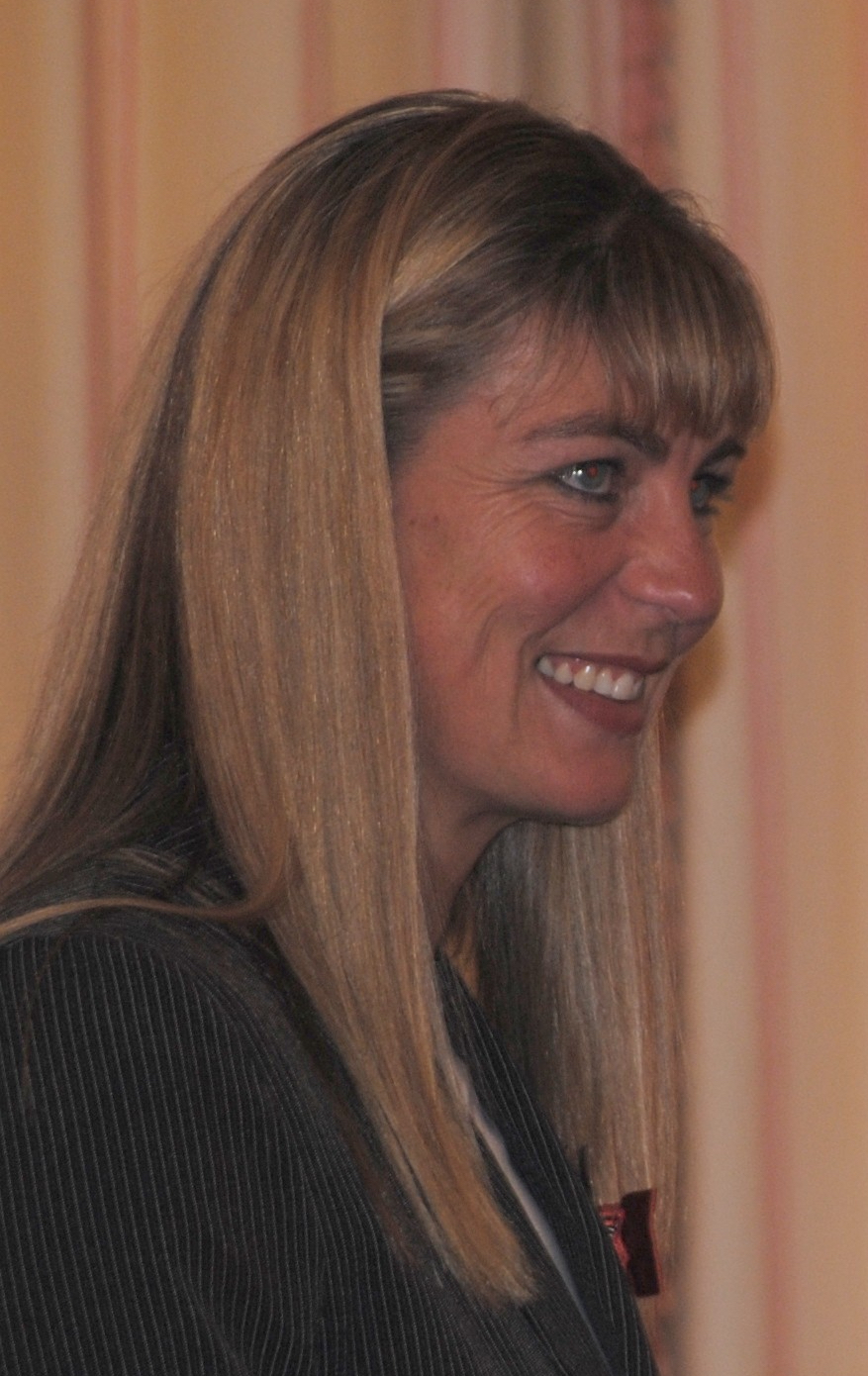
- 28 April 2010: Irene van Dyk at her investiture as a Member of the New Zealand Order of Merit.

Personal information
- Full name: Irene van Dyk (Née: Viljoen)
- Born: 21 June 1972 (age 54) Vereeniging, Gauteng, South Africa
- Height: 1.90 m (6 ft 3 in)
- University: Rand Afrikaans University

Netball career
- Playing positions: GS, GA
Years	Club team	Apps
2000-2002	Capital Shakers	
2003-2013	Waikato Bay of Plenty Magic	
2014-2015	Central Pulse	
Years	National team	Caps
1994-1999	South Africa	72
2000-2014	New Zealand	145
Medal record
Representing South Africa
World Netball Championships
Silver medal – second place	1995 Birmingham	Team
Representing New Zealand
World Netball Championships
Gold medal – first place	2003 Kingston	Team
Silver medal – second place	2007 Auckland	Team
Silver medal – second place	2011 Singapore	Team
Commonwealth Games
Gold medal – first place	2006 Melbourne	Team
Gold medal – first place	2010 Delhi	Team
Silver medal – second place	2002 Manchester	Team
Fast5 Netball World Series
Gold medal – first place	2009 Manchester	Team
Gold medal – first place	2012 Auckland	Team
Silver medal – second place	2011 Liverpool	Team

Irene van Dyk (née Viljoen; born 21 June 1972) is a former netball international who represented both New Zealand and South Africa. Between 2000 and 2014 she made 145 senior appearances for New Zealand. She was a member of the New Zealand teams that won the 2003 World Netball Championships and the 2006 and 2010 Commonwealth Games titles. Between 1994 and 1999 she made 72 senior appearances for South Africa. She was member of the South Africa team that were silver medallists at the 1995 World Netball Championships. She captained South Africa at the 1999 World Netball Championships. During her international netball career, she scored 5917 goals from 6572 attempts at 90%. Van Dyk remains the world's most capped netball international. She was the 2003 New Zealand Sportswoman of the Year. Between 2003 and 2013, van Dyk played for Waikato Bay of Plenty Magic. In 2005 and 2006, she was a member of the Magic team that won two successive National Bank Cup titles and in 2012, she was a member of the Magic team that won the ANZ Championship. In 2009, van Dyk was appointed a Member of the New Zealand Order of Merit, for services to netball. In 2022, she was included on a list of the 25 best players to feature in netball leagues in New Zealand since 1998. In 2024 she was inducted into the Netball New Zealand Hall of Fame.

== Early life and family ==
Irene van Dyk is the daughter of Herman and Irene Viljoen. She was born in Vereeniging, Gauteng, South Africa. Her mother played korfball for South Africa and her father was an umpire. She is the youngest of four siblings and grew up on a farm in Meyerton, Gauteng. In her youth she showed potential as a track and field athlete. Between 1988 and 1990 she represented her province in the 400m and 100m hurdles at the South African Athletics Championships. Her father died in 1992 during a routine appendix operation. Her mother died in July 2012 after a long battle with cancer. In 1994, she married Christie van Dyk. Christie and Irene met at university. Together the couple have one child, a daughter named Bianca (born c. 1998). In 2000, after moving to New Zealand, van Dyk began working as a schoolteacher at Fergusson Intermediate.

== Playing career ==
=== Early career ===
In South Africa, van Dyk played for Rand Afrikaans University and Gauteng.

=== Capital Shakers ===
While playing for South Africa at the 1999 World Netball Championships, van Dyk was invited to play for six months with Capital Shakers. She also received an offer to play for Queensland Firebirds. Between 2000 and 2002, van Dyk played for Shakers in the Coca-Cola Cup/National Bank Cup league. She was a prominent member of the Shakers team that were semi-finalists three years in succession. They finished third in 2000 and fourth in 2001 and 2002. In 2000, van Dyk scored 367 goals from 396 attempts at 93% as Shakers reached their first semi-final. However, they subsequently lost 50–35 to Canterbury Flames. On 22 April 2001, an outstanding goal scoring performance from van Dyk saw Shakers defeated Southern Sting 51–48 in a Round 4 match. It ended a winning run of 18 matches over two years for Sting. During the 2001 season, van Dyk had a 91% shooting success rate as she played a major role in leading Shakers to their second semi-final. However, they lost 60–49 to Sting.

=== Waikato Bay of Plenty Magic ===
Between 2003 and 2013, van Dyk played for Waikato Bay of Plenty Magic, initially in the National Bank Cup league and later in the ANZ Championship. She was a prominent member of a successful Magic team coached by Noeline Taurua. In 2005 and 2006, she was a member of the Magic team that won two successive National Bank Cup titles. During the 2007 and 2009 seasons, she co-captained Magic with Joline Henry. In 2008, she was a member of the Magic team that finished as ANZ Championship minor premiers and overall runners-up. In 2010 she helped Magic finish as runners up. In 2011, during a Round 8 match against Queensland Firebirds, van Dyk made her 100th senior appearance for Magic. She was the first Magic player to reach this tally. In 2012, she was a member of the Magic team that won the ANZ Championship. During the season she turned 40. Just hours before the preliminary final against Northern Mystics, van Dyk received the news that her mother had died. In the grand final Magic defeated Melbourne Vixens 41–38. Van Dyk scored 25 of her 26 attempts at 96%.

=== Central Pulse ===
In 2014 and 2015, van Dyk played for Central Pulse in the ANZ Championship. On 26 April 2014, van Dyk made her 100th ANZ Championship appearance in a Round 9 match against Melbourne Vixens.

=== International ===
==== South Africa ====
Between 1994 and 1999, van Dyk made 72 senior appearances for South Africa. She was a prominent member of the South Africa team that were silver medallists at the 1995 World Netball Championships. During the tournament they defeated both England and New Zealand before losing in the final to Australia. In 1996, van Dyk was awarded the State President's Merit Award by President Nelson Mandela for her contributions. She also represented South Africa at the 1998 Commonwealth Games and captained South Africa at the 1999 World Netball Championships. She scored 1,121 goals for South Africa from 1,284 attempts at 87%.

==== New Zealand ====
After playing for Capital Shakers in the Coca-Cola Cup/National Bank Cup league, van Dyk switched her international allegiances from South Africa to New Zealand. She had decided to make her move to New Zealand permanent and Netball South Africa told her they wouldn't pick her for South Africa. Between 2000 and 2014, van Dyk made 145 senior appearances for New Zealand. She represented New Zealand at the 2003, 2007 and 2011 World Netball Championships and at the 2002, 2006 and 2010 Commonwealth Games. She scored 4796 goals for New Zealand from 5288 attempts at 91%. On 20 June 2000, van Dyk made her senior debut for New Zealand during an away series against Australia. Ahead of the 2002 Commonwealth Games, Netball South Africa tried to block van Dyk from playing for New Zealand. However, they were overruled by the South African Commonwealth Games Association who granted her permission. She subsequently helped New Zealand finish as silver medallists at the Games. She was a prominent member of the New Zealand team that were gold medallists at the 2003 World Netball Championships. In the final against Australia, she scored 41 goals from 43 attempts at 95%, as New Zealand won 49–47. At the 2003 Halberg Awards, van Dyk was named Sportswoman of the Year.

On 29 October 2005, van Dyk made her 129th senior test appearance against Australia. This saw her overtake England's Kendra Slawinski as the world's most capped netball international. Incidentally, she scored 41 from 43 at 95% as New Zealand defeated Australia 61–36. At the time, the 26-goal margin became New Zealand's biggest win over Australia. She was member of the New Zealand team that were gold medallists at the 2006 Commonwealth Games. In the final against Australia, she scored 44 goals from 49 as New Zealand won 60–55. On 23 September 2009, van Dyk made her 100th senior test appearance for New Zealand in a 52–36 win over Australia. She marked the occasion by scoring 33 goals from 36 attempts at 92%.

Van Dyk was chosen to lead the New Zealand team and carry the flag of New Zealand at the 2010 Commonwealth Games opening ceremony. On 5 October 2010, in a pool stage match against the Cook Islands, van Dyk made her 111th senior test appearance for New Zealand in a 87–24 win. This saw her overtake Lesley Rumball as New Zealand's most capped netball international. She went onto to help New Zealand win the 2010 Commonwealth Games title, scoring 25 from 29 at 86% in the final as they beat Australia 66–64.

During the 2011 Taini Jamison Trophy Series, van Dyk made her 200th senior test appearance in a match against England. She captained New Zealand at the 2011 World Netball Series. Van Dyk was also a member of the New Zealand team that won the 2012 Constellation Cup. In June 2014, van Dyk announced her retirement from international netball. She was selected to play for New Zealand at the 2014 Fast5 Netball World Series. However shortly before the tournament began, she had to withdraw from the squad because of injury. Van Dyk remains the world's most capped netball international. In April 2022, she was one of 25 New Zealand internationals included on a list of the best players to feature in netball leagues in New Zealand since 1998.

Tournaments	Place	Team
1995 World Netball Championships	2nd place, silver medalist(s)	South Africa
1998 Commonwealth Games	4th	South Africa
1999 World Netball Championships	5th	South Africa
2002 Commonwealth Games	2nd place, silver medalist(s)	New Zealand
2003 World Netball Championships	1st place, gold medalist(s)	New Zealand
2006 Commonwealth Games	1st place, gold medalist(s)	New Zealand
2007 World Netball Championships	2nd place, silver medalist(s)	New Zealand
2008 Taini Jamison Trophy Series	1st place, gold medalist(s)	New Zealand
2009 Taini Jamison Trophy Series	2nd place, silver medalist(s)	New Zealand
2009 World Netball Series	1st place, gold medalist(s)	New Zealand
2010 Constellation Cup	2nd place, silver medalist(s)	New Zealand
2010 Taini Jamison Trophy Series	1st place, gold medalist(s)	New Zealand
2010 Commonwealth Games	1st place, gold medalist(s)	New Zealand
2011 World Netball Championships	2nd place, silver medalist(s)	New Zealand
2011 Taini Jamison Trophy Series	1st place, gold medalist(s)	New Zealand
2011 Constellation Cup	2nd place, silver medalist(s)	New Zealand
2011 World Netball Series	2nd place, silver medalist(s)	New Zealand
2012 Netball Quad Series	2nd place, silver medalist(s)	New Zealand
2012 Constellation Cup	1st place, gold medalist(s)	New Zealand
2012 Fast5 Netball World Series	1st place, gold medalist(s)	New Zealand
2013 Constellation Cup	2nd place, silver medalist(s)	New Zealand
2013 Taini Jamison Trophy Series	1st place, gold medalist(s)	New Zealand

== MNZM ==
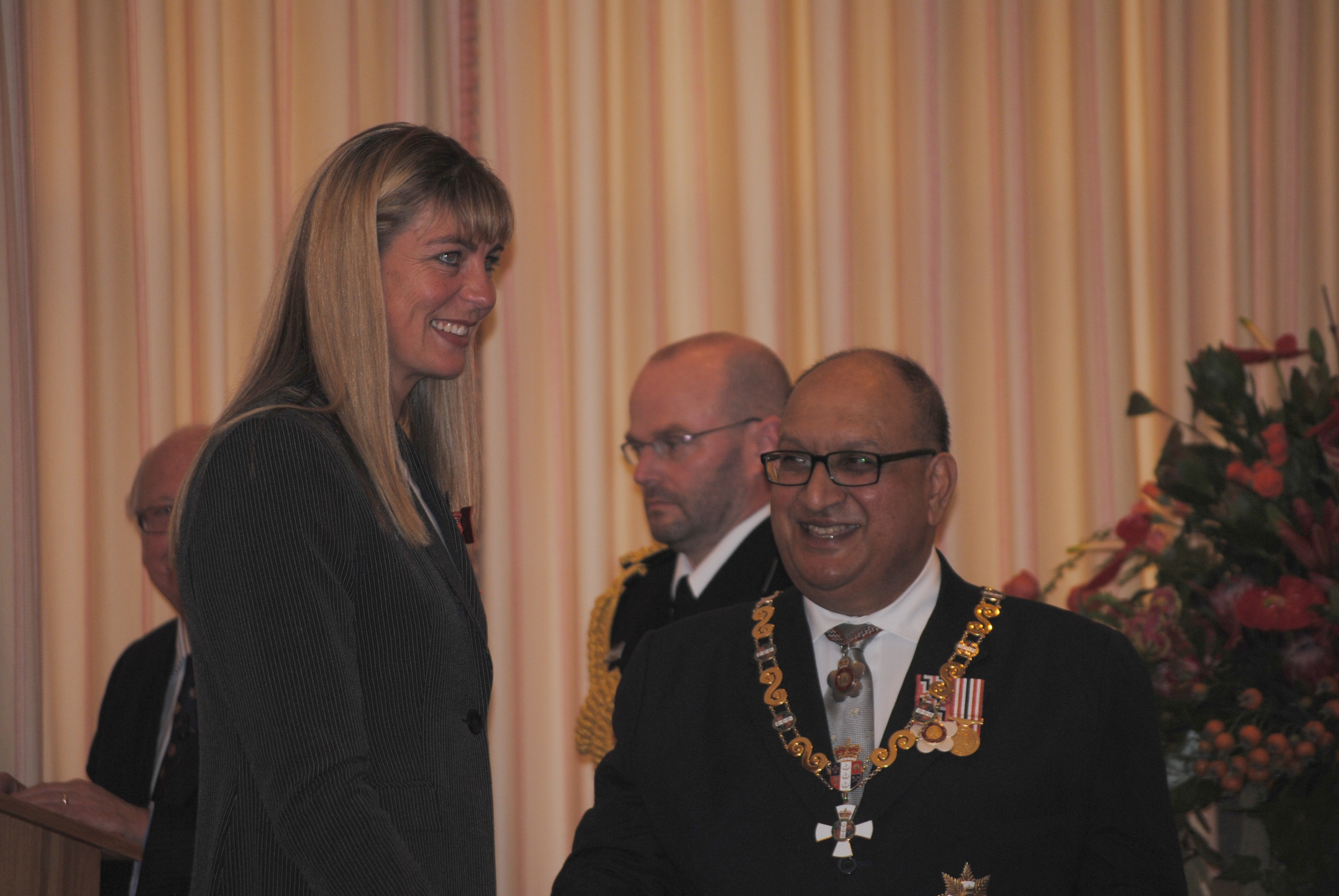
28 April 2010: Irene van Dyk at her investiture as a Member of the New Zealand Order of Merit by the Governor-General of New Zealand, Sir Anand Satyanand.

In the 2009 New Year Honours, van Dyk was appointed a Member of the New Zealand Order of Merit, for services to netball. Together with Margaret Foster and Belinda Charteris, she was one of several New Zealand netball people to receive an honour.

== Coaching career ==
Ahead of the 2015 Netball World Cup, van Dyk trained with Scotland. Van Dyk and the Scotland head coach, Gail Parata, where former teammates at Capital Shakers. In 2017, van Dyk served as team manager with Wellington Blaze women's cricket team. At the time her husband, Christie, was the team coach. In 2019, van Dyk served as a specialist coach with Central Pulse. In 2022, van Dyk began working for Netball New Zealand.

== Honours ==
New Zealand

- World Netball Championships
  - Winners: 2003
  - Runners up: 2007, 2011
- Commonwealth Games
  - Winners: 2006, 2010
  - Runners Up: 2002
- Taini Jamison Trophy
  - Winners: 2008, 2010, 2011, 2013
  - Runners Up: 2009
- Constellation Cup
  - Winners: 2012
  - Runners Up: 2010, 2011, 2013
- Fast5 Netball World Series
  - Winners: 2009, 2012
  - Runners up: 2011
- Netball Quad Series
  - Runners Up: 2012

South Africa

- World Netball Championships
  - Runners Up: 1995

Waikato Bay of Plenty Magic

- National Bank Cup
  - Winners: 2005, 2006
- ANZ Championship
  - Winners: 2012
  - Runners Up: 2008, 2010
  - Minor premiers: 2008

Individual Awards

Year	Award
1996	State President's Merit Award
2003	New Zealand Sportswoman of the Year
2009	Member of the New Zealand Order of Merit
2024	Netball New Zealand Hall of Fame
