= Simone Forbes =

Jamaican sportswoman (born 1981)

Personal information
- Full name: Simone Nagina Forbes
- Nationality: Jamaican
- Born: 20 June 1981 (age 45)
- Height: 1.73 m (5 ft 8 in)

Sport
- Country: Jamaica
- Sport: Netball, volleyball, basketball, football, softball
- Club: Waulgrovians Sports Club (netball)
- Team: Jamaica national netball team (captain)
Medal record
Representing Jamaica
Netball
Netball World Championships
| Bronze medal – third place | 2003 Kingston | Netball |
| Bronze medal – third place | 2007 Auckland | Netball |
Commonwealth Games
| Bronze medal – third place | 2002 Manchester | Netball |
World Netball Series
| Silver medal – second place | 2009 Manchester | Fastnet |
| Bronze medal – third place | 2010 Liverpool | Fastnet |

Simone Nagina Forbes (born 20 June 1981) is a Jamaican sportswoman, having represented Jamaica in no less than five sports, including netball, volleyball, basketball, football and softball.

Forbes played netball with Jamaica U21 in 1998, before making her debut with the Jamaica national netball team the following year. She continued with the national team, winning bronze medals at two Netball World Championships (2003 and 2007) and at the 2002 Commonwealth Games; she also won a silver medal at the inaugural 2009 World Netball Series, followed by another bronze in 2010 World Netball Series. Despite taking a short break away from the sport following the World Series, Forbes remained captain of the Sunshine Girls, and was selected as flag bearer for Jamaica at the 2010 Commonwealth Games in Delhi. As of 2010 Forbes is playing domestic netball for Waulgrovians.

In volleyball, she earned a sports scholarship to Mercy College, New York in 2004. In 2005 Forbes made her debut for the Jamaica women's national volleyball team, and graduated from Mercy College the following year.

In 2011, Forbes tested positive for the banned substance Clomiphene – frequently used by athletes taking steroids, but also commonly used in fertility treatments – during an out-of-competition drug test. She was subsequently banned for three months by the Jamaica Anti-Doping Commission from playing netball; the ban was to end after the 2011 Netball World Championships in Singapore.

== Awards ==
- Prime Minister's National Youth Award for Excellence in the Field of Sports - 2005
- International Student Athlete of the Year - 2003
- GC Foster College Sportswoman of the Year - 2002
- Carreras Sports Foundation Special Award for Netball - 2002
