= 2009 Waikato Bay of Plenty Magic season =

WBoP Magic season

Waikato Bay of Plenty Magic
- 2009 season
- Head coach: Noeline Taurua
- Co-captains: Joline Henry; Irene van Dyk
- Main venue: Mystery Creek Events Centre; Energy Events Centre; Queen Elizabeth Youth Centre

Season results
- Wins–losses: 11–4
- Regular season: 2nd
- Finals placing: 3rd
- Team colours

Waikato Bay of Plenty Magic seasons
- ← 2008 2010 →

The 2009 Waikato Bay of Plenty Magic season saw Waikato Bay of Plenty Magic compete in the 2009 ANZ Championship. With a team coached by Noeline Taurua and co-captained by Joline Henry and Irene van Dyk, Magic finished the regular season as runners-up to Melbourne Vixens. They subsequently lost the major semi-final to Vixens and the preliminary final to Adelaide Thunderbirds.

== Players ==
=== Player movements ===
In January 2009, Amigene Metcalfe announced her retirement. In March 2009, Joline Henry and Irene van Dyk were named as co-captains. Leana de Bruin returned to Magic after a season with Northern Mystics, while Frances Solia transferred from Central Pulse. The all-international-level starting line-up drew concerns regarding the uneven distribution of top players among New Zealand franchises and allegations of salary cap breaches.

▲ Gains	▼ Losses
Leana de Bruin (Northern Mystics); Elias Shadrock; Frances Solia (Central Pulse); Jessica Tuki (Southern Steel)	Rachel Beale; Keshia Grant (Northern Mystics); Amigene Metcalfe Retirement; Brigette Tapene

=== Roster ===
2009 Waikato Bay of Plenty Magic roster
Players
Coaching staff

Nat.	Name	Position(s)	DoB	Height
(New Zealand)	Leana de Bruin	GD, GK	9 July 1977 (aged 31)	1.90 m (6 ft 3 in)
(New Zealand)	Irene van Dyk (cc)	GS, GA	21 June 1972 (aged 36)	1.90 m (6 ft 3 in)
(New Zealand)	Laura Langman	C, WD	16 April 1986 (aged 22)	1.73 m (5 ft 8 in)
(New Zealand)	Halana Leith	GA, WA		1.76 m (5 ft 9 in)
(New Zealand)	Joline Henry (cc)	GD, WD	29 September 1982 (aged 26)	1.83 m (6 ft 0 in)
(New Zealand)	Nicola Pettit	WD	27 May 1978 (aged 30)	–
(New Zealand)	Elias Shadrock	WA, C, WD	2 July 1990 (aged 18)	1.78 m (5 ft 10 in)
(Samoa)	Frances Solia	C, WA	20 September 1976 (aged 32)	1.69 m (5 ft 7 in)
(New Zealand)	Jodi Tod	GD, WD, GK	4 February 1981 (aged 28)	1.81 m (5 ft 11 in)
(New Zealand)	Jessica Tuki	GK, WA	28 October 1987 (aged 21)	1.85 m (6 ft 1 in)
(New Zealand)	Maria Tutaia	GA, GS	18 February 1987 (aged 22)	1.88 m (6 ft 2 in)
(New Zealand)	Casey Williams	GD, GK	19 June 1985 (aged 23)	1.88 m (6 ft 2 in)

Head coach

- (New Zealand) Noeline Taurua

Notes

- (c) – Captain
- (cc) – Co-captain
- (vc) – Vice-captain
- – Injury / maternity leave
- (TRP) – Temporary Replacement Player

== Pre-season tournaments ==
In early March 2009 Waikato Bay of Plenty Magic played in the 2009 SOPA Cup, hosted by Netball New South Wales at the Sydney Olympic Park Sports Centre. Later in the month Magic hosted and won the Waipa Pre-Season Tournament, defeating Northern Mystics 53–37 in the final.

== Regular season ==
=== Fixtures and results ===
Round 1

Monday 6 April	Northern Mystics	38–51	Waikato Bay of Plenty Magic	Trusts Stadium
7:00 pm	Grace Rasmussen 19/25 (76%); Cathrine Latu 11/12 (92%); Jade Topia 8/11 (73%)	Report; Stats	Irene van Dyk 31/37 (84%); Maria Tutaia 20/27 (74%)

Round 2

Saturday 11 April	Waikato Bay of Plenty Magic	54–47	Southern Steel	Queen Elizabeth Youth Centre
2:00 pm	Irene van Dyk 38/38 (100%); Maria Tutaia 16/19 (84%)	Report; Stats	Daneka Wipiiti 29/38 (76%); Donna Wilkins 18/26 (69%)

Round 3

Monday 20 April	Waikato Bay of Plenty Magic	63–45	New South Wales Swifts	Mystery Creek Events Centre
7:00 pm	Irene van Dyk 45/45 (100%); Maria Tutaia 14/15 (93%); Jessica Tuki 4/5 (80%)	Report; Stats	Catherine Cox 11/12 (92%); Susan Pratley 20/23 (87%); Erin Bell 14/17 (82%)

Round 4

Sunday 26 April	Queensland Firebirds	53–42	Waikato Bay of Plenty Magic	Brisbane Convention and Exhibition Centre
2:30 pm	Romelda Aiken 42/55 (76%); Alissa Castrisos 11/16 (69%)	Report; Stats	Irene van Dyk 30/32 (94%); Maria Tutaia 12/18 (67%)

Round 5

Saturday 2 May	Canterbury Tactix	48–50	Waikato Bay of Plenty Magic	CBS Canterbury Arena
2:00 pm	Jodi Brown 33/38 (87%); Anna Thompson 15/18 (83%)	Stats	Irene van Dyk 29/32 (91%); Maria Tutaia 13/15 (87%); Jessica Tuki 8/14 (57%)

Round 6

Saturday 9 May	Waikato Bay of Plenty Magic	59–36	Central Pulse	Mystery Creek Events Centre
2:00 pm	Irene van Dyk 35/37 (95%); Maria Tutaia 14/20 (70%); Halana Leith 10/11 (91%)	Report; Stats	Paula Griffin 25/35 (71%); Jamilah Gupwell 11/17 (65%)

Round 7

Monday 18 May	Waikato Bay of Plenty Magic	50–35	Northern Mystics	Energy Events Centre
7:00 pm	Irene van Dyk 32/34 (94%); Maria Tutaia 18/22 (82%)	Report; Stats	Cathrine Latu 12/17 (71%); Pamela Cookey 16/20 (80%); Jade Topia 7/9 (78%)

Round 8

Monday 25 May	Southern Steel	39–48	Waikato Bay of Plenty Magic	Stadium Southland
7:00 pm	Daneka Wipiiti 28/38 (74%); Donna Wilkins 11/16 (69%)	Report; Stats	Irene van Dyk 29/33 (88%); Maria Tutaia 10/13 (77%); Jessica Tuki 9/14 (64%)

Round 9

Waikato Bay of Plenty Magic received a bye.

Round 10

Monday 8 June	Waikato Bay of Plenty Magic	55–48	Melbourne Vixens	Queen Elizabeth Youth Centre
19:00 (UTC+10)	Irene van Dyk 35/36 (97%); Maria Tutaia 20/22 (91%)	Report; Stats	Sharelle McMahon 16/22 (73%); Caitlin Thwaites 32/36 (89%)

Round 11

Sunday 14 June	Central Pulse	35–67	Waikato Bay of Plenty Magic	TSB Bank Arena
6:30 pm	Paula Griffin 18/22 (82%); Te Amo Amaru-Tibble 13/15 (87%); Jamilah Gupwell 4/5 (80%)	Report; Stats	Irene van Dyk 29/30 (97%); Maria Tutaia 27/34 (79%); Jessica Tuki 11/14 (79%)

Round 12

Monday 22 June	Waikato Bay of Plenty Magic	50–46	Canterbury Tactix	Energy Events Centre
7:00 pm	Irene van Dyk 32/34 (94%); Maria Tutaia 18/24 (75%)	Report; Stats	Jodi Brown 30/38 (79%); Angela Mitchell 6/10 (60%); Anna Thompson 10/11 (91%)

Round 13

Sunday 28 June	West Coast Fever	38–49	Waikato Bay of Plenty Magic	Challenge Stadium
12:30 pm	Caitlin Bassett 30/40 (75%); Nikala Smith 7/17 (41%); Jasmine Keene 1/1 (100%)	Report; Stats	Irene van Dyk 30/32 (94%); Maria Tutaia 19/24 (79%)

Round 14

Sunday 5 July	Adelaide Thunderbirds	54–35	Waikato Bay of Plenty Magic	Distinctive Homes Dome
2:00 pm	Kate Beveridge 29/35 (83%); Natalie Medhurst 25/29 (86%)	Report; Stats	Irene van Dyk 19/24 (79%); Maria Tutaia 16/23 (70%)

=== Final table ===
2009 ANZ Championship ladder
Pos	Team	Pld	W	D	L	GF	GA	G%	Pts
1	Melbourne Vixens	13	12	0	1	769	614	125.24	24
2	Waikato Bay of Plenty Magic	13	11	0	2	673	562	119.75	22
3	Adelaide Thunderbirds	13	10	0	3	698	579	120.55	20
4	Southern Steel	13	8	0	5	662	645	102.64	16
5	Queensland Firebirds	13	8	0	5	700	690	101.45	16
6	Canterbury Tactix	13	5	0	8	639	662	96.53	10
7	West Coast Fever	13	5	0	8	666	735	90.61	10
8	Northern Mystics	13	3	0	10	642	727	88.31	6
9	New South Wales Swifts	13	2	0	11	709	748	94.79	4
10	Central Pulse	13	1	0	12	594	790	75.19	2
Updated 20 February 2021

Qualified for Major semi-final
Qualified for Minor semi-final

- Pld = Games played
- W = Win (2 points)
- D = Draw (1 point)
- L = Loss (0 points)
- GF = Goals For (Total goals scored)
- GA = Goals Against (Total goals conceded)
- G% = Goal percentage (= 100 × GF/GA)
- Pts = Points

== Playoffs ==
Semifinals
Sunday 12 July – Melbourne
Melbourne Vixens	58
Waikato Bay of Plenty Magic	43
Monday 13 July – Adelaide
Adelaide Thunderbirds	51
Southern Steel	45

Preliminary final
Sunday 19 July – Hamilton
Waikato Bay of Plenty Magic	37
Adelaide Thunderbirds	51

Grand final
Sunday 26 July – Melbourne
Melbourne Vixens	54
Adelaide Thunderbirds	46

=== Major semi-final ===
Sunday 12 July; 14:30 (UTC+10)	Stats	Melbourne Vixens	58–43	Waikato Bay of Plenty Magic	Hisense Arena
Sunday 12 July; 14:30 (UTC+10)	Stats	Scoring by quarter: 16-10, 14-14, 14-7, 14-12			Hisense Arena
Sunday 12 July; 14:30 (UTC+10)	Stats	Caitlin Thwaites 35/41 (85%); Sharelle McMahon 21/22 (95%); Ashlee Howard 2/2 (100%)		Irene van Dyk 24/25 (96%); Maria Tutaia 19/23 (83%)	Hisense Arena

=== Minor semi-final ===
Monday 13 July; 18:30 (UTC+9:30)	Stats	Adelaide Thunderbirds	51–45	Southern Steel	ETSA Park
Monday 13 July; 18:30 (UTC+9:30)	Stats	Scoring by quarter: 12-11, 15-11, 11-10, 13-13			ETSA Park
Monday 13 July; 18:30 (UTC+9:30)	Stats	Kate Beveridge 31/36 (86%); Natalie Medhurst 20/21 (95%)		Megan Dehn 23/27 (85%); Donna Wilkins 22/24 (92%)	ETSA Park

=== Preliminary final ===
Sunday 19 July; 19:00 (UTC+12)	Stats	Waikato Bay of Plenty Magic	37–51	Adelaide Thunderbirds	Mystery Creek Events Centre
Sunday 19 July; 19:00 (UTC+12)	Stats	Scoring by quarter: 8-11, 10-13, 8-14, 11-13			Mystery Creek Events Centre
Sunday 19 July; 19:00 (UTC+12)	Stats	Irene van Dyk 25/26 (96%); Maria Tutaia 12/17 (71%)		Kate Beveridge 28/30 (93%); Natalie Medhurst 22/25 (88%); Jane Altschwager 1/2 (50%)	Mystery Creek Events Centre

=== Grand final ===
Sunday 26 July; 14:30 (UTC+10)	Stats	Melbourne Vixens	54–46	Adelaide Thunderbirds	Hisense Arena; Attendance: 9,500
Sunday 26 July; 14:30 (UTC+10)	Stats	Scoring by quarter: 13-13, 14-6, 14-13, 13-14			Hisense Arena; Attendance: 9,500
Sunday 26 July; 14:30 (UTC+10)	Stats	Caitlin Thwaites 31/39 (79%); Sharelle McMahon 23/28 (82%)		Kate Beveridge 28/34 (82%); Natalie Medhurst 18/23 (78%); Jane Altschwager 1/2 (50%)	Hisense Arena; Attendance: 9,500

=== Major semi-final ===
Sunday 12 July; 14:30 (UTC+10)	Stats	Melbourne Vixens	58–43	Waikato Bay of Plenty Magic	Hisense Arena
Sunday 12 July; 14:30 (UTC+10)	Stats	Scoring by quarter: 16-10, 14-14, 14-7, 14-12			Hisense Arena
Sunday 12 July; 14:30 (UTC+10)	Stats	Caitlin Thwaites 35/41 (85%); Sharelle McMahon 21/22 (95%); Ashlee Howard 2/2 (100%)		Irene van Dyk 24/25 (96%); Maria Tutaia 19/23 (83%)	Hisense Arena

=== Preliminary final ===
Sunday 19 July; 19:00 (UTC+12)	Stats	Waikato Bay of Plenty Magic	37–51	Adelaide Thunderbirds	Mystery Creek Events Centre
Sunday 19 July; 19:00 (UTC+12)	Stats	Scoring by quarter: 8-11, 10-13, 8-14, 11-13			Mystery Creek Events Centre
Sunday 19 July; 19:00 (UTC+12)	Stats	Irene van Dyk 25/26 (96%); Maria Tutaia 12/17 (71%)		Kate Beveridge 28/30 (93%); Natalie Medhurst 22/25 (88%); Jane Altschwager 1/2 (50%)	Mystery Creek Events Centre

== Gallery ==
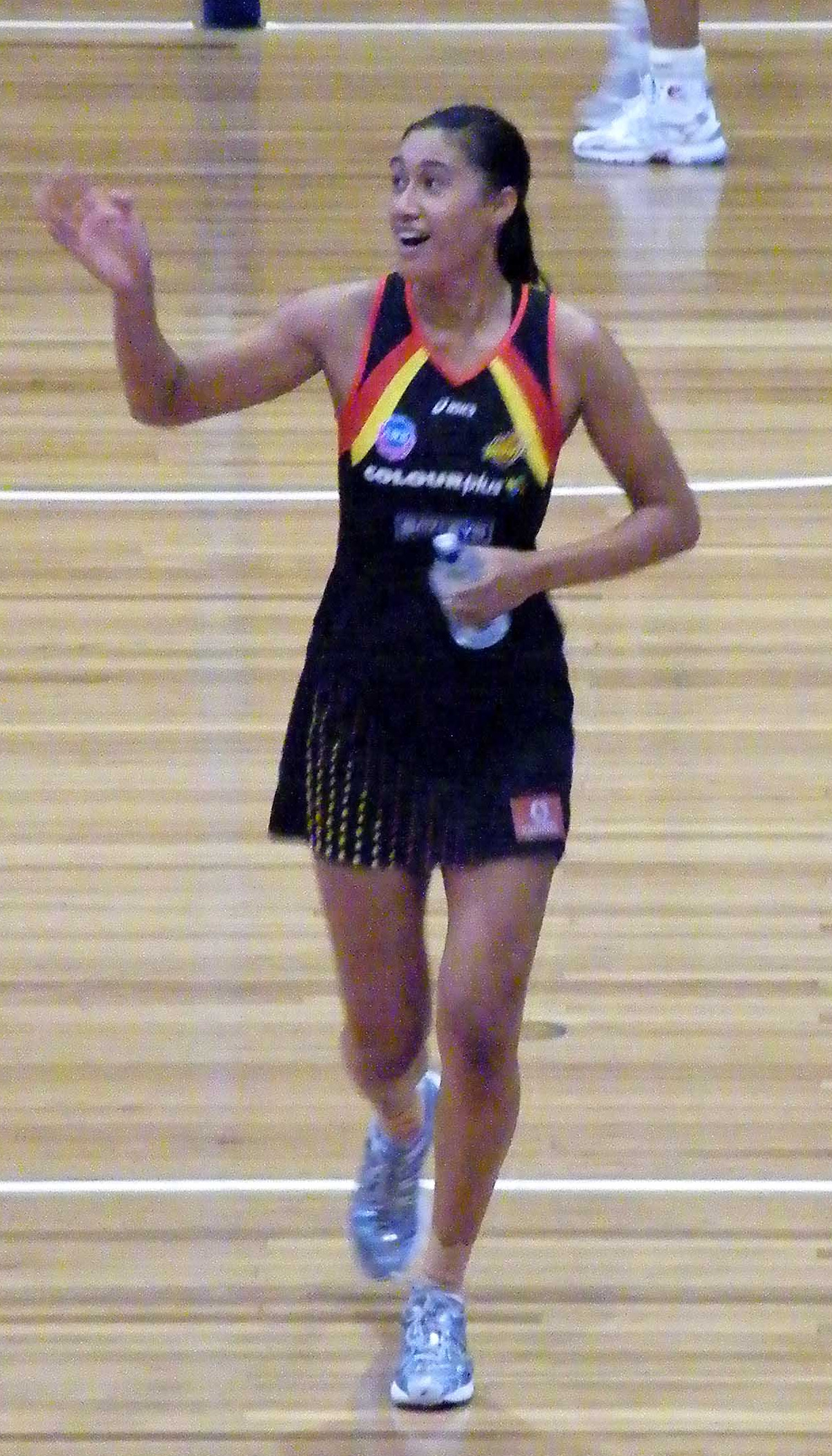
7 March 2009; Maria Tutaia playing for Waikato Bay of Plenty Magic during the pre-season tournament, the 2009 SOPA Cup.
