= 2008 Waikato Bay of Plenty Magic season =

WBoP Magic season

Waikato Bay of Plenty Magic
- 2008 season
- Head coach: Noeline Taurua
- Asst. coach: Hikitia Gallagher
- Captain: Amigene Metcalfe
- Main venue: Mystery Creek Events Centre; Energy Events Centre

Season results
- Wins–losses: 11–5
- Regular season: 1st
- Finals placing: 2nd
- Team colours

Waikato Bay of Plenty Magic seasons
- ← 2007 2009 →

The 2008 Waikato Bay of Plenty Magic season saw Waikato Bay of Plenty Magic compete in the 2008 ANZ Championship. With a team coached by Noeline Taurua, captained by Amigene Metcalfe and featuring Irene van Dyk, Magic finished the season as minor premiers and overall runners-up. During the regular season Magic won 10 of their 13 matches and finished above eventual champions New South Wales Swifts. Magic subsequently lost to Swifts in the major semi–final, defeated Adelaide Thunderbirds in the preliminary final before losing the grand final to Swifts. Irene van Dyk finished the season as the ANZ Championship top scorer, scoring 529 goals from 570 attempts with a 93% goal rate.

== Players ==
=== Player movements ===
| ▲ Gains | ▼ Losses |
|---|---|
| Rachel Beale; Keshia Grant; Halana Leith; Brigette Tapene; Jodi Tod; Maria Tutaia (Auckland Diamonds) | Katrina Anderson; Nicola Browne; Tanya Lund; Louise Moffat; Anna Stanley Retirement; Asha Tett (Brunel Hurricanes); Kahurangi Waititi (Central Pulse) |

=== Roster ===
2008 Waikato Bay of Plenty Magic roster
Players
Coaching staff

| Nat. | Name | Position(s) | DoB | Height |
|---|---|---|---|---|
| (New Zealand) | Rachel Beale | GD, GK | 9 July 1983 (aged 24) | 1.85 m (6 ft 1 in) |
| (New Zealand) | Irene van Dyk | GS, GA | 21 June 1972 (aged 35) | 1.90 m (6 ft 3 in) |
| (New Zealand) | Keshia Grant | WA, C | 11 January 1987 (aged 21) | 1.64 m (5 ft 5 in) |
| (New Zealand) | Joline Henry | GD, WD | 29 September 1982 (aged 25) | 1.83 m (6 ft 0 in) |
| (New Zealand) | Laura Langman | C, WD | 16 April 1986 (aged 21) | 1.73 m (5 ft 8 in) |
| (New Zealand) | Halana Leith | GA, WA | | 1.76 m (5 ft 9 in) |
| (New Zealand) | Amigene Metcalfe (c) | WA, C | 17 January 1974 (aged 34) | 1.68 m (5 ft 6 in) |
| (New Zealand) | Nicola Pettit | WD | 27 May 1978 (aged 29) | – |
| (New Zealand) | Brigette Tapene | | 6 February 1985 (aged 23) | 1.78 m (5 ft 10 in) |
| (New Zealand) | Jodi Tod | GD, WD, GK | 4 February 1981 (aged 27) | 1.81 m (5 ft 11 in) |
| (New Zealand) | Maria Tutaia | GA, GS | 18 February 1987 (aged 21) | 1.88 m (6 ft 2 in) |
| (New Zealand) | Casey Williams | GD, GK | 19 June 1985 (aged 22) | 1.88 m (6 ft 2 in) |

Head coach

- (New Zealand) Noeline Taurua

Assistant coach

- (New Zealand) Hikitia Gallagher

Notes

- (c) – Captain
- (cc) – Co-captain
- (vc) – Vice-captain
- – Injury / maternity leave
- (TRP) – Temporary Replacement Player

== Waipa Pre-Season Tournament ==
In March 2008 at the Waipa Pre-Season Tournament at the Te Awamutu Event Centre, Magic played four and won four against New South Wales Swifts, Australian Institute of Sport, Canterbury Tactix and Central Pulse.

== Regular season ==
=== Fixtures and results ===
Round 1

| Monday 7 April | Waikato Bay of Plenty Magic | 46–42 | Adelaide Thunderbirds | Energy Events Centre |
| 7:00 pm | Irene van Dyk 28/36 (78%); Maria Tutaia 18/25 (72%) | Stats | Kristen Hughes 24/32 (75%); Natalie Medhurst 18/21 (86%) | Umpires: Bobbi Brown; Mandy Nottingham; Reserve umpire: Bronwyn Meek |

Round 2

| Sunday 13 April | Waikato Bay of Plenty Magic | 56–52 | Northern Mystics | Energy Events Centre |
| 5:30 pm | Irene van Dyk 31/38 (82%); Maria Tutaia 25/31 (81%) | Stats | Cathrine Latu 29/34 (85%); Jade Topia 23/26 (88%) | Umpires: Bobbi Brown; Bronwyn Meek; Reserve umpire: Pauline Sciascia |

Round 3

| Saturday 19 April | New South Wales Swifts | 50–47 | Waikato Bay of Plenty Magic | Newcastle Entertainment Centre |
| 2:30 pm | Catherine Cox 31/38 (82%); Susan Pratley 19/22 (86%) | Report; Stats | Irene van Dyk 29/32 (91%); Maria Tutaia 18/23 (78%) | Umpires: Sharon Kelly; Helen George; Reserve umpire: Collette Brennan |

Round 4

| Saturday 26 April | Waikato Bay of Plenty Magic | 61–47 | West Coast Fever | Mystery Creek Events Centre |
| 2:30 pm | Irene van Dyk 35/37 (95%); Maria Tutaia 26/33 (79%) | Report; Stats | Caitlin Bassett 35/38 (92%); Nikala Smith 4/5 (80%); Bianca Franklin 8/10 (80%) | Umpires: Bronwyn Meek; Mandy Nottingham; Reserve umpire: Pauline Sciascia |

Round 5

| Saturday 3 May | Waikato Bay of Plenty Magic | 54–37 | Central Pulse | Mystery Creek Events Centre |
| 2:30 pm | Irene van Dyk 40/41 (98%); Maria Tutaia 11/15 (73%); Halana Leith 3/4 (75%) | Report; Stats | Susan Tagicakibau 18/20 (90%); Amber Bellringer 19/27 (70%) | Umpires: Jonathon Bredin; Pauline Sciascia; Reserve umpire: Bronwyn Meek |

Round 6

| Monday 12 May | Northern Mystics | 45–59 | Waikato Bay of Plenty Magic | Trusts Stadium |
| 7:00 pm | Cathrine Latu 30/34 (88%); Jade Topia 15/23 (65%) | Report; Stats | Irene van Dyk 36/39 (92%); Maria Tutaia 23/29 (79%) |

Round 7

| Monday 19 May | Waikato Bay of Plenty Magic | 56–47 | Southern Steel | Mystery Creek Events Centre |
| 7:00 pm | Irene van Dyk 33/33 (100%); Maria Tutaia 23/26 (88%) | Stats | Daneka Wipiiti 34/35 (97%); Megan Dehn 13/16 (81%) |

Round 8

| Saturday 24 May | Canterbury Tactix | 50–54 | Waikato Bay of Plenty Magic | Westpac Arena |
| 2:30 pm | Rachel Dunn 35/41 (85%); Anna Thompson 15/19 (79%) | Report; Stats | Irene van Dyk 32/33 (97%); Maria Tutaia 22/29 (76%) |

Round 9

Waikato Bay of Plenty Magic received a bye.

Round 10

| Sunday 8 June | Waikato Bay of Plenty Magic | 56–50 | Queensland Firebirds | Energy Events Centre |
| 5:30 pm | Irene van Dyk 40/48 (83%); Maria Tutaia 16/21 (76%) | Report; Stats | Romelda Aiken 39/46 (85%); Janelle Lawson 1/3 (33%); Tamsin Greenway 10/14 (71%) |

Round 11

| Monday 16 June | Melbourne Vixens | 47–40 | Waikato Bay of Plenty Magic | State Netball Hockey Centre |
| 7:00 pm | Sharelle McMahon 26/31 (84%); Caitlin Thwaites 9/15 (60%); Abby Sargent 12/19 (63%) | Report; Stats | Irene van Dyk 25/28 (89%); Maria Tutaia 15/25 (60%) | Umpires: Sharon Kelly; Rachael Ayre; Reserve umpire: Kate Wright |

Round 12

| Saturday 21 June | Central Pulse | 41–46 | Waikato Bay of Plenty Magic | TSB Bank Arena |
| 2:30 pm | Susan Tagicakibau 26/32 (81%); Jamilah Gupwell 15/18 (83%) | Report; Stats | Irene van Dyk 35/36 (97%); Maria Tutaia 11/14 (79%) | Umpires: Alison Cormack; David Pala'amo; Reserve umpire: Pauline Sciascia |

Round 13

| Monday 30 June | Southern Steel | 47–43 | Waikato Bay of Plenty Magic | Stadium Southland |
| 7:00 pm | Daneka Wipiiti 30/44 (68%); Julianna Naoupu 6/9 (67%); Megan Dehn 11/12 (92%) | Report; Stats | Irene van Dyk 27/27 (100%); Maria Tutaia 16/24 (67%) | Umpires: Bronwyn Meek; Pauline Sciascia; Reserve umpire: Jonathon Bredin |

Round 14

| Saturday 5 July | Waikato Bay of Plenty Magic | 69–44 | Canterbury Tactix | Mystery Creek Events Centre |
| 2:30 pm | Irene van Dyk 33/35 (94%); Maria Tutaia 36/41 (88%) | Report; Stats | Rachel Dunn 24/28 (86%); Anna Thompson 16/22 (73%); Hayley Stockman 4/5 (80%) | Umpires: Bobbi Brown; Bronwyn Meek; Reserve umpire: Pauline Sciascia |

=== Final table ===
2008 ANZ Championship season
| | Team | Pld | W | D | L | GF | GA | G% | Pts |
|---|---|---|---|---|---|---|---|---|---|
| 1 | Waikato Bay of Plenty Magic | 13 | 10 | 0 | 3 | 687 | 599 | 114.69 | 20 |
| 2 | New South Wales Swifts | 13 | 10 | 0 | 3 | 727 | 652 | 111.50 | 20 |
| 3 | Adelaide Thunderbirds | 13 | 9 | 0 | 4 | 652 | 577 | 113.00 | 18 |
| 4 | Melbourne Vixens | 13 | 9 | 0 | 4 | 673 | 620 | 108.55 | 18 |
| 5 | Queensland Firebirds | 13 | 7 | 0 | 6 | 693 | 645 | 107.44 | 14 |
| 6 | Southern Steel | 13 | 7 | 0 | 6 | 617 | 616 | 100.16 | 14 |
| 7 | Northern Mystics | 13 | 5 | 0 | 8 | 625 | 637 | 98.12 | 10 |
| 8 | Canterbury Tactix | 13 | 5 | 0 | 8 | 607 | 678 | 89.53 | 10 |
| 9 | West Coast Fever ^{(Note 3)} | 13 | 2 | 1 | 10 | 605 | 697 | 86.80 | 5 |
| 10 | Central Pulse ^{(Note 3)} | 13 | 0 | 1 | 12 | 471 | 636 | 74.06 | 1 |
Updated: 17 February 2021

Qualified for Major semi-final
Qualified for Minor semi-final

- Pld = Games played
- W = Win (2 points)
- D = Draw (1 point)
- L = Loss (0 points)
- GF = Goals For (Total goals scored)
- GA = Goals Against (Total goals conceded)
- G% = Goal percentage (= 100 × GF/GA)
- Pts = Points

Notes

- ^3 The Round 10 match between West Coast Fever and Central Pulse was called off due to a stadium leak. The match was declared a draw, with each team receiving one point. Fever were leading 33–16 when the match was called off. The goals scored by each team were included in the final table.

== Playoffs ==
Semifinals
13 July
Waikato Bay of Plenty Magic | 56
New South Wales Swifts | 57
14 July
Adelaide Thunderbirds | 53
Melbourne Vixens | 48

Preliminary final
21 July
Waikato Bay of Plenty Magic | 51
Adelaide Thunderbirds | 49

Grand final
28 July
New South Wales Swifts | 65
Waikato Bay of Plenty Magic | 56

=== Major semi-final ===
| Sunday 13 July; 17:30 (UTC+12) | Stats | Waikato Bay of Plenty Magic | 56–57 | New South Wales Swifts | Mystery Creek Events Centre; Umpires: Jacqui Jashari; Bronwyn Meek; Reserve umpire: Mandy Nottingham | FOXSports; SKYSport |
| Sunday 13 July; 17:30 (UTC+12) | Stats | Scoring by quarter: 15-16, 17-14, 9-17, 15-10 | | | Mystery Creek Events Centre; Umpires: Jacqui Jashari; Bronwyn Meek; Reserve umpire: Mandy Nottingham | FOXSports; SKYSport |
| Sunday 13 July; 17:30 (UTC+12) | Stats | Irene van Dyk 29/29 (100%); Maria Tutaia 27/34 (79%) | | Catherine Cox 41/48 (85%); Susan Pratley 16/19 (84%) | Mystery Creek Events Centre; Umpires: Jacqui Jashari; Bronwyn Meek; Reserve umpire: Mandy Nottingham | FOXSports; SKYSport |

=== Minor semi-final ===
| Monday 14 July; 16:30 (UTC+9:30) | Stats | Adelaide Thunderbirds | 53–48 | Melbourne Vixens | ETSA Park; Umpires: Rachael Ayre; Bobbi Brown; Reserve umpire: Helen George | FOXSports; SKYSport |
| Monday 14 July; 16:30 (UTC+9:30) | Stats | Scoring by quarter: 8–16, 16–8, 12–14, 17–10 | | | ETSA Park; Umpires: Rachael Ayre; Bobbi Brown; Reserve umpire: Helen George | FOXSports; SKYSport |
| Monday 14 July; 16:30 (UTC+9:30) | Stats | Kate Beveridge 38/44 (86%); Natalie Medhurst 15/20 (75%) | | Caitlin Thwaites 28/37 (76%); Sharelle McMahon 20/21 (95%) | ETSA Park; Umpires: Rachael Ayre; Bobbi Brown; Reserve umpire: Helen George | FOXSports; SKYSport |

=== Preliminary final ===
| Monday 21 July; 19:00 (UTC+12) | Stats | Waikato Bay of Plenty Magic | 51–49 | Adelaide Thunderbirds | Mystery Creek Events Centre; Umpires: Sharon Kelly; Bronwyn Meek; Reserve umpire: Bobbi Brown | FOXSports; SKYSport |
| Monday 21 July; 19:00 (UTC+12) | Stats | Scoring by quarter: 17–14, 12–11, 12–11, 10–13 | | | Mystery Creek Events Centre; Umpires: Sharon Kelly; Bronwyn Meek; Reserve umpire: Bobbi Brown | FOXSports; SKYSport |
| Monday 21 July; 19:00 (UTC+12) | Stats | Irene van Dyk 31/32 (97%); Maria Tutaia 20/23 (87%) | | Kate Beveridge 29/34 (85%); Natalie Medhurst 20/22 (91%) | Mystery Creek Events Centre; Umpires: Sharon Kelly; Bronwyn Meek; Reserve umpire: Bobbi Brown | FOXSports; SKYSport |

=== Grand final ===
| Monday 28 July; 19:00 (UTC+10) | Stats | New South Wales Swifts | 65–56 | Waikato Bay of Plenty Magic | Acer Arena; Attendance: 12,999; Umpires: Sharon Kelly; Bronwyn Meek; Reserve umpire: Jacqui Jashari | FOXSports; SKYSport |
| Monday 28 July; 19:00 (UTC+10) | Stats | Scoring by quarter: 19-14, 15-14, 16-17, 15-11 | | | Acer Arena; Attendance: 12,999; Umpires: Sharon Kelly; Bronwyn Meek; Reserve umpire: Jacqui Jashari | FOXSports; SKYSport |
| Monday 28 July; 19:00 (UTC+10) | Stats | Catherine Cox 41/46 (89%); Susan Pratley 24/30 (80%) | | Irene van Dyk 45/46 (98%); Maria Tutaia 11/15 (73%) | Acer Arena; Attendance: 12,999; Umpires: Sharon Kelly; Bronwyn Meek; Reserve umpire: Jacqui Jashari | FOXSports; SKYSport |
