= 2010 Waikato Bay of Plenty Magic season =

WBoP Magic season

Waikato Bay of Plenty Magic
- 2010 season
- Head coach: Noeline Taurua
- Captain: Laura Langman
- Main venue: Mystery Creek Events Centre; Energy Events Centre

Season results
- Wins–losses: 11–5
- Regular season: 3rd
- Finals placing: 2nd
- Team colours

Waikato Bay of Plenty Magic seasons
- ← 2009 2011 →

The 2010 Waikato Bay of Plenty Magic season saw Waikato Bay of Plenty Magic compete in the 2010 ANZ Championship. With a team coached by Noeline Taurua and captained by Laura Langman, Magic finished the regular season third behind New South Wales Swifts and Adelaide Thunderbirds. They subsequently defeated Southern Steel in the minor semi-final and Swifts in the preliminary final but lost to Thunderbirds in the grand final.

== Players ==
=== Player movements ===
▲ Gains	▼ Losses
Jodi Brown (Canterbury Tactix); Amy Christophers; Jade Clarke (Northern Thunder); Tanya Lund; Peta Scholz (Oakdale); Kahurangi Waititi (Canterbury Tactix)	Leana de Bruin (Southern Steel); Joline Henry (Northern Mystics); Halana Leith; Nicola Pettit; Maria Tutaia (Northern Mystics)

=== Roster ===
2010 Waikato Bay of Plenty Magic roster
Players
Coaching staff

Nat.	Name	Position(s)	DoB	Height
(New Zealand)	Jodi Brown	GA, GS	6 May 1981 (aged 28)	1.85 m (6 ft 1 in)
(New Zealand)	Amy Christophers	GK, GD		–
(England)	Jade Clarke (TRP)	WD, C, WA	17 October 1983 (aged 26)	1.74 m (5 ft 9 in)
(New Zealand)	Irene van Dyk	GS, GA	21 June 1972 (aged 37)	1.90 m (6 ft 3 in)
(New Zealand)	Laura Langman (c)	C, WD	16 April 1986 (aged 23)	1.73 m (5 ft 8 in)
(New Zealand)	Tanya Lund	GA, WA		–
(Australia)	Peta Scholz (injured)	WD, C, GD	17 January 1976 (aged 34)	1.80 m (5 ft 11 in)
(New Zealand)	Elias Shadrock	WA, C, WD	2 July 1990 (aged 19)	1.78 m (5 ft 10 in)
(Samoa)	Frances Solia	C, WA	20 September 1976 (aged 33)	1.69 m (5 ft 7 in)
(New Zealand)	Jodi Tod	GD, WD, GK	4 February 1981 (aged 29)	1.81 m (5 ft 11 in)
(New Zealand)	Jessica Tuki	GK, WA	28 October 1987 (aged 22)	1.85 m (6 ft 1 in)
(New Zealand)	Kahurangi Waititi	GK, GD	22 September 1982 (aged 27)	1.84 m (6 ft 0 in)
(New Zealand)	Casey Williams	GD, GK	19 June 1985 (aged 24)	1.88 m (6 ft 2 in)

Head coach

- (New Zealand) Noeline Taurua

Notes

- (c) – Captain
- (cc) – Co-captain
- (vc) – Vice-captain
- – Injury / maternity leave
- (TRP) – Temporary Replacement Player

== Regular season ==
=== Fixtures and results ===
Round 1

Monday 22 March	Melbourne Vixens	48 – 40	Waikato Bay of Plenty Magic	Hisense Arena
19:05 (UTC+11)	Sharelle McMahon 23/27 (85%); Caitlin Thwaites 25/32 (78%)	Report; Stats	Jodi Brown 10/13 (77%); Jessica Tuki 11/19 (58%); Irene van Dyk 19/22 (86%)	Umpires: Sharon Kelly

Round 2

Monday 29 March	Waikato Bay of Plenty Magic	47 – 41	Southern Steel	Energy Events Centre
19:20 (UTC+13)	Jodi Brown 20/24 (83%); Irene van Dyk 27/30 (90%)	Report; Stats	Megan Dehn 12/14 (86%); Julianna Naoupu 29/34 (85%)	Umpires: Liz Boon, Bronwyn Meek

Round 3

Saturday 3 April	Northern Mystics	46 – 55	Waikato Bay of Plenty Magic	Trusts Stadium
14:20 (UTC+13)	Cathrine Latu 31/36 (86%); Maria Tutaia 15/23 (65%)	Report; Stats	Jodi Brown 21/26 (81%); Irene van Dyk 34/35 (97%)

Round 4

Saturday 10 April	Waikato Bay of Plenty Magic	55 – 50	West Coast Fever	Mystery Creek Events Centre
14:20 (UTC+12)	Jodi Brown 14/21 (67%); Irene van Dyk 41/42 (98%)	Report; Stats	Caitlin Bassett 35/37 (95%); Leah Shoard 15/22 (68%)

Round 5

Sunday 18 April	Canterbury Tactix	36 – 53	Waikato Bay of Plenty Magic	CBS Canterbury Arena
18:50 (UTC+12)	Anna Thompson 17/25 (68%); Ellen Halpenny 19/32 (59%)	Report; Stats	Jodi Brown 24/32 (75%); Jessica Tuki 3/6 (50%); Irene van Dyk 26/27 (96%)

Round 6

Waikato Bay of Plenty Magic received a bye.

Round 7

Monday 3 May	Waikato Bay of Plenty Magic	49 – 46	Northern Mystics	Mystery Creek Events Centre
19:20 (UTC+12)	Jodi Brown 12/14 (86%); Irene van Dyk 37/40 (93%)	Report; Stats	Cathrine Latu 25/30 (83%); Maria Tutaia 21/25 (84%)

Round 8

Saturday 8 May	Waikato Bay of Plenty Magic	56 – 44	Central Pulse	Energy Events Centre
14:20 (UTC+12)	Jodi Brown 6/8 (75%); Tanya Lund 10/13 (77%); Irene van Dyk 40/42 (95%)	Report; Stats	Jane Altschwager 18/25 (72%); Paula Griffin 26/32 (81%)

Round 9

Saturday 15 May	Waikato Bay of Plenty Magic	72 – 52	Canterbury Tactix	Mystery Creek Events Centre
14:20 (UTC+12)	Jodi Brown 24/29 (83%); Irene van Dyk 48/50 (96%)	Report; Stats	Ellen Halpenny 6/8 (75%); Angela Mitchell 14/21 (67%); Anna Thompson 32/36 (89%)

Round 10

Monday 24 May	Southern Steel	52 – 47	Waikato Bay of Plenty Magic	Stadium Southland
19:20 (UTC+12)	Megan Dehn 20/22 (91%); Daneka Wipiiti 32/34 (94%)	Report; Stats	Jodi Brown 18/25 (72%); Irene van Dyk 29/32 (91%)

Round 11

Monday 31 May	Waikato Bay of Plenty Magic	54 – 55	Queensland Firebirds	Energy Events Centre
19:20 (UTC+12)	Jodi Brown 22/27 (81%); Irene van Dyk 32/34 (94%)	Stats	Romelda Aiken 35/37 (95%); Natalie Medhurst 20/21 (95%)

Round 12

Monday 7 June	New South Wales Swifts	60 – 43	Waikato Bay of Plenty Magic	Sydney Olympic Park Sports Centre
19:05 (UTC+10)	Catherine Cox 31/39 (79%); Susan Pratley 29/34 (85%)	Report; Stats	Jodi Brown 16/19 (84%); Irene van Dyk 27/29 (93%)

Round 13

Saturday 12 June	Central Pulse	52 – 58	Waikato Bay of Plenty Magic	Pettigrew Green Arena
14:20 (UTC+12)	Paula Griffin 31/38 (82%); Jamilah Gupwell 21/25 (84%)	Stats	Jodi Brown 11/13 (85%); Tanya Lund 5/8 (63%); Irene van Dyk 42/42 (100%)

Round 14

Saturday 19 June	Waikato Bay of Plenty Magic	53 – 44	Adelaide Thunderbirds	Energy Events Centre
14:20 (UTC+12)	Jodi Brown 16/17 (94%); Irene van Dyk 37/43 (86%)	Stats	Erin Bell 7/9 (78%); Kate Beveridge 11/17 (65%); Carla Borrego 26/31 (84%)

=== Final table ===
2010 ANZ Championship ladder
Pos	Team	Pld	W	L	GF	GA	PP	Pts	Qualification
1	New South Wales Swifts	13	13	0	704	570	123.5	26	Qualified for Major semi-final
2	Adelaide Thunderbirds	13	9	4	681	586	116.2	18	Qualified for Major semi-final
3	Waikato Bay of Plenty Magic	13	9	4	682	626	108.9	18	Qualified for Minor semi-final
4	Southern Steel	13	8	5	644	597	107.9	16	Qualified for Minor semi-final
5	Queensland Firebirds	13	7	6	717	629	114.0	14	
6	Northern Mystics	13	7	6	696	702	99.1	14	
7	Melbourne Vixens	13	6	7	651	680	95.7	12	
8	West Coast Fever	13	4	9	679	718	94.6	8	
9	Central Pulse	13	1	12	594	742	80.1	2	
10	Canterbury Tactix	13	1	12	571	769	74.3	2	

Rules for classification: 2 points for a win, 0 points for a loss.

== Playoffs ==
=== Minor semi-final ===
Monday 28 June; 19:20 (UTC+12)	Stats	Waikato Bay of Plenty Magic	50–42	Southern Steel	Vector Arena; Umpires: Sharon Kelly (Australia); Mandy Nottingham (New Zealand)
Monday 28 June; 19:20 (UTC+12)	Stats	Scoring by quarter: 16-8, 8-13, 14-11, 12-10			Vector Arena; Umpires: Sharon Kelly (Australia); Mandy Nottingham (New Zealand)
Monday 28 June; 19:20 (UTC+12)	Stats	Irene van Dyk 41/46 (89%); Jodi Brown 9/11 (82%)		Megan Dehn 24/25 (96%); Daneka Wipiiti 11/17 (65%); Julianna Naoupu 7/9 (78%)	Vector Arena; Umpires: Sharon Kelly (Australia); Mandy Nottingham (New Zealand)

=== Preliminary final ===
Sunday 4 July; 14:50 (UTC+10)	Stats	New South Wales Swifts	49–54	Waikato Bay of Plenty Magic	Newcastle Entertainment Centre; Umpires: Sharon Kelly (Australia); Mandy Nottingham (New Zealand)
Sunday 4 July; 14:50 (UTC+10)	Stats	Scoring by quarter: 11-12, 9-17, 12-13, 17-12			Newcastle Entertainment Centre; Umpires: Sharon Kelly (Australia); Mandy Nottingham (New Zealand)
Sunday 4 July; 14:50 (UTC+10)	Stats	Catherine Cox 32/38 (84%); Susan Pratley 17/21 (81%)		Irene van Dyk 43/44 (98%); Jodi Brown 11/13 (85%)	Newcastle Entertainment Centre; Umpires: Sharon Kelly (Australia); Mandy Nottingham (New Zealand)

=== Grand final ===
Sunday 11 July; 14:30 (UTC+9:30)	Stats	Adelaide Thunderbirds	52–42	Waikato Bay of Plenty Magic	Adelaide Entertainment Centre; Attendance: 9,300; Umpires: Sharon Kelly (Australia); Mandy Nottingham (New Zealand)
Sunday 11 July; 14:30 (UTC+9:30)	Stats	Scoring by quarter: 15-8, 13-13, 11-8, 13-13			Adelaide Entertainment Centre; Attendance: 9,300; Umpires: Sharon Kelly (Australia); Mandy Nottingham (New Zealand)
Sunday 11 July; 14:30 (UTC+9:30)	Stats	Carla Borrego 40/46 (87%); Erin Bell 12/19 (63%)		Irene van Dyk 30/33 (91%); Jodi Brown 12/16 (75%)	Adelaide Entertainment Centre; Attendance: 9,300; Umpires: Sharon Kelly (Australia); Mandy Nottingham (New Zealand)

== Gallery ==
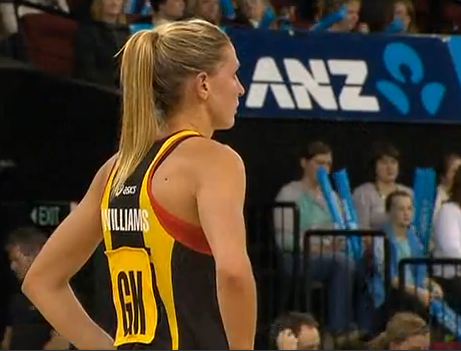
11 July 2010; Casey Williams playing for Waikato Bay of Plenty Magic against Adelaide Thunderbirds in the 2010 ANZ Championship grand final.
