= 2008 ANZ Championship season =

Netball league season

- League: ANZ Championship
- Sport: Netball
- Duration: 5 April 2008 – 28 July 2008
- Teams: 10
- TV partner(s): Fox Sports (Australia); Sky Sport (New Zealand)
- Champions: New South Wales Swifts
- Runners-up: Waikato Bay of Plenty Magic
- Minor premiers: Waikato Bay of Plenty Magic
- Season MVP: Romelda Aiken (Firebirds); Sonia Mkoloma (Pulse)
- Top scorer: Irene van Dyk (Magic)

ANZ Championship seasons
- 2009 →

The 2008 ANZ Championship season was the inaugural season of the ANZ Championship. The 2008 season began on 5 April and concluded on 28 July. Waikato Bay of Plenty Magic were minor premiers after finishing top of the table following the regular season. New South Wales Swifts, with a team coached by Julie Fitzgerald and captained by Catherine Cox, won 10 of their 13 matches and finished second behind Magic. Swifts subsequently defeated Magic in both the major semi–final and the grand final to become the inaugural ANZ Championship winners. The grand final was played on 28 July at Acer Arena. Overall, 6792 goals were scored during the season, averaging 98.44 per match. Fox Sports (Australia) and Sky Sport (New Zealand) attracted an average audience per match of 56,581.

== Transfers ==
Player	2007 team	2008 team
(Australia) Mo'onia Gerrard	Sydney Swifts	Adelaide Thunderbirds
(England) Geva Mentor	Team Bath	Adelaide Thunderbirds
(Australia) Kate Beveridge	Perth Orioles	Adelaide Thunderbirds
(Australia) Rebecca Bulley	Melbourne Kestrels	New South Wales Swifts
(Jamaica) Romelda Aiken	Jamalco	Queensland Firebirds
(England) Tamsin Greenway	Team Bath	Queensland Firebirds
(Australia) Janelle Lawson	AIS Canberra Darters	Queensland Firebirds
(Australia) Joanne Morgan		Queensland Firebirds
(England) Ama Agbeze	Loughborough Lightning	West Coast Fever
(England) Karen Atkinson	Mavericks	West Coast Fever
(Australia) Ingrid Dick	Melbourne Phoenix	West Coast Fever
(New Zealand) Jodi Brown	Otago Rebels	Canterbury Tactix
(England) Rachel Dunn	Team Bath	Canterbury Tactix
(Australia) Demelza Fellowes	Otago Rebels	Canterbury Tactix
(England) Sonia Mkoloma	Brunel Hurricanes	Central Pulse
(Samoa) Frances Solia		Central Pulse
(Samoa) Cathrine Latu	Northern Force	Northern Mystics
(New Zealand) Jenny-May Coffin	Auckland Diamonds	Southern Steel
(Australia) Megan Dehn	Sydney Swifts/Northern Force	Southern Steel
(New Zealand) Maria Tutaia	Auckland Diamonds	Waikato Bay of Plenty Magic

== Head coaches and captains ==
Team	Head coach	Captain
Adelaide Thunderbirds	Jane Woodlands-Thompson	Natalie von Bertouch
Melbourne Vixens	Julie Hoornweg	Sharelle McMahon; Bianca Chatfield
New South Wales Swifts	Julie Fitzgerald	Catherine Cox
Queensland Firebirds	Vicki Wilson	Peta Stephens
West Coast Fever	Sue Gaudion	Stacey Rosman
Canterbury Tactix	Helen Mahon-Stroud	Julie Seymour
Central Pulse	Kate Carpenter	Frances Solia
Northern Mystics	Yvonne Willering	Temepara George
Southern Steel	Robyn Broughton	Jenny-May Coffin; Megan Hutton
Waikato Bay of Plenty Magic	Noeline Taurua	Amigene Metcalfe

== Regular season ==
During the regular season the Australian teams played each other twice and the New Zealand teams once. The New Zealand teams also played each other twice and each of the Australian teams once.

=== Round 1 ===
Saturday 5 April	Central Pulse	33–50	Melbourne Vixens	TSB Bank Arena
2:30 pm	Susan Tagicakibau 13/20 (65%); Jamilah Gupwell 15/20 (75%); Amber Bellringer 5/7 (71%)	Report; Stats	Sharelle McMahon 16/21 (76%); Caitlin Thwaites 34/42 (81%)	Umpires: Alison Cormack; Pauline Sciascia; Reserve umpire: David Pala'amo

Sunday 6 April	Queensland Firebirds	48–46	West Coast Fever	Brisbane Convention & Exhibition Centre
1:00 pm	Romelda Aiken 32/37 (86%); Janelle Lawson 8/17 (47%); Joanne Morgan 5/10 (50%); Tamsin Greenway 3/4 (75%)	Stats	Caitlin Bassett 37/44 (84%); Nikala Smith 6/9 (67%); Bianca Franklin 3/6 (50%)	Umpires: Pauline Francisco; Raechel Richards; Reserve umpire: Helen George

Sunday 6 April	Northern Mystics	44–48	Canterbury Tactix	Trusts Stadium
5:30 pm	Paula Griffin 16/19 (84%); Cathrine Latu 15/20 (75%); Jade Topia 13/15 (87%)	Report; Stats	Jodi Brown 38/43 (88%); Anna Thompson 10/16 (63%)	Umpires: Bronwyn Meek; David Pala'amo; Reserve umpire: Mandy Nottingham

Monday 7 April	Waikato Bay of Plenty Magic	46–42	Adelaide Thunderbirds	Energy Events Centre
7:00 pm	Irene van Dyk 28/36 (78%); Maria Tutaia 18/25 (72%)	Stats	Kristen Hughes 24/32 (75%); Natalie Medhurst 18/21 (86%)	Umpires: Bobbi Brown; Mandy Nottingham; Reserve umpire: Bronwyn Meek

Monday 7 April	New South Wales Swifts	53–42	Southern Steel	Acer Arena
7:00 pm	Catherine Cox 28/39 (72%); Susan Pratley 25/28 (89%)	Report; Stats	Daneka Wipiiti 34/44 (77%); Megan Dehn 7/12 (58%); Julianna Naoupu 1/1 (100%)	Umpires: Sharon Kelly; Jacqui Jashari; Reserve umpire: Collette Brennan

=== Round 2 ===
Saturday 12 April	Canterbury Tactix	50–44	New South Wales Swifts	Westpac Arena
2:30 pm	Jodi Brown 35/41 (85%); Anna Thompson 15/20 (75%)	Report; Stats	Catherine Cox 26/37 (70%); Susan Pratley 18/24 (75%)	Umpires: Mandy Nottingham; Pauline Sciascia; Reserve umpire: David Pala'amo

Sunday 13 April	Melbourne Vixens	62–52	Queensland Firebirds	State Netball Hockey Centre
1:30 pm	Sharelle McMahon 22/25 (88%); Caitlin Thwaites 39/48 (81%); Ashlee Howard 1/1 (100%)	Report; Stats	Romelda Aiken 40/45 (89%); Janelle Lawson 12/19 (63%)	Umpires: Kate Wright; Pauline Francisco

Sunday 13 April	Waikato Bay of Plenty Magic	56–52	Northern Mystics	Energy Events Centre
5:30 pm	Irene van Dyk 31/38 (82%); Maria Tutaia 25/31 (81%)	Stats	Cathrine Latu 29/34 (85%); Jade Topia 23/26 (88%)	Umpires: Bobbi Brown; Bronwyn Meek; Reserve umpire: Pauline Sciascia

Monday 14 April	Central Pulse	50–52	Southern Steel	TSB Bank Arena
7:00 pm	Jamilah Gupwell 24/31 (77%); Amber Bellringer 26/35 (74%)	Report; Stats	Daneka Wipiiti 23/37 (62%); Megan Dehn 16/22 (73%); Julianna Naoupu 13/15 (87%)	Umpires: Jonathon Bredin; David Pala'amo; Reserve umpire: Mandy Nottingham

Monday 14 April	West Coast Fever	41–54	Adelaide Thunderbirds	Challenge Stadium
6:00 pm	Caitlin Bassett 32/33 (97%); Nikala Smith 8/16 (50%); Tracey Pemberton 1/3 (33%)	Report; Stats	Kristen Hughes 25/32 (78%); Natalie Medhurst 29/30 (97%)	Umpires: Sharon Kelly; Jacqui Jashari

=== Round 3 ===
Saturday 19 April	Northern Mystics	45–49	West Coast Fever	Trusts Stadium
2:30 pm	Cathrine Latu 34/42 (81%); Jade Topia 6/10 (60%); Paula Griffin 5/8 (63%)	Stats	Caitlin Bassett 15/15 (100%); Nikala Smith 7/12 (58%); Bianca Franklin 27/30 (90%)	Umpires: Mandy Nottingham; David Pala'amo; Reserve umpire: Bronwyn Meek

Saturday 19 April	New South Wales Swifts	50–47	Waikato Bay of Plenty Magic	Newcastle Entertainment Centre
2:30 pm	Catherine Cox 31/38 (82%); Susan Pratley 19/22 (86%)	Report; Stats	Irene van Dyk 29/32 (91%); Maria Tutaia 18/23 (78%)	Umpires: Sharon Kelly; Helen George; Reserve umpire: Collette Brennan

Sunday 20 April	Melbourne Vixens	38–39	Adelaide Thunderbirds	Vodafone Arena
1:30 pm	Sharelle McMahon ? Caitlin Thwaites ?	Report; Stats	Kristen Hughes ? Natalie Medhurst 22/23 (96%)

Monday 21 April	Canterbury Tactix	42–51	Southern Steel	Westpac Arena
7:00 pm	Jodi Brown 30/36 (83%); Anna Thompson 8/13 (62%); Hayley Stockman 4/7 (57%)	Report; Stats	Daneka Wipiiti 38/51 (75%); Megan Dehn 13/16 (81%)	Attendance: 5000; Umpires: Bronwyn Meek; Pauline Sciascia; Reserve umpire: Mandy Nottingham

Monday 21 April	Queensland Firebirds	56–28	Central Pulse	Brisbane Convention & Exhibition Centre
7:00 pm	Romelda Aiken 24/25 (96%); Janelle Lawson 10/10 (100%); Joanne Morgan 18/25 (72%); Tamsin Greenway 4/7 (57%)	Report; Stats	Susan Tagicakibau 8/10 (80%); Jamilah Gupwell 16/23 (70%); Amber Bellringer 4/8 (50%)	Umpires: Collette Brennan; Pauline Francisco; Reserve umpire: Dianne Cocker

=== Round 4 ===
Saturday 26 April	Waikato Bay of Plenty Magic	61–47	West Coast Fever	Mystery Creek Events Centre
2:30 pm	Irene van Dyk 35/37 (95%); Maria Tutaia 26/33 (79%)	Report; Stats	Caitlin Bassett 35/38 (92%); Nikala Smith 4/5 (80%); Bianca Franklin 8/10 (80%)	Umpires: Bronwyn Meek; Mandy Nottingham; Reserve umpire: Pauline Sciascia

Saturday 26 April	Queensland Firebirds	46–40	Northern Mystics	Brisbane Convention & Exhibition Centre
2:30 pm	Romelda Aiken 27/33 (82%); Janelle Lawson 15/18 (83%); Joanne Morgan 4/6 (67%)	Report; Stats	Cathrine Latu 15/16 (94%); Jade Topia 7/9 (78%); Paula Griffin 18/25 (72%)	Umpires: Collette Brennan; Sue Floro; Reserve umpire: Dianne Cocker

Sunday 27 April	Adelaide Thunderbirds	54–41	Southern Steel	ETSA Park
1:00 pm	Kristen Hughes 18/20 (90%); Natalie Medhurst 18/21 (86%); Kate Beveridge 18/21 (86%)	Report; Stats	Daneka Wipiiti 33/46 (72%); Megan Dehn 8/10 (80%)	Umpires: Jacqui Jashari; Raechel Richards; Reserve umpire: Pauline Francisco

Monday 28 April	Canterbury Tactix	50–58	Melbourne Vixens	Westpac Arena
7:00 pm	Jodi Brown 36/38 (95%); Anna Thompson 14/17 (82%)	Report; Stats	Sharelle McMahon 18/21 (86%); Caitlin Thwaites 40/52 (77%)	Umpires: Alison Cormack; David Pala'amo; Reserve umpire: Mandy Nottingham

Monday 28 April	New South Wales Swifts	59–30	Central Pulse	Sydney Olympic Park Sports Centre
7:00 pm	Catherine Cox 36/43 (84%); Susan Pratley 15/17 (88%); Leah Shoard 8/12 (67%)	Report; Stats	Susan Tagicakibau 19/23 (83%); Jamilah Gupwell 3/5 (60%); Amber Bellringer 8/14 (57%)	Umpires: Sharon Kelly; Rachael Ayre; Reserve umpire: Helen George

=== Round 5 ===
Saturday 3 May	Waikato Bay of Plenty Magic	54–37	Central Pulse	Mystery Creek Events Centre
2:30 pm	Irene van Dyk 40/41 (98%); Maria Tutaia 11/15 (73%); Halana Leith 3/4 (75%)	Report; Stats	Susan Tagicakibau 18/20 (90%); Amber Bellringer 19/27 (70%)	Umpires: Jonathon Bredin; Pauline Sciascia; Reserve umpire: Bronwyn Meek

Saturday 3 May	West Coast Fever	46–65	Queensland Firebirds	Challenge Stadium
12:30 pm	Caitlin Bassett 39/49 (80%); Nikala Smith 4/7 (57%); Bianca Franklin 3/6 (50%)	Report; Stats	Romelda Aiken 48/54 (89%); Janelle Lawson 11/17 (65%); Tamsin Greenway 6/9 (67%)

Monday 5 May	Southern Steel	48–50	Northern Mystics	Stadium Southland
7:00 pm	Daneka Wipiiti 32/45 (71%); Megan Dehn 16/20 (80%)	Stats	Cathrine Latu 31/34 (91%); Jade Topia 19/29 (66%)	Umpires: Bobbi Brown; Alison Cormack; Reserve umpire: Jonathon Bredin

Monday 5 May	New South Wales Swifts	52–53	Melbourne Vixens	Newcastle Entertainment Centre
7:00 pm	Catherine Cox 36/42 (86%); Susan Pratley 16/20 (80%)	Stats	Sharelle McMahon 21/24 (88%); Caitlin Thwaites 32/42 (76%)

BYES: Adelaide Thunderbirds and Canterbury Tactix

=== Round 6 ===
Saturday 10 May	Southern Steel	48–51	Canterbury Tactix	Stadium Southland
2:30 pm	Daneka Wipiiti 31/39 (79%); Megan Dehn 17/22 (77%)	Report; Stats	Jodi Brown 40/46 (87%); Anna Thompson 11/18 (61%)

Saturday 10 May	Queensland Firebirds	66–52	New South Wales Swifts	Brisbane Convention & Exhibition Centre
2:30 pm	Romelda Aiken 58/60 (97%); Tamsin Greenway 8/9 (89%)	Report; Stats	Catherine Cox 28/31 (90%); Susan Pratley 24/31 (77%)

Monday 12 May	Northern Mystics	45–59	Waikato Bay of Plenty Magic	Trusts Stadium
7:00 pm	Cathrine Latu 30/34 (88%); Jade Topia 15/23 (65%)	Report; Stats	Irene van Dyk 36/39 (92%); Maria Tutaia 23/29 (79%)

Monday 12 May	Adelaide Thunderbirds	66–50	West Coast Fever	ETSA Park
6:30 pm	Kristen Hughes 24/28 (86%); Natalie Medhurst 34/36 (94%); Kate Beveridge 8/11 (73%)	Report; Stats	Caitlin Bassett 36/42 (86%); Nikala Smith 6/11 (55%); Bianca Franklin 8/9 (89%)

BYES: Melbourne Vixens and Central Pulse

=== Round 7 ===
Saturday 17 May	Central Pulse	50–55	Canterbury Tactix	Arena Manawatu
2:30 pm	Susan Tagicakibau 7/10 (70%); Jamilah Gupwell 25/33 (76%); Amber Bellringer 18/26 (69%)	Stats	Rachel Dunn 37/43 (86%); Anna Thompson 18/26 (69%)

Sunday 18 May	Adelaide Thunderbirds	46–52	Melbourne Vixens	ETSA Park
1:00 pm	Kristen Hughes 7/11 (64%); Natalie Medhurst 29/33 (88%); Kate Beveridge 10/14 (71%)	Report; Stats	Sharelle McMahon 23/31 (74%); Caitlin Thwaites 29/35 (83%)	Umpires: Jacqui Jashari; Annie Kloppers; Reserve umpire: Raechel Richards

Monday 19 May	Waikato Bay of Plenty Magic	56–47	Southern Steel	Mystery Creek Events Centre
7:00 pm	Irene van Dyk 33/33 (100%); Maria Tutaia 23/26 (88%)	Stats	Daneka Wipiiti 34/35 (97%); Megan Dehn 13/16 (81%)

Monday 19 May	New South Wales Swifts	66–54	West Coast Fever	Sydney Olympic Park Sports Centre
7:00 pm	Catherine Cox 32/43 (74%); Susan Pratley 34/37 (92%)	Stats	Caitlin Bassett 49/54 (91%); Nikala Smith 4/5 (80%); Bianca Franklin 1/1 (100%)	Umpires: Sharon Kelly; Annie Kloppers; Reserve umpire: Collette Brennan

BYES: Queensland Firebirds and Northern Mystics

=== Round 8 ===
Saturday 24 May	Canterbury Tactix	50–54	Waikato Bay of Plenty Magic	Westpac Arena
2:30 pm	Rachel Dunn 35/41 (85%); Anna Thompson 15/19 (79%)	Report; Stats	Irene van Dyk 32/33 (97%); Maria Tutaia 22/29 (76%)

Sunday 25 May	Queensland Firebirds	60–51	Melbourne Vixens	Brisbane Convention & Exhibition Centre
1:30 pm	Romelda Aiken 53/58 (91%); Tamsin Greenway 7/13 (54%)	Report; Stats	Sharelle McMahon 19/21 (90%); Caitlin Thwaites 32/38 (84%)	Umpires: Sharon Kelly; Rachael Ayre; Reserve umpire: Dianne Cocker

Monday 26 May	Central Pulse	48–54	Northern Mystics	TSB Bank Arena
7:00 pm	Susan Tagicakibau 29/34 (85%); Jamilah Gupwell 19/24 (79%)	Report; Stats	Cathrine Latu 10/10 (100%); Jade Topia 16/18 (89%); Paula Griffin 28/34 (82%)

Monday 26 May	Adelaide Thunderbirds	44–50	New South Wales Swifts	ETSA Park
6:30 pm	Natalie Medhurst 15/17 (88%); Kate Beveridge 29/32 (91%)	Report; Stats	Catherine Cox 34/39 (87%); Susan Pratley 16/18 (89%)	Umpires: Jacqui Jashari; Collette Brennan; Reserve umpire: Pauline Francisco

BYES: West Coast Fever and Southern Steel

=== Round 9 ===
Saturday 31 May	Southern Steel	41–29	Central Pulse	Stadium Southland
2:30 pm	Daneka Wipiiti 21/28 (75%); Megan Dehn 16/22 (73%); Jess Tuki 4/5 (80%)	Report; Stats	Susan Tagicakibau 11/15 (73%); Jamilah Gupwell 15/20 (75%); Amber Bellringer 3/6 (50%)

Sunday 1 June	Melbourne Vixens	57–44	West Coast Fever	State Netball Hockey Centre
1:30 pm	Sharelle McMahon 24/32 (75%); Caitlin Thwaites 23/31 (74%); Abby Sargent 9/12 (75%); Ashlee Howard 1/4 (25%)	Report; Stats	Caitlin Bassett 35/37 (95%); Nikala Smith 5/6 (83%); Bianca Franklin 4/5 (80%)	Umpires: Raechel Richards; Pauline Francisco; Reserve umpire: Kate Wright

Monday 2 June	Northern Mystics	50–46	Canterbury Tactix	Trusts Stadium
7:00 pm	Cathrine Latu 16/16 (100%); Jade Topia 12/18 (67%); Paula Griffin 22/25 (88%)	Report; Stats	Rachel Dunn 15/18 (83%); Anna Thompson 24/30 (80%); Ellen Halpenny 7/9 (78%)

Monday 2 June	Queensland Firebirds	41–47	Adelaide Thunderbirds	Brisbane Convention & Exhibition Centre
7:00 pm	Romelda Aiken 32/39 (82%); Janelle Lawson 5/11 (45%); Tamsin Greenway 4/7 (57%)	Report; Stats	Natalie Medhurst 18/19 (95%); Kate Beveridge 29/34 (85%)	Umpires: Sharon Kelly; Collette Brennan; Reserve umpire: Dianne Cocker

BYES: New South Wales Swifts and Waikato Bay of Plenty Magic

=== Round 10 ===
Saturday 7 June	Southern Steel	47–46	Melbourne Vixens	Stadium Southland
2:30 pm	Daneka Wipiiti 21/31 (68%); Julianna Naoupu 26/32 (81%)	Report; Stats	Sharelle McMahon 18/22 (82%); Caitlin Thwaites 28/38 (74%)

Sunday 8 June	Adelaide Thunderbirds	61–41	Canterbury Tactix	ETSA Park
1:00 pm	Kate Beveridge 39/43 (91%); Natalie Medhurst 22/26 (85%)	Report; Stats	Rachel Dunn 27/32 (84%); Anna Thompson 14/16 (88%)	Umpires: Pauline Francisco; Raechel Richards; Reserve umpire: Dusty Rea

Sunday 8 June	Waikato Bay of Plenty Magic	56–50	Queensland Firebirds	Energy Events Centre
5:30 pm	Irene van Dyk 40/48 (83%); Maria Tutaia 16/21 (76%)	Report; Stats	Romelda Aiken 39/46 (85%); Janelle Lawson 1/3 (33%); Tamsin Greenway 10/14 (71%)

Monday 9 June	Northern Mystics	62–64	New South Wales Swifts	Trusts Stadium
7:00 pm	Catherine Latu 48/52 (92%); Grace Rasmussen 14/19 (74%)	Report; Stats	Catherine Cox 35/39 (90%); Susan Pratley 28/28 (100%)	Umpires: Bronwyn Meek; Mandy Nottingham; Reserve umpire: Jonathon Bredin

Monday 9 June	West Coast Fever	33–16 ^{(Note 3)}	Central Pulse	Challenge Stadium
6:00 pm	Caitlin Bassett 20/24 (83%); Bianca Franklin 13/14 (93%)	Report; Stats	Susan Tagicakibau 4/8 (50%); Jamilah Gupwell 11/12 (92%); Amber Bellringer 1/2 (50%)	Umpires: Kate Wright; Jacqui Jashari; Reserve umpire: Tammy Howard

=== Round 11 ===
Saturday 14 June	Northern Mystics	47–48	Adelaide Thunderbirds	Trusts Stadium
2:30 pm	Catherine Latu 31/33 (94%); Grace Rasmussen 11/18 (61%); Jade Topia 5/7 (71%)	Report; Stats	Kate Beveridge 20/25 (80%); Natalie Medhurst 28/32 (88%)	Umpires: Bobbi Brown; David Pala'amo; Reserve umpire: Liz Boon

Sunday 15 June	New South Wales Swifts	61–60	Queensland Firebirds	Sydney Olympic Park Sports Centre
1:30 pm	Catherine Cox 32/36 (89%); Susan Pratley 29/33 (88%)	Report; Stats	Romelda Aiken 53/56 (95%); Tamsin Greenway 3/4 (75%); Sophie Croft 4/6 (67%)	Umpires: Jacqui Jashari; Kate Wright; Reserve umpire: Collette Brennan

Sunday 15 June	Canterbury Tactix	50–49	Central Pulse	Westpac Arena
5:30 pm	Rachel Dunn 27/34 (79%); Anna Thompson 17/26 (65%); Ellen Halpenny 6/11 (55%)	Report; Stats	Susan Tagicakibau 23/28 (82%); Jamilah Gupwell 22/31 (71%); Amber Bellringer 4/8 (50%)	Umpires: Alison Cormack; Pauline Sciascia; Reserve umpire: Mandy Nottingham

Monday 16 June	Southern Steel	58–43	West Coast Fever	Edgar Centre
7:00 pm	Daneka Wipiiti 41/46 (89%); Julianna Naoupu 17/26 (65%)	Report; Stats	Caitlin Bassett 29/38 (76%); Bianca Franklin 8/12 (67%); Nikala Smith 6/7 (86%)	Umpires: Jonathon Bredin; Mandy Nottingham; Reserve umpire: Bobbi Brown

Monday 16 June	Melbourne Vixens	47–40	Waikato Bay of Plenty Magic	State Netball Hockey Centre
7:00 pm	Sharelle McMahon 26/31 (84%); Caitlin Thwaites 9/15 (60%); Abby Sargent 12/19 (63%)	Report; Stats	Irene van Dyk 25/28 (89%); Maria Tutaia 15/25 (60%)	Umpires: Sharon Kelly; Rachael Ayre; Reserve umpire: Kate Wright

=== Round 12 ===
Saturday 21 June	Central Pulse	41–46	Waikato Bay of Plenty Magic	TSB Bank Arena
2:30 pm	Susan Tagicakibau 26/32 (81%); Jamilah Gupwell 15/18 (83%)	Report; Stats	Irene van Dyk 35/36 (97%); Maria Tutaia 11/14 (79%)	Umpires: Alison Cormack; David Pala'amo; Reserve umpire: Pauline Sciascia

Saturday 21 June	West Coast Fever	48–54	Melbourne Vixens	Challenge Stadium
12:30 pm	Caitlin Bassett 39/43 (91%); Nikala Smith 9/10 (90%)	Report; Stats	Sharelle McMahon 19/22 (86%); Caitlin Thwaites 32/40 (80%); Abby Sargent 3/4 (75%)	Umpires: Jacqui Jashari; Raechel Richards; Reserve umpire: Tammy Howard

Sunday 22 June	Queensland Firebirds	50–36	Canterbury Tactix	Brisbane Convention & Exhibition Centre
1:30 pm	Romelda Aiken 16/17 (94%); Janelle Lawson 7/9 (78%); Joanne Morgan 21/22 (95%); Tamsin Greenway 6/10 (60%)	Report; Stats	Rachel Dunn 6/7 (86%); Anna Thompson 9/15 (60%); Hayley Stockman 21/24 (88%)	Umpires: Kate Wright; Collette Brennan; Reserve umpire: Dianne Cocker

Monday 23 June	Northern Mystics	47–41	Southern Steel	North Shore Events Centre
7:00 pm	Paula Griffin 29/39 (74%); Jade Topia 18/22 (82%)	Report; Stats	Daneka Wipiiti 24/35 (69%); Julianna Naoupu 12/18 (67%); Megan Dehn 5/8 (63%)	Umpires: Bobbi Brown; Mandy Nottingham; Reserve umpire: Jonathon Bredin

Monday 23 June	New South Wales Swifts	51–41	Adelaide Thunderbirds	Sydney Olympic Park Sports Centre
7:00 pm	Catherine Cox 33/39 (85%); Susan Pratley 18/24 (75%)	Report; Stats	Kate Beveridge 22/26 (85%); Natalie Medhurst 17/18 (94%); Kristen Hughes 2/4 (50%)	Umpires: Sharon Kelly; Pauline Francisco; Reserve umpire: Collette Brennan

=== Round 13 ===
Saturday 28 June	Northern Mystics	42–28	Central Pulse	North Shore Events Centre
2:30 pm	Paula Griffin 22/31 (71%); Catherine Latu 11/13 (85%); Jade Topia 9/10 (90%)	Report; Stats	Susan Tagicakibau 5/10 (50%); Jamilah Gupwell 14/20 (70%); Amber Bellringer 9/16 (56%)	Umpires: Bobbi Brown; David Pala'amo; Reserve umpire: Bronwyn Meek

Saturday 28 June	Adelaide Thunderbirds	66–47	Queensland Firebirds	ETSA Park
2:00 pm	Kate Beveridge 37/40 (93%); Natalie Medhurst 29/31 (94%)	Report; Stats	Romelda Aiken 35/39 (90%); Janelle Lawson 3/6 (50%); Joanne Morgan 9/11 (82%)	Umpires: Jacqui Jashari; Rachael Ayre; Reserve umpire: Dusty Rea

Sunday 29 June	West Coast Fever	50–44	Canterbury Tactix	Challenge Stadium
11:30 am	Caitlin Bassett 40/48 (83%); Nikala Smith 10/16 (63%)	Report; Stats	Rachel Dunn 11/17 (65%); Anna Thompson 17/24 (71%); Hayley Stockman 16/21 (76%)	Umpires: Pauline Francisco; Collette Brennan; Reserve umpire: Tammy Howard

Monday 30 June	Southern Steel	47–43	Waikato Bay of Plenty Magic	Stadium Southland
7:00 pm	Daneka Wipiiti 30/44 (68%); Julianna Naoupu 6/9 (67%); Megan Dehn 11/12 (92%)	Report; Stats	Irene van Dyk 27/27 (100%); Maria Tutaia 16/24 (67%)	Umpires: Bronwyn Meek; Pauline Sciascia; Reserve umpire: Jonathon Bredin

Monday 30 June	Melbourne Vixens	49–62	New South Wales Swifts	Vodafone Arena
7:00 pm	Sharelle McMahon 16/23 (70%); Caitlin Thwaites 33/38 (87%)	Report; Stats	Catherine Cox 32/41 (78%); Susan Pratley 30/33 (91%)	Umpires: Kate Wright; Sharon Kelly; Reserve umpire: Raechel Richards

=== Round 14 ===
Saturday 5 July	Waikato Bay of Plenty Magic	69–44	Canterbury Tactix	Mystery Creek Events Centre
2:30 pm	Irene van Dyk 33/35 (94%); Maria Tutaia 36/41 (88%)	Report; Stats	Rachel Dunn 24/28 (86%); Anna Thompson 16/22 (73%); Hayley Stockman 4/5 (80%)	Umpires: Bobbi Brown; Bronwyn Meek; Reserve umpire: Pauline Sciascia

Sunday 6 July	Melbourne Vixens	56–47	Northern Mystics	Vodafone Arena
1:30 pm	Sharelle McMahon 17/22 (77%); Caitlin Thwaites 39/48 (81%)	Stats	Paula Griffin 23/34 (68%); Catherine Latu 17/21 (81%); Jade Topia 7/9 (78%)	Umpires: Sharon Kelly; Rachael Ayre; Reserve umpire: Raechel Richards

Sunday 6 July	Southern Steel	54–52	Queensland Firebirds	Edgar Centre
5:30 pm	Daneka Wipiiti 29/41 (71%); Megan Dehn 25/28 (89%)	Report; Stats	Romelda Aiken 35/39 (90%); Janelle Lawson 10/13 (77%); Tamsin Greenway 7/13 (54%)	Umpires: Alison Cormack; Mandy Nottingham; Reserve umpire: Jonathon Bredin

Monday 7 July	Central Pulse	32–44	Adelaide Thunderbirds	Pettigrew Green Arena
7:00 pm	Susan Tagicakibau 12/16 (75%); Jamilah Gupwell 13/20 (65%); Amber Bellringer 7/8 (88%)	Report; Stats	Kate Beveridge 27/32 (84%); Natalie Medhurst 12/13 (92%); Melissa Rowland 5/7 (71%)	Umpires: Jonathon Bredin; Pauline Sciascia; Reserve umpire: Bronwyn Meek

Monday 7 July	West Coast Fever	54–63	New South Wales Swifts	Challenge Stadium
6:00 pm	Caitlin Bassett 46/54 (85%); Nikala Smith 8/9 (89%)	Report; Stats	Catherine Cox 34/45 (76%); Susan Pratley 29/34 (85%)	Umpires: Jacqui Jashari; Kate Wright; Reserve umpire: Tammy Howard

== Final table ==
2008 ANZ Championship season
	Team	Pld	W	D	L	GF	GA	G%	Pts
1	Waikato Bay of Plenty Magic	13	10	0	3	687	599	114.69	20
2	New South Wales Swifts	13	10	0	3	727	652	111.50	20
3	Adelaide Thunderbirds	13	9	0	4	652	577	113.00	18
4	Melbourne Vixens	13	9	0	4	673	620	108.55	18
5	Queensland Firebirds	13	7	0	6	693	645	107.44	14
6	Southern Steel	13	7	0	6	617	616	100.16	14
7	Northern Mystics	13	5	0	8	625	637	98.12	10
8	Canterbury Tactix	13	5	0	8	607	678	89.53	10
9	West Coast Fever ^{(Note 3)}	13	2	1	10	605	697	86.80	5
10	Central Pulse ^{(Note 3)}	13	0	1	12	471	636	74.06	1
Updated: 17 February 2021

Qualified for Major semi-final
Qualified for Minor semi-final

- Pld = Games played
- W = Win (2 points)
- D = Draw (1 point)
- L = Loss (0 points)
- GF = Goals For (Total goals scored)
- GA = Goals Against (Total goals conceded)
- G% = Goal percentage (= 100 × GF/GA)
- Pts = Points

Notes

- ^3 The Round 10 match between West Coast Fever and Central Pulse was called off due to a stadium leak. The match was declared a draw, with each team receiving one point. Fever were leading 33–16 when the match was called off. The goals scored by each team were included in the final table.

== Playoffs ==
Semifinals
13 July
Waikato Bay of Plenty Magic	56
New South Wales Swifts	57
14 July
Adelaide Thunderbirds	53
Melbourne Vixens	48

Preliminary final
21 July
Waikato Bay of Plenty Magic	51
Adelaide Thunderbirds	49

Grand final
28 July
New South Wales Swifts	65
Waikato Bay of Plenty Magic	56

=== Major semi-final ===
Sunday 13 July; 17:30 (UTC+12)	Stats	Waikato Bay of Plenty Magic	56–57	New South Wales Swifts	Mystery Creek Events Centre; Umpires: Jacqui Jashari; Bronwyn Meek; Reserve umpire: Mandy Nottingham	FOXSports; SKYSport
Sunday 13 July; 17:30 (UTC+12)	Stats	Scoring by quarter: 15-16, 17-14, 9-17, 15-10			Mystery Creek Events Centre; Umpires: Jacqui Jashari; Bronwyn Meek; Reserve umpire: Mandy Nottingham	FOXSports; SKYSport
Sunday 13 July; 17:30 (UTC+12)	Stats	Irene van Dyk 29/29 (100%); Maria Tutaia 27/34 (79%)		Catherine Cox 41/48 (85%); Susan Pratley 16/19 (84%)	Mystery Creek Events Centre; Umpires: Jacqui Jashari; Bronwyn Meek; Reserve umpire: Mandy Nottingham	FOXSports; SKYSport

=== Minor semi-final ===
Monday 14 July; 16:30 (UTC+9:30)	Stats	Adelaide Thunderbirds	53–48	Melbourne Vixens	ETSA Park; Umpires: Rachael Ayre; Bobbi Brown; Reserve umpire: Helen George	FOXSports; SKYSport
Monday 14 July; 16:30 (UTC+9:30)	Stats	Scoring by quarter: 8–16, 16–8, 12–14, 17–10			ETSA Park; Umpires: Rachael Ayre; Bobbi Brown; Reserve umpire: Helen George	FOXSports; SKYSport
Monday 14 July; 16:30 (UTC+9:30)	Stats	Kate Beveridge 38/44 (86%); Natalie Medhurst 15/20 (75%)		Caitlin Thwaites 28/37 (76%); Sharelle McMahon 20/21 (95%)	ETSA Park; Umpires: Rachael Ayre; Bobbi Brown; Reserve umpire: Helen George	FOXSports; SKYSport

=== Preliminary final ===
Monday 21 July; 19:00 (UTC+12)	Stats	Waikato Bay of Plenty Magic	51–49	Adelaide Thunderbirds	Mystery Creek Events Centre; Umpires: Sharon Kelly; Bronwyn Meek; Reserve umpire: Bobbi Brown	FOXSports; SKYSport
Monday 21 July; 19:00 (UTC+12)	Stats	Scoring by quarter: 17–14, 12–11, 12–11, 10–13			Mystery Creek Events Centre; Umpires: Sharon Kelly; Bronwyn Meek; Reserve umpire: Bobbi Brown	FOXSports; SKYSport
Monday 21 July; 19:00 (UTC+12)	Stats	Irene van Dyk 31/32 (97%); Maria Tutaia 20/23 (87%)		Kate Beveridge 29/34 (85%); Natalie Medhurst 20/22 (91%)	Mystery Creek Events Centre; Umpires: Sharon Kelly; Bronwyn Meek; Reserve umpire: Bobbi Brown	FOXSports; SKYSport

=== Grand final ===
Monday 28 July; 19:00 (UTC+10)	Stats	New South Wales Swifts	65–56	Waikato Bay of Plenty Magic	Acer Arena; Attendance: 12,999; Umpires: Sharon Kelly; Bronwyn Meek; Reserve umpire: Jacqui Jashari	FOXSports; SKYSport
Monday 28 July; 19:00 (UTC+10)	Stats	Scoring by quarter: 19-14, 15-14, 16-17, 15-11			Acer Arena; Attendance: 12,999; Umpires: Sharon Kelly; Bronwyn Meek; Reserve umpire: Jacqui Jashari	FOXSports; SKYSport
Monday 28 July; 19:00 (UTC+10)	Stats	Catherine Cox 41/46 (89%); Susan Pratley 24/30 (80%)		Irene van Dyk 45/46 (98%); Maria Tutaia 11/15 (73%)	Acer Arena; Attendance: 12,999; Umpires: Sharon Kelly; Bronwyn Meek; Reserve umpire: Jacqui Jashari	FOXSports; SKYSport

== Award winners ==
=== ANZ Championship awards ===
Award	Winner	Team
Most Valuable Player	(Jamaica) Romelda Aiken ^{(Note 2)}	Queensland Firebirds
Most Valuable Player	(England) Sonia Mkoloma ^{(Note 2)}	Central Pulse
Grand Final MVP	(Australia) Catherine Cox	New South Wales Swifts

Notes

- ^2 Romelda Aiken and Sonia Mkoloma shared the MVP Award

=== Australian Netball Awards ===
Award	Winner	Team
Liz Ellis Diamond	(Australia) Mo'onia Gerrard	Adelaide Thunderbirds
Australian ANZ Championship Player of the Year	(Australia) Catherine Cox	New South Wales Swifts
Australian ANZ Championship Coach of the Year	(Australia) Julie Fitzgerald	New South Wales Swifts
