= Tagicakibau =

Tagicakibau is a surname. Notable people with the surname include:

- Two brothers:
  - Michael Tagicakibau (born 1985), Fijian rugby union wing and coach
  - Sailosi Tagicakibau (born 1982), Fijian rugby union wing
- Susan Tagicakibau (born 1988), Fijian netball player
