= Rachel Beale =

New Zealand netball player

Personal information
- Born: 9 July 1983 (age 43) Gisborne, New Zealand
- Height: 1.85 m (6 ft 1 in)
- School: Gisborne Girls High school

Netball career
- Playing positions: GD, GK
Years	Club team	Apps
2008	Waikato Bay of Plenty Magic	
2009–10	Leeds Carnegie	
- Updated on 21 March 2010

Rachel Beale (born 9 July 1983 in Gisborne, New Zealand) is a New Zealand netball player. Beale played with the Waikato Bay of Plenty Magic for the 2008 ANZ Championship season. She was not signed for the 2009 season, but later that year Beale accepted an offer from Leeds Carnegie to play in the 2009–10 Netball Superleague. Rachel has also represented New Zealand in Kayaking and Surf Life Saving, adding many national and international medals to her belt.
