= New Zealand Scout Jamboree =

Regular series of scout jamborees in New Zealand

24th New Zealand Scout Jamboree
- Theme: Together - Kotahitanga
- Location: Mystery Creek Events Centre, Hamilton, New Zealand
- Country: New Zealand
- Date: 28 December 2026 – 7 January 2027
- Website www.nzjamboree.org

The New Zealand Scout Jamboree is a Jamboree which is held every three years by Scouts New Zealand. The Jamboree is traditionally held in summer between late December and early January, with a significant New Years party. The 23rd New Zealand Scout Jamboree was held at Mystery Creek Events Centre, Hamilton in the North Island from 30 December 2023 to 7 January 2024.

== History ==
The first NZ Scout jamboree was held in Dunedin in 1926. In recent years Jamborees have been held every three years.

The list supplied from Paul van Herpt, National Scout Museum Adviser, is as follows

1. 1926 - Dominion Jamboree Dunedin
2. 1959 - Pan Pacific Jamboree Cornwall Park, Auckland
3. 1962 - First class Jamboree, Waiora, Dunedin
4. 1966 - Progress Jamboree, Trentham, Wellington
5. 1969 - National Jamboree, Blue Skies, Kaiapoi
6. 1972 - National Jamboree, Pukekohe, Auckland
7. 1975 - National Jamboree, Tokoroa
8. 1978 - 8th NZ Jamboree, Oamaru, 3rd Asia Pacific
9. 1981 - NZ Jamboree, Venture, Regatta, Hawkes Bay
10. 1984 - Feilding
11. 1987 - Rangiora
12. 1990 - 12th New Zealand, 11th Asia Pacific, Mystery Creek, Hamilton
13. 1993 - Upper Hutt
14. 1996 - Te Anau
15. 1999 - Greytown
16. 2001/02 - Hamilton
17. 2004/05 - Feilding
18. 2007/08 - C-JAM, Christchurch
19. 2010/11 - Adventure Jam 2011, Mystery Creek, Hamilton
20. 2013/14 - NZ20, Manfeild Park, Feilding
21. 2016/17 - Renwick Domain, Marlborough
22. 2019/20 - Mystery Creek, Hamilton
23. 2023/24 - Mystery Creek, Hamilton
24. 2026/27 - Mystery Creek, Hamilton

Note: The 1939 Jamboree was cancelled due to the outbreak of World War II. Details below

- 1939 - International Jamboree, Heretaunga, near Wellington

Before the update, the list included a reference to a Jamboree in 1942, as labelled on the www.teara.govt.nz website; it was in fact a rally, of which there were many.

- 1942 - Scout Rally in Wellington

== 22nd New Zealand Scout Jamboree ==
22nd New Zealand Scout Jamboree
- Official Logo
- Location: Mystery Creek Events Centre, Hamilton, New Zealand
- Country: New Zealand
- Date: 30 December 2019 - 7 January 2020
- Attendance: 4000
- Website jamboree.org.nz

The 22nd New Zealand Scout Jamboree was held at Mystery Creek Events Centre, Hamilton in the North Island. It ran from 28 December 2019 to 7 January 2020 This Jamboree, unlike earlier ones, has 1 central command centre (known as the hub), with 4 villages surrounding. Villages used to be known as subcamps. Within these villages, there will be a "Village Green" - A central area to meet with other scouts, trade badges and more. The Jamboree hub is located at the central pavilion. At the hub, you can pay for gas, retrieve birthday cakes, purchase ice, or locate lost items. There is also a charging space and a merchandise shop present. Villages were named after lakes which connect with Mystery Creek. These are Maraetai, Arapuni, Waipapa and Ohakuri.

This Jamboree also changed the patrol system to the "Teams system". Each team consists of a Team Leader, Assistant Team Leader, and team members. There are 6 teams in a troop, similar to previous Jamborees, with 6 patrols to a troop. Each night at Jamboree, each troop has a Team Leader's Council, where each Team Leader decides what they want their Team to do the next day. The Duty Team Leader attends the Jamboree Team Council, with all other Duty Team Leaders that day. This has been promoted due to the new Scouts NZ policy, "Youth leading, Adults Supporting".

Some programme activity themes included; Survival; Water; Challenge; Adventure; Lake Karapiro (Overnight base).

== 21st New Zealand Scout Jamboree ==
21st New Zealand Scout Jamboree
- Location: Giesen Sports & Events Center, Renwick, New Zealand
- Country: New Zealand
- Date: 29 December 2016 to 7 January 2017
- Website jamboree.org.nz

The 21st New Zealand Scout Jamboree was held at Renwick Domain, Marlborough in the South Island from 29 December 2016 to 7 January 2017. Giesen Park in Renwick will host the main camp site with four other activity hubs in Picton, Blenheim, Omaka and in Pine Valley. As in almost all Jamborees, the event is divided into a number of sub-camps and attending Scout troops are allocated to a specific sub-camp. Each sub-camp has its own administration and support, provided by volunteers. The event has been welcomed locally with the 4500 participants expected to bring an economic boost to the area. Special transport arrangements have been put in place to get all the Scouts and supporters to and from the site.

=== Staff ===
Jamborees provide opportunities for both adults and young people to work as volunteer members of staff (often called the "support team" to provide a number of services to the Jamboree. Staff members arrive a number of days before the jamboree begins and usually depart on the same day or a few days later to set up the site so that it is ready for the scouts to arrive on opening day.

=== Youth Staff Team ===
The Youth Staff team (YST) comprises approximately 150 people, aged from Year 12 (in 2016) to 26 years old. These volunteers come from Venturer groups all over the country, and some may be from overseas. YST’s role is to give service and a chance to give back to Scouting.

== 20th New Zealand Scout Jamboree ==
20th New Zealand Scout Jamboree
- Official logo
- Theme: Patrol Empowerment
- Location: Manfeild Park, Feilding
- Country: New Zealand
- Date: 28 December 2013 to 6 January 2014
- Attendance: 3,000 Scouts

The 20th New Zealand Scout Jamboree (also known as NZ20 or MPWR) was held at Manfeild Park, Feilding, New Zealand between 28 December 2013 and 6 January 2014.

Manfeild Park, near Feilding, was the main venue for the Jamboree. Some activities were held outside Feilding - for example, the caving base was held on a farm north of Pohangina, near Ashhurst. On the final day of activities, the full-day water-based "Water'M" activity was cancelled and the Scouts scheduled to attend were taken to the Lido Aquatic Centre in Palmerston North for the afternoon.

The 20th New Zealand Scout Jamboree was attended by over 3,000 Scouts and Leaders from New Zealand, Australia, Samoa, the Cook Islands, Indonesia, South Korea, and several other countries.

The theme of NZ20 was 'MPWR' - the empowerment of patrols to be independent and responsible scouts at the Jamboree.

The patrol leaders were given more responsibility than at the previous Jamboree and had to manage their own timetable and their patrol without an adult leader with them.

The Jamboree was split into three sub camps: MBLZN (yellow), MBRK (blue) and MBLDN (red). Each subcamp had a subcamp office that was responsible for running the subcamp.

On 1 January 2014 the Jamboree set a Guinness World Record for the most people wearing paper hats at a single venue (3054, breaking the previous record of 1155).

== 19th New Zealand Scout Jamboree ==
19th New Zealand Scout Jamboree
- Location: Mystery Creek Events Centre, Hamilton, New Zealand
- Country: New Zealand
- Date: 29 December 2010 to 6 January 2011
- Attendance: 4,000 Scouts
- Website www.facebook.com/19thNZScoutJamboree

The 19th New Zealand Scout Jamboree (known as Adventure Jam 2011) was held at Mystery Creek Events Centre, Hamilton, New Zealand between 29 December 2010 and 6 January 2011. Mystery Creek Events Centre, near Hamilton, was the main venue for the Jamboree. Some activities were held outside Mystery Creek.

Adventure Jam 2011 was attended by over 4,000 Scouts from all over New Zealand, Australia, Samoa, the Cook Islands, New Caledonia and other countries.

The camps were split into 3 subcamps: Xtreme (red), Xcite (blue) and Xplore (green).

FuseAir 107.6 FM was the Jamboree's official radio station.

== The 18th New Zealand Scout Jamboree ==
The 18th New Zealand Scout Jamboree (known as C-JAM) was held in Christchurch, New Zealand, between December 2007 and January 2008.
