= Keshia Grant =

New Zealand netball player (born 1987)

Personal information
- Born: 11 January 1987 (age 39) Tauranga, New Zealand
- Height: 1.64 m (5 ft 5 in)
- University: Waikato University

Netball career
- Playing positions: WA, C
Years	Club team	Apps
2008	Waikato Bay of Plenty Magic	
2009–2011	Northern Mystics	
2012–2015	Mainland Tactix	
2016–	Hertfordshire Mavericks	
- Updated on 22 March 2010

Keshia Grant (born 11 January 1987 in Tauranga, New Zealand) is a New Zealand netball player.

== Biography ==
Grant played netball in the netball ANZ Championship, for the Waikato Bay of Plenty Magic in 2008, the Northern Mystics from 2009 to 2011, and the Canterbury/Mainland Tactix from 2012 to 2015.

Grant was also a successful javelin thrower in New Zealand winning the event at the New Zealand Athletics Championships in three consecutive years, 2007 to 2009. Grant was ranked second in the New Zealand all-time rankings in 2010 and was still ranked in the top ten in 2019.
