= Brigette Tapene =

New Zealand netball player

Personal information
- Born: 6 February 1985; Auckland
- Height: 178 cm (5 ft 10 in)
- School: Auckland Girls Grammar
- University: AUT

Brigette Tapene (born 1985) is a New Zealand netball player in the ANZ Championship, playing for the Waikato/Bay of Plenty Magic.
