= Jessica Tuki =

New Zealand netball player

Personal information
- Born: 28 October 1987 (age 38) New Plymouth, New Zealand
- Height: 1.85 m (6 ft 1 in)

Netball career
- Playing positions: GS, GA, WA, WD, GD, GK
Years	Club team	Apps
2004–2005	Western Flyers	
2006	Otago Rebels	
2008	Southern Steel	
2009–2013	Waikato Bay of Plenty Magic	
Years	National team	Caps
2005–2006	New Zealand	
Medal record
Representing New Zealand
Commonwealth Games
Gold medal – first place	2006 Melbourne	Netball

Jessica Lee Tuki (born 28 October 1987 in New Plymouth, Taranaki) is a former New Zealand professional netball and basketball player. She played for the Northern Mystics in the ANZ Championship and was previously in the Silver Ferns in 2006. Tuki replaced Jodi Brown in the team to go to the 2006 Commonwealth Games in Melbourne, after Brown injured her knee. She has previously played for the Western Flyers (2004–05) and the Otago Rebels (2006) in the National Bank Cup. She also trialled for the Tall Ferns basketball team.

During the ANZ Championship era, Tuki has played in almost every position except for Centre.
