= Nicola Pettit =

New Zealand netball player

Personal information
- Born: Nicola Cooney; 27 May 1978 (age 47)

Nicola Pettit (née Cooney) (born 27 May 1978) is a New Zealand netball player in the ANZ Championship, playing for the Waikato/Bay of Plenty Magic.
