= Energy Events Centre =

Events venue in Rotorua, New Zealand

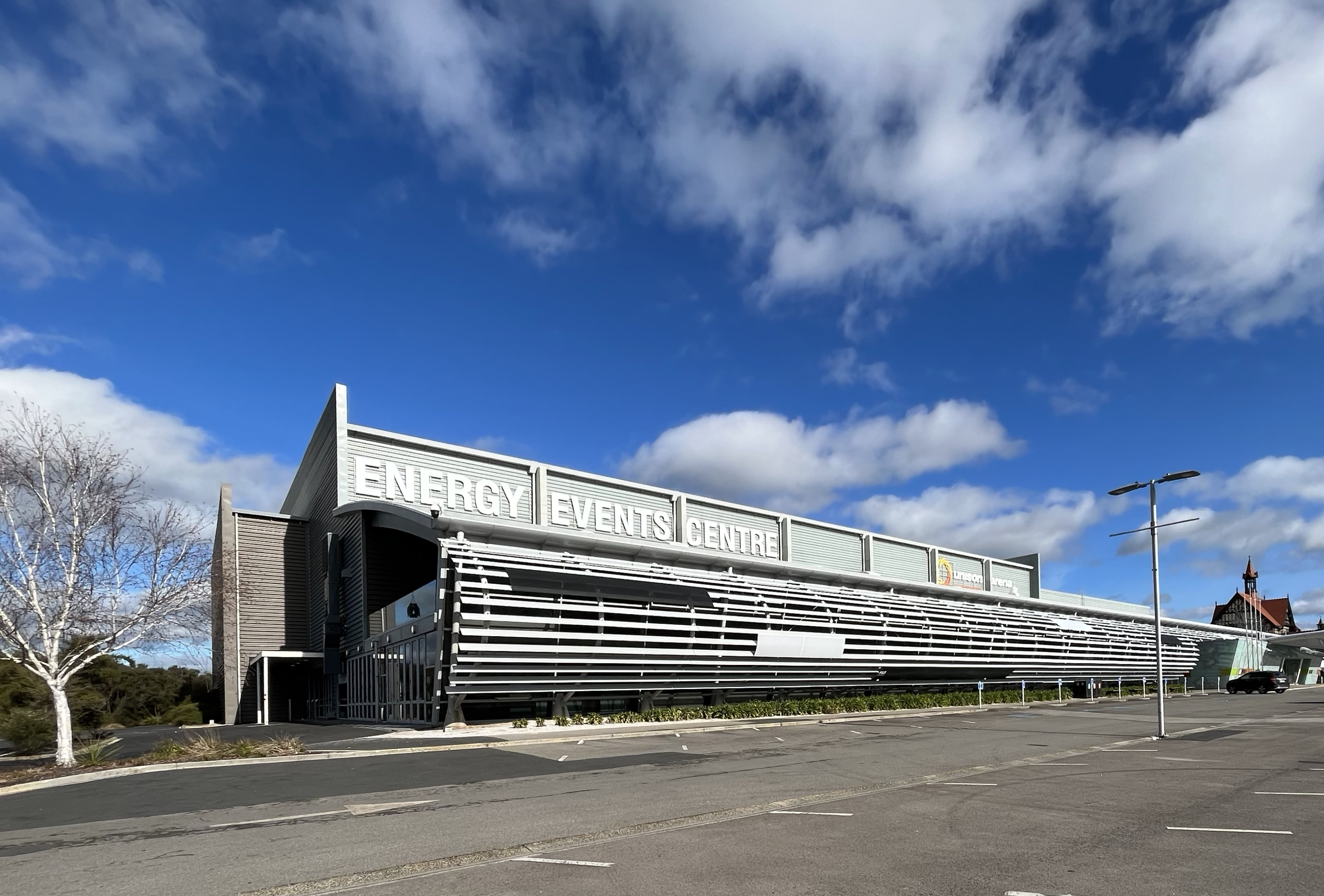
- Interactive map of Energy Events Centre
- Location: Rotorua, New Zealand
- Coordinates: 38°8′9″S 176°15′40″E
- Owner: Rotorua Lakes Council
- Capacity: 3,500

Construction
- Opened: 2007

Tenants
- Waikato/Bay of Plenty Magic (ANZ Championship) (2008–present); New Zealand Breakers (ANBL) (2021)

The Energy Events Centre is a venue for sports, conferences, exhibitions, banquets and concerts in Rotorua, New Zealand. The centre can hold up to 3,500 people and was finished in February 2007.

The driving force behind the establishment of the centre was Peter McLeod (died 2015) of Rotorua Lakes Council.

The main court is the current alternate home for the Waikato Bay of Plenty Magic netball team in the ANZ Championship. The franchise uses Mystery Creek Events Centre in Hamilton as their main home venue, with Queen Elizabeth Youth Centre in Tauranga as another alternate home.

On 13 May 2021, The New Zealand Breakers announced that they would play an Australian National Basketball League Game against the Cairns Taipans at the venue on 2 June 2021. It was the first time the venue has hosted a Regular Season game in the League.
