= Queen Elizabeth Youth Centre =

Entertainment centre in Tauranga, New Zealand

Coordinates: 37°41′58″S 176°9′49″E

Queen Elizabeth Youth Centre (QEYC) is a multi-purpose indoor sporting events and entertainment centre in Tauranga, New Zealand. The centre has a maximum capacity of 2,580, having completed renovations in 2006. It hosts basketball and volleyball events regularly, and can also accommodate badminton and netball events.

In 2008, QEYC was excluded as a venue for ANZ Championship matches because it did not match the 3000-seat minimum requirement. However, the centre has been scheduled to host two ANZ Championship matches for the Waikato/Bay of Plenty Magic in the 2009 season, for home games that could not be held at the franchise's other home venues due to other bookings.
