= Jodi Tod =

New Zealand netball player

Jodi Tod-Elliott
Personal information
- Born: 4 February 1981 (age 45)
- Height: 1.81 m (5 ft 11 in)

Netball career
- Playing positions: GD, WD, GK
Years	Club team	Apps
- Waikato Bay of Plenty Magic
- Northern Mystics

Jodi Tod-Elliott (born 4 February 1981) is a New Zealand netball player in the ANZ Championship, playing for Waikato Bay of Plenty Magic and Northern Mystics.
