= Hayley Stockman =

New Zealand netball player

Personal information
- Born: 15 December 1985 (age 39); Waikato, New Zealand
- Height: 1.85 m (6 ft 1 in)
- Occupation: Lab tech

Hayley Stockman (born 15 December 1985) is a New Zealand netball player in the ANZ Championship who played for the Canterbury Tactix.
