= Nikala Smith =

Australian netball player

Personal information
- Born: 26 January 1987 (age 39)
- Occupations: ANZ Service Consultant, Student
- Height: 1.82 m (6 ft 0 in)

Netball career
- Playing positions: GA, GS
Years	Club team	Apps
2003–2005	Perth Orioles	
2006	AIS Canberra Darters	
2007	Perth Orioles	
2008–2009; 2012	West Coast Fever	
- Updated on 2009-03-29

Nikala Smith (born 26 January 1987) is a former Australian netball player in the ANZ Championship, playing for the West Coast Fever. Smith played 56 games in the Commonwealth Bank Trophy, as a member of the Perth Orioles (2003–05, 2007) and the AIS Canberra Darters (2006). Her career peaked when she won a premiership with the side voted the best in Australian indoor netball history, the Spinning Snap Kicks.
