= Frances Solia =

Samoan netball player

Personal information
- Born: 20 September 1976 (age 49) Wellington, New Zealand
- Occupations: Professional Netball Player; Multi Business Owner
- Height: 1.69 m (5 ft 7 in)

Netball career
Years	Club team	Apps
- Waikato Bay of Plenty Magic; Central Pulse
Years	National team	Caps
- Samoa

Frances Solia (born 20 September 1976) is a Samoan netball player in the ANZ Championship, playing for the Waikato/Bay of Plenty Magic in New Zealand. She previously played for the Central Pulse, where she was captain in 2008. She was the captain of the Samoan National Netball Team until 2011.

She retired in 2012 in order to start a family.
