= Halana Leith =

New Zealand netball player

Personal information
- Height: 1.76 m (5 ft 9 in)

Netball career
- Playing positions: GA, WA
Years	Club team	Apps
2008–2009	Waikato Bay of Plenty Magic	
- Updated on 5 April 2010

Halana Leith is a New Zealand netball player. She played in the ANZ Championship for the Waikato Bay of Plenty Magic from 2008–09. A goal attack for the Waikato provincial side, Leith became increasingly used as a wing attack with the Magic. She received little court time in two ANZ Championship seasons, and was injured during the 2009 major semi-final against the Melbourne Vixens. Leith was not signed for 2010.
