= Amigene Metcalfe =

New Zealand netball player

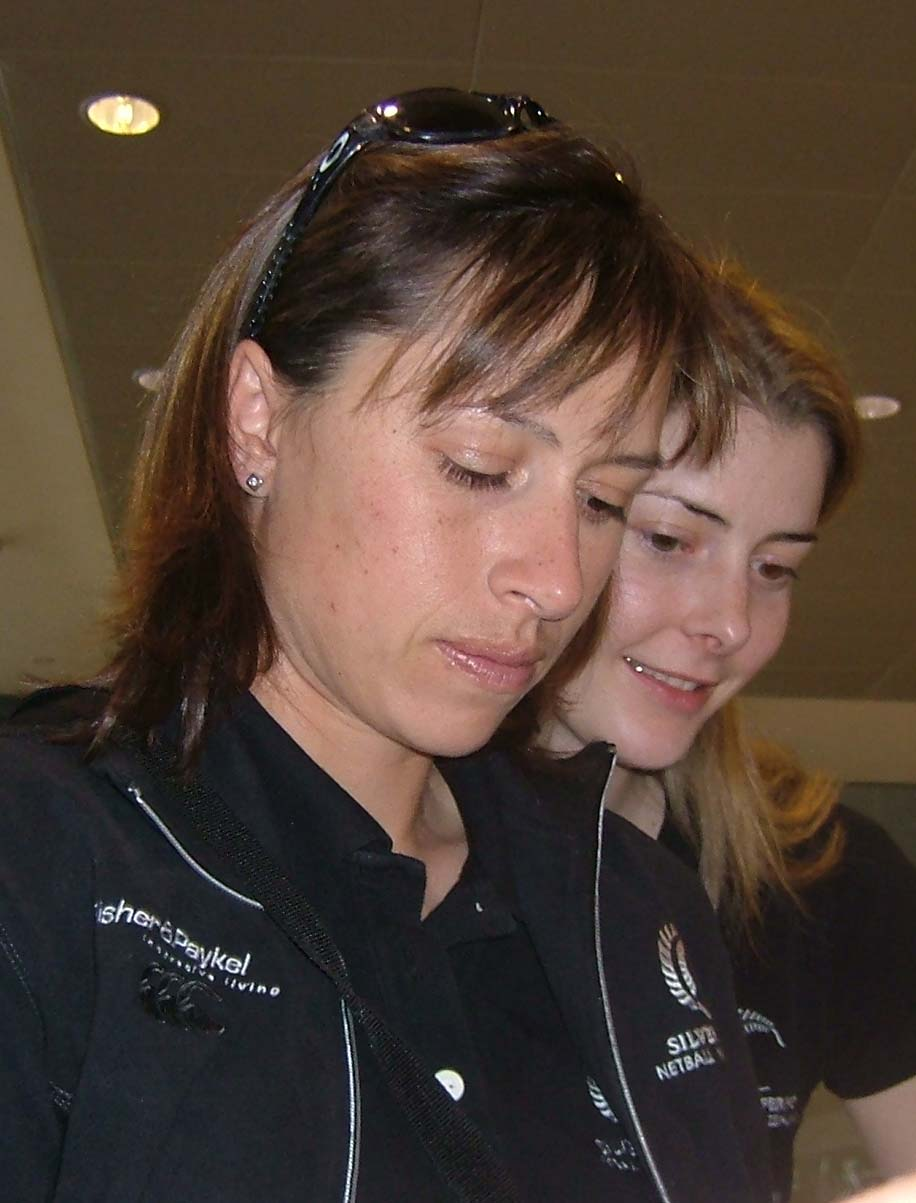
- Amigene Metcalfe in November 2004

Personal information
- Born: 17 January 1974 (age 52) Hamilton, New Zealand
- Height: 1.68 m (5 ft 6 in)

Netball career
- Playing positions: WA, C
Years	Club team	Apps
2008	Waikato Bay of Plenty Magic	
Years	National team	Caps
2004	New Zealand	1
- Updated on 2009-06-01

Amigene Metcalfe (born 18 January 1974 in Hamilton, New Zealand) is a New Zealand netball player. Metcalfe played international netball with the Silver Ferns in 2004, and later captained the New Zealand A team in 2005. She also played eight years in the National Bank Cup, and one year in the ANZ Championship as captain for the Waikato Bay of Plenty Magic. Metcalfe resigned from the Magic after one season to spend more time with her family.

In 2021 she resigned as coach for the Waikato Bay of Plenty Magic.
