= Joline Henry =

New Zealand netball player

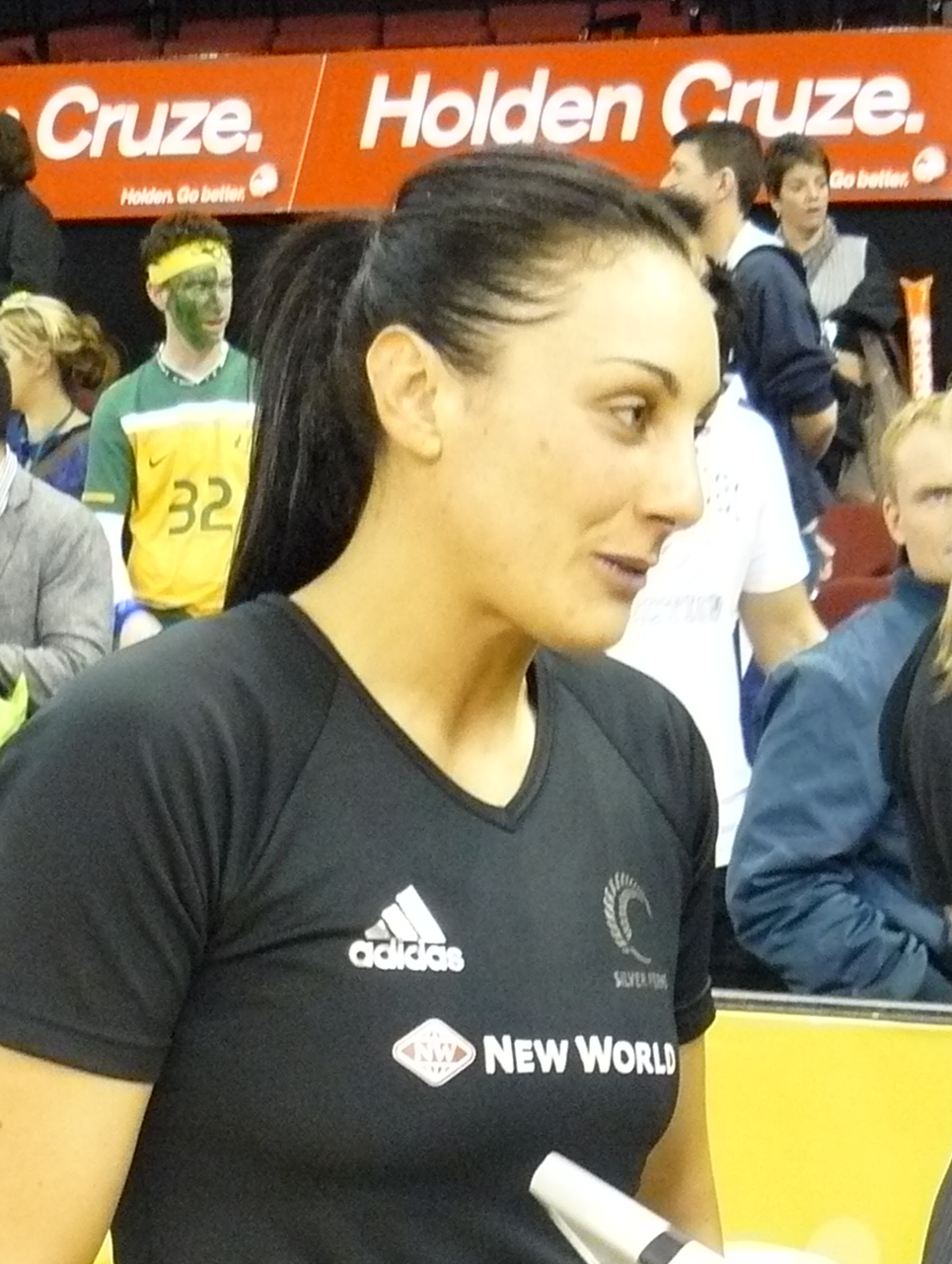
- Henry in 2010

Personal information
- Born: 29 September 1982 (age 44) Whanganui, New Zealand
- Height: 1.83 m (6 ft 0 in)

Netball career
- Playing positions: GD, WD
Years	Club team	Apps
1999–2000	Western Flyers	
2001–09	Waikato Bay of Plenty Magic	
2010–2013	Northern Mystics	23
2014–2015	Central Pulse	
Years	National team	Caps
1999–2000, 03	New Zealand U21	
2000–03	New Zealand A	
2003–2014	Silver Ferns	91
Medal record
Representing New Zealand
Netball World Championships
Silver medal – second place	2007 Auckland	Netball
Commonwealth Games
Gold medal – first place	2010 Delhi	Netball
World Netball Series
Gold medal – first place	2009 Manchester	Fastnet
- Updated on 13 June 2011

Joline Johansson (nee Henry, born 29 September 1982 in Whanganui, New Zealand) is a New Zealand former netball player. Henry was a member of the New Zealand national netball team, the Silver Ferns, and has played for the Waikato/Bay of Plenty Magic (2008–2009) and the Northern Mystics (2010–2011) in the ANZ Championship. In 2012, Henry played with the Central Pulse for the 2012 ANZ Championship.

== Early life ==
Joline Henry was adopted as tamaiti whāngai under tikanga Māori and raised by her grandparents.

== Career ==
Henry started her professional career in 1999 as a 15-year-old playing for the Western Flyers in the Coca-Cola Cup (later the National Bank Cup). She moved to the Waikato Bay of Plenty Magic after two years, winning two National Bank Cup titles in 2005 and 2006.

Henry was selected for the Silver Ferns in 2003, and made her on-court debut the following year against Australia. She missed out on the team for the 2006 Commonwealth Games in Melbourne, but was selected for the 2007 Netball World Championships in Auckland, where New Zealand finished runners-up. She was also included in the Silver Ferns side that won the inaugural World Netball Series in 2009 and the 2010 Commonwealth Games in Delhi.

With the start of the ANZ Championship in 2008, Henry remained with the Waikato Bay of Plenty Magic. But in 2009, after eight years with the Magic franchise, Henry announced through her agent that she was moving to the Auckland-based Northern Mystics, following a contract dispute. She was joined by fellow Silver Ferns and former Magic teammate Maria Tutaia for the 2010 season. Henry later on moved to the Central Pulse. She retired from international sport in 2014, and in 2016 took up a position at the Harrow International School in Hong Kong. She now works as the Housemaster of Bishops House at Whanganui Collegiate School.
