= Susan Tagicakibau =

Fijian netball player (born 1988)

Personal information
- Born: January 14, 1988 (age 38)

Netball career
- Playing positions: GA, GS
Years	Club team	Apps
- Central Pulse
Years	National team	Caps
- Fiji

Susan Tagicakibau (born January 14, 1988) is a Fijian netball player. She was a member of the Fijian national netball team, Tagicakibau played in the ANZ Championship for the Central Pulse.
