= Mystery Creek Events Centre =

Event center in New Zealand

- Interactive map of Mystery Creek Events Centre
- Location: Gate 2, 125 Mystery Creek Rd, Hamilton, New Zealand
- Coordinates: 37°52′17″S 175°21′9″E
- Capacity: Up to 45,000

Tenants
- Parachute Christian Music Festival; Waikato/Bay of Plenty Magic (ANZ Championship) (2008–2011)

Mystery Creek Events Centre is one of New Zealand's biggest events centres. Located in the outskirts of Hamilton, New Zealand, it is home to many events, the largest being the National Agricultural Fieldays which is held annually in June.

Mystery Creek Events Centre contains 114 hectares of land and event versatility with multi-functional facilities and an abundance of indoor and outdoor space ensuring the centre can host all components of an event on one property.

From 2004 to 2014 Mystery Creek hosted the annual Parachute Christian Music Festival and from 2015 has hosted the replacement event Festival One.

It also hosts Equidays, THE Expo, the New Zealand Motorhome, Caravan & Leisure Show, the BYM Baptist Ministries Easter Camp and many more popular events. The events centre has hosted many sports including; international netball, Davis Cup tennis matches, Rally New Zealand and boxing.

Mystery Creek has been the venue for previous New Zealand Scout Jamborees, including those held in 2019–2020 and 2023–2024.
