= Waikato Bay of Plenty Magic =

New Zealand netball team

- Founded: 1998
- Based in: Hamilton
- Regions: Waikato; Bay of Plenty
- Home venue: Globox Arena
- Head coach: Mary-Jane Araroa
- Captain: Ameliaranne Ekenasio
- Premierships: 3 (2005, 2006, 2012)
- League: ANZ Premiership
- Website: netballmagic.co.nz
Uniform

Waikato Bay of Plenty Magic are a New Zealand netball team based in Hamilton. The team were formed in 1998, following the merger of Waikato Wildcats and Bay of Plenty Magic. In 1997, Wildcats and Magic had been founder members of the Coca-Cola Cup/National Bank Cup league. Between 1999 and 2007, the new team continued to play in the league. Magic are the only team from the Coca-Cola Cup/National Bank Cup era to have retained their original name. Between 2008 and 2016, they played in the ANZ Championship. Since 2017, Magic have represented Netball Waikato Bay of Plenty in the ANZ Premiership. Netball Waikato Bay of Plenty is the governing body that represents the North Island regions of Waikato and Bay of Plenty. During the National Bank Cup era, Magic were premiers in 2005 and 2006. During the ANZ Championship era, Magic were the most successful New Zealand team. In 2008 they were minor premiers and they were grand finalists in 2008 and 2010 before winning the overall title in 2012. They were the only New Zealand team to win the ANZ Championship.

== History ==
=== Formation ===
In 1998 Waikato Wildcats, featuring Jenny-May Coffin, and Bay of Plenty Magic, with Lyn Gunson as head coach, became founder members of the Coca-Cola Cup/National Bank Cup league. In 1999 these two teams merged to become Waikato Bay of Plenty Magic. Gunson became the new team's first coach. Amigene Metcalfe, Tania Nicholson and Cushla Lichtwark were all members of the team's first squad.

=== Coca-Cola Cup/National Bank Cup ===
Between 1999 and 2007, Waikato Bay of Plenty Magic played in the Coca-Cola Cup/National Bank Cup league. During this era, they were coached by three future New Zealand national netball team head coaches – Lyn Gunson, Ruth Aitken and Noeline Taurua. In 2005 and 2006, with a team coached by Taurua and featuring Amigene Metcalfe, Irene van Dyk, Casey Williams, Laura Langman and Joline Henry, Magic won two successive National Bank Cup titles. On both occasions they defeated Southern Sting in the grand final. Magic are the only team from the Coca-Cola Cup/National Bank Cup era to have retained their original name.

Statistics

| Season | Position | Won | Drawn | Lost |
|---|---|---|---|---|
| 1999 | 9th | | | |
| 2000 | 7th | | | |
| 2001 | 3rd | | | |
| 2002 | 7th | | | |
| 2003 | 3rd | | | |
| 2004 | 3rd | | | |
| 2005 | 1st | | | |
| 2006 | 1st | | | |
| 2007 | 3rd | | | |

Winners

=== ANZ Championship ===
Between 2008 and 2016, Magic played in the ANZ Championship. Magic were the most successful New Zealand team during ANZ Championship era. With a team coached by Noeline Taurua, captained by Amigene Metcalfe and featuring Irene van Dyk, Magic finished the 2008 season as minor premiers and overall runners-up. During the regular season Magic won 10 of their 13 matches and finished above eventual champions New South Wales Swifts. Magic subsequently lost to Swifts in the major semi–final, defeated Adelaide Thunderbirds in the preliminary final before losing the grand final to Swifts.

In 2009 Magic were regular season runners up. In 2010, Magic were grand finalists once again. They finished the regular season third behind Swifts and Thunderbirds. They subsequently defeated Southern Steel in the minor semi-final and Swifts in the preliminary final but lost to Thunderbirds in the grand final. In 2011 they were again regular season runners up.

In 2012, with a team coached by Taurua, captained by Laura Langman and featuring Leana de Bruin, Irene van Dyk, Julianna Naoupu and Casey Williams, Magic eventually won the premiership. Magic lost their first four matches. However, they subsequently won 12 matches in a row to finish third during the regular season and champions overall. In the minor semi-final they defeated Thunderbirds and in the preliminary final they defeated Northern Mystics after extra time. In the grand final they defeated Melbourne Vixens 41–38. As a result, they became the first, and only, New Zealand team to win the Championship. They were also the first and only team to start the season with four defeats and win the title and the first and only team to finish third in the regular season and win the title.

In July 2013, Julie Fitzgerald was appointed head coach of Magic. Between 2014 and 2016, she guided Magic to the ANZ Championship Finals Series every season. In both 2015 and 2016, she guided Magic to the New Zealand Conference titles.

Regular season statistics

| Season | Position | Won | Drawn | Lost |
|---|---|---|---|---|
| 2008 | 1st | 10 | 0 | 3 |
| 2009 | 2nd | 11 | 0 | 2 |
| 2010 | 3rd | 9 | 0 | 4 |
| 2011 | 2nd | 10 | 0 | 3 |
| 2012 | 3rd | 9 | 0 | 4 |
| 2013 | 3rd | 9 | 0 | 4 |
| 2014 | 4th | 8 | 0 | 5 |
| 2015 | 5th | 5 | 1 | 7 |
| 2016 | 6th | 6 | 0 | 7 |

Minor premiers and grand finalists
Grand finalists
Premiers

=== ANZ Premiership ===
Since 2017, Magic have played in the ANZ Premiership.

Regular season statistics

| Season | Position | Won | Drawn | Lost |
|---|---|---|---|---|
| 2017 | 4th | 7 | 8 | 5 |
| 2018 | 5th | 5 | 10 | 3 |
| 2019 | 4th | 5 | 10 | 0 |
| 2020 | 6th | 2 | 9 | 3 |
| 2021 | 6th | 1 | 0 | 14 |
| 2022 | 5th | 4 | 0 | 11 |
| 2023 | 5th | 6 | 0 | 9 |
| 2024 | 4th | 9 | 0 | 6 |
| 2025 | 5th | 2 | 0 | 8 |

== Grand finals ==
National Bank Cup

| Season | Winners | Score | Runners up | Venue |
|---|---|---|---|---|
| 2005 | Waikato Bay of Plenty Magic | 65–39 | Southern Sting | Stadium Southland |
| 2006 | Waikato Bay of Plenty Magic | 67–43 | Southern Sting | Mystery Creek Events Centre |

ANZ Championship

| Season | Winners | Score | Runners up | Venue |
|---|---|---|---|---|
| 2008 | New South Wales Swifts | 65–56 | Waikato Bay of Plenty Magic | Acer Arena |
| 2010 | Adelaide Thunderbirds | 52–42 | Waikato Bay of Plenty Magic | Adelaide Entertainment Centre |
| 2012 | Waikato Bay of Plenty Magic | 41–38 | Melbourne Vixens | Hisense Arena |

== Home venues ==
Since 2012, Magic's main home venue has been Claudelands Arena, now known as the Globox Arena. They also play home matches at Tauranga's ASB Baypark Stadium and Rotorua's Energy Events Centre. Between 1998 and 2011, Mystery Creek Events Centre served as Magic's main Hamilton home venue. During this era they also played their Tauranga matches at the Queen Elizabeth Youth Centre.

| | Years |
|---|---|
| Claudelands Arena/Globox Arena | 2012– |
| ASB Baypark Stadium | 2012– |
| Energy Events Centre | |
| Mystery Creek Events Centre | 1998–2011 |
| Queen Elizabeth Youth Centre | 200x–2011 |

== Notable players ==
=== 2026 squad ===
2026 Waikato Bay of Plenty Magic roster
Players
Coaching staff

| Nat. | Name | Position(s) | DoB | Height |
|---|---|---|---|---|
| (New Zealand) | Georgie Edgecombe | WA, C, WD | 10 April 2001 (age 25) | 1.77 m (5 ft 10 in) |
| (New Zealand) | Oceane Maihi | GK, GD, WD | 23 December 1995 (age 30) | 1.83 m (6 ft 0 in) |
| (New Zealand) | Erena Mikaere (vc) | GK, GD, WD | 9 July 1988 (age 38) | 1.92 m (6 ft 4 in) |
| (New Zealand) | Kate Taylor | GS, GA | 24 June 2004 (age 22) | 1.90 m (6 ft 3 in) |
| (Samoa) | Saviour Tui | GS,GA | 17 October 2001 (age 25) | 1.87 m (6 ft 2 in) |
| (New Zealand) | Ali Wilshier | WA, C | 29 April 1999 (age 27) | 1.64 m (5 ft 5 in) |
| (New Zealand) | Ariana Cable-Dixon | WA, C | 5 September 1993 (age 33) | 1.69 m (5 ft 7 in) |
| (New Zealand) | Sarah Guiney | GA,GS | | – |
| (New Zealand) | Brooklyn Murray | GD,WD | | – |
| (New Zealand) | Losa Fifita | GD,GK | | – |

Head coach

- Mary-Jane Araroa

Assistant coach

- Rebecca Gabel

Manager: Amanda Dyason
Physiotherapist: Oliver Cuomo
Strength and conditioning: Cory Miles

Notes

- (c) – Captain
- (cc) – Co-captain
- (vc) – Vice-captain
- – Injury / maternity leave
- (TRP) – Temporary Replacement Player
Player profiles: Team website
Last updated: 19 February 2026

=== Internationals ===
New Zealand

- Jodi Brown
- Jenny-May Clarkson
- Leana de Bruin
- Tania Dalton
- Victoria Edward
- Ameliaranne Ekenasio
- Temalisi Fakahokotau
- Monica Falkner
- Maria Folau
- Ellen Halpenny
- Joline Henry
- Kelly Jury
- Claire Kersten
- Laura Langman
- Bailey Mes
- Amigene Metcalfe
- Erena Mikaere
- Claire O'Brien
- Katrina Rore
- Whitney Souness
- Anna Stanley
- Courtney Tairi
- Sulu Tone-Fitzpatrick
- Jessica Tuki
- Malia Vaka
- Irene van Dyk
- Casey Williams
- Samantha Winders

New Zealand Fast5

- Grace Rasmussen
- Hayley Saunders
- Kristiana Manu'a

Australia

- Caitlin Bassett
- Kristiana Manu'a
- Jamie-Lee Price
- Peta Scholz

England

- Jade Clarke
- Joanne Harten

Samoa

- Julianna Naoupu
- Frances Solia
- Saviour Tui

South Africa

- Leana de Bruin
- Lenize Potgieter
- Irene van Dyk
- Liezel Wium

=== Captains ===
| | Years |
|---|---|
| Jenny-May Coffin | 2000?–2004 |
| Amigene Metcalfe | 2005?–2008 |
| Joline Henry | 2007, 2009 |
| Irene van Dyk | 2007, 2009 |
| Laura Langman | 2010–2013 |
| Casey Kopua | 2014–2015 |
| Leana de Bruin | 2014–2016 |
| Casey Kopua | 2017–2019 |
| Samantha Winders | 2020–2022 |
| Ameliaranne Ekenasio | 2023– |

=== Award winners ===
==== ANZ Championship awards ====
ANZ Championship MVP

| Season | Player |
|---|---|
| 2012 | Laura Langman ^{(Note 1)} |
| 2014 | Joanne Harten ^{(Note 2)} |

Notes

- ^1 Laura Langman and Temepara George shared the 2013 award.
- ^2 Joanne Harten and Kimberlee Green shared the 2014 award.

ANZ Championship Grand Final MVP

| Season | Player |
|---|---|
| 2012 | Leana de Bruin |

ANZ Championship Best New Talent

| Season | Player |
|---|---|
| 2012 | Julianna Naoupu |

== Coaches ==
=== Head coaches ===
| Coach | Years |
|---|---|
| Lyn Gunson | 1999–2000 |
| Alison Wieringa | 2000 |
| Tracey Fear | 2000 |
| Ruth Aitken | 2001–2002 |
| Noeline Taurua | 2002–2003 |
| Nicole Dryden | 2004 |
| Noeline Taurua | 2005–2013 |
| Julie Fitzgerald | 2013–2016 |
| Margaret Forsyth | 2017–2019 |
| Amigene Metcalfe | 2019–2021 |
| Mary-Jane Araroa | 2021– |

=== Assistant coaches ===
| Coach | Years |
|---|---|
| Noeline Taurua | 2001–2002 |
| Karen Henrikson | 2004 |
| Hikitia Gallagher | c.2008–2010 |
| Tanya Dearns | 2013 |
| Margaret Foster | 2010–2011 |
| Margaret Forsyth | 2013–2017 |
| Amigene Metcalfe | 2017–2018 |
| Mary-Jane Araroa | 2018–2021 |

== Main sponsors ==
| Sponsors | Seasons |
|---|---|
| Anchor | 1999 |
| Fonterra | 2000 |
| ColourPlus | 200x–2009 |
| First Windows and Doors | 2010–2012 |
| Kia | 2012–2015 |
| Cold Power | 2016– |
| Splice Construction | 2019–2022 |
| Avis | 2023– |

== Reserve teams ==
National Bank Cup era

During the National Bank Cup era, Magic also had a development team. Its head coaches included Hikitia Gallagher and Rhonda Wilcox while Hayley Stockman was a former player.

National Netball League

Since 2016, Netball Waikato Bay of Plenty have entered a team in the National Netball League. In 2018 and 2019 Waikato Bay of Plenty were NNL grand finalists. However, on both occasions they lost to Central Zone/Central Manawa.

== Honours ==
- National Bank Cup
  - Winners: 2005, 2006
- ANZ Championship
  - Winners: 2012
  - Runners Up: 2008, 2010
  - Minor premiers: 2008
- ANZ Championship – New Zealand Conference
  - Winners: 2015, 2016
