= Netball in Europe =

Sport in Europe

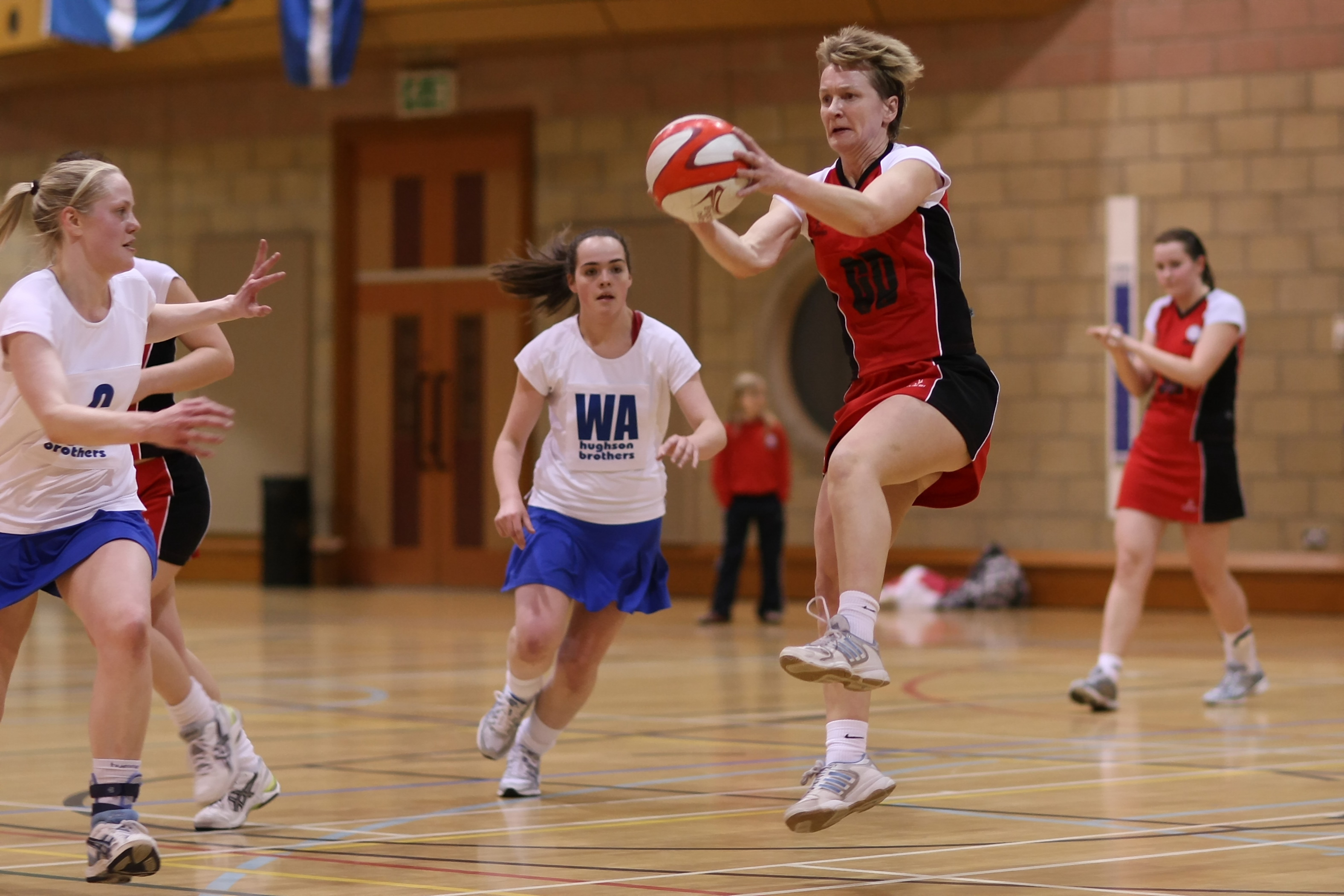
Orkney A (red) v Shetland A (white/blue): intercounty netball (March 2009) in Scotland.

Netball is primarily played in Commonwealth countries, which were heavily involved in standardising the rules for netball. The Federation of European Netball Associations (FENA), sometimes referred to as Netball Europe, is the governing body for netball in the Europe netball region. The organisation was created in 1989/1990. As of August 2016, the English women's national team was ranked 3rd in the world, Wales is ranked 8th, Scotland is ranked 10th, Northern Ireland is ranked 12th, Ireland are ranked 25th, Gibraltar are ranked 31st, Malta are ranked 32nd and Switzerland are ranked 34th.

The major netball competition in Europe is the Netball Superleague. The Netball Superleague is the elite netball competition in England and Wales. The league features eight teams from all areas of Britain.

== United Kingdom ==
In the United Kingdom, netball management has been traditionally run by women. This is different from many other sports for women in the United Kingdom where men have managed women's sport.

=== England ===
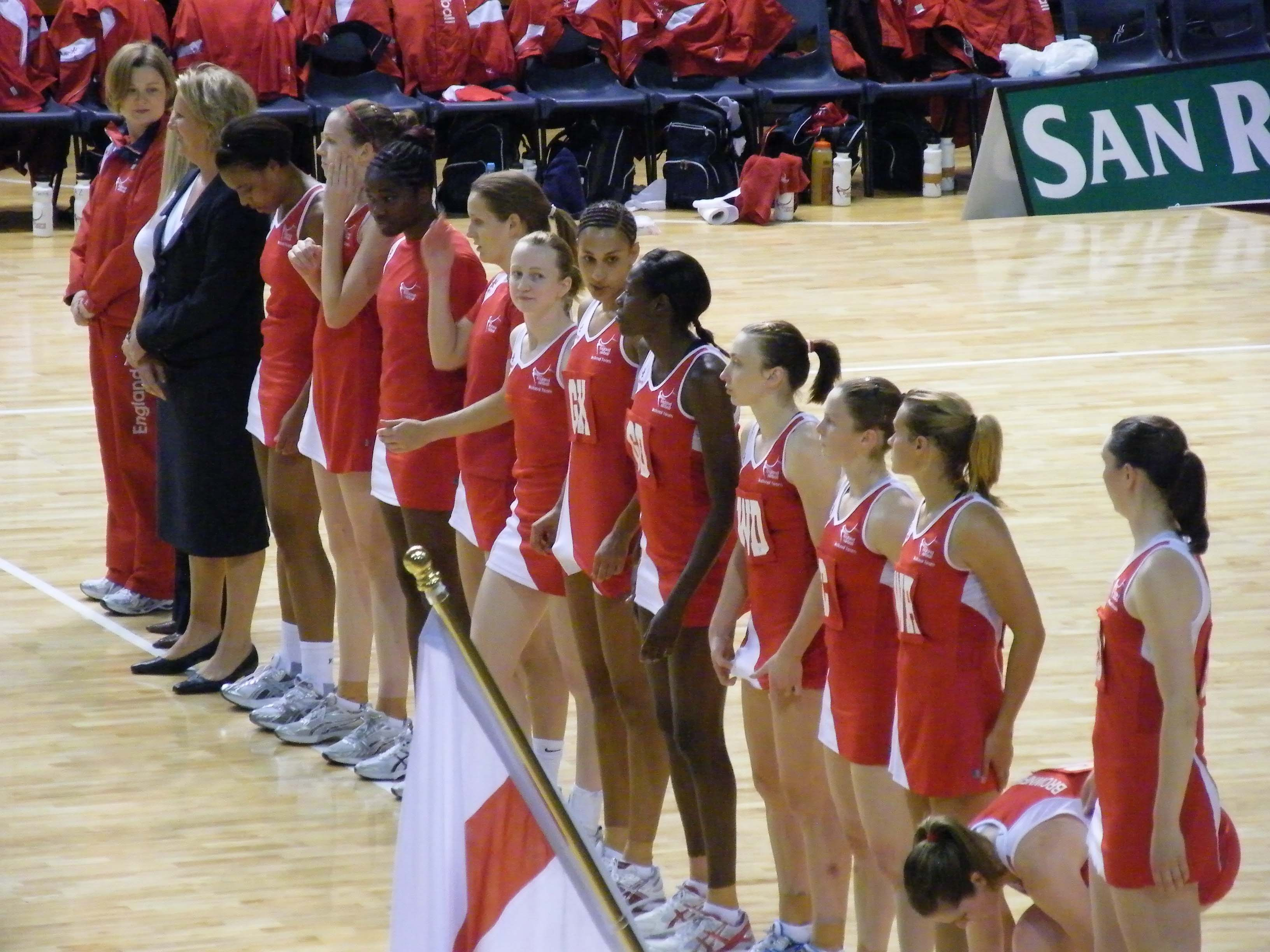
The English national team at the England v Australia Netball test: Adelaide, October 2008.

In England, netball has been popular enough to be included as part of the physical education curriculum. Its inclusion had been at times controversial; during the 1910s and 1920s, schools worried about the potential negative impact of physical exercise like netball participation on the health of girls.

=== Wales ===
The Welsh Netball Association (Cymdeithas Pêl Rwyd Cymru) was created in 1945. The WNA is responsible for national championships, Welsh squad selection, international matches, the training and development of players, coaches, and umpires and for the Sport Wales National Centre Netball Academy, Cardiff. The Welsh Netball Association is based in Pontcanna, Cardiff. Similar to other national associations, the Welsh have created a modified version of the game for children called "Dragon Netball". It is geared for seven- to eleven-year-olds. Male participation in netball in Wales has been increasing in the past several years.

=== Northern Ireland ===
The rate of comparative participation for netball to other sports differs from key-stage to key-stage (year levels in school) in Northern Ireland. For girls, netball is the third most popular participation sport in key-stage 2 with a 7% participation rate. For key-stage 3 and key-stage 4, it is the most popular girls participation sport with rates of 20.2% and 14.0% respectively. In the sixth form, netball is the fifth most popular girls' participation sport with a rate of 6.7%. The total number of school participants is about 900. In Northern Ireland, about 1,300 women play competitive netball in club based leagues.

== Switzerland ==
A group of volunteers formed the Netball Switzerland governing body in 2008. The group has had a formal under 17 team since 2010, with netball teams and matches held regularly in Geneva, Basel and Zurich.

== National teams ==
Europe Netball currently has 13 full members

Full Members

Team	Association
England	England Netball
France	Netball France
Gibraltar	Gibraltar Netball Association
Isle of Man	Isle of Man Netball
Israel	Israel Netball
Italy	
Malta	Malta Netball Association
Northern Ireland	Netball Northern Ireland
Republic of Ireland	Netball Ireland
Scotland	Netball Scotland
Switzerland	Swiss Netball
United Arab Emirates	UAE Netball Federation
Wales	Wales Netball

Europe Netball Emerging Members

Team	Association
Portugal	
Sweden	
Qatar	

Other netball nations

Team	Association
Austria	
Denmark	
Germany	
Guernsey	Guernsey Netball Association
Jersey	
Netherlands	
Spain	
Turkey	
Ukraine	

== Bibliography ==
- England Netball. "History of England Netball (1891–2008)". Archived from the original on 19 July 2011.
- England Netball (2010a). "The FIAT Netball Superleague".
- England Netball (2010). "Netball Europe". Archived from the original on 19 July 2011.
- FIAT Netball Superleague. "History".
- International Federation of Netball Associations (15 June 2008). "History of Netball". Archived from the original on 6 March 2011.
- International Federation of Netball Associations (2011). "IFNA: Wales". Archived from the original on 18 March 2011.
- International Federation of Netball Associations (21 January 2011a). "Current World Rankings". Archived from the original on 19 May 2011.
- Loughborough Lightning (2011). "Loughborough Lightning History". Loughborough Lightning. Archived from the original on 7 March 2011.
- Mahoney, Craid (July 1997). "Age and sport participation". In Kremer, John; Ogle, Saun; Trew, Karen (eds.). Young people's involvement in sport. Routledge. ISBN 978-0-415-16650-8. OCLC 36225511.
- Western Argus (24 October 1922). "GAMES FOR GIRLS". Western Argus (Kalgoorlie, WA : 1916–1938). Kalgoorlie, WA: National Library of Australia. p. 1.
- Welsh Netball Association (2009). "Welsh Netball Association – History". Welsh Netball Association website. Welsh Netball Association. Archived from the original on 9 March 2011.
- White, Anita (December 2002). "Women and sport in the UK". In Pfister, Gertrud; Hartmann-Tews, Ilse (eds.). Sport and Women: Social Issues in International Perspective. International Society for Comparative Physical Education & Sport. New York: Routledge. ISBN 0-415-24628-8. OCLC 50204306.
