= List of national netball teams =

The following is a list of active national netball teams. World Netball has over 80 members. This includes full and associate members. In addition the five regional federations, representing Africa, the Americas, Asia, Europe and Oceania also have full and associate members. Since 2008, World Netball has published the World Netball Rankings, ranking the senior teams of member countries.

== World Netball Rankings ==
Since 2008, World Netball has published the World Netball Rankings. The rankings cover test matches played between the senior teams of member countries.

Top 20 Last updated: 1 June 2025
Rank	Change	Team	Played	Weighted	Points	Rating
1	Steady	Australia	44	26	5,308	204
2	Steady	New Zealand	45	26	5,072	195
3	Steady	Jamaica	41	24	4,602	192
4	Steady	England	52	33	6,089	185
5	Steady	South Africa	50	33	5,365	163
6	▲3	Wales	31	19	2,353	124
7	▼1	Uganda	40	25	3,040	122
8	▼1	Malawi	43	28	3,365	120
9	▼1	Tonga	40	25	2,934	117
10	Steady	Scotland	30	20	2,028	101
11	Steady	Trinidad and Tobago	25	13	1,222	94
12	Steady	Northern Ireland	27	21	1,906	91
13	Steady	Zimbabwe	38	25	2,223	89
14	▲4	Samoa	32	21	1,765	84
15	Steady	Zambia	22	13	1,000	77
16	▼2	Fiji	44	27	2,026	75
17	Steady	Saint Vincent and the Grenadines	24	15	1,119	75
18	▲1	Namibia	26	18	1,326	74
19	▼3	Barbados	35	19	1,375	72
20	▲	Botswana	16	8	468	59

== Teams by federation and region ==
=== Africa ===
Full Members

Team	Association
Botswana	Botswana Netball Association
Burundi	
Eswatini	Netball Eswatini
Ghana	
Kenya	Kenya Netball Association
Ivory Coast	
Lesotho	Netball Association of Lesotho
Malawi	Netball Association of Malawi
Namibia	Netball Namibia
Nigeria	
South Africa	Netball South Africa
Tanzania	Netball Association of Tanzania
Uganda	Uganda Netball Federation
Zambia	Netball Association of Zambia
Zimbabwe	Zimbabwe Netball Association

Associate Members

Team	Association
(Democratic Republic of the Congo) DR Congo	
Liberia	
Seychelles	

Other netball nations

Team	Association
Angola	
Egypt	
Ethiopia	
Mauritius	
Senegal	
Sierra Leone	

=== Americas ===
Americas Netball currently has 18 full members and two associate members.

Full Members

Team	Association
Antigua and Barbuda	Antigua and Barbuda Netball Association
Argentina	Netball Federation of Argentina
Barbados	Barbados Netball Association
British Virgin Islands	
Bermuda	Bermuda Netball Association
Canada	Canadian Amateur Netball Association
Cayman Islands	Cayman Islands Netball Association
Dominica	
Grenada	Grenada Netball Association
Guadeloupe	
Jamaica	Netball Jamaica
Saint Kitts and Nevis	Saint Kitts and Nevis Netball Association
Saint Lucia	Saint Lucia National Netball Association
Saint Vincent and the Grenadines	Saint Vincent and the Grenadines Netball Association
Sint Eustatius	
Sint Maarten	
Trinidad and Tobago	Trinidad and Tobago Netball Association
United States	USA Netball

Associate Members

Team	Association
Dominican Republic	
Venezuela	

=== Asia ===
Asia Netball currently has of 18 full members and two associate members

Full Members

Team	Association
Australia	Netball Australia
Bangladesh	
Brunei	
Chinese Taipei	
Hong Kong	Hong Kong Netball Association
India	Netball Federation of India
Japan	
Malaysia	Malaysian Netball Association
Maldives	Netball Association of the Maldives
Nepal	
Pakistan	Pakistan Netball Federation
Philippines	Netball Philippines
Saudi Arabia	
Singapore	Netball Singapore
South Korea	
Sri Lanka	Netball Federation of Sri Lanka
Thailand	
Timor-Leste	

Associate Members

Team	Association
Bahrain	
Macau	

Other netball nations

Team	Association
Afghanistan	
Iraq	
Iran	
Indonesia	
Mongolia	
Myanmar	
Vietnam	

=== Europe ===
Europe Netball currently has 13 full members

Full Members

Team	Association
England	England Netball
France	Netball France
Gibraltar	Gibraltar Netball Association
Isle of Man	
Israel	
Italy	
Malta	Malta Netball Association
Northern Ireland	Netball Northern Ireland
Republic of Ireland	Netball Ireland
Scotland	Netball Scotland
Switzerland	Swiss Netball
Wales	Wales Netball
United Arab Emirates	

Europe Netball Emerging Members

Team	Association
Portugal	
Sweden	
Qatar	

Other netball nations

Team	Association
Austria	
Denmark	
Germany	
Guernsey	Guernsey Netball Association
Jersey	
Netherlands	
Spain	
Turkey	
Ukraine	

=== Oceania ===
Oceania Netball currently has 7 full members and two associate members

Full Members

Team	Association
Cook Islands	Cook Islands Netball Association
Fiji	Netball Fiji
New Zealand	Netball New Zealand
Papua New Guinea	Papua New Guinea Netball Association
Samoa	Samoa Netball Association
Solomon Islands	Solomon Islands Netball Federation
Tonga	

Associate Members

Team	Association
Niue	Niue Island Netball Association
Norfolk Island	

Other netball nations

Team	Association
American Samoa	
Kiribati	
Nauru	
Tokelau	
Tuvalu	
Vanuatu	Vanuatu Netball Association

== Men's national teams ==
Team	Association
Australia	Australian Men's and Mixed Netball Association
Botswana	
England	England Men's and Mixed Netball Association
New Zealand	New Zealand Men's and Mixed Netball Association
South Africa	Netball South Africa
Uganda	
Zimbabwe	
