= Netball in Wales =

- Country: Wales
- Governing body: Wales Netball
- National team: Wales
- First played: 1930s
- Registered players: 11,000

Netball in Wales is organised by Wales Netball. The Wales national netball team regularly competes in international netball competitions such as the Netball World Cup, Netball at the Commonwealth Games, the Netball Europe Open Championships and Netball World Cup Qualifiers. Since 2005–06, Wales has also effectively competed in the Netball Super League, initially playing as Celtic Dragons and later as Cardiff Dragons.

== Early history ==
There is evidence that netball was played in Wales in the late 1930s when a Miss George of the YMCA, organised matches in South Wales for the Coalfield Federation and a Miss Pugh Williams arranged matches in Cardiff. Sometime between 1943 and 1945, a group PE teachers, including Marion Morton of the Mary Datchelor School, which was evacuated to Llanelli for the duration of World War II, and Beatrice Williams from Carmarthenshire, formed a small committee to organise netball matches. This committee later became the Wales Netball Association. In 1944–45, Marion Morton also formed the first county team, Carmarthen, which began competing in English inter-counties tournaments.

== Governing body ==
Wales Netball (Welsh: Pêl-rwyd Cymru) is the main governing body for netball in Wales. It was originally founded in 1945 as the Welsh Netball Association (Welsh: Cymdeithas Pêl-rwyd Cymru). In 2021, it adopted its current name. It is affiliated to both World Netball and Europe Netball. Wales Netball were founding members of both these governing bodies. It is responsible for organising and administering the Wales national netball team and the Netball Super League team, Cardiff Dragons, as well local leagues and other competitions. Since 2009, its headquarters have been based at the Sport Wales National Centre.

== National team ==
The Wales national netball team made their Test debut on 7 May 1949 with a 14–13 win against Scotland. The match was played at the General Electric Company ground on Preston Road, Wembley during the 1949 England Scotland Wales Netball Series. Wales also played England for the first time on the same day, losing 25–3. They have since represented Wales Netball in various international netball competitions.

Debut	Tournament	Best result
1963	Netball World Cup	6th (1975, 1979)
1993	Netball at the World Games	6th (1993)
1998	Netball Europe Open Championships	1st (2001, 2013, 2014)
2002	Netball at the Commonwealth Games	6th (2002)
2007	Netball World Cup Qualifiers	1st (2007, 2015, 2023)
2010	Netball Singapore Nations Cup	1st (2010)

== Cardiff Dragons ==
Since 2005–06, the Wales national netball team has also effectively competed in the Netball Super League, initially playing as Celtic Dragons. Since 2024, they have played as Cardiff Dragons.

== International tournaments ==
Wales has hosted the following international tournaments.

Tournaments
2000 World Youth Netball Championships
2006 FENA Open
2010 Netball Europe Open Championships
2014 Netball Europe Open Championships
2017 Netball Europe Open Championships

== Venues ==
Venue	
Cardiff International Arena	Cardiff Dragons
Cardiff City House of Sport	Since 2023, the home of Cardiff Dragons
Sophia Gardens Pavilion	In 1957, hosted Wales' first indoor international netball matches
Sport Wales National Centre	Since 2009, the headquarters of Wales Netball; home of Celtic Dragons until 2022

== Competitions ==
=== Wales Netball National League ===
In 2023, Wales Netball, launched a new national league. It began with six teams and later expanded to eight. The teams represent the regions of Wales. Players who are included in the Wales, the Cardiff Dragons and other Netball Super League squads are ineligible to play in the national league.

Team	Region
City Flames	Cardiff Capital Region
Coastal Heat	Swansea Bay City Region
North East Inferno	North East Wales
North West Fury	North West Wales
Powys Sparks	Powys
South East Blaze	South East Wales
Valleys Volcanoes	South Wales Valleys
West Wales Phoenix	West Wales

=== Senior National Club Championship ===
1975 saw the introduction of the Senior National Club Championship. Newport Athletic Club were the inaugural champions. In 2023, after several years of inactivity the Championship was revived. Clubs compete in local leagues across Wales during the winter season, which typically concludes in the April/May. The top-performing clubs from these eligible leagues, plus the reigning champions, qualify for the national championship.
