= 2015 Netball Europe Open Challenge =

International netball tournament

Tournament details
- Host country: Northern Ireland
- City: Belfast
- Venue: Antrim Forum
- Dates: 14–16 May 2015
- Teams: 3
- TV partner: QTV Sports/StreamUK

Final positions
- Champions: Republic of Ireland
- Runners-up: Switzerland
- Third place: Malta

Tournament statistics
- Matches played: 6

The 2015 Netball Europe Open Challenge was a second level tournament organised by Netball Europe. It featured a series of netball test matches in May 2015 at Belfast's Antrim Forum. It was played alongside the first level tournament, the 2015 Netball Europe Open Championships. It featured three teams ranked between 28 and 36 – the Republic of Ireland, Malta and Switzerland. The Republic of Ireland won the tournament after winning all four of their matches. All matches were livestreamed by QTV Sports/StreamUK with Alison Mitchell as the lead commentator.

== Matches ==
=== Day 1 ===
14 May 2015	Republic of Ireland	36–14	Switzerland
8:30

14 May 2015	Switzerland	30–24	Malta
16:30

=== Day 2 ===
15 May 2015	Switzerland	43–22	Malta
8:30

15 May 2015	Republic of Ireland	51–23	Malta
14:30

=== Day 3 ===
16 May 2015	Republic of Ireland	51–18	Malta
8:30

16 May 2015	Republic of Ireland	51–14	Switzerland
14:30

== Final table ==
Pos	Team	P	W	D	L	GF	GA	GD	Pts
1	Republic of Ireland	4	4	0	0	189	69	+120	8
2	Switzerland	4	2	0	2	101	133	+32	4
3	Malta	4	0	0	4	87	175	-88	0
