= Bethan Dyke =

Wales netball international

Personal information
- Born: 25 December 1994 (age 31) Bridgend, Wales
- Height: 1.64 m (5 ft 5 in)
- School: Brynteg School
- University: Cardiff Metropolitan University

Netball career
- Playing positions: WA, C
Years	Club team	Apps
20xx–20xx	Pen-y-bont Dragons	
20xx–20xx	Cowbridge	
2013–2019	Celtic Dragons	
2017	→ Celtic Flames	
2020–2022	Severn Stars	30
2023–2024	Team Bath	
2025–	Cardiff Dragons	
Years	National team	Caps
2014–	Wales	77+

Bethan Dyke (born 25 December 1994) is a Wales netball international. She represented Wales at the 2014, 2018 and 2022 Commonwealth Games and at the 2015 and 2023 Netball World Cups. Since 2023, she has served as Wales' captain. In the Netball Super League, she has also played for Celtic Dragons, Severn Stars, Team Bath and Cardiff Dragons.

== Early life and education ==
Dyke is originally from Bridgend. She attended Brynteg School and Cardiff Metropolitan University, where she trained to be a teacher.

== Playing career ==
=== Early years ===
In her youth, Dyke played for Pen-y-bont Dragons and Cowbridge Netball Club.

=== Celtic Dragons ===
Between 2013 and 2019, Dyke played for Celtic Dragons in the Netball Super League. She was a member of the Dragons team that finished as runners up in 2013, losing 62–56 to Team Bath in the grand final. She also played for Dragons when they played as Celtic Flames in the 2017 Netball New Zealand Super Club. In April 2018, while playing for Wales at the Commonwealth Games, she suffered an ACL injury. On 25 February 2019, she made her return in a 2019 Round 7 match for Dragons against Manchester Thunder.

=== Severn Stars ===
In September 2019, together with Nia Jones and Georgia Rowe, she was one of three Wales netball internationals to sign for Stars. Between 2020 and 2022, Dyke made 30 Netball Super League appearances for Severn Stars. On April 4 2021, while playing for Stars in a 2021 Round 9 match against Celtic Dragons, she suffered another ACL injury.

=== Team Bath ===
Dyke played for Team Bath during the 2023 and 2024 seasons. She captained Team Bath for the 2024 season.

=== Cardiff Dragons ===
Ahead of the 2025 Netball Superleague season, Dyke signed for Cardiff Dragons.

=== Wales ===
On 30 May 2014, Dyke made her senior debut for Wales against the Republic of Ireland at the 2014 Netball Europe Open Championships. She subsequently represented Wales at the 2014, 2018 and 2022 Commonwealth Games and at the 2015 and 2023 Netball World Cups. On 7 April 2018, while playing for Wales against Scotland at the 2018 Commonwealth Games, she suffered an ACL injury. On 31 July 2022, at the 2022 Commonwealth Games, Dyke made her 50th senior appearance for Wales in a match against Scotland. In December 2023, together with Nia Jones, she was named as Wales' co-captain for a series against Uganda. In November 2024, Dyke captained Wales as they won the 2024 Celtic Cup. During the same tournament, on 8 November 2024, Dyke made her 75th senior appearance for Wales in a match against Northern Ireland.

Tournaments	Place
2014 Netball Europe Open Championships	1st
2014 Commonwealth Games	8th
2015 Netball Europe Open Championships	3rd
2015 Netball World Cup	7th
2016 Netball Europe Open Championships	2nd
2017 Netball Europe Open Championships	4th
2019 Netball World Cup Regional Qualifier – Europe	3rd
2018 Commonwealth Games	11th
2019 Netball Europe Open Championships	2th
2022 Commonwealth Games	8th
2023 Netball World Cup Regional Qualifier – Europe	1st
2023 Netball World Cup	9th
2024 Celtic Cup	1st
2025 Celtic Cup	2nd

== Honours ==
Wales

- Celtic Cup
  - Winners: 2024
- Netball Europe Open Championships
  - Winners: 2014
- Netball World Cup Qualifiers
  - Winners: 2023

Celtic Dragons

- Netball Superleague
  - Runners Up: 2013
