= 2016 Netball Europe Open Challenge =

International netball tournament

Tournament details
- Host country: England
- City: Newcastle upon Tyne
- Venue: Northumbria University's Sport Central
- Dates: 12–15 May 2016
- Teams: 7
- TV partner(s): QTV Sports; YouTube

Final positions
- Champions: Grenada (1st title)
- Runners-up: Republic of Ireland
- Third place: United States

Tournament statistics
- Matches played: 16

The 2016 Netball Europe Open Challenge was a second level tournament organised by Netball Europe. It featured seven teams playing a series of netball test matches in May 2016 at Northumbria University's Sport Central. It was played alongside the first level tournament, the 2016 Netball Europe Open Championships. Gibraltar, Israel, Malta, the Republic of Ireland and Switzerland were joined by two guest teams, Grenada and the United States. Grenada finished as overall winners after winning all five of their matches. However, the Republic of Ireland were declared winners of the European Section having defeated all three of their European opponents. Israel's Nomi Komar was named Player of the Tournament. The tournament was livestreamed by QTV Sports and featured on Netball Europe's YouTube channel.

== Group A ==
=== Round 1 ===
Thursday, 12 May 2016	United States	51–41	Malta

=== Round 2 ===
Thursday, 12 May 2016	United States	56–21	Switzerland

=== Round 3 ===
Friday, 13 May 2016	Switzerland	38–23	Malta

=== Table ===
Pos	Team	P	W	D	L	GF	GA	GD	Pts
1	United States	2	2	0	0	104	83	+21	4
2	Switzerland	2	1	0	1	80	76	+4	2
3	Malta	2	0	0	2	64	89	-25	0

Qualified for 1st/4th classification
Qualified for 5th/7th classification

== Group B ==
=== Round 1 ===
Thursday, 12 May 2016	Grenada	87–19	Israel
	Lattysha Cato 55/61 (90%); Cecile Roberts 19/22 (86%); Renisha Stafford 12/13 (92%); Sharon Jeremiah 1/1 (100%)	Report

Thursday, 12 May 2016	Republic of Ireland	56–21	Gibraltar

=== Round 2 ===
Thursday, 12 May 2016	Grenada	82–38	Gibraltar
	Lattysha Cato 78/83 (94%); Cecile Roberts 3/3 (100%); Renisha Stafford 1/1 (100%)	Report

Thursday, 12 May 2016	Republic of Ireland	72–14	Israel

=== Round 3 ===
Friday, 13 May 2016	Grenada	59–53	Republic of Ireland

Friday, 13 May 2016	Gibraltar	51–17	Israel

=== Table ===
Pos	Team	P	W	D	L	GF	GA	GD	Pts
1	Grenada	3	3	0	0	228	110	+118	6
2	Republic of Ireland	3	2	0	1	181	94	+87	4
3	Gibraltar	3	1	0	2	110	155	-45	2
4	Israel	3	0	0	3	50	210	-160	0

Qualified for 1st/4th classification
Qualified for 5th/7th classification

== 5th/7th classification ==
=== Round 1 ===
Saturday, 14 May 2016	Malta	51–35	Israel

=== Round 2 ===
Saturday, 14 May 2016	Malta	31–26	Gibraltar

=== Round 3 ===
Sunday, 15 May 2016	Gibraltar	51–14	Israel

=== Final table ===
Pos	Team	P	W	D	L	GF	GA	GD	Pts
5	Malta	2	2	0	0	82	61	+21	4
6	Gibraltar	2	1	0	1	77	45	+32	2
7	Israel	2	0	0	2	49	102	-53	0

== 1st/4th classification ==
=== Round 1 ===
Sunday, 15 May 2016	Republic of Ireland	44–33	United States

Sunday, 15 May 2016	Grenada	78–24	Switzerland

=== Round 2 ===
Sunday, 15 May 2016	Grenada	73–29	United States

Sunday, 15 May 2016	Republic of Ireland	37–20	Switzerland

=== Final table ===
Pos	Team	P	W	D	L	GF	GA	GD	Pts
1	Grenada	3	3	0	0	210	106	+104	6
2	Republic of Ireland	3	2	0	1	134	112	+22	4
3	United States	3	1	0	2	115	159	-44	2
4	Switzerland	3	0	0	3	86	168	-82	0

Notes

- ^1 The results from the Group A United States v Switzerland and the Group B Grenada v the Republic of Ireland matches were carried over and included in the Final Table.

== Final Placings ==
Rank	Team
1	Grenada
2	Republic of Ireland
3	United States
4	Switzerland
5	Malta
6	Gibraltar
7	Israel
