= 2022 Europe Netball Open Challenge =

International netball tournament

Tournament details
- Host country: Isle of Man
- City: Douglas
- Venue(s): National Sports Centre
- Dates: 12–15 May 2022
- Teams: 8
- TV partner(s): YouTube

Final positions
- Champions: Republic of Ireland
- Runners-up: United Arab Emirates
- Third place: Isle of Man

Tournament statistics
- Matches played: 20

2022 Europe Netball Open Challenge was a second level tournament organised by Europe Netball. It featured eight teams playing a series of netball test matches in May 2022 at the National Sports Centre in Douglas, Isle of Man. The Republic of Ireland finished as overall winners after winning all of their matches. In the final they defeated the United Arab Emirates 55–41. The hosts, the Isle of Man, finished third after defeating Gibraltar 53–31 in a playoff. The tournament was livestreamed on Europe Netball's YouTube channel.

== Group A ==
=== Round 1 ===
| Thursday, 12 May 2022 | Isle of Man | 36–39 | Gibraltar |
| 13.00 |

| Thursday, 12 May 2022 | Cayman Islands | 37–25 | Switzerland |
| 15.00 |

=== Round 2 ===
| Friday, 13 May 2022 | Isle of Man | 59–26 | Cayman Islands |
| 9.00 | | Report |

| Friday, 13 May 2022 | Gibraltar | 72–9 | Switzerland |
| 11.00 |

=== Round 3 ===
| Friday, 13 May 2022 | Isle of Man | 68–25 | Switzerland |
| 17.00 |

| Friday, 13 May 2022 | Gibraltar | 62–26 | Cayman Islands |
| 19.00 |

=== Table ===
| Pos | Team | P | W | D | L | GF | GA | GD | Pts |
|---|---|---|---|---|---|---|---|---|---|
| 1 | Gibraltar | 3 | 3 | 0 | 0 | 173 | 71 | +102 | 6 |
| 2 | Isle of Man | 3 | 2 | 0 | 1 | 163 | 90 | +73 | 4 |
| 3 | Cayman Islands | 3 | 1 | 0 | 2 | 89 | 146 | -57 | 2 |
| 4 | Switzerland | 3 | 0 | 0 | 3 | 59 | 177 | -118 | 0 |

Qualified for Semi-final 2
Qualified for Semi-final 1
Qualified for 5th/8th classification

== Group B ==
=== Round 1 ===
| Thursday, 12 May 2022 | United Arab Emirates | 70–34 | Malta |
| 9.00 |

| Thursday, 12 May 2022 | Republic of Ireland | 86–15 | Israel |
| 11.00 |

=== Round 2 ===
| Thursday, 12 May 2022 | Republic of Ireland | 58–21 | Malta |
| 17.00 |

| Thursday, 12 May 2022 | United Arab Emirates | 85–24 | Israel |
| 19.00 |

=== Round 3 ===
| Friday, 13 May 2022 | Republic of Ireland | 51–44 | United Arab Emirates |
| 13.00 |

| Friday, 13 May 2022 | Malta | 48–26 | Israel |
| 15.00 |

=== Table ===
| Pos | Team | P | W | D | L | GF | GA | GD | Pts |
|---|---|---|---|---|---|---|---|---|---|
| 1 | Republic of Ireland | 3 | 3 | 0 | 0 | 195 | 80 | +115 | 6 |
| 2 | United Arab Emirates | 3 | 2 | 0 | 1 | 199 | 109 | +90 | 4 |
| 3 | Malta | 3 | 1 | 0 | 2 | 103 | 154 | -51 | 2 |
| 4 | Israel | 3 | 0 | 0 | 3 | 65 | 219 | -154 | 2 |

Qualified for Semi-final 2
Qualified for Semi-final 1
Qualified for 5th/8th classification

== Classification ==
5th/8th classification
Saturday, 14 May 2022
Cayman Islands | 45
Israel | 21
Saturday, 14 May 2022
Malta | 57
Switzerland | 34

5th/6th playoff
Sunday, 15 May 2022
Malta | 47
Cayman Islands | 35
7th/8th playoff
Saturday, 14 May 2022
Israel | 37
Switzerland | 28

=== 5th/8th classification ===
| Saturday, 14 May 2022 | Cayman Islands | 45–21 | Israel |
| 9.00 |

| Saturday, 14 May 2022 | Malta | 57–34 | Switzerland |
| 11.00 |

=== 7th/8th playoff ===
| Saturday, 14 May 2022 | Israel | 37–28 | Switzerland |
| 17.00 |

=== 5th/6th playoff ===
| Sunday, 15 May 2022 | Malta | 47–35 | Cayman Islands |
| 9.00 |

== Playoffs ==
Semi-finals
Saturday, 14 May 2022
Isle of Man | 32
Republic of Ireland | 43
Saturday, 14 May 2022
United Arab Emirates | 58
Gibraltar | 38

Final
Sunday, 15 May 2022
Republic of Ireland | 55
United Arab Emirates | 41
3rd/4th playoff
Sunday, 15 May 2022
Isle of Man | 53
Gibraltar | 31

=== Semi-final 1 ===
| Saturday, 14 May 2022 | Isle of Man | 32–43 | Republic of Ireland |
| 13.00 | | Report |

=== Semi-final 2 ===
| Saturday, 14 May 2022 | United Arab Emirates | 58–38 | Gibraltar |
| 15.00 | | Report |

=== 3rd/4th playoff ===
| Sunday, 15 May 2022 | Isle of Man | 53–31 | Gibraltar |
| 11.00 | | Report |

=== Final ===
| Sunday, 15 May 2022 | Republic of Ireland | 55–41 | United Arab Emirates |
| 13.00 | | Report |

== Final Placings ==
| Rank | Team |
|---|---|
| 1 | Republic of Ireland |
| 2 | United Arab Emirates |
| 3 | Isle of Man |
| 4 | Gibraltar |
| 5 | Malta |
| 6 | Cayman Islands |
| 7 | Israel |
| 8 | Switzerland |
