= Sara Hale =

Wales netball international and head coach

Personal information
- Full name: Sara-Louise Moore (née Hale)
- Born: 7 October 1982 (age 43)
- Height: 1.76 m (5 ft 9 in)
- Spouse: Steve Moore
- Relative: Andy Moore (brother-in-law)
- University: University of Wales Institute Cardiff

Netball career
- Playing positions: GK, GD, WD
Years	Club team	Apps
2002–2008	UWIC	
2005–2014	Celtic Dragons	
2014	Manchester Thunder	
Years	National team	Caps
2002–2014	Wales	81
Coaching career
- Years: Team
- 2020–2023: Wales

Sara Hale (born 7 October 1982), also known as Sara-Louise Hale or Sara Moore, is a former Wales netball international and national team head coach. Between 2002 and 2014 she made 81 senior appearances for Wales. She represented Wales at the 2002 and 2006 Commonwealth Games and at the 2003 and 2007 World Netball Championships. She co-captained Wales at the 2011 World Netball Championships. In the Netball Super League, she played for Celtic Dragons and Manchester Thunder. Between 2020 and 2023, she served as head coach of Wales. She was Wales head coach at the 2022 Commonwealth Games and when they won the 2023 Netball World Cup Regional Qualifier for Europe.

== Early life, education and academic career ==
Sara-Louise Hale is originally from Abergavenny. Between 2002 and 2008 she attended Cardiff Metropolitan University, at the time known as the University of Wales Institute Cardiff. During this time she obtained a Bachelor of Science in Sport and Physical Education and a Master of Science in Performance Analysis. Hale subsequently held senior leadership roles and gained further qualifications at several universities in England, including the University of the West of England, the University Campus of Football Business and the University of Bath.

University	Years	
University of Wales Institute Cardiff	2001–2004	BSc Sport and Physical Education
University of Wales Institute Cardiff	2004–2007	Lecturer
University of Wales Institute Cardiff	2005–2008	MSc Performance Analysis
University of Bath	2007–2009	Lecturer in Sports Development and Sports Performance
University of Huddersfield	2010–2012	Graduate Diploma in Law
University of Central Lancashire	2012–2013	Lecturer in Sports Development and Performance
University Campus of Football Business	2013–2018	Programme Leader in Sports Law and Business
University of London	2017–2018	Postgraduate Certificate in Sports Law
University of London	2018–2021	Postgraduate Diploma in International Business Law
University of South Wales	2018–2019	Academic Manager for Law
University of the West of England	2019–2021	Deputy Head of Department, Bristol Law School

== Playing career ==
=== Celtic Dragons ===
Between 2005 and 2013, Hale played for Celtic Dragons in the Netball Super League. In 2005, she was a founding member of the Dragons team. She was a member the Dragons team that finished as runners up in the 2013 Netball Superleague, losing 62–56 to Team Bath in the grand final.

=== Manchester Thunder ===
Ahead of the 2014 Netball Superleague season, Hale joined Manchester Thunder. However, in March 2014, during a match against Hertfordshire Mavericks, she suffered a season ending ACL injury. Between 2015 and 2018, Hale served as a member of Thunder's coaching staff, working with Tracey Neville and Liana Leota. She initially worked as a defensive coach.

=== Wales ===
Between 2002 and 2014, Hale made 81 senior appearances for Wales. She played for an Emerging Wales team at the 2002 FENA Open. On 26 July 2002, Hale made her senior debut for Wales against Sri Lanka at the 2002 Commonwealth Games. She subsequently went on to represent Wales at the 2006 Commonwealth Games and at the 2003, 2007 and 2011 World Netball Championships. At a 2011 World Netball Championships Qualifier she became only the seventh Wales netball international to make her 50th senior appearance. Alongside Suzy Drane, she co-captained Wales at the 2011 World Netball Championships. She was a member of the Wales teams that won the 2010 Netball Singapore Nations Cup and the 2013 Netball Europe Open Championship. On 27 February 2014, she made her final appearance for Wales in the Northern Cup final win against Scotland. Out of 81 games Hale drew 1, won 46 and lost 34, giving her a win rate of 56.79%.

Tournaments	Place
2002 FENA Open	
2002 Commonwealth Games	6th
2003 FENA Open	
2003 World Netball Championships	14th
2004 FENA Open	
2005 FENA Open	2nd
2006 FENA Open	2nd
2006 Commonwealth Games	8th
2007 World Netball Championships Qualifiers	1st
2007 World Netball Championships	12th
2008 FENA Open	4th
2009 Netball Europe Open Championship	
2010 Netball Europe Open Championship	2nd
2011 World Netball Championships Qualifier – Europe	2nd
2010 Netball Singapore Nations Cup	1st
2011 Netball Europe Open Championship	2nd
2011 World Netball Championships	9th
2012 Netball Europe Open Championship	3rd
2013 Netball Europe Open Championship	1st
2014 Northern Cup	1st

== Coaching career ==
=== England ===
Between 2016 and 2018, Hale served as an assistant coach to Tracey Neville with England, including at the 2016 Netball Quad Series.

=== Wales ===
Between 2018 and 2020, Hale served as an assistant coach to Wales head coach, Julie Hoornweg. During this time Wales were runners up at the 2019 Netball Europe Open Championships and finished 2019 seven matches undefeated. In February 2020, Hale succeeded Hoornweg as Wales head coach. Under Hale's leadership, Wales won the 2022 Wendy White Trophy Series, qualified for the 2022 Commonwealth Games via the World Netball Rankings and eventually finished 8th at the main tournament itself. She was also head coach when Wales won the 2023 Netball World Cup Regional Qualifier for Europe.

Tournaments	Place
2022 Wendy White Trophy Series	1st
2022 Commonwealth Games	8th
2023 Netball World Cup Regional Qualifier – Europe	1st

== Administrator ==
In November 2022, Hale, now known as Sara Moore, was appointed Head of Elite for Performance at Wales Netball. This role involved overseeing both the Wales national netball team and the Celtic Dragons franchise. One of her of earliest tasks was to recruit a new Wales head coach. She remained in this role until June 2025.

== Personal life ==
In March 2013, it was reported that Hale had a brief relationship with the then Sheffield Wednesday manager, Dave Jones. Since 2021, she has been married to the former Wales rugby union international, Steve Moore.

== Honours ==
=== Player ===
Wales

- Netball Europe Open Championships
  - Winners: 2013
- Netball Singapore Nations Cup
  - Winners: 2010
- Netball World Cup Qualifiers
  - Winners: 2007

Celtic Dragons

- Netball Superleague
  - Runners Up: 2013

=== Coach ===
Wales

- Netball World Cup Qualifiers
  - Winners: 2023
