= 2023 Netball World Cup Regional Qualifier – Europe =

International netball competition hosted by Scotland

Tournament details
- Host country: Scotland
- City: Glasgow
- Venue: Emirates Arena
- Dates: 12–16 October 2022
- Teams: 6

Final positions
- Champions: Wales (3rd title)
- Runners-up: Scotland
- Third place: Northern Ireland

Tournament statistics
- Matches played: 15

The 2023 Netball World Cup Regional Qualifier – Europe was a tournament organised by Europe Netball. It featured six teams playing a series of netball test matches in October 2022 at Glasgow's Emirates Arena. The hosts Scotland were joined by Gibraltar, the Isle of Man, Northern Ireland, the Republic of Ireland and Wales. The top two from these six teams would qualify for the 2023 Netball World Cup. England, had already qualified for the 2023 Netball World Cup via the World Netball Rankings. After winning all four of their matches in Rounds 1 to 4, Scotland and Wales had already secured their qualification before they were due to play each other in Round 5. With a team co-captained by Suzy Drane and Nia Jones and coached by Sara Moore, Wales won the series after defeating Scotland 58–51 in the final match.

== Squads ==
Participating teams and rosters
Gibraltar	Isle of Man	Northern Ireland	Republic of Ireland	Scotland	Wales
Mia Evie-Rowe; Courtney Ferrer; Iris Hartman; Anna Hernandez; Chloe Hernandez; Zainya Gillingwater (vc); Isabella MacQuisten; Janice Moreno; Joelle Moreno (c); Amy Pozo; Megan Ruiz; Mae Truman-Davies	Alice Cross; Becca Cooke; Rhian Evans; Ashley Hall (c); Aalish Harris; Rachel Johnstone (vc); Kat Keeling; Zoe Kirkham; Cassidy Pizzey; Lydia Shaw; Paige Skillicorn; Natalie Swales; Reserves: Holly Hennessy; Eliana Kneen; Kenzie Pizzey	Niamh Cooper; Ciara Crosbie; Michelle Drayne; Rachel Duckers; Frances Keenan; Caroline O'Hanlon (c); Michelle Magee; Alex Martin; Olivia McDonald; Orla McGeough; Georgie McGrath; Orlaith Rogers; Sarah Russell; Fionnuala Toner (vc)	Beth Brennan; Amy Caporn; Millie Cox; Fran Duffy (c); Natalie Foster; Katie Gerrard; Ciara Lynch; Corey McGlynn; Helen Monaghan; Sophie Murray; Eimhear O'Prey; Erin Peters (vc); Seren Redmond; Eryn Salako; Aisling Sullivan-Sweeney	Emma Barrie; Kelly Boyle; Cerys Cairns; Iona Christian; Rachel Conway; Bethan Goodwin; Hannah Grant; Hannah Leighton; Claire Maxwell (c); Niamh McCall; Emily Nicholl (vc); Lauren Tait; Reserves: Chloe Carchrie; Emma Love; Sarah MacPhail	Suzy Drane (cc); Bethan Dyke; Lucy Howells; Clare Jones (vc); Nia Jones (cc); Shona O'Dwyer; Ella Powell-Davies (vc); Georgia Rowe; Christina Shaw; Eleanor Watkins; Sarie Watkins; Phillipa Yarranton; Reserves: Celyn Emanuel; Holly Jones; Caris Morgan
Head Coach: Sarah Payas	Head Coach: Claire Battye	Head Coach: Elaine Rice	Head Coach: Teresa Gillespie	Head Coach: Tamsin Greenway	Head Coach: Sara Moore
Assistant Coach : Denise Ellis	Assistant Coach: Robert McKee	Assistant Coach: Hannah Willis	Assistant Coach: Una Barrett	Assistant Coach: Sara Francis-Bayman	Assistant Coach: Emily Handyside

== Milestones ==
- On 14 October 2022, Fionnuala Toner made her 100th appearance for Northern Ireland against Scotland.
- On 16 October 2022, Suzy Drane made her 125th and final appearance for Wales against Scotland.

== Match officials ==
Umpires

Umpire	Association
Louise Cole	England
Rhian Edwards	Wales
Kate Mann	England
Leonard Masao	South Africa
Rachael Radford	England
Kate Stephenson	England
James Thomas	England

Umpire Appointments Panel

Umpire	Association
Cheryl Danson	England
Margaret Deighan	England

== Matches ==
=== Round 1 ===
Wednesday, 12 October 2022	Wales	78–22	Isle of Man
14.30

Wednesday, 12 October 2022	Northern Ireland	68–19	Gibraltar
17.00

Wednesday, 12 October 2022	Scotland	87–17	Republic of Ireland
19.30

=== Round 2 ===
Thursday, 13 October 2022	Wales	95–19	Gibraltar
12.00

Thursday, 13 October 2022	Northern Ireland	59–24	Republic of Ireland
14.30

Thursday, 13 October 2022	Scotland	82–20	Isle of Man
17.00

=== Round 3 ===
Friday, 14 October 2022	Wales	75–23	Republic of Ireland
12.00

Friday, 14 October 2022	Isle of Man	43–33	Gibraltar
14.30

Friday, 14 October 2022	Scotland	65–38	Northern Ireland
17.00

=== Round 4 ===
Saturday, 15 October 2022	Isle of Man	54–53	Republic of Ireland
12.00

Saturday, 15 October 2022	Wales	60–34	Northern Ireland
14.30

Saturday, 15 October 2022	Scotland	91–18	Gibraltar
17.00

=== Round 5 ===
Sunday, 16 October 2022	Republic of Ireland	50–36	Gibraltar
10.00

Sunday, 16 October 2022	Northern Ireland	61–32	Isle of Man
12.30

Sunday, 16 October 2022	Scotland	51–58	Wales
15.00

== Final table ==
Pos	Team	P	W	D	L	GF	GA	GD	Pts
1	Wales	5	5	0	0	366	149	+217	10
2	Scotland	5	4	0	1	376	151	+225	8
3	Northern Ireland	5	3	0	2	260	200	+60	6
4	Isle of Man	5	2	0	3	171	307	-136	4
5	Republic of Ireland	5	1	0	4	167	311	-144	2
6	Gibraltar	5	0	0	5	125	347	-222	0

Qualified for 2023 Netball World Cup
