= 2014 Netball Europe Open Championships =

International netball series hosted by Wales

Tournament details
- Host country: Wales
- City: Cardiff
- Dates: 30 May–1 June 2014
- Teams: 4

Final positions
- Champions: Wales
- Runners-up: Scotland
- Third place: Northern Ireland

Tournament statistics
- Matches played: 6

The 2014 Netball Europe Open Championships was a tournament organised by Netball Europe. It featured four teams playing a series of netball test matches in May and June 2014 in Cardiff. The tournament also served as a European qualifier for the 2015 Netball World Cup. The hosts Wales were joined by Northern Ireland, the Republic of Ireland and Scotland. England qualified for the World Cup via the INF World Rankings and did not take part. With a team captained by Suzy Drane and coached by Laura Williams, Wales retained the title after winning all three of their matches. Wales and Scotland subsequently joined England at the World Cup.

== Squads ==
Participating teams and rosters
Northern Ireland	Republic of Ireland	Scotland	Wales
Niamh Cooper; Michelle Drayne; Gemma Gibney; Noleen Lennon; Nordia Masters; Lisa McCaffrey; Oonagh McCullough; Caroline O'Hanlon; Lisa Somerville; Fionnuala Toner; Máire Toner; Hannah Willis (c)			Suzy Drane (c); Bethan Dyke; Nichola James; Rebecca James; Kyra Jones; Nia Jones; Chelsea Lewis; Kelly Morgan; Cara Lea Moseley (vc); Stephanie Myddelton; Ursula Pritchard; Leanne Thomas
Head Coach: Kate Carpenter	Head Coach:	Head Coach:	Head Coach: Laura Williams

== Debuts ==
- On 30 May 2014, Bethan Dyke made her senior debut for Wales against the Republic of Ireland.

== Matches ==
=== Round 1 ===
30 May 2014	Scotland	45–44	Northern Ireland

30 May 2014	Wales	74–17	Republic of Ireland
		Report

=== Round 2 ===
31 May 2014	Northern Ireland	84–25	Republic of Ireland

31 May 2014	Wales	41–38	Scotland
		Report

=== Round 3 ===
1 June 2014	Scotland	79–19	Republic of Ireland

1 June 2014	Wales	51–43	Northern Ireland
		Report

== Final table ==
Pos	Team	P	W	D	L	GF	GA	GD	Pts
1	Wales	3	3	0	0	166	98	+68	6
2	Scotland	3	2	0	1	162	104	+58	4
3	Northern Ireland	3	1	0	2	171	121	+50	2
4	Republic of Ireland	3	0	0	3	61	237	-176	0

Qualified for the 2015 Netball World Cup
