= 2015 Netball Europe Open Championships =

International netball tournament

Tournament details
- Host country: Northern Ireland
- City: Belfast
- Venue: Antrim Forum
- Dates: 14–17 May 2015
- Teams: 6
- TV partner: QTV Sports/StreamUK

Final positions
- Champions: England
- Runners-up: South Africa
- Third place: Wales

Tournament statistics
- Matches played: 15

The 2015 Netball Europe Open Championships was a tournament organised by Netball Europe. It featured six teams playing a series of netball test matches in May 2015 at Belfast's Antrim Forum. They included six of the top 12 ranked teams, including the hosts, Northern Ireland, England, Scotland and Wales plus guest teams, South Africa and Trinidad and Tobago. The second level tournament, the 2015 Netball Europe Open Challenge was played alongside the main event. With a team coached by Tracey Neville and captained by Pamela Cookey, England were confirmed as the main open tournament winners after defeating Northern Ireland 64–22 in their final match. Cookey was also named player of the tournament. South Africa finished second after defeating Trinidad and Tobago. All matches were livestreamed by QTV Sports/StreamUK with Alison Mitchell as the lead commentator.

== Squads ==
Participating teams and rosters
England	Northern Ireland	Scotland	South Africa	Trinidad and Tobago	Wales
Sara Bayman; Sally Butters; Sam Cook; Pamela Cookey (c); Kadeen Corbin; Rachel Dunn; Stacey Francis; Tamsin Greenway; Layla Guscoth; Helen Housby; Laura Malcolm; Sonia Mkoloma	Jeana Bowman; Kyla Bowman; Lisa Bowman; Niamh Cooper; Ciara Crosbie; Michelle Drayne; Gemma Gibney (c); Deborah McCarthy; Sarah Montgomery; Caroline O'Hanlon; Fionnuala Toner; Neamh Woods	Claire Brownie; Bex Campbell; Racheal Forbes; Lynsey Gallagher; Bethan Goodwin; Fiona Moore-McGrath; June McNeill; Hayley Mulheron; Samantha Murphy; Gemma Sole; Bethany Sutherland; Fiona Themann	Erin Burger; Lauren-Lee Christians; Maryka Holtzhausen (c); Mari-Lena Joubert; Rochelle Lawson; Izette Lubbe; Phumza Maweni; Precious Mthembu; Melissa Myburgh; Adele Niemand; Shadine van der Merwe	Amanda Cameron; Kielle Connelly; Joelisa Cooper (cc); Kemba Duncan; Candice Guerero (cc); Rhonda John-Davis; Onella Jack; Kalifa McCollin; Afeisha Noel; Jellene Richardson; Daystar Swift; Samantha Wallace	Sara Bell; Fern Davies; Suzy Drane; Bethan Dyke; Nichola James; Kyra Jones; Lateisha Kidner; Chelsea Lewis; Kelly Morgan; Rosie Pretorious; Georgia Rowe; Emma Thomas
Head Coach: Tracey Neville	Head Coach: Elaine Rice	Head Coach: Gail Parata	Head Coach: Bennie Saayman	Head Coach: Wesley Gomes	Head Coach: Trish Wilcox

== Debuts and milestones ==
- On 14 May 2015, Sasha Corbin made her 50th senior England appearance in the match against Trinidad and Tobago.
- On 16 May 2015, Stacey Francis made her 50th senior England appearance in the match against Wales.
- On 17 May 2015, Shadine van der Merwe made her senior debut for South Africa against Trinidad and Tobago.

== Matches ==
=== Day 1 ===
14 May 2015	England	63–42	Trinidad and Tobago
10:30

14 May 2015	South Africa	45–34	Scotland
12:30

14 May 2015	Northern Ireland	53–53	Wales
14:30	Lisa Bowman 43/50 (86%)

14 May 2015	England	69–33	South Africa
18:30

=== Day 2 ===
15 May 2015	Northern Ireland	40–31	Scotland
10:30

15 May 2015	Wales	53–46	Trinidad and Tobago
12:30

15 May 2015	England	60–16	Scotland
16:30

15 May 2015	Northern Ireland	47–57	South Africa
18:30

=== Day 3 ===
16 May 2015	Scotland	45–42	Trinidad and Tobago
10:30

16 May 2015	England	69–32	Wales
12:30

16 May 2015	Northern Ireland	42–50	Trinidad and Tobago
16:30

16 May 2015	South Africa	72-42	Wales
18:30

=== Day 4 ===
17 May 2015	South Africa	46–42	Trinidad and Tobago
8:30

17 May 2015	Wales	43–28	Scotland
10:30

17 May 2015	Northern Ireland	22–64	England
12:30

== Final table ==
Pos	Team	P	W	D	L	GF	GA	GD	Pts
1	England	5	5	0	0	325	145	+180	10
2	South Africa	5	4	0	1	253	234	+19	8
3	Wales	5	2	1	2	223	268	-45	5
4	Northern Ireland	5	1	1	3	204	255	-51	3
5	Trinidad and Tobago	5	1	0	4	222	249	-27	2
6	Scotland	5	1	0	4	154	230	-76	2
