= Ursula Pritchard =

Wales netball international

Personal information
- Full name: Ursula Pritchard (née Bowers)
- Born: 29 June 1978 (age 48) Wrexham, Wales
- Height: 1.81 m (5 ft 11 in)

Netball career
- Playing positions: WD, GD, GK, C
Years	Club team	Apps
1990s	Deeside Netball Club	
2001	Canterbury Flames	
2002–2006	Hucclecote	
2002–2007	Team Bath	
2008–2011	Bay of Plenty NPC	
2014–	Team Bath	
Years	National team	Caps
1999–2014	Wales	74

Ursula Pritchard, originally known as Ursula Bowers and also known as Billy Bowers, is a former Wales netball international. She captained Wales at the 2006 Commonwealth Games and 2007 World Netball Championships. She also represented Wales at the 1999 and 2003 World Netball Championships and at the 2002 and 2014 Commonwealth Games. At club level, she captained Team Bath when they won the 2004 Super Cup and the 2005–06 and 2006–07 Netball Superleague titles.

== Playing career ==
=== Early years ===
In her youth and early career Bowers, played for several teams and regions including Deeside Netball Club, Central, North East Wales, and Hucclecote.

=== Canterbury Flames ===
After playing for Wales in the 1999 World Netball Championships, hosted in Christchurch, Bowers opted to move to New Zealand. In 2001, she played for Canterbury Flames, helping them finish as runners-up in the Coca-Cola Cup league. In 2002 she returned to play for Wales at the 2002 Commonwealth Games.

=== Team Bath ===
Between 2002 and 2007, Bowers played for Team Bath, initially in the Super Cup and later in the Netball Superleague. She played in four of the five Super Cup campaigns and in 2003, she became Team Bath captain. She went onto captain them when they won the 2004 Super Cup and the 2005–06 and 2006–07 Netball Superleague titles. After returning from her second spell in New Zealand, Bowers, now Pritchard, rejoined Team Bath as a member of the coaching team for the 2013 season. She was then included in the playing squad for the 2014 season.

=== Bay of Plenty NPC ===
After playing for Wales in the 2007 World Netball Championships, hosted in West Auckland, Bowers again opted to move to New Zealand. In August 2008 she married Ben Pritchard and the newlyweds settled in Tauranga. Between 2008 and 2011, she represented Bay of Plenty in Netball New Zealand's National Provincial Championship.

=== Wales ===
Between 1999 and 2014, Bowers made 74 senior appearances for Wales. On 30 January 1999, she made her senior debut for Wales against England. She had previously represented Wales at under-16, under-18 and under-21 levels. She subsequently represented Wales at the 1999 and 2003 World Netball Championships and at the 2002 Commonwealth Games. She captained Wales at the 2006 Commonwealth Games and 2007 World Netball Championships. After returning from New Zealand, Bowers, now Pritchard, played for Wales at the 2014 Netball Europe Open Championships, helping them win the tournament and qualify for the 2015 Netball World Cup. On 1 August 2014, Pritchard made her final appearance for Wales at the 2014 Commonwealth Games in a match against Northern Ireland. In 74 matches, Pritchard won 38 and lost 36 with a win rate of 51.35%.

Tournaments	Matches played	Place
1999 FENA Open	4	
1999 World Netball Championships	9	14th
2002 FENA Open	^{(Note 1)}	
2002 Commonwealth Games	6	6th
2003 FENA Open	3	
2003 World Netball Championships	8	14th
2004 FENA Open	3	
2005 FENA Open		2nd
2006 FENA Open		2nd
2006 Commonwealth Games	6	8th
2007 FENA Open		2nd
2007 World Netball Championships	6	12th
2014 Netball Europe Open Championships	3	1st
2014 Commonwealth Games	6	8th

Notes

- ^1 Bowers played for an Emerging Wales.

== Honours ==
Team Bath

- Netball Superleague
  - Winners: 2005–06, 2006–07
- Super Cup
  - Winners: 2004: 1

Wales

- Netball Europe Open Championships
  - Winners: 2014: 1
