= 2019 Netball Europe Open Championships =

International netball tournament

Tournament details
- Host country: Northern Ireland
- City: Belfast
- Venue: Antrim Forum
- Dates: 27–29 September 2019
- Teams: 4
- TV partner: YouTube

Final positions
- Champions: England
- Runners-up: Wales
- Third place: Northern Ireland

Tournament statistics
- Matches played: 6

The 2019 Netball Europe Open Championships was a tournament organised by Netball Europe. It featured four teams playing a series of netball test matches in September 2019 at Belfast's Antrim Forum. The hosts Northern Ireland were joined by England, the Republic of Ireland and Wales. Scotland decided not to enter the tournament, citing concerns about "athlete wellbeing" following a "demanding season" which saw them compete in the 2019 Netball World Cup and as Strathclyde Sirens in the 2019 Netball Superleague. During the tournament Wales held England to a 51–51 draw. This saw Wales and England finish level with five points. However, with a team captained by Yasmin Parsons and coached by Sam Bird, England were declared the winners due to a better goal average, 1.704 to 1.622. Wales finished second following a 91–24 win over the Republic of Ireland. This saw them finish 2019 on a run of seven matches undefeated. Wales' Kyra Jones was named Player of the Tournament. The series was streamed live on Netball Europe's YouTube channel.

== Squads ==
Participating teams and rosters
England	Northern Ireland	Republic of Ireland	Wales
Halimat Adio; Rebekah Airey; Iona Christian (cc); Zara Everitt (vc); Funmi Fadoju; Ally Housley; Berri Neil; Jasmin Odeogberin; Yasmin Parsons (cc); Emilia Roscoe; Kira Rothwell; Sienna Rushton	Lisa Bowman; Niamh Cooper; Shaunagh Craig; Ciara Crosbie; Michelle Drayne; Frances Keenan; Emma Magee; Michelle Magee; Lisa McCaffrey; Rebecca McCullough; Caroline O'Hanlon (c); Fionnuala Toner (vc)		Suzy Drane (c); Bethan Dyke; Lydia Hitchings; Lucy Howells; Clare Jones; Kyra Jones; Nia Jones; Chelsea Lewis; Eleanor Roberts; Georgia Rowe; Christina Shaw; Leila Thomas
Head Coach: Sam Bird	Head Coach: Dan Ryan	Head Coach:	Head Coach: Julie Hoornweg
Assistant Coach: Emily Perry	Assistant Coach:	Assistant Coach:	Assistant Coach: Jenna Adamson; Sara Hale

== Matches ==
=== Round 1 ===
Friday, 27 September 2019	England	73–16	Republic of Ireland
14.00

Friday, 27 September 2019	Northern Ireland	44–51	Wales
15.30		Report

=== Round 2 ===
Saturday, 28 September 2019	Wales	51–51	England
11.30		Report

Saturday, 28 September 2019	Northern Ireland	53–19	Republic of Ireland
13.30

=== Round 3 ===
Sunday, 29 September 2019	Wales	91–24	Republic of Ireland
9.30		Report

Sunday, 29 September 2019	Northern Ireland	41–60	England
11.30

== Final table ==
Pos	Team	P	W	D	L	GF	GA	GD	Pts
1	England	3	2	1	0	184	108	+76	5
2	Wales	3	2	1	0	193	119	+74	5
3	Northern Ireland	3	1	0	2	138	130	-8	2
4	Republic of Ireland	3	0	0	3	59	217	-158	0
