= 2013 Netball Superleague Grand Final =

Netball Superleague grand final

- Event: 2013 Netball Superleague season
Team Bath	Celtic Dragons
62	56
- Team Bath win their fifth title and Celtic Dragons make their grand final debut.
- Date: 25 May 2013
- Venue: University of Worcester Arena, Worcester
- Attendance: 1,506

The 2013 Netball Superleague Grand Final featured Team Bath and Celtic Dragons. Team Bath secured their fifth Netball Superleague title in eight years with a victory over Dragons. Dragons, who were playing their first grand final won the second quarter by two points to lead 31–30 at half-time. However Team Bath fought back and entered the final quarter with a two-point advantage at 46–44. Although Dragons kept themselves in the game with three successive goals, Team Bath stretched clear in the final two minutes to win it.

== Match summary ==
25 May 2013	Team Bath	62–56	Celtic Dragons	University of Worcester Arena, Worcester; Attendance: 1,506; Umpires: Gary Burgess and Tracy Smith	Sky Sports
25 May 2013	Scoring by quarter: 16–15, 30–31, 46–44, 62–56			University of Worcester Arena, Worcester; Attendance: 1,506; Umpires: Gary Burgess and Tracy Smith	Sky Sports
25 May 2013	Pamela Cookey 37/41 (90%); Kadeen Corbin 25/38 (66%)		Lottysha Cato 54/58 (93%); Cara Moseley 2/4	University of Worcester Arena, Worcester; Attendance: 1,506; Umpires: Gary Burgess and Tracy Smith	Sky Sports

== Teams ==
Head Coach: Jess Thirlby; Assistant Coach: Denise Ellis Starting 7: GS Kadeen Corbin; GA Pamela Cookey; WA Asha Francis (c); C Mia Ritchie; WD Serena Guthrie; GD Stacey Francis; GK Sam Cook Bench: GA/GS Shaunagh Craig; GK/GD Sophie Masterson; C/WA Yasmin Parsons; GK/GD Gemma Stewart; WA/C Amanda Trounce	Head Coach: Melissa Hyndman Starting 7: GS Lottysha Cato; GA Cara Moseley; WA Suzy Drane (c); C Krya Jones; WD Nicola James; GD Stephanie Williams; GK Sara Hale Bench: C/WA Bethan Dyke; GD/WD Nia Jones; GS/GA Chelsea Lewis; GD/WD/GK Jenna Murie; WA/GS/GA Emma Thomas
