= Europe Netball Open Challenge =

International netball competition

- Sport: Netball
- Founded: 2008
- First season: 2008
- Organising body: Europe Netball
- Most recent champion: Northern Ireland
- Most titles: Republic of Ireland
- Broadcaster: YouTube
- Related competitions: Netball World Cup Qualifiers – Europe; Netball Europe Open Championships

The Europe Netball Open Challenge is an international netball tournament organised by Europe Netball. It was originally known as the European Netball Festival and later as the Netball Europe Open Challenge. It mainly features second level national netball teams affiliated to Europe Netball. It has also included guest teams from outside Europe. Europe's top level teams play in the Netball Europe Open Championships. The Republic of Ireland are the competition's most successful team. Other winners have included Grenada, the Isle of Man, Northern Ireland and the United Arab Emirates.

== History ==
=== European Netball Festival ===
The Open Challenge evolved from Netball Festivals played in 2008, 2010 and 2012. The Republic of Ireland hosted the 2008 festival. Other participants included Gibraltar and Israel. The 2010 Festival was won by a Great Britain U19 team.

Tournaments	Winners	Runners up	3rd	4th	5th	6th
2008						
2010	Great Britain U19	Republic of Ireland	Malta	Israel	Gibraltar	Sweden
2012	Republic of Ireland	Malta	Gibraltar	Switzerland	Israel	

=== Netball Europe Open Challenge ===
The 2013, 2015 and 2016 tournaments were played alongside the Netball Europe Open Championships.

Tournaments	Winners	Runners up	3rd	4th	5th	6th
2013	Republic of Ireland	Switzerland	Gibraltar			
2015	Republic of Ireland	Switzerland	Malta			
2016	Grenada	Republic of Ireland	United States	Switzerland	Malta	Gibraltar
2017	Republic of Ireland	Gibraltar	Bermuda	Israel		
2018	Republic of Ireland	Isle of Man	UAE	Gibraltar	Israel	
2019	Isle of Man^{1}	Gibraltar	Republic of Ireland	UAE	Israel	Cayman Islands

=== Europe Netball Open Challenge ===
Tournaments	Winners	Runners up	3rd	4th	5th	6th
2021	UAE	Isle of Man	Malta	Gibraltar	Switzerland	Northern Ireland^{2}
2022	Republic of Ireland	UAE	Isle of Man	Gibraltar	Malta	Cayman Islands
2023	UAE	Republic of Ireland	Isle of Man	Malta	Gibraltar	France
2024	Northern Ireland	UAE	Republic of Ireland	Isle of Man	Gibraltar	France

Notes

- ^1 The 2019 tournament also featured a British Armed Forces team. They were effectively the overall winner, after winning all their games during the series.
- ^2 At the 2021 tournament, Northern Ireland also played a series of separate matches against Gibraltar and the Isle of Man. Northern Ireland did not compete in the tournament.
- ^3 The 2025 tournament was cancelled. After the Palestine Solidarity Campaign objected to Israel competing, Europe Netball decided to cancel the whole tournament.
