= Suzy Drane =

Wales netball international

Personal information
- Full name: Suzanne Drane
- Born: 27 November 1986 (age 39) St Asaph, Wales
- Height: 1.72 m (5 ft 8 in)
- School: Rydal Penrhos; Christleton High School
- University: University of Wales Institute Cardiff

Netball career
- Playing positions: C, WD, WA
Years	Club team	Apps
1997–2004	Chester Netball Club	
2004–2008	UWIC	
2005–2019	Celtic Dragons	
2017	→ Celtic Flames	
2019–	Team Bath Toucans	
Years	National team	Caps
2005–2022	Wales	125

Suzy Drane is a former Wales netball international. She captained Wales at the 2011 World Netball Championships and the 2015 Netball World Cup and at the 2014, 2018 and 2022 Commonwealth Games. She also represented Wales at the 2006 Commonwealth Games. Between 2005 and 2019, she played for Celtic Dragons in the Netball Superleague. She captained Dragons when they finished as runners up in the 2013 Netball Superleague. Since 2018, she has worked as a Senior Lecturer in Sport Development at Cardiff Metropolitan University. In September 2023, Drane became the third netball player to be inducted into the Welsh Sports Hall of Fame.

== Early life, education and academic career ==
Between 1989 and 1997, Drane attended Rydal Penrhos. Between 1997 and 2004 she attended Christleton High School, after her family moved from Llandudno to Waverton, Cheshire. Between 2004 and 2015, she attended Cardiff Metropolitan University. When she first started studying, the university was known as the University of Wales Institute Cardiff. The university subsequently changed its name while she was completing her studies. During this time she gained a BSc in Sport Development, a MSc in Sport Physical Activity and Health, a Post Graduate Certificate in Teaching in Higher Education and a Doctorate in Sport. Since 2018, she has worked as a Senior Lecturer in Sport Development at Cardiff Metropolitan University. In July 2018, Drane was awarded an Honorary Fellowship by the NPTC Group of Colleges. Since 2023, she has served as a board member and chair with Commonwealth Games Wales.

== Playing career ==
=== Early years ===
In 1997, aged 11, Drane began playing for Chester Netball Club. She continued playing for the club until 2004. Between 2004 and 2008 she played for University of Wales Institute Cardiff. She also represented Cheshire at under-17, under-19 and under-21 levels.

=== Celtic Dragons ===
Between 2005 and 2019, Drane played for Celtic Dragons in the Netball Superleague. In 2005, she was a founding member of the Dragons team. She captained Dragons for eight seasons. She was captain when Dragons finished as runners up in the 2013 Netball Superleague, losing 62–56 to Team Bath in the grand final. She also captained Dragons when they played as Celtic Flames in the 2017 Netball New Zealand Super Club. In October 2019, Drane announced she was leaving Dragons.

=== Team Bath Toucans ===
In 2019, Drane joined Team Bath Toucans, Team Bath's England Netball Premier League team.

=== Wales ===
Between 2005 and 2022, Drane made 125 senior appearances for Wales. On 23 June 2005, she made her senior debut for Wales against Jamaica. She had previously represented Wales at under-17, under-19 and under-21 levels. She subsequently represented Wales at the 2006 Commonwealth Games. She first captained Wales in 2010 and went onto captain and/or co-captain Wales at the 2011 World Netball Championships and the 2015 Netball World Cup and at the 2014, 2018 and 2022 Commonwealth Games. In May 2016, Drane made her 75th senior appearance for Wales at the 2016 Netball Europe Open Championships. On 9 July 2019, she made her 100th senior appearance in a 72–53 win over Grenada. On 20 July 2022, during a home test series, against South Africa, Drane made her 112th senior appearance for Wales, surpassing Helen Weston to become the most capped Wales netball international. On 16 October 2022, she made her 125th and final appearance for Wales against Scotland in a 2023 Netball World Cup qualifier. Out of 125 games, Drane drew 3, won 65 and lost 57, with a win rate of 52%. In September 2023, Drane became the third netball player to be inducted into the Welsh Sports Hall of Fame.

Tournaments	Place
2006 FENA Open	2nd
2006 Commonwealth Games	8th
2007 World Netball Championships Qualifiers	1st
2009 Netball Europe Open Championship	?
2010 Netball Europe Open Championship	2nd
2011 World Netball Championships Qualifiers	2nd
2010 Netball Singapore Nations Cup	1st
2011 Netball Europe Open Championship	2nd
2011 World Netball Championships	9th
2012 Netball Europe Open Championship	3rd
2013 Netball Europe Open Championship	1st
2014 Netball Europe Open Championships	1st
2014 Commonwealth Games	8th
2015 Netball Europe Open Championships	3rd
2015 Netball World Cup	7th
2016 Netball Europe Open Championships	2nd
2017 Netball Europe Open Championships	4th
2019 Netball World Cup Regional Qualifier – Europe	3rd
2018 Commonwealth Games	11th
2019 Netball Europe Open Championships	2th
2022 Commonwealth Games	8th
2023 Netball World Cup Regional Qualifier – Europe	1st

== Honours ==
Wales

- Netball Europe Open Championships
  - Winners: 2013, 2014
- Netball World Cup Qualifiers
  - Winners: 2023
- Netball Singapore Nations Cup
  - Winners: 2010

Celtic Dragons

- Netball Superleague
  - Runners Up: 2013
