= Isle of Man national netball team =

National netball team

Isle of Man
- Nickname(s): Manx Rams
- Association: Isle of Man Netball
- Confederation: Europe Netball
- Head coach: Dr. Jane Lomax
- Asst coach: Nordia Masters
- Manager: Pip Cross
- Co-captains: Ashley Hall; Rachel Johnstone
- World ranking: 31st
Team colours	Alternate

The Isle of Man national netball team represents Isle of Man Netball in international netball tournaments. Since 2018, the Isle of Man has regularly competed in the Europe Netball Open Challenge. In 2019 they hosted and won the tournament. They have also played in Netball World Cup Qualifiers. As of 1 September 2025, the Isle of Man are listed 31st on the World Netball Rankings.

== History ==
=== Early years ===
The Manx Netball Association was officially formed in September 1984. In 1989 it became affiliated as a county to England Netball. An Isle of Man team competed in the 2005 FENA Open. This tournament also served as a qualifier for the 2006 Commonwealth Games. In 2017, the now Isle of Man Netball successfully applied to join Netball Europe and the International Netball Federation. In 2018 the Isle of Man made their debut at the Netball Europe Open Challenge and finished second. In May 2019, they hosted and won the Challenge tournament. The team was captained by Ashley Hall, the sister of the England netball international, Jade Clarke. In November 2021, the Isle of Man played in their first ever netball series when they hosted Wales.

=== World Netball Rankings ===
In June 2019, after winning the Netball Europe Open Challenge, the Isle of Man entered the World Netball Rankings for the first time. They were listed joint 21st with Grenada. In June 2025 they jumped five places from their previous listing to reach 31st. As of 1 September 2025, the Isle of Man are listed 31st.

== Tournament history ==
=== FENA Open ===
Tournaments	Place
2005 FENA Open	

=== Europe Netball Open Challenge ===
Tournaments	Place
2018 Netball Europe Open Challenge	2nd
2019 Netball Europe Open Challenge	1st
2021 Europe Netball Open Challenge	2nd
2022 Europe Netball Open Challenge	3rd
2023 Europe Netball Open Challenge	3rd
2024 Europe Netball Open Challenge	4th

=== Netball World Cup Qualifiers ===
Tournaments	Place
2023 Netball World Cup Regional Qualifier – Europe	4th

=== Wendy White Trophy Series ===
Tournaments	Place
2022 Wendy White Trophy Series	2nd

=== Island Invitational Netball Games ===
In November 2023, the Isle of Man hosted and won the inaugural Island Invitational Netball Games. This tournament was created because netball is not featured at the Island Games. The Isle of Man won the tournament after defeating Jersey 48–32 in their final match.

Tournaments	Place
2023 Island Invitational Netball Games	1st

=== Netball Singapore Nations Cup ===
Tournaments	Place
2025 Netball Singapore Nations Cup	6th

== Notable players ==
=== Current squad ===
The current squad was selected for the 2025 Netball Singapore Nations Cup

Isle of Man roster
Players
Coaches

Name	Pos	DOB	Height	Club	Nat	Caps
Rebecca Cooke	GA, GS		–
Alice Cross	GS		–
Rhian Evans	C, WA		–
Ashley Hall (cc)	C, WA, GA		–
Aalish Harris	GS, GA		–
Lexa Hattersley			–
Rachel Johnstone (cc)	C, WA, WD		–
Zoe Kirkham	GK, GD		–
Paige McQuarrie			–
Mackenzie Pizzey	GD, GK, WD		–
Chloe Swales	GS, GA		–
Natalie Swales	GD, GK		–

Head coach

- Dr. Jane Lomax

Assistant coach

- Nordia Masters

Manager: Pip Cross
Physiotherapist: Alex Johnston
Strength and conditioning: Ben Carling

Notes

- (c) – Captain
- (cc) – Co-captain
- (vc) – Vice-captain
- – Injury / maternity leave
- (TRP) – Temporary Replacement Player

=== Captains ===
Captains	Years
Ashley Hall	2018–
Rachel Johnstone	2025–

== Head coaches ==
Coach	Years
Claire Battye	201x–2025
Dr. Jane Lomax	2025–

== Honours ==
- Europe Netball Open Challenge
  - Winners: 2019
  - Runners Up: 2018, 2021
- Island Invitational Netball Games
  - Winners: 2023
