= Chelsea Beard =

Wales netball international (born 1993)

Personal information
- Full name: Chelsea Beard (Née: Lewis)
- Born: 24 November 1993 (age 32) Merthyr Tydfil, Wales
- Height: 185 cm (6 ft 1 in)
- School: Aberdare Girls' School; Neath Port Talbot College
- University: Cardiff Metropolitan University

Netball career
- Playing positions: GS, GA
Years	Club team	Apps
2010–2015	Celtic Dragons	
2015	Netball Waitakere	
2015–2018	Team Bath	
2017	→ Celtic Flames	
2018–	Celtic Dragons	
Years	National team	Caps
2010–	Wales	
Coaching career
- Years: Team
- Monmouth School for Girls
- Updated on 23 April 2020

Chelsea Beard, formerly known as Chelsea Lewis, is a Wales netball international. She represented Wales at the 2011 and 2015 Netball World Cups and at the 2014 and 2018 Commonwealth Games. She was also a member of the Wales teams that won the 2010 Netball Singapore Nations Cup and the 2013 and 2014 European Netball Championships. At club level she has played for Celtic Dragons and Team Bath in the Netball Superleague.

== Early life and education ==
Lewis is originally from Aberdare. She was educated at Aberdare Girls' School, where she first began to play netball, Neath Port Talbot College and Cardiff Metropolitan University.

== Playing career ==
=== Celtic Dragons ===
Lewis first played for Celtic Dragons between 2010 and 2015. She was a member of the Dragons squad that finished as runners up to Team Bath in the 2013 Netball Superleague. She guested for Dragons when they played as Celtic Flames in the 2017 Netball New Zealand Super Club. After three seasons with Team Bath, Lewis re-joined Dragons for the 2019 season. She withdrew from the 2020 Dragons squad after announcing her pregnancy.

=== Netball Waitakere ===
In 2015 Lewis played for Netball Waitakere in New Zealand.

=== Team Bath ===
Lewis played for Team Bath during the 2016, 2017 and 2018 seasons.

=== Wales ===
Lewis made her senior debut for Wales in 2010 during a qualifying tournament for the 2011 World Netball Championships. She was the 190th Wales international and, at the age of 16, she was also the youngest. She was subsequently a member of the Wales team that won the 2010 Netball Singapore Nations Cup. She was also a member of the Wales teams that won the 2013 and 2014 Netball Europe Open Championships. Lewis also represented Wales at the 2011 and 2015 Netball World Cups and at the 2014 and 2018 Commonwealth Games.

Lewis made her 50th senior appearance for Wales in a match against Uganda during the 2015 Netball World Cup. Aged 21 years, 7 months and 23 days, she became the youngest Wales international to gain 50 senior caps. At the same tournament she scored 232 for Wales and helped them finish in seventh place, their best finish since 1991.

Tournaments	Place
2010 World Netball Championships Qualifier	2nd
2010 Netball Singapore Nations Cup	1st place, gold medalist(s)
2011 World Netball Championships	9th
2013 European Netball Championship	1st place, gold medalist(s)
2014 Netball Europe Open Championships	1st place, gold medalist(s)
2014 Commonwealth Games	7th
2015 Netball Europe Open Championships	3rd
2015 Netball World Cup	7th
2016 Netball Europe Open Championships	2nd
2017 Netball Europe Open Championships	4th
2018 Commonwealth Games	8th
2019 Netball Europe Open Championships	2nd place, silver medalist(s)

== Personal life and employment ==
Lewis is in a relationship with Adam Beard, the Wales rugby union international. She coaches netball at Monmouth School for Girls

== Honours ==
Wales

- Netball Europe Open Championships
  - Winners: 2013, 2014: 2
  - Runners Up: 2016, 2019 : 2
- Netball Singapore Nations Cup
  - Winners: 2010: 1

Celtic Dragons

- Netball Superleague
  - Runners Up: 2013: 1
