= Christleton High School =

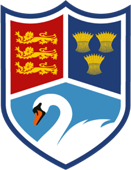

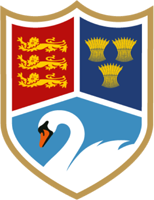
- Top: Logo (blue variant) Bottom: Logo (gold variant)

Location
- Christleton, Cheshire; England; 53°10′59″N 2°50′00″W

Information
- Type: Academy
- Motto: Bringing Aspirations to Life in a Happy, Hardworking and Caring Community
- Established: September 1958
- Department for Education URN: 136645 Tables
- Ofsted: Reports
- Chair: Paul Heath
- Headteacher: Kevin Smith
- Staff: 125
- Gender: Coeducational
- Age: 11 to 18
- Enrolment: 1,370
- Publication: The Swan
- Website: Official website

Christleton High School is a large academy school located in the small village of Christleton on the outskirts of Chester, England. The school is part of The Learning Trust, a small multi-academy trust, based in Chester, that also includes Belgrave primary school, Chester International School and Queen's Park High School. The Headteacher is Kevin Smith. The school offers education from age 11 to 18 and has its own Sixth Form.

Three current sitting Members of Parliament attended the school; Sarah Atherton, Samantha Dixon and Luke Pollard.

== History ==
Christleton County Secondary Modern School opened in 1958 and became the 17th secondary modern school and 57th completed new school to open in Cheshire.

The Secondary Modern and Secondary Technical School was designed to cater for the needs of pupils in the developing areas of Vicars Cross, Guilden Sutton, Mickle Trafford, Waverton, Barrow and Christleton, but also took in pupils from an area of approximately 75 sq miles.

The first school in Christleton was the John Sellars Charity School, built on land adjacent to the church in 1779, and was primarily for the education of boys. The same charity built a Girls' and Infants' School on land opposite the present High School, and this was extended in 1873.

The structure of schools for local children was established but there were also fee paying schools e.g. Christleton Academy for Young Gentlemen, and a Dame School which was adjacent to where the school stands today. This remained the structure until after World War II, when the building of new homes and private estates led to the need for additional schools.

In the late 1950s, Christleton was situated in the administrative district of Ellesmere Port and Chester Rural, an area stretching from Ellesmere Port to Malpas and skirting the eastern edge of the Chester City boundary. At the age of 11, 'higher' ability children would travel to Ellesmere Port Boys' and Girls' Grammar Schools for their education and a new school planned for Christleton would cater for the remainder.

This Secondary Modern and Secondary Technical School was designed to cater for the needs of pupils in the developing areas of Vicars Cross, Guilden Sutton, Mickle Trafford, Waverton, Barrow and Christleton, but also took in many other parts of the rural district, an area of 75 sq miles.

At its official opening on Friday 3 October 1958, Christleton County Secondary Modern School, as it was then called, became the 17th Secondary Modern School and 57th completed new school to open in Cheshire.

== Sports facilities ==
Christleton High School has access to the council owned Christleton Sports Centre, located on the school site. The facilities include a sports hall, gym, squash court, dance studio, a large outdoor floodlit court, an all-weather pitch and swimming pool.

== Ofsted ==
The school currently has a good Ofsted rating which was given in 2024. A previous inspection in 2014 by Ofsted gave the school a rating of outstanding.

== Notable pupils ==
- Sarah Atherton, MP for Wrexham from 2019 to 2024
- Samantha Dixon, MP for Chester North and Neston
- Chumisa Dornford-May, musical theatre actress
- Suzy Drane, a former Wales netball international
- Russell Griffiths, footballer
- Luke Pollard, MP for Plymouth Sutton and Devonport
- Tom Roebuck, rugby union player
