= Helen Weston =

Wales netball international

Personal information
- Full name: Helen Patricia Weston
- Born: 1965 (age 60–61) Pontypool, Wales
- School: Croesyceiliog School

Netball career
- Playing positions: GK, GD
Years	Club team	Apps
??	Cwmbran Netball Club	
2002	South East Wales	
Years	National team	Caps
1982–2002	Wales	111

Helen Patricia Weston is a former Wales netball international. She represented Wales at the 1993 World Games and the 1998 Commonwealth Games. She also represented Wales at the 1983, 1991, 1995 and 1999 World Netball Championships. She captained Wales at the 1999 tournament. In June 2007, Weston became the first netball player to be inducted into the Welsh Sports Hall of Fame.

== Playing career ==
=== Wales ===
Between 1982 and 2002, Weston made 111 senior appearances for Wales. She played as a Goal Keeper and Goal Defence. On 22 November 1982, at the age of 17, she made her senior debut for Wales against New Zealand. She represented Wales at the 1993 World Games and the 1998 Commonwealth Games. She also represented Wales at the 1983, 1991, 1995 and 1999 World Netball Championships. During the 1999 tournament she captained Wales and made her 100th senior appearance. She also regularly played for Wales against England, Northern Ireland, the Republic of Ireland and Scotland. On 12 March 2002, Weston made her final appearance for Wales in a match against Barbados. Across her 111 appearances, Helen achieved 58 wins, 1 draw and 52 losses, giving her a win rate of 52.25%. She retired in 2002, at the age of 37, after not been selected for the 2002 Commonwealth Games. She remained Wales' most capped netball international until July 2022, when she was overtaken by Suzy Drane.

Tournaments	Matches played	Place
1983 World Netball Tournament	5	8th
1991 World Netball Championships	11	7th
1993 World Games	5	6th
1995 World Netball Championships	8	17th
1998 Commonwealth Games	5	9th
1999 World Netball Championships	11	14th

== Welsh Sports Hall of Fame ==
In June 2007, Weston became the first netball player to be inducted into the Welsh Sports Hall of Fame. Together with Joe Calzaghe and Arthur Gould, she was one of three 2007 inductees from Gwent.
