= United Arab Emirates national netball team =

National netball team

United Arab Emirates
- Nickname(s): Falcons
- Association: UAE Netball Federation
- Confederation: Europe Netball
- Head coach: Deb Jones
- Captain: Carly Lewis
- World ranking: 27th
Team colours	Alternate

The United Arab Emirates national netball team represents the UAE Netball Federation in international netball tournaments. Since 2018, the UAE Netball Federation has been affiliated to Europe Netball and since then they have regularly competed in the Europe Netball Open Challenge. They have also played in the Netball Singapore Nations Cup. As of 1 September 2025, the United Arab Emirates are listed 27th on the World Netball Rankings.

== Tournament history ==
=== Europe Netball Open Challenge ===
Tournaments	Place
2018 Netball Europe Open Challenge	3rd
2019 Netball Europe Open Challenge	4th
2021 Europe Netball Open Challenge	1st
2022 Europe Netball Open Challenge	2nd
2023 Europe Netball Open Challenge	1st
2024 Europe Netball Open Challenge	2nd

=== Netball Singapore Nations Cup ===
Tournaments	Place
2024 Netball Singapore Nations Cup	3rd

== Current squad ==
United Arab Emirates roster
Players
Coaches

Name	Pos	DOB	Height	Club	Nat	Caps
Jemma Eley	WA, GA		–
Alana Farrell-Morton	WD, WA		–
Sophie Hankin	WA, GA		–
Noorulain Hussain	WA		–
Carly Lewis (c)	C		–
Kelly Loy	GK, GD		–
Charlie Preston	GS, GA		–
Ellie Smith	GS, GA		–
Victoria Sole	GD, GK		–
Nicole Sproul	GD, WD		–
Rachel Tuckey	WD, C		–
Fiona Van Dam	GK, GD		–

Head coach

- Deb Jones

Manager: Penny Ashcroft

Notes

- (c) – Captain
- (cc) – Co-captain
- (vc) – Vice-captain
- – Injury / maternity leave
- (TRP) – Temporary Replacement Player
Player profiles: Team website
Last updated: 7 October 2025

== Honours ==
- Europe Netball Open Challenge
  - Winners: 2021, 2023
  - Runners Up: 2022, 2024
