= Adi Bolakoro =

Fijian netball player (born 1985)

Personal information
- Born: 3 April 1985 (age 41)
- Occupation: netball player
- Height: 1.85 m (6 ft 1 in)

Netball career
- Playing positions: wing defense, goal defense, goal keeper

Adi Vakaoca Bolakoro (born 3 April 1985) is a Fijian former netball player who played for Fiji in the positions of goal defense, wing defense or goal keeper. She was included in the Fijian squad for the 2019 Netball World Cup, which was also her maiden appearance at a Netball World Cup. She last played for the Celtic Dragons club in the Netball Superleague.
