= Cardiff Dragons (netball) =

Welsh netball team

LexisNexis Dragons
- Founded: 2005
- Based in: Cardiff and Liverpool
- Regions: Wales
- Home venue: Cardiff City House of Sport; M&S Bank Arena
- Head coach: Reinga Bloxham
- Captain: Beth Dyke
- Vice-captain: Jacqui Newton; Leah Middleton
- League: Netball Superleague
- Website: www.cardiffdragons.com
Home	Away

Dragons (formerly Cardiff Dragons, currently known as LexisNexis Dragons for sponsorship reasons) are a Welsh netball team based in Cardiff and Liverpool. Their senior team plays in the Netball Superleague. In 2005–06, as Celtic Dragons, they were founder members of the league. Their best performance in the Superleague came in 2013 when they finished as runners up to Team Bath. Playing as Celtic Flames, Dragons also played in the 2017 Netball New Zealand Super Club. Cardiff Dragons main partners include Wales Netball, the Wales national netball team and Cardiff Metropolitan University. The team changed its name from Celtic Dragons to Cardiff Dragons on 31 August 2023 in preparation for the 2024 season.

In October 2025, the team announced that it would drop "Cardiff" from its name for the 2026 Netball Super League season and split its home games between Cardiff and the M&S Bank Arena in Liverpool.

== History ==
=== Netball Superleague ===
Celtic Dragons were formed in 2005 and were named as the Wales franchise in the new Netball Superleague. Together with Brunel Hurricanes, Galleria Mavericks, Leeds Carnegie, Loughborough Lightning, Northern Thunder, Team Bath and Team Northumbria, Dragons were founder members of the league. Their best performance in the Superleague came in 2013 when they finished as runners up to Team Bath.

=== Celtic Flames ===
Playing as Celtic Flames, Celtic Dragons played in the 2017 Netball New Zealand Super Club. The Celtic Flames squad featured past and present Dragons players, including Chelsea Lewis and Nia Jones, and two guest players, Anna Thompson and Temalisi Fakahokotau of Mainland Tactix. Both were also New Zealand internationals. Flames finished in fifth place, ahead of all other invited international teams outside Australia and New Zealand.

=== Wales ===
Cardiff Dragons work in partnership with both the Welsh Netball Association and the Wales national netball team. Melissa Hyndman, Trish Wilcox and Julie Hoornweg all served as joint head coach of both Dragons and Wales. At the 2018 Commonwealth Games eleven of the squad were Dragons players and the twelfth, Chelsea Lewis was a former player.

== Senior finals ==
=== Netball Superleague Grand Finals ===
Season	Winners	Score	Runners up	Venue
2013	Team Bath	62–56	Celtic Dragons	University of Worcester Arena

== Home venue ==
Dragons' current home venue is the Cardiff City House of Sport, located adjacent to the Cardiff City Stadium, having moved to the 1100-seat venue in 2022. Until 2022 Dragons played the majority of their home Netball Superleague games at Sport Wales National Centre in Sophia Gardens. They also trained and played some home games at Cardiff Metropolitan University. They have also occasionally played home games at Wrexham Glyndŵr University and at Cwmbran Stadium.

Following the team's rebranding ahead of the 2026 season, the M&S Bank Arena in Liverpool is also jointly used as their home stadium, along with the Cardiff City House of Sport.

== Notable players ==
=== 2026 squad ===
2026 LexisNexis Dragons roster
Players
Coaching staff

Nat.	Name	Position(s)	DoB	Height
(Wales)	Phillipa Yarranton	GA, GS	10 September 1995	1.77 m (5 ft 10 in)
(Wales)	Georgia Rowe	GS	9 May 1995	1.96 m (6 ft 5 in)
(Wales)	Leah Middleton	GD, GK	7 April 1995	1.87 m (6 ft 2 in)
(South Africa)	Khanyisa Chawane	C, WD	14 January 1994	1.67 m (5 ft 6 in)
(Australia)	Jacqui Newton	GD, GK, WD	14 February 1997	1.85 m (6 ft 1 in)
(Wales)	Bethan Dyke	C, WA	25 December 1994	1.64 m (5 ft 5 in)
(Wales)	Alexandra Johnson	GD, GK	26 September 2002	1.83 m (6 ft 0 in)
(England)	Ellen Withington	C, WD, WD		–
(Scotland)	Niamh McCall	GA,GS	28 April 2000	1.79 m (5 ft 10 in)
(Wales)	Vicky Booth	WD,C		–

Head coach

- Reinga Bloxham

Notes

- (c) – Captain
- (cc) – Co-captain
- (vc) – Vice-captain
- – Injury / maternity leave
- (TRP) – Temporary Replacement Player
Player profiles: Team website
Last updated: 17 March 2026

=== Internationals ===
Wales

- Alex Johnson
- Caris Morgan
- Celyn Emanuel
- Ellen Morgan
- Ellie Blackwell
- Georgia Rowe
- Leah Middleton
- Nansi Kuti
- Phillipa Yarranton
- Vicky Booth
- Zoe Matthewman
- Anna Mayes
- Bethan Dyke
- Chelsea Lewis
- Nia Jones
- Nicola Lewis
- Sara Hale
- Suzy Drane

England

- Lindsay Keable
- Rachel Dunn

Fiji

- Adi Bolakoro
- Afa Rusivakula
- Episake Kahatoka

Jamaica

- Latanya Wilson
- Rebekah Robinson

South Africa

- Khanyisa Chawane

== Head coaches ==
Coach	Years
(England) Jess Garland	2006–2007
(Wales) Anna Mayes	2007–2008
(New Zealand) Melissa Hyndman	2010–2014
(New Zealand) Trish Wilcox	2014–2018
(Australia) Julie Hoornweg	2018
(New Zealand) Tania Hoffman	2018–2021
(New Zealand) Reinga Bloxham	2024-

== Honours ==
- Netball Superleague
  - Runners Up: 2013: 1
