= David Kendix =

English pensions expert and cricket statistician

David Colin Kendix (born 2 April 1966) is an English cricket statistician, scorer and actuary.

He developed and maintains the ICC Team cricket rankings. This ranks men's teams playing Tests, ODIs and T20Is and women's teams playing ODIs and T20Is. His system involves awarding points based on results over the previous 3–4 years, with a great weighting towards more recent matches. As the ICC's statistician, he has sat on the ICC Cricket Committee since 2006, with particular responsibility for identifying statistical trends in the game and for drafting playing regulations. He has been President of The ACS – The Association of Cricket Statisticians and Historians (acscricket.com) since 2017. Since 1995, Kendix has been the official scorer in more than 100 international matches, including 49 Test matches and the 2019 World Cup final at Lord's. He has been a member elected director of Middlesex County Cricket Club since 2009 and was the club's treasurer between 2016 and 2022.

Since 2008, Kendix has also developed and maintained the World Netball Rankings.
