= Netball World Cup Qualifiers – Europe =

International netball competition

- Sport: Netball
- Founded: 2006
- First season: 2006
- Organising body: Europe Netball
- Most recent champion: Wales
- Most titles: Wales (3 titles)
- Broadcasters: BBC Sport; YouTube
- Related competitions: Netball Europe Open Championships; Europe Netball Open Challenge

The Netball World Cup Qualifiers – Europe are a series of netball tournaments organised by Europe Netball to determine who will represent Europe at Netball World Cups. Wales are the series most successful team. Northern Ireland and Scotland have also won the series. Since 2007, Europe has had three representatives at Netball World Cups. England have qualified for recent World Cups based on their top six placing on the World Netball Rankings, while two teams have qualified via this series.

== History ==
=== Tournaments ===
Tournaments	Winners	Runners up	3rd	4th	5th	6th
2007	Wales	Scotland	Northern Ireland			
2011	Northern Ireland	Wales	Scotland			
2015	Wales	Scotland	Northern Ireland	Republic of Ireland		
2019	Scotland	Northern Ireland	Wales			
2023	Wales	Scotland	Northern Ireland	Isle of Man	Republic of Ireland	Gibraltar

=== Qualifiers ===
Tournaments	Qualifier 1	Qualifier 2	Qualifier 3
2007 World Netball Championships	England	Wales	Scotland
2011 World Netball Championships	England	Northern Ireland	Wales
2015 Netball World Cup	England	Wales	Scotland
2019 Netball World Cup	England	Scotland	Northern Ireland
2023 Netball World Cup	England	Wales	Scotland
