= Israel national netball team =

National netball team

Israel
- Association: Israel Netball
- Confederation: Europe Netball
- World ranking: 46th
Team colours

The Israel national netball team represents Israel Netball in international netball tournaments, including the Europe Netball Open Challenge and the Maccabiah Games. As of 1 September 2025, Israel are listed 46th on the World Netball Rankings.

== Tournament history ==
=== Netball at the Maccabiah Games ===
Tournaments	Place
2005 Maccabiah Games	4th
2009 Maccabiah Games	
2013 Maccabiah Games	2nd
2017 Maccabiah Games	
2022 Maccabiah Games	

=== Europe Netball Open Challenge ===
Tournaments	Place
2008 Netball Europe Festival	
2010 Netball Europe Festival	4th
2012 Netball Europe Festival	5th
2016 Netball Europe Open Challenge	7th
2017 Netball Europe Open Challenge	4th
2018 Netball Europe Open Challenge	5th
2019 Netball Europe Open Challenge	5th
2022 Europe Netball Open Challenge	7th
2023 Europe Netball Open Challenge	7th

Notes

- ^1 The 2025 tournament was cancelled. After the Palestine Solidarity Campaign objected to Israel competing, Europe Netball decided to cancel the whole tournament.
