= Guernsey national netball team =

Guernsey
- Nickname(s): Panthers
- Confederation: Netball Europe
- Head coach: Verona Tomlinson
- Asst coach: James Robert
- Manager: Amber Staples
Team colours

Netball World Cup
- Appearances: none

Commonwealth Games
- Appearances: none

The Guernsey national netball team represents Guernsey in international netball.
