= Wales national netball team =

National netball team

Wales
- Nickname(s): Welsh Feathers
- Association: Wales Netball
- Confederation: Europe Netball
- Head coach: Emily Handyside
- Captain: Bethan Dyke
- Most caps: Suzy Drane (125)
- World ranking: 7th
Red uniform	Black uniform

First international
- Wales 14–13 Scotland; GEC Ground, Wembley, 7 May 1949

Netball World Cup
- Appearances: 14 (Debuted in 1963)
- 2023 placing: 9th
- Best result: 6th (1975, 1979)

Commonwealth Games
- Appearances: 5 (Debuted in 2002)
- 2022 placing: 8th
- Best result: 6th (2002)

The Wales national netball team, also known as the Welsh Feathers, represents Wales Netball in international netball competitions such as the Netball World Cup, the Commonwealth Games, the Netball Europe Open Championships, Netball World Cup Qualifiers and the Netball Singapore Nations Cup. Since 2005–06, Wales has also effectively competed in the Netball Super League, initially playing as Celtic Dragons and more recently as Cardiff Dragons. As of March 2026, Wales are listed 7th on the World Netball Rankings, making the squad the highest ranked international sport in Wales.

== History ==
=== Early tests ===
Wales made their Test debut on 7 May 1949 with a 14–13 win against Scotland. The match was played at the General Electric Company ground on Preston Road, Wembley during the 1949 England Scotland Wales Netball Series. Wales also played England for the first time on the same day, losing 25–3. In 1951, as part of the Festival of Britain celebrations, Wales hosted their first home international match, played outdoors at Cathays High School, Cardiff. Wales lost to England by 26–7. In April 1957, Wales hosted their first indoor home international matches at Sophia Gardens Pavilion. Wales lost to both England (34–5) and to Scotland (16–9). In 1980, with a team coached by Wendy White, Wales defeated England 33–29 in Plymouth. This was the first time Wales had defeated England.

=== Netball Super League ===
Since 2005–06, Wales has also effectively competed in the Netball Super League, initially playing as Celtic Dragons. Since the 2024 season, they have played as Cardiff Dragons. Melissa Hyndman, Trish Wilcox and Julie Hoornweg all served as joint head coach of both Dragons and Wales. At the 2018 Commonwealth Games eleven of the squad were Dragons players and the twelfth, Chelsea Lewis was a former player. Dragons players continue to make up the majority of the Wales team.

=== World Netball Rankings ===
Between 2008 and 2024, Wales averaged 9th in the World Netball Rankings. In September 2017, they were listed 7th. In March 2022, they qualified for the 2022 Commonwealth Games after being ranked 8th. In March 2025 they were listed 6th for the first time.

== Tournament history ==
=== Major tournaments ===
==== Netball World Cup ====
Wales have been regular participants in Netball World Cups. They didn't travel to the 1967 tournament and failed to qualify in 2019. The highest position they have finished is 6th which they achieved on twice, in 1975 and 1979.

Tournaments	Place
1963 World Netball Tournament	10th
1971 World Netball Tournament	7th
1975 World Netball Tournament	6th
1979 World Netball Tournament	6th
1983 World Netball Tournament	8th
1987 World Netball Tournament	13th
1991 World Netball Championships	7th
1995 World Netball Championships	17th
1999 World Netball Championships	14th
2003 World Netball Championships	14th
2007 World Netball Championships	12th
2011 World Netball Championships	9th
2015 Netball World Cup	7th
2023 Netball World Cup	9th

==== Commonwealth Games ====
Wales have been regular participants in Netball at the Commonwealth Games. Their highest ever finish came in 2002 when they finished 6th.

Tournaments	Place
2002 Commonwealth Games	6th
2006 Commonwealth Games	8th
2014 Commonwealth Games	8th
2018 Commonwealth Games	11th
2022 Commonwealth Games	8th

==== World Games ====
Tournaments	Place
1993 World Games	6th

=== European tournaments ===
==== Netball Europe Open Championships ====
Wales have regularly played in the Netball Europe Open Championships. They have won the tournament on three occasions. In 2001 with a team coached by Raewyn Henry they clinched the title when they defeated England 59–58 in Canterbury. In 2013, with a team featuring Suzy Drane, Sara Hale and Chelsea Lewis and coached by Melissa Hyndman, Wales won the title after defeating England 37–33. In 2014, Wales retained the title and qualified for the 2015 Netball World Cup.

Tournaments	Place
1998 FENA Open	
1999 FENA Open	
2000 FENA Open	
2001 FENA Open	1st
2002 FENA Open	
2003 FENA Open	
2004 FENA Open	
2005 FENA Open	2nd
2006 FENA Open	2nd
2007 FENA Open	2nd
2008 FENA Open	4th
2009 Netball Europe Open Championships	4th
2010 Netball Europe Open Championships	2nd
2011 Netball Europe Open Championships	2nd
2012 Netball Europe Open Championships	3rd
2013 Netball Europe Open Championships	1st
2014 Netball Europe Open Championships	1st
2015 Netball Europe Open Championships	3rd
2016 Netball Europe Open Championships	2nd
2017 Netball Europe Open Championships	4th
2019 Netball Europe Open Championships	2nd

==== Netball World Cup Qualifiers ====
Tournaments	Place
2007 World Netball Championships Qualifier – Europe	1st
2011 World Netball Championships Qualifier – Europe	2nd
2014 Netball Europe Open Championships	1st
2019 Netball World Cup Regional Qualifier – Europe	3rd
2023 Netball World Cup Regional Qualifier – Europe	1st

=== Invitational tournaments ===
==== Celtic Cup ====
The Celtic Cup series is hosted and organised by Netball Northern Ireland, Netball Scotland and Wales Netball. The series features Northern Ireland, Scotland and Wales playing a series of test matches against each other and visiting national teams. Wales won the inaugural 2024 series.

Tournaments	Place
2024 Celtic Cup	1st
2025 Celtic Cup	3rd

==== Wendy White Trophy Series ====
Wales Netball introduced the Wendy White Trophy Series in honour of Wendy White, a former Wales player and head coach. In February 2017, the inaugural series saw Wales host New Zealand. Since the series has featured Samoa and South Africa. In 2022, the series saw Wales host Gibraltar, the Isle of Man and the Republic of Ireland.

Tournaments	Place
2017 Wendy White Trophy Series (February)	2nd
2017 Wendy White Trophy Series (December)	1st
2019 Wendy White Trophy Series	2nd
2022 Wendy White Trophy Series	1st

==== Netball Singapore Nations Cup ====
In 2010, with a team featuring Suzy Drane, Sara Hale and Chelsea Lewis and coached by Melissa Hyndman, Wales won the Netball Singapore Nations Cup. In the final they defeated Scotland 53–30.

Tournaments	Place
2010 Netball Singapore Nations Cup	1st

== Notable players ==
=== Current Squad ===
Wales 2025–26 roster
Players
Coaches

Name	Pos	DOB	Height	Club	Nat	Caps
Ellie Blackwell	GD, GK		–	Cardiff Dragons NXT Gen
Vicky Booth	C, WD		–	Cardiff Dragons
Millie Carter	GD, GK	10 May 2002 (age 24)	–	AO Manchester Thunder NXT Gen
Bethan Dyke (c)	C, WA	25 December 1994 (age 31)	1.64 m (5 ft 5 in)	Cardiff Dragons
Celyn Emanuel	C, WA		1.70 m (5 ft 7 in)	Cardiff Dragons NXT Gen
Alex Johnson	GD, GK, WD	26 September 2002 (age 24)	1.83 m (6 ft 0 in)	Cardiff Dragons
Nansi Kuti	GS, GA		–	Cardiff Dragons NXT Gen
Zoe Matthewman	GS, GA		1.82 m (6 ft 0 in)	Cardiff Dragons NXT Gen
Leah Middleton	GD, GK	7 April 1995 (age 31)	–	Cardiff Dragons
Caris Morgan	GD, GK		–	Cardiff Dragons NXT Gen
Ellen Morgan	C, WD		–	Team Bath NXT Gen
Meg Pilkington	C, WD		–	Nottingham Forest Netball NXT Gen
Georgia Rowe	GS, GA	9 May 1995 (age 31)	1.96 m (6 ft 5 in)	Cardiff Dragons
Poppy Tydeman	GD, WD		–	Team Bath NXT Gen
Phillipa Yarranton	GA, GS	28 November 2003 (age 22)	–	Cardiff Dragons

Head coach

- Emily Handyside

Assistant coach

- Natalie Roddy

Physiotherapist: Luke Ford

Notes

- (c) – Captain
- (cc) – Co-captain
- (vc) – Vice-captain
- – Injury / maternity leave
- (TRP) – Temporary Replacement Player

=== Captains ===
Captains	Years
Sybil Nest Butler-Jones	1949
Patrica Willett	1963
Anne Lucas	1971
Jennifer Sealey	1975
Maria Gornell	1987, 1991
Helen Weston	1999, 2002
Joanna Griffiths	2002, 2003
Ursula Bowers	2006–2007
Suzy Drane	2010–2022
Sara Hale	2011
Nia Jones	2022–2025
Bethan Dyke	2023–

=== Welsh Sports Hall of Fame ===
The following Wales netball internationals have been inducted into the Welsh Sports Hall of Fame.

Inducted	Player	Appearances	Years
2007	Helen Weston	111	1982–2002
2019	Wendy White	7	1963
2023	Suzy Drane	125	2005–2022

=== Former players ===
- Anna Mayes, head coach of England
- Liz Nicholl, president of World Netball

== Head coaches ==
Coach	Years
Edith Parry	1959–
Wendy White	1968–1980
Jennifer Sealey	1983
Mary French	1984–1986
Beverley Ryan	1987
Julia Longville	1991, 2006
Avril Roper	1995
Jean Watson	1999
Raewyn Henry	2002–2003
Julia Harding	2005
Denise Ellis	2007–2008
Melissa Hyndman	2010–2014
Laura Williams	2014
Trish Wilcox	2014–2018
Julie Hoornweg	2018–2019
Sara Hale	2020–2023
Emily Handyside	2023–

== Honours ==
- Celtic Cup
  - Winners: 2024
- Netball Europe Open Championships
  - Winners: 2001, 2013, 2014
- Netball World Cup Qualifiers
  - Winners: 2007, 2015, 2023
- Netball Singapore Nations Cup
  - Winners: 2010
