= Switzerland national netball team =

Switzerland
- Association: Netball Switzerland
- Confederation: Netball Europe
- Head coach: Mollie Brodie
- Manager: Emma Connolly
- World ranking: 48
Team colours	Alternate

The Switzerland national netball team represent Netball Switzerland in international netball tests and competitions. As of 1st September 2025, they are ranked 48th in the world. Established in 2009, Swiss Netball is a full member of the International Netball Federation (INF) and Netball Europe. Swiss Netball has worked hard to develop the game at the junior club level, as well as at senior level, and the national squad first obtained a world ranking in 2012.

== U17 Team ==
The U17 Squad was the very first national netball team established by Swiss Netball, making its debut in the Netball Europe Championships in March 2010. The team trains monthly from September to March, ending with annual participation in the Netball Europe Challenge Cup or Championship.

== U19 Team ==
Switzerland formed its first national U19 netball team in 2019. In its first year, the squad participated in the European Invitational Competition held in Dublin, Ireland. The establishment of the U19 team marked a significant expansion of the Swiss national pathway, creating a bridge between junior and senior performance programmes.

== U21 Team ==
Switzerland fielded an U21 national team for the first time in 2023, competing in a Netball Europe event. The introduction of this age group allowed Switzerland to complete a full national pathway, reflecting Swiss Netball's growth and development.

== Open Team ==
The Swiss Netball Nationalkader/Cadre national was established in 2012. A squad of 15 represented Switzerland at Netball Europe World Ranking Tournament in Gibraltar, May 2012. Over 4 days, the squad played 8 ranking matches against Israel, Malta, Gibraltar and the Republic of Ireland in order to begin their campaign to climb the ranking ladder. In May 2013 the team represented Switzerland at the Netball Europe Open Championships in Aberdeen. Switzerland won the Silver Medal in the Development Section of the Championships and Player of the Tournament. Switzerland has continued to attend and organise international ranking events, competing regularly in Europe Netball Open Challenge. The team subsequently achieved a highest world ranking of 28th and remains an active world-ranked nation, with recent rankings placing Switzerland 48th.

Year	Team	Captain
2012	Seniors	Andrea McKellar
2013	Seniors	Mollie Brodie and Charlotte Spelzini
2014	Seniors	Mollie Brodie and Claudia Almer (vice captain)
2015	Seniors	Claudia Almer and Helen Stevens (vice captain)
2024	Seniors	Claudia Almer
