= Jersey national netball team =

Jersey
- Nickname(s): Jets
- Confederation: Netball Europe
Team colours

Netball World Cup
- Appearances: none

Commonwealth Games
- Appearances: none

The Jersey national netball team represents Jersey in international netball.
