= Swiss Netball =

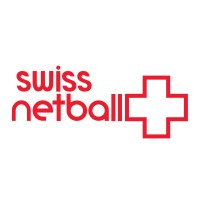
- Sport: Netball
- Jurisdiction: National
- Abbreviation: NCH
- Founded: 2009
- Affiliation: World Netball
- Affiliation date: 2011
- Regional affiliation: Europe Netball
- Affiliation date: 2011
- Headquarters: Geneva
- President: Claudia Almer
- Replaced: Netball Switzerland

Official website
- www.swissnetball.ch
- (Switzerland)

Swiss Netball was founded in 2009 by a group of volunteers to promote the game of netball in Switzerland. Netball Switzerland changed its name to Swiss Netball and joined the World Netball in 2011. Swiss Netball has developed a full player pathway through its Avenir Suisse Programme enabling the country to field U17, U19, U21, and Open squads.

The U17 Team have won the Netball Europe Challenge Cup in 2012, 2014, 2015, 2017 and 2019, and played in the Europe Netball Championship Cup Division in 2020.

The National Open Team first obtained a world ranking in 2012 and has climbed as high as 28th in the world. Switzerland is ranked 48th by World Netball as of 1st September 2025.

Switzerland has continued to compete regularly, including in the 2023 and 2024 Europe Netball Open Challenge Cup with Mollie Brodie appointed head coach.

== Development ==
The Under 17 team first represented Switzerland at the European Netball championships in 2010. The staff driving elite level netball programme launched the Cadre d'Espoir in 2011-12 with the aim of creating a player performance pathway. In 2024-2025, Swiss Netball introduced the Emerging Talent Programme (ETP), engaging 28 junior athletes and strengthening the long-term national pathway.

2010 Under 17 Netball team and Coaches

2011 Under 17 Netball team and Coaches

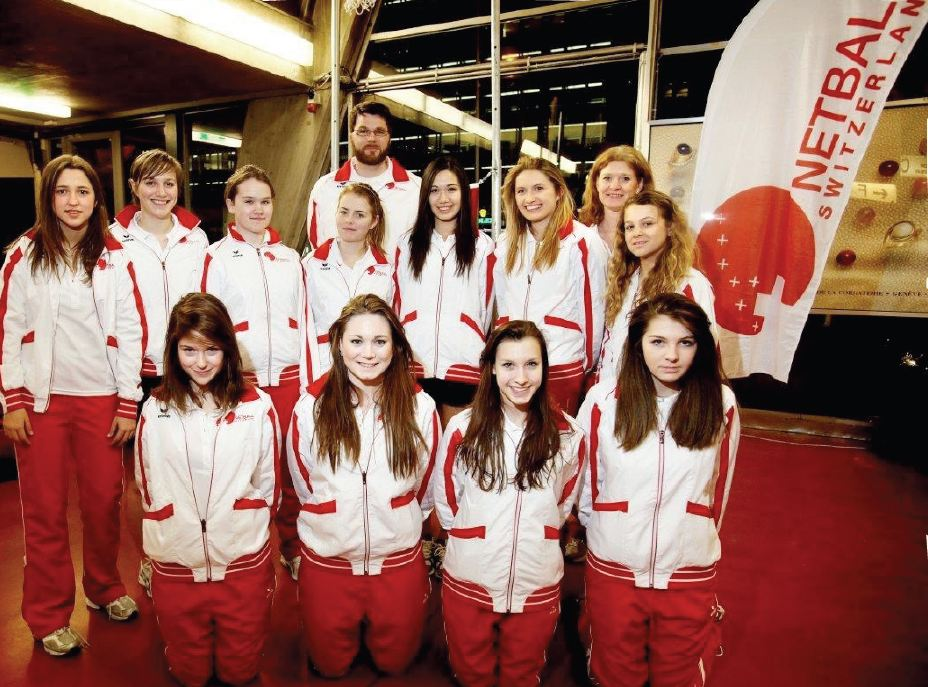
2012 Under 17 Netball team and Coaches

Year	Location	Captain
2010	Belfast	Kate Garden
2011	Dublin	Kate Garden
2012	Glasgow	Isabelle Turney (Co-C) and Emma Coulsen (Co-C)
2013	Malta	Georgia- May Gabb (Co-C) and Lauren Snyder (Co-C)
2014	Worcester	Oriane Calmy (C) and Sarah Irwin (VC)
2015	Hull	Oriane Calmy (C) and Pasqualina Vonlanthen Di Nenna (VC)
2016	Gibraltar	Grace Beesley (C) and Elsa Grand d'Hauteville (VC)
2017	Belfast	Grace Beesley (C) and Ruby Gribben (VC)
2018	Dublin	Ruby Gribben (C) and Agathe Grand d'Hauteville (VC)
2024	Gibraltar	Isabella Harper (C)
2025	Belfast	Charlotte Gamez (C)
2026	Isle of Man	Charlotte Gamez (C)

== Juniors ==
Swiss Netball is dedicated to developing netball both in public and international schools in Switzerland. Swiss Netball supports the development of competitions in schools and clubs as well as supporting the start up process for new clubs.

An annual junior tournament ("The JCT") is open to all Junior Clubs who are affiliated to Swiss Netball. The tournament is held in November, the tournament is played in age groups U11, U13, U15 & U17.

== Seniors ==
The Swiss Netball Nationalkader/Cadre national was established in 2012. A squad of 15 represented Switzerland at Netball Europe World Ranking Tournament in Gibraltar, May 2012. Switzerland achieved World Ranking at the tournament alongside Republic of Ireland, Israel, Malta and Gibraltar. In May 2013 the team represented Switzerland at the Netball Europe Open Championships in Aberdeen. Switzerland won the Silver Medal in the Development Section of the Championships and Player of the Tournament.

2012 Swiss National Team

Year	Team	Captain
2012	Seniors	Andrea McKellar
2013	Seniors	Mollie Brodie and Charlotte Spelzini
2014	Seniors	Mollie Brodie (C) and Claudia Almer (VC)
2015	Seniors	Claudia Almer (C) and Helen Stevens (VC)
2024	Seniors	Claudia Almer

== Annual Peppermill Tournament ==
The first annual Swiss Netball tournament took place in May at International School of Lausanne (ISL). It has grown from four local teams in 2008 to two tournaments, one in May for Junior's and one later in the year called " The Peppermill Challenge" for Seniors.

Year	Event	Winners
2008	Seniors	GIN
2009	Seniors	GIN
2010	Seniors	Lancy
2011	Seniors	Lancy
2012	Seniors	Zurich
2013	Seniors	Zurich
2014	Seniors	Zurich
2015	Seniors	Zurich
2016	Seniors	Meinier
2017	Seniors	GGNA
2018	Seniors	GGNA
2019	No Peppermill due to COVID	
2020	No Peppermill due to COVID	
2021	Seniors	Aubonne
2022	Seniors	Lancy Lightning
2023	Seniors	GIN
2024	Seniors	GIN
2025	Seniors	GIN

== Paprika Tournament ==
The inaugural Swiss Netball Mixed Tournament was newly introduced for the 2025-2026 season.

Year	Event	Winners
2026	Seniors	Lancy

== Awards and Honours ==
The Carmela Vonlanthen DiNenna Spirit of Sport Award is a Swiss Netball honour created in memory of Carmela Vonlanthen DiNenna, a netball player remembered for her courage, determination, and commitment to supporting others. Established after her death in April 2020, the award recognises an individual or small group who best exemplifies the "Spirit of Sport" through team spirit and meaningful contribution to netball and female sport in their local community. Nominees can be of any age, and the winner is chosen by a selection committee and announced at the Junior Clubs Tournament. This was awarded in 2025-26 to Layla Yasin.
