= Netball in Sweden =

- Country: Sweden
- National team: Sweden

Netball was brought to Sweden by the English early in the game's history. In the period between 1902 and 1925, copies of the netball rule book published by the Ling Association of England were sold in Sweden. During and preceding the 1970s, most of the world (outside of New Zealand and Australia) played a one handed variety of netball. This allowed a more fluid type of game, with longer passes designed to open up the court. While Australian Heather Main was studying in Stockholm, she started a team that eventually included three teams and became the Swedish Netball League. Sweden had a team participate at the 2010 European Festival in Malta. In 2010, Sweden participated in the European Netball Championship for the first time.
