= 2013 Netball Superleague season =

Netball Superleague season

- League: Netball Superleague
- Teams: 8
- TV partner: Sky Sports
- Champions: Team Bath
- Runners-up: Celtic Dragons
- Season MVP: Stacey Francis (Team Bath)

Seasons
- ← 2012 2014 →

The 2013 Netball Superleague season was the eighth season of the Netball Superleague. The league was won by Team Bath who defeated Celtic Dragons in the grand final. 2013 used a three phases format similar to 2012.

== Teams ==
During the close season Northern Thunder changed their name to Manchester Thunder.

2013 Superleague teams	Home venue/base	Country/Region
Celtic Dragons	Sport Wales National Centre	Wales
Hertfordshire Mavericks	University of Hertfordshire	East of England
Loughborough Lightning	Loughborough University	East Midlands
Manchester Thunder	Wright Robinson College	North West England
Team Bath	University of Bath	South West England/West of England
Team Northumbria	West Gate Centre for Sport, Newcastle	North East England
Surrey Storm	University of Surrey	Greater London/South East England
Yorkshire Jets	Hull / Leeds / Sheffield	Yorkshire

== Regular season ==
=== Phase 1 ===
2013 Netball Superleague season – Phase 1
Pos	Team	Pld	W	D	L	GF	GA	PP	Pts	Qualification
1	Team Bath	7	6	0	1	396	315	125.7	18	Qualified for Showdown
2	Surrey Storm	7	5	0	2	398	328	121.3	15	Qualified for Showdown
3	Celtic Dragons	7	4	1	2	405	339	119.5	13	Qualified for Showdown
4	Hertfordshire Mavericks	7	4	1	2	343	315	108.9	13	Qualified for Showdown
5	Manchester Thunder	7	4	0	3	393	319	123.2	12	Qualified for Challenger League
6	Yorkshire Jets	7	3	0	4	342	353	96.9	9	Qualified for Challenger League
7	Team Northumbria	7	1	0	6	255	415	61.4	3	Qualified for Challenger League
8	Loughborough Lightning	7	0	0	7	262	412	63.6	0	Qualified for Challenger League

=== Phase 2 ===
2013 Netball Superleague season – Showdown
Pos	Team	Pld	W	D	L	GF	GA	PP	Pts	Qualification
1	Team Bath	6	5	0	1	358	273	131.1	15	Qualified for semi-finals
2	Celtic Dragons	6	4	0	2	359	343	104.7	12	Qualified for semi-finals
3	Surrey Storm	6	3	0	3	338	322	105.0	9	Qualified for semi-finals
4	Hertfordshire Mavericks	6	0	0	6	246	363	67.8	6	Qualified for 4th/5th place play-off

2013 Netball Superleague season – Challenger League
Pos	Team	Pld	W	D	L	GF	GA	PP	Pts	Qualification
5	Manchester Thunder	6	6	0	0	337	225	149.8	18	Qualified for 4th/5th place play-off
6	Yorkshire Jets	6	4	0	2	305	295	103.4	12	
7	Loughborough Lightning	6	1	0	5	262	311	84.2	3	
8	Team Northumbria	6	1	0	5	251	324	77.5	3	

== Playoffs ==
4th/5th place play-off

16 May 2013	Hertfordshire Mavericks	38–47	Manchester Thunder

Semi-finals

19 May 2013	Team Bath	53–43	Manchester Thunder	University of Bath	Sky Sports
19 May 2013	Scoring by quarter: 14–9, 25–22, 39–31, 52–50			University of Bath	Sky Sports
19 May 2013	Pamela Cookey 27/30 (90%); Kadeen Corbin 26/33 (79%)		Janelle Lawson 25/31 (81%); Kathryn Turner 8/12 (67%); Krista Enziano 2/2 (100%); Alice Travis 8/10 (80%)	University of Bath	Sky Sports

20 May 2013	Celtic Dragons	65–52	Surrey Storm	Sport Wales National Centre
20 May 2013	Scoring by quarter: 19–12, 31–30, 50–36, 65–52			Sport Wales National Centre

== Grand Final ==
25 May 2013	Team Bath	62–56	Celtic Dragons	University of Worcester Arena, Worcester; Attendance: 1,506; Umpires: Gary Burgess and Tracy Smith	Sky Sports
25 May 2013	Scoring by quarter: 16–15, 30–31, 46–44, 62–56			University of Worcester Arena, Worcester; Attendance: 1,506; Umpires: Gary Burgess and Tracy Smith	Sky Sports
25 May 2013	Pamela Cookey 37/41 (90%); Kadeen Corbin 25/38 (66%)		Lottysha Cato 54/58 (93%); Cara Moseley 2/4	University of Worcester Arena, Worcester; Attendance: 1,506; Umpires: Gary Burgess and Tracy Smith	Sky Sports
