= Europe Netball =

Netball governing body

- Sport: Netball
- Jurisdiction: Europe
- Membership: 16 (2025)
- Founded: 1989
- Affiliation: World Netball

Official website
- www.europenetball.com

Europe Netball is the main governing body for netball in Europe. It is affiliated to World Netball. It was originally founded in 1989 as the Federation of European Netball Associations. Between 2009 and 2019 it was known as Netball Europe. It is responsible for organising the Netball Europe Open Championships, Europe Netball Open Challenge and Netball World Cup Qualifiers. It also organises competitions for under-17, under-19 and under-21 national teams.

== History ==
The Federation of European Netball Associations was established in 1989 after the International Federation of Netball Associations decided it wanted to create five regional federations representing Africa, the Americas, Asia, Europe and Oceania. The first meeting of FENA was held at the Britannia Ringway Hotel, Manchester.

== Board ==
Europe Netball is administrated by a board that includes two former England netball internationals, Lyn Carpenter and Maggie Jackson.

== Competitions ==
Years	Competition
1998–2019	Netball Europe Open Championships
2007–	Netball World Cup Qualifiers – Europe
2008–	Europe Netball Open Challenge

== Members ==
Full Members

Team	Association
England	England Netball
France	Netball France
Gibraltar	Gibraltar Netball Association
Isle of Man	
Israel	
Italy	
Malta	Malta Netball Association
Northern Ireland	Netball Northern Ireland
Republic of Ireland	Netball Ireland
Scotland	Netball Scotland
Switzerland	Swiss Netball
United Arab Emirates	UAE Netball Federation
Wales	Wales Netball

Europe Netball Emerging Members

Team	Association
Portugal	
Sweden	
Qatar	

Other netball nations

Team	Association
Austria	
Denmark	
Germany	
Guernsey	Guernsey Netball Association
Jersey	
Netherlands	
Spain	
Turkey	
Ukraine	
