= Republic of Ireland national netball team =

National netball team

Republic of Ireland
- Nickname(s): Emeralds
- Association: Netball Ireland
- Confederation: Europe Netball
- Head coach: Teresa Gillespie
- Captain: Fran Duffy
- World ranking: 28th
Team colours	Alternate

Netball World Cup
- Appearances: 4 (Debuted in 1979)
- 1995 placing: 25th
- Best result: 10th (1979, 1991)

The Republic of Ireland national netball team, also referred to as the Ireland national netball team, represents Netball Ireland in international netball tournaments. They regularly compete in the Europe Netball Open Challenge and the Netball Singapore Nations Cup. They are the Challenge competitions most successful team. They have also featured in the Netball World Cup and the Netball Europe Open Championships. As of 3 June 2026, the Republic of Ireland are listed 28th on the World Netball Rankings.

== Tournament history ==
=== Netball World Cup ===
The Republic of Ireland have competed in four Netball World Cups tournaments. The highest position they have finished is 10th which they achieved twice, in 1979 and 1991.

Tournaments	Place
1979 World Netball Tournament	10th
1987 World Netball Tournament	15th
1991 World Netball Championships	10th
1995 World Netball Championships	25th

=== Netball World Cup Qualifiers ===
Tournaments	Place
2014 Netball Europe Open Championships	4th^{1}
2023 Netball World Cup Regional Qualifier – Europe	5th

=== Netball Europe Open Championships ===
Tournaments	Place
2014 Netball Europe Open Championships	4th^{1}
2019 Netball Europe Open Championships	4th

Notes

- ^1 The 2014 Netball Europe Open Championships also served as a qualifier for the 2015 Netball World Cup.

=== Europe Netball Open Challenge ===
Tournaments	Place
2008 Netball Europe Festival	
2010 Netball Europe Festival	1st
2012 Netball Europe Festival	1st
2013 Netball Europe Open Challenge	1st
2015 Netball Europe Open Challenge	1st
2016 Netball Europe Open Challenge	2nd
2017 Netball Europe Open Challenge	1st
2018 Netball Europe Open Challenge	1st
2019 Netball Europe Open Challenge	3rd
2022 Europe Netball Open Challenge	1st
2023 Europe Netball Open Challenge	2nd
2024 Europe Netball Open Challenge	3rd

=== Netball Singapore Nations Cup ===
Tournaments	Place
2012 Netball Singapore Nations Cup	6th
2013 Netball Singapore Nations Cup	5th
2014 Netball Singapore Nations Cup	6th
2016 Netball Singapore Nations Cup	5th
2017 Netball Singapore Nations Cup	4th
2019 Netball Singapore Nations Cup	5th
2022 Netball Singapore Nations Cup	4th
2024 Netball Singapore Nations Cup	4th

=== Quad Nations Series ===
Tournaments	Place
2026 Quad Nations Series	1st

== Notable players ==
=== Current squad ===
This recent squad was selected for the 2026 Quad Nations Series.

Republic of Ireland roster
Players
Coaches

Name	Pos	DOB	Height	Club	Nat	Caps
Zara Anichebe	GD, GA		–	Academy Netball Club	(England)
Meabh Brannigan	WA		–	Chevrons Netball Club	(England)
Millie Cox	GA, GS		–	Capital NUNS	(England)
Fran Duffy (c)	GA, WA		–	Sheffield Steel	(England)
Emma Eccles	WA		–	London Pulse	(England)
Emily Michell	WD, GD		–	Netball Academy	(England)
Sophie Murray	GA, GS		–	Sussex Thunder	(England)
Annie O'Rourke	GD, WD		–	Team Bath Toucans	(England)
Erin Peters (vc)	C, WD		–	Capital NUNS	(England)
Seren Redmond	WA, C, WD		–	Worcester Netball Club	(England)
Sophie Taylor	GA, GS		–	Hatfield Netball Club	(England)
Grace Waller	C, WD		–	YMCA Magic	(England)

Head coach

- ??

Notes

- (c) – Captain
- (cc) – Co-captain
- (vc) – Vice-captain
- – Injury / maternity leave
- (TRP) – Temporary Replacement Player

=== Captains ===
Captains	Years
Jane Digby	1979
Kathleen Dunleavy	1987, 1991
Niamh Murphy	2012–202x
Fran Duffy	202x–

=== Former players ===
- Tania Rosser, Ireland women's rugby union international

== Head coaches ==
Coach	Years
Joanne Moles	1979
Rosemary Mayes	1991
Jean Watson	1995
Teresa Gillespie	

== Honours ==
- Europe Netball Open Challenge
  - Winners: 2010, 2012, 2013, 2015, 2017, 2018, 2022
  - Runners Up: 2016, 2023
