= Nia Jones =

Welsh netball and association football player

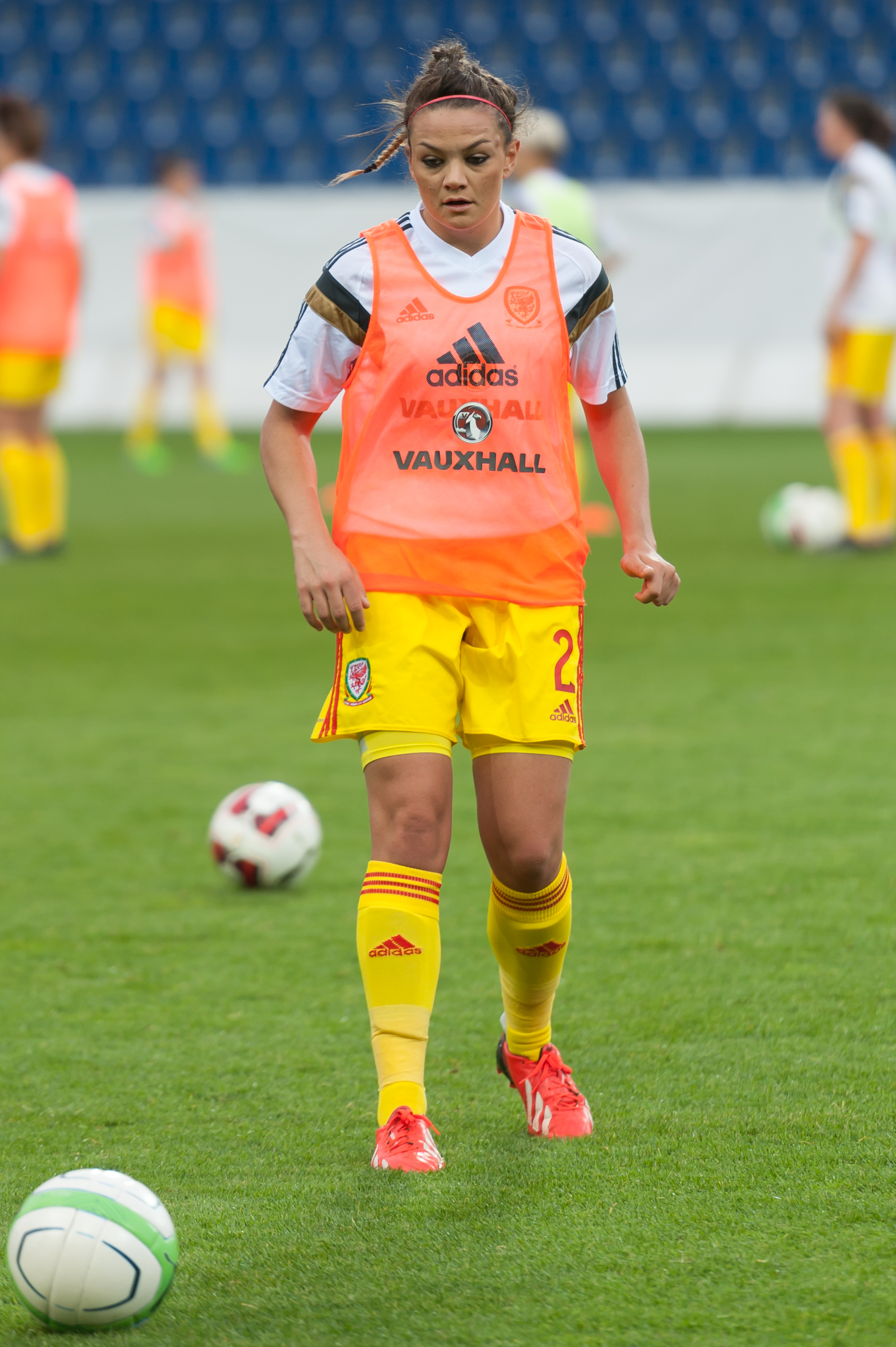
- Nia Jones 2015

Personal information
- Full name: Nia Cerys Wynn Jones
- Date of birth: 6 April 1992 (age 34)
- Place of birth: Wrexham, Wales
- Height: 1.70 m (5 ft 7 in)
- Position: Defender

Youth career
- Northop Hall Girls

Senior career*
Years	Team	Apps	(Gls)
2010–2015	Cardiff City		
2015–2017	Reading		
2017	Yeovil Town	8	(0)
2023	Pontypridd United	2	(0)
2024–2025	Swansea City	18	(2)

International career
2008–2009	Wales U17	4	(0)
2010	Wales U19	3	(3)
2010–2016	Wales	30	(2)
- * Club domestic league appearances and goals as of 10:37, 15 August 2017 (UTC)

Nia Jones (born 6 April 1992) is a former athlete who has represented Wales internationally at both netball and football. She won the FAW Young Player of the Year Award in 2011. She was nominated for the SportingWales Magazine and UWIC Rising Star Award in 2013.

== Early and personal life ==
Jones was born in Wrexham. After attending school at Ysgol Maes Garmon she later studied Sports and PE at the University of Wales Institute, Cardiff.

== Netball career ==
Nia Jones
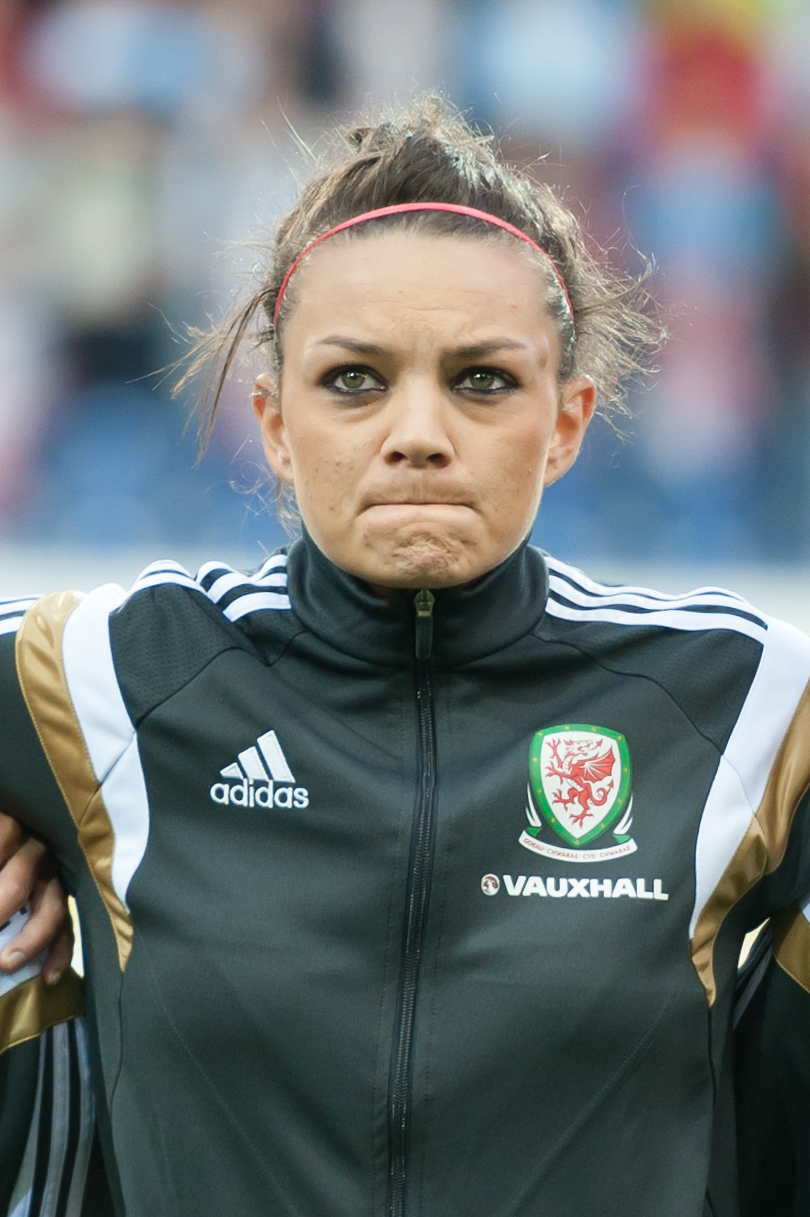

Personal information
- Born: 6 April 1992 (age 34) Wrexham, Wales
- Height: 1.70 m (5 ft 7 in)
- School: Ysgol Maes Garmon
- University: University of Wales Institute, Cardiff

Netball career
- Playing positions: GD, WD
Years	Club team	Apps
Years	National team	Caps
2012–2019	Wales	

Jones plays netball as either goal defence or wing defence. She began her career at Mold Netball Club, and she captained the Welsh national teams at under-17 and under-21 youth level. She also played for Manchester Thunder Youth and Junior Dragons. She was also Co-Captain of the Wales Senior Team.

She was captain of the Celtic Dragons for their 2019 Super League season.

During the 2021–2022 season she captained the Celtic Dragons, before moving to play for the Leeds Rhinos in the 2022–2023 season. For the 2023–2024 season she returned to Cardiff Dragons (renamed from the Celtic Dragons in August 2023).

Jones played for the Welsh Feathers, and was a squad member at the 2013 Netball Europe Open Championship where they won Gold. She was also part of Team Wales at the 2014 and 2018 Commonwealth Games. In 2015, she was not selected for the Netball World Cup team due to clashes between netball training and an international football fixture. In 2017, she was selected for the Celtic Flames, playing in an International Super Cup competition.

She was captain of the Welsh Feathers during the 2023 Netball World Cup, hosted in South Africa.

In 2024, after the Cardiff Dragons failed to renew her contract for the 2024–2025 season, she decided not to trial for the Welsh National Team, and subsequently announced her retirement from professional netball.

== Football career ==
Jones began her career at Northop Hall Girls, and played for Wales at under-17, under-19 and under-21 level before scoring on her senior debut aged 18, as a substitute in an 8–1 victory over Bulgaria in 2010.

She played club football for Cardiff City, before moving to Reading in the FAWSL in July 2015. She left Reading when her contract expired in 2016. She has also played numerous times at senior international level for Wales. Since 2018, Jones has been a regular pundit and co-commentator at Welsh International matches on behalf of BBC Sport Wales, having also attended the FIFA World Cup in Qatar.

On 5 September 2024, Jones signed for Adran Premier club Swansea City on a semi-professional contract for the upcoming season.
