= Malta national netball team =

Malta
- World ranking: 37
Team colours

The Malta national netball team participates in international tournaments, representing the country of Malta. They are part of Netball Europe and a full member of the International Netball Federation (INF). They are also associate members of FENA (Federation of European Netball Associations). Malta achieved an International Ranking position in 2012. As of 7 March 2018, they are ranked 37th in the INF World Rankings. The Netball Association of Malta is located is located in Sliema, Malta. The President is Ms. Sandra Farrugia, and the Secretary is Ms. Josianne Gatt. Helga Turban is the head coach of the U21 side.

The Malta Netball Association league is played every Sunday at Kirkop Complex. There are 3 divisions playing, 1st, 2nd and Under 21s.

Malta participated in the World Youth Netball Championships held in Glasgow, Scotland in 2013. They played against the following teams:

- Northern Ireland
- New Zealand
- Trinidad and Tobago
- Bermuda

In 2012, the U21 team competed in the Euro Championships, beating Northern Ireland 47-30. This was followed by a loss to England 65-22. Malta's Holly Robinson was voted the best player of the tournament.
