= Gibraltar national netball team =

Gibraltar
- Confederation: Netball Europe
- World ranking: 33 ▼
Team colours

Netball World Cup
- Appearances: none

Commonwealth Games
- Appearances: none

The Gibraltar national netball team represents Gibraltar in international netball. They are also known as the Gibraltar Netball Campions.

== Europe Netball Open Challenge ==
Tournaments	Place
2012 European Netball Festival	3rd
2013 Netball Europe Open Challenge	3rd
2016 Netball Europe Open Challenge	6th
2018 Netball Europe Open Challenge	4th
2019 Netball Europe Open Challenge	2nd
2021 Europe Netball Open Challenge	4th
2022 Europe Netball Open Challenge	4th
2023 Europe Netball Open Challenge	5th
2024 Europe Netball Open Challenge	5th
