= Test match (netball) =

A test match in netball is an international match played between two senior national netball teams. International netball tournaments such as the Netball World Cup, Netball at the Commonwealth Games, the Taini Jamison Trophy, the Constellation Cup and the Netball Quad Series all feature a series' of test matches.

On 20 August 1938, at Royal Park, Melbourne, Australia defeated New Zealand 40–11. This was the first netball Test between Australia and New Zealand. It was also the world's first international netball match. The 1949 England Scotland Wales Netball Series saw England, Scotland and Wales all play their debut test matches.

The use of the term test is relatively new to netball in comparison to cricket, rugby union and rugby league. It is effectively a loanword. Netball tests are regularly played between Australia, New Zealand, England, and South Africa, all of whom have a long history of using the term in other sports.
