= Netball Europe Open Championships =

International netball competition

- Sport: Netball
- Founded: 1998
- First season: 1998
- Organising body: Europe Netball
- Most recent champion: England
- Most titles: England
- Broadcasters: BBC Sport; YouTube
- Related competitions: Netball World Cup Qualifiers – Europe; Europe Netball Open Challenge

The Netball Europe Open Championships was an international netball tournament organised by Netball Europe. It was originally known as the FENA Open. It was sometimes referred to as the European Netball Championship. Its main four participants were England, Northern Ireland, Scotland and Wales. England were the competitions most successful team, winning nearly every tournament. Later tournaments also featured guest teams from outside Europe such as Fiji, South Africa and Trinidad and Tobago. Second-level teams affiliated to Europe Netball compete in the Europe Netball Open Challenge.

== History ==
=== FENA Open ===
Tournaments	Winners	Runners up	3rd	4th	5th
1998					
1999					
2000	England				
2001	Wales				
2002					
2003					
2004					
2005	England	Wales			
2006	England	Wales			
2007	England	Wales	Scotland	Northern Ireland	
2008	England	Scotland	Northern Ireland	Wales	

=== Netball Europe Open Championships ===
Tournaments	Winners	Runners up	3rd	4th	5th	6th
2009	England	Scotland	Northern Ireland	Wales		
2010	England	Wales	Scotland	Northern Ireland		
2011	England	Wales	Northern Ireland	Scotland		
2012	England	Northern Ireland	Wales	Scotland		
2013	Wales	England	Northern Ireland	Scotland		
2014	Wales	Scotland	Northern Ireland	Republic of Ireland		
2015	England	South Africa	Wales	Northern Ireland	Trinidad and Tobago	Scotland
2016	England	Wales	Scotland	Northern Ireland		
2017	England	Northern Ireland	Scotland	Wales	Fiji	
2019	England	Wales	Northern Ireland	Republic of Ireland		
