= World Netball Rankings =

Ranking system for national netball teams

The World Netball Rankings are a ranking system for national netball teams. They were originally known as the IFNA World Rankings and previously known as the INF World Rankings. They are published by World Netball. They were first introduced in February 2008 and have been developed and maintained by the cricket statistician, David Kendix. Australia and New Zealand have dominated the World Netball Rankings. Between 2008 and 2018 they were the only two teams to have ever held the number one and/or number two places. In July 2018, England became the first team to break their dominance when they were ranked number two. In July 2019, Jamaica were ranked number two for the first time.

== Current rankings ==
Top 20 rankings as of 1 September 2026
Rank	Change	Team	Played	Weighted	Points	Rating
1	Steady	Australia	43	30	6,269	209
2	Steady	New Zealand	45	32	6,503	203
3	Steady	England	47	31	5,744	185
4	Steady	Jamaica	35	26	4,730	182
5	Steady	South Africa	49	35	5,811	166
6	Steady	Uganda	40	28	3,827	137
7	▲1	Tonga	34	20	2,352	118
8	▲1	Malawi	37	24	2,778	116
9	▼2	Wales	29	21	2,361	112
10	Steady	Scotland	29	21	2,262	108
11	Steady	Zimbabwe	36	24	2,242	93
12	Steady	Trinidad and Tobago	21	16	1,393	87
13	Steady	Samoa	20	10	858	86
14	▲1	Namibia	30	23	1,807	79
15	▼1	Northern Ireland	27	20	1,562	78
16	Steady	Fiji	27	14	1,093	78
17	Steady	Zambia	16	8	619	77
18	Steady	Saint Vincent and the Grenadines	22	14	1,061	76
19	Steady	Barbados	31	21	1,436	68
20	Steady	Gibraltar	14	9	569	63

== History ==
=== Australia ===
Australia is regularly ranked number one in the World Netball Rankings. They have never dropped below number two.

=== New Zealand ===
New Zealand is regularly ranked number two in the World Netball Rankings. In January 2011, after winning the 2010 Commonwealth Games tournament, they replaced Australia at the top of the rankings for the first time. In 2013 they were again ranked number one. After finishing fourth at the 2018 Commonwealth Games, New Zealand dropped, for the first time in their history, to third. In July 2019, they dropped to fourth. However, after winning the 2019 Netball World Cup, they moved back up to second.

=== England ===
Between 2008 and 2018, England was regularly ranked number three in the World Netball Rankings. In May 2018, after winning gold at the 2018 Commonwealth Games, they initially remained at number three. However in July 2018, they moved up to number two. This saw England became the first team to be ranked in the top two apart from Australia and New Zealand. After finishing as runners up at the 2019 Netball Quad Series and defeating both Australia and New Zealand, England returned to the number two position. In October 2024, England were ranked number two for a third time after defeating Australia in Australia during their 2024 series and then winning the 2024 Taini Jamison Trophy Series.

=== Jamaica ===
Between 2008 and 2018, Jamaica was regularly ranked number four in the World Netball Rankings. However, in July 2019, they were ranked number two for the first time. During the early 2020s they have regularly challenged England for the number three position.

=== Wales ===
Between 2008 and 2024, Wales averaged 9th in the World Netball Rankings. In September 2017, they were listed 7th. In March 2022, they qualified for the 2022 Commonwealth Games after being ranked 8th. In March 2025 they were listed 6th for the first time.

== Qualification ==
=== Fast5 Netball World Series ===
The top six teams, based on the World Netball Rankings, are invited to play in the Fast5 Netball World Series.

=== Commonwealth Games ===
Teams qualified for the 2018, 2022 and 2026 Commonwealth Games based on their World Netball Rankings.

=== Netball World Cup ===
The top six ranked teams qualified automatically for the 2019 and 2023 Netball World Cups.

== Calculation ==
All test matches played by a team in the last four years, including matches in the Netball World Cup and Netball at the Commonwealth Games, are considered in the calculation. The ranking of teams is determined by comparing teams' ratings, which is the average points earned per match in the last four years.

=== Points per match ===
Teams earn points for each match, with the specific amount determined based on the outcome of the match (win or loss) and the rating of their opponents.

- In matches between teams within 40 rating points of each other, winning a game earns a team 50 more points than their opponent's current rating, while losing a match earns a team 50 points less than their opponent's current rating.
- In matches between teams more than 40 rating points apart, an exception is applied where the rating of a team's opponent is treated as if it is exactly 40 points apart for the purpose of the calculation. That is, higher-rated team would have their opponent possess a rating of 40 points less than them, while the lower-rated team would have their opponent possess a rating of 40 above them.

A team's rating always increases following a victory and decreases after a loss. However, winning against a higher-ranked team increases a team's rating more and losing against a lower-ranked team decreases a team's rating more.

=== Weighting ===
In the calculation of a team's rating, the points earned for each game are weighted based on the time the match was played.

- Matches played in the two most recent years before the time of calculation are weighted at 100%.
- Matches played three to four years before the time of calculation are weighted at 50%.
