= All Sectors Netball League =

Top level netball league in Trinidad and Tobago

- Sport: Netball
- Founded: 1990
- First season: 1991
- No. of teams: 22 (2026)
- Country: Trinidad and Tobago
- Venues: Eastern Regional Indoor Sports Arena; Tacarigua
- Most recent champion: UTT Patriots
- Sponsor: Courts
- Level on pyramid: 1–3
- Domestic cups: Courts Open Knockout; Jean Pierre Challenge Trophy; Steve Sarjeant Challenge Trophy
- Website: allsectorsnetballleague.com

The All Sectors Netball League is the top level netball league featuring teams from Trinidad and Tobago. It was formed in 1990 and is affiliated with the Trinidad and Tobago Netball Association. The league is effectively a business houses league and features teams representing public and private companies, government services and departments and universities. Due to sponsorship and naming rights arrangements, the league is widely known as the Courts All Sectors Netball League. As of 2026, the league features four divisions, including a Premiership and a men's netball division. Teams in the league also compete in numerous knockout competitions throughout the season, including a series of Fast5 knockouts. The number of teams in the league has regularly fluctuated and numerous teams have come and gone. However teams representing the Bermudez Biscuit Company, the Telecommunications Services of Trinidad and Tobago, the Trinidad and Tobago Defence Force, the Trinidad and Tobago Fire Service and the Trinidad and Tobago Police Service have participated in the majority of the seasons. During the Premiership era, UTT Patriots and Fire Service have been the league's most successful teams. Between 2012 and 2024, Patriots and Fire and won every Premiership title between them.

== History ==
=== Early years ===
The All Sectors Netball League was formed in 1990. Its founding members included Jean Pierre, the former Trinidad and Tobago international. At the 1979 World Netball Tournament, she was a member of the Trinidad and Tobago team that shared the gold medal with Australia and New Zealand. However, since then, netball in Trinidad and Tobago had been in decline. The founders hoped to promote netball by encouraging working women to play. In 1991, the league started with thirteen teams and two divisions – the Championship Division and the Alternative Division. In 2004, the Retro Division, featuring over–40s players was added.

The number of teams in the league has regularly fluctuated and numerous teams have come and gone. However teams representing the Bermudez Biscuit Company, the Telecommunications Services of Trinidad and Tobago, the Trinidad and Tobago Defence Force, the Trinidad and Tobago Fire Service and the Trinidad and Tobago Police Service have participated in the majority of the seasons. Other teams to play in the league have represented the Tobago House of Assembly and San Juan Jabloteh F.C..

=== Premiership era ===
In 2011, the league expanded to three divisions when the Premiership Division was added at the top. During the Premiership era, UTT Patriots and Fire Service have been the league's most successful teams. Between 2012 and 2024, Patriots and Fire and won every Premiership league title between them. Between 2018 and 2020, Fire won three league titles in a row. With a team coached by Bridget Adams and featuring Onella Jack, Jameela McCarthy, Kalifa McCollin and Samantha Wallace, UTT also represented the league at the 2017 Netball New Zealand Super Club.

== Venue ==
Since 1998, the Eastern Regional Indoor Sports Arena in Tacarigua has served as the leagues home venue. Its original home venue was the Jean Pierre Sports Complex.

== 2026 teams and divisions ==
=== Premiership Division ===
Team	Business/Organisation	Colours
Defence Force	Trinidad and Tobago Defence Force	
Police Service	Trinidad and Tobago Police Service	
Reboot Tigers		
UTC Sparks	Unit Trust Corporation	
UTT Patriots	University of Trinidad and Tobago	

=== Championship Division ===
Team	Business/Organisation	Colours
Bermudez United	Bermudez Biscuit Company	
Defence Force	Trinidad and Tobago Defence Force	
Fire Youth	Trinidad and Tobago Fire Service	
Police Service	Trinidad and Tobago Police Service	
Reboot Tigers		
USC Hummers	University of the Southern Caribbean	
UTT Patriots	University of Trinidad and Tobago	
UWI	University of the West Indies	

=== Alternative Division ===
Team	Business/Organisation	Colours
Police Service	Trinidad and Tobago Police Service	
Police Netball Youth Club	Trinidad and Tobago Police Service	
UTC Sparks	Unit Trust Corporation	
UTT Patriots	University of Trinidad and Tobago	
UWI	University of the West Indies	

=== Men's Division ===
Team	Business/Organisation	Colours
Bermudez United	Bermudez Biscuit Company	
Defence Force	Trinidad and Tobago Defence Force	
Police Service	Trinidad and Tobago Police Service	
Reboot Tigers		

== Competitions ==
=== Divisions and Tournaments ===
Competition	History and format
Opening Day Knockouts	These are the fast-paced, opening matches played immediately after the season opening ceremony. These matches are typically played in a shortened format. In 2025, these matches comprised two halves at four minutes each. Each division had its own separate competition.
Premiership Division	The league's first level division. It was introduced in 2012. It typically features 4/5 teams playing two rounds of Round Robin matches. Matches use the regular rules of netball and are one hour. In recent seasons, cash prizes have been awarded to the winners.
Championship Division	The league's second level division. It typically features 7/8 teams playing one round of Round Robin matches. Matches use the regular rules of netball and are one hour.
Alternative Division	The league's third level division. It typically features 7/8 teams playing one round of Round Robin matches. However, matches are forty minutes, four quarters of ten minutes each. It has featured up to 12 teams. On these occasions the teams were subdivided into X and Y divisions and playoffs were used to decide the overall winners.
Retro Division	Introduced in 2004, it features over–40s players. It has previously featured 4/6 teams playing two rounds of Round Robin matches. Matches are forty minutes, four quarters of ten minutes each. In recent seasons, the division has struggled to recruit enough teams and it was not played in 2024, 2025 or 2026.
Men's Division	Ahead of the 2026 season, a men's netball division featuring four teams was introduced.
Courts Open Knockout	The leagues main open single-elimination tournament. It features Premiership, Championship, and Alternative teams. It features two halves of twenty minutes. Since 2019, the competition has featured mixed teams. Each team can register a maximum of five male players.
Steve Sarjeant Challenge Trophy	Introduced in 2012 as a knockout competition for the new Premiership Division. It was named in honour of Stevenson Sarjeant, who in 1990 was a founding member of the league.
Jean Pierre Challenge Trophy	Introduced in 2003 as a knockout competition for the Championship Division teams. It was named in honour of Jean Pierre, the former Trinidad and Tobago netball international, who in 1990 was a founding member of the league. Fire Service were the inaugural winners.
Divisional Knockout	This is as a knockout competition for Alternative Division teams. It features two halves of fifteen minutes each.
Fast5 Knockouts	The league embraced the new fastnet, and then the revised Fast5 netball rules early on. Since 2010, each Division has played a fastnet or Fast5 competition. The winners receive a Justin Bowen trophy. Bowen is a former Chief Fire Officer with the Trinidad and Tobago Fire Service.

=== Winners ===
Season	Premiership	Championship	Alternative	Open Knockout	Steve Sarjeant	Jean Pierre
1991						
1992						
1993						
1994						
1995						
1996						
1997						
1998						
1999						
2000		Police Service	Ministry of Education	Government Printery		
2001		Caribbean Facilities Corporation	TSTT	Defence Force		
2002		Defence Force	Police Service	Defence Force		
2003		Defence Force	Fire Service	Defence Force		Fire Service
2004		Police Service	Defence Force	Fire Service		POL/Fire ?
2005		Defence Force	Defence Force	Defence Force		Police Service
2006		Defence Force	Bermudez	Fire Service		Fire Service
2007		Police Service	Central Bank	Police Service		??
2008		Defence Force	Cilnetres	Police Service		UTT
2009		Fire Service	Fire Service	Fire Service		Defence Force
2010		UTT	Bermudez	Fire Service		Police Service
2011		UTT	Bermudez United	UTT		UTT
2012	UTT	Fire Service	TSTT	Fire Service	Fire Service	Fire Service
2013	UTT	Bermudez United	UTT	UTT	Police Service	Police Service
2014	Fire Service	Fire Service	UTT	Police Service	Police Service	Police Service
2015	UTT	Police Service	UTT	UTT	UTT	Police Service
2016	UTT	Fire Service	TSTT	UTT	UTT	UTT
2017	Police Service	Police Service	Fire Service	Police Service	Fire Service	UTC Sparks
2018	Fire Service	UTC Sparks	Fire Service	UTT	Fire Service	UTC Sparks
2019	Fire Service	Bermudez	MIC Tigers	Police Youth Club	Fire Service	Bermudez
2020	Fire Service	Fire Service ?	TTPost	Fire Service	Fire Service	Fire Service
2023	Fire Service	UTC Sparks	MIC Tigers	Fire Service	Fire Service	UTC Sparks
2024	UTT Patriots^{1}	Jabloteh	USC Hummers	UTT Patriots	UTT Patriots	TTPost
2025	MIC Tigers^{2}	UWI	USC Hummers	UTT Patriots	UTT Patriots	UTT Patriots
2026	UTT Patriots	UWI Lions	UTT Patriots	UTT Patriots	UTT Patriots	UTT Patriots

Notes

- ^1 In 2020 sports teams representing the University of Trinidad and Tobago became known as the UTT Patriots.
- ^2 MIC Tigers represented the Metal Industries Company/MIC Institute of Technology. However, ahead of the 2026 season, they relaunched as Reboot Tigers.

== Notable players ==
=== Internationals ===
Trinidad and Tobago

- Tia Bruno
- Kielle Connelly
- Joelisa Cooper
- Candice Guerero
- Rhonda John-Davis
- Onella Jack
- Jameela McCarthy
- Kalifa McCollin
- Daystar Swift
- Samantha Wallace

=== MVPs ===
Season	Player	Team
1991	Lystra Zamore	
1992	Hazel Taylor	
1993	Carlette Nurse	
1994	Charmaine Lord	
1995	Hazel Taylor	
1996	Lystra Zamore	
1997	Monica Maule	
1998	Melinda Mitchell	
1999	Simone Morgan	
2000	Donna Elise Charles	
2001	Janelle Barker	
2002	Lystra Solomon	
2003	Denesha Moses	
2004	Crystal George	
2005	Janelle Barker	
2006	Garbrel Selman	
2007	Simone Bowen Sandy	
2008	Crystal George	UTT
2009	Rhonda John-Davis	Defence Force
2010	Rhonda John-Davis	Police Service
2011	Joelisa Cooper	Fire Service
2012	Candice Guerero	UTT
2013	Candice Guerero	UTT
2014	Onella Jack	Fire Service
2015	Kielle Connelly	UTT
2016	Candice Guerero	UTT
2017	Rhonda John-Davis	Police Service
2018	Onella Jack	Fire Service
2019	Onella Jack	Fire Service
2020	Joelisa Cooper	Fire Service
2023	Tia Bruno	Police Service
2024	Kalifa McCollin	UTT Patriots
2025	Kalifa McCollin	UTT Patriots
2026	Kalifa McCollin	UTT Patriots

== Title sponsors ==
Sponsors	Seasons
Unicomer Group/Courts	1996–
