= Trinidad and Tobago at the 2014 Commonwealth Games =

- CGF code: TTO
- CGA: Trinidad and Tobago Olympic Committee
- Website: ttoc.org

in Glasgow, Scotland
- Flag bearer: Keshorn Walcott
- Medals Ranked 22nd: Gold 0 Silver 3 Bronze 5 Total 8

Commonwealth Games appearances (overview)
- 1934; 1938; 1950; 1954; 1958; 1962; 1966; 1970; 1974; 1978; 1982; 1986; 1990; 1994; 1998; 2002; 2006; 2010; 2014; 2018; 2022; 2026; 2030

Trinidad and Tobago competed in the 2014 Commonwealth Games in Glasgow, Scotland from 23 July to 3 August 2014. With the exception of the athletics squad, which was to be announced at a later date, the Trinidad and Tobago Olympic Committee revealed that they had selected a team of 84 athletes across 13 sports. On 29 June a track and field squad of 43 was named completing a team of 127 athletes.

== Athletics ==
On 29 June, the Trinidad and Tobago Commonwealth Games Association and the Trinidad and Tobago Olympic Committee announced their track and field team.

=== Men ===
| Athlete | Event | Round 1 | | Semifinal | | Final | |
| Athlete | Event | Result | Rank | Result | Rank | Result | Rank |
|---|---|---|---|---|---|---|---|
| Keston Bledman | 100 m | 10.16 | 1 Q | 10.24 | 3 | did not advance | |
| Darrel Brown | 100 m | did not start | | did not advance | | | |
| Richard Thompson | 100 m | 10.33 | 3 q | 10.19 | 3 | did not advance | |
| Kyle Greaux | 200 m | 20.79 | 3 q | 20.93 | 7 | did not advance | |
| Jereem Richards | 200 m | 21.13 | 3 | did not advance | | | |
| Rondel Sorrillo | 200 m | 20.98 | 3 q | 20.57 | 3 | did not advance | |
| Lalonde Gordon | 400 m | 45.84 | 2 Q | 45.37 | 1 Q | 44.78 SB | 3rd place, bronze medalist(s) |
| Renny Quow | 400 m | 45.86 | 1 Q | 45.47 | 3 q | did not finish | |
| Jarrin Solomon | 400 m | 45.69 | 1 Q | 45.49 | 2 Q | 45.82 | 6 |
| Kendis Bullard | 800 m | 1:51.57 | 6 | did not advance | | | |
| Jamaal James | 800 m | 1:51.62 | 4 | did not advance | | | |
| Durell Busby | 110 metres hurdles | did not start | | —N/a | | did not advance | |
| Wayne Davis | 110 metres hurdles | did not start | | —N/a | | did not advance | |
| Mikel Thomas | 110 metres hurdles | 13.86 | 4 | —N/a | | did not advance | |
| Jehue Gordon | 400 metres hurdles | 49.42 | 1 Q | —N/a | | 48.75 SB | 2nd place, silver medalist(s) |
| Emanuel Mayers | 400 metres hurdles | 50.51 | 5 | —N/a | | did not advance | |
| Keston Bledman; Marc Burns; Rondel Sorrillo; Richard Thompson | 4 x 100 metres relay | 38.33 | 1 Q | —N/a | | 38.10 | 3rd place, bronze medalist(s) |
| Lalonde Gordon; Jarrin Solomon; Jehue Gordon (Heat Only); Zwede Hewitt; Renny Quow (Final Only) | 4 x 400 metres relay | 3:04.06 | 1 Q | —N/a | | 3:01.51 | 3rd place, bronze medalist(s) |

| Athlete | Event | Qualification | | Final | |
| Athlete | Event | Distance | Rank | Distance | Rank |
|---|---|---|---|---|---|
| Kyron Blaise | Long jump | No Mark | | did not advance | |
| Robert Collingwood | Shot put | 17.83 | 13 | did not advance | |
| Keshorn Walcott | Javelin throw | 85.28 NR | 1 Q | 82.67 | 2nd place, silver medalist(s) |

=== Women ===
| Athlete | Event | Round 1 | | Semifinal | | Final | |
| Athlete | Event | Result | Rank | Result | Rank | Result | Rank |
|---|---|---|---|---|---|---|---|
| Michelle-Lee Ahye | 100 m | 11.52 | 2 Q | did not start | | did not advance | |
| Kamaria Durant | 100 m | 11.80 | 4 q | 11.70 | 8 | did not advance | |
| Kai Selvon | 100 m | 11.66 | 4 q | 11.59 | 6 | did not advance | |
| Reyare Thomas | 200 m | 23.25 SB | 3 Q | 23.35 | 3 | did not advance | |
| Shawna Fermin | 400 m | 54.10 | 5 q | 53.83 SB | 7 | did not advance | |
| Romona Modeste | 400 m | 55.16 | 6 | did not advance | | | |
| Domonique Williams | 400 m | 54.43 | 3 Q | 54.63 | 8 | did not advance | |
| Aleena Brooks | 800 m | 2.06.33 | 6 | did not advance | | | |
| Tonya Nero | 10,000 metres | —N/a | | | | 35:48.63 SB | 12 |
| Deborah John | 100 metres hurdles | 13.63 | 5 | —N/a | | did not advance | |
| Josanne Lucas | 100 metres hurdles | 13.38 | 2 Q | —N/a | | 13.41 | 7 |
| Janeil Bellille | 400 metres hurdles | 57.51 | 4 | —N/a | | did not advance | |
| Josanne Lucas | 400 metres hurdles | DQ | | —N/a | | did not advance | |
| Deborah John; Rayare Thomas; Lisa Wickham; Kamaria Durant | 4 x 100 metres relay | 44.47 | 3 Q | —N/a | | 44.78 | 8 |
| Shawna Fermin; Domonique Williams; Janeil Bellille; Romona Modeste | 4 x 400 metres relay | 3:33.26 | 3 Q | —N/a | | 3:33.50 | 6 |

| Athlete | Event | Qualification | | Final | |
| Athlete | Event | Distance | Position | Distance | Position |
|---|---|---|---|---|---|
| Ayanna Alexander | Long jump | 5.77 | 23 | did not advance | |
| Ayanna Alexander | Triple jump | 13.78 | 2 Q | 14.01 | 3rd place, bronze medalist(s) |
| Deandra Daniel | High jump | 1.76 | 17 | did not advance | |
| Annie Alexander | Shot put | —N/a | | No Mark | |
| Cleopatra Borel | Shot put | —N/a | | 18.57 | 2nd place, silver medalist(s) |
| Annie Alexander | Discus throw | 47.73 | 15 | did not advance | |

== Boxing ==
- Michael Alexander
- Aaron Prince

== Cycling ==
=== Track ===
Sprint

| Athlete | Event | Qualification | | Round 1 | Repechage | Quarterfinals | Semifinals | Final | |
| Athlete | Event | Time Speed (km/h) | Rank | Opposition Time Speed (km/h) | Opposition Time Speed (km/h) | Opposition Time | Opposition Time | Opposition Time | Rank |
|---|---|---|---|---|---|---|---|---|---|
| Quincy Alexander | Men's sprint | 10.774; 66.827 | 21 | did not advance | | | | | |
| Njisane Phillip | Men's sprint | 10.188; 70.671 | 9 Q | P Lewis (AUS); L | M Crampton (TRI); P Hindes (ENG); L | did not advance | | | |

Time trial

| Athlete | Event | Time | Rank |
|---|---|---|---|
| Quincy Alexander | Men's time trial | 1:03.679 | 10 |

Keirin

| Athlete | Event | Round 1 | Repechage | Semifinals | Final |
| Athlete | Event | Rank | Rank | Rank | Rank |
|---|---|---|---|---|---|
| Quincy Alexander | Men's keirin | 6 R | 4 | did not advance | |
| Njisane Phillip | Men's keirin | did not start | | | |

== Field hockey ==
=== Men's tournament ===
- Kwandwane Browne
- Ishmael Campbell
- Darren Cowie - Capt
- Shaquille Daniel
- Aidan De Gannes
- Solomon Eccles
- Dillet Gilkes
- Nicholas Grant
- Marcus James
- Tariq Marcano
- Stefan Mouttet
- Michael II Otis O'Connor
- Mickel Pierre
- Jordan Reynos
- Andrey Rocke
- Akim Toussaint

Pool B

| Team | Pld | W | D | L | GF | GA | GD | Pts | Qualification |
|---|---|---|---|---|---|---|---|---|---|
| New Zealand | 4 | 4 | 0 | 0 | 19 | 3 | +16 | 12 | Semi-finals |
| England | 4 | 3 | 0 | 1 | 18 | 5 | +13 | 9 | Semi-finals |
| Canada | 4 | 1 | 0 | 3 | 5 | 9 | −4 | 3 | |
| Malaysia | 4 | 1 | 0 | 3 | 6 | 18 | −12 | 3 | |
| Trinidad and Tobago | 4 | 1 | 0 | 3 | 6 | 19 | −13 | 3 | |

Source: FIH

24 July 2014
19:00

| England | 6–1 | Trinidad and Tobago |
|---|---|---|
| Jackson 7'; Lewers 25'; Gleghorne 27'; Catlin 51'; Roper 59'; Middleton 64' | Report | Pierre 29' |

Umpires:
Gareth Greenfield (NZL)
Gavin Caldecott (CAN)

26 July 2014
09:00

| New Zealand | 8–0 | Trinidad and Tobago |
|---|---|---|
| Burrows 7'; Haig 24', 34'; Neal 30', 68'; S. Child 40'; Inglis 54'; A. Shaw 59' | Report |

Umpires:
Raghu Prasad (IND)
Will Drury (WAL)

27 July 2014
19:00

| Canada | 3–1 | Trinidad and Tobago |
|---|---|---|
| Tupper 28'; Pearson 44'; Jameson 60' | Report | Browne 57' |

Umpires:
Lim Hong Zhen (SIN)
Haider Rasool (PAK)

29 July 2014
11:00

| Trinidad and Tobago | 4–2 | Malaysia |
|---|---|---|
| Pierre 8'; Browne 12', 16', 35+' | Report | Sumantri 25'; Rosli 70' |

Umpires:
Will Drury (WAL)
Gavin Caldecott (CAN)

=== Women's tournament ===
- Avion Ashton
- Kayla Braithwaithe
- Savanah De Fretias
- Dana-Lee De Gannes
- Petal Derry
- Amanda George
- Brianna Govia
- Zene Henry
- Brittney Hingh
- Kwylan Jaggassar
- Alanna Lewis - co-Capt
- Fiona O'Brien
- Amie Olton
- Elise Olton
- Tamia Roach
- Patricia Wright-Alexis - co-Capt

Pool A

| Team | Pld | W | D | L | GF | GA | GD | Pts | Qualification |
|---|---|---|---|---|---|---|---|---|---|
| New Zealand | 4 | 4 | 0 | 0 | 25 | 1 | +24 | 12 | Semi-finals |
| South Africa | 4 | 3 | 0 | 1 | 22 | 4 | +18 | 9 | Semi-finals |
| India | 4 | 2 | 0 | 2 | 20 | 8 | +12 | 6 | |
| Canada | 4 | 1 | 0 | 3 | 6 | 13 | −7 | 3 | |
| Trinidad and Tobago | 4 | 0 | 0 | 4 | 1 | 48 | −47 | 0 | |

24 July 2014
14:00

| South Africa | 16–0 | Trinidad and Tobago |
|---|---|---|
| Russell 8', 59'; Chamberlain 9', 30', 51', 55'; Damons 14', 41'; Evans 15', 36', 52'; Deetlefs 23'; Bright 34', 69'; Taylor 57', 64' | Report |

Umpires:
Dino Willox (WAL)
Miskarmalia Ariffin (SIN)

25 July 2014
19:00

| New Zealand | 14–0 | Trinidad and Tobago |
|---|---|---|
| Punt 3', 39'; Naylor 5'; Forgesson 5', 37', 49', 50'; Keddell 8'; Cocks 15'; Glynn 27', 42', 67'; Whitelock 35'; Webster 52' | Report |

Umpires:
Alex Walker (SCO)
Wendy Stewart (CAN)

27 July 2014
14:00

| Canada | 4–1 | Trinidad and Tobago |
|---|---|---|
| Stewart 28'; Stairs 34'; Gillis 56'; Johansen 70' | Report | Govia 67' |

Umpires:
Alex Walker (SCO)
Miskarmalia Ariffin (SIN)

28 July 2014
19:00

| Trinidad and Tobago | 0–14 | India |
|---|---|---|
| | Report | Katariya 4'; Thakur 11', 27', 64'; Rampal 12', 19', 25'; Kaur 18', 41', 48'; Rani 22'; Thokchom 31'; Barla 53'; Arya 68' |

Umpires:
Hannah Sanders (ENG)
Nor Hafizah Azman (MAS)

== Gymnastics ==
| Athlete | Event | Final | | | | | | | |
| Athlete | Event | Apparatus | | | | | | Total | Rank |
| Athlete | Event | F | PH | R | V | PB | HB | Total | Rank |
|---|---|---|---|---|---|---|---|---|---|
| William Albert | Individual | 10.700 | 8.566 | 13.866 | 13.566 | 11.700 | 11.933 | 70.331 | 24 |

- Marissa Dick
- Khazia Hislop

== Judo ==
| Athlete | Event | Round of 32 | Round of 16 | Quarterfinals | Semifinals | Repechage | Final / BM | |
| Athlete | Event | Opposition Result | Opposition Result | Opposition Result | Opposition Result | Opposition Result | Opposition Result | Rank |
|---|---|---|---|---|---|---|---|---|
| Christopher George | −100 kg | —N/a | Hussain Shah (PAK); L 0000-1001 | did not advance | | | | |

== Netball ==
- Janelle Barker
- Joelisa Cooper
- Rhonda John-Davis
- Kemba Duncan
- Candice Guerero
- Onella Jack
- Anika La Roche Brice
- Alicia Liverpool
- Tricia Liverpool
- Kalifa McCollin
- Daystar Swift
- Samantha Wallace

Pool B

| Team | Pld | W | L | PF | PA | PD | Pts | Qualification |
|---|---|---|---|---|---|---|---|---|
| Australia | 5 | 5 | 0 | 322 | 185 | +137 | 10 | Semi-finals |
| England | 5 | 4 | 1 | 293 | 160 | +133 | 8 | Semi-finals |
| South Africa | 5 | 3 | 2 | 249 | 222 | +27 | 6 | |
| Wales | 5 | 2 | 3 | 199 | 255 | −56 | 4 | |
| Trinidad and Tobago | 5 | 1 | 4 | 167 | 282 | −115 | 2 | |
| Barbados | 5 | 0 | 5 | 162 | 288 | −126 | 0 | |

Source: glasgow2014.com

24 July 2014
17:00

Report
Trinidad and Tobago
38 – 37
Barbados

SECC Precinct
Umpires:
Jonathan Bredin (NZL)
Michelle Phippard (AUS)
Reserve umpire:
Theresa Prince (RSA)
Barker 4/5 (80%)
Cooper 16/21 (76%)
McCollin 18/21 (86%)

Browne 8/8 (100%)
Piggott 7/11 (64%)
Thomas 19/26 (73%)
Wharton 3/6 (50%)

25 July 2014
15:00

Report
South Africa
56 – 40
Trinidad and Tobago

SECC Precinct
Umpires:
Gary Burgess (ENG)
Rachael Ayre (AUS)
Reserve umpire:
Jonathan Bredin (NZL)
Bootha 8/10 (80%)
Holtzhausen 8/10 (80%)
Myburgh 14/20 (70%)
Potgieter 26/31 (84%)

Cooper 15/17 (88%)
McCollin 10/11 (91%)
Wilson 15/17 (88%)

26 July 2014
19:00

Report
Wales
56 – 31
Trinidad and Tobago

SECC Precinct
Umpires:
Tracy Smith (ENG)
Clare McCabe (AUS)
Reserve umpire:
Ian Fuller (ENG)
James 12/19 (63%)
Lewis 31/40 (78%)
Moseley 7/9 (78%)

Barker 1/2 (50%)
Cooper 5/7 (71%)
McCollin 13/15 (87%)
Wilson 12/19 (63%)

28 July 2014
11:30

Report
Trinidad and Tobago
34 – 69
Australia

SECC Precinct
Umpires:
Tracy Smith (ENG)
Yvonne Morgan (NZL)
Reserve umpire:
Ian Fuller (ENG)
Cooper 15/24 (63%)
McCollin 10/15 (67%)
Wilson 9/13 (69%)

Bassett 21/23 (91%)
Caldwell 17/20 (85%)
Medhurst 10/14 (71%)
Thwaits 21/23 (91%)

29 July 2014
09:30

Report
England
70 – 24
Trinidad and Tobago

SECC Precinct
Umpires:
Marie-Louw Van Der Merve (RSA)
Clare McCabe (AUS)
Reserve umpire:
Yvonne Morgan (NZL)
Corbin 16/19 (84%)
Dunn 8/10 (80%)
Harten 35/43 (81%)
Housby 11/12 (92%)

Cooper 13/16 (81%)
McCollin 4/6 (67%)
Wilson 7/11 (64%)

== Rugby sevens ==
Trinidad and Tobago has qualified a rugby sevens team.

- Kelson Figaro
- David Gokool
- Rowell Gordon
- Aasan Lewis
- Anthony Lopez
- Jonathon O'Connor
- James Phillip
- Joseph Quashie - Capt
- Jesse Richards
- Agboola Silverthorn
- Shaquille Tull
- Keishon Walker

Pool B

| Team | Pld | W | D | L | PF | PA | PD | Pts | Qualification |
|---|---|---|---|---|---|---|---|---|---|
| South Africa | 3 | 3 | 0 | 0 | 106 | 0 | +106 | 9 | Medal competition |
| Kenya | 3 | 2 | 0 | 1 | 63 | 25 | +38 | 7 | Medal competition |
| Cook Islands | 3 | 1 | 0 | 2 | 33 | 88 | −55 | 5 | Bowl competition |
| Trinidad and Tobago | 3 | 0 | 0 | 3 | 15 | 104 | −89 | 3 | Bowl competition |

26 July 2014
12:22

| South Africa | 36–0 | Trinidad and Tobago |
| | Report |

Ibrox Stadium, Glasgow

26 July 2014
14:40

| Cook Islands | 33–10 | Trinidad and Tobago |
| | Report |

Ibrox Stadium, Glasgow

26 July 2014
19:52

| Kenya | 35–5 | Trinidad and Tobago |
| | Report |

Ibrox Stadium, Glasgow

== Shooting ==
- Rhodney Allen
- Roger Daniel
- Norris Gomez
- Marlon Moses
- Michael Perez

== Squash ==
- Charlotte Knaggs
- Colin Ramasra
- Kerrie Sample
- Kale Wilson

== Swimming ==
Men

| Athlete | Event | Heat | | Semifinal | | Final | |
| Athlete | Event | Time | Rank | Time | Rank | Time | Rank |
|---|---|---|---|---|---|---|---|
| George Bovell | 50 m freestyle | 22.37 | 5 Q | 22.22 | 4 Q | 22.31 | 5 |
| Dylan Carter | 100 m freestyle | 49.72 | 5 Q | 49.50 | 6 Q | 49.56 | 5 |
| Dylan Carter | 200 m freestyle | 1:50.09 | 13 | —N/a | | did not advance | |
| Dylan Carter | 400 m freestyle | 3:58.41 | 18 | —N/a | | did not advance | |
| George Bovell | 50 m backstroke | 25.50 | 6 Q | 25.39 | 8 Q | Withdrew | |
| Dylan Carter | 100 m butterfly | 54.21 | 14 Q | 54.45 | 16 | did not advance | |

== Table tennis ==
- Rheann Chung
- Yuvraj Dookram
- Aleena Edwards
- Curtis Humphreys
- Ashley Quashie
- Dexter St Louis
- Catherine Spicer
- Aaron Wilson

== Triathlon ==
| Athlete | Event | Swim (1.5 km) | Bike (40 km) | Run (10 km) | Total Time | Rank |
|---|---|---|---|---|---|---|
| David Cottle | Men's | 25:07 | Lapped | | | |
