= Jameela McCarthy =

Trinidad and Tobago netball international

Personal information
- Born: 20 June 1995 (age 31)
- Height: 1.91 m (6 ft 3 in)
- University: University of Trinidad and Tobago

Netball career
- Playing positions: GA, GS, GK, GD
Years	Club team	Apps
201x–2017	UTT	
2017–2018	Fire Service	
2019–2020	Defence Force	
2021–2022	Saracens Mavericks	
Years	National team	Caps
2017–	Trinidad and Tobago	19+
Medal record
Representing Trinidad and Tobago
Central American and Caribbean Games
Silver medal – second place	2023 San Salvador	Netball

Jameela McCarthy (born 20 June 1995) is a Trinidad and Tobago netball international. She represented Trinidad and Tobago at the 2019 and 2023 Netball World Cups. In the All Sectors Netball League, McCarthy has played for the University of Trinidad and Tobago, Trinidad and Tobago Fire Service and Trinidad and Tobago Defence Force. She also played for Saracens Mavericks in the 2022 Netball Superleague. McCarthy is also a basketball player and she represented Trinidad and Tobago at the 2022 FIBA 3x3 AmeriCup.

== Playing career ==
=== All Sectors Netball League ===
McCarthy initially played for the University of Trinidad and Tobago in their All Sectors Netball League Alternative Division team. In 2015 and 2016 she was playing for the UTT Premiership team. Together with Onella Jack, Kalifa McCollin and Samantha Wallace, McCarthy was a part of the UTT contingent that played in the 2017 Netball New Zealand Super Club. In 2017 and 2018 she played for Fire Service and in 2019 and 2020 she played for Defence Force.

=== Saracens Mavericks ===
Ahead of the 2022 Netball Superleague season, McCarthy signed for Saracens Mavericks. In late 2021, she played for Mavericks in the British Fast5 Netball All-Stars Championship and a pre-season tournament. During the season itself, she played for Mavericks in their three opening matches against London Pulse, Wasps and Celtic Dragons. However her season was subsequently cut short due to "medical reasons".

=== Trinidad and Tobago ===
McCarthy made her senior debut for Trinidad and Tobago during a 2017 series against Barbados. She subsequently represented Trinidad and Tobago at the 2019 and 2023 Netball World Cups and at the 2023 Central American and Caribbean Games. She has made over 19 senior appearances for Trinidad and Tobago.

Tournaments	Place
2019 Netball World Cup	9th
2023 Netball World Cup Regional Qualifier – Americas	2nd
2023 Central American and Caribbean Games	2nd
2023 Netball World Cup	12th

== Basketball ==
McCarthy is also a basketball player. She has played in local Trinidad and Tobago competitions for various teams, including the Trinidad and Tobago Defence Force team and Straker Nets. She also represented Trinidad and Tobago at the 2022 FIBA 3x3 AmeriCup.
