= 2010 AFNA World Netball Championship qualifiers =

International netball series hosted by Saint Lucia

Tournament details
- Host country: Saint Lucia
- City: Castries
- Venue: Beausejour Indoor Facility
- Dates: 22–28 July 2010
- Teams: 6

Final positions
- Champions: Trinidad and Tobago
- Runners-up: Barbados
- Third place: United States

Tournament statistics
- Matches played: 15

The 2010 AFNA World Netball Championship qualifiers was a series organised by the Americas Federation of Netball Associations. The series served as an Americas qualifier for the 2011 World Netball Championships. It featured six teams playing a series of netball test matches in July 2012 at Castries' Beausejour Indoor Facility. The hosts, Saint Lucia, were joined by five other national netball teams. Trinidad and Tobago and Barbados eventually finished as winners and runners up and qualified for the 2011 World Netball Championships.

== Teams, head coaches and captains ==
Team	Head coach	Captain
Barbados		
Canada	Ann Willcocks ?	
Saint Lucia		
Saint Vincent and the Grenadines	Godfrey Harry	Gailene Gordon
Trinidad and Tobago	Bridget Adams	Janelle Barker
United States	Robert Whyte	

== Debutants ==
- Onella Jack, Candice Guerero, Angel Ottley, Daystar Swift and Krista Winchester made their senior debuts for Trinidad and Tobago.

== Matches ==
=== Round 1 ===
Friday, 23 July 2010	Barbados	57–33	Saint Vincent and the Grenadines
17:00	Lydia Bishop 31/39 (79%); Nikita Piggott 26/31 (84%)		Jasmine Frank 18/25 (72%); Gailene Gordon 14/19 (74%) ?? 1

Friday, 23 July 2010	Trinidad and Tobago	48–36	Canada
18:30	Janelle Barker 18/21 (86%); Anastascia Wilson 13/13 (100%); Samantha Wallace 8/16 (50%); Joelisa Cooper 7/8 (88%) ?? 2

Friday, 23 July 2010	Saint Lucia	43–45?	United States
17:00	Glatta Gabriel 19/22 (86%); Dedra Mathurin 15/17 (88%); Shem Maxwell 9/13 (69%)		Georgina Hibbert-Campbell 40/44 (91%); Roneish Darius 5/9 (56%)

=== Round 2 ===
Saturday, 24 July 2010	Trinidad and Tobago	53–43	Saint Vincent and the Grenadines
16:00			Mary Ann Fredericks 22/25 (88%); Jasmine Frank 13/18 (72%); Gailene Gordon 8/11 (73%)

Saturday, 24 July 2010	Barbados	51–40	United States
17:30	Nikita Piggott 23/29 (79%); Laurel Brown 16/23 (70%); Lydia Bishop 12/12 (100%)

Saturday, 24 July 2010	Saint Lucia	47–45	Canada
19:00	Dedra Mathurin 39/40 (98%) ?? 8

=== Round 3 ===
Sunday, 25 July 2010	United States	42–36	Canada
16:00

Sunday, 25 July 2010	Saint Lucia	46–40	Saint Vincent and the Grenadines
17:30			Gailene Gordon 21/29 (72%); Jasmine Frank 13/19 (68%); Mary Ann Fredericks 6/8 (75%)

Sunday, 25 July 2010	Trinidad and Tobago	59–49	Barbados
19:00

=== Round 4 ===
Monday, 26 July 2010	Saint Vincent and the Grenadines	53–48	Canada
17:00	Gailene Gordon 42/48 (88%)} Rose Clair Hall 10/11 (91%); Jasmine Frank 1/4 (25%)

Monday, 26 July 2010	Trinidad and Tobago	49–34	United States
18:30

Monday, 26 July 2010	Saint Lucia	53–50	Barbados
20:00	Dedra Mathurin 32/33 (97%); Shem Maxwell 21/21 (100%)		Lydia Bishop 29/35 (83%); Nikita Piggott 18/19 (95%); Nadia Blackman 3/3 (100%)

=== Round 5 ===
Tuesday, 27 July 2010	United States	63–39	Saint Vincent and the Grenadines
16:30	Georgina Hibbert-Campbell 53/57 (93%); Petra Williams 10/12 (83%)		Gailene Gordon 15/17 (88%); Tamara Samuel 9/10 (90%); Mary Ann Fredericks 9/12 (75%); Jasmine Frank 3/5 (60%); Rose Clair Hall 3/6 (50%)

Tuesday, 27 July 2010	Barbados	60–31	Canada
18:00	Lydia Bishop 34/39 (87%); Nikita Piggott 26/28 (93%)		Sabrina Vesteeg 14/23 (61%); Amanda Bongers 17/27 (63%)

Tuesday, 27 July 2010	Saint Lucia	45–58	Trinidad and Tobago
19:30	Dedra Mathurin 17/19 (89%); Melissa Alfred 15/17 (88%); Shem Maxwell 13/15 (87%)		Anastascia Wilson 49/52 (94%); Joelisa Cooper 5/7 (71%); Janelle Barker 4/5 (80%)

== Final table ==
Pos	Team	P	W	D	L	GF	GA	GD	Pts
1	Trinidad and Tobago	5	5	0	0	267	207	+60	10
2	Barbados	5	3	0	2	267	216	+51	6
3	United States	5	3	0	2	224	215	+9	6
4	Saint Lucia	5	3	0	2	231	238	-7	6
5	Saint Vincent and the Grenadines	5	1	0	4	207	267	-60	2
6	Canada	5	0	0	5	196	249	-53	0

Qualified for the 2011 World Netball Championships

== Top three squads ==
Winners	Runners Up	Third
Trinidad and Tobago; Coach: Bridget Adams	Barbados; Coach:	United States; Coach: Robert Whyte
Janelle Barker (c); Joelisa Cooper; Kielle Connelly; Candice Guerero; Rhonda John-Davis; Onella Jack; Anika La Roche; Angel Ottley; Daystar Swift; Samantha Wallace; Anastasia Wilson; Krista Winchester	Lydia Bishop; Latonia Blackman; Nadia Blackman; Laurel Browne; Sabrina Browne; Samantha Browne; Kizzy Marville; Nikita Piggott; Lisa Puckerin; Tonisha Rock-Yaw; Shakira Shepherd; Sabrina Smith	Lisa Brady; Tyiesha Bennett; Tasha Yanique Brown; Georgina Hibbert-Campbell; Natalie Cousins; Roniesh Davis; Christine Hayward; Nikeisha Jack; Dailan McArthur; Melinda Mitchell; Jessica Strout; Janay Whittaker; Petra Williams; Sandra Williams; Laura Woodroof
