= UTT Patriots (netball) =

Trinidad and Tobago netball team

- Based in: University of Trinidad and Tobago
- Head coach: Bridget Adams
- Premierships: 9 (2010, 2011, 2012, 2013, 2015, 2016, 2024, 2023, 2026)
- League: All Sectors Netball League
- Website: utt.edu.tt/patriots
Uniform
Uniform

UTT Patriots are a Trinidad and Tobago netball team that represent the University of Trinidad and Tobago. They play in the All Sectors Netball League, entering teams in the Premiership, Championship and Alternative divisions. They are one of the league's most successful teams. In 2017, they also represented Trinidad and Tobago in the Netball New Zealand Super Club. In 2020 sports teams representing the University of Trinidad and Tobago, including the netball team, became known as the UTT Patriots.

== History ==
=== All Sectors Netball League ===
UTT Patriots play in the All Sectors Netball League, entering teams in the Premiership, Championship and Alternative divisions and knockout competitions such as the Courts Open Knockout, the Steve Sarjeant Challenge Trophy and the Jean Pierre Challenge Trophy. They are one of the league's most successful teams. In 2020 sports teams representing UTT, including the netball team, became known as the UTT Patriots.

=== Netball New Zealand Super Club ===
With a team coached by Bridget Adams and featuring Onella Jack, Jameela McCarthy, Kalifa McCollin and Samantha Wallace, UTT also represented Trinidad and Tobago in the 2017 Netball New Zealand Super Club.

=== United States ===
UTT have also competed in tournaments in the United States. In 2024, UTT Patriots won USA Netball's National Premier League.

=== Seasons ===
Season	Titles won
2008	Jean Pierre, Florida Netball Classic
2009	None
2010	Championship
2011	Championship, Open Knockout, Jean Pierre
2012	Premiership
2013	Premiership, Alternative, Open Knockout
2014	Alternative
2015	Premiership, Alternative, Open Knockout, Steve Sarjeant
2016	Premiership, Open Knockout, Steve Sarjeant, Jean Pierre
2017	None
2018	Open Knockout
2019	None
2020	None
2023	None
2024	Premiership, Open Knockout, Steve Sarjeant, USA Netball's National Premier League
2025	Open Knockout, Steve Sarjeant, Jean Pierre
2026	Premiership, Alternative, Open Knockout, Steve Sarjeant, Jean Pierre

== Notable players ==
=== Captains ===
Years	Captains
2008	Crystal-Ann George
2016	Kielle Connelly

=== Internationals ===
Trinidad and Tobago

- Candice Guerero
- Onella Jack
- Jameela McCarthy
- Kalifa McCollin
- Daystar Swift
- Samantha Wallace

=== All Sectors Netball League MVPs ===
Season	Player
2008	Crystal George
2012	Candice Guerero
2013	Candice Guerero
2015	Kielle Connelly
2016	Candice Guerero
2024	Kalifa McCollin
2025	Kalifa McCollin
2026	Kalifa McCollin

== Coaches ==
=== Head coaches ===
Coach	Years
Bridget Adams	

== Honours ==
- ASNL Premiership
  - Winners: 2012, 2013, 2015, 2016, 2024, 2023, 2026
- ASNL Championship
  - Winners: 2010, 2011
- Alternative Division
  - Winners: 2013, 2014, 2015, 2026
- Open Knockout
  - Winners: 2011, 2013, 2015, 2016, 2018, 2024, 2025, 2026
- Steve Sarjeant Challenge Trophy
  - Winners: 2015, 2016, 2024, 2025, 2026
- Jean Pierre Challenge Trophy
  - Winners: 2008, 2011, 2016, 2025, 2026
