= Daystar Swift =

Trinidad and Tobago netball international

Personal information
- Born: 7 December 1991 (age 34)
- Height: 1.91 m (6 ft 3 in)
- Relative: Victoria Swift (sister)
- University: University of Trinidad and Tobago

Netball career
- Playing positions: GD, GK, GS
Years	Club team	Apps
2009–2013	UTT	
2014	Game Changers	
2015–2016	UTT	
2018	UWI	
2019	Fire Service	
2020	Northern Stars	
2023–	UTT Patriots	
Years	National team	Caps
2010–	Trinidad and Tobago	61
Medal record
Representing Trinidad and Tobago
Central American and Caribbean Games
Silver medal – second place	2023 San Salvador	Netball

Daystar Swift (born 7 December 1991) is a Trinidad and Tobago netball international. She represented Trinidad and Tobago at the 2014 Commonwealth Games. She has also represented Trinidad and Tobago at the 2015, 2019 and 2023 Netball World Cups. In the All Sectors Netball League, Swift has played for UTT Patriots, the Game Changers, the University of the West Indies and Fire Service. During the 2020 ANZ Premiership season, she played for Northern Stars.

== Family and employment ==
Swift is a high school PE teacher. She is the mother of a daughter (born c.2018). Her younger sister, Victoria Swift, is a Trinidad and Tobago women's football international.

== Playing career ==
=== All Sectors Netball League ===
In the All Sectors Netball League, Swift played for the University of Trinidad and Tobago, the Game Changers, the University of the West Indies and Fire Service. In 2013, playing as a goal shooter, Swift was a prominent member of the UTT team that won the Premiership and Open Knockout. In 2014, Swift played for Game Changers. Her team mates included Candice Guerero and Kalifa McCollin. In 2015 and 2016, she was also a prominent member of the UTT teams that won the Premiership, Open Knockout and Steve Sarjeant Trophy titles two seasons in succession. In 2018, Swift played for UWI. In 2019 was a member of the Fire Service team that won the Premiership and Steve Sarjeant Trophy.

=== Northern Stars ===
Ahead of the 2020 ANZ Premiership season, Swift signed for Northern Stars. On 15 March 2020, Swift made her ANZ Premiership debut for Northern Stars against Northern Mystics during the opening round of the 2020 season. However, shortly after her debut, the season was suspended due to the COVID-19 pandemic. During the break, Swift suffered a meniscus tear that sidelined her for most of the season. On 30 July, she made her comeback during the Round 8 match against Mainland Tactix. Swift was not included in the Stars squad for the 2021 ANZ Premiership season. She subsequently returned to Trinidad and Tobago via Barbados, where herself and fellow Trinidad and Tobago international, Kalifa McCollin, had to stay while waiting for permission to return home.

=== UTT Patriots ===
Since 2023, Swift has played for UTT Patriots in the All Sectors Netball League.

=== Trinidad and Tobago ===
Swift made her senior debut for Trinidad and Tobago at the 2010 AFNA World Netball Championship qualifiers. She subsequently represented Trinidad and Tobago at the 2014 Commonwealth Games. She has also represented Trinidad and Tobago at the 2015, 2019 and 2023 Netball World Cups. She captained Trinidad and Tobago at the 2016 World University Netball Championship and 2023 Central American and Caribbean Games. She has made over 60 senior appearances for Trinidad and Tobago.

Tournaments	Place
2010 AFNA World Netball Championship qualifiers	1st
2014 Commonwealth Games	10th
2015 Netball Europe Open Championships	5th
2015 Netball World Cup	9th
2016 World University Netball Championship	6th
2018 AFNA Championships	1st
2019 Netball World Cup	9th
2023 Central American and Caribbean Games	2nd
2023 Netball World Cup	12th

== Honours ==
Trinidad and Tobago

- AFNA Championships
  - Winners: 2014, 2018?
- Netball World Cup Qualifiers
  - Winners: 2010, 2014, 2018?
- Central American and Caribbean Games
  - Runners Up: 2023
