= 2017 Netball New Zealand Super Club =

Netball tournament

- League: Netball New Zealand Super Club
- Sport: Netball
- Duration: 2 July – 7 July 2017
- Teams: 8
- TV partner: Sky Sport (New Zealand)
- Winners: Southern Steel
- Runners-up: Central Pulse

Netball New Zealand Super Club seasons
- 2018 →

The 2017 Netball New Zealand Super Club was the inaugural Netball New Zealand Super Club tournament. With a team coached by Reinga Bloxham, captained by Wendy Frew and featuring Gina Crampton, Jhaniele Fowler-Reid, Shannon Francois, and Jane Watson, Southern Steel finished the tournament as inaugural winners. Steel went through the tournament unbeaten, defeating Northern Mystics 79–58 in the final. All the matches were hosted at the Trafalgar Centre in Nelson between 2 July and 7 July 2007. All the matches were broadcast live on Sky Sport (New Zealand).

== Teams ==
The tournament featured eight teams. These included the top three from the 2017 ANZ Premiership season – Southern Steel, Central Pulse and Northern Mystics.

Team	League	Head coach	Captain
(Wales) Celtic Flames	^{(Note 1)}	Trish Wilcox	Suzy Drane
(New Zealand) Central Pulse	ANZ Premiership	Yvette McCausland-Durie	Cathrine Tuivaiti
(South Africa) Gauteng Jaguars	Brutal Fruit Netball Cup	Jenny van Dyk	Shadine van der Merwe
(Fiji) Marama Vou	^{(Note 2)}	Unaisi Rokoura	Vaiti Waqatabu
(Australia) New South Wales Institute of Sport	^{(Note 3)}	Briony Akle	
(New Zealand) Northern Mystics	ANZ Premiership	Helene Wilson	Anna Harrison
(New Zealand) Southern Steel	ANZ Premiership	Reinga Bloxham	Wendy Frew
University of Trinidad and Tobago	All Sectors Netball League	Bridget Adams	

Notes

^1 Celtic Flames were effectively the Wales national netball team plus guests. Wales play as Celtic Dragons in the Netball Superleague. The Celtic Flames squad featured past and present Dragons players, including Chelsea Lewis and Nia Jones. They also included two New Zealand internationals as guest players, Anna Thompson and Temalisi Fakahokotau of Mainland Tactix.

^2 Marama Vou were a Netball Fiji representative team featuring mainly Fiji under-19 players. The team also included Brooke Leaver and Erikana Pedersen of Mainland Tactix as guest players.

^3 The New South Wales Institute of Sport team was effectively a combined New South Wales Swifts and Giants Netball team. Its head coach was Briony Akle while Julie Fitzgerald was an assistant coach.

== Group A ==
=== Matches ===
Day 1

2 July 2017	NSWIS	74–46	UTT
	Kristina Brice 33/39 (85%); Sophie Garbin 18/23 (78%); Angela Frketic 10/11 (91%)	Report; Stats	Samantha Wallace 26/30 (87%); Kalifa McCollin 20/23 (87%)

2 July 2017	Southern Steel	81–37	Gauteng Jaguars
	Jhaniele Fowler-Reid 58/64 (91%); Jamie Hume 13/18 (72%); Olivia Bates 6/7 (86%); Jennifer O'Connell 4/8 (50%)	Stats	Ine-Marí Venter 21/31 (68%); Renske Stoltz 13/18 (72%); Chante Louw 4/5 (80%); Anique Grobler 1/2 (50%)

Day 2

3 July 2017	NSWIS	74–45	Gauteng Jaguars
3:00pm	Kristina Brice 51/57 (89%); Sophie Garbin 10/14 (71%); Angela Frketic 4/5 (80%)	Report; Stats	Ine-Marí Venter 26/36 (72%); Renske Stoltz 18/29 (62%); Chante Louw 1/2 (50%)

3 July 2017	Southern Steel	86–55	UTT
6:40pm	Jhaniele Fowler-Reid 59/64 (92%); Jamie Hume 9/14 (64%); Jennifer O'Connell 11/15 (73%); Olivia Bates 7/16 (44%)	Stats	Samantha Wallace 35/38 (92%); Kalifa McCollin 20/25 (80%)

Day 3

5 July 2017	Southern Steel	77–61	NSWIS
	Jhaniele Fowler-Reid 68/72 (94%); Te Paea Selby-Rickit 4/5 (80%); Jamie Hume 3/7 (43%); Olivia Bates 2/2 (100%)	Report	Kristina Brice 41/47 (87%); Sophie Garbin 15/18 (83%); Georgia Marshall 5/6 (83%)

5 July 2017	Gauteng Jaguars	63–63	UTT
	Ine-Marí Venter 45/64 (70%); Renske Stoltz 18/26 (69%)	Stats	Samantha Wallace 41/43 (95%); Kalifa McCollin 22/23 (96%)

=== Final ladder ===
Group A
Pos	Team	P	W	D	L	GF	GA	Pts
1	(New Zealand) Southern Steel	3	3	0	0	244	153	6
2	(Australia) NSWIS	3	2	0	1	209	168	4
3	(Trinidad and Tobago) UTT	3	0	1	2	164	223	1
4	(South Africa) Gauteng Jaguars	3	0	1	2	145	218	1

Qualified for Semi-finals
5th/8th place classification

== Group B ==
=== Matches ===
Day 1

2 July 2017	Northern Mystics	92–43	Marama Vou
	Tera-Maria Amani 62/67 (93%); Paula Griffin 19/21 (90%); Maria Tutaia 11/11 (100%)	Stats	Afa Rusivakula 32/40 (80%); Maria Lutua 7/16 (44%); Kelera Nawai 4/4 (100%)

2 July 2017	Central Pulse	65–41	Celtic Flames
	Te Amo Amaru-Tibble 25/28 (89%); Cathrine Tuivaiti 24/29 (83%); Jermaine Howard-Vallance 15/18 (83%); Eseta Autagavaia 1/2 (50%)	Report; Stats	Chelsea Lewis 18/27 (67%); Anna Thompson 12/18 (67%); Georgia Rowe 11/11 (100%)

Day 2

3 July 2017	Celtic Flames	68–41	Marama Vou
4:50pm	Chelsea Lewis 38/48 (79%); Anna Thompson 12/20 (60%); Georgia Rowe 13/14 (93%); Eleanor Roberts 5/6 (83%)	Stats	Brooke Leaver 22/27 (81%); Maria Lutua 11/18 (61%); Afa Rusivakula 8/11 (73%)

3 July 2017	Northern Mystics	59–54	Central Pulse
8:30pm	Bailey Mes 31/34 (91%); Maria Tutaia 28/33 (85%)	Stats	Cathrine Tuivaiti 32/34 (94%); Te Amo Amaru-Tibble 22/24 (92%)

Day 3

5 July 2017	Central Pulse	67–50	Marama Vou
	Cathrine Tuivaiti 36/38 (95%); Te Amo Amaru-Tibble 18/20 (90%); Jermaine Howard-Vallance 7/10 (70%); Eseta Autagavaia 6/9 (67%)	Stats	Afa Rusivakula 38/44 (86%); Brooke Leaver 11/12 (92%); Maria Lutua 1/2 (50%)

5 July 2017	Northern Mystics	66–43	Celtic Flames
	Tera-Maria Amani 44/48 (92%); Paula Griffin 13/15 (87%); Maria Tutaia 9/24 (38%)	Report; Stats	Chelsea Lewis 25/32 (78%); Georgia Rowe 10/11 (91%); Anna Thompson 7/10 (70%); Eleanor Roberts 1/1 (100%)

=== Final ladder ===
Group B
Pos	Team	P	W	D	L	GF	GA	Pts
1	(New Zealand) Northern Mystics	3	3	0	0	217	140	6
2	(New Zealand) Central Pulse	3	2	0	1	186	150	4
3	(Wales) Celtic Flames	3	1	0	2	152	172	2
4	(Fiji) Marama Vou	3	0	0	3	134	227	0

Qualified for Semi-finals
5th/8th place classification

== 5th/8th place classification ==
=== Semi-finals ===
6 July 2017	Celtic Flames	57–45	Gauteng Jaguars
3:00pm	Chelsea Lewis 35/44 (80%); Anna Thompson 12/17 (71%); Georgia Rowe 10/11 (91%)	Stats	Ine-Marí Venter 33/37 (89%); Renske Stoltz 12/15 (80%)

6 July 2017	UTT	57–56	Marama Vou
4:50pm	Samantha Wallace 39/46 (85%); Kalifa McCollin 18/21 (86%)	Stats	Brooke Leaver 27/33 (82%); Maria Lutua 15/25 (60%); Afa Rusivakula 14/17 (82%)

=== 7th/8th place match ===
7 July 2017	Gauteng Jaguars	68–49	Marama Vou
	Ine-Marí Venter 45/59 (76%); Renske Stoltz 23/31 (74%)	Stats	Afa Rusivakula 31/36 (86%); Brooke Leaver 10/11 (91%); Maria Lutua 8/10 (80%)

=== 5th/6th place match ===
Celtic Flames finished in fifth place, ahead of all other invited international teams outside Australia and New Zealand.

7 July 2017	Celtic Flames	62–47	UTT
	Georgia Rowe 29/32 (91%); Chelsea Lewis 16/18 (89%); Anna Thompson 16/19 (84%); Eleanor Roberts 1/2 (50%)	Report; Stats	Samantha Wallace 32/37 (86%); Kalifa McCollin 15/17 (88%)

== 1st/4th Play offs ==
=== Semi-finals ===
6 July 2017	Southern Steel	70–54	Central Pulse
6:40pm	Jhaniele Fowler-Reid 55/59 (93%); Te Paea Selby-Rickit 12/15 (80%); Olivia Bates 3/7 (43%); Jamie Hume 0/1 (0%)	Stats	Cathrine Tuivaiti 30/30 (100%); Te Amo Amaru-Tibble 24/29 (83%)

6 July 2017	Northern Mystics	66–48	NSWIS
8:30pm	Bailey Mes 45/49 (92%); Maria Tutaia 21/29 (72%)	Report; Stats	Kristina Brice 34/39 (87%); Sophie Garbin 7/9 (78%); Georgia Marshall 6/8 (75%); Angela Frketic 1/2 (50%)

=== Third place play-off ===
7 July 2017	Stats	NSWIS	48–46	Central Pulse	Sky Sport
7 July 2017	Stats	Scoring by quarter: 15–12, 21–29, 34–39, 48–46			Sky Sport
7 July 2017	Stats	Kristina Brice 30/39 (77%); Sophie Garbin 13/18 (72%); Georgia Marshall 5/8 (63%)		Te Amo Amaru-Tibble 29/33 (88%); Jermaine Howard-Vallance 12/19 (63%); Eseta Autagavaia 3/5 (60%); Cathrine Tuivaiti 2/2 (100%)	Sky Sport

=== Final ===
7 July 2017	Stats	Southern Steel	79–58	Northern Mystics	Sky Sport
7 July 2017	Stats	Scoring by quarter: 17–17, 32–34, 53–46, 79–58			Sky Sport
7 July 2017	Stats	Jhaniele Fowler-Reid 65/70 (93%); Te Paea Selby-Rickit 12/18 (67%); Olivia Bates 2/3 (67%)		Bailey Mes 32/33 (97%); Maria Tutaia 20/27 (74%); Tera-Maria Amani 6/8 (75%)	Sky Sport

== Final standings ==
Rank	Team
1st place, gold medalist(s)	(New Zealand) Southern Steel
2nd place, silver medalist(s)	(New Zealand) Northern Mystics
3rd place, bronze medalist(s)	(Australia) NSWIS
4th	(New Zealand) Central Pulse
5th	(Wales) Celtic Flames
6th	(Trinidad and Tobago) UTT
7th	(South Africa) Gauteng Jaguars
8th	(Fiji) Marama Vou
