= UTT Patriots =

UTT Patriots may refer to:

- UT Tyler Patriots, athletic teams that represent the University of Texas at Tyler.
- UTT Patriots (netball) and other sports teams representing the University of Trinidad and Tobago.
