= Khazia Hislop =

Trinidadian artistic gymnast (born 1998)

- Born: June 30, 1998 (age 28) London, United Kingdom

Gymnastics career
- Discipline: Women's artistic gymnastics
- Country represented: Trinidad and Tobago
- College team: University of North Carolina
- Club: Brestyan
- Last updated on: August 1, 2014.

Khazia Shani Hislop (born June 30, 1998) is a British-born artistic gymnast who lives in the United States and was a member of the national team of Trinidad and Tobago. She was selected for the 2014 Commonwealth Games but withdrew to injury. From 2016 to 2020, she also competed in NCAA collegiate gymnastics.

== Early life and education ==
Hislop was born in London, England. Her father is Trinidadian association football player and commentator Shaka Hislop. She attended the University of North Carolina beginning in 2016, where she majored in sports administration and communications.

== Career ==
Hislop began training in gymnastics at age 6. She competed at level 10 (the highest developmental level) in the USA Gymnastics program, and in 2014 she also began competing as an elite gymnast for Trinidad and Tobago; she was inspired by two of her teammates who did so for other countries. She trained at Brestyan's Gymnastics under Mihai Brestyan alongside teammates such as Talia Chiarelli and Aly Raisman.

In 2014, Hislop was selected to compete at the Commonwealth Games in July, which was to be her first major competition representing Trinidad; however, she withdrew due to an overuse injury. She then broke her elbow in August after another gymnast landed on her arm and missed competing at the Pan American Championships held later that month.

In 2016, she began competing in collegiate gymnastics at the University of North Carolina. During her first year, she competed in every meet on balance beam and floor; in her second and third years, she also competed vault in every meet.
