= Rhonda John-Davis =

Trinidad and Tobago netball and basketball international

Personal information
- Full name: Rhonda Shervonne John-Davis
- Born: 28 November 1978 (age 47) Port of Spain, Trinidad and Tobago
- Height: 1.76 m (5 ft 9 in)
- University: Lincoln University; University of Trinidad and Tobago

Netball career
- Playing positions: GA, WA, C
Years	Club team	Apps
19xx–19xx	Recreation United	
199x–199x	Marvelites	
199x–2009	Defence Force	
2010–2017	Police Service	
2018–2019	Police Youth Club	
Years	National team	Caps
1999–2019	Trinidad and Tobago	150+
Coaching career
- Years: Team
- 2016–2017: Trinidad and Tobago U21

Rhonda Shervonne John-Davis (born 28 November 1978) is a former Trinidad and Tobago netball international. Between 1999 and 2019 she represented Trinidad and Tobago at six Netball World Cups. She captained Trinidad and Tobago at the 2007 and 2019 tournaments. In 2019 she became the first netball player to play at six Netball World Cups. She also represented Trinidad and Tobago at the 2010 and 2014 Commonwealth Games. She also played for the Trinidad and Tobago women's national basketball team.

== Early years, education and employment ==
John-Davis was born in Port of Spain. Her home town is Sangre Grande. She attended Lincoln University in Missouri and graduated with a bachelor's degree in health and wellness. She later studied a masters degree in sports management at the University of Trinidad and Tobago. John-Davis served as a police officer with the Trinidad and Tobago Police Service. In 2017 she was a WPC attached to the Homicide Bureau of Investigation.

== Netball ==
=== Playing career ===
==== Early years ====
John-Davis started playing netball, aged 9, while still attending primary school in Sangre Grande. She later graduated to club level, playing with Recreation United in the Mayaro Netball League. She also played in the Arima Netball League and for Marvelites in the Port of Spain Netball League.

==== All Sectors Netball League ====
In the All Sectors Netball League, John-Davis played for the Trinidad and Tobago Defence Force, the Trinidad and Tobago Police Service and Police Youth Club teams. In 2009, while playing for the Defence Force she was the ASNL MVP. In 2010, after switching to the Police Service, she was again named MVP. She continued playing for the Police Service until 2017. In 2017, she was named MVP for a third time. In 2018 and 2019, she played for the Police Youth Club.

==== Trinidad and Tobago ====
John-Davis made over 150 senior appearances for Trinidad and Tobago. She made her senior debut, aged 21, at the 1999 World Netball Championships. Between 1999 and 2019 she represented Trinidad and Tobago at six Netball World Cups. She captained Trinidad and Tobago at the 2007 and 2019 tournaments. In 2019, aged 40, she became the first netball player to play at six Netball World Cups. Together with Latonia Blackman, Jade Clarke and Geva Mentor, she is one of only four players to feature in six Netball World Cups. She also represented Trinidad and Tobago at the 2010 and 2014 Commonwealth Games

Tournaments	Place
1999 World Netball Championships	8th
2003 World Netball Championships	10th
2006 AFNA Championships	1st
2007 Netball Singapore Nations Cup	2nd
2007 World Netball Championships	11th
2008 AFNA Championships	2nd
2010 AFNA World Netball Championship qualifiers	1st
2010 Commonwealth Games	8th
2011 World Netball Championships	7th
2012 AFNA Championships	3rd
2014 Commonwealth Games	10th
2015 Netball Europe Open Championships	5th
2015 Netball World Cup	9th
2018 AFNA Championships	1st
2019 Netball World Cup	9th

=== Coaching career ===
In August 2016, John-Davis served as head coach of the Trinidad and Tobago U21s as they qualified for the 2017 Netball World Youth Cup. She also served as head coach at the tournament itself.

== Basketball ==
John-Davis also played for the Trinidad and Tobago women's national basketball team, most notably at the 2010 Centrobasket Women tournament and at the 2014 CBC Championships for Women. While attending Lincoln University in Missouri, she played basketball for Lincoln Blue Tigers. In Trinidad and Tobago, like in netball, she played for the Trinidad and Tobago Defence Force and the Trinidad and Tobago Police Service teams. In January 2021, John-Davis was mistakenly listed as being a member of the 2021–22 North Carolina Tar Heels men's basketball team. The squad featured a similarly named player, R. J. Davis.

== Honours ==
Trinidad and Tobago

- AFNA Championships
  - Winners: 2006, 2014?, 2018
  - Runners Up: 2008
- Netball World Cup Qualifiers
  - Winners: 2006, 2010, 2014?, 2018
- Netball Singapore Nations Cup
  - Runners Up: 2007

Individual Awards

Year	Award
2009	ASNL MVP
2010	ASNL MVP
2017	ASNL MVP
