= 1990 in Trinidad and Tobago =

- Decades: 1970s; 1980s; 1990s; 2000s; 2010s
- See also: Other events of 1990; Timeline of Trinidadian and Tobagonian history

Events in the year 1990 in Trinidad and Tobago.

== Incumbents ==
- President: Noor Hassanali
- Prime Minister: A. N. R. Robinson
- Chief Justice: Clinton Bernard

== Events ==
- 27 July – 1 August – Jamaat al Muslimeen coup attempt

== Deaths ==
- 1 August – Leo Des Vignes, Member of Parliament for Diego Martin Central.
