= Bermudez Biscuit Company =

Bermudez Biscuit Company Limited,
- Industry: Food
- Headquarters: Mt. Lambert, Port of Spain, Trinidad and Tobago
- Products: Biscuits

The Bermudez Biscuit Company Ltd. is a Trinidadian company located in Mount Lambert Trinidad and Tobago. Founded by Venezuelan brothers Jose Rafael and Jose Angel Bermudez, who migrated from Venezuela to the nearby Port of Spain. Jose Rafael fascinated by technology travelled to Paris for the 1900 World Fair, where he stumbled upon an innovative wood burning biscuit oven. He returned to Trinidad with the contraption and set about with his brother to produce "salt biscuits". The products are the famous round white, wholewheat, multigrain Crix including the Crix biscuit-tins and Dixee crackers, Domino chocolate, vanilla, strawberry sweet biscuits and others. Crix crackers (biscuits in local parlance) are fondly called the "vital supplies" after a successful marketing campaign. The company has been in operation for more than 30 years.

Bermudez is a "key food processor" in the Eastern Caribbean according to the United States Department of Agriculture The company also operates in Barbados, chiefly as WIBISCO and also in Jamaica.

Bermudez is in a business family of Holiday Snacks, Kiss and a few others.
