= Onella Jack =

Trinidadian netball player (born 1991)

Personal information
- Born: 25 October 1991 (age 34)
- Occupation: netball player
- Height: 1.75 m (5 ft 9 in)

Netball career
- Playing positions: goal attack, wing attack, wing defense, goal defense
Years	National team	Caps
- Trinidad and Tobago

Onella Jack (born 25 October 1991) is a Trinidadian netball player who plays for Trinidad and Tobago in the positions of goal attack, wing attack, wing defense or goal defense. She has featured for the national side in three World Cup tournaments in 2011, 2015 and in 2019. She has also represented Trinidad and Tobago at the 2014 Commonwealth Games.
