= Candice Guerero =

Trinidadian netball player (born 1990)

Personal information
- Born: 15 April 1990 (age 36) San Fernando, Trinidad and Tobago
- Occupation: netball player
- Height: 1.78 m (5 ft 10 in)

Netball career
- Playing positions: center, wing defense
Years	National team	Caps
- Trinidad and Tobago

Candice Guerero (born 15 April 1990) is a Trinidadian netball player who plays for Trinidad and Tobago in the positions of center or wing defense. She has featured for the national side in three World Cup tournaments in 2011, 2015 and in 2019. She has also represented Trinidad and Tobago at the 2014 Commonwealth Games. She has been playing in international netball since making her debut in 2009.
