= Trinidad and Tobago national netball team =

National netball team

Trinidad and Tobago
- Nickname(s): Calypso Girls
- Association: Trinidad and Tobago Netball Association
- Confederation: Americas Netball
- Head coach: Liselle Johnson
- Captain: Shaquanda Green-Noel; Afeisha Noel
- Most caps: Rhonda John-Davis (151+)
- World ranking: 11th
Team colours

Netball World Cup
- Appearances: 15 (Debuted in 1963)
- 2023 placing: 12th
- Best result: Joint 1st (1979)

Commonwealth Games
- Appearances: 3 (Debuted in 2010)
- 2022 placing: 11th
- Best result: 8th (2010)

The Trinidad and Tobago national netball team, also known as the Calypso Girls, represent the Trinidad and Tobago Netball Association in international netball tournaments such as the Netball World Cup and Netball at the Commonwealth Games. Trinidad and Tobago are the only team other than Australia and New Zealand to have won a Netball World Cup. At the 1979 World Netball Championships they shared the gold medal with Australia and New Zealand. At the 1987 World Netball Championships they shared the silver medal with New Zealand. They were bronze medallists at the 1983 World Netball Championships. As of 1 December 2025, Trinidad and Tobago are ranked 11th in the World Netball Rankings.

== Tournament history ==
=== Major tournaments ===
==== Netball World Cup ====
Trinidad and Tobago played in the inaugural 1963 World Netball Championships. Led by coach and pioneer Lystra Lewis, the team finished fourth. With the exception of the 1991 tournament, they have competed in every World Netball Championships and/or Netball World Cup since. Trinidad and Tobago are the only team other than Australia and New Zealand to have won a Netball World Cup. Trinidad and Tobago hosted the 1979 World Netball Championships in Port of Spain. With a team coached by Lystra Lewis, captained by Sherril Peters and featuring Jean Pierre, Trinidad and Tobago won eight of their nine matches in the round-robin stage. This included a 40–38 win over Australia. However, both Australia and New Zealand also won eight of their nine matches. There were no playoffs to determine an outright winner and the tournament organisers declared all three teams champions. The Trinidad and Tobago Netball Association was subsequently awarded the Hummingbird Medal and the individual members of the team were also awarded the Chaconia Medal. Trinidad and Tobago were bronze medallists at the 1983 World Netball Championships and shared the silver medal at the 1987 World Netball Championships. Trinidad and Tobago missed the 1991 tournament after they were suspended by the International Federation of Netball Associations after their late withdrawal from the 1989 World Games. As a result, they missed the 1990 Caribbean Netball Championship which served as a qualifier the 1991 tournament.

Tournaments	Place
1963 World Netball Championships	4th
1967 World Netball Championships	6th
1971 World Netball Championships	4th
1975 World Netball Championships	4th
1979 World Netball Championships	1st place, gold medalist(s)
1983 World Netball Championships	3rd place, bronze medalist(s)
1987 World Netball Championships	2nd place, silver medalist(s)
1995 World Netball Championships	6th
1999 World Netball Championships	8th
2003 World Netball Championships	10th
2007 World Netball Championships	11th
2011 World Netball Championships	7th
2015 Netball World Cup	9th
2019 Netball World Cup	9th
2023 Netball World Cup	12th

==== Commonwealth Games ====
In 2010, Trinidad and Tobago made their debut in the Netball at the Commonwealth Games. They finished 8th and this remains their highest finish in the tournament.

Tournaments	Place
2010 Commonwealth Games	8th
2014 Commonwealth Games	10th
2022 Commonwealth Games	11th
2026 Commonwealth Games	12th

=== Americas tournaments ===
==== West Indies, Caribbean, AFNA Championships ====
In 1952, Lystra Lewis, the pioneering netball coach and administrator, first coached the Trinidad and Tobago national netball team. Competitive netball among Caribbean and West Indies countries started in 1954 with a triangular tournament featuring Trinidad and Tobago, Saint Vincent and the Grenadines and Grenada. In 1954, Lewis was instrumental in establishing the West Indies Netball Board in an effort to formalise these early netball tournaments. These tournaments subsequently evolved into the West Indies Netball Championship, the Caribbean Netball Championship and eventually the AFNA Championships. Between 1977 and 1993, Trinidad and Tobago dominated these tournaments, winning eleven titles.

Tournaments	Place
1954 West Indies Netball Championship	
1971 West Indies Netball Championship	1st
1972 West Indies Netball Championship	1st
1973 West Indies Netball Championship	2nd
1974 West Indies Netball Championship	1st
1975 West Indies Netball Championship	1st
1977 Caribbean Netball Championships	1st
1978 Caribbean Netball Championships	
1980 Caribbean Netball Championships	1st
1981 Caribbean Netball Championships	1st
1982 Caribbean Netball Championships	1st
1983 Caribbean Netball Championships	1st
1984 Caribbean Netball Championships	1st
1985 Caribbean Netball Championships	1st
1986 Caribbean Netball Championships	1st
1988 Caribbean Netball Championships	1st
1989 Caribbean Netball Championships	
1990 Caribbean Netball Championships	
1991 Caribbean Netball Championships	
1992 Caribbean Netball Championships	1st ^{1}
1993 Caribbean Netball Championships	1st ^{1}
1994 AFNA Championships	
1996 AFNA Championships	
1997 AFNA Championships	4th
2000 AFNA Championships	
2001 AFNA Championships	
2004 AFNA Championships	3rd
2005 AFNA Championships	2nd ^{2}
2006 AFNA Championships	1st ^{3}
2008 AFNA Championships	2nd
2012 AFNA Championships	3rd
2014 AFNA Championships	1st ^{4}
2018 AFNA Championships	1st ^{5}

==== Netball World Cup Qualifiers ====
Tournaments	Place
2006 AFNA Championships	1st ^{3}
2010 AFNA World Netball Championship qualifiers	1st
2014 AFNA Championships	1st ^{4}
2018 AFNA Championships	1st ^{5}
2023 Netball World Cup Regional Qualifier – Americas	2nd

Notes

- ^1 In both 1992 and 1993, Trinidad and Tobago, Barbados and Saint Vincent and the Grenadines finished as joint winners.
- ^2 The 2005 AFNA Championships also counted as a 2006 Commonwealth Games qualifier.
- ^3 The 2006 AFNA Championships also counted as a 2007 World Netball Championships Qualifier.
- ^4 The 2014 AFNA Championships also counted as a 2015 Netball World Cup Qualifier.
- ^5 The 2018 AFNA Championships also counted as a 2019 Netball World Cup Qualifier.

==== Central American and Caribbean Games ====
Tournaments	Place
2023 Central American and Caribbean Games	2nd
2026 Central American and Caribbean Games	1st

=== Invitational tournaments ===
Tournaments	Place
2007 Netball Singapore Nations Cup	2nd
2015 Netball Europe Open Championships	5th

== Players ==
=== Recent squad ===
2023 Netball World Cup – Trinidad and Tobago roster
Players
Coaches

Name	Pos	DOB	Height	Club	Nat	Caps
Alena Brooks	C, WD, WA	14 November 1991 (aged 31)	1.65 m (5 ft 5 in)			11
Tia Bruno	C, WD, WA		1.68 m (5 ft 6 in)	Police	(Trinidad and Tobago)	16
Joelisa Cooper	GS, GA	21 February 1989 (aged 34)	1.80 m (5 ft 11 in)	Fire Service	(Trinidad and Tobago)	104
Tiana Dillon	GS, GA		1.80 m (5 ft 11 in)			15
Oprah Douglas	C, WD, WA		1.66 m (5 ft 5 in)	UTT Patriots	(Trinidad and Tobago)	14
Shaquanda Greene-Noel (cc)	WD, GK, GD	24 November 1993 (aged 29)	1.85 m (6 ft 1 in)	Celtic Dragons	(Wales)	45
Jameela McCarthy	WD, GK, GD	20 June 1995 (aged 28)	1.84 m (6 ft 0 in)			19
Jeresia McEchrane	WD, GK, GD		1.78 m (5 ft 10 in)	Trinidad and Tobago Regiment	(Trinidad and Tobago)	27
Shaniya Morgan	GS, GK		1.88 m (6 ft 2 in)	UTT Patriots	(Trinidad and Tobago)	9
Afeisha Noel (cc)	GS, GA	18 November 1985 (aged 37)	1.91 m (6 ft 3 in)			53
Shantel Seemungal	C, WA		1.65 m (5 ft 5 in)	Police Youth Club	(Trinidad and Tobago)	41
Daystar Swift	GD, GK	7 December 1991 (aged 31)	1.91 m (6 ft 3 in)	UTT Patriots	(Trinidad and Tobago)	61

Head coach

- Joel Young-Strong

Notes

- (c) – Captain
- (cc) – Co-captain
- (vc) – Vice-captain
- – Injury / maternity leave
- (TRP) – Temporary Replacement Player

=== Captains ===
Captains	Years
Phyllis Walker	1963
Enid Browne	1967–1971
Jean Pierre	1975
Sherril Peters	1979, 1983
Jennifer Frank ?	1987
Bridget Adams	1988–1993
Lystra Soloman	2003
Rhonda John-Davis	2007, 2019
Janelle Barker	2010–2011
Anika La Roche-Brice	2012–2014
Joelisa Cooper	2015
Candice Guerero	2015
Samantha Wallace	2021
Kalifa McCollin	2021
Shaquanda Green-Noel	2022–2023
Afeisha Noel	2023
Daystar Swift	2023

=== 1979 Gold medallists ===
The following players were members of the Trinidad and Tobago team that were gold medallists at the 1979 World Netball Championships. Individual members of the team were also awarded the Chaconia Medal.

- Ingrid Blackman
- Angela Burke-Brown
- Peggy Castanada
- Heather Charleau
- Cyrenia Charles
- Marcia Dimsoy
- Jennifer Nurse
- Sherril Peters
- Jean Pierre
- Veryl Prescod
- Althea Thomas-Luces
- Jennifer Williams

== Head coaches ==
Coach	Years
Lystra Lewis	1952–1979
Enid Browne	1983–1987
Eunice Pena	1995
Grace Parkinson-Griffith	1999–2003
Veronica McDonald	2003
Grace Parkinson-Griffith	2006–2007
Bridget Adams	2010
Karen Worland	2010–2011
Jennifer Frank	2012
Wesley Gomes	2013–2019
Althea McCollin	2021
Kemba Duncan	2022
Joel Young-Strong	2022–2023
Liselle Johnson	2026–

== Honours ==
- World Netball Championships
  - Winners: 1979
  - Runners Up: 1987
- West Indies, Caribbean, AFNA Championships
  - Winners: 1971, 1972, 1974, 1975, 1977, 1980, 1981, 1982, 1983, 1984, 1985, 1986, 1988, 1992, 1993, 2006, 2014, 2018
  - Runners Up: 1973, 2005, 2008
- Netball World Cup Qualifiers
  - Winners: 2006, 2010, 2014, 2018
  - Runners Up: 2023
- Central American and Caribbean Games
  - Winners: 2026
  - Runners Up: 2023
- Netball Singapore Nations Cup
  - Runners Up: 2007
