= 2019 Netball World Cup =

International netball tournament

- Official logo

Tournament details
- Host country: England
- Venue: Liverpool Arena
- Dates: 12–21 July 2019
- Teams: 16

Final positions
- Champions: New Zealand (5th title)
- Runners-up: Australia
- Third place: England

Tournament statistics
- Matches played: 60
- Top scorer(s): (Sri Lanka) Tharjini Sivalingam (348 goals)
- All statistics correct as of 17 July 2019.

The 2019 Netball World Cup (also known as the 2019 Vitality Netball World Cup for sponsorship reasons) was the 15th edition of the INF Netball World Cup. It was held from 12–21 July 2019 at the Liverpool Arena in Liverpool, England with matches being held on two courts. Host nation England finished their campaign with a bronze medal. New Zealand became 5th time champions after beating Australia in the final and gold medal match.

Sixteen nations contested for the title, which included the top six of the previous tournament which was held in Sydney, Australia. After two group stage rounds, Australia, England, New Zealand and South Africa all made it to the semi-finals. In a rematch of the 2015 final, New Zealand would take home their fifth title after defeating Australia by one goal. England finished in third place, after defeating South Africa.

Trinidad and Tobago's Rhonda John-Davis appeared in her sixth World Cup, a World Cup record.

== Organisation ==
Liverpool Arena
Host venue
Location	Liverpool, England
Constructed	2008
Capacity	11,000

The 2019 Netball World Cup was launched in January 2018 at St George's Hall in Liverpool, the host city. Liverpool was selected as the host city for the event in February 2015 by the International Netball Federation.

=== Venue ===
All matches at the event were held at the Liverpool Arena (known for sponsorship reasons as M&S Bank Arena), which has a seating capacity of 11,000. The venue is the centrepiece of the ACC Liverpool sporting and events precinct, allowing the event's other amenities, such as warm-up and administration facilities, to take place within the one location.

== Broadcasters ==
This is a list of the broadcasters for the tournament in competing countries and regions.

Country	Broadcaster
Australia	Nine Network
Barbados	Flow Sport
Fiji	Digicel
New Zealand	Sky Sport
Samoa	Digicel
South Africa	SuperSport
Trinidad and Tobago	Flow Sport
United Kingdom	Sky Sports & BBC

== Umpires ==
Seventeen umpires from seven countries officiated matches at the tournament.

Nation	Umpire
AUS	Marc Henning
AUS	Josh Bowring
AUS	Helen George
AUS	Michelle Phippard
ENG	Louise Travis
ENG	Gary Burgess
ENG	Kate Stephenson
ENG	Jackie Mizon
RSA	Anso Kemp
RSA	Janet Edeling
RSA	Elizna Van den Berg
TRI	Lilia Mathurin-Cameron
JAM	Terrence Peart
NZL	Angela Armstrong-Lush
NZL	Lisa Douglas
NZL	Gareth Fowler
SIN	Joan Yuliani

== Teams ==
=== Qualification ===
Sixteen teams contested the 2019 title. Five teams automatically qualified by virtue of their high ranking position in the INF World Rankings, and England qualified as the host nation. The remaining ten teams qualified via regional qualification tournaments, with two teams selected from each of the five international netball regions; Africa, Americas, Asia, Europe and Oceania. The five teams (six if England is included) to be granted automatic qualification, in order of seeding were:

- Australia
- England (host nation)
- New Zealand
- Jamaica
- South Africa
- Malawi

Qualification tournaments

Region	Host	Teams	Dates	Qualified
Europe	Scotland	3	19–21 January 2018	Scotland; Northern Ireland
Oceania	New Zealand	5	17–21 April 2018	Fiji; Samoa
Africa	Zambia	6	13–18 August 2018	Uganda; Zimbabwe
Americas	Barbados	8	24 August–2 September 2018	Trinidad and Tobago; Barbados
Asia	Singapore	9	1–9 September 2018	Sri Lanka; Singapore

== Format ==
A new format was introduced for the edition. Teams competed in three stages; the Preliminaries Stage One (12–14 July), Preliminaries Stage Two (15–18 July) and the Play-offs and Placings matches (19–21 July).

Preliminaries Stage One
There were four groups (A, B, C and D) of four teams in the first stage, with the top eight teams pre-assigned to their groups and one team from the 9th–12th seeds and one from the 13th–16th seeds drawn randomly into each group. However no more than two teams from the one region can be drawn into the same group. The top three teams from each group progressed to the second preliminaries stage.

Preliminaries Stage Two
The top three teams from Groups A and B formed Group F, and the top three teams from Groups C and D formed Group G. The bottom four finishers from Groups A-D competed against one another in Group E. Where teams in Groups F and G have already played each other in the Preliminaries Stage One (i.e. A1 has already played A2 and A3), these results will carry through to the Preliminaries Stage Two.

Play-offs and Placings
The teams finishing first and second in Groups F and G went through to the semi-finals, with the top placed team in each group facing the second placed team in the other group. The winners of each semi-final competed for gold in the final, with the losers playing for bronze.

The teams finishing third and fourth in Groups F and G competed for final positions fifth to eighth – third in one group plays fourth in the other – with the winners playing off for fifth place and the losers for seventh. The teams that finished fifth in Groups F and G played off for ninth and 10th places. The teams that finished last in Groups F and G played off for 11th and 12th places. The teams that finished first and second in Group E played off for 13th and 14th place and the teams that finish third and fourth in Group E played off for the 15th and 16th places.

== Preliminaries Stage One ==
=== Group A ===
Pos	Team	Pld	W	D	L	GF	GA	%	Pts
1	Australia	3	3	0	0	260	85	305.9	6
2	Zimbabwe	3	2	0	1	167	171	97.7	4
3	Northern Ireland	3	1	0	2	140	189	74.1	2
4	Sri Lanka	3	0	0	3	123	245	50.2	0

12 July; 11:00 (BST)	Report; Stats	Australia	88–24	Northern Ireland	Liverpool Arena (Court One); Umpires: J. Mizon (England); G. Fowler (New Zealand); Reserve umpire: L. Mathurin-Cameron (Trinidad and Tobago)
12 July; 11:00 (BST)	Report; Stats	Scoring by quarter: 24–7, 21–8, 22–4, 21–5			Liverpool Arena (Court One); Umpires: J. Mizon (England); G. Fowler (New Zealand); Reserve umpire: L. Mathurin-Cameron (Trinidad and Tobago)
12 July; 11:00 (BST)	Report; Stats	Bassett 33/34 (97%); Thwaites 25/26 (96%); Tippett 18/19 (95%); Wood 12/13 (92%)		Craig 18/22 (82%); Magee 6/16 (38%); Crosbie 0/2 (0%)	Liverpool Arena (Court One); Umpires: J. Mizon (England); G. Fowler (New Zealand); Reserve umpire: L. Mathurin-Cameron (Trinidad and Tobago)

12 July; 11:25 (BST)	Report; Stats	Zimbabwe	79–49	Sri Lanka	Liverpool Arena (Court Two); Umpires: K. Stephenson (England); E. Van den Berg (South Africa); Reserve umpire: M. Henning (Australia)
12 July; 11:25 (BST)	Report; Stats	Scoring by quarter: 19–14, 19–15, 15–13, 26–7			Liverpool Arena (Court Two); Umpires: K. Stephenson (England); E. Van den Berg (South Africa); Reserve umpire: M. Henning (Australia)
12 July; 11:25 (BST)	Report; Stats	Takaidza 59/62 (95%); Ndlovu 14/15 (93%); Bwanali 6/7 (86%)		Sivalingam 44/45 (98%); Wannithileka 5/5 (100%)	Liverpool Arena (Court Two); Umpires: K. Stephenson (England); E. Van den Berg (South Africa); Reserve umpire: M. Henning (Australia)

13 July; 09:00 (BST)	Report; Stats	Australia	73–37	Zimbabwe	Liverpool Arena (Court One); Umpires: T. Peart (Jamaica); J. Edeling (South Africa); Reserve umpire: E. Van den Berg (South Africa)
13 July; 09:00 (BST)	Report; Stats	Scoring by quarter: 18–9, 21–9, 15–13, 19–6			Liverpool Arena (Court One); Umpires: T. Peart (Jamaica); J. Edeling (South Africa); Reserve umpire: E. Van den Berg (South Africa)
13 July; 09:00 (BST)	Report; Stats	Bassett 49/53 (92%); Tippett 24/28 (86%)		Takaidza 15/20 (75%); Jani 11/13 (85%); Bwanali 8/9 (89%); Ndlovu 3/4 (75%)	Liverpool Arena (Court One); Umpires: T. Peart (Jamaica); J. Edeling (South Africa); Reserve umpire: E. Van den Berg (South Africa)

13 July; 09:25 (BST)	Report; Stats	Northern Ireland	67–50	Sri Lanka	Liverpool Arena (Court Two); Umpires: L. Mathurin-Cameron (Trinidad and Tobago); A. Armstrong-Lush (New Zealand); Reserve umpire: M. Phippard (Australia)
13 July; 09:25 (BST)	Report; Stats	Scoring by quarter: 18–13, 16–12, 17–12, 16–13			Liverpool Arena (Court Two); Umpires: L. Mathurin-Cameron (Trinidad and Tobago); A. Armstrong-Lush (New Zealand); Reserve umpire: M. Phippard (Australia)
13 July; 09:25 (BST)	Report; Stats	Magee 29/32 (91%); Armstrong 22/26 (85%); Craig 16/22 (73%)		Sivalingam 47/52 (90%); Wannithileka 2/2 (100%); Sethukavalar 1/1 (100%)	Liverpool Arena (Court Two); Umpires: L. Mathurin-Cameron (Trinidad and Tobago); A. Armstrong-Lush (New Zealand); Reserve umpire: M. Phippard (Australia)

14 July; 15:00 (BST)	Report; Stats	Australia	99–24	Sri Lanka	Liverpool Arena (Court One); Umpires: L. Mathurin-Cameron (Trinidad and Tobago); E. Van den Berg (South Africa); Reserve umpire: T. Peart (Jamaica)
14 July; 15:00 (BST)	Report; Stats	Scoring by quarter: 20–7, 27–8, 28–7, 24–2			Liverpool Arena (Court One); Umpires: L. Mathurin-Cameron (Trinidad and Tobago); E. Van den Berg (South Africa); Reserve umpire: T. Peart (Jamaica)
14 July; 15:00 (BST)	Report; Stats	Thwaites 67/68 (99%); Wood 32/34 (94%)		Sivalingam 16/19 (84%); Wannithileka 8/10 (80%); Mendis 0/2 (0%)	Liverpool Arena (Court One); Umpires: L. Mathurin-Cameron (Trinidad and Tobago); E. Van den Berg (South Africa); Reserve umpire: T. Peart (Jamaica)

14 July; 15:25 (BST)	Report; Stats	Northern Ireland	49–51	Zimbabwe	Liverpool Arena (Court Two); Umpires: K. Stephenson (England); H. George (Australia); Reserve umpire: J. Edeling (South Africa)
14 July; 15:25 (BST)	Report; Stats	Scoring by quarter: 15–12, 12–15, 12–12, 10–12			Liverpool Arena (Court Two); Umpires: K. Stephenson (England); H. George (Australia); Reserve umpire: J. Edeling (South Africa)
14 July; 15:25 (BST)	Report; Stats	Armstrong 29/38 (76%); Magee 20/24 (83%)		Takaidza 44/46 (96%); Ndlovu 5/5 (100%); Bwanali 2/2 (100%)	Liverpool Arena (Court Two); Umpires: K. Stephenson (England); H. George (Australia); Reserve umpire: J. Edeling (South Africa)

=== Group B ===
Pos	Team	Pld	W	D	L	GF	GA	%	Pts
1	New Zealand	3	3	0	0	231	91	253.8	6
2	Malawi	3	2	0	1	197	143	137.8	4
3	Barbados	3	1	0	2	135	177	76.3	2
4	Singapore	3	0	0	3	93	245	38.0	0

12 July; 09:00 (BST)	Report; Stats	New Zealand	64–45	Malawi	Liverpool Arena (Court One); Umpires: J. Bowring (Australia); G. Burgess (England); Reserve umpire: J. Yuliani (Singapore)
12 July; 09:00 (BST)	Report; Stats	Scoring by quarter: 17–11, 15–6, 17–13, 15–15			Liverpool Arena (Court One); Umpires: J. Bowring (Australia); G. Burgess (England); Reserve umpire: J. Yuliani (Singapore)
12 July; 09:00 (BST)	Report; Stats	Folau 39/43 (91%); Ekenasio 20/21 (95%); Selby-Rickit 5/6 (83%)		Mvula 22/27 (81%); Chimaliro 18/22 (82%); Simtowe 4/6 (67%); Kamwala 1/2 (50%)	Liverpool Arena (Court One); Umpires: J. Bowring (Australia); G. Burgess (England); Reserve umpire: J. Yuliani (Singapore)

12 July; 09:25 (BST)	Report; Stats	Barbados	69–34	Singapore	Liverpool Arena (Court Two); Umpires: J. Edeling (South Africa); T. Peart (Jamaica); Reserve umpire: A. Kemp (South Africa)
12 July; 09:25 (BST)	Report; Stats	Scoring by quarter: 17–6, 16–8, 14–10, 22–10			Liverpool Arena (Court Two); Umpires: J. Edeling (South Africa); T. Peart (Jamaica); Reserve umpire: A. Kemp (South Africa)
12 July; 09:25 (BST)	Report; Stats	Wharton 27/29 (93%); Blackman 22/23 (96%); Holder 11/13 (85%); Thomas 9/12 (75%)		Soh 21/31 (68%); Tan 9/10 (90%); Toh 3/7 (43%); Lee 1/3 (33%)	Liverpool Arena (Court Two); Umpires: J. Edeling (South Africa); T. Peart (Jamaica); Reserve umpire: A. Kemp (South Africa)

13 July; 11:00 (BST)	Report; Stats	New Zealand	78–25	Barbados	Liverpool Arena (Court One); Umpires: L. Travis (England); J. Yuliani (Singapore); Reserve umpire: H. George (Australia)
13 July; 11:00 (BST)	Report; Stats	Scoring by quarter: 16–9, 26–5, 19–6, 17–5			Liverpool Arena (Court One); Umpires: L. Travis (England); J. Yuliani (Singapore); Reserve umpire: H. George (Australia)
13 July; 11:00 (BST)	Report; Stats	Mes 30/33 (91%); Folau 21/24 (88%); Selby-Rickit 20/22 (91%); Ekenasio 7/8 (88%)		Wharton 14/17 (82%); Thomas 4/6 (67%); Holder 4/6 (67%); Blackman 3/4 (75%)	Liverpool Arena (Court One); Umpires: L. Travis (England); J. Yuliani (Singapore); Reserve umpire: H. George (Australia)

13 July; 11:25 (BST)	Report; Stats	Malawi	87–38	Singapore	Liverpool Arena (Court Two); Umpires: J. Mizon (England); A. Kemp (South Africa); Reserve umpire: J. Bowring (Australia)
13 July; 11:25 (BST)	Report; Stats	Scoring by quarter: 27–11, 18–9, 18–10, 24–8			Liverpool Arena (Court Two); Umpires: J. Mizon (England); A. Kemp (South Africa); Reserve umpire: J. Bowring (Australia)
13 July; 11:25 (BST)	Report; Stats	Mvula 31/33 (94%); Kamwala 27/32 (84%); Chimaliro 23/24 (96%); Simtowe 6/6 (100%)		Soh 15/17 (88%); Tan 11/13 (85%); Toh 7/12 (58%); Lee 5/7 (71%)	Liverpool Arena (Court Two); Umpires: J. Mizon (England); A. Kemp (South Africa); Reserve umpire: J. Bowring (Australia)

14 July; 09:00 (BST)	Report; Stats	New Zealand	89–21	Singapore	Liverpool Arena (Court One); Umpires: J. Mizon (England); T. Peart (Jamaica); Reserve umpire: L. Mathurin-Cameron (Trinidad and Tobago)
14 July; 09:00 (BST)	Report; Stats	Scoring by quarter: 20–5, 23–3, 20–6, 26–7			Liverpool Arena (Court One); Umpires: J. Mizon (England); T. Peart (Jamaica); Reserve umpire: L. Mathurin-Cameron (Trinidad and Tobago)
14 July; 09:00 (BST)	Report; Stats	Selby-Rickit 37/39 (95%); Folau 27/28 (96%); Ekenasio 15/20 (75%); Mes 10/11 (91%)		Soh 11/18 (61%); Toh 8/13 (62%); Tan 1/5 (20%); Lee 1/1 (100%)	Liverpool Arena (Court One); Umpires: J. Mizon (England); T. Peart (Jamaica); Reserve umpire: L. Mathurin-Cameron (Trinidad and Tobago)

14 July; 09:25 (BST)	Report; Stats	Malawi	65–41	Barbados	Liverpool Arena (Court Two); Umpires: A. Kemp (South Africa); J. Yuliani (Singapore); Reserve umpire: K. Stephenson (England)
14 July; 09:25 (BST)	Report; Stats	Scoring by quarter: 17–9, 18–11, 17–9, 13–12			Liverpool Arena (Court Two); Umpires: A. Kemp (South Africa); J. Yuliani (Singapore); Reserve umpire: K. Stephenson (England)
14 July; 09:25 (BST)	Report; Stats	Mvula 31/33 (94%); Chimaliro 23/25 (92%); Kamwala 8/11 (73%); Simtowe 3/3 (100%)		Wharton 15/18 (83%); Thomas 12/17 (71%); Blackman 11/12 (92%); Holder 3/4 (75%)	Liverpool Arena (Court Two); Umpires: A. Kemp (South Africa); J. Yuliani (Singapore); Reserve umpire: K. Stephenson (England)

=== Group C ===
Pos	Team	Pld	W	D	L	GF	GA	%	Pts
1	South Africa	3	3	0	0	221	132	167.4	6
2	Jamaica	3	2	0	1	205	127	161.4	4
3	Trinidad and Tobago	3	1	0	2	155	200	77.5	2
4	Fiji	3	0	0	3	120	242	49.6	0

12 July; 17:00 (BST)	Report; Stats	Jamaica	85–29	Fiji	Liverpool Arena (Court One); Umpires: L. Douglas (New Zealand); A. Armstrong-Lush (New Zealand); Reserve umpire: G. Burgess (England)
12 July; 17:00 (BST)	Report; Stats	Scoring by quarter: 19–8, 21–6, 27–4, 18–11			Liverpool Arena (Court One); Umpires: L. Douglas (New Zealand); A. Armstrong-Lush (New Zealand); Reserve umpire: G. Burgess (England)
12 July; 17:00 (BST)	Report; Stats	Fowler 33/35 (94%); Aiken 26/36 (72%); Robinson 15/17 (88%); Beckford 11/17 (65%)		Raeluni 10/13 (77%); Panapasa 7/9 (78%); Waqa 6/7 (86%); Vocea 6/8 (75%)	Liverpool Arena (Court One); Umpires: L. Douglas (New Zealand); A. Armstrong-Lush (New Zealand); Reserve umpire: G. Burgess (England)

12 July; 17:25 (BST)	Report; Stats	South Africa	76–45	Trinidad and Tobago	Liverpool Arena (Court Two); Umpires: H. George (Australia); L. Travis (England); Reserve umpire: T. Peart (Jamaica)
12 July; 17:25 (BST)	Report; Stats	Scoring by quarter: 19–15, 21–11, 16–8, 20–11			Liverpool Arena (Court Two); Umpires: H. George (Australia); L. Travis (England); Reserve umpire: T. Peart (Jamaica)
12 July; 17:25 (BST)	Report; Stats	Potgieter 42/43 (98%); Holtzhausen 18/22 (82%); Burger 16/18 (89%)		Wallace 28/30 (93%); McCollin 11/14 (79%); McCarthy 6/7 (86%)	Liverpool Arena (Court Two); Umpires: H. George (Australia); L. Travis (England); Reserve umpire: T. Peart (Jamaica)

13 July; 17:00 (BST)	Report; Stats	Jamaica	68–43	Trinidad and Tobago	Liverpool Arena (Court One); Umpires: M. Phippard (Australia); G. Burgess (England); Reserve umpire: L. Travis (England)
13 July; 17:00 (BST)	Report; Stats	Scoring by quarter: 17–15, 25–8, 15–11, 11–9			Liverpool Arena (Court One); Umpires: M. Phippard (Australia); G. Burgess (England); Reserve umpire: L. Travis (England)
13 July; 17:00 (BST)	Report; Stats	Fowler 38/40 (95%); Beckford 12/14 (86%); Robinson 11/20 (55%); Aiken 7/13 (54%)		McCollin 19/21 (90%); Wallace 19/24 (79%); McCarthy 5/6 (83%)	Liverpool Arena (Court One); Umpires: M. Phippard (Australia); G. Burgess (England); Reserve umpire: L. Travis (England)

13 July; 17:25 (BST)	Report; Stats	South Africa	90–35	Fiji	Liverpool Arena (Court Two); Umpires: K. Stephenson (England); L. Douglas (New Zealand); Reserve umpire: J. Mizon (England)
13 July; 17:25 (BST)	Report; Stats	Scoring by quarter: 24–9, 23–10, 20–6, 23–10			Liverpool Arena (Court Two); Umpires: K. Stephenson (England); L. Douglas (New Zealand); Reserve umpire: J. Mizon (England)
13 July; 17:25 (BST)	Report; Stats	Potgieter 33/34 (97%); Burger 32/36 (89%); Stoltz 21/25 (84%); Holtzhausen 4/4 (100%)		Rauluni 13/18 (72%); Panapasa 11/11 (100%); Vocea 8/13 (62%); Waqa 3/5 (60%)	Liverpool Arena (Court Two); Umpires: K. Stephenson (England); L. Douglas (New Zealand); Reserve umpire: J. Mizon (England)

14 July; 17:00 (BST)	Report; Stats	Jamaica	52–55	South Africa	Liverpool Arena (Court One); Umpires: M. Phippard (Australia); J. Bowring (Australia); Reserve umpire: J. Yuliani (Singapore)
14 July; 17:00 (BST)	Report; Stats	Scoring by quarter: 9–16, 12–16, 17–10, 14–13			Liverpool Arena (Court One); Umpires: M. Phippard (Australia); J. Bowring (Australia); Reserve umpire: J. Yuliani (Singapore)
14 July; 17:00 (BST)	Report; Stats	Fowler 38/39 (97%); Beckford 14/19 (74%)		Potgieter 36/39 (92%); Holtzhausen 19/29 (66%)	Liverpool Arena (Court One); Umpires: M. Phippard (Australia); J. Bowring (Australia); Reserve umpire: J. Yuliani (Singapore)

14 July; 17:25 (BST)	Report; Stats	Trinidad and Tobago	67–56	Fiji	Liverpool Arena (Court Two); Umpires: L. Travis (England); G. Fowler (New Zealand); Reserve umpire: A. Kemp (South Africa)
14 July; 17:25 (BST)	Report; Stats	Scoring by quarter: 23–10, 17–15, 17–15, 10–16			Liverpool Arena (Court Two); Umpires: L. Travis (England); G. Fowler (New Zealand); Reserve umpire: A. Kemp (South Africa)
14 July; 17:25 (BST)	Report; Stats	Wallace 40/42 (95%); McCollin 21/29 (72%); McCarthy 3/5 (60%); Hollingsworths 3/5 (60%)		Panapasa 33/35 (94%); Rauluni 23/26 (88%)	Liverpool Arena (Court Two); Umpires: L. Travis (England); G. Fowler (New Zealand); Reserve umpire: A. Kemp (South Africa)

=== Group D ===
Pos	Team	Pld	W	D	L	GF	GA	%	Pts
1	England (H)	3	3	0	0	224	90	248.9	6
2	Uganda	3	2	0	1	153	155	98.7	4
3	Scotland	3	1	0	2	130	157	82.8	2
4	Samoa	3	0	0	3	107	212	50.5	0

(H) Host.

12 July; 19:00 (BST)	Report; Stats	England	64–32	Uganda	Liverpool Arena (Court One); Umpires: M. Phippard (Australia); H. Henning (Australia); Reserve umpire: G. Fowler (New Zealand)
12 July; 19:00 (BST)	Report; Stats	Scoring by quarter: 15–6, 16–12, 13–8, 20–6			Liverpool Arena (Court One); Umpires: M. Phippard (Australia); H. Henning (Australia); Reserve umpire: G. Fowler (New Zealand)
12 July; 19:00 (BST)	Report; Stats	Harten 29/35 (83%); Housby 18/19 (95%); Dunn 17/19 (89%)		Proscovia 20/23 (87%); Nanyonga 12/14 (86%)	Liverpool Arena (Court One); Umpires: M. Phippard (Australia); H. Henning (Australia); Reserve umpire: G. Fowler (New Zealand)

12 July; 19:25 (BST)	Report; Stats	Scotland	53–35	Samoa	Liverpool Arena (Court Two); Umpires: A. Kemp (South Africa); J. Yuliani (Singapore); Reserve umpire: J. Edeling (South Africa)
12 July; 19:25 (BST)	Report; Stats	Scoring by quarter: 9–7, 15–9, 17–10, 9–12			Liverpool Arena (Court Two); Umpires: A. Kemp (South Africa); J. Yuliani (Singapore); Reserve umpire: J. Edeling (South Africa)
12 July; 19:25 (BST)	Report; Stats	Gallagher 23/27 (85%); Goodwin 21/25 (84%); Barrie 8/9 (89%); McCall 1/1 (100%)		Tanimo 18/20 (90%); To'o 10/12 (83%); Salanoa 5/6 (83%); Autagavaia 2/3 (67%)	Liverpool Arena (Court Two); Umpires: A. Kemp (South Africa); J. Yuliani (Singapore); Reserve umpire: J. Edeling (South Africa)

13 July; 15:00 (BST)	Report; Stats	England	70–34	Scotland	Liverpool Arena (Court One); Umpires: E. Van den Berg (South Africa); H. George (Australia); Reserve umpire: L. Douglas (New Zealand)
13 July; 15:00 (BST)	Report; Stats	Scoring by quarter: 18–9, 17–11, 20–6, 15–8			Liverpool Arena (Court One); Umpires: E. Van den Berg (South Africa); H. George (Australia); Reserve umpire: L. Douglas (New Zealand)
13 July; 15:00 (BST)	Report; Stats	Dunn 49/52 (94%); Housby 14/16 (88%); Haythornthwaite 4/4 (100%); Harten 3/4 (75%)		Gallagher 13/14 (93%); Barrie 11/13 (85%); Goodwin 9/12 (75%); McCall 1/2 (50%)	Liverpool Arena (Court One); Umpires: E. Van den Berg (South Africa); H. George (Australia); Reserve umpire: L. Douglas (New Zealand)

13 July; 15:25 (BST)	Report; Stats	Uganda	69–48	Samoa	Liverpool Arena (Court Two); Umpires: J. Bowling (Australia); G. Fowler (New Zealand); Reserve umpire: A. Armstrong-Lush (New Zealand)
13 July; 15:25 (BST)	Report; Stats	Scoring by quarter: 22–11, 18–12, 17–10, 12–15			Liverpool Arena (Court Two); Umpires: J. Bowling (Australia); G. Fowler (New Zealand); Reserve umpire: A. Armstrong-Lush (New Zealand)
13 July; 15:25 (BST)	Report; Stats	Cholock 34/39 (87%); Oyella 17/18 (94%); Proscovia 16/18 (89%); Nanyonga 2/2 (100%)		Salanoa 25/26 (96%); To'o 20/25 (80%); Tanimo 3/4 (75%)	Liverpool Arena (Court Two); Umpires: J. Bowling (Australia); G. Fowler (New Zealand); Reserve umpire: A. Armstrong-Lush (New Zealand)

14 July; 11:00 (BST)	Report; Stats	England	90–24	Samoa	Liverpool Arena (Court One); Umpires: L. Douglas (New Zealand); J. Edeling (South Africa); Reserve umpire: M. Phippard (Australia)
14 July; 11:00 (BST)	Report; Stats	Scoring by quarter: 22–7, 21–4, 22–7, 25–6			Liverpool Arena (Court One); Umpires: L. Douglas (New Zealand); J. Edeling (South Africa); Reserve umpire: M. Phippard (Australia)
14 July; 11:00 (BST)	Report; Stats	Harten 40/41 (98%); Dunn 30/34 (88%); Housby 10/12 (83%); Haythornthwaite 9/11 (82%)		Tanimo 8/9 (89%); Salanoa 8/8 (100%); Autagavaia 6/8 (75%); To'o 2/4 (50%)	Liverpool Arena (Court One); Umpires: L. Douglas (New Zealand); J. Edeling (South Africa); Reserve umpire: M. Phippard (Australia)

14 July; 11:25 (BST)	Report; Stats	Uganda	52–43	Scotland	Liverpool Arena (Court Two); Umpires: G. Burgess (England); A. Armstrong-Lush (New Zealand); Reserve umpire: G. Fowler (New Zealand)
14 July; 11:25 (BST)	Report; Stats	Scoring by quarter: 16–11, 13–10, 11–12, 12–10			Liverpool Arena (Court Two); Umpires: G. Burgess (England); A. Armstrong-Lush (New Zealand); Reserve umpire: G. Fowler (New Zealand)
14 July; 11:25 (BST)	Report; Stats	Oyella 27/28 (96%); Proscovia 19/25 (76%); Cholock 6/7 (86%)		Barrie 23/29 (79%); Gallagher 18/20 (90%); Goodwin 2/3 (67%)	Liverpool Arena (Court Two); Umpires: G. Burgess (England); A. Armstrong-Lush (New Zealand); Reserve umpire: G. Fowler (New Zealand)

== Preliminaries Stage Two ==
=== Group E ===
Group E contains the four bottom teams from Groups A-D and compete for final placings 13th to 16th.

Pos	Team	Pld	W	D	L	GF	GA	%	Pts
1	Samoa	3	3	0	0	189	158	119.6	6
2	Fiji	3	2	0	1	184	155	118.7	4
3	Sri Lanka	3	1	0	2	187	174	107.5	2
4	Singapore	3	0	0	3	155	222	69.8	0

15 July; 11:25 (BST)	Report; Stats	Sri Lanka	88–50	Singapore	Liverpool Arena (Court Two); Umpires: T. Peart (Jamaica); E. Van den Berg (South Africa); Reserve umpire: H. George (Australia)
15 July; 11:25 (BST)	Report; Stats	Scoring by quarter: 21–11, 24–11, 26–14, 17–14			Liverpool Arena (Court Two); Umpires: T. Peart (Jamaica); E. Van den Berg (South Africa); Reserve umpire: H. George (Australia)
15 July; 11:25 (BST)	Report; Stats	Sivalingam 76/78 (97%); Sethukavalar 6/7 (86%); Mendis 3/3 (100%); Ambeygoda 3/4 (75%)		Toh 16/22 (73%); Soh 15/18 (83%); Lee 15/18 (83%); Tan 4/4 (100%)	Liverpool Arena (Court Two); Umpires: T. Peart (Jamaica); E. Van den Berg (South Africa); Reserve umpire: H. George (Australia)

15 July; 15:25 (BST)	Report; Stats	Fiji	54–55	Samoa	Liverpool Arena (Court Two); Umpires: H. George (Australia); A. Armstrong-Lush (New Zealand); Reserve umpire: L. Douglas (New Zealand)
15 July; 15:25 (BST)	Report; Stats	Scoring by quarter: 16–18, 14–15, 12–7, 12–15			Liverpool Arena (Court Two); Umpires: H. George (Australia); A. Armstrong-Lush (New Zealand); Reserve umpire: L. Douglas (New Zealand)
15 July; 15:25 (BST)	Report; Stats	Panapasa 42/44 (95%); Rauluni 12/17 (71%)		Salanoa 32/33 (97%); To'o 14/16 (88%); Tanimo 9/10 (90%)	Liverpool Arena (Court Two); Umpires: H. George (Australia); A. Armstrong-Lush (New Zealand); Reserve umpire: L. Douglas (New Zealand)

16 July; 09:00 (BST)	Report; Stats	Fiji	71–56	Singapore	Liverpool Arena; Umpires: J. Edeling (South Africa); E. Van den Berg (South Africa); Reserve umpire: A. Armstrong-Lush (New Zealand)
16 July; 09:00 (BST)	Report; Stats	Scoring by quarter: 22–12, 13–14, 17–14, 19–16			Liverpool Arena; Umpires: J. Edeling (South Africa); E. Van den Berg (South Africa); Reserve umpire: A. Armstrong-Lush (New Zealand)
16 July; 09:00 (BST)	Report; Stats	Panapasa 41/44 (93%); Vocea 17/21 (81%); Rauluni 8/11 (73%); Waqa 5/7 (71%)		Soh 37/42 (88%); Lee 13/16 (81%); Toh 6/8 (75%)	Liverpool Arena; Umpires: J. Edeling (South Africa); E. Van den Berg (South Africa); Reserve umpire: A. Armstrong-Lush (New Zealand)

16 July; 11:00 (BST)	Report; Stats	Sri Lanka	55–65	Samoa	Liverpool Arena; Umpires: J. Mizon (England); L. Travis (England); Reserve umpire: T. Peart (Jamaica)
16 July; 11:00 (BST)	Report; Stats	Scoring by quarter: 17–13, 10–19, 13–17, 15–16			Liverpool Arena; Umpires: J. Mizon (England); L. Travis (England); Reserve umpire: T. Peart (Jamaica)
16 July; 11:00 (BST)	Report; Stats	Sivalingam 52/58 (90%); Wannithileka 3/3 (100%)		Tanimo 42/44 (95%); To'o 20/25 (80%); Salanoa 3/3 (100%)	Liverpool Arena; Umpires: J. Mizon (England); L. Travis (England); Reserve umpire: T. Peart (Jamaica)

17 July; 09:00 (BST)	Report; Stats	Sri Lanka	44–59	Fiji	Liverpool Arena; Umpires: L. Mathurin-Cameron (Trinidad and Tobago); T. Peart (Jamaica); Reserve umpire: E. Van den Berg (South Africa)
17 July; 09:00 (BST)	Report; Stats	Scoring by quarter: 11–10, 9–17, 8–20, 16–12			Liverpool Arena; Umpires: L. Mathurin-Cameron (Trinidad and Tobago); T. Peart (Jamaica); Reserve umpire: E. Van den Berg (South Africa)
17 July; 09:00 (BST)	Report; Stats	Sivalingam 36/39 (92%); Mendis 6/11 (55%); Wannithileka 2/5 (40%)		Rauluni 29/37 (78%); Vocea 25/29 (86%); Panapasa 5/6 (83%)	Liverpool Arena; Umpires: L. Mathurin-Cameron (Trinidad and Tobago); T. Peart (Jamaica); Reserve umpire: E. Van den Berg (South Africa)

17 July; 11:00 (BST)	Report; Stats	Singapore	49–63	Samoa	Liverpool Arena; Umpires: M. Phippard (Australia); A. Armstrong-Lush (New Zealand); Reserve umpire: K. Stephenson (England)
17 July; 11:00 (BST)	Report; Stats	Scoring by quarter: 9–16, 12–15, 13–13, 15–19			Liverpool Arena; Umpires: M. Phippard (Australia); A. Armstrong-Lush (New Zealand); Reserve umpire: K. Stephenson (England)
17 July; 11:00 (BST)	Report; Stats	Soh 21/27 (78%); Tan 17/19 (89%); Toh 9/13 (69%); Lee 2/4 (50%)		Tanimo 45/48 (94%); Salanoa 11/11 (100%); Autagavaia 6/7 (86%); To'o 1/2 (50%)	Liverpool Arena; Umpires: M. Phippard (Australia); A. Armstrong-Lush (New Zealand); Reserve umpire: K. Stephenson (England)

=== Group F ===
The top three teams from Groups A and B advance to Group F. All six teams previously played two matches against Group F teams – for example, each team in Group A played the two other Group A teams who advanced to Group F. At the start of Group F the table is initialised to include the results of these two Group A or Group B matches for each team. The former Group A teams play the former Group B teams in three rounds of three matches in Group F.

Teams finishing first and second in Group F go through to the semi-finals – the top team in Group F plays the second team in Group G and the second team in Group F plays the top team in Group G. The four remaining teams in Group F compete for the final placings from 5th to 12th.

Pos	Team	Pld	W	D	L	GF	GA	%	Pts
1	Australia (Q)	5	5	0	0	376	157	239.5	10
2	New Zealand (Q)	5	4	0	1	347	184	188.6	8
3	Malawi	5	3	0	2	233	301	77.4	6
4	Zimbabwe	5	2	0	3	241	265	90.9	4
5	Northern Ireland	5	1	0	4	190	306	62.1	2
6	Barbados	5	0	0	5	172	346	49.7	0

(Q) Qualified to semi-finals.

15 July; 09:00 (BST)	Report; Stats	Zimbabwe	36–79	New Zealand	Liverpool Arena (Court One); Umpires: J. Mizon (England); J. Edeling (South Africa); Reserve umpire: E. Van den Berg (South Africa)
15 July; 09:00 (BST)	Report; Stats	Scoring by quarter: 10–21, 8–19, 8–19, 10–20			Liverpool Arena (Court One); Umpires: J. Mizon (England); J. Edeling (South Africa); Reserve umpire: E. Van den Berg (South Africa)
15 July; 09:00 (BST)	Report; Stats	Jani 13/13 (100%); Makusha 7/9 (78%); Takaidza 7/9 (78%); Bwanali 5/5 (100%); Ndlovu 4/7 (57%)		Ekenasio 25/30 (83%); Selby-Rickit 23/23 (100%); Folai 23/25 (92%); Mes 8/10 (80%)	Liverpool Arena (Court One); Umpires: J. Mizon (England); J. Edeling (South Africa); Reserve umpire: E. Van den Berg (South Africa)

15 July; 09:25 (BST)	Report; Stats	Northern Ireland	43–47	Malawi	Liverpool Arena (Court Two); Umpires: L. Douglas (New Zealand); G. Burgess (England); Reserve umpire: A. Armstrong-Lush (New Zealand)
15 July; 09:25 (BST)	Report; Stats	Scoring by quarter: 9–12, 11–10, 12–12, 11–13			Liverpool Arena (Court Two); Umpires: L. Douglas (New Zealand); G. Burgess (England); Reserve umpire: A. Armstrong-Lush (New Zealand)
15 July; 09:25 (BST)	Report; Stats	Armstrong 22/29 (76%); Magee 19/27 (70%); Craig 2/2 (100%)		Mvula 30/31 (97%); Chimaliro 15/18 (83%); Simtowe 2/2 (100%)	Liverpool Arena (Court Two); Umpires: L. Douglas (New Zealand); G. Burgess (England); Reserve umpire: A. Armstrong-Lush (New Zealand)

15 July; 11:00 (BST)	Report; Stats	Australia	91–22	Barbados	Liverpool Arena (Court One); Umpires: A. Kemp (South Africa); L. Mathurin-Cameron (Trinidad and Tobago); Reserve umpire: L. Travis (England)
15 July; 11:00 (BST)	Report; Stats	Scoring by quarter: 23–5, 23–2, 25–8, 20–7			Liverpool Arena (Court One); Umpires: A. Kemp (South Africa); L. Mathurin-Cameron (Trinidad and Tobago); Reserve umpire: L. Travis (England)
15 July; 11:00 (BST)	Report; Stats	Bassett 26/30 (87%); Tippett 25/26 (96%); Thwaites 20/20 (100%); Wood 20/23 (87%)		Wharton 20/24 (83%); Thomas 2/6 (33%)	Liverpool Arena (Court One); Umpires: A. Kemp (South Africa); L. Mathurin-Cameron (Trinidad and Tobago); Reserve umpire: L. Travis (England)

16 July; 15:00 (BST)	Report; Stats	Northern Ireland	28–77	New Zealand	Liverpool Arena; Umpires: A. Kemp (South Africa); K. Stephenson (England); Reserve umpire: L. Mathurin-Cameron (Trinidad and Tobago)
16 July; 15:00 (BST)	Report; Stats	Scoring by quarter: 7–22, 4–22, 6–17, 11–16			Liverpool Arena; Umpires: A. Kemp (South Africa); K. Stephenson (England); Reserve umpire: L. Mathurin-Cameron (Trinidad and Tobago)
16 July; 15:00 (BST)	Report; Stats	Magee 14/22 (64%); Crosbie 6/9 (67%); Craig 5/7 (71%); Armstrong 3/6 (50%)		Folau 31/36 (86%); Ekenasio 26/28 (93%); Selby-Rickit 10/11 (91%); Mes 10/11 (91%)	Liverpool Arena; Umpires: A. Kemp (South Africa); K. Stephenson (England); Reserve umpire: L. Mathurin-Cameron (Trinidad and Tobago)

16 July; 17:00 (BST)	Report; Stats	Australia	74–25	Malawi	Liverpool Arena; Umpires: G. Burgess (England); J. Yuliani (Singapore); Reserve umpire: G. Fowler (New Zealand)
16 July; 17:00 (BST)	Report; Stats	Scoring by quarter: 21–2, 20–3, 20–9, 13–11			Liverpool Arena; Umpires: G. Burgess (England); J. Yuliani (Singapore); Reserve umpire: G. Fowler (New Zealand)
16 July; 17:00 (BST)	Report; Stats	Bassett 24/28 (86%); Thwaites 22/22 (100%); Tippett 17/18 (94%); Wood 11/11 (100%)		Chimaliro 12/17 (71%); Simtowe 10/12 (83%); Kamwala 3/6 (50%)	Liverpool Arena; Umpires: G. Burgess (England); J. Yuliani (Singapore); Reserve umpire: G. Fowler (New Zealand)

16 July; 19:00 (BST)	Report; Stats	Zimbabwe	66–41	Barbados	Liverpool Arena; Umpires: M. Henning (Australia); L. Douglas (New Zealand); Reserve umpire: H, George (Australia)
16 July; 19:00 (BST)	Report; Stats	Scoring by quarter: 17–11, 16–8, 15–13, 18–9			Liverpool Arena; Umpires: M. Henning (Australia); L. Douglas (New Zealand); Reserve umpire: H, George (Australia)
16 July; 19:00 (BST)	Report; Stats	Jani 51/53 (96%); Bwanali 11/16 (69%); Ndlovu 4/5 (80%)		Wharton 28/30 (93%); Holder 7/7 (100%); Thomas 6/9 (67%)	Liverpool Arena; Umpires: M. Henning (Australia); L. Douglas (New Zealand); Reserve umpire: H, George (Australia)

18 July; 08:30 (BST)	Report; Stats	Northern Ireland	46–43	Barbados	Liverpool Arena; Umpires: E. Van der Berg (South Africa); A. Kemp (South Africa); Reserve umpire: J. Edeling (South Africa)
18 July; 08:30 (BST)	Report; Stats	Scoring by quarter: 12–13, 11–10, 12–8, 11–12			Liverpool Arena; Umpires: E. Van der Berg (South Africa); A. Kemp (South Africa); Reserve umpire: J. Edeling (South Africa)
18 July; 08:30 (BST)	Report; Stats	Magee 22/29 (76%); Armstrong 19/21 (90%); Craig 3/4 (75%); Crosbie 2/4 (50%)		Wharton 24/26 (92%); Blackman 19/20 (95%)	Liverpool Arena; Umpires: E. Van der Berg (South Africa); A. Kemp (South Africa); Reserve umpire: J. Edeling (South Africa)

18 July; 10:30 (BST)	Report; Stats	Australia	50–49	New Zealand	Liverpool Arena; Umpires: G. Burgess (England); K. Stephenson (England); Reserve umpire: L. Travis (England)
18 July; 10:30 (BST)	Report; Stats	Scoring by quarter: 13–10, 15–12, 12–14, 10–13			Liverpool Arena; Umpires: G. Burgess (England); K. Stephenson (England); Reserve umpire: L. Travis (England)
18 July; 10:30 (BST)	Report; Stats	Bassett 37/41 (90%); Wood 13/16 (81%)		Folau 21/24 (88%); Ekenasio 20/24 (83%); Mes 8/10 (80%)	Liverpool Arena; Umpires: G. Burgess (England); K. Stephenson (England); Reserve umpire: L. Travis (England)

18 July; 12:30 (BST)	Report; Stats	Zimbabwe	43–59	Malawi	Liverpool Arena; Umpires: J. Yuliani (Singapore); L. Douglas (New Zealand); Reserve umpire: H. George (Australia)
18 July; 12:30 (BST)	Report; Stats	Scoring by quarter: 8–12, 10–16, 11–15, 14–16			Liverpool Arena; Umpires: J. Yuliani (Singapore); L. Douglas (New Zealand); Reserve umpire: H. George (Australia)
18 July; 12:30 (BST)	Report; Stats	Takaidza 22/24 (92%); Jani 13/15 (87%); Ndlovu 4/5 (80%); Bwanali 4/6 (67%)		Mvula 41/43 (95%); Chimaliro 18/20 (90%)	Liverpool Arena; Umpires: J. Yuliani (Singapore); L. Douglas (New Zealand); Reserve umpire: H. George (Australia)

=== Group G ===
The top three teams from Groups C and D advance to Group G. All six teams previously played two matches against Group G teams – for example, each team in Group C played the two other Group C teams who advanced to Group G. At the start of Group G the table is initialised to include the results of these two Group C or Group D matches for each team. The former Group C teams play the former Group D teams in three rounds of three matches in Group G.

Teams finishing first and second in Group G go through to the semi-finals – the top team in Group G plays the second team in Group F and the second team in Group G plays the top team in Group F. The four remaining teams in Group G compete for the final placings from 5th to 12th.

Pos	Team	Pld	W	D	L	GF	GA	%	Pts
1	England (H) (Q)	5	5	0	0	320	207	154.6	10
2	South Africa (Q)	5	4	0	1	311	233	133.5	8
3	Jamaica	5	3	0	2	292	229	127.5	6
4	Uganda	5	2	0	3	220	285	77.2	4
5	Trinidad and Tobago	5	0	1	4	231	316	73.1	1
6	Scotland	5	0	1	4	194	298	65.1	1

(Q) Qualified to semi-finals. (H) Host.

15 July; 15:00 (BST)	Report; Stats	Jamaica	48–56	England	Liverpool Arena (Court One); Umpires: M. Phippard (Australia); G. Fowler (New Zealand); Reserve umpire: J. Bowring (Australia)
15 July; 15:00 (BST)	Report; Stats	Scoring by quarter: 12–14, 14–14, 10–16, 12–12			Liverpool Arena (Court One); Umpires: M. Phippard (Australia); G. Fowler (New Zealand); Reserve umpire: J. Bowring (Australia)
15 July; 15:00 (BST)	Report; Stats	Fowler 43/43 (100%); Beckford 5/9 (56%)		Harten 27/30 (90%); Housby 29/34 (85%)	Liverpool Arena (Court One); Umpires: M. Phippard (Australia); G. Fowler (New Zealand); Reserve umpire: J. Bowring (Australia)

15 July; 17:00 (BST)	Report; Stats	Trinidad and Tobago	54–57	Uganda	Liverpool Arena (Court One); Umpires: J. Yuliani (Singapore); J. Bowring (Australia); Reserve umpire: G. Burgess (England)
15 July; 17:00 (BST)	Report; Stats	Scoring by quarter: 17–15, 14–15, 10–16, 13–11			Liverpool Arena (Court One); Umpires: J. Yuliani (Singapore); J. Bowring (Australia); Reserve umpire: G. Burgess (England)
15 July; 17:00 (BST)	Report; Stats	Samantha Wallace 38/41 (93%); Kalifa McCollin 16/16 (100%)		Peace Proscovia 23/25 (92%); Nanyonga 1/1 (100%); Oyella 26/29 (90%); Cholock 7/7 (100%)	Liverpool Arena (Court One); Umpires: J. Yuliani (Singapore); J. Bowring (Australia); Reserve umpire: G. Burgess (England)

15 July; 17:25 (BST)	Report; Stats	South Africa	66–38	Scotland	Liverpool Arena (Court Two); Umpires: K. Stephenson (England); L. Travis (England); Reserve umpire: J. Mizon (England)
15 July; 17:25 (BST)	Report; Stats	Scoring by quarter: 15–10, 17–10, 17–12, 17–6			Liverpool Arena (Court Two); Umpires: K. Stephenson (England); L. Travis (England); Reserve umpire: J. Mizon (England)
15 July; 17:25 (BST)	Report; Stats	Burger 26/29 (90%); Holtzhausen 8/9 (89%); Potgieter 30/30 (100%); Stolz 2/6 (33%)		Barrie 10/12 (83%); Gallagher 6/9 (67%); Goodwin 18/24 (75%); McCall 4/7 (57%)	Liverpool Arena (Court Two); Umpires: K. Stephenson (England); L. Travis (England); Reserve umpire: J. Mizon (England)

17 July; 15:00 (BST)	Report; Stats	Trinidad and Tobago	46–72	England	Liverpool Arena; Umpires: H. George (Australia); M. Henning (Australia); Reserve umpire: L. Douglas (New Zealand)
17 July; 15:00 (BST)	Report; Stats	Scoring by quarter: 12–20, 11–19, 10–17, 13–16			Liverpool Arena; Umpires: H. George (Australia); M. Henning (Australia); Reserve umpire: L. Douglas (New Zealand)
17 July; 15:00 (BST)	Report; Stats	Wallace 20/22 (91%); Kalifa McCollin 26/29 (90%)		Dunn 15/19 (79%); Harten 36/40 (90%); Housby 21/24 (88%)	Liverpool Arena; Umpires: H. George (Australia); M. Henning (Australia); Reserve umpire: L. Douglas (New Zealand)

17 July; 17:00 (BST)	Report; Stats	Jamaica	67–36	Scotland	Liverpool Arena; Umpires: A. Kemp (South Africa); L. Travis (England); Reserve umpire: J. Edeling (South Africa)
17 July; 17:00 (BST)	Report; Stats	Scoring by quarter: 13–14, 19–7, 18–5, 17–10			Liverpool Arena; Umpires: A. Kemp (South Africa); L. Travis (England); Reserve umpire: J. Edeling (South Africa)
17 July; 17:00 (BST)	Report; Stats	Aiken 13/16 (81%); Robinson 9/12 (75%); Fowler 45/48 (94%)		Barrie 19/22 (86%); McCall 5/5 (100%); Gallagher 11/11 (100%); Goodwin 1/5 (20%)	Liverpool Arena; Umpires: A. Kemp (South Africa); L. Travis (England); Reserve umpire: J. Edeling (South Africa)

17 July; 19:00 (BST)	Report; Stats	South Africa	67–40	Uganda	Liverpool Arena; Umpires: G. Fowler (New Zealand); J. Bowring (Australia); Reserve umpire: J. Yuliani (Singapore)
17 July; 19:00 (BST)	Report; Stats	Scoring by quarter: 19–10, 12–13, 15–10, 21–7			Liverpool Arena; Umpires: G. Fowler (New Zealand); J. Bowring (Australia); Reserve umpire: J. Yuliani (Singapore)
17 July; 19:00 (BST)	Report; Stats	Potgieter 46/49 (94%); Holtzhausen 21/23 (91%)		Oyella 27/30 (90%); Proscovia 13/14 (93%)	Liverpool Arena; Umpires: G. Fowler (New Zealand); J. Bowring (Australia); Reserve umpire: J. Yuliani (Singapore)

18 July; 16:00 (BST)	Report; Stats	Trinidad and Tobago	43–43	Scotland	Liverpool Arena; Umpires: A. Armstrong-Lush (New Zealand); H. George (Australia); Reserve umpire: A. Kemp (South Africa)
18 July; 16:00 (BST)	Report; Stats	Scoring by quarter: 9–11, 12–11, 13–12, 9–9			Liverpool Arena; Umpires: A. Armstrong-Lush (New Zealand); H. George (Australia); Reserve umpire: A. Kemp (South Africa)
18 July; 16:00 (BST)	Report; Stats	Wallace 29/30 (97%); McCollin 14/17 (82%)		Barrie 17/21 (81%); Gallagher 23/25 (92%); Goodwin 3/5 (60%)	Liverpool Arena; Umpires: A. Armstrong-Lush (New Zealand); H. George (Australia); Reserve umpire: A. Kemp (South Africa)

18 July; 18:00 (BST)	Stats	Jamaica	57–39	Uganda	Liverpool Arena; Umpires: J. Bowring (Australia); M. Henning (Australia); Reserve umpire: J. Mizon (England)
18 July; 18:00 (BST)	Stats	Scoring by quarter: 13–9, 22–16, 16–14, 7–8			Liverpool Arena; Umpires: J. Bowring (Australia); M. Henning (Australia); Reserve umpire: J. Mizon (England)
18 July; 18:00 (BST)	Stats	Fowler 38/39 (97%); Beckford 8/9 (89%); Aiken 8/10 (80%); Robinson 4/5 (80%)		Oyella 8/12 (67%); Nanyonga 11/16 (69%); Proscovia 21/21 (100%)	Liverpool Arena; Umpires: J. Bowring (Australia); M. Henning (Australia); Reserve umpire: J. Mizon (England)

18 July; 20:00 (BST)	Stats	South Africa	47–58	England	Liverpool Arena; Umpires: M. Phippard (Australia); G. Fowler (New Zealand); Reserve umpire: A. Armstrong-Lush (New Zealand)
18 July; 20:00 (BST)	Stats	Scoring by quarter: 11–19, 9–12, 10–12, 17–15			Liverpool Arena; Umpires: M. Phippard (Australia); G. Fowler (New Zealand); Reserve umpire: A. Armstrong-Lush (New Zealand)
18 July; 20:00 (BST)	Stats	Holtzhausen 19/27 (70%); Porgieter 17/21 (81%); Burger 11/12 (92%)		Harten 30/33 (91%); Housby 24/26 (92%); Dunn 4/5 (80%)	Liverpool Arena; Umpires: M. Phippard (Australia); G. Fowler (New Zealand); Reserve umpire: A. Armstrong-Lush (New Zealand)

== Placement matches ==
=== 15th place ===
19 July; 09:00 (BST)	Report; Stats	Sri Lanka	78–57	Singapore	Liverpool Arena; Umpires: L. Travis (England); A. Kemp (South Africa); Reserve umpire: T. Peart (Jamaica)
19 July; 09:00 (BST)	Report; Stats	Scoring by quarter: 23–15, 20–13, 22–12, 13–17			Liverpool Arena; Umpires: L. Travis (England); A. Kemp (South Africa); Reserve umpire: T. Peart (Jamaica)
19 July; 09:00 (BST)	Report; Stats	Sivalingam 77/84 (92%); Mendis 1/2 (50%)		Tan 3/3 (100%); Soh 38/41 (93%); Lee 5/5 (100%); Toh 11/15 (73%)	Liverpool Arena; Umpires: L. Travis (England); A. Kemp (South Africa); Reserve umpire: T. Peart (Jamaica)

=== 13th place ===
19 July; 11:00 (BST)	Report; Stats	Samoa	53–42	Fiji	Liverpool Arena; Umpires: A. Armstrong-Lush (New Zealand); J. Yuliani (Singapore); Reserve umpire: L. Mathurin-Cameron (Trinidad and Tobago)
19 July; 11:00 (BST)	Report; Stats	Scoring by quarter: 11–13, 14–3, 13–15, 15–11			Liverpool Arena; Umpires: A. Armstrong-Lush (New Zealand); J. Yuliani (Singapore); Reserve umpire: L. Mathurin-Cameron (Trinidad and Tobago)
19 July; 11:00 (BST)	Report; Stats	Salanoa 23/24 (96%); To'o 17/20 (85%); Tanimo 13/15 (87%)		Panapasa 22/24 (92%); Rauluni 10/11 (91%); Vocea 10/11 (91%)	Liverpool Arena; Umpires: A. Armstrong-Lush (New Zealand); J. Yuliani (Singapore); Reserve umpire: L. Mathurin-Cameron (Trinidad and Tobago)

=== 11th place ===
20 July; 09:00 (BST)	Report; Stats	Barbados	42–53	Scotland	Liverpool Arena; Umpires: J. Edeling (South Africa); A. Armstrong-Lush (New Zealand); Reserve umpire: K. Stephenson (England)
20 July; 09:00 (BST)	Report; Stats	Scoring by quarter: 13–15, 9–14, 11–10, 9–14			Liverpool Arena; Umpires: J. Edeling (South Africa); A. Armstrong-Lush (New Zealand); Reserve umpire: K. Stephenson (England)
20 July; 09:00 (BST)	Report; Stats	Wharton 31/34 (91%); Holder 4/4 (100%); Blackman 7/10 (70%)		Barrie 24/30 (80%); Gallagher 27/28 (96%); Goodwin 2/2 (100%)	Liverpool Arena; Umpires: J. Edeling (South Africa); A. Armstrong-Lush (New Zealand); Reserve umpire: K. Stephenson (England)

=== 9th place ===
20 July; 17:15 (BST)	Report; Stats	Northern Ireland	48–57	Trinidad and Tobago	Liverpool Arena; Umpires: E. Van den Berg (South Africa); L. Travis (England); Reserve umpire: T. Peart (Jamaica)
20 July; 17:15 (BST)	Report; Stats	Scoring by quarter: 13–12, 10–17, 13–14, 12–14			Liverpool Arena; Umpires: E. Van den Berg (South Africa); L. Travis (England); Reserve umpire: T. Peart (Jamaica)
20 July; 17:15 (BST)	Report; Stats	Armstrong 24/28 (86%); Magee 17/25 (68%); Craig 7/8 (88%)		Wallace 36/38 (95%); McCollin 20/20 (100%); Hollingsworth 1/1 (100%)	Liverpool Arena; Umpires: E. Van den Berg (South Africa); L. Travis (England); Reserve umpire: T. Peart (Jamaica)

=== 5th–8th ===
5–8 placing matches
19 July
Malawi	55
Uganda	44
19 July
Zimbabwe	47
Jamaica	77

5–6 match
21 July
Malawi	50
Jamaica	68
7–8 match
21 July
Uganda	58
Zimbabwe	47

==== 5th–8th play-offs ====
19 July; 15:00 (BST)	Report; Stats	Zimbabwe	47–77	Jamaica	Liverpool Arena; Umpires: H. George (Australia); K. Stephenson (England); Reserve umpire: J. Edeling (South Africa)
19 July; 15:00 (BST)	Report; Stats	Scoring by quarter: 15–23, 9–24, 14–12, 9–18			Liverpool Arena; Umpires: H. George (Australia); K. Stephenson (England); Reserve umpire: J. Edeling (South Africa)
19 July; 15:00 (BST)	Report; Stats	Jani 18/18 (100%); Ndlovu 2/3 (67%); Takaidza 21/26 (81%); Bwanali 6/7 (86%)		Aiken 27/34 (79%); Robinson 16/23 (70%); Fowler 16/16 (100%); Beckford 18/21 (86%)	Liverpool Arena; Umpires: H. George (Australia); K. Stephenson (England); Reserve umpire: J. Edeling (South Africa)

19 July; 17:00 (BST)	Report; Stats	Malawi	55–44	Uganda	Liverpool Arena; Umpires: L. Douglas (New Zealand); M. Henning (Australia); Reserve umpire: E. Van den Berg (South Africa)
19 July; 17:00 (BST)	Report; Stats	Scoring by quarter: 12–9, 15–10, 14–16, 14–9			Liverpool Arena; Umpires: L. Douglas (New Zealand); M. Henning (Australia); Reserve umpire: E. Van den Berg (South Africa)
19 July; 17:00 (BST)	Report; Stats	Mvula 38/43 (88%); Chimaliro 17/18 (94%)		Proscovia 24/24 (100%); Cholock 12/13 (92%); Nanyonga 5/6 (83%)	Liverpool Arena; Umpires: L. Douglas (New Zealand); M. Henning (Australia); Reserve umpire: E. Van den Berg (South Africa)

==== 7th place ====
21 July; 09:00 (BST)	Report; Stats	Zimbabwe	47–58	Uganda	Liverpool Arena; Umpires: L. Douglas (New Zealand); H. George (Australia); Reserve umpire: J. Yuliani (Singapore)
21 July; 09:00 (BST)	Report; Stats	Scoring by quarter: 11–14, 9–15, 17–16, 10–13			Liverpool Arena; Umpires: L. Douglas (New Zealand); H. George (Australia); Reserve umpire: J. Yuliani (Singapore)
21 July; 09:00 (BST)	Report; Stats	Takaidza 30/36 (83%); Bwanali 9/10 (90%); Jani 7/8 (88%); Ndlovu 1/1 (100%)		Cholock 15/18 (83%); Oyella 16/17 (94%); Proscovia 27/33 (82%)	Liverpool Arena; Umpires: L. Douglas (New Zealand); H. George (Australia); Reserve umpire: J. Yuliani (Singapore)

==== 5th place ====
21 July; 11:00 (BST)	Report; Stats	Jamaica	68–50	Malawi	Liverpool Arena; Umpires: J. Bowring (Australia); M. Henning (Australia); Reserve umpire: A. Armstrong-Lush (New Zealand)
21 July; 11:00 (BST)	Report; Stats	Scoring by quarter: 20–13, 17–15, 15–13, 16–9			Liverpool Arena; Umpires: J. Bowring (Australia); M. Henning (Australia); Reserve umpire: A. Armstrong-Lush (New Zealand)
21 July; 11:00 (BST)	Report; Stats	Fowler 53/54 (98%); Beckford 4/6 (67%); Aiken 8/12 (67%); Robinson 3/5 (60%)		Mvula 23/29 (79%); Chimaliro 25/33 (76%); Simtowe 2/2 (100%)	Liverpool Arena; Umpires: J. Bowring (Australia); M. Henning (Australia); Reserve umpire: A. Armstrong-Lush (New Zealand)

== Semi-finals and medal matches ==
At the conclusion of qualifying pool play Australia, England, South Africa and New Zealand advanced into the semi-finals. It was the first time South Africa had made it to the semi-finals since 1995 when it played in the final after winning its second round group, while Jamaica missed out for the first time since 1995. During pool play Australia had edged New Zealand by one goal to top Group F and England easily beat South Africa to take out Group G. That meant Australia would face South Africa in one semi-final, with England squaring off against New Zealand in the other.

England were favourites in their semi final, being the commonwealth games champions and having gone undefeated for two years against New Zealand. However, New Zealand started stronger, scoring the opening five goals. England came back to take a 24–21 lead at half time. Heading into the final quarter New Zealand were ahead by three goals and managed to hold on for a 47–45 victory.

Australia started with a second string side against South Africa in the other semi, resting their captain and leaving some of their stars on the bench. At half time they led 31–23. South Africa fought back to out score Australia in the third quarter and close the gap to just four goals. They continued to push Australia through the last quarter and in the end it required some great defense to close out the game. Australia ended victors with a 55–53 scoreline.

The final between Australia and New Zealand was a tense and thrilling match. The opening quarter went back and forth finishing with both teams tied on 10 goals. The second quarter continued in this vein with both teams going tit for tat scoring goals. In the final minute of the quarter New Zealand got on a roll scoring three consecutive times to take a 25–28 lead into the half. They carried this momentum early into the third quarter to extend the lead to seven goals, before Australia fought back to close it to a four-goal advantage by the quarters end. The score leading into the final quarter was 37–41 to New Zealand. Australia pushed hard in the final quarter of the match, but were unable to take the lead. They got within one goal in the final minute, but New Zealand were then able to hold on to possession to close out the match. The final score was 51–52.

Semifinals
20 July
Australia	55
South Africa	53
20 July
England	45
New Zealand	47

Final
21 July
Australia	51
New Zealand	52
Bronze Medal Match
21 July
South Africa	42
England	58

=== Semi-finals ===
20 July; 11:00 (BST)	Report; Stats	Australia	55–53	South Africa	Liverpool Arena; Umpires: G. Folwer (New Zealand); G. Burgess (England); Reserve umpire: L. Douglas (New Zealand)
20 July; 11:00 (BST)	Report; Stats	Scoring by quarter: 14–10, 17–13, 12–16, 12–14			Liverpool Arena; Umpires: G. Folwer (New Zealand); G. Burgess (England); Reserve umpire: L. Douglas (New Zealand)
20 July; 11:00 (BST)	Report; Stats	Thwaites 30/30 (100%); Tippett 23/23 (100%); Wood 2/3 (67%)		Potgieter 39/41 (95%); Holtzhausen 14/16 (88%)	Liverpool Arena; Umpires: G. Folwer (New Zealand); G. Burgess (England); Reserve umpire: L. Douglas (New Zealand)

20 July; 15:00 (BST)	Report; Stats	England	45–47	New Zealand	Liverpool Arena; Umpires: M. Phippard (Australia); J. Bowring (Australia); Reserve umpire: M. Henning (Australia)
20 July; 15:00 (BST)	Report; Stats	Scoring by quarter: 9–12, 15–9, 9–15, 12–11			Liverpool Arena; Umpires: M. Phippard (Australia); J. Bowring (Australia); Reserve umpire: M. Henning (Australia)
20 July; 15:00 (BST)	Report; Stats	Housby 24/27 (89%); Harten 21/25 (84%)		Folau 22/26 (85%); Ekenasio 25/26 (96%)	Liverpool Arena; Umpires: M. Phippard (Australia); J. Bowring (Australia); Reserve umpire: M. Henning (Australia)

=== Bronze medal match ===
21 July; 14:30 (BST)	Report; Stats	England	58–42	South Africa	Liverpool Arena; Umpires: M. Phippard (Australia); G. Fowler (New Zealand); Reserve umpire: J. Bowring (Australia)
21 July; 14:30 (BST)	Report; Stats	Scoring by quarter: 14–12, 15–10, 17–10, 12–10			Liverpool Arena; Umpires: M. Phippard (Australia); G. Fowler (New Zealand); Reserve umpire: J. Bowring (Australia)
21 July; 14:30 (BST)	Report; Stats	Harten 29/34 (85%); Housby 29/29 (100%); Dunn 0/1 (0%)		Holtzhausen 12/20 (60%); Potgieter 28/32 (88%); S. Burger 2/2 (100%)	Liverpool Arena; Umpires: M. Phippard (Australia); G. Fowler (New Zealand); Reserve umpire: J. Bowring (Australia)

=== Gold and silver medals match ===
21 July; 17:00 (BST)	Report; Stats	Australia	51–52	New Zealand	Liverpool Arena; Umpires: K. Stephenson (England); G. Burgess (England); Reserve umpire: L. Travis (England)
21 July; 17:00 (BST)	Report; Stats	Scoring by quarter: 10–10, 15–18, 12–13, 14–11			Liverpool Arena; Umpires: K. Stephenson (England); G. Burgess (England); Reserve umpire: L. Travis (England)
21 July; 17:00 (BST)	Report; Stats	Bassett 35/40 (88%); Tippett 11/11 (100%); Wood 5/6 (83%)		Folau 28/35 (80%); Ekenasio 24/26 (92%)	Liverpool Arena; Umpires: K. Stephenson (England); G. Burgess (England); Reserve umpire: L. Travis (England)

== Tournament top scorers ==
Player	Team	Goals
Tharjini Sivalingam	Sri Lanka	348
Jhaniele Fowler	Jamaica	304
Lenize Potgieter	South Africa	271
Joanne Harten	England	216
Joyce Mvula	Malawi	216
Maria Folau	New Zealand	212
Samantha Wallace	Trinidad and Tobago	210
Caitlin Bassett	Australia	204
Joice Takaidza	Zimbabwe	198
Proscovia Peace	Uganda	170

- Updated – 22 July 2019

== Final placings ==
Place	Country
Gold	New Zealand
Silver	Australia
Bronze	England
4	South Africa
5	Jamaica
6	Malawi
7	Uganda
8	Zimbabwe
9	Trinidad and Tobago
10	Northern Ireland
11	Scotland
12	Barbados
13	Samoa
14	Fiji
15	Sri Lanka
16	Singapore

=== Medallists ===
Gold	Silver	Bronze
New Zealand; Coach: Noeline Taurua	Australia; Coach: Lisa Alexander	England; Coach: Tracey Neville
Maria Folau; Laura Langman (c); Ameliaranne Ekenasio; Gina Crampton; Bailey Mes; Casey Kopua; Jane Watson; Shannon Saunders; Karin Burger; Phoenix Karaka; Katrina Rore; Te Paea Selby-Rickit	Caitlin Bassett (c); April Brandley; Kelsey Browne; Courtney Bruce; Paige Hadley; Sarah Klau; Jamie-Lee Price; Caitlin Thwaites; Gretel Tippett; Elizabeth Watson (vc); Jo Weston; Stephanie Wood	Helen Housby; Joanne Harten; Natalie Haythornthwaite; Rachel Dunn; Serena Guthrie (c); Jade Clarke (vc); Chelsea Pitman; Natalie Panagarry; Layla Guscoth; Eboni Usoro-Brown; Geva Mentor; Francesca Williams
