= Kalifa McCollin =

Trinidad and Tobago netball player (born 1995)

Personal information
- Born: 18 July 1995 (age 31) Trinidad and Tobago
- Height: 1.80 m (5 ft 11 in)

Netball career
- Playing positions: GA, GS
Years	Club team	Apps
2016–2017; 2019	Celtic Dragons	
2018	Mavericks	
2020	Southern Steel	
2021–present	Collingwood Magpies	
Years	National team	Caps
2015–present	Trinidad and Tobago	

Kalifa McCollin (born 18 July 1995) is a netball player from Trinidad and Tobago, who plays for the Collingwood Magpies in the Suncorp Super Netball league.

== Career ==
McCollin's netball career commenced from a young age. Born in Trinidad and Tobago to sports-coaching parents, she was selected to play for the under-16 international team at the age of 12, and rose up the international ranks to make her senior debut for the national team in 2015, at the age of 17. She has represented Trinidad and Tobago at the 2015 and 2019 Netball World Cups.

In club netball, McCollin's ability led to her moving to the United Kingdom, where she played for the Celtic Dragons and Mavericks between 2016 and 2019, and became one of the Netball Superleague's most reliable attackers. In 2020 she moved to New Zealand to play in the ANZ Premiership for the Southern Steel, and in 2021 she was signed by Australian Super Netball team the Collingwood Magpies.
