= Samantha Wallace (netball) =

Trinidad and Tobago netball player

Samantha Wallace-Joseph
Personal information
- Born: 16 January 1994 (age 32)
- Height: 1.93 m (6 ft 4 in)

Netball career
- Playing position: GS
Years	Club team	Apps
2016	Hertfordshire Mavericks	
2017-2024	New South Wales Swifts	
2025-present	Loughborough Lightning	
Years	National team	Caps
2015-present	Trinidad and Tobago	

Samantha Monique Wallace-Joseph (born 16 January 1994) is an international netball who plays Loughborough Lightning in the Netball Super League and the Trinidad and Tobago national netball team. She previously played for the New South Wales Swifts in the Suncorp Super Netball league.

== Club career ==
=== Hertfordshire Mavericks ===
Wallace-Joseph joined Hertfordshire Mavericks in the English Netball Super League ahead of the 2016 season.

=== New South Wales Swifts ===
Wallace-Joseph moved to Australia to play for the New South Wales Swifts at the start of the 2017 season. She was the first player from Trinidad and Tobago to play in Australia's Super Netball. Wallace-Joseph played GS for the duration of her time at the Swifts. In 2019 and 2021 she was part of the Swifts premiership winning teams and was awarded the MVP Award for her performance in the 2019 Super Netball Grand Final. After 7 years with the club Wallace-Joseph left the Swifts by mutual agreement over concerns about her behaviour “within the team environment”. Earlier in the season she was invesigated by the governing body for posting anti-trans sentiment on instagram. She later apologised for her comments.

=== Loughborough Lightning ===
Wallace-Joseph made her return to the Netball Super League, signing for Loughborough Lightning ahead of the 2025 season. Lightning reached the 2025 grand final where they lost to London Pulse.

== International career ==
Wallace has represented the Trinidad and Tobago national netball team at the 2015 and 2019 Netball World Cups.

During the 2021 season she was said to be the fifth best Netball player tying with Towera Vinkhumbo of Malawi in a poll by Netball Scoop.

== Honours ==
=== New South Wales Swifts ===
==== Super Netball ====
- Winners: 2019, 2021
- Runners Up: 2023

=== Loughborough Lightning ===
==== Netball Super League ====
- Runners Up: 2025
