= 2017 Netball Europe Open Championships =

International netball tournament

Tournament details
- Host country: Wales
- City: Cardiff
- Venue: Sport Wales National Centre
- Dates: 5-8 October 2017
- Teams: 5
- TV partner(s): BBC Sport; YouTube

Final positions
- Champions: England
- Runners-up: Northern Ireland
- Third place: Scotland

Tournament statistics
- Matches played: 10

The 2017 Netball Europe Open Championships was a tournament organised by Netball Europe. It featured five teams playing a series of netball test matches in October 2017 at Cardiff's Sport Wales National Centre. The hosts Wales were joined by England, Northern Ireland and Scotland and guest team Fiji. With a team captained by Sasha Corbin and coached by Tracey Neville, England retained the title after winning all four of their matches. Northern Ireland's Lisa Bowman was named the Player of the Tournament. The series was streamed live on BBC Sport and on Netball Europe's YouTube channel.

== Squads ==
Participating teams and rosters
England	Fiji	Northern Ireland	Scotland	Wales
Summer Artman; Eleanor Cardwell; Sasha Corbin (c); Sophie Drakeford-Lewis; George Fisher; Jodie Gibson; Natalie Haythornthwaite (vc); Josie Huckle; Leah Kennedy; Gabby Marshall; Vicki Oyesola; Natalie Panagarry (vc)	Adi Bolakoro; Nina Cirikisuva; Raijeli Daveua; Episake Kahatoka; Jacinta Lal; Maria Lutua; Kelera Nawai; Alisi Nawele; Afa Rusivakula; Maliana Rusivakula; Maria Rusivakula; Verenaisi Sawana; Talei Waqainabete; Vaiti Waqatabu (c)	Kyla Bowman; Lisa Bowman; Niamh Cooper; Michelle Drayne; Gemma Gibney; Noleen Lennon; Michelle Magee; Oonagh McCullough; Sarah Montgomery; Caroline O'Hanlon (c); Fionnuala Toner; Neamh Woods	Kelly Boyle; Claire Brownie (c); Lynsey Gallagher; Ella Gibbons; Bethan Goodwin; Niamh McCall; Nicola McCleery; Sarah MacPhail; Hayley Mulheron; Samantha Murphy; Emily Nicholl; Jo Pettitt	Fern Davies; Suzy Drane (c); Bethan Dyke; Chelsea Lewis; Sarah Llewellyn; Clare Jones; Kyra Jones; Nia Jones; Kelly Morgan (vc); Cara Lea Moseley; Eleanor Roberts; Georgia Rowe; Christina Shaw; Leila Thomas; Amanda Varey
Head Coach: Tracey Neville	Head Coach: Vicki Wilson	Head Coach: Elaine Rice	Head Coach: Gail Parata	Head Coach: Trish Wilcox

== Debuts ==
- Six players made their senior debuts for England during the series. On 6 October, Vicki Oyesola and Josie Huckle started against Scotland. In the same match Gabby Marshall and George Fisher came on at half-time. Later on the same day, Summer Artman started against Northern Ireland. On 7 October, Sophie Drakeford-Lewis made her debut against Fiji.
- On 5 October, Christina Shaw made her senior debut for Wales against Northern Ireland.
- On 7 October, Leila Thomas made her senior debut for Wales against Scotland.

== Matches ==
=== Day 1 ===
Thursday, 5 October	Scotland	52–34	Fiji
16:30 (BST)

Thursday, 5 October	Wales	46–47	Northern Ireland
18:30 (BST)		Report

=== Day 2 ===
Friday, 6 October	England	61–48	Scotland
12:00 (BST)		Report

Friday, 6 October	Wales	61–40	Fiji
18:00 (BST)		Report

Friday, 6 October	England	75-44	Northern Ireland
20:00 (BST)		Report

=== Day 3 ===
Saturday, 7 October	Northern Ireland	58–46	Fiji
10:30 (BST)

Saturday, 7 October	Wales	49–58	Scotland
16:00 (BST)		Report

Saturday, 7 October	England	94-31	Fiji
18:00 (BST)		Report

=== Day 4 ===
Sunday, 8 October	Northern Ireland	46–45	Scotland
10:00 (BST)

Sunday, 8 October	Wales	50–72	England
12:00 (BST)		Report

== Final table ==
Pos	Team	P	W	D	L	GF	GA	GD	Pts
1	England	4	4	0	0	302	173	+129	8
2	Northern Ireland	4	3	0	1	195	212	-17	6
3	Scotland	4	2	0	2	203	190	+13	4
4	Wales	4	1	0	3	206	217	-11	2
5	Fiji	4	0	0	4	151	265	-114	0
