= Netball at the 2018 Commonwealth Games squads =

This article shows the rosters of all participating teams at the netball tournament at the 2018 Commonwealth Games on the Gold Coast, Australia.

== Pool A ==
=== Australia ===
The following is the Australia roster in the netball tournament of the 2018 Commonwealth Games.

Australia national netball team – 2018 Commonwealth Games roster
Players
Coaches

Pos.	Name	Age - DOB	Ht.	Club	Club nat.
GS	Bassett, Caitlin (C)	29 - 23 May 1988	1.94 m (6 ft 4 in)	Sunshine Coast Lightning	(Australia)
GD, GK, WD	Brandley, April	27 - 19 April 1990	1.85 m (6 ft 1 in)	Collingwood Magpies Netball	(Australia)
GD, GA	Bruce, Courtney	24 - 8 December 1993	1.90 m (6 ft 3 in)	West Coast Fever	(Australia)
GK, GD	Geitz, Laura	30 - 4 November 1987	1.85 m (6 ft 1 in)	Queensland Firebirds	(Australia)
GA, GS, WA	Pettitt, Susan	34 - 23 March 1984	1.80 m (5 ft 11 in)	Giants Netball	(Australia)
C, WA, WD	Ravaillion, Kim	24 - 26 July 1993	1.76 m (5 ft 9 in)	Collingwood Magpies Netball	(Australia)
WA, C	Robinson, Madison	30 - 5 January 1988	1.68 m (5 ft 6 in)	Collingwood Magpies Netball	(Australia)
WD, GD, C	Simpson, Gabi	25 - 17 October 1992	1.76 m (5 ft 9 in)	Queensland Firebirds	(Australia)
GS, GA	Thwaites, Caitlin	31 - 29 December 1986	1.88 m (6 ft 2 in)	Collingwood Magpies Netball	(Australia)
C, WA	Watson, Elizabeth	24 - 30 March 1994	1.76 m (5 ft 9 in)	Melbourne Vixens	(Australia)
GD, GK, WD	Weston, Joanna	24 - 14 February 1994	1.87 m (6 ft 2 in)	Melbourne Vixens	(Australia)
GA, WA, GS	Wood, Stephanie	26 - 28 November 1991	1.76 m (5 ft 9 in)	Sunshine Coast Lightning	(Australia)

Head coach

Lisa Alexander

Assistant coach(es)

Margaret Caldow
Roselee Jencke

Team manager

Julie Richardson

Legend

- (C) Team captain
- Club field describes current pro club
- Injured

=== Barbados ===
The following is the Barbados roster in the netball tournament of the 2018 Commonwealth Games.

Barbados national netball team – 2018 Commonwealth Games roster
Players
Coaches

Pos.	Name	Age - DOB	Ht.	Club	Club nat.
	Azore-Bruce, Shonette	-	–	St Barnabas	(Barbados)
	Bobb, Vanessa	-	–	St Barnabas	(Barbados)
	Blackman, Latonia	-	–	Brittons Hill	(Barbados)
	Croney, Damisha	-	–	UWI Blackbirds	(Barbados)
	Holder, Rieah	-	–	UWI Blackbirds	(Barbados)
	Howell, Teresa	-	–	UWI Blackbirds	(Barbados)
	Niles-Mapp, Rhe-Ann (C)	-	–	Rangers	(Barbados)
	Payne, Nikita	-	–	Rangers	(Barbados)
	Rock-Yaw, Tonisha	-	–	Rangers	(Barbados)
	Seale, Shonte	-	–	St Barnabas	(Barbados)
	Smith, Sabreena	-	–	Brittons Hill	(Barbados)
	Wharton, Shonica	-	–	UWI Blackbirds	(Barbados)

Head coach

Sandra Bruce-Small

Legend

- (C) Team captain
- Club field describes current pro club
- Injured

=== Fiji ===
The following is the Australia roster in the netball tournament of the 2018 Commonwealth Games.

Fiji national netball team – 2006 Commonwealth Games roster
Players
Coaches

Pos.	Name	Age - DOB	Ht.	Club	Club nat.
	Cirikisuva, Nina	-	–		(Fiji)
	Galo, Aliso	-	–		(Fiji)
	Naqiri, Alisi	-	–		(Fiji)
	Paul, Alesi	-	–		(Fiji)
	Rusivakula, Maliana	-	–		(Fiji)
	Rusivakula, Unouna	-	–		(Fiji)
	Rokoura, Lusiani (C)	-	–		(Fiji)
	Sawana, Verenaisi	-	–		(Fiji)
	Waqa, Laisani	-	–		(Fiji)
	Waqanidrola, Merelita	-	–		(Fiji)
	Waqainabete, Alanieta	-	–		(Fiji)
	Kahatoka, Episake	-	–		(Fiji)

Head coach

Vicki Wilson

Legend

- (C) Team captain
- Club field describes current pro club
- Injured

=== Jamaica ===
The following is the Jamaica roster in the netball tournament of the 2018 Commonwealth Games.

Jamaica national netball team – 2018 Commonwealth Games roster
Players
Coaches

Pos.	Name	Age - DOB	Ht.	Club	Club nat.
GS, GK	Aiken, Romelda	29 - 19 November 1988	1.95 m (6 ft 5 in)	Queensland Firebirds	(Australia)
GS, GA	Beckford, Shanice	22 - 16 April 1995	1.70 m (5 ft 7 in)	Kingston Hummingbirds	(Jamaica)
C, WA	Dixon, Nicole	23 - 3 February 1995	1.65 m (5 ft 5 in)	Manchester Spurs	(Jamaica)
GD, GK	Facey, Stacian	24 - 9 August 1993	1.80 m (5 ft 11 in)	St Ann Orchids	(Jamaica)
GS	Fowler-Reid, Jhaniele (C)	28 - 21 July 1989	1.96 m (6 ft 5 in)	West Coast Fever	(Australia)
GS, GA	Robinson, Rebekah	23 - 23 January 1995	1.78 m (5 ft 10 in)	St Ann Orchids	(Jamaica)
GK, GD	Sterling, Shamera	22 - 21 October 1995	1.85 m (6 ft 1 in)	Loughborough Lightning	(England)
C, WA, WD	Thomas, Adean	23 - 31 July 1994	1.73 m (5 ft 8 in)	St Ann Orchids	(Jamaica)
C, WD	Thompson, Paula	33 - 17 November 1984	1.78 m (5 ft 10 in)	Kingston Hummingbirds	(Jamaica)
GD, WD	Ward, Jodi-Ann	23 - 1 September 1994	1.77 m (5 ft 10 in)	St Catherine Racers	(Jamaica)
C, WA	Williams, Khadijah	23 - 29 December 1994	1.65 m (5 ft 5 in)	Manchester Spurs	(Jamaica)
WD, GK, GD	Williams, Vangelee	25 - 26 May 1992	1.75 m (5 ft 9 in)	St Ann Orchids	(Jamaica)

Head coach

Marvette Anderson and Sasher-Gay Henry

Team manager

Leonie Phinn

Legend

- (C) Team captain
- Club field describes current pro club
- Injured

=== Northern Ireland ===
Northern Ireland – 2018 Commonwealth Games roster
Players
Coaches

Name	Pos	DOB	Height	Club	Nat	Caps
Kyla Bowman	GS, GA	April 19, 1990 (aged 27)	1.80 m (5 ft 11 in)	Larkfield	(Northern Ireland)
Lisa Bowman	GS	November 2, 1988 (aged 29)	1.88 m (6 ft 2 in)	Team Northumbria	(England)
Niamh Cooper	WD	July 29, 1992 (aged 25)	1.74 m (5 ft 9 in)	Kingsway	(Northern Ireland)
Michelle Drayne	WD, C, WA	September 22, 1988 (aged 29)	1.67 m (5 ft 6 in)	Hertfordshire Mavericks	(England)
Gemma Lawlor	GK, GD	April 30, 1987 (aged 30)	1.79 m (5 ft 10 in)	Belfast Ladies	(Northern Ireland)
Noleen Lennon	GS, GK	March 22, 1984 (aged 34)	1.86 m (6 ft 1 in)	Belfast Ladies	(Northern Ireland)
Michelle Magee	WD, GD	January 13, 2000 (aged 18)	1.80 m (5 ft 11 in)	Kingsway	(Northern Ireland)
Lisa McCaffrey	WA, C	September 21, 1986 (aged 31)	1.69 m (5 ft 7 in)	Belfast Ladies	(Northern Ireland)
Oonagh McCullough	GA, GS	January 6, 1987 (aged 31)	1.76 m (5 ft 9 in)	Belfast Ladies	(Northern Ireland)
Caroline O'Hanlon (c)	C, WA	August 8, 1984 (aged 33)	1.74 m (5 ft 9 in)	Manchester Thunder	(England)
Fionnuala Toner	WD	March 6, 1990 (aged 28)	1.76 m (5 ft 9 in)	Belfast Ladies	(Northern Ireland)
Neamh Woods	WA, C, WD	May 3, 1989 (aged 28)	1.70 m (5 ft 7 in)	Larkfield	(Northern Ireland)

Head coach

- Elaine Rice

Assistant coach

- Clar-Rois McGuinness

Manager: Karen Rollo

Notes

- (c) – Captain
- (cc) – Co-captain
- (vc) – Vice-captain
- – Injury / maternity leave
- (TRP) – Temporary Replacement Player
Player profiles: Team website
Last updated: 5 January 2020

=== South Africa ===
The following is the South Africa roster in the netball tournament of the 2018 Commonwealth Games.

South Africa national netball team – 2018 Commonwealth Games roster
Players
Coaches

Pos.	Name	Age - DOB	Ht.	Club	Club nat.
	Burger, Erin	-	–		(South Africa)
	Burger, Sigrid	-	–	Surrey Storm	(England)
	Griesel, Izette	-	–	Gauteng Jaguars	(South Africa)
	Holtzhausen, Maryka	-	–	Severn Stars	(England)
	Maweni, Phumza	-	–	Severn Stars	(England)
	Msomi, Bongiwe (C)	-	–	Adelaide Thunderbirds	(Australia)
	Mthembu, Precious	-	–	Kingdom Stars	(South Africa)
	Pretorius, Karla	-	–	Sunshine Coast Lightning	(Australia)
	Stoltz, Renske	-	–	Wasps Netball	(England)
	van der Merwe, Shadine	-	–	Gauteng Jaguars	(South Africa)
	Venter, Ine-Mari	-	–	Gauteng Jaguars	(South Africa)
	Vimbela, Zanele	-	–	Team Bath	(South Africa)

Head coach

Norma Plummer

Legend

- (C) Team captain
- Club field describes current pro club
- Injured

== Pool B ==
=== England ===
The following is the England roster in the netball tournament of the 2018 Commonwealth Games.

England national netball team – 2018 Commonwealth Games roster
Players
Coaches

Pos.	Name	Age - DOB	Ht.	Club	Club nat.
GD, GK, WD	Ama Agbeze (C)	35 - 12 November 1982	1.84 m (6 ft 0 in)	Adelaide Thunderbirds	(Australia)
GK, GD	Eboni Beckford-Chambers	30 - 4 February 1988	1.85 m (6 ft 1 in)	Team Bath	(England)
C, WD, WA	Jade Clarke	34 - 17 October 1983	1.74 m (5 ft 9 in)	Wasps Netball	(England)
C, WD	Beth Cobden	25 - 3 February 1993	1.77 m (5 ft 10 in)	Loughborough Lightning	(England)
GS, GA	Kadeen Corbin	26 - 27 November 1991	1.77 m (5 ft 10 in)	Mainland Tactix	(New Zealand)
GD, WD	Jodie Gibson	25 - 30 October 1992	1.78 m (5 ft 10 in)	Severn Stars	(England)
C, WD	Serena Guthrie	28 - 5 January 1990	1.77 m (5 ft 10 in)	Giants Netball	(Australia)
GS, GA	Joanne Harten	29 - 21 March 1989	1.88 m (6 ft 2 in)	Giants Netball	(Australia)
WA, GA	Natalie Haythornthwaite	25 - 9 December 1992	1.74 m (5 ft 9 in)	Wasps Netball	(England)
GS, GA	Helen Housby	23 - 19 January 1995	1.84 m (6 ft 0 in)	New South Wales Swifts	(Australia)
GK, GD	Geva Mentor	33 - 17 September 1984	1.91 m (6 ft 3 in)	Sunshine Coast Lightning	(Australia)
WA	Chelsea Pitman	29 - 8 June 1988	1.81 m (5 ft 11 in)	Adelaide Thunderbirds	(Australia)

Head coach

Tracey Neville

Legend

- (C) Team captain
- Club field describes current pro club
- Injured

=== Malawi ===
The following is the Malawi roster in the netball tournament of the 2018 Commonwealth Games.

Malawi national netball team – 2018 Commonwealth Games roster
Players
Coaches

Pos.	Name	Age - DOB	Ht.	Club	Club nat.
	Chimaliro, Jane	-	–	Civonets	(Malawi)
	Dambo, Martha	-	–	Thunder Queens	(Malawi)
	Galleta, Thandie	-	–	Thunder Queens	(Malawi)
	Kachilika, Joanna (C)	-	–	Thunder Queens	(Malawi)
	Kumwenda, Bridget	-	–	Kukoma Diamonds	(Malawi)
	Kumwenda, Mwai	-	–	Melbourne Vixens	(Australia)
	Lwazi, Takondwa	-	–	Blue Eagles Sisters	(Malawi)
	Mtukule, Caroline	-	–	Kukoma Diamonds	(Malawi)
	Mvula, Joyce	-	–	Manchester Thunder	(England)
	Ngwira, Loreen	-	–	Team Northumbria	(England)
	Simtowe, Sindi	-	–	Tigresses	(Malawi)
	Vinkhumbo, Towera	-	–	Kukoma Diamonds	(Malawi)

Head coach

Whyte Mulilima

Legend

- (C) Team captain
- Club field describes current pro club
- Injured

=== New Zealand ===
The following is the New Zealand roster in the netball tournament of the 2018 Commonwealth Games.

New Zealand national netball team – 2018 Commonwealth Games roster
Players
Coaches

Pos.	Name	Age - DOB	Ht.	Club	Club nat.
	Ekenasio, Ameliaranne	-	–	Central Pulse	(New Zealand)
	Fakahokotau, Temalisi	-	–	Mainland Tactix	(New Zealand)
	Folau, Maria	-	–	Northern Mystics	(New Zealand)
	Francois, Shannon	-	–	Southern Steel	(New Zealand)
	Grant, Katrina (C)	-	–	Central Pulse	(New Zealand)
	Jury, Kelly	-	–	Waikato Bay of Plenty Magic	(New Zealand)
	Kara, Grace	-	–	Northern Stars	(New Zealand)
	Kersten, Claire	-	–	Central Pulse	(New Zealand)
	Mes, Bailey	-	–	Northern Mystics	(New Zealand)
	Selby-Rickit, Te Paea	-	–	Southern Steel	(New Zealand)
	Sinclair, Samantha	-	–	Waikato Bay of Plenty Magic	(New Zealand)
	Sokolich-Beatson, Michaela	-	–	Northern Mystics	(New Zealand)

Head coach

Janine Southby

Legend

- (C) Team captain
- Club field describes current pro club
- Injured

=== Scotland ===
The following was the Scotland roster at the netball tournament of the 2018 Commonwealth Games.

Scotland – 2018 Commonwealth Games roster
Players
Coaches

Name	Pos	DOB	Height	Club	Nat	Caps
Claire Brownie (c)	C, WD	10 August 1988 (aged 29)	1.75 m (5 ft 9 in)	UWS Sirens	(Scotland)
Fiona Fowler	GD, GK	18 April 1990 (aged 27)	1.85 m (6 ft 1 in)	Adelaide Thunderbirds	(Australia)
Lynsey Gallagher	GS, GA, WA	20 May 1992 (aged 25)	1.75 m (5 ft 9 in)	UWS Sirens	(Scotland)
Ella Gibbons	GD, GK	24 November 1994 (aged 23)	1.91 m (6 ft 3 in)	UWS Sirens	(Scotland)
Bethan Goodwin	GS, GA	4 July 1999 (aged 18)	1.85 m (6 ft 1 in)	UWS Sirens	(Scotland)
Niamh McCall	GA, WA	28 April 2000 (aged 17)	1.78 m (5 ft 10 in)	East Kilbride	(Scotland)
Nicola McCleery	WA, C	12 October 1995 (aged 22)	1.68 m (5 ft 6 in)	UWS Sirens	(Scotland)
Hayley Mulheron	GK, GD	27 April 1986 (aged 31)	1.85 m (6 ft 1 in)	Team Northumbria	(England)
Samantha Murphy	C, WA, WD	29 July 1991 (aged 26)	1.67 m (5 ft 6 in)	UWS Sirens	(Scotland)
Emily Nicholl	GD, WD	24 May 1994 (aged 23)	1.80 m (5 ft 11 in)	UWS Sirens	(Scotland)
Joanne Pettitt	GS, GA	21 May 1995 (aged 22)	1.83 m (6 ft 0 in)	UWS Sirens	(Scotland)
Bethany Sutherland	WD, GD	22 April 1997 (aged 20)	1.80 m (5 ft 11 in)	UWS Sirens	(Scotland)

Head coach

Gail Parata

Legend

- (C) Team captain
- Club field describes current pro club
- Injured

=== Uganda ===
The following is the Uganda roster in the netball tournament of the 2018 Commonwealth Games.

Uganda national netball team – 2018 Commonwealth Games roster
Players
Coaches

Pos.	Name	Age - DOB	Ht.	Club	Club nat.
	Ajio, Lilian	-	–	Prisons	(Uganda)
	Kizza, Betty	-	–	NIC	(Uganda)
	Meme, Ruth	-	–		(Uganda)
	Nakabuye, Hadijah	-	–	Prisons	(Uganda)
	Nakachwa, Halima	-	–	Prisons	(Uganda)
	Nampungu, Joan	-	–	NIC	(Uganda)
	Namuwaya, Muhayimina	-	–		(Uganda)
	Nanyonga, Florence	-	–	Prisons	(Uganda)
	Nanyonga, Racheal	-	–	NIC	(Uganda)
	Nanfuka, Stella	-	–	Prisons	(Uganda)
	Oyella, Stella	-	–	Prisons	(Uganda)
	Proscovia, Peace (C)	-	–	Loughborough Lightning	(England)

Head coach

Imelda Nyongesa
Rashid Mubiru

Legend

- (C) Team captain
- Club field describes current pro club
- Injured

=== Wales ===
The following is the Wales roster in the netball tournament of the 2018 Commonwealth Games. It was announced on 1 March 2018.

Wales national netball team – 2018 Commonwealth Games roster
Players
Coaches

Pos.	Name	Age - DOB	Ht.	Club	Club nat.
	Davies, Fern	-	–	Celtic Dragons	(Wales)
	Drane, Suzy (C)	-	–	Celtic Dragons	(Wales)
	Dyke, Bethan	-	–	Celtic Dragons	(Wales)
	Jones, Kyra	-	–	Celtic Dragons	(Wales)
	Jones, Nia	-	–	Celtic Dragons	(Wales)
	Lewis, Chelsea	-	–	Team Bath	(England)
	Llewelyn, Sarah	-	–	Celtic Dragons	(Wales)
	Morgan, Kelly	-	–	Celtic Dragons	(Wales)
	Moseley, Cara Lea	-	–	Celtic Dragons	(Wales)
	Rowe, Georgia	-	–	Celtic Dragons	(Wales)
	Thomas, Leila	-	–	Celtic Dragons	(Wales)
	Varey, Amanda	-	–	Celtic Dragons	(Wales)

Head coach

Julie Hoornweg

Legend

- (C) Team captain
- Club field describes current pro club
- Injured
