= 2019 Netball World Cup Regional Qualifier – Europe =

2019 Netball World Cup qualifier

Tournament details
- Host country: Scotland
- City: Perth
- Venue: Perth College UHI
- Dates: 19–21 January 2018
- Teams: 3
- TV partner(s): BBC Sport; YouTube

Final positions
- Champions: Scotland (1st title)
- Runners-up: Northern Ireland
- Third place: Wales

Tournament statistics
- Matches played: 3

The 2019 Netball World Cup Regional Qualifier – Europe was a tournament organised by Netball Europe. It featured three teams playing a series of netball test matches in January 2018 at Perth College UHI. The hosts Scotland were joined by Northern Ireland and Wales. As well as being a 2019 Netball World Cup qualifier, the teams also played for World Netball Rankings points. England automatically qualified for the 2019 Netball World Cup as hosts. Scotland and Northern Ireland subsequently qualified for the main tournament with Wales missing out. The series was streamed live on BBC Sport and on Netball Europe's YouTube channel.

== Squads ==
Participating teams and rosters
Northern Ireland	Scotland	Wales
Kyla Bowman; Lisa Bowman; Niamh Cooper; Michelle Drayne; Gemma Lawlor; Noleen Lennon; Michelle Magee; Lisa McCaffrey; Oonagh McCullough; Caroline O'Hanlon (c); Fionnuala Toner; Neamh Woods	Claire Brownie (c); Lynsey Gallagher (vc); Ella Gibbons; Bethan Goodwin; Niamh McCall; Nicola McCleery; Hayley Mulheron; Samantha Murphy; Emily Nicholl; Jo Pettitt; Bethany Sutherland; Fiona Themann	Fern Davies; Suzy Drane (c); Bethan Dyke; Lateisha Kidner; Sarah Llewellyn; Clare Jones; Kyra Jones; Nia Jones; Kelly Morgan (vc); Cara Lea Moseley; Eleanor Roberts; Georgia Rowe
Head Coach: Elaine Rice	Head Coach: Gail Parata	Head Coach: Trish Wilcox

== Milestones ==
- On 20 January 2018, Kyra Jones made her 50th senior appearance for Wales in the match against Northern Ireland.

== Matches ==
Friday, 19 January 2018	Scotland	52–40	Wales
19:30 (GMT)

Saturday, 20 January 2018	Northern Ireland	57–42	Wales
15:00 (GMT)

Sunday, 21 January 2018	Scotland	52–31	Northern Ireland
12:00 (GMT)

== Final table ==
Pos	Team	P	W	D	L	GF	GA	GD	Pts
1	Scotland	2	2	0	0	104	71	+33	4
2	Northern Ireland	2	1	0	1	88	94	-6	2
3	Wales	2	0	0	2	82	109	-27	0

Qualified for the 2019 Netball World Cup
