= 2016 Netball Europe Open Championships =

International netball tournament

Tournament details
- Host country: England
- City: Newcastle upon Tyne
- Venue: Northumbria University's Sport Central
- Dates: 13–15 May 2016
- Teams: 4
- TV partner(s): QTV Sports; YouTube

Final positions
- Champions: England
- Runners-up: Wales
- Third place: Scotland

Tournament statistics
- Matches played: 6

The 2016 Netball Europe Open Championships was a tournament organised by Netball Europe. It featured four teams playing a series of netball test matches in May 2016 at Northumbria University's Sport Central. The hosts England were joined by Northern Ireland, Scotland and Wales. The second level tournament, the 2016 Netball Europe Open Challenge was played alongside the main event. With a team captained by Ama Agbeze and coached by Tracey Neville, England retained the title after winning all three of their matches. Wales finish as runners-up. Scotland's Bethan Goodwin was named Player of the Tournament. The tournament was livestreamed by QTV Sports and featured on Netball Europe's YouTube channel.

== Squads ==
Participating teams and rosters
England	Northern Ireland	Scotland	Wales
Ama Agbeze (c); Sophia Candappa; Eleanor Cardwell; Ella Clark; Samantha Cook; Kadeen Corbin; Jodie Gibson; Natalie Haythornthwaite; Helen Housby; Hannah Joseph; Leah Kennedy; Laura Malcolm (vc)	Jenna Bowman; Kyla Bowman; Niamh Cooper; Michelle Drayne; Gemma Gibney (c); Deborah McCarthy; Kirstie McCammon; Sarah Montgomery; Rachael Morton; Caroline O'Hanlon; Fionnuala Toner; Neamh Woods (vc)	Claire Brownie; Beverly Campbell; Lynsey Gallagher; Ella Gibbons; Bethan Goodwin; Rachel Johnstone; Nicola McCleery; Hayley MacKellar; Kate Meagh; Hayley Mulheron; Samantha Murphy; Emily Nicholl; Jo Pettitt; Bethany Sutherland; Lauren Tait	Sara Bell; Fern Davies; Suzy Drane (c); Bethan Dyke; Kyra Jones; Chelsea Lewis; Sarah Llewellyn; Kelly Morgan; Rebecca Oatley; Stephanie Perry; Georgia Rowe; Amanda Varey
Head Coach: Tracey Neville	Head Coach: Julie Kimber	Head Coach: Gail Parata	Head Coach: Trish Wilcox

== Debuts and milestones ==
- On 13 May 2016, Ella Clark, Eleanor Cardwell and Leah Kennedy all made their senior debuts for England in the match against Northern Ireland.
- Suzy Drane made her 75th senior appearance for Wales during the tournament.

== Matches ==
=== Round 1 ===
Friday, 13 May 2016	England	83–32	Northern Ireland
		Report

Friday, 13 May 2016	Wales	49–36	Scotland

=== Round 2 ===
Saturday, 14 May 2016	Northern Ireland	84–25	Wales

Saturday, 14 May 2016	England	70–26	Scotland

=== Round 3 ===
Sunday, 15 May 2016	Scotland	41–38	Northern Ireland

Sunday, 15 May 2016	England	81–42	Wales

== Final table ==
Pos	Team	P	W	D	L	GF	GA	GD	Pts
1	England	3	3	0	0	234	100	+134	6
2	Wales	3	2	0	1	145	155	-10	4
3	Scotland	3	1	0	2	103	157	-54	2
4	Northern Ireland	3	0	0	3	108	178	-70	0
