= Strathclyde Sirens =

Scottish netball team

- Full name: University of Strathclyde Sirens
- Founded: 2016
- Based in: Glasgow
- Regions: Scotland
- Home venue: Emirates Arena
- Head coach: Lesley MacDonald
- Co-captains: Bethany Dix, Emily Nicholl
- League: Netball Superleague
- Website: www.sirensnetball.com
Uniform

Strathclyde Sirens are a Scottish netball team based in Glasgow. Since 2017 their senior team has played in the Netball Superleague. Sirens also played in the 2018 Netball New Zealand Super Club tournament. They were originally known as the Scottish Sirens. In 2017 they became the UWS Sirens as a result of a sponsorship arrangement with the University of the West of Scotland. In 2018 they became the University of Strathclyde Sirens, usually shortened to Strathclyde Sirens, after forming a partnership with the University of Strathclyde. Sirens other main partners include Netball Scotland and the Scotland national netball team.

== History ==
=== Scottish Sirens ===
In June 2016 it was announced that Scottish Sirens, together with Severn Stars and Wasps Netball, would be one of three new franchises that would join the Netball Superleague for the 2017 season. Scottish Sirens were originally formed as a partnership between Netball Scotland and the University of the West of Scotland. On 21 February 2017, with a team coached by Gail Parata and including Claire Brownie, Caroline O'Hanlon and Carla Borrego, Sirens made their Superleague debut at the Emirates Arena in a 43–57 defeat against fellow newcomers Wasps.

=== UWS Sirens ===
In September 2017 it was announced that the University of the West of Scotland would sponsor Sirens for the 2018 season. As a result the team became known as UWS Sirens. As UWS Sirens, they also played in the 2018 Netball New Zealand Super Club tournament, finishing fifth overall.

=== Strathclyde Sirens ===
In October 2018, it was announced that Sirens would be renamed the University of Strathclyde Sirens after agreeing a partnership deal with the University of Strathclyde.

=== Scotland ===
Sirens work in partnership with both Netball Scotland and the Scotland national netball team. Gail Parata served as the joint head coach of both Sirens and Scotland. At the 2019 Netball World Cup, eleven of the Scotland squad were Sirens players.

== Home venue ==
Sirens play their home games at the Emirates Arena.

== Notable players ==
=== 2024 Squad ===
2024 Strathclyde Sirens roster
Players
Coaching staff

Nat.	Name	Position(s)	DoB	Height
(Malawi)	Towera Vinkhumbo	GD,GK	14 February 1991	1.75 m (5 ft 9 in)
(Scotland)	Iona Christian	WA, C	23 December 1997	1.65 m (5 ft 5 in)
(England)	Millie Sanders	GD, GK	8 August 2001	1.80 m (5 ft 11 in)
(Scotland)	Bethan Goodwin	GS, GA	4 July 1999	1.85 m (6 ft 1 in)
(Scotland)	Hannah Leighton	C,WD	1 August 1998	–
(Scotland)	Emily Nicholl	GD, GK	24 May 1994	1.80 m (5 ft 11 in)
(Scotland)	Emma Love	WA, C	26 July 1999	–
(England)	Hannah Williams	C, WA	26 February 2000	1.75 m (5 ft 9 in)
(Scotland)	Cerys Cairns	GS, GA	1 November 2002	1.80 m (5 ft 11 in)
(South Africa)	Sesandile Ngubane	GS, GA	19 April 2002	1.81 m (5 ft 11 in)
(Scotland)	Cerys Finn	GK, GD		–
(Scotland)	Zara Fleet	GA, GS		–

Head coach

- Lesley MacDonald

Notes

- (c) – Captain
- (cc) – Co-captain
- (vc) – Vice-captain
- – Injury / maternity leave
- (TRP) – Temporary Replacement Player
Player profiles: Team website
Last updated: 13 September 2023

=== Internationals ===
Scotland

- Emma Barrie
- Kelly Boyle
- Lynsey Gallagher
- Ella Gibbons
- Bethan Goodwin
- Sarah MacPhail
- Claire Maxwell
- Niamh McCall
- Nicola McCleery
- Hayley Mulheron
- Emily Nicholl
- Lauren Tait

England

- Sara Bayman
- Leah Kennedy

Jamaica

- Nicole Aiken-Pinnock
- Carla Borrego

New Zealand

- Cathrine Latu
- Ellen Halpenny

Northern Ireland

- Caroline O'Hanlon

South Africa

- Zanele Vimbela

Samoa

- Cathrine Latu

== Head coaches ==
Coach	Years
(New Zealand) Gail Parata	2016–2017, 2018-2019
(New Zealand) Tanya Dearns	2017–2018
(Scotland) Lesley MacDonald	2019–
