= Claire Maxwell (netball) =

Scottish netball player

Personal information
- Full name: Claire Maxwell (Née: Brownie)
- Born: 10 August 1988 (age 37) Aberdeen, Scotland
- Occupation: PE teacher
- Height: 5 ft 8.5 in (1.74 m)
- School: Turriff Academy
- University: University of Edinburgh

Netball career
- Playing positions: WD, C, GD
Years	Club team	Apps
2008–2011	Glasgow Wildcats	
2014–2016	Team Bath	
2016–	Sirens	
2017	→ Team Northumbria	
2019	→ Loughborough Lightning	
Years	National team	Caps
2009–	Scotland	100+

Claire Maxwell (born 10 August 1988), also known as Claire Brownie, is a Scotland netball international. She captained Scotland at both the 2018 Commonwealth Games and the 2019 Netball World Cup. She also represented Scotland at the 2014 Commonwealth Games and the 2015 Netball World Cup. At club level, she has played for Glasgow Wildcats, Team Bath and Sirens in the Netball Superleague and for Team Northumbria and Loughborough Lightning in the British Fast5 Netball All-Stars Championship.

== Early life and education ==
Maxwell is originally from Turriff, Aberdeenshire. She was educated at Turriff Academy and the University of Edinburgh. In 2009 she graduated from Edinburgh with a BEd in Physical Education.

== Playing career ==
=== Netball Superleague ===
Glasgow Wildcats

Between 2008 and 2011 Maxwell played for Glasgow Wildcats.

Team Bath

Between 2014 and 2016 Maxwell played for Team Bath.

Sirens

On 21 February 2017 Maxwell captained Sirens as they made their Netball Superleague debut at the Emirates Arena in a 43–57 defeat against fellow newcomers Wasps. She continued to play for Sirens during the 2018 and 2019 seasons.

=== Fast5 ===
In 2017 Maxwell played for Team Northumbria in the British Fast5 Netball All-Stars Championship. In 2019 she was a member of the Loughborough Lightning team that won the championship.

=== Scotland ===
Maxwell made her senior debut for Scotland in 2009. She previously represented Scotland at under-19, under-21 and university levels. She subsequently represented Scotland at the 2014 Commonwealth Games and 2015 Netball World Cup. She captained Scotland at both the 2018 Commonwealth Games and at the 2019 Netball World Cup. On 14 July 2019 Maxwell made her 100th senior appearance for Scotland in a 2019 Netball World Cup match against Uganda.

Tournaments	Place
2009 Netball Europe Open Championships	2nd place, silver medalist(s)
2014 Commonwealth Games	9th
2015 Netball Europe Open Championships	6th
2015 Netball World Cup	12th
2016 Netball Europe Open Championships	3rd
2017 Netball Europe Open Championships	3rd
2019 Netball World Cup Regional Qualifier – Europe	1st
2018 Commonwealth Games	9th
2019 Netball World Cup	11th
2023 Netball World Cup Regional Qualifier – Europe	2nd
2022 SPAR Diamond Challenge	2nd

== Teacher ==
Maxwell works as a PE teacher. She has worked at several schools, including Hamilton Grammar School, Royal High School, Bath and Hamilton College.

== Honours ==
Loughborough Lightning

- British Fast5 Netball All-Stars Championship
  - Winners: 2019
