= Michelle Drayne =

Gaelic footballer and netball player

Personal information
- Full name: Michelle Drayne
- Born: 22 September 1988 (age 38) Lisburn, Northern Ireland
- Occupation: Schoolteacher
- Height: 5 ft 6 in (1.68 m)
- School: Rathmore Grammar School
- University: Loughborough University

Netball career
- Playing positions: WD, C, WA
Years	Club team	Apps
199x–	Larkfield (Lisburn)	
201x–	New Cambell (Dagenham)	
2014	→ Team Northumbria	
2015–2019	→ Hertfordshire Mavericks	
2020	→ London Pulse	
Years	National team	Caps
2008–	Northern Ireland	

Michelle Drayne (born 22 September 1988) is a Northern Ireland netball international and a former Antrim ladies' Gaelic footballer. She represented Northern Ireland at the 2014 and 2018 Commonwealth Games and at the 2019 Netball World Cup. She was also a member of the Northern Ireland team that were silver medallists at the 2012 and 2017 Netball Europe Open Championships. Drayne has also played in the Netball Superleague for Team Northumbria, Saracens Mavericks and London Pulse.

== Early life, family and education ==
Drayne is from Lisburn, County Antrim. She is the daughter of Michael and Stella Drayne. She has four siblings Niamh, Maeve, Owen and Aideen. Her mother, Stella Drayne, is a former netball coach/team manager with both Larkfield and Northern Ireland under-21 teams. She has coached teams that have included her daughter. Michael Drayne is a dairy farmer and a partner in the family firm, Draynes Farm. Michael and Stella Drayne have also fronted various sports sponsorships on behalf of Draynes Farm. These include Lisburn's Sports Personality of the Year Awards. Draynes Farm also helped sponsor the Northern Ireland team at the 2017 Netball World Youth Cup. Drayne was educated at St. Joseph's Primary School in Lisburn and at Rathmore Grammar School. Between 2007 and 2010 she attended Loughborough University where she gained a BSc in Sports Science and Management and an M.Ed./PGCE in Physical Education.

== Netball ==
=== Clubs ===
==== Larkfield ====
Drayne played netball for the Lisburn–based Larkfield club in the Northern Ireland Premier League. Her teammates at Larkfield included fellow Northern Ireland internationals, Neamh Woods and Caroline O'Hanlon.

==== New Cambell ====
Drayne has also played for Dagenham-based New Cambell in the London & South-East Region Senior League.

==== Team Northumbria ====
As part of their preparations for the 2014 Commonwealth Games, the Northern Ireland national netball team formed a partnership with Team Northumbria. This saw Drayne and six other Northern Ireland internationals – Oonagh McCullough, Noleen Lennon, Caroline O'Hanlon, Gemma Gibney, Fionnuala Toner and Niamh Cooper – play for Team Northumbria during the 2014 Netball Superleague season.

==== Hertfordshire Mavericks ====
Between 2015 and 2019, Drayne played for Hertfordshire Mavericks in the Netball Superleague. Her teammates at Mavericks have included Lindsay Keable.

==== London Pulse ====
Drayne will play for London Pulse during the 2020 Netball Superleague season.

=== Northern Ireland ===
Drayne represented Northern Ireland at under-17, under-19 and under-21 levels. She made her senior debut for Northern Ireland in 2008. She has subsequently represented Northern Ireland at the 2014 and 2018 Commonwealth Games and at the 2019 Netball World Cup. She was also a member of the Northern Ireland teams that won the 2015 Nations Cup and silver medals at the 2012 and 2017 Netball Europe Open Championships. Drayne is one of several Ladies' Gaelic footballers to play netball for Northern Ireland. Others include Caroline O'Hanlon (Armagh), Neamh Woods (Tyrone) and Emma and Michelle Magee (Antrim).

Tournaments	Place
2007 Nations Cup	3rd place, bronze medalist(s)
2012 European Netball Championship	2nd place, silver medalist(s)
2012 World University Netball Championship	4th
2014 Netball Europe Open Championships	3rd
2014 Commonwealth Games	7th
2015 Netball Europe Open Championships	4th
2015 Nations Cup	1st place, gold medalist(s)
2016 Netball Europe Open Championships	4th
2017 Netball Europe Open Championships	2nd
2019 Netball World Cup Regional Qualifier – Europe	2nd
2018 Commonwealth Games	8th
2019 Netball World Cup	10th
2019 Netball Europe Open Championships	3rd place, bronze medalist(s)
2023 Netball World Cup Regional Qualifier – Europe	3rd

== Gaelic football ==
Michelle Drayne
Sport
- Sport: Ladies' Gaelic football
Club
- Years: Club
- St. Gall's
Inter-county
- Years: County
- 201x–: Antrim

=== Clubs ===
Drayne has played ladies' Gaelic football at club level for St. Gall's. In 2010 she helped St. Gall's win the Ulster Intermediate Club Ladies Football Championship and was named player of the match in the final

=== Inter-county ===
Drayne also represented Antrim in the All-Ireland Junior Ladies' Football Championship.

== Schoolteacher ==
Between July 2011 and July 2015 Drayne worked as a PE teacher at St Martin's School, Brentwood. Since September 2015, she has served as Head of Netball at New Hall School.

== Honours ==
Northern Ireland

- Nations Cup
  - Winners: 2015: 1
- Netball Europe Open Championships
  - Runner up: 2012, 2017: 2
