= Neamh Woods =

Gaelic footballer and netball player

Personal information
- Full name: Neamh Woods
- Born: 3 May 1989 (age 37)
- Occupation: PE teacher
- Height: 5 ft 7 in (1.70 m)
- School: Sacred Heart College, Omagh
- University: University of Ulster, Jordanstown; Queen's University

Netball career
- Playing positions: WA, C, WD
Years	Club team	Apps
200x–	Larkfield (Lisburn)	
Years	National team	Caps
200x–	Northern Ireland	

Neamh Woods is a Northern Ireland netball international and a Tyrone Ladies' Gaelic footballer. She was a member of the Northern Ireland teams at the 2018 Commonwealth Games and the 2019 Netball World Cup. As a Ladies' Gaelic footballer she played for Tyrone in the 2010 All-Ireland final. She captained Tyrone when they won the 2018 All-Ireland Intermediate Ladies' Football Championship. She was an All Star in 2008 and 2018 and was the 2018 TG4 Intermediate Player's Player of the Year.

== Early life, family and education ==
Woods is from Clanabogan, County Tyrone. Her father, Seamus Woods, played Gaelic football as a midfielder for Tyrone during the 1970s. Together with his brothers, Canice and Laurence, he also helped Carrickmore win the Tyrone Senior Football Championship in 1977, 1978 and 1979. More recently he has managed ladies' Gaelic football teams at Drumragh Sarsfields. Neamh began playing netball while attending Sacred Heart College, Omagh. She subsequently attended University of Ulster, Jordanstown and Queen's University, where she studied physical education.

== Netball ==
=== Clubs ===
Woods plays netball for the Lisburn–based Larkfield club in the Northern Ireland Premier League. Her teammates at Larkfield include fellow Northern Ireland international, Caroline O'Hanlon and Michelle Drayne.

=== Northern Ireland ===
Woods has represented Northern Ireland at under-17, under-19, under-21, university and senior levels. She was a member of the Northern Ireland team that won 2015 Nations Cup. She also helped Northern Ireland win the silver medal at the 2017 Netball Europe Open Championships. She was subsequently a member of the Northern Ireland teams at the 2018 Commonwealth Games and at the 2019 Netball World Cup. Woods is one of several Ladies' Gaelic footballers to play netball for Northern Ireland. Others include Caroline O'Hanlon (Armagh), Laura Mason (Down) and Michelle Drayne, Emma and Michelle Magee (all Antrim).

Tournaments	Place
2007 Nations Cup	3rd place, bronze medalist(s)
2015 Netball Europe Open Championships	4th
2015 Nations Cup	1st place, gold medalist(s)
2016 Netball Europe Open Championships	4th
2017 Netball Europe Open Championships	2nd
2019 Netball World Cup Regional Qualifier – Europe	2nd
2018 Commonwealth Games	8th
2019 Netball World Cup	10th

== Gaelic football ==
Neamh Woods
Sport
- Sport: Ladies' Gaelic football
- Position: Defender/Midfielder
Clubs
- Years: Club
- 2008–2012 2014: Drumragh Sarsfields → UUJ → Queen's University
Inter-county
- Years: County
- 200x–: Tyrone
Inter-county titles
- All Stars: 2

=== Clubs ===
Woods plays Ladies' Gaelic football at club level for Drumragh Sarsfields. Before 2003 the club did not have girls or ladies teams so Woods played with boys teams up to under-14 level. At an All-Ireland Feile when Drumragh played Glenswilly she marked Michael Murphy. In 2008 she was a member of the University of Ulster, Jordanstown team that won the O'Connor Cup. She also played for UUJ in the 2010, 2011 and 2012 O'Connor Cup finals and for Queen's University in the 2014 final.

=== Inter-county ===
Woods played for Tyrone in the 2010 All-Ireland Senior Ladies' Football Championship final against Dublin. In 2018 she captained Tyrone when they won the All-Ireland Intermediate Ladies' Football Championship. In the final she scored two goals as Tyrone defeated Meath 6–8 to 1–14. Woods was also named player of the match. In 2008 and 2018 Woods was selected as an All Star. In 2018 she was named the TG4 Intermediate Player's Player of the Year.

	All-Ireland Finals	Place	Opponent	Goal/Points
1	2010 Senior	Runner up	Dublin	0–0
2	2017 Intermediate	Runner up	Tipperary	0–0
3	2018 Intermediate	Winners	Meath	2–0

== Personal life ==
Woods is a PE teacher. She has worked at Sacred Heart College, Omagh and St Ciaran's College, Ballygawley.

== Honours ==
=== Netball ===
Northern Ireland

- Nations Cup
  - Winners: 2015
- European Netball Championship
  - Runners Up: 2017

=== Gaelic football ===
Tyrone

- All-Ireland Senior Ladies' Football Championship
  - Runners Up: 2010
- All-Ireland Intermediate Ladies' Football Championship
  - Winners: 2018
  - Runners Up: 2017

University of Ulster, Jordanstown

- O'Connor Cup
  - Winners: 2008
  - Runner up: 2010, 2011, 2012

Queen's University

- O'Connor Cup
  - Runner up: 2014

Individual

- All Stars
  - 2008, 2018
- TG4 Intermediate Player's Player of the Year
  - 2018
