= Fionnuala Toner =

Northern Ireland netball player

Personal information
- Full name: Fionnuala Toner
- Born: 6 March 1990 (age 36) Lisburn, Northern Ireland
- Occupation: Chartered Accountant
- Height: 5 ft 9 in (1.75 m)
- Relative: Máire Toner (sister)
- School: Our Lady and St Patrick's College; Kent School
- University: Queen's University; MacMurray College; Ulster University

Netball career
- Playing positions: GD, WD, C
| Years | Club team | Apps |
| 2002– | Belfast Ladies | |
| 2014–2015 | → Team Northumbria | |
| 2019 | → London Pulse | 18 |
| 2020 | → Team Bath | |
| Years | National team | Caps |
| 2009– | Northern Ireland | 81 |

Fionnuala Toner (born 6 March 1990) is a Northern Ireland netball international. She represented Northern Ireland at the 2011 and 2019 Netball World Cups and at the 2014 and 2018 Commonwealth Games. She was also a member of the Northern Ireland team that were silver medallists at the 2017 Netball Europe Open Championships. She has played in the Netball Superleague for Team Northumbria, London Pulse and Team Bath. Toner is also an Ireland women's basketball international. Her younger sister, Máire Toner, is also a Northern Ireland netball international.

== Early life, family and education ==
Toner was raised in the Malone Road district of Belfast. Her younger sister, Máire Toner, is also a Northern Ireland netball international. Between 2001 and 2008 Fionnuala attended Our Lady and St Patrick's College, where she played both netball and basketball. Between 2008 and 2009 she attended Kent School, where she played basketball and lacrosse. Between 2009 and 2013 she attended Queen's University, where she gained a BSc in Accounting. Between 2011 and 2012 she attended MacMurray College. In 2013–14 she gained a Postgraduate diploma in Advanced Accounting from Ulster University.

== Netball ==
=== Clubs ===
==== Belfast Ladies ====
While attending Our Lady and St Patrick's College, Toner began playing netball for Belfast Ladies, the club based at her school.

==== Team Northumbria ====
As part of their preparations for the 2014 Commonwealth Games, the Northern Ireland national netball team formed a partnership with Team Northumbria. This saw Toner and six other Northern Ireland internationals – Oonagh McCullough, Noleen Lennon, Caroline O'Hanlon, Gemma Gibney, Michelle Drayne and Niamh Cooper – play for Team Northumbria during the 2014 Netball Superleague season. Toner and O'Hanlon also played for Team Northumbria during the 2015 season.

==== London Pulse ====
Toner played for London Pulse during the 2019 Netball Superleague season. She was named player of the match as the new franchise defeated Severn Stars in their opening game. She finished the season with most interceptions after appearing in all 18 matches for London Pulse.

==== Team Bath ====
Toner will play for Team Bath in the 2020 Netball Superleague season.

=== Northern Ireland ===
Toner made her senior debut for Northern Ireland at the 2009 Nations Cup. She has subsequently represented Northern Ireland at the 2011 and 2019 Netball World Cups and at the 2014 and 2018 Commonwealth Games. She was also a member of the Northern Ireland teams that won the 2015 Nations Cup and the silver medal at the 2017 Netball Europe Open Championships.

| Tournaments | Place |
|---|---|
| 2009 Nations Cup | 1st place, gold medalist(s) |
| 2011 World Netball Championships | 8th |
| 2012 World University Netball Championship | 4th |
| 2014 Netball Europe Open Championships | 3rd |
| 2014 Commonwealth Games | 7th |
| 2015 Netball Europe Open Championships | 4th |
| 2015 Nations Cup | 1st place, gold medalist(s) |
| 2016 Netball Europe Open Championships | 4th |
| 2017 Netball Europe Open Championships | 2nd |
| 2019 Netball World Cup Regional Qualifier – Europe | 2nd |
| 2018 Commonwealth Games | 8th |
| 2019 Netball World Cup | 10th |
| 2019 Netball Europe Open Championships | 3rd place, bronze medalist(s) |
| 2023 Netball World Cup Regional Qualifier – Europe | 3rd |
| 2024 Celtic Cup | 4th |

== Basketball ==
Fionnuala Toner
- Position: Guard

Career history
- 200x–2008: Our Lady and St Patrick's College
- 2008–2009: Kent School
- c. 2011: Queen's University
- c. 2011: Ulster Rockets
- 2011–2012: MacMurray College
- 2014–2018: DCU Mercy

Career highlights
- Included in Ireland squad for the 2016 FIBA Women's European Championship for Small Countries

=== Schools and universities ===
Toner played basketball for both Our Lady and St Patrick's College and Kent School. Between 2011 and 2012 she played for MacMurray College.

=== Clubs ===
Together with Noleen Lennon, she was a member of the Ulster Rockets team that won Basketball Ireland's Women's National Cup in January 2011. Between 2014 and 2018 she played for DCU Mercy. Her team mates at DCU included Lindsay Peat.

=== Ireland ===
Toner was included in the Ireland squad for the 2016 FIBA Women's European Championship for Small Countries.

== Occupation ==
Since 2014 Toner has worked as an accountant for Deloitte Ireland, based in Dublin. She is a graduate of Chartered Accountants Ireland.

== Honours ==
Northern Ireland

- Nations Cup
  - Winners: 2009, 2015: 2
- Netball Europe Open Championships
  - Runner up: 2017: 1
