= Sacred Heart College, Omagh =

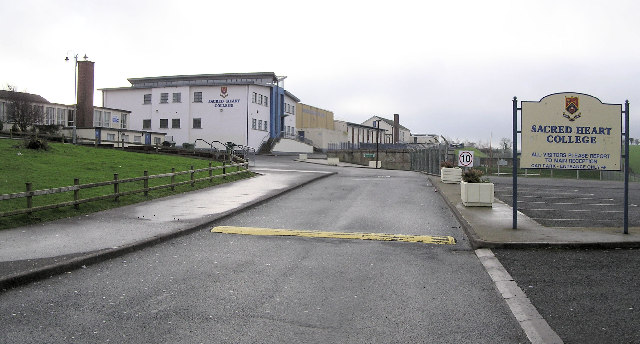
- View of the grounds (2006)

Location
- Kevlin Road; Omagh; County Tyrone; BT78 1LG; Northern Ireland
- Coordinates: 54.598°N 7.302°W

Information
- Religious affiliation: Roman Catholic
- Principal: Michael Gormley
- Gender: Boys and Girls
- Age: 11 to 19
- Enrollment: c. 900
- Website: www.shcomagh.co.uk

The Sacred Heart College is a secondary school based in Omagh, County Tyrone, Northern Ireland.

== Principals ==
No.	Name	Tenure
1	Donal McDermott	2000–2009
2	Dominic Clarke	2009–2016
3	Sinead McAllister	2016–2020
4	Michael Gormley	2021–present

== Notable former pupils ==
- Neamh Woods, Northern Ireland netball international and Tyrone Ladies' Gaelic footballer. Woods also worked as a PE teacher at the school.
