= Hayley Mulheron =

Scotland netball international

Personal information
- Full name: Hayley Mulheron
- Born: 27 April 1986 (age 40) Glasgow, Scotland
- Height: 1.83 m (6 ft 0 in)

Netball career
- Playing positions: GK, GD
| Years | Club team | Apps |
| 2008–2011 | Glasgow Wildcats | |
| 2015 | Team Northumbria | |
| 2016 | Canberra Darters | |
| 2016 | → GWS Fury | |
| 2017 | NNSW Waratahs | |
| 2017 | → Panthers | |
| 2017 | Sirens | |
| 2018 | Queensland Fusion | |
| 2018 | Team Northumbria | |
| 2018–2019 | Sirens | |
| 2020 | CLC Tigers | |
| 2021 | Brisbane South Wildcats | |
| Years | National team | Caps |
| 200x– | Scotland | 114+ |

Hayley Mulheron (born 27 April 1986) is a Scotland netballer. She captained Scotland at the 2015 Netball World Cup. She also represented Scotland at the 2007 and 2019 Netball World Cups and at the 2014 and 2018 Commonwealth Games. At club level, she has played for Glasgow Wildcats, Team Northumbria and Sirens in the Netball Superleague and for Canberra Darters and Netball New South Wales Waratahs in the Australian Netball League.

== Playing career ==
=== Netball Superleague ===
Glasgow Wildcats

Between 2008 and 2011, Mulheron played for Glasgow Wildcats in the Netball Superleague.

Team Northumbria

Mulheron has had two spells playing for Team Northumbria in the Netball Superleague. She first played for them in 2015. She returned to play for Team Northumbria in 2018.

Sirens

Mulheron has also had two spells playing for Sirens. She first played for them in 2017. She rejoined Sirens in 2018 and played for them in the 2018 Netball New Zealand Super Club and in the 2018 British Fast5 Netball All-Stars Championship. She also played for Sirens during the 2019 Netball Superleague season.

=== Australian Netball League ===
After representing Scotland at the 2015 Netball World Cup, Mulheron stayed on in Australia. She subsequently played for three teams in the Australian Netball League. In 2016 she played for Canberra Darters and in 2017 she played for New South Wales Waratahs. She was also named in the 2018 Queensland Fusion squad.

=== State leagues ===
Mulheron has played in the Netball NSW Premier League. In 2016 she played for GWS Fury and in 2017 she played for Panthers. She has also played in the HART Sapphire Series. In 2020 she played for Carina Leagues Club Tigers and in 2021 she played for Brisbane South Wildcats.

=== Scotland ===
Mulheron has represented Scotland at the 2007, 2015 and 2019 Netball World Cups. She also represented Scotland at the 2014 and 2018 Commonwealth Games. She was vice captain at the 2014 tournament. She captained Scotland at the 2015 Netball World Cup.

| Tournaments | Place |
|---|---|
| 2007 World Netball Championships | 14th |
| 2014 Commonwealth Games | 9th |
| 2015 Netball Europe Open Championships | 6th |
| 2015 Netball World Cup | 12th |
| 2016 Netball Europe Open Championships | 3rd |
| 2017 Netball Europe Open Championships | 3rd |
| 2019 Netball World Cup Regional Qualifier – Europe | 1st |
| 2018 Commonwealth Games | 9th |
| 2019 Netball World Cup | 11th |
