= 2011 World Netball Championships squads =

Sixteen nations qualified for the 2011 World Netball Championships, to be held in Singapore from 3–10 July. Participating nations have sent representative netball teams each comprising 12 players. Player rosters for all 16 teams were submitted to tournament organisers, and published on the WNC2011 website two days before the start of the tournament. Teams were divided into four groups for the initial pool stage.

== Pool A ==
=== Australia ===
- Region: Oceania
- IFNA ranking: 2

Players
Coaching staff
Natalie von Bertouch (c)
Catherine Cox
Caitlin Bassett
Chelsea Pitman
Erin Bell
Julie Corletto
Kimberlee Green
Laura Geitz
Mo'onia Gerrard
Natalie Medhurst
Sharni Layton
Susan Fuhrmann
- Head coach: Norma Plummer
- Assistant coach: Nicole Cusack

Team colours

=== Samoa ===
- Region: Oceania
- IFNA ranking: 9

Players
Coaching staff
Shirin Chang
Malu Faasavalu
Opheira Harder Karatau (c)
Sepi Langi
Siosina Lui
Tiffany Nelson
Sanonu Robertson
Lyttera Sosoli
Sose Tavae
Tafaoga Tavae
Sanita Too
Monique Vaai
- Head coach: Linda Vagana
- Asst coach: Henry Tunupopo
- Manager: Rosemarie Esera

Team colours

=== Northern Ireland ===
- Region: Europe
- IFNA ranking: 12

Players
Coaching staff
Kyla Bowman
Micaela Brunton
Frances Campbell
Gemma Gibney
Hannah Irvine
Noleen Lennon
Laura Mason
Lisa McCaffery
Deborah McCarthy
Oonagh McCullough
Caroline O'Hanlon
Fionnuala Toner
- Head coach: Elaine Rice
- Assistant coach: Clar Rois McGuinness
- Manager: Karen Rollo

Team colours

=== Sri Lanka ===
- Region: Asia
- IFNA ranking: 18

Players
Coaching staff
Sanduni Bollegala
Viraji Chamari
W.M.N.M. Dhammika
Shalika Erangani
Mareesha Fernando
Chathurangi Jayasuriya
Priscilla Koch
Iresha Koralagodage
Gayathri Lankathilaka
Sashika Samarasinghe
Kumarini Silva (co-captain)
Tharjini Sivalingam (co-captain)
- Head coach: Hyacinth Wijesinghe
- Manager: Surangani Wijendra

Team colours

== Pool B ==
=== New Zealand ===
- Region: Oceania
- IFNA ranking: 1

Players
Coaching staff
Leana de Bruin
Temepara George (vc)
Katrina Grant
Paula Griffin
Joline Henry
Laura Langman
Liana Leota
Anna Scarlett
Anna Thompson
Maria Tutaia
Irene van Dyk
Casey Williams (c)
- Head coach: Ruth Aitken
- Asst coach: Waimarama Taumaunu

Team colours

=== Fiji ===
- Region: Oceania
- IFNA ranking: 5

Players
Coaching staff
Bernadette Daurewa
Luse Kotobalavu
Maria Lutua
Teimumu Moce
Simone Nalatu
Mere Rabuka
Afa Rusivakula
Elenoa Vatureba
Seruwaia Vonolagi (vc)
Elesi Waqa
Matila Waqanidrola (c)
Vaiti Waqatabu
- Co-coach: Gabby Qoro
- Co-coach: Unaisi Rokoura
- Manager: Asenaca Waqanivavalagi

Team colours

=== Trinidad and Tobago ===
- Region: Americas
- IFNA ranking: 8

Players
Coaching staff
Janelle Barker (c)
Kielle Connelly
Joelisa Cooper
Crystal-Ann George
Candice Guerero
Onella Jack
Rhonda John-Davis
Anika La Roche (vc)
Alicia Liverpool
Tricia Liverpool
Jellene Richardson
Anastacia Wilson
- Head coach: (Australia) Karen Worland
- Assistant coach: Jennifer Frank
- Manager: Carol Gitten

Team colours

=== Wales ===
- Region: Europe
- IFNA ranking: 13

Players
Coaching staff
Jamilla Abbott
Sophie Baxter
Suzy Drane (co-captain)
Sara Hale (co-captain)
Becky James
Nichola James
Chelsea Lewis
Joanne McKinney
Sophie Morgan
Cara Moseley
Emma Thomas
Stephanie Williams
- Head coach: (New Zealand) Melissa Hyndman
- Assistant coach: Laura Williams
- Manager: Wendy Pressdee

Team colours

== Pool C ==
=== Jamaica ===
- Region: Americas
- IFNA ranking: 4

Players
Coaching staff
Romelda Aiken
Nicole Aiken-Pinnock
Nadine Bryan (c)
Althea Byfield
Jodi-Ann Ffrench-Kentish
Jhaniele Fowler
Anna-Kay Griffths
Sasher-Gaye Henry (vc)
Malysha Kelly
Kameika Sherwood
Paula Thompson
Kimone Tulloch
- Heach coach: Oberon Pitterson
- Assistant coach: Annette Daley
- Manager: Hyacinth Beckford

Team colours

=== Singapore ===
- Region: Asia
- IFNA ranking: 19

Players
Coaching staff
Nurul Baizura
Pearline Chan
Chen Hui Fen
Premila Hirubalan
Vanessa Lee
Li Ling
Lin Qingyi (vc)
Jean Ng (c)
Charlene Porima
Charmaine Soh
Tan Hui Yan
Asha Tett
- Head coach: (Australia) Kate Carpenter
- Assistant coach: Yeo Mee Hong
- Manager: Lee Min Li
- Technical Director: (Australia) Jill McIntosh

Team colours

=== South Africa ===
- Region: Africa
- IFNA ranking: 6

Squad
Coaching staff
Claudia Basson
Chrisna Bootha
Erin Burger
Zukelwa Cwaba
Vanes-Mari Du Toit
Nosiphiwo Goda
Maryka Holtzhausen
Tsakane Mbewe
Zanele Mdodana (vc)
Karla Mostert
Bongiwe Msomi
Amanda Mynhardt (c)
Nokuthula Qegu
Carine Terblanche
Leigh-Ann Zackey
- Head coach: Elize Kotze

Team colours

=== Botswana ===
- Region: Africa
- IFNA ranking: 17

Players
Coaching staff
Ogone Gabaratane
Florah Keeditse
Kelebogile Mangole
Kagisano Mawela
Violet Moabi
Botlhale Moeng
Ntebogang Motlakaleso
Tebogo Radipotsane
Portia Rasekhumba (c)
Thulaganyo Segopolo
Tshegofatso Thabuswe
Gagotheko Tshelametsi
- Head coach: Seipei Gaelisiwe
- Assistant coach: Delroy Nkomazana
- Manager: Gabankitse Mpete

Team colours

== Pool D ==
=== England ===
- Region: Europe
- IFNA ranking: 3

Players
Coaching staff
Karen Atkinson (co-captain)
Eboni Beckford-Chambers
Louisa Brownfield
Jade Clarke
Pamela Cookey
Rachel Dunn
Stacey Francis
Tamsin Greenway
Serena Guthrie
Jo Harten
Geva Mentor
Sonia Mkoloma (co-captain)
- Head coach: (Australia) Sue Hawkins

Team colours

=== Malawi ===
- Region: Africa
- IFNA ranking: 7

Players
Coaching staff
Ellen Chibokho
Florence Chirwa
Joanna Kachilika
Tina Kamuyambeni
Beatrice Mpinganjira
Bridget Kumwenda
Mwayi Kumwenda
Caroline Mtukule-Ngwira (vc)
Joyce Mvula
Grace Mwafulirwa (c)
Sindi Sumutowe
Towera Vinkhumbo.
- Head coach: Edith Kaliati
- Assistant coach: Peace Chawinga-Kalua

Team colours

=== Barbados ===
- Region: Americas
- IFNA ranking: 9

Players
Coaching staff
Lydia Bishop
Latonia Blackman (vc)
Nadia Blackman
Laurel Browne
Sabrina Browne
Samantha Browne
Shonette Azore-Bruce
Kizzy Marville (c)
Nikita Piggott
Lisa Puckerin
Faye Sealy
Sabreena Smith
- Head coach: Alwyn Babb
- Asst coach: Jacquelyn Forde-Brome
- Manager: Marcia Oxley

Team colours

=== Malaysia ===
- Region: Asia
- IFNA ranking: 23

Players
Coaching staff
Aruna Santhappan (c)
Nur Ezzaini Mohd Nor
Norashikin Kamal Zaman
Izyan Syazana Mohd Wazir
Nurul Adha Abu Bakar
Siti Nor Farhana Mustafa
Noramirah Dayana Noor Azhar
Nur Syafazliyana Mohd Ali
Nurul Shaffa Mustafa
Nur Shamilia Mohd Samsudin
Nur Salfarina Mohd Amin
Noor Atika Mohd Radzi
- Head coach: Choo Kon Lee
- Manager: Datin Seri Shamsiah M. Yasin

Team colours
