= Caroline O'Hanlon =

Gaelic footballer and netball player

Personal information
- Full name: Caroline O'Hanlon
- Born: 8 August 1984 (age 42) Newry, Northern Ireland
- Occupation: Doctor
- Height: 5 ft 8.5 in (1.74 m)
- School: Sacred Heart Grammar School
- University: Queen's University

Netball career
- Playing positions: GA, C, WA
Years	Club team	Apps
200x–	Larkfield (Lisburn)	
2014–2015	→ Team Northumbria	
2017	→ UWS Sirens	
2018–	→ Manchester Thunder	
Years	National team	Caps
2002–	Northern Ireland	130+
2009	→ Great Britain	

Caroline O'Hanlon is a Northern Ireland netball international and an Armagh ladies' Gaelic footballer. She has also represented Ireland at international rules. She was a member of the Northern Ireland teams at the 2003, 2011 and 2019 Netball World Cups and at the 2014 and 2018 Commonwealth Games. She was also a member of the Northern Ireland teams that were silver medallists at the 2012 and 2017 Netball Europe Open Championships. She captained Northern Ireland at both the 2018 Commonwealth Games and at the 2019 Netball World Cup. She carried the flag of Northern Ireland during the 2018 Commonwealth Games opening ceremony. She has played in the Netball Superleague for Team Northumbria, UWS Sirens and Manchester Thunder. She was a member of the Manchester Thunder team that won the 2019 Netball Superleague. As a Ladies' Gaelic footballer she played for Armagh in the 2006 All-Ireland final. She has also been an All Star on three occasions and was named as the 2014 TG4 Senior Player's Player of the Year. In 2010 she was named Northern Ireland Sportswoman of the Year.

== Early life, family and education ==
O'Hanlon is the daughter of Charlie and Marion O'Hanlon. Her father is a farmer. Like his daughter, he also played Gaelic football for both St Patrick's Carrickcruppen and Armagh. He was a member of the St Patrick's team that won three Armagh Senior Football Championships in 1978, 1979 and 1982. Her mother was a teacher. She has one sibling, a sister Joanne. O'Hanlon was educated at Sacred Heart Grammar School and at Queen's University Belfast. O'Hanlon began playing both Gaelic football and netball at an early age. Her family home is in Bessbrook, County Armagh. O'Hanlon is a doctor and studied medicine at Queen's. She has worked at both Craigavon Area Hospital and Daisy Hill Hospital and as a GP in the Newcastle and Dundrum areas of County Down.

== Netball ==
=== Clubs ===
==== Larkfield ====
O'Hanlon plays netball for the Lisburn–based Larkfield club in the Northern Ireland Premier League. She has captained the team to several leagues titles and cup wins. Her team mates at Larkfield include fellow Northern Ireland internationals, Neamh Woods and Michelle Drayne.

==== Team Northumbria ====
As part of their preparations for the 2014 Commonwealth Games, the Northern Ireland national netball team formed a partnership with Team Northumbria. This saw O'Hanlon and six other Northern Ireland internationals – Oonagh McCullough, Noleen Lennon, Fionnuala Toner, Gemma Gibney, Michelle Drayne and Niamh Cooper – play for Team Northumbria during the 2014 Netball Superleague season. O'Hanlon and Toner also played for Team Northumbria during the 2015 season.

==== UWS Sirens ====
O'Hanlon played for UWS Sirens during the 2017 Netball Superleague season.

==== Manchester Thunder ====
In 2018 O'Hanlon began playing for Manchester Thunder. She was a member of the Manchester Thunder team that won the 2019 and 2022 Netball Superleague.

=== International ===
==== Northern Ireland ====
O'Hanlon was a member of the Northern Ireland teams at the 2003, 2011 and 2019 Netball World Cups and at the 2014 and 2018 Commonwealth Games. She was also a member of the Northern Ireland teams that won the 2009 and 2015 Netball Singapore Nations Cups. She was Player of the Tournament at the latter tournament. She was also a member of the Northern Ireland teams that were silver medallists at the 2012 and 2017 Netball Europe Open Championships. She captained Northern Ireland at both the 2018 Commonwealth Games and at the 2019 Netball World Cup. She also carried the flag of Northern Ireland during the 2018 Commonwealth Games opening ceremony. O'Hanlon is one of several of several Ladies' Gaelic footballers to play netball for Northern Ireland. Others include Neamh Woods (Tyrone), Laura Mason (Down) and Michelle Drayne, Emma and Michelle Magee (all Antrim). On 29 November 2025, during the 2025 Celtic Cup, O'Hanlon made her 130th senior appearance for Northern Ireland in a match against Scotland.

Tournaments	Place
2003 World Netball Championships	19th
2007 Netball Singapore Nations Cup	3rd place, bronze medalist(s)
2009 Netball Singapore Nations Cup	1st place, gold medalist(s)
2011 World Netball Championships	8th
2012 European Netball Championship	2nd place, silver medalist(s)
2012 World University Netball Championship	4th
2014 Netball Europe Open Championships	3rd
2014 Commonwealth Games	7th
2015 Netball Europe Open Championships	4th
2015 Nations Cup	1st place, gold medalist(s)
2016 Netball Europe Open Championships	4th
2017 Netball Europe Open Championships	2nd
2019 Netball World Cup Regional Qualifier – Europe	2nd
2018 Commonwealth Games	8th
2019 Netball World Cup	10th
2019 Netball Europe Open Championships	3rd
2023 Netball World Cup Regional Qualifier – Europe	3rd
2025 Celtic Cup	6th

==== Great Britain ====
O'Hanlon has also represented Great Britain at university level. She has played both for and against the Great Britain university team.

== Gaelic football ==
Caroline O'Hanlon
Sport
- Sport: Ladies' Gaelic football
- Position: Midfield
Clubs
- Years: Club
- St Patrick's Carrickcruppen → Queen's University
Inter-county
- Years: County
- 2000–: Armagh
Inter-county titles
- All Stars: 3

=== Club level ===
At club level, O'Hanlon plays for St Patrick's Carrickcruppen. In 2010 she captained the club to their first Armagh Senior Ladies' Football Championship. She was named player of the match in the final after scoring 1–6. O'Hanlon scored 0–4 for Queen's University in the 2014 O'Connor Cup final as they lost 3–7 to 1–9 against University of Limerick.

=== Inter-county ===
Since 2000 O'Hanlon has played senior Ladies' Gaelic football for Armagh, representing her county in senior competitions such as the All-Ireland Senior Ladies' Football Championship, the Ulster Senior Ladies' Football Championship and the Ladies' National Football League. She played for Armagh in the 2006 All-Ireland Senior Ladies' Football Championship final against Cork. Cork won 1–7 to 1–6. O'Hanlon scored 0–2 in the final. In 2014 she captained Armagh to the Ulster title, defeating Monaghan 2–14 to 1–8 in the final. O'Hanlon scored 1–2 in the final. In 2015 she captained Armagh to the 2015 Ladies' National Football League Division 2 title.

In 2006, 2012 and 2014 O'Hanlon was selected as an All Star. In 2012 she was named the TG4 Intermediate Player's Player of the Year and in 2014 she was named the TG4 Senior Player's Player of the Year. She was the first non-Cork player to win the award.

=== International rules football ===
O'Hanlon was a member of the Ireland women's international rules football team that defeated Australia in the 2006 Ladies' International Rules Series.

== Honours ==
=== Individual ===
- Northern Ireland Sportswoman of the Year
  - 2010

=== Netball ===
Northern Ireland

- Nations Cup
  - Winners: 2009, 2015: 2
- Netball Europe Open Championships
  - Runner up: 2012, 2017: 2

Manchester Thunder

- Netball Superleague
  - Winners: 2019: 1

Larkfield

- NI Premier League
  - Winners: 2014, 2015, 2016, 2017: 4 ?

=== Gaelic football ===
Armagh

- All-Ireland Senior Ladies' Football Championship
  - Runners Up: 2006
- Ulster Senior Ladies' Football Championship
  - Winners: 2014
- Ladies' National Football League Division 2
  - Winners: 2015

St Patrick's Carrickcruppen

- Armagh Senior Ladies' Football Championship
  - Winners: 2015

Queen's University

- O'Connor Cup
  - Runner up: 2014

Individual

- All Stars
  - 2006, 2012, 2014: 3
- TG4 Senior Player's Player of the Year
  - 2014
- TG4 Intermediate Player's Player of the Year
  - 2012
