= Máire Toner =

Northern Ireland netball player

Personal information
- Full name: Máire Toner
- Born: 1 April 1992 (age 34) Belfast, Northern Ireland
- Occupation: Solicitor
- Relative: Fionnuala Toner (sister)
- School: Our Lady and St Patrick's College; Kent School
- University: Queen's University

Netball career
- Playing positions: GA, GS
Years	Club team	Apps
200x–	Belfast Ladies	
Years	National team	Caps
2012–	Northern Ireland	

Máire Toner (born 1 April 1992) is a Northern Ireland netball international. She represented Northern Ireland at the 2014 Commonwealth Games. She was also a member of the Northern Ireland team that were silver medallists at the 2012 European Netball Championship. Her older sister, Fionnuala Toner, is also a Northern Ireland netball international.

== Early life, family and education ==
Toner was raised in the Malone Road district of Belfast. Her older sister, Fionnuala Toner, is also a Northern Ireland netball international. Between 2003 and 2010 Máire attended Our Lady and St Patrick's College. Between 2010 and 2011 she attended Kent School. Between 2011 and 2014 she attended Queen's University where she studied Law and Politics. As well as playing netball, Toner also played basketball for both Our Lady and St Patrick's College and Queen's University.

== Playing career ==
=== Clubs ===
Belfast Ladies

At club level Toner played for Belfast Ladies.

=== Northern Ireland ===
Toner represented Northern Ireland at under-17 and under-21 levels. She captained the under-21 team. Toner made her senior debut for Northern Ireland in 2012. She subsequently represented Northern Ireland at the 2014 Commonwealth Games. She was also a member of the Northern Ireland team that were silver medallists at the 2012 European Netball Championship.

Tournaments	Place
2012 European Netball Championship	2nd place, silver medalist(s)
2012 World University Netball Championship	4th
2014 Netball Europe Open Championships	3rd
2014 Commonwealth Games	7th

== Occupation ==
Since 2017 Toner has worked as a solicitor for Clifford Chance.

== Honours ==
Northern Ireland

- European Netball Championship
  - Runner up: 2012
