= Our Lady and St Patrick's College, Knock =

Our Lady and St Patrick's College Knock
- Belfast, Northern Ireland

Information
- Type: Grammar school
- Religious affiliation: Catholic
- Principal: Deborah McLaughlin
- Gender: Coeducational
- Age: 11 to 18
- Enrolment: 1230 (approx)
- Colour
- Motto: ‘Gratias Agamus’ (Let us give thanks)
- Website: www.knock.co.uk

Our Lady and St Patrick's College, Knock, known locally as Knock, OLSPCK or St Pats is a Catholic diocesan grammar school in Knock in the east of Belfast in Northern Ireland. The school, with an expanding enrolment, announced in late 2019 it anticipated future enrolment of 1,330.

== Foundation ==
The school opened as St Patrick's College on 4 September 1967 on a 20-acre (81,000 m^{2}) site at Gortgrib in the Cherryvalley area of east Belfast with Fr. Joseph Conway as president. It is a sister college of St Malachy's College and St MacNissi's College, Garron Tower.

By the previous April, the need for a new boys' grammar school catering for the North Down and East Belfast area had become urgent. There was no provision for Catholic grammar education east of the River Lagan and it was clear, given the trends of the time, that there would be no capacity in the existing two Belfast grammar schools for boys - St Malachy's and St Mary's Christian Brothers' Grammar School, Belfast - for the September 1967 intake. Three priests from St Malachy's – Head of English, Fr Joseph Conway, with Fr John O'Sullivan and Fr Albert McNally – were appointed by The Most Rev. William Philbin, Bishop of Down and Connor, to found the new diocesan college.

The site for the new school was Providence Farm at Cherryvalley. The property had been in the hands of the Diocese of Down and Connor since the middle of the 19th century.

The college motto, chosen by Bishop William Philbin, was In omnibus gratias agite ('give thanks in all circumstances') (I Thess, 5:18)

== Amalgamation and Senior Administration ==
In 1984 the college trustees, chaired by Bishop Cahal Daly proposed that from September 1985 the college should become co-educational and remain on the Knock site through amalgamation with the Sacred Heart of Mary Grammar School in Holywood, County Down. This new foundation became known as Our Lady and St Patrick's College, Knock with an enrolment of almost nine hundred pupils, and the motto Gratias Agamus (Let Us Give Thanks).

Rev Joseph Conway remained as president of the amalgamated school until 1987 when he was succeeded by Rev Patrick (Paddy) McKenna, who had had a distinguished teaching career in St MacNissi's College, Garron Tower. Fr McKenna served as president for twelve years until 1999 when he left teaching for full-time ministry. John Allen took over as principal of the school, the first lay person appointed to this position.

Allen was replaced in the 2008–09 academic year by Dermot G Mullan a former history teacher at the college who had left to be principal at St Patrick's Grammar School, Downpatrick. Mullan retired in June 2018.

In June 2018 it was announced that the new principal, effective 27 August 2018, would be Miss Deborah McLaughlin, the college's vice-principal. She succeeded Dermot Mullan.

== New College Buildings ==
The original buildings were designed for approximately 800 pupils, but with an average enrolment of 1250 from the late 1990s onwards it was clearly over stretched. There were approximately 30 mobile classrooms in the form of 15 double-room mobiles.

In March 2011 all teaching transferred to the new £25 million building, constructed on the existing 18-acre site.

The current (2024) chair of the governors is Mr Leo O'Reilly, former Permanent Secretary of Department for Communities in the Northern Ireland Civil Service.

== Awards ==
In 2023 the college was recorded as being the 3rd best post-primary school in The Sunday Times.

In 2018, it had been ranked joint first in Northern Ireland for its GCSE performance with 100% of its entrants receiving five or more GCSEs at grades A* to C, including the core subjects English and maths. In the 2019 Belfast Telegraph League Table, it was ranked joint sixth with 99.4% of its GCSE entrants in the 2017–18 exams receiving five or more grades at A* to C.

In 2019 the school was ranked 13th out of 159 secondary schools in Northern Ireland with 88.0% of its A-level students who sat the exams in 2017–18 being awarded three A*-C grades.

== Former staff ==
Bishop Donal McKeown was on the college staff from 1978 to 1983, along with several other priests of the Diocese of Down and Connor, including founders Fr Joseph Conway, Fr John O'Sullivan and Fr Albert McNally; also Fr Patrick McKenna, Fr John Forsyth, Fr Patrick Foy and Fr David Delargy (member of The Priests).

Lay staff included the BBC broadcaster Seamus McKee, and the widely acknowledged Irish poet Medbh McGuckian, both teachers in the academically and creatively strong English department.

== Alumni ==
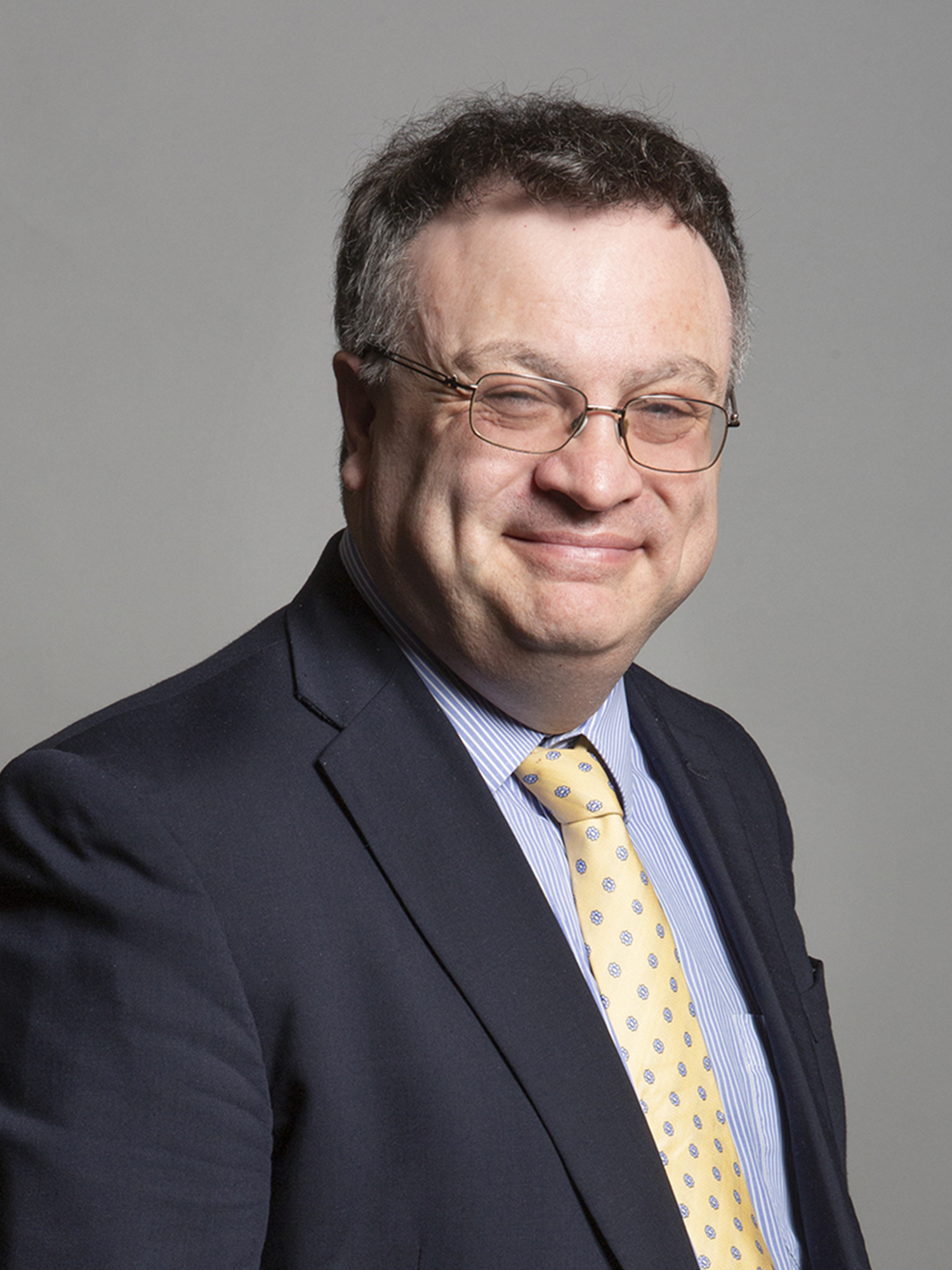
Stephen Farry, former MP

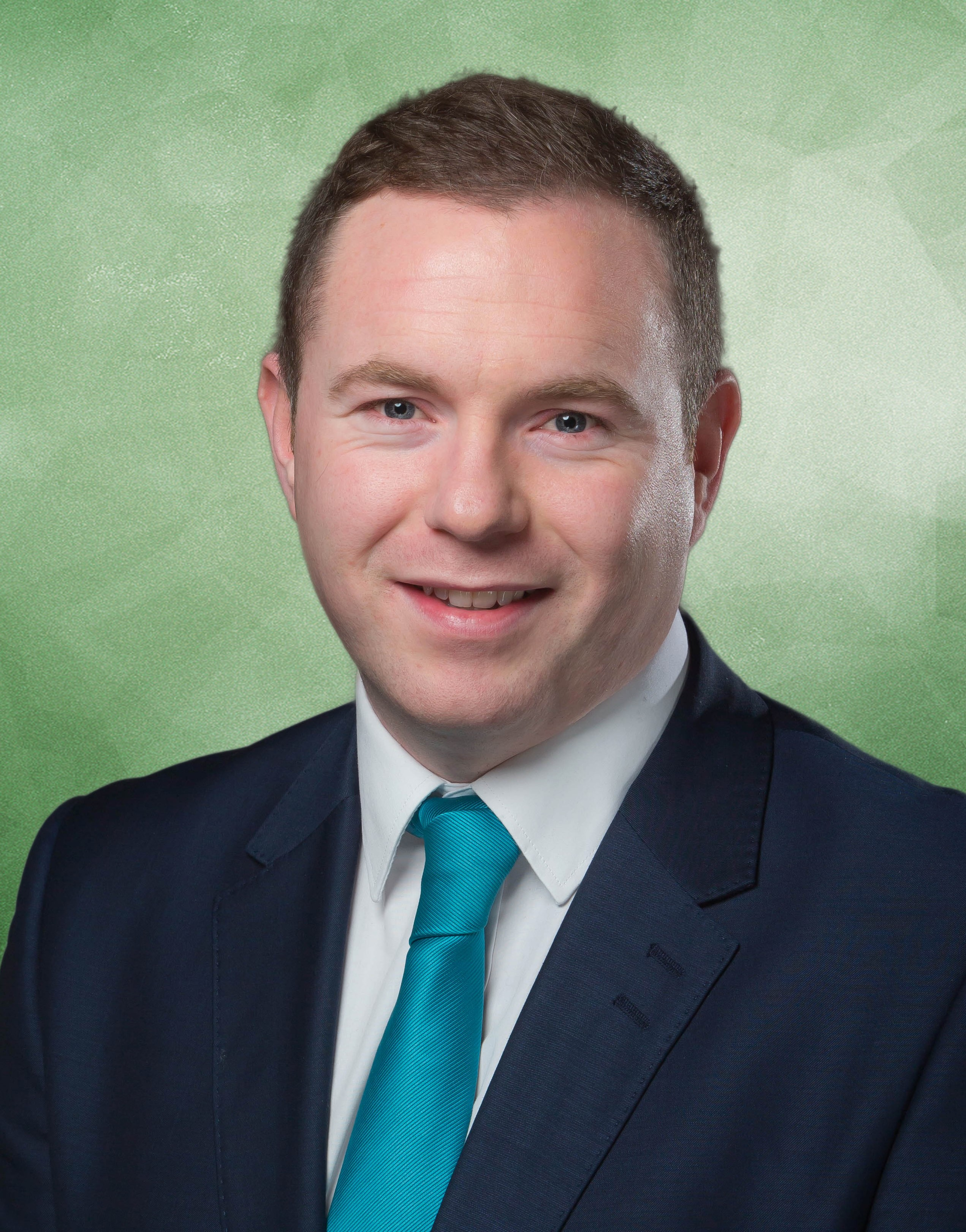
Chris Hazzard MP

- Davy Sims (born 1956), broadcaster and writer
- Hiram Morgan (born 1960), historian
- Miles McMullan (born 1967), aka Niall, author, naturalist and conservationist
- Stephen Farry (born 1971), former MP for North Down and Alliance Party Deputy leader from 2016-2024
- Mark Woods (born 1972), broadcaster and journalist
- Stephen Fitzpatrick (born 1977), founder of OVO Energy and owner of the Manor Racing team
- Chris Hazzard (born 1984), MP for South Down
- James Loughrey (born 1986), Gaelic footballer
- Niamh Perry (born 1990), singer
- Turlough Convery, actor
- Mark Bowen, lead guitarist, British post-punk band Idles
- Fionnuala (born 1990) and Máire Toner (born 1992), sisters who played for Northern Ireland national netball team

== See also ==
- List of secondary schools in Belfast
