= Miles McMullan =

Irish author, conversationist and naturalist

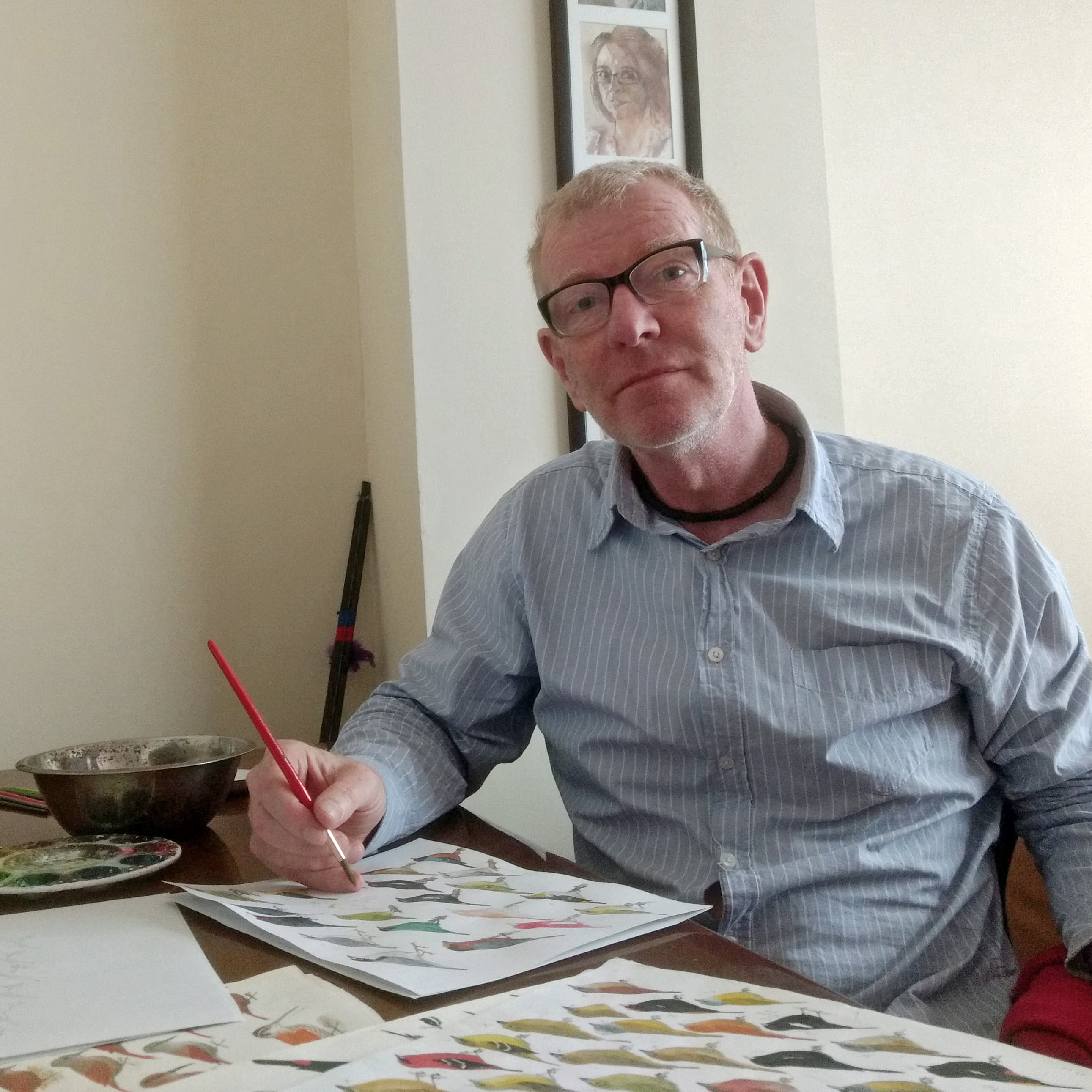
Author and Illustrator Miles McMullan in his Studio, 2020

Miles McMullan (born 1 August 1967 as William Niall McMullan in Bangor) is an author, illustrator, conservationist and naturalist from Northern Ireland, who has made innovative books on neotropical wildlife.

== Early life ==
McMullan studied at Our Lady and St. Patrick's College, Ulster University and Trinity College, Dublin. He worked as a prize-winning landscape and portrait painter in his early years. He qualified as an editor and worked for several years writing academic texts before concentrating in the wildlife field guides that he has made since 2008.

== Career as an author ==
McMullan has specialised in making nature guidebooks for the most diverse countries of tropical South American including Venezuela, Colombia and Ecuador, where he has also worked as a naturalist guide, birding tour guide and author. His influential guide to the birds of Colombia was named second best bird book of 2010, second only to the acclaimed Collins Birds of Europe, and Neotropical Bird Club named his guides among the 25 best books of the past 25 years, noting their concise treatment of very large avifaunas.

His Colombia book, with over 5000 illustrations and 2000 range distribution maps has been described as among the largest books ever made by a single author/illustrator. His books marked a divergence from the style used in previous national guidebooks. His North America book also has over 6000 illustrations and 2000 maps.

In March 2025, his Field Guide to the Birds of North America was published, with contributors Derek and Ryan Sallmann; it won a Kirkus Star and was selected by Kirkus Reviews as the best indie (independent) book for April 2025.

== Conservation and other work ==
McMullan has worked with a number of conservation organizations and foundations, especially in bird conservation in the tropical Americas. He is a devoted environmentalist and advocate of low-impact wildlife-watching – he has spoken in favor of more local birding as a more sustainable alternative, and voiced concerns about the impacts of the travel involved in global birding. He is involved with indigenous communities such as the Awá of southwestern Colombia and the conservation of their lands.

In August 2022 he received a special recognition of his work with women's groups in rural Colombia from the Ministry of Science of Colombia. He has also been recognised for his work with rural development programs.

He currently lives in Pasto, Colombia.

== Books ==
- Field Guide to the Birds of North America (2025)
- Arte de Pajaros, Pablo Neruda (author) and Miles McMullan (illustrator) (2024)
- Field Guide to the Birds of Colombia (2010, 2014, 2018)
- Aves de Cundinamarca (2023)
- Aves de Nariño (Birds of Nariño) (2023)
- Guia de Campo de Las Aves de Colombia (2011, 2021)
- Fieldbook of the Birds of Ecuador (2013, 2017)
- Field Guide to the Hummingbirds (2016)
- Field Guide to the Galapagos Islands (2017)
- Birds of the Colombian Andes (2019)
- Birds of Meta and the Colombian Llanos (2019)
- Guía de las Aves de la Reserva Natural Mesenia-Paramillo (2019)
- Birds of the Western Cordillera (2019)
- Birds and Common Mammals of Ecuadorian Amazon (2012)
- Birds of Northwest Ecuador (2009)
- Terrestrial Life of the Galapagos Islands (2007)
- Marine Life of the Galapagos Islands (2007)
