= 2017 All-Ireland Intermediate Ladies' Football Championship =

The 2017 All-Ireland Intermediate Ladies' Football Championship was a knock-out competition in the game of Ladies' Gaelic football played by women in Ireland. The series of games are organised by Ladies' Gaelic Football Association (Irish :Cumann Peil Gael na mBan)) and were played during the summer months with the All-Ireland Final being played on 24 September at Croke Park.

The competition was won by Tipperary who defeated Tyrone in the final by 1–13 to 1–10, Tipperary were captained by Samantha Lambert. It was the second time Tipperary had won the competition after also winning in 2008. The competition was sponsored by Lidl and TG4 with the final shown live on TG4.

== Quarter-finals ==
- Meath 3-15 Clare 4-11
- Tyrone 4-16 Leitrim 1-10
- Sligo 3-8 Roscommon 1-6
- Tipperary 2-15 Wexford 3-11

== Semi-finals ==
| 26 August 2017; 4:45 pm | Tipperary | 3-19 - 2-19 | Meath | Semple Stadium; Referee: Garryowen McMahon (Dublin); Man of the Match: Gillian O'Brien (Moyle Rovers) |
| 26 August 2017; 4:45 pm | Gillian O'Brien 1-7, Aishling Moloney 1-4, Orla O'Dwyer 1-3, Aisling McCarthy 0-2f, Mairead Morrissey, Roisin Howard, Caoimhe Condon 0-1 each | Report | Stacey Grimes 1-4 (1-0 pen, 0-3f), Marion Farrelly 1-2, Aoibhin Cleary 0-5, Niamh O'Sullivan 0-3, Emma Troy and Vikki Wall 0-2 each, Orla Byrne 0-1 | Semple Stadium; Referee: Garryowen McMahon (Dublin); Man of the Match: Gillian O'Brien (Moyle Rovers) |

| 2 September 2017; 3:00 pm | Tyrone | 1-16 - 0-11 | Sligo | Breffni Park; Referee: Brendan Rice (Down); Man of the Match: Meabh Mallon (Aodh Ruadh) |
| 2 September 2017; 3:00 pm | Niamh O'Neill 1-4 (0-1f), Gemma Begley (0-2f) and Grainne Rafferty 0-3 each, Neamh Woods, Meabh Mallon, Niamh Hughes, Maria Canavan (0-1f), Lycrecia Quinn, Emma Hegarty 0-1 each | Report | Ciara Gorman 0-5 (0-1f), Stephanie O'Reilly 0-2, Laura-Ann Laffey, Elaine O'Reilly, Nicola Brennan, Lisa Casey 0-1 each | Breffni Park; Referee: Brendan Rice (Down); Man of the Match: Meabh Mallon (Aodh Ruadh) |

== Final ==
| 24 September 2017; 1:45 pm Final | Tipperary | 1-13 - 1-10 | Tyrone | Croke Park, Dublin; Referee: Garryowen McMahon (Mayo); Man of the Match: Aisling McCarthy (Cahir) |
| 24 September 2017; 1:45 pm Final | Aisling McCarthy 1-4 (0-4f), Gillian O'Brien 0-4, Mairead Morrissry and Roisin Howard 0-2 each, Aishling Moloney 0-1 | Report | Gemma Begley 0-4 (0-3f), Grainne Rafferty 1-0, Emma Jane Gervin and Maria Canavan (0-2f), Niamh O'Neill and Chloe McCaffrey 0-1 each | Croke Park, Dublin; Referee: Garryowen McMahon (Mayo); Man of the Match: Aisling McCarthy (Cahir) |
