= Samantha Lambert =

Irish Gaelic footballer

Samantha Lambert is a Gaelic football player for Ardfinnan and formerly with the Tipperary ladies football team.

== Career ==
In 2017, Lambert captained the Tipperary Ladies football team to win the 2017 All-Ireland Intermediate Ladies' Football Championship, beating Tyrone in the final 1–13 to 1-10. Two years later she was the captain again as Tipperary won a second Intermediate title in three years with a 2–16 to 1–4 win against Meath in the final.

In January 2021, Lambert announced her retirement form inter-county football.

== Honours ==
=== Team ===
==== Tipperary ====
- All-Ireland Intermediate Ladies' Football Championship (3): 2008, 2017 (c), 2019 (c)
