= Leah Kennedy =

English netball player

Personal information
- Born: 11 February 1993 (age 33) Devon, England
- Height: 1.85 m (6 ft 1 in)
- Relative: Niall Kennedy
- University: Northumbria University

Netball career
- Playing positions: GD, GK
Years	Club team	Apps
2013–2017	Team Northumbria	
2018	Sirens Netball	
- (Correct as of 8 November 2018)
Years	National team	Caps
2016–Present	England	6

Leah Kennedy is an English netball player who has played for Team Northumbria and Sirens Netball in the Netball Superleague. Kennedy also played for the England Roses (2016-2018).

On 13 May 2016, Kennedy made her senior debut for England against Northern Ireland in the 2016 Netball Europe Open Championships. She also participated at the 2016 Fast5 Netball World Series.
