= Noleen Lennon =

Northern Ireland netball player

Personal information
- Full name: Noleen Armstrong (Née: Lennon)
- Born: 22 March 1984 (age 42) Bangor, County Down; Northern Ireland
- Height: 6 ft 2 in (1.88 m)
- Relative: Ciara Mageean
- University: Ulster University

Netball career
- Playing positions: GK, GS
Years	Club team	Apps
199x–20xx	Belfast Ladies	
2005–2006	→ Team Northumbria	
2014	→ Team Northumbria	
Years	National team	Caps
20xx–2019	Northern Ireland	

Noleen Lennon (born 22 March 1984), also known as Noleen Armstrong, is a former Northern Ireland netball international. She represented Northern Ireland at the 2003, 2011 and 2019 Netball World Cups and at the 2014 and 2018 Commonwealth Games. She was also a member of the Northern Ireland teams that were silver medallists at the 2012 and 2017 Netball Europe Open Championships. She captained Northern Ireland when they won the 2009 Nations Cup and then again at the 2011 World Netball Championships.

== Early life, family and education ==
Lennon is from Portaferry, County Down. She is a relative of Ciara Mageean, a track and field athlete who also represented Northern Ireland at the 2018 Commonwealth Games. While attending Ulster University, Lennon served as president of the university's sports union.

== Playing career ==
=== Clubs ===
==== Belfast Ladies ====
Lennon plays for Belfast Ladies in the Northern Ireland Premier League.

==== Team Northumbria ====
Lennon has played for Team Northumbria in the Netball Superleague. She initially played for Team Northumbria during the 2005–06 season. As part of their preparations for the 2014 Commonwealth Games, the Northern Ireland national netball team formed a partnership with Team Northumbria. This saw Lennon and six other Northern Ireland internationals – Oonagh McCullough, Fionnuala Toner, Caroline O'Hanlon, Gemma Gibney, Michelle Drayne and Niamh Cooper – play for Team Northumbria during the 2014 season.

=== Northern Ireland ===
Lennon represented Northern Ireland at the 2003, 2011 and 2019 Netball World Cups and at the 2014 and 2018 Commonwealth Games. She was also a member of the Northern Ireland teams that were silver medallists at the 2012 and 2017 Netball Europe Open Championships. She captained Northern Ireland when they won the 2009 Netball Singapore Nations Cup and then again at the 2011 World Netball Championships. Lennon initially retired after the 2018 Commonwealth Games but was recalled for the 2019 Netball World Cup as an injury replacement for Lisa Bowman who missed out due to serious ankle injury. In January 2018 she had helped Northern Ireland secure their place in the 2019 Netball World Cup with a player of the match performance against Wales during qualification tournament.

Tournaments	Place
2003 World Netball Championships	19th
2007 Netball Singapore Nations Cup	3rd place, bronze medalist(s)
2009 Netball Singapore Nations Cup	1st place, gold medalist(s)
2011 World Netball Championships	8th
2012 Netball Europe Open Championships	2nd place, silver medalist(s)
2014 Netball Europe Open Championships	3rd
2014 Commonwealth Games	7th
2017 Netball Europe Open Championships	2nd
2019 Netball World Cup Regional Qualifier – Europe	2nd
2018 Commonwealth Games	8th
2019 Netball World Cup	10th

== Other sports ==
Lennon has also played both basketball and ladies' Gaelic football at club level. Together with Fionnuala Toner, she was a member of the Ulster Rockets team that won Basketball Ireland's Women's National Cup in January 2011. She also played gaelic football for the Antrim GAA club, Glenavy.

== Honours ==
Northern Ireland

- Netball Singapore Nations Cup
  - Winners: 2009: 1
- Netball Europe Open Championships
  - Runner up: 2012, 2017: 2
