= Team Northumbria (netball) =

English netball team

- Based in: Newcastle upon Tyne
- Regions: North East England
- Home venue: Sport Central; Northumbria University
- League: Netball Superleague
Uniform

Team Northumbria is an English netball team based at Northumbria University. Between 2001 and 2005 they played in the Super Cup as Northern Flames. They also played as Team Northumbria Flames. Between 2005–06 and 2018, their senior team played in the Netball Superleague. The netball team is one of several sports teams based at Northumbria University that use the Team Northumbria brand name. Others include an association football team and a basketball team. In 2018 Northumbria University announced it was withdrawing seven of its national league sports teams due to cuts to its elite sport programme. This included Team Northumbria withdrawing from the Netball Superleague.

== History ==
=== Northern Flames ===
Between 2001 and 2005, Northern Flames, together with five other franchises – London Hurricanes, London Tornadoes, Team Bath Force, University of Birmingham Blaze and Northern Thunder – competed in the Super Cup. By 2005 Northern Flames had become Team Northumbria Flames.

=== Early Superleague seasons ===
In 2005 Team Northumbria were named as the North East England franchise in the new Netball Superleague. Together with Brunel Hurricanes, Celtic Dragons, Leeds Carnegie, Galleria Mavericks, Northern Thunder, Loughborough Lightning and Team Bath, Team Northumbria were founder members of the league. Team Northumbria's best performance in the Netball Superleague came in 2007–08 when, with a team that included Megan Hutton, they finished second during the regular season, behind Loughborough Lightning, and qualified for the play-offs. Future England national netball team manager, Tracey Neville began her senior coaching career with Team Northumbria when she served as head coach for the 2011 Netball Superleague season.

=== Northern Ireland ===
As part of their preparations for the 2014 Commonwealth Games, the Northern Ireland national netball team formed a partnership with Team Northumbria. This saw seven Northern Ireland internationals – Oonagh McCullough, Fionnuala Toner, Caroline O'Hanlon, Gemma Gibney, Michelle Drayne, Noleen Lennon and Niamh Cooper – play for Team Northumbria during the 2014 Netball Superleague season. With Kate Carpenter taking charge of both teams, Northern Ireland and Team Northumbria also shared a coach. Toner and O'Hanlon also played for Team Northumbria during the 2015 season.

=== Later years ===
Team Northumbria competed in the inaugural 2017 British Fast5 Netball All-Stars Championship. In July 2018 Northumbria University announced it was withdrawing seven of its national league sports teams due to cuts to its elite sport programme. This included Team Northumbria withdrawing from the Netball Superleague. London Pulse would subsequently replace them for the 2019 season. In addition to playing in the Netball Superleague, Team Northumbria has also represented Northumbria University in the Stan Calvert Cup. Team Northumbria continue to enter teams in intervarsity leagues organised by British Universities and Colleges Sport.

== Home venue ==
Northern Flames played their home games at Gateshead Leisure Centre. Team Northumbria plays its home games at Northumbria University's Sport Central.

== Notable former players ==
=== Internationals ===
England

- Ama Agbeze
- Leah Kennedy
- Olivia Murphy

Northern Ireland

- Lisa Bowman
- Niamh Cooper
- Michelle Drayne
- Gemma Gibney
- Noleen Lennon
- Oonagh McCullough
- Caroline O'Hanlon
- Fionnuala Toner

Australia Fast5

- Carla Dziwoki

Jamaica

- Shanice Beckford
- Nicole Dixon

New Zealand

- Belinda Colling

Scotland

- Hayley Mulheron

== Head coaches ==
Coach	Years
(England) Denise Egan	c. 2001–2008
(England) Tracey Neville	2011
(England) Lisa Stanley	2012
(New Zealand) Kate Carpenter	2014
(England) Lisa Stanley-Craig	2015
(New Zealand) Te Aroha Keenan	2015–2018
