= Kelly Boyle =

Scottish netball player (born 1996)

Personal information
- Born: 11 May 1996 (age 28)
- Height: 1.65 m (5 ft 5 in)
- Occupation: netball player

Netball career
- Playing position(s): wing attack, center

Kelly Boyle (born 11 May 1996) is a Scottish netball player who plays for Scotland and for Sirens Netball club in the positions of wing attack or center. She made her World Cup debut for Scotland during the 2019 Netball World Cup.

She studied at University of the West of Scotland, graduating with a BSc in Sport Coaching in 2018.
