= Gabby Marshall =

English netball player (born 1996)

Personal information
- Born: 9 April 1996 (age 30) England
- Height: 1.74 m (5 ft 9 in)

Netball career
- Playing positions: C; WD
Years	National team	Caps
2017	England national netball team	8

Gabriella (Gabby) Marshall is a former member of the England National Netball Team team who played centre for Manchester Thunder, London Mavericks, Severn Stars and Birmingham Panthers in the Netball superleague. Following her second concussion of the season, she announced her retirement from top-level netball in early May 2025.

== Netball career ==
Marshall was born on 9 April 1996. She attended Aquinas College, Stockport and then obtained a degree in physiotherapy from the Manchester Metropolitan University. She started to play netball at the age of five at the Oldham Netball Club, where her elder sister was already playing. She played for Oldham before joining the Manchester Thunder in the Superleague in 2013. In 2017 she joined the London Mavericks, when it was known as the Saracens Mavericks, but was released from the Mavericks five years later after surgery on both her ankles. This was followed by two years as captain at the Severn Stars, in which the team reached the league play-offs. For the 2025 season she joined the Birmingham Panthers.

Marshall won a gold medal in the 2015 Under-21 competition at the Netball Europe Open Championships and captained England to a bronze medal at the 2017 Netball World Youth Cup and to a gold medal at the 2017 Fast5 Netball World Series. In the same year she was selected for her first full cap for England, known as "The Roses", playing against Northern Ireland. She won eight caps in total.

In 2025 Marshall was concussed in the Birmingham Panthers opening game against Leeds Rhinos Netball on 14 March, which left her feeling nauseous for several days. She satisfactorily completed the necessary protocols to continue playing but when playing against London Pulse on 13 April she was again concussed when the back of her head banged against the court. Having had two other concussions earlier in her playing career she decided that it was time to stop playing, and announced her retirement in early May.

== Work career ==
Since February 2020 Marshall has worked on a self-employed basis with the Dame Kelly Holmes Trust, which was initially set up in 2008 by double Olympic champion Kelly Holmes to support retired athletes as they transition from sport. From September 2022 to July 2024 Marshall worked as a Personal Development & Lifestyle Advisor and between November 2023 and August 2024 as a Sport Industry Workforce Development Officer at the University of Worcester, where she has also worked for the university's Talented Athlete Scholarship Scheme. She has also done commentaries for Sky Sports.
