= Lauren Tait =

Scottish netball player (born 1996)

Personal information
- Nationality: Scottish
- Born: 10 August 1996 (age 28)

Sport
- Sport: Netball

Lauren Tait (born 10 August 1996) is a Scottish netball player. She was selected to represent the Scotland netball team at the 2019 Netball World Cup.
