= Sarah MacPhail =

Scottish netball player (born 1997)

Personal information
- Born: 8 August 1997 (age 27)
- Height: 1.78 m (5 ft 10 in)
- Occupation: netball player

Netball career
- Playing position(s): goal defense, wing defense, center

Sarah MacPhail (born 8 August 1997) is a Scottish netball player who plays for Scotland in the positions of goal defense, wing defense or center. She made her World Cup debut for Scotland during the 2019 Netball World Cup.
