= Episake Kahatoka =

Fijian netball player (born 1996)

Personal information
- Born: 14 May 1996 (age 30)
- Occupations: netball player, police officer
- Height: 1.90 m (6 ft 3 in)

Netball career
- Playing positions: goal defense, goal keeper

Episake Kahatoka (born 14 May 1996) is a Fijian netball player who plays for Fiji in the position of goal defense or goal keeper. She has featured in two World Cup tournaments representing Fiji in 2015 and in 2019.

She also represented Fiji at the 2018 Commonwealth Games, her maiden appearance at a Commonwealth Games event.
