= Lisa Bowman =

Northern Ireland netball player (born 1988)

Personal information
- Born: 2 November 1988 (age 37) Magherafelt, Northern Ireland
- University: Ulster University

Netball career
- Playing position: GS
| Years | Club team | Apps |
| Years | National team | Caps |

Lisa Bowman (born 2 November 1988) is a Northern Ireland netball international. She plays as a goal shooter. She plays for Team Northumbria in the Netball Superleague.

== Career ==
She received her maiden World Cup call during the 2011 World Netball Championships but she missed out due to maternity break. She was also a former Malcolm Brodie Player of the Year winner at the Belfast Telegraph Sports Awards.

She also represented Northern Ireland at the Commonwealth Games in 2014 and in 2018. She sustained a serious ankle injury during a training session two weeks prior to the start of the 2019 Netball World Cup and was ruled out of the tournament following medical testing. She was replaced by Noleen Lennon for the tournament.
