= Gail Parata =

New Zealand netball player and coach

Personal information
- Born: 26 November 1967 (age 58) Hāwera, New Zealand
- Occupation: Netball coach

Netball career
- Playing positions: WA, C
Years	National team	Caps
1996	New Zealand	1
Coaching career
- Years: Team
- 2009–2011 2012 2012 2013–2019 2017, 2019 2020–2021: Central Pulse (asst); Northern Mystics (asst); New Zealand (asst); Scotland; Strathclyde Sirens; Central Pulse

Gail Parata (born 26 November 1967) is a New Zealand netball coach and former player. She is currently a National netball selector for Netball NZ and the Technical Advisor to the Tifa Moana Samoan national netball team. She coached the Scotland national netball team from 2013 to 2019 where they qualified for two world cups and two Commonwealth Games. Under her leadership they achieved their highest world ranking of 7th position.

Parata was appointed head coach of the Central Pulse in the ANZ Premiership in September 2020 and had a disappointing season losing key players such as Burger, Metuarau, Temu to other franchaises and Ekenasio to pregnancy.

In 2020, Parata joined the NZ Silver Ferns coaching team as the Assistant to Dame Noeline Taurua for the Northern series in the United Kingdom. She was also the assistant coach with the NZ Silver Ferns in 2012 with Waimarama Taumaunu.

Parata played one game for New Zealand's national netball team, the Silver Ferns in 1996.

Of Māori heritage, Parata affiliates to Ngāruahine, Ngā Rauru, Ngāti Ruanui, Ngāi Tahu, Ngāti Toa and Te Atiawa ki Whakarongotai iwi.
