= Nicola McCleery =

Scottish netball player (born 1995)

Personal information
- Nationality: Scottish
- Born: 12 October 1995 (age 29)

Sport
- Sport: Netball

Nicola McCleery (born 12 October 1995) is a Scottish netball player. She was selected to represent the Scotland netball team at the 2019 Netball World Cup.
