= Ella Gibbons =

Scottish netball player (born 1994)

Personal information
- Full name: Ella Mhaire Gibbons
- Nationality: Scottish
- Born: 24 November 1994 (age 30)

Sport
- Sport: Netball

Ella Mhaire Gibbons (born 24 November 1994) is a Scottish netball player. She was selected to represent the Scotland netball team at the 2019 Netball World Cup.
