= Netball at the 2014 Commonwealth Games =

- Venues: SECC Precinct; SSE Hydro
- Location: Glasgow, Scotland
- Dates: 24 July – 3 August 2014
- Teams: 12

Medalists
gold medal	Australia
silver medal	New Zealand
bronze medal	Jamaica

Netball at the 2014 Commonwealth Games was the fifth appearance of Netball at the Commonwealth Games. The sport was one of ten core sports at the 2014 Commonwealth Games in Glasgow, Scotland. It was the fifth edition since its inclusion in 1998.

The competition took place between Thursday 24 July and Sunday 3 August; with preliminary and classification matches hosted at the SECC and the medal matches in the neighbouring Hydro Arena. Netball was one of only two women-only events in the 2014 competition schedule, the other being rhythmic gymnastics. Australia won the gold medal, defeating New Zealand in the final. Jamaica won the bronze medal.

== Participating nations ==
Twelve nations competed in netball at the 2014 Commonwealth Games:

- Scotland was included as the host nation for the Games;
- The top six teams from the IFNA World Rankings automatically qualified;
- The five remaining teams were selected through regional qualifying tournaments.

Africa	Americas	Asia	Europe	Oceania
Malawi; South Africa	Barbados; Jamaica; Saint Lucia; Trinidad and Tobago		England; Northern Ireland; Scotland (Hosts); Wales	Australia; New Zealand

== Umpires ==
- Rachael Ayre (AUS)
- Joshua Bowring (AUS)
- Jonathan Bredin (NZL)
- Gary Burgess (ENG)
- Ian Fuller (ENG)
- Sharon Kelly (AUS)
- Clare McCabe (AUS)
- Yvonne Morgan (NZL)
- Terrence Peart (JAM)
- Michelle Phippard (AUS)
- Theresa Prince (RSA)
- Tracy Smith (ENG)
- Marie-Louw Van Der Merve (RSA)

== Preliminary round ==
=== Pool A ===
Team	Pld	W	L	PF	PA	PD	Pts	Qualification
New Zealand	5	5	0	337	151	+186	10	Semi-finals
Jamaica	5	4	1	344	184	+160	8	Semi-finals
Malawi	5	3	2	299	244	+55	6	
Northern Ireland	5	2	3	211	286	−75	4	
Scotland	5	1	4	165	268	−103	2	
Saint Lucia	5	0	5	141	364	−223	0	

Source: glasgow2014.com

24 July 2014
11:30

Report
Malawi
71 – 50
Northern Ireland

SECC Precinct
Umpires:
Gary Burgess (ENG)
Rachael Ayre (AUS)
Reserve umpire:
Clare McCabe (AUS)
Chimaliro 6/7 (86%)
Kumwenda 44/47 (94%)
Simtowe 21/21 (100%)

Lennon 20/21 (95%)
McCullough 9/18 (50%)
Somerville 21/26 (81%)

24 July 2014
19:00

Report
Saint Lucia
24 – 88
Jamaica

SECC Precinct
Umpires:
Yvonne Morgan (NZL)
Sharon Kelly (AUS)
Reserve umpire:
Joshua Bowring (AUS)
Hippolyte 4/4 (100%)
Laurencin 9/13 (69%)
Maxwell 11/16 (69%)

Aiken 23/28 (82%)
Beckford 16/18 (89%)
Harwood 17/18 (94%)
Reid 32/35 (91%)

25 July 2014
09:30

Report
New Zealand
50 – 47
Malawi

SECC Precinct
Umpires:
Sharon Kelly (AUS)
Terrence Peart (JAM)
Reserve umpire:
Tracy Smith (ENG)
Brown 8/14 (57%)
Latu 30/31 (97%)
Tutaia 12/15 (80%)

Kumwenda 38/39 (97%)
Ngwira 0/1 (0%)
Simtowe 9/11 (82%)

25 July 2014
17:00

Report
Scotland
58 – 30
Saint Lucia

SECC Precinct
Umpires:
Theresa Prince (RSA)
Ian Fuller (ENG)
Reserve umpire:
Terrence Peart (JAM)
Gallagher 21/25 (84%)
MacDonald 22/27 (81%)
Pettitt 10/12 (83%)
Sole 5/6 (83%)

Hippolyte 0/4 (0%)
Laurencin 20/25 (80%)
Maxwell 10/16 (63%)

25 July 2014
19:00

Report
Jamaica
65 – 34
Northern Ireland

SECC Precinct
Umpires:
Tracy Smith (ENG)
Clare McCabe (AUS)
Reserve umpire:
Yvonne Morgan (NZL)
Beckford 12/16 (75%)
Harwood 4/7 (57%)
Reid 19/55 (35%)

Lennon 13/21 (62%)
McCullough 9/16 (56%)
Somerville 12/17 (71%)

26 July 2014
11:30

Report
Scotland
14 – 71
New Zealand

SECC Precinct
Umpires:
Tracy Smith (ENG)
Gary Burgess (ENG)
Reserve umpire:
Terrence Peart (JAM)
Gallagher 3/7 (43%)
MacDonald 1/3 (33%)
McNeill 0/2 (0%)
Pettitt 10/16 (63%)

Brown 14/22 (64%)
Halpenny 14/18 (78%)
Latu 30/31 (97%)
Tutaia 13/17 (76%)

26 July 2014
17:00

Report
Saint Lucia
28 – 69
Malawi

SECC Precinct
Umpires:
Michelle Phippard (AUS)
Marie-Louw Van Der Merve (RSA)
Reserve umpire:
Yvonne Morgan (NZL)
Altifois-Fenelon 2/3 (67%)
Hippolyte 9/13 (69%)
Laurencin 1/5 (20%)
Maxwell 16/28 (57%)

Kumwenda 42/49 (86%)
Mvula 12/14 (86%)
Simtowe 15/19 (79%)

27 July 2014
09:30

Report
Jamaica
68 – 26
Scotland

SECC Precinct
Umpires:
Theresa Prince (RSA)
Joshua Bowring (AUS)
Reserve umpire:
Gary Burgess (ENG)
Aiken 42/49 (86%)
Harwood 15/21 (71%)
Reid 11/14 (79%)

Gallagher 6/10 (60%)
MacDonald 12/17 (71%)
Pettitt 5/5 (100%)
Sole 3/5 (60%)

27 July 2014
19:00

Report
Northern Ireland
29 – 78
New Zealand

SECC Precinct
Umpires:
Michelle Phippard (AUS)
Marie-Louw van der Merve (RSA)
Reserve umpire:
Clare McCabe (AUS)
Lennon 17/22 (77%)
McCullough 5/14 (36%)
Somerville 7/9 (78%)

Brown 45/52 (87%)
Francois 0/1 (0%)
Latu 32/34 (94%)
Tutaia 1/2 (50%)

28 July 2014
17:00

Report
Northern Ireland
61 – 40
Saint Lucia

SECC Precinct
Umpires:
Terrence Peart (JAM)
Clare McCabe (AUS)
Reserve umpire:
Theresa Prince (RSA)
Lennon 35/38 (92%)
McCullough 14/20 (70%)
Somerville 11/14 (79%)

Altifois-Fenelon 7/12 (58%)
Laurencin 9/11 (82%)
Maxwell 24/32 (75%)
Toner 1/3 (33%)

28 July 2014
19:00

Report
Jamaica
81 – 50
Malawi

SECC Precinct
Umpires:
Michelle Phippard (AUS)
Joshua Bowring (AUS)
Reserve umpire:
Jonathan Bredin (NZL)
Aiken 24/27 (89%)
Harwood 2/4 (50%)
Reid 55/59 (93%)

Chimaliro 3/7 (43%)
Kumwenda 31/33 (94%)
Simtowe 16/25 (64%)

29 July 2014
11:30

Report
New Zealand
88 – 19
Saint Lucia

SECC Precinct
Umpires:
Theresa Prince (RSA)
Gary Burgess (ENG)
Reserve umpire:
Terrence Peart (JAM)
Brown 54/66 (82%)
Halpenny 15/18 (83%)
Leota 19/26 (73%)

Altifois-Fenelon 1/1 (100%)
Hippolyte 4/5 (80%)
Laurencin 1/1 (100%)
Maxwell 13/21 (62%)

29 July 2014
19:00

Report
Malawi
62 – 35
Scotland

SECC Precinct
Umpires:
Jonathan Bredin (NZL)
Rachael Ayre (AUS)
Reserve umpire:
Michelle Phippard (AUS)
Kumwenda 40/18 (222%)
Simtowe 22/25 (88%)

Gallagher 13/16 (81%)
MacDonald 11/14 (79%)
Pettitt 6/10 (60%)
Sole 5/8 (63%)

30 July 2014
11:30

Report
New Zealand
50 – 42
Jamaica

SECC Precinct
Umpires:
Sharon Kelly (AUS)
Michelle Phippard (AUS)
Reserve umpire:
Clare McCabe (AUS)
Brown 29/41 (71%)
Halpenny 21/28 (75%)

Beckford 7/8 (88%)
Reid 35/39 (90%)

30 July 2014
17:00

Report
Scotland
32 – 37
Northern Ireland

SECC Precinct
Umpires:
Rachael Ayre (AUS)
Joshua Bowring (AUS)
Reserve umpire:
Tracy Smith (ENG)
Gallagher 19/24 (79%)
MacDonald 13/16 (81%)
Pettitt 0/1 (0%)

Lennon 32/48 (67%)
McCullough 5/10 (50%)

=== Pool B ===
Team	Pld	W	L	PF	PA	PD	Pts	Qualification
Australia	5	5	0	322	185	+137	10	Semi-finals
England	5	4	1	293	160	+133	8	Semi-finals
South Africa	5	3	2	249	222	+27	6	
Wales	5	2	3	199	255	−56	4	
Trinidad and Tobago	5	1	4	167	282	−115	2	
Barbados	5	0	5	162	288	−126	0	

Source: glasgow2014.com

24 July 2014
13:30

Report
Australia
63 – 36
Wales

SECC Precinct
Umpires:
Ian Fuller (ENG)
Terrence Peart (JAM)
Reserve umpire:
Marie-Louw Van Der Merve (RSA)
Bassett 24/28 (86%)
Caldwell 12/15 (80%)
Medhurst 8/11 (73%)
Thwaits 19/23 (83%)

James 8/11 (73%)
Lewis 24/35 (69%)
Moseley 4/7 (57%)

24 July 2014
17:00

Report
Trinidad and Tobago
38 – 37
Barbados

SECC Precinct
Umpires:
Jonathan Bredin (NZL)
Michelle Phippard (AUS)
Reserve umpire:
Theresa Prince (RSA)
Barker 4/5 (80%)
Cooper 16/21 (76%)
McCollin 18/21 (86%)

Browne 8/8 (100%)
Piggott 7/11 (64%)
Thomas 19/26 (73%)
Wharton 3/6 (50%)

25 July 2014
11:30

Report
England
65 – 25
Wales

SECC Precinct
Umpires:
Marie-Louw Van Der Merve (RSA)
Joshua Bowring (AUS)
Reserve umpire:
Michelle Phippard (AUS)
Corbin 7/10 (70%)
Dunn 20/22 (91%)
Harten 33/43 (77%)
Housby 5/9 (56%)

James 11/16 (69%)
Lewis 5/10 (50%)
Moseley 9/15 (60%)
Thomas 0/4 (0%)

25 July 2014
15:00

Report
South Africa
56 – 40
Trinidad and Tobago

SECC Precinct
Umpires:
Gary Burgess (ENG)
Rachael Ayre (AUS)
Reserve umpire:
Jonathan Bredin (NZL)
Bootha 8/10 (80%)
Holtzhausen 8/10 (80%)
Myburgh 14/20 (70%)
Potgieter 26/31 (84%)

Cooper 15/17 (88%)
McCollin 10/11 (91%)
Wilson 15/17 (88%)

26 July 2014
09:30

Report
Australia
49 – 48
England

SECC Precinct
Umpires:
Yvonne Morgan (NZL)
Jonathan Bredin (NZL)
Reserve umpire:
Marie-Louw Van Der Merve (RSA)
Bassett 36/52 (69%)
Caldwell 2/5 (40%)
Medhurst 11/13 (85%)

Corbin 19/24 (79%)
Harten 29/37 (78%)

26 July 2014
15:00

Report
South Africa
57 – 36
Barbados

SECC Precinct
Umpires:
Sharon Kelly (AUS)
Joshua Bowring (AUS)
Reserve umpire:
Rachael Ayre (AUS)
Bootha 20/25 (80%)
Holtzhausen 11/12 (92%)
Myburgh 9/12 (75%)
Potgieter 17/19 (89%)

Browne 23/27 (85%)
Piggott 11/20 (55%)
Thomas 2/3 (67%)

26 July 2014
19:00

Report
Wales
56 – 31
Trinidad and Tobago

SECC Precinct
Umpires:
Tracy Smith (ENG)
Clare McCabe (AUS)
Reserve umpire:
Ian Fuller (ENG)
James 12/19 (63%)
Lewis 31/40 (78%)
Moseley 7/9 (78%)

Barker 1/2 (50%)
Cooper 5/7 (71%)
McCollin 13/15 (87%)
Wilson 12/19 (63%)

27 July 2014
11:30

Report
Barbados
27 – 77
Australia

SECC Precinct
Umpires:
Jonathan Bredin (NZL)
Ian Fuller (ENG)
Reserve umpire:
Tracy Smith (ENG)
Browne 6/7 (86%)
Piggott 2/4 (50%)
Thomas 8/11 (73%)
Wharton 11/12 (92%)

Caldwell 35/39 (90%)
Thwaits 42/50 (84%)

27 July 2014
17:00

Report
England
41 – 35
South Africa

SECC Precinct
Umpires:
Rachael Ayre (AUS)
Terrence Peart (JAM)
Reserve umpire:
Yvonne Morgan (NZL)
Corbin 5/10 (50%)
Dunn 16/18 (89%)
Harten 20/29 (69%)

Bootha 27/32 (84%)
Holtzhausen 8/15 (53%)
Myburgh 2/3 (67%)

28 July 2014
09:30

Report
Wales
47 – 35
Barbados

SECC Precinct
Umpires:
Sharon Kelly (AUS)
Gary Burgess (ENG)
Reserve umpire:
Marie-Louw Van Der Merve (RSA)
James 7/10 (70%)
Lewis 21/30 (70%)
Moseley 19/29 (66%)

Browne 21/27 (78%)
Thomas 14/20 (70%)

28 July 2014
11:30

Report
Trinidad and Tobago
34 – 69
Australia

SECC Precinct
Umpires:
Tracy Smith (ENG)
Yvonne Morgan (NZL)
Reserve umpire:
Ian Fuller (ENG)
Cooper 15/24 (63%)
McCollin 10/15 (67%)
Wilson 9/13 (69%)

Bassett 21/23 (91%)
Caldwell 17/20 (85%)
Medhurst 10/14 (71%)
Thwaits 21/23 (91%)

29 July 2014
09:30

Report
England
70 – 24
Trinidad and Tobago

SECC Precinct
Umpires:
Marie-Louw Van Der Merve (RSA)
Clare McCabe (AUS)
Reserve umpire:
Yvonne Morgan (NZL)
Corbin 16/19 (84%)
Dunn 8/10 (80%)
Harten 35/43 (81%)
Housby 11/12 (92%)

Cooper 13/16 (81%)
McCollin 4/6 (67%)
Wilson 7/11 (64%)

29 July 2014
17:00

Report
South Africa
61 – 41
Wales

SECC Precinct
Umpires:
Sharon Kelly (AUS)
Ian Fuller (ENG)
Reserve umpire:
Tracy Smith (ENG)
Holtzhausen 5/8 (63%)
Myburgh 8/13 (62%)
Potgieter 48/54 (89%)

James 16/24 (67%)
Lewis 16/24 (67%)
Moseley 3/5 (60%)
Thomas 6/7 (86%)

30 July 2014
09:30

Report
Australia
64 – 40
South Africa

SECC Precinct
Umpires:
Jonathan Bredin (NZL)
Ian Fuller (ENG)
Reserve umpire:
Gary Burgess (ENG)
Bassett 30/33 (91%)
Caldwell 7/10 (70%)
Medhurst 21/23 (91%)
Thwaits 6/6 (100%)

Bootha 4/8 (50%)
Holtzhausen 8/8 (100%)
Myburgh 2/3 (67%)
Potgieter 26/29 (90%)

30 July 2014
19:00

Report
Barbados
27 – 69
England

SECC Precinct
Umpires:
Yvonne Morgan (NZL)
Terrence Peart (JAM)
Reserve umpire:
Theresa Prince (RSA)
Browne 4/6 (67%)
Piggott 17/23 (74%)
Thomas 1/6 (17%)
Wharton 5/6 (83%)

Dunn 25/30 (83%)
Harten 33/36 (92%)
Housby 11/12 (92%)

== Classification matches ==
=== Eleventh place match ===
31 July 2014
17:00

Report
Saint Lucia
27 – 53
Barbados

SECC Precinct
Umpires:
Gary Burgess (ENG)
Rachael Ayre (AUS)
Reserve umpire:
Tracy Smith (ENG)
Altifois-Fenelon 2/3 (67%)
Hippolyte 9/14 (64%)
Maxwell 16/24 (67%)

Piggott 6/12 (50%)
Thomas 6/10 (60%)
Wharton 41/45 (91%)

=== Ninth place match ===
31 July 2014
19:15

Report
Scotland
46 – 28
Trinidad and Tobago

SECC Precinct
Umpires:
Terrence Peart (JAM)
Clare McCabe (AUS)
Reserve umpire:
Theresa Prince (RSA)
Gallagher 22/29 (76%)
MacDonald 16/20 (80%)
Pettitt 3/6 (50%)
Sole 5/5 (100%)

Barker 11/11 (100%)
McCollin 7/8 (88%)
Wilson 10/13 (77%)

=== Seventh place match ===
1 August 2014
09:30

Report
Northern Ireland
58 – 36
Wales

SECC Precinct
Umpires:
Yvonne Morgan (NZL)
Michelle Phippard (AUS)
Reserve umpire:
Marie-Louw Van Der Merve (RSA)
McCullough 12/17 (71%)
Somerville 46/53 (87%)

James 7/9 (78%)
Lewis 21/27 (78%)
Moseley 7/14 (50%)
Thomas 1/3 (33%)

=== Fifth place match ===
1 August 2014
11:45

Report
Malawi
53 – 45
South Africa

SECC Precinct
Umpires:
Ian Fuller (ENG)
Joshua Bowring (AUS)
Reserve umpire:
Jonathan Bredin (NZL)
Kumwenda 35/39 (90%)
Simtowe 18/20 (90%)

Bootha 19/23 (83%)
Holtzhausen 15/15 (100%)
Potgieter 22/31 (71%)

== Medal round ==
Semi-finals
2 August 2014
New Zealand	35
England	34
2 August 2014
Australia	57
Jamaica	42

Gold medal match
3 August 2014
New Zealand	40
Australia	58
Bronze medal match
3 August 2014
England	48
Jamaica	52

=== Semi-finals ===
2 August 2014
10:00

Report
New Zealand
35 – 34
England

SECC Precinct
Umpires:
Sharon Kelly (AUS)
Michelle Phippard (AUS)
Reserve umpire:
Rachael Ayre (AUS)
Brown 16/20 (80%)
Halpenny 4/6 (67%)
Tutaia 15/25 (60%)

K. Corbin 14/22 (64%)
Harten 20/25 (80%)

2 August 2014
12:15

Report
Australia
57 – 42
Jamaica

SECC Precinct
Umpires:
Jonathan Bredin (NZL)
Ian Fuller (ENG)
Reserve umpire:
Gary Burgess (ENG)
Bassett 41/51 (80%)
Medhurst 16/18 (89%)

Beckford 10/13 (77%)
Reid 32/37 (86%)

=== Bronze medal match ===
3 August 2014
10:00

Report
England
48 – 52
Jamaica (bronze)

SSE Hydro
Umpires:
Jonathan Bredin (NZL)
Sharon Kelly (AUS)
Reserve umpire:
Michelle Phippard (AUS)
Corbin 22/26 (85%)
Harten 26/29 (90%)

Aiken 44/52 (85%)
Beckford 8/15 (53%)

=== Gold medal match ===
3 August 2014
12:30

Report
(silver) New Zealand
40 – 58
Australia (gold)

SSE Hydro
Umpires:
Ian Fuller (ENG)
Gary Burgess (ENG)
Reserve umpire:
Terrence Peart (JAM)
Brown 11/16 (69%)
Latu 7/7 (100%)
Tutaia 22/31 (71%)

Bassett 49/53 (92%)
Medhurst 9/11 (82%)

== Final standings ==
Place	Nation
Gold	Australia
Silver	New Zealand
Bronze	Jamaica
4	England
5	Malawi
6	South Africa
7	Northern Ireland
8	Wales
9	Scotland
10	Trinidad and Tobago
11	Barbados
12	Saint Lucia

== Medallists ==
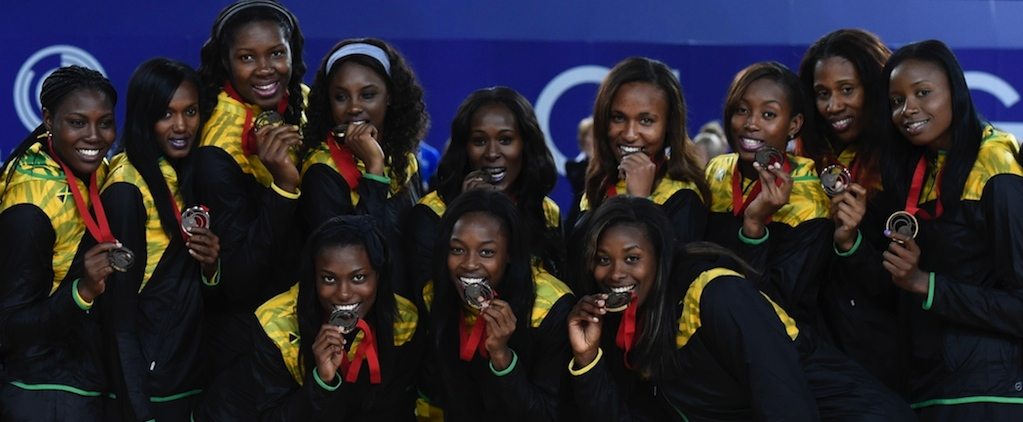
Jamaica, the 2014 Commonwealth Games bronze medallists.

Gold	Silver	Bronze
Australia; Coach: Lisa Alexander	New Zealand; Coach: Wai Taumaunu	Jamaica; Coach: Minneth Reynolds
Caitlin Thwaites; Caitlin Bassett; Madison Robinson; Tegan Caldwell; Bianca Chatfield; Laura Geitz; Julie Corletto; Kimberlee Green; Renae Hallinan; Sharni Layton; Natalie Medhurst; Kim Ravaillion	Liana Leota; Jodi Brown; Leana de Bruin; Shannon Francois; Katrina Grant; Ellen Halpenny; Anna Harrison; Joline Henry; Casey Kopua; Laura Langman; Cathrine Latu; Maria Tutaia	Romelda Aiken; Nicole Aiken-Pinnock (c); Shanice Beckford; Stacian Facey; Jhaniele Reid; Thristina Harwood; Sasher-Gaye Henry; Malysha Kelly; Khadijah Williams; Paula Thompson; Vangelee Williams; Kasey Evering

2014 Commonwealth champions

Australia
Third title
