= Northern Ireland national netball team =

National netball team

Northern Ireland
- Nickname(s): Warriors
- Association: Netball Northern Ireland
- Confederation: Europe Netball
- Head coach: Sheonah Forbes
- Asst coach: Shaunagh Craig
- Manager: Laura Lovett
- Captain: Michelle Magee
- Vice-captain: Caroline O'Hanlon
- World ranking: 14th
Team colours

Netball World Cup
- Appearances: 12 (Debuted in 1963)
- 2019 placing: 10th
- Best result: 7th (1983)

Commonwealth Games
- Appearances: 3 (Debuted in 2014)
- 2022 placing: 10th
- Best result: 7th (2014)

The Northern Ireland national netball team, referred to as the Northern Ireland Warriors, represents Netball Northern Ireland in international netball tournaments such as the Netball World Cup, the Netball at the Commonwealth Games and the Netball Europe Open Championships. Northern Ireland have won the 2009 and 2015 Netball Singapore Nations Cups. As of 1 December 2025, Northern Ireland are listed 14th on the World Netball Rankings.

== Early tests ==
The Northern Ireland national netball team has been active since the early 1950s. On 12 May 1951, when Scotland hosted their first home international, they defeated Northern Ireland 21–7 in Glasgow. Northern Ireland shooter, Peggy Curran, injured her ligaments in the first five minutes of the match and had to be flown home. On 31 October 1953, Northern Ireland hosted Scotland for the first time, losing 19–10. During the 1950s, Northern Ireland played Scotland six times. In 1954, Northern Ireland played England for the first time.

== Tournament history ==
=== Major tournaments ===
==== Netball World Cup ====
Northern Ireland played in the inaugural 1963 World Netball Tournament and finished in 11th place. Their best performance in the tournament came in 1983 when they finished seventh. In 2019 Northern Ireland played in their twelfth Netball World Cup.

Tournaments	Place
1963 World Netball Tournament	11th
1971 World Netball Tournament	8th
1975 World Netball Tournament	9th
1979 World Netball Tournament	17th
1983 World Netball Tournament	7th
1987 World Netball Tournament	10th
1991 World Netball Championships	12th
1995 World Netball Championships	18th
1999 World Netball Championships	16th
2003 World Netball Championships	19th
2011 World Netball Championships	8th
2019 Netball World Cup	10th

==== Commonwealth Games ====
In 2014, Northern Ireland made their debut at the Commonwealth Games. As part of their preparations for the 2014 Commonwealth Games, Northern Ireland formed a partnership with Team Northumbria. This saw seven Northern Ireland internationals – Oonagh McCullough, Fionnuala Toner, Caroline O'Hanlon, Gemma Gibney, Michelle Drayne, Noleen Lennon and Niamh Cooper – play for Team Northumbria during the 2014 Netball Superleague season. With Kate Carpenter taking charge of both teams, Northern Ireland and Team Northumbria also shared a coach. In the tournament itself, they eventually finished seventh after defeating Wales by 58–36 in a classification match. Northern Ireland made their second appearance at the Commonwealth Games in 2018. Team captain, Caroline O'Hanlon, carried the flag of Northern Ireland during the 2018 Commonwealth Games Parade of Nations. Northern Ireland eventually finished eighth after losing to Malawi by 60–52 in a classification match.

Tournaments	Place
2014 Commonwealth Games	7th
2018 Commonwealth Games	8th
2022 Commonwealth Games	10th
2026 Commonwealth Games	

==== World Games ====
Tournaments	Place
1985 World Games	6th

==== World University Netball Championship ====
Northern Ireland represented the Colleges and Universities Sports Association of Ireland at the 2012 World University Netball Championship. It was initially planned that Ireland would send an All-Ireland team, featuring players from both Northern Ireland and the Republic of Ireland. However no players from the Republic were selected for the final squad. As a result, it was a Northern Ireland team, in effect, that competed in the tournament.

Tournaments	Place
2012 World University Netball Championship	4th

=== European tournaments ===
==== Netball World Cup Qualifiers ====
Tournaments	Place
2007 World Netball Championships Qualifier – Europe	3rd
2011 World Netball Championships Qualifier – Europe	1st
2014 Netball Europe Open Championships	3rd
2019 Netball World Cup Regional Qualifier – Europe	2nd
2023 Netball World Cup Regional Qualifier – Europe	3rd

==== Netball Europe Open Championships ====
Northern Ireland have played regularly in the Netball Europe Open Championships. Their best performances came in 2012 and 2017 when they finished second and won silver medals on both occasions.

Tournaments	Place
1998 FENA Open	
1999 FENA Open	
2000 FENA Open	
2001 FENA Open	
2002 FENA Open	
2003 FENA Open	
2004 FENA Open	
2005 FENA Open	
2006 FENA Open	
2007 FENA Open	4th
2008 FENA Open	3rd
2009 Netball Europe Open Championships	3rd
2010 Netball Europe Open Championships	4th
2011 Netball Europe Open Championships	3rd
2012 Netball Europe Open Championships	2th
2013 Netball Europe Open Championships	3rd
2014 Netball Europe Open Championships	3rd
2015 Netball Europe Open Championships	4th
2016 Netball Europe Open Championships	4th
2017 Netball Europe Open Championships	2th
2019 Netball Europe Open Championships	3rd

==== Europe Netball Open Challenge ====
Tournaments	Place
2024 Europe Netball Open Challenge	1st

=== Invitational tournaments ===
==== Celtic Cup ====
The Celtic Cup series is hosted and organised by Netball Northern Ireland, Netball Scotland and Wales Netball. The series features Northern Ireland, Scotland and Wales playing a series of test matches against each other and visiting national teams.

Tournaments	Place
2024 Celtic Cup	4th
2025 Celtic Cup	6th

==== Netball Singapore Nations Cup ====
Northern Ireland won the Netball Singapore Nations Cup in both 2009 and 2015

Tournaments	Place
2007 Netball Singapore Nations Cup	3rd place, bronze medalist(s)
2009 Netball Singapore Nations Cup	1st place, gold medalist(s)
2015 Netball Singapore Nations Cup	1st place, gold medalist(s)

== Notable players ==
=== Current squad ===
Northern Ireland – 2025 Celtic Cup roster
Players
Coaches

Name	Pos	DOB	Height	Club	Nat	Caps
Lisa Carlin	GD, GK		–	Oaksway	(England)
Niamh Cooper	WA, C, WD	29 July 1992 (aged 33)	1.74 m (5 ft 9 in)	Nottingham Forest	(England)
Ciara Crosbie	GS, GA	17 July 1994 (aged 31)	1.80 m (5 ft 11 in)	Tameside	(England)
Emilia Gordon	GS, GA		–	Crumlin	(Northern Ireland)
Frances Keenan	WA, C, WD		–	Belfast Ladies	(Northern Ireland)
Emma Magee	WA, GA, GS	11 November 1997 (aged 28)	1.76 m (5 ft 9 in)	GMR Majors	(New Zealand)
Michelle Magee (c)	WD, GD	13 January 2000 (aged 25)	1.80 m (5 ft 11 in)	Birmingham Panthers	(England)
Evelyn McCagherty	WA, C, WD		–	Nottingham Forest	(England)
Maria McCann	GD, GK		–	Belfast Ladies	(Northern Ireland)
Georgie McGrath	GA, GS		–	Kingsway	(Northern Ireland)
Orla McGeough	WA, C, WD		–	Tameside	(England)
Ana Mulholland	WA, C, WD		–	Crumlin Community	(Northern Ireland)
Caroline O'Hanlon (vc)	C, WA	8 August 1984 (aged 41)	1.74 m (5 ft 9 in)	Larkfield	(Northern Ireland)
Orlaith Rogers	GA, GS		–	Leeds Rhinos	(England)
Lauren Walshe	GD, GK		–	Belfast Ladies	(Northern Ireland)

Head coach

- Sheonah Forbes

Assistant coach

- Shaunagh Craig

Manager: Laura Lovett
Physiotherapist: Sinead Chambers
Performance Analyst: Lauren Webb

Notes

- (c) – Captain
- (cc) – Co-captain
- (vc) – Vice-captain
- – Injury / maternity leave
- (TRP) – Temporary Replacement Player

=== Captains ===
Captains	Years
Pamela Lockett	1963
June Wightman	1975
Sheelagh O'Prey	1979
Elizabeth Rodgers	1983–1991
Jennifer Bradley	1999
Noleen Lennon	2009–2011
Gemma Gibney	2012–2016
Hannah Willis	2014
Caroline O'Hanlon	2016–
Fionnuala Toner	2024–
Michelle Magee	2025–

== Head coaches ==
Coach	Years
Doreen Dutton	1971
Maureen Mawhinney	1975, 1979
Mary French	1983
Mary Hicks	1987, 1991
Ann Anderson	1995
Marian Lofthouse	1999
Gill Mason	2003
Elaine Rice	2008–2011
Jill McIntosh	2012
Kate Carpenter	2013–2015
Elaine Rice	2015
Julie Kimber	2015
Elaine Rice	2016–2018
Dan Ryan	2018–2021
Elaine Rice	2021–2022
Sheonah Forbes	2023–

== Honours ==
- Europe Netball Open Challenge
  - Winners: 2024
- Netball World Cup Qualifiers
  - Winners: 2011
- Netball Singapore Nations Cup
  - Winners: 2009, 2015
- Netball Europe Open Championships
  - Runner up: 2012, 2017
