= Uganda at the 2018 Commonwealth Games =

- Flag of Uganda
- CG code: UGA
- CGA: Uganda Olympic Committee
- Website: nocuganda.com

in Gold Coast, Australia 4 April 2018 – 15 April 2018
- Competitors: 69 in 11 sports
- Flag bearer: Peace Proscovia (opening)
- Medals Ranked 15th: Gold 3 Silver 1 Bronze 2 Total 6

Commonwealth Games appearances (overview)
- 1954; 1958; 1962; 1966; 1970; 1974; 1978; 1982; 1986; 1990; 1994; 1998; 2002; 2006; 2010; 2014; 2018; 2022; 2026; 2030

Uganda competed at the 2018 Commonwealth Games in the Gold Coast, Australia from April 4 to April 15, 2018.

Netball player Peace Proscovia was the country's flag bearer during the opening ceremony.

== Medalists ==
| Medal | Name | Sport | Event | Date |
|---|---|---|---|---|
| Gold | Joshua Kiprui Cheptegei | Athletics | Men's 5000m | April 8 |
| Gold | Stella Chesang | Athletics | Women's 10000m | April 9 |
| Gold | Joshua Kiprui Cheptegei | Athletics | Men's 10000 m | April 13 |
| Silver | Munyo Mutai | Athletics | Men's marathon | April 15 |
| Bronze | Mercyline Chelangat | Athletics | Women's 10000m | April 9 |
| Bronze | Juma Miiro | Boxing | Men's −49 kg | April 14 |

== Competitors ==
The following is the list of number of competitors participating at the Games per sport/discipline.

| Sport | Men | Women | Total |
|---|---|---|---|
| Athletics | 13 | 10 | 23 |
| Badminton | 2 | 2 | 4 |
| Boxing | 5 | 0 | 5 |
| Cycling | 2 | 0 | 2 |
| Netball | 0 | 12 | 12 |
| Rugby sevens | 12 | 0 | 12 |
| Shooting | 0 | 1 | 1 |
| Squash | 2 | 0 | 2 |
| Swimming | 1 | 1 | 2 |
| Table tennis | 1 | 1 | 2 |
| Weightlifting | 3 | 1 | 4 |
| Total | 41 | 28 | 69 |

== Athletics ==
Men
Track & road events

| Athlete | Event | Heat | | Semifinal | | Final | |
| Athlete | Event | Result | Rank | Result | Rank | Result | Rank |
|---|---|---|---|---|---|---|---|
| Pius Adome | 100 m | 10.70 | 5 | Did not advance | | | |
| Pius Adome | 200 m | 21.39 | 4 | Did not advance | | | |
| Alli Ngaimoko | 400 m | 50.35 | 7 | Did not advance | | | |
| Leonard Opiny | 400 m | 47.32 | 4 | Did not advance | | | |
| Ronald Musagala | 1500 m | 3:48.62 | 6 | —N/a | | Did not advance | |
| Thomas Ayeko | 5000 m | —N/a | | | | 13:54.78 | 4 |
| Joshua Kiprui Cheptegei | 5000 m | —N/a | | | | 13:50.83 | 1st place, gold medalist(s) |
| Phillip Kipyego | 5000 m | —N/a | | | | 13:59.59 | 6 |
| Joshua Kiprui Cheptegei | 10000 m | —N/a | | | | 27:19.62 | 1st place, gold medalist(s) |
| Jacob Kiplimo | 10000 m | —N/a | | | | 27:30.25 | 4 |
| Timothy Toroitich | 10000 m | —N/a | | | | 27:47.35 | 7 |
| Albert Chemutai | 3000 m steeplechase | —N/a | | | | 8:19.89 | 5 |
| Robert Chemonges | Marathon | —N/a | | | | Did not finish | |
| Alex Chesakit | Marathon | —N/a | | | | 2:23:06 | 7 |
| Munyo Solomon Mutai | Marathon | —N/a | | | | 2:19:02 | 2nd place, silver medalist(s) |

Women
Track & road events

| Athlete | Event | Heat | | Semifinal | | Final | |
| Athlete | Event | Result | Rank | Result | Rank | Result | Rank |
|---|---|---|---|---|---|---|---|
| Scovia Ayikoru | 100 m | 11.86 | 4 q | 11.99 | 8 | Did not advance | |
| Scovia Ayikoru | 400 m | 54.65 | 7 | Did not advance | | | |
| Emily Nanziri | 400 m | 54.10 | 4 Q | 54.10 | 6 | Did not advance | |
| Leni Shida | 400 m | 52.79 | 4 Q | 54.50 | 8 | Did not advance | |
| Docus Ajok | 800 m | 2:00.53 | 4 q | —N/a | | 2:01.22 | 6 |
| Halima Nakaayi | 800 m | 2:01.69 | 5 | —N/a | | Did not advance | |
| Winnie Nanyondo | 800 m | 2:00.69 | 2 Q | —N/a | | 2:00.36 | 4 |
| Winnie Nanyondo | 1500 m | 4:08.49 | 2 Q | —N/a | | 4:06.05 | 10 |
| Juliet Chekwel | 5000 m | —N/a | | | | 15:30.17 | 4 |
| Mercyline Chelangat | 5000 m | —N/a | | | | 15:50.01 | 11 |
| Juliet Chekwel | 10000 m | —N/a | | | | 31:57.97 | 7 |
| Mercyline Chelangat | 10000 m | —N/a | | | | 31:48.41 | 3rd place, bronze medalist(s) |
| Stella Chesang | 10000 m | —N/a | | | | 31:45.30 | 1st place, gold medalist(s) |
| Scovia Ayikoru; Halima Nakaayi; Emily Nanziri; Leni Shida | 4 × 400 m | —N/a | | | | 3:35.03 | 8 |

Field events

| Athlete | Event | Final | |
| Athlete | Event | Distance | Rank |
|---|---|---|---|
| Josephine Lalam | Javelin throw | 48.92 | 8 |

== Badminton ==
Uganda participated with four athletes (two men and two women)

Singles

| Athlete | Event | Round of 64 | Round of 32 | Round of 16 | Quarterfinal | Semifinal | Final / BM | |
| Athlete | Event | Opposition Score | Opposition Score | Opposition Score | Opposition Score | Opposition Score | Opposition Score | Rank |
|---|---|---|---|---|---|---|---|---|
| Edwin Ekiring | Men's singles | Coetzer (RSA); W 2 - 0 | Ouseph (ENG); L 0 - 2 | Did not advance | | | | |
| Brian Kasirye | Men's singles | Clark (FAI); W 2 - 0 | Bonkowsky (TTO); W 2 - 1 | Lee (MAS); L 0 - 2 | Did not advance | | | |
| Bridget Bangi | Women's singles | Bye | Yeo (SGP); L W/O | Did not advance | | | | |
| Aisha Nakiyemba | Women's singles | Bye | Wynter (JAM); L 0 - 2 | Did not advance | | | | |

Doubles

| Athlete | Event | Round of 64 | Round of 32 | Round of 16 | Quarterfinal | Semifinal | Final / BM | |
| Athlete | Event | Opposition Score | Opposition Score | Opposition Score | Opposition Score | Opposition Score | Opposition Score | Rank |
|---|---|---|---|---|---|---|---|---|
| Edwin Ekiring; Brian Kasirye | Men's doubles | —N/a | Bignell / Hutchings (JER); L 0 - 2 | Did not advance | | | | |
| Bridget Bangi; Aisha Nakiyemba | Women's doubles | —N/a | Allet / Chan-Lam (MRI); L W/O | Did not advance | | | | |
| Bridget Bangi; Edwin Ekiring | Mixed doubles | Dias / Hendahewa (SRI); L 0 - 2 | Did not advance | | | | | |
| Aisha Nakiyemba; Brian Kasirye | Mixed doubles | Molia / Gibson (FIJ); L 1 - 2 | Did not advance | | | | | |

Mixed team

Roster

- Bridget Bangi
- Edwin Ekiring
- Brian Kasirye
- Aisha Nakiyemba

Pool C

| Pos | Team | Pld | W | L | MF | MA | MD | GF | GA | GD | PF | PA | PD | Pts | Qualification |
|---|---|---|---|---|---|---|---|---|---|---|---|---|---|---|---|
| 1 | England | 3 | 3 | 0 | 15 | 0 | +15 | 30 | 0 | +30 | 630 | 345 | +285 | 3 | Knockout stage |
| 2 | Australia | 3 | 2 | 1 | 9 | 6 | +3 | 19 | 12 | +7 | 576 | 472 | +104 | 2 | Knockout stage |
| 3 | South Africa | 3 | 1 | 2 | 3 | 12 | −9 | 6 | 24 | −18 | 410 | 592 | −182 | 1 | |
| 4 | Uganda | 3 | 0 | 3 | 3 | 12 | −9 | 6 | 25 | −19 | 406 | 613 | −207 | 0 | |

Updated to match(es) played on 6 April 2018. Source: GC2018

England
5
Carrara Sports and Leisure Centre, Gold Coast
5 April

Uganda
0

| | | | 1 | 2 | 3 |
|---|---|---|---|---|---|
| 1 | (England) (Uganda) | Chris Adcock / Gabby Adcock; Brian Kasirye / Aisha Nakiyemba | 21; 5 | 21; 9 |
| 2 | (England) (Uganda) | Rajiv Ouseph; Edwin Ekiring | 21; 11 | 21; 15 |
| 3 | (England) (Uganda) | Chloe Birch; Shamim Bangi | 21; 12 | 21; 10 |
| 4 | (England) (Uganda) | Chris Langridge / Marcus Ellis; Brian Kasirye / Edwin Ekiring | 21; 9 | 21; 5 |
| 5 | (England) (Uganda) | Jessica Pugh / Chloe Birch; Aisha Nakiyemba / Shamim Bangi | 21; 12 | 21; 12 |

Australia
4
Carrara Sports and Leisure Centre, Gold Coast
6 April

Uganda
1

| | | | 1 | 2 | 3 |
|---|---|---|---|---|---|
| 1 | (Australia) (Uganda) | Ross Smith / Leanne Choo; Brian Kasirye / Aisha Nakiyemba | 21; 13 | 21; 15 |
| 2 | (Australia) (Uganda) | Anthony Joe; Edwin Ekiring | 21; 23 | 21; 19 | 10; 21 |
| 3 | (Australia) (Uganda) | Wendy Chen Hsuan-yu; Shamim Bangi | 21; 5 | 21; 12 |
| 4 | (Australia) (Uganda) | Robin Middleton / Ross Smith; Edwin Ekiring / Brian Kasirye | 21; 12 | 21; 6 |
| 5 | (Australia) (Uganda) | Leanne Choo / Renuga Veeran; Shamim Bangi / Aisha Nakiyemba | 21; 7 | 21; 5 |

South Africa
3
Carrara Sports and Leisure Centre, Gold Coast
6 April

Uganda
2

| | | | 1 | 2 | 3 |
|---|---|---|---|---|---|
| 1 | (South Africa) (Uganda) | Prakash Vijayanath / Michelle Butler-Emmett; Brian Kasirye / Aisha Nakiyemba | 21; 16 | 21; 15 |
| 2 | (South Africa) (Uganda) | Bongani von Bodenstein; Edwin Ekiring | 13; 21 | 11; 21 |
| 3 | (South Africa) (Uganda) | Johanita Scholtz; Shamim Bangi | 13; 21 | 20; 22 |
| 4 | (South Africa) (Uganda) | Prakash Vijayanath / Cameron Coetzer; Edwin Ekiring / Brian Kasirye | 21; 16 | 21; 16 |
| 5 | (South Africa) (Uganda) | Michelle Butler-Emmett / Elsie de Villiers; Aisha Nakiyemba / Shamim Bangi | 21; 10 | 21; 10 |

== Boxing ==
Uganda participated with a team of 5 athletes (5 men).

Men

| Athlete | Event | Round of 32 | Round of 16 | Quarterfinals | Semifinals | Final | Rank |
| Athlete | Event | Opposition Result | Opposition Result | Opposition Result | Opposition Result | Opposition Result | Rank |
|---|---|---|---|---|---|---|---|
| Juma Miiro | −49 kg | —N/a | Bye | Shaffi Hassan (KEN); W 3 - 2 | Amit Panghal (IND); L 0 - 5 | Did not advance | 3rd place, bronze medalist(s) |
| Bashir Nasir | −56 kg | —N/a | Zweli Dlamini (SWZ); L 1 - 4 | Did not advance | | | |
| Kavuma Ssemujju | −64 kg | Luke McCormack (ENG); L 0−5 | Did not advance | | | | |
| Musa Bwogi | −69 kg | bye | Merven Clair (MRI); W 3 - 2 | Pat McCormack (ENG); L 0 - 5 | Did not advance | | |
| Regarn Simbwa | −81 kg | —N/a | Lukmon Lawal (NGR); W 4 - 1 | Sammy Lee (WAL); L 1 - 3 | Did not advance | | |

== Cycling ==
Uganda participated with 2 athletes (2 men).

=== Road ===
Men

| Athlete | Event | Time | Rank |
|---|---|---|---|
| Charles Kagimu | Road race | 3:57:58 | 20 |
| Charles Kagimu | Time trial | 55:38.87 | 32 |
| Viena Ssekanga | Road race | DNF | |

== Netball ==
Uganda qualified a netball team by virtue of being ranked in the top 11 (excluding the host nation, Australia) of the INF World Rankings on July 1, 2017. The country will be making its Commonwealth Games debut in the sport.

Roster

The following is the Uganda roster in the netball tournament of the 2018 Commonwealth Games.

Uganda national netball team – 2018 Commonwealth Games roster
Players
Coaches

| Pos. | Name | Age - DOB | Ht. | Club | Club nat. |
|---|---|---|---|---|---|
| | Ajio, Lilian | - | – | Prisons | (Uganda) |
| | Kizza, Betty | - | – | NIC | (Uganda) |
| | Meeme, Ruth | - | – | | (Uganda) |
| | Nakabuye, Hadijah | - | – | Prisons | (Uganda) |
| | Nakachwa, Halima | - | – | Prisons | (Uganda) |
| | Nampungu, Joan | - | – | NIC | (Uganda) |
| | Namuwaya, Muhayimina | - | – | | (Uganda) |
| | Nanyonga, Florence | - | – | Prisons | (Uganda) |
| | Nanyonga, Racheal | - | – | NIC | (Uganda) |
| | Nanfuka, Stella | - | – | Prisons | (Uganda) |
| | Oyella, Stella | - | – | Prisons | (Uganda) |
| | Proscovia, Peace (C) | - | – | Loughborough Lightning | (England) |

Head coach

Imelda Nyongesa
Rashid Mubiru

Legend

- (C) Team captain
- Club field describes current pro club
- Injured

Pool B

| Pos | Team | Pld | W | D | L | GF | GA | GD | Pts | Qualification |
|---|---|---|---|---|---|---|---|---|---|---|
| 1 | England | 5 | 5 | 0 | 0 | 342 | 202 | +140 | 10 | Semi-finals |
| 2 | New Zealand | 5 | 3 | 0 | 2 | 292 | 235 | +57 | 6 | Semi-finals |
| 3 | Uganda | 5 | 3 | 0 | 2 | 287 | 248 | +39 | 6 | Classification matches |
| 4 | Malawi | 5 | 3 | 0 | 2 | 277 | 284 | −7 | 6 | Classification matches |
| 5 | Scotland | 5 | 1 | 0 | 4 | 195 | 289 | −94 | 2 | Classification matches |
| 6 | Wales | 5 | 0 | 0 | 5 | 215 | 350 | −135 | 0 | Classification matches |

Updated to match(es) played on 11 April 2018. Source: GC2018

5 April 2018
18:30

Report
New Zealand
64–51
Uganda

Gold Coast Convention and Exhibition Centre
Umpires: Helen George
Kate Stephenson
Reserve umpire: Gary Burgess
Folau 22/22 (100%)
Ekenasio 19/26 (73%)
Selby-Rickit 13/14 (93%)
Mes 10/17 (59%)

Proscovia 37/42 (88%)
Nanyonga 14/16 (88%)

7 April 2018
13:00

Report
Uganda
54–52
Malawi

Gold Coast Convention and Exhibition Centre
Umpires: Joshua Bowring
Gary Burgess
Reserve umpire: Jono Bredin
Proscovia 35/38 (92%)
Nanyonga 19/21 (90%)

Kumwenda 43/47 (91%)
Chimaliro 8/10 (80%)
Simtow 1/1 (100%)

8 April 2018
15:00

Report
England
55–49
Uganda

Gold Coast Convention and Exhibition Centre
Umpires: Michelle Phippard
Marc Henning
Reserve umpire: Helen George
Housby 30/34 (88%)
Harten 11/11 (100%)
Corbin 7/10 (70%)
Haythornthwaite 7/7 (100%)

Proscovia 23/26 (88%)
Nanyonga 22/27 (81%)
Nakabuye 4/4 (100%)

10 April 2018
20:30

Report
Wales
40–76
Uganda

Gold Coast Convention and Exhibition Centre
Umpires: Marc Henning
Joshua Bowring
Reserve umpire: Angela Armstrong-Lush
Lewis 34/42 (81%)
Rowe 6/7 (86%)
Llewelyn 0/1 (0%)

Proscovia 56/63 (89%)
Nanyonga 20/24 (83%)

11 April 2018
16:00

Report
Uganda
57–37
Scotland

Gold Coast Convention and Exhibition Centre
Umpires: Helen George
Angela Armstrong-Lush
Reserve umpire: Theresa Prince
Proscovia 32/34 (94%)
Nanyonga 25/30 (83%)

Gallagher 19/21 (90%)
Goodwin 16/25 (64%)
McCall 2/8 (25%)

Fifth place match

12 April 2018
09:00

Report
South Africa
53–42
Uganda

Gold Coast Convention and Exhibition Centre
Umpires: Jackie Mizon
Joshua Bowring
Reserve umpire: Marc Henning
Venter 42/46 (91%)
Holtzhausen 11/12 (92%)

Oyella 22/25 (88%)
Proscovia 19/19 (100%)
Nanyonga 1/4 (25%)

== Rugby sevens ==
=== Men's tournament ===
Uganda qualified a men's rugby sevens team of 12 athletes, by winning the 2017 Africa Cup Sevens.

Roster

- Desire Ayera
- Joseph Jadwong
- Adrian Kasito
- Timothy Kisiga
- Ivan Magomu
- James Odongo
- Aaron Ofoyrwoth
- Pius Ogena
- Solomon Okia
- Micheal Okorach
- Lawrence Ssebuliba
- Philip Wokorach

Pool D

| Pos | Team | Pld | W | D | L | PF | PA | PD | Pts | Qualification |
|---|---|---|---|---|---|---|---|---|---|---|
| 1 | Fiji | 3 | 3 | 0 | 0 | 138 | 22 | +116 | 9 | Semi-finals |
| 2 | Wales | 3 | 2 | 0 | 1 | 90 | 38 | +52 | 7 | Classification semi-finals |
| 3 | Uganda | 3 | 1 | 0 | 2 | 38 | 95 | −57 | 5 | |
| 4 | Sri Lanka | 3 | 0 | 0 | 3 | 27 | 138 | −111 | 3 | |

Source: GC2018
Rules for classification: 1) Points; 2) Head-to-head result; 3) Point difference; 4) Points scored.

14 April 2018
10:59

| Wales | 31–5 | Uganda |
| Try: Jenkins 1' m Morgan 3' m Williams 8' c Treharne 9' c Amos 14' c Con: O'Brien (1/3) 9'; Davies (2/2) 10', 14' | (Gold Coast 2018) | Try: Odongo 11' m Con: Wokorach (0/1) |

Robina Stadium, Gold Coast
Referee: Richard Haughton (England)

14 April 2018
17:53

| Fiji | 54–0 | Uganda |
| Try: Tuwai 1' c Sau 2' c Mocenacagi 4' c Ravouvou 6' m Nasilasila 10' c Nasoko 12' c Vakurinabili 13' c Dranisinukula 14' c Con: Ravouvou (3/4) 1', 2', 4'; Nasilasila (3/3) 10', 14', 14'; Naduva (1/1) 12' | (Gold Coast 2018) |

Robina Stadium, Gold Coast
Referee: Damon Murphy (Australia)

14 April 2018
21:11

| Uganda | 33–10 | Sri Lanka |
| Try: Kisiga 1' m Wokorach 4' c Odongo 8' c Kasito 9' c Ogena 11' c Con: Wokorach (4/5) 4', 8', 10', 11' | (Gold Coast 2018) | Try: Wijekoon (2) 1' m, 7' m Con: Ratwatte (0/2) |

Robina Stadium, Gold Coast
Referee: Richard Haughton (England)

== Shooting ==
Uganda participated with 1 athlete (1 woman).

| Athlete | Event | Final | |
| Athlete | Event | Points | Rank |
|---|---|---|---|
| Cleopatra Mungoma | Women's 50 metre rifle prone | 571.9 | 20 |

== Squash ==
Uganda participated with 2 athletes (2 men).

Individual

| Athlete | Event | Round of 64 | Round of 32 | Round of 16 | Quarterfinals | Semifinals | Final | |
| Athlete | Event | Opposition Score | Opposition Score | Opposition Score | Opposition Score | Opposition Score | Opposition Score | Rank |
|---|---|---|---|---|---|---|---|---|
| Michael Kawooya | Men's singles | Suari (PNG); W 3 - 0 | Selby (ENG); L 0 - 3 | Did not advance | | | | |
| Ian Rukunya | Men's singles | Henry (FIJ); W 3 - 0 | Matthew (ENG); L 0 - 3 | Did not advance | | | | |

Doubles

| Athlete | Event | Group stage | | | Round of 16 | Quarterfinals | Semifinals | Final | |
| Athlete | Event | Opposition Score | Opposition Score | Rank | Opposition Score | Opposition Score | Opposition Score | Opposition Score | Rank |
|---|---|---|---|---|---|---|---|---|---|
| Michael Kawooya; Ian Rukunya | Men's doubles | Selby / Waller (ENG); L 0 - 3 | Kamal / Ng (MAS); L 0 - 3 | 3 | Did not advance | | | | |

== Swimming ==
Uganda participated with 2 athletes (1 man and 1 woman).

| Athlete | Event | Heat | | Semifinal | | Final | |
| Athlete | Event | Time | Rank | Time | Rank | Time | Rank |
|---|---|---|---|---|---|---|---|
| Ekirikubinza Tibatemwa | Men's 50 m freestyle | 24.93 | 47 | Did not advance | | | |
| Ekirikubinza Tibatemwa | Men's 50 m butterfly | 27.17 | 43 | Did not advance | | | |
| Avice Meya | Women's 50 m freestyle | 29.09 | 35 | Did not advance | | | |
| Avice Meya | Women's 50 m butterfly | 32.50 | 27 | Did not advance | | | |

== Table tennis ==
Uganda participated with 2 athletes (1 man and 1 woman).

Singles

| Athletes | Event | Group stage | | | Round of 64 | Round of 32 | Round of 16 | Quarterfinal | Semifinal | Final | Rank |
| Athletes | Event | Opposition Score | Opposition Score | Rank | Opposition Score | Opposition Score | Opposition Score | Opposition Score | Opposition Score | Opposition Score | Rank |
|---|---|---|---|---|---|---|---|---|---|---|---|
| Ronald Nyaika | Men's singles | Ashley Robinson (NIR); L 0 - 4 | St. Louis (TTO); L 0 - 4 | 3 | Did not advance | | | | | | |
| Halima Nambozo | Women's singles | Chang (MAS); L 0 - 4 | Hursey (WAL); L 0 - 4 | 3 | —N/a | Did not advance | | | | | |

Doubles

| Athletes | Event | Round of 64 | Round of 32 | Round of 16 | Quarterfinal | Semifinal | Final | Rank |
| Athletes | Event | Opposition Score | Opposition Score | Opposition Score | Opposition Score | Opposition Score | Opposition Score | Rank |
|---|---|---|---|---|---|---|---|---|
| Halima Nambozo; Ronald Nyaika | Mixed doubles | Powell / Miao (AUS); L 0 - 3 | Did not advance | | | | | |

== Weightlifting ==
Uganda participated with 4 athletes (3 men and 1 woman).

| Athlete | Event | Snatch | | Clean & jerk | | Total | Rank |
| Athlete | Event | Result | Rank | Result | Rank | Total | Rank |
|---|---|---|---|---|---|---|---|
| Julius Ssekitoleko | Men's −56 kg | 67 | 11 | 91 | 10 | 158 | 10 |
| Hakim Ssempereza | Men's −69 kg | 109 | 11 | 136 | 9 | 245 | 9 |
| Kalidi Batuusa | Men's −94 kg | 120 | 13 | 155 | 9 | 175 | 10 |
| Irene Kasuubo | Women's −63 kg | 71 | 11 | 85 | 11 | 156 | 10 |

== See also ==
- Uganda at the 2018 Summer Youth Olympics
