= Netball at the 2018 Commonwealth Games =

- Venue: Gold Coast Convention and Exhibition Centre; Coomera Indoor Sports Centre
- Dates: 5–15 April 2018
- Competitors: 144 from 12 nations

Medalists
gold medal	England
silver medal	Australia
bronze medal	Jamaica

Netball at the 2018 Commonwealth Games was the sixth appearance of Netball at the Commonwealth Games. The sport was one of the ten core sports at the 2018 Commonwealth Games, which was held on the Gold Coast in Australia. This was the sixth edition since its inclusion in 1998, and the second time the netball event was held in Australia.

The competition took place between 5 and 15 April 2018. Preliminary matches were held at the Gold Coast Convention and Exhibition Centre, with finals matches held at the Coomera Indoor Sports Centre. A total of 144 athletes from 12 nations participated in the tournament. England won the gold medal, defeating Australia in the final. Jamaica won the bronze medal.

== Schedule ==
The following is the competition schedule for the netball competition:

P	Pool stage	CM	Classification matches	½	Semi-finals	B	Bronze medal match	G	Gold medal match

Event↓/Date →	Thu 5	Fri 6	Sat 7	Sun 8	Mon 9	Tue 10	Wed 11	Thu 12	Fri 13	Sat 14	Sun 15	
Women	P	P	P	P	P	P	P	CM		½	B	G

== Venues ==
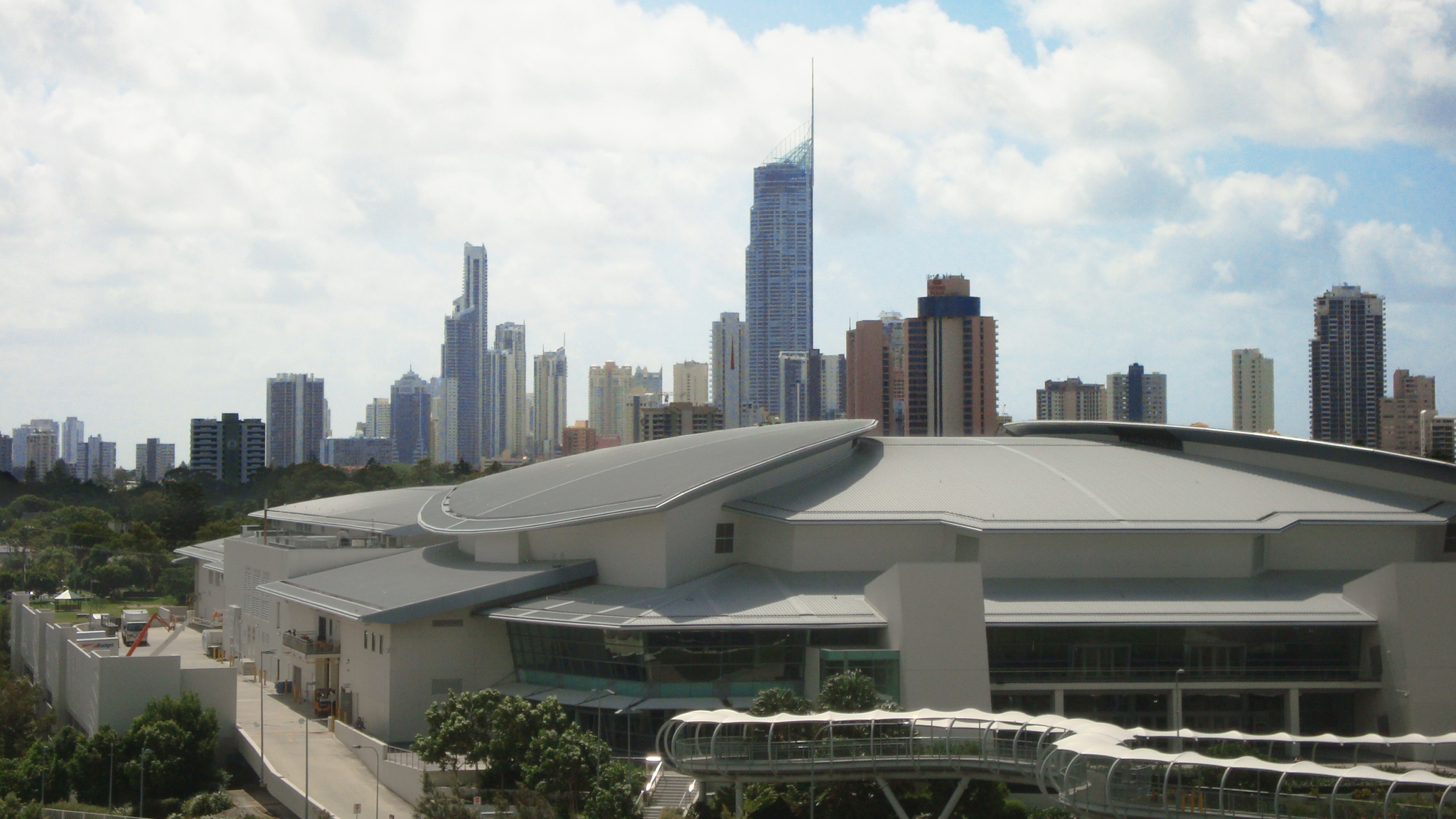
Gold Coast Convention and Exhibition Centre, which will stage preliminary netball matches for the 2018 Games.

All matches for the netball event were held in the host city.

Preliminary matches were played at the Gold Coast Convention and Exhibition Centre, which has a seating capacity of 5,000. The venue also hosted basketball matches and was the Main Media Centre for the Games.

Finals matches were played at the Coomera Indoor Sports Centre, which opened in 2016 and has a seating capacity of 7,500. It also hosted some gymnastics events for the Games.

== Qualification ==
Twelve nations competed in the netball competition at the 2018 Commonwealth Games:

- Australia qualified as the host nation for the Games;
- The remaining 11 nations comprised the 11 highest-ranked teams in the INF World Rankings (excluding the host nation) as at 1 July 2017, with at least three Commonwealth Games Federation regions (Africa, Americas, Asia, Caribbean, Europe and Oceania) being represented. The teams were officially confirmed on July 25, 2017.

Event	Date	Vacancies	Qualified
Host Nation	—N/a	1	Australia
INF World Rankings	1 July 2017	11	New Zealand; England; Jamaica; South Africa; Malawi; Fiji; Wales; Uganda; Northern Ireland; Barbados; Scotland
Total		12	

== Rosters ==
There were 12 participating nations at the netball competitions with a total of 144 athletes, up to 12 per team. The number of athletes a nation entered is in parentheses beside the name of the country.

- Australia (12)
- Barbados (12)
- England (12)
- Fiji (12)
- Jamaica (12)
- Malawi (12)
- New Zealand (12)
- Northern Ireland (12)
- Scotland (12)
- South Africa (12)
- Uganda (12)
- Wales (12)

== Preliminary round ==
=== Pool A ===
Pos	Team	Pld	W	D	L	GF	GA	GD	Pts	Qualification
1	Australia (H)	5	5	0	0	413	162	+251	10	Semi-finals
2	Jamaica	5	4	0	1	351	221	+130	8	Semi-finals
3	South Africa	5	3	0	2	310	205	+105	6	Classification matches
4	Northern Ireland	5	2	0	3	224	307	−83	4	Classification matches
5	Barbados	5	1	0	4	185	333	−148	2	Classification matches
6	Fiji	5	0	0	5	171	426	−255	0	Classification matches

Updated to match(es) played on 11 April 2018. Source: GC2018
(H) Hosts

5 April 2018
13:00

Report
Jamaica
88–30
Fiji

Gold Coast Convention and Exhibition Centre
Umpires: Jackie Mizon
Angela Armonstrong-Lush
Reserve umpire: Marc Henning
Fowler-Reid 40/43 (93%)
Aiken 24/32 (75%)
Robinson 15/16 (94%)
Beckford 9/11 (82%)

M. Rusivakula 17/19 (89%)
Waqa 7/11 (64%)
Paul 3/7 (43%)
U. Rusivakula 3/5 (60%)

5 April 2018
20:30

Report
Australia
94–26
Northern Ireland

Gold Coast Convention and Exhibition Centre
Umpires: Maria van der Merwe
Jono Bredin
Reserve umpire: Lisa McPhail
Thwaites 39/39 (100%)
Bassett 31/34 (91%)
Pettitt 13/13 (100%)
Wood 11/15 (73%)

L. Bowman 13/22 (59%)
McCullogh 6/9 (67%)
Lennon 4/6 (67%)
K. Bowman 3/4 (75%)

6 April 2018
15:00

Report
South Africa
46–57
Jamaica

Gold Coast Convention and Exhibition Centre
Umpires: Gary Burgess
Michelle Phippard
Reserve umpire: Helen George
Venter 19/23 (83%)
Burger 15/15 (100%)
Holtzhausen 12/18 (67%)

Fowler-Reid 29/31 (94%)
Beckford 15/20 (75%)
Aiken 13/16 (81%)

6 April 2018
20:30

Report
Barbados
24–79
Australia

Gold Coast Convention and Exhibition Centre
Umpires: Lisa McPhail
Kristie Simpson
Reserve umpire: Kate Stephenson
Wharton 12/17 (71%)
Blackman 8/10 (80%)
Payne 4/5 (80%)

Thwaites 24/24 (100%)
Bassett 23/26 (88%)
Wood 17/17 (100%)
Pettitt 15/15 (100%)

7 April 2018
15:00

Report
Northern Ireland
35–49
South Africa

Gold Coast Convention and Exhibition Centre
Umpires: Kate Stephenson
Lisa McPhail
Reserve umpire: Jackie Mizon
L. Bowman 21/25 (84%)
Lennon 5/6 (83%)
McCullogh 5/11 (45%)
K. Bowman 4/7 (57%)

Burger 38/41 (93%)
Venter 7/9 (78%)
Holtzhausen 4/9 (44%)

7 April 2018
20:30

Report
Fiji
44–65
Barbados

Gold Coast Convention and Exhibition Centre
Umpires: Maria van der Merwe
Theresa Prince
Reserve umpire: Michelle Phippard
M. Rusivakula 27/31 (87%)
U. Rusivakula 10/12 (83%)
Waqa 7/8 (88%)

Wharton 33/38 (87%)
Blackman 22/28 (79%)
Payne 10/12 (83%)

8 April 2018
13:00

Report
Jamaica
79–41
Northern Ireland

Gold Coast Convention and Exhibition Centre
Umpires: Jackie Mizon
Kristie Simpson
Reserve umpire: Angela Armstrong-Lush
Fowler-Reid 32/33 (97%)
Aiken 26/28 (93%)
Beckford 11/11 (100%)
Robinson 10/11 (91%)

Bowman 23/32 (72%)
K. Bowman 11/16 (69%)
Lennon 7/8 (88%)

8 April 2018
20:30

Report
Australia
60–38
South Africa

Gold Coast Convention and Exhibition Centre
Umpires: Jono Bredin
Lisa McPhail
Reserve umpire: Kate Stephenson
Bassett 20/23 (87%)
Thwaites 15/15 (100%)
Wood 14/15 (93%)
Pettitt 11/11 (100%)

Venter 33/40 (83%)
Holtzhausen 5/10 (50%)

9 April 2018
15:00

Report
Fiji
23–108
Australia

Gold Coast Convention and Exhibition Centre
Umpires: Angela Armstrong-Lush
Kristie Simpson
Reserve umpire: Jackie Mizon
Waqa 15/19 (79%)
M. Rusivakula 8/14 (57%)

Bassett 40/41 (98%)
Thwaites 30/31 (97%)
Pettitt 23/23 (100%)
Wood 15/19 (79%)

9 April 2018
18:30

Report
Jamaica
76–32
Barbados

Gold Coast Convention and Exhibition Centre
Umpires: Maria van der Merwe
Marc Henning
Reserve umpire: Gary Burgess
Fowler-Reid 32/36 (89%)
Aiken 28/33 (85%)
Beckford 12/14 (86%)
Robinson 4/8 (50%)

Blackman 17/19 (89%)
Wharton 9/12 (75%)
Payne 6/9 (67%)

10 April 2018
13:00

Report
Barbados
39–49
Northern Ireland

Gold Coast Convention and Exhibition Centre
Umpires: Theresa Prince
Gary Burgess
Reserve umpire: Maria van der Merwe
Wharton 27/29 (93%)
Blackman 9/12 (75%)
Payne 3/3 (100%)

L. Bowman 20/25 (80%)
Lennon 15/16 (94%)
Oonagh McCullough 9/15 (60%)
K. Bowman 5/7 (71%)

10 April 2018
18:30

Report
South Africa
92–28
Fiji

Gold Coast Convention and Exhibition Centre
Umpires: Michelle Phippard
Jackie Mizon
Reserve umpire: Kate Stephenson
Burger 56/59 (95%)
Venter 20/22 (91%)
Stoltz 16/21 (76%)

Waqa 19/26 (73%)
M. Rusivakula 8/12 (67%)
U. Rusivakula 1/2 (50%)

11 April 2018
11:00

Report
South Africa
85–25
Barbados

Gold Coast Convention and Exhibition Centre
Umpires: Jackie Mizon
Kate Stephenson
Reserve umpire: Jono Bredin
Venter 34/35 (97%)
Burger 33/35 (94%)
Holtzhausen 10/14 (71%)
Stoltz 8/9 (89%)

Blackman 14/15 (93%)
Payne 11/17 (65%)

11 April 2018
14:00

Report
Northern Ireland
73–46
Fiji

Gold Coast Convention and Exhibition Centre
Umpires: Kristie Simpson
Maria van der Merwe
Reserve umpire: Gary Burgess
L. Bowman 59/65 (91%)
McCullough 10/14 (71%)
K. Bowman 4/8 (50%)

M. Rusivakula 25/32 (78%)
Waqa 21/30 (70%)

11 April 2018
21:00

Report
Australia
72–51
Jamaica

Gold Coast Convention and Exhibition Centre
Umpires: Gary Burgess
Lisa McPhail
Reserve umpire: Kristie Simpson
Bassett 22/23 (96%)
Thwaites 22/22 (100%)
Pettitt 20/21 (95%)
Wood 8/10 (80%)

Fowler-Reid 30/32 (94%)
Aiken 11/14 (79%)
Beckford 8/12 (67%)
Robinson 2/2 (100%)

=== Pool B ===
Pos	Team	Pld	W	D	L	GF	GA	GD	Pts	Qualification
1	England	5	5	0	0	342	202	+140	10	Semi-finals
2	New Zealand	5	3	0	2	292	235	+57	6	Semi-finals
3	Uganda	5	3	0	2	287	248	+39	6	Classification matches
4	Malawi	5	3	0	2	277	284	−7	6	Classification matches
5	Scotland	5	1	0	4	195	289	−94	2	Classification matches
6	Wales	5	0	0	5	215	350	−135	0	Classification matches

Updated to match(es) played on 11 April 2018. Source: GC2018

5 April 2018
15:00

Report
England
74–28
Scotland

Gold Coast Convention and Exhibition Centre
Umpires: Kristie Simpson
Joshua Bowring
Reserve umpire: Michelle Phippard
Harten 40/43 (93%)
Corbin 17/18 (94%)
Housby 17/21 (81%)

Goodwin 15/19 (79%)
Gallagher 7/11 (64%)
McCall 4/7 (57%)
Pettitt 2/6 (33%)

5 April 2018
18:30

Report
New Zealand
64–51
Uganda

Gold Coast Convention and Exhibition Centre
Umpires: Helen George
Kate Stephenson
Reserve umpire: Gary Burgess
Folau 22/22 (100%)
Ekenasio 19/26 (73%)
Selby-Rickit 13/14 (93%)
Mes 10/17 (59%)

Proscovia 37/42 (88%)
Nanyonga 14/16 (88%)

6 April 2018
13:00

Report
Wales
44–70
New Zealand

Gold Coast Convention and Exhibition Centre
Umpires: Theresa Prince
Jackie Mizon
Reserve umpire: Joshua Bowring
Moseley 21/30 (70%)
Lewis 21/31 (68%)
Llewelyn 1/1 (100%)
Rowe 1/2 (50%)

Selby-Rickit 28/31 (90%)
Folau 19/23 (83%)
Ekenasio 13/17 (76%)
Mes 10/14 (71%)

6 April 2018
18:30

Report
Malawi
49–74
England

Gold Coast Convention and Exhibition Centre
Umpires: Marc Henning
Jono Bredin
Reserve umpire: Maria van der Merwe
Kumwenda 31/33 (94%)
Mvula 10/11 (91%)
Chimaliro 7/7 (100%)
Simtowe 1/3 (33%)

Harten 48/54 (89%)
Housby 14/18 (78%)
Corbin 6/7 (86%)
Haythornthwaite 6/7 (86%)

7 April 2018
13:00

Report
Uganda
54–52
Malawi

Gold Coast Convention and Exhibition Centre
Umpires: Joshua Bowring
Gary Burgess
Reserve umpire: Jono Bredin
Proscovia 35/38 (92%)
Nanyonga 19/21 (90%)

Kumwenda 43/47 (91%)
Chimaliro 8/10 (80%)
Simtow 1/1 (100%)

7 April 2018
18:30

Report
Scotland
51–47
Wales

Gold Coast Convention and Exhibition Centre
Umpires: Helen George
Angela Armstrong-Lush
Reserve umpire: Marc Henning
Goodwin 38/45 (84%)
Gallagher 13/14 (93%)

Lewis 39/48 (81%)
Moseley 5/8 (63%)
Llewelyn 3/3 (100%)

8 April 2018
15:00

Report
England
55–49
Uganda

Gold Coast Convention and Exhibition Centre
Umpires: Michelle Phippard
Marc Henning
Reserve umpire: Helen George
Housby 30/34 (88%)
Harten 11/11 (100%)
Corbin 7/10 (70%)
Haythornthwaite 7/7 (100%)

Proscovia 23/26 (88%)
Nanyonga 22/27 (81%)
Nakabuye 4/4 (100%)

8 April 2018
18:30

Report
Malawi
57–53
New Zealand

Gold Coast Convention and Exhibition Centre
Umpires: Joshua Bowring
Gary Burgess
Reserve umpire: Theresa Prince
Kumwenda 41/46 (89%)
Chimaliro 16/20 (80%)

Folau 31/39 (79%)
Selby-Rickit 15/17 (88%)
Mes 7/12 (58%)
Ekenasio 0/2 (0%)

9 April 2018
13:00

Report
England
85–31
Wales

Gold Coast Convention and Exhibition Centre
Umpires: Helen George
Theresa Prince
Reserve umpire: Lisa McPhail
Housby 34/36 (94%)
Harten 26/32 (81%)
Haythornthwaite 13/14 (93%)
Corbin 12/14 (86%)

Lewis 22/28 (79%)
Rowe 5/6 (83%)
Moseley 4/6 (67%)

9 April 2018
20:30

Report
New Zealand
60–29
Scotland

Gold Coast Convention and Exhibition Centre
Umpires: Kate Stephenson
Michelle Phippard
Reserve umpire: Joshua Bowring
Selby-Rickit 33/37 (89%)
Folau 27/35 (77%)

Goodwin 23/28 (82%)
Gallagher 6/7 (86%)

10 April 2018
15:00

Report
Scotland
50–51
Malawi

Gold Coast Convention and Exhibition Centre
Umpires: Jono Bredin
Lisa McPhail
Reserve umpire: Kristie Simpson
Goodwin 38/42 (90%)
Gallagher 12/15 (80%)

Kumwenda 44/47 (94%)
Chimaliro 7/8 (88%)

10 April 2018
20:30

Report
Wales
40–76
Uganda

Gold Coast Convention and Exhibition Centre
Umpires: Marc Henning
Joshua Bowring
Reserve umpire: Angela Armstrong-Lush
Lewis 34/42 (81%)
Rowe 6/7 (86%)
Llewelyn 0/1 (0%)

Proscovia 56/63 (89%)
Nanyonga 20/24 (83%)

11 April 2018
09:00

Report
New Zealand
45–54
England

Gold Coast Convention and Exhibition Centre
Umpires: Michelle Phippard
Marc Henning
Reserve umpire: Joshua Bowring
Folau 30/39 (77%)
Selby-Rickit 12/19 (63%)
Mes 3/4 (75%)

Housby 27/32 (84%)
Harten 27/31 (87%)

11 April 2018
16:00

Report
Uganda
57–37
Scotland

Gold Coast Convention and Exhibition Centre
Umpires: Helen George
Angela Armstrong-Lush
Reserve umpire: Theresa Prince
Proscovia 32/34 (94%)
Nanyonga 25/30 (83%)

Gallagher 19/21 (90%)
Goodwin 16/25 (64%)
McCall 2/8 (25%)

11 April 2018
19:00

Report
Malawi
68–53
Wales

Gold Coast Convention and Exhibition Centre
Umpires: Joshua Bowring
Jono Bredin
Reserve umpire: Jackie Mizon
Kumwenda 47/50 (94%)
Chimaliro 18/18 (100%)
Simtowe 3/4 (75%)

Lewis 41/53 (77%)
Llewlyn 9/10 (90%)
Moseley 3/5 (60%)

== Classification matches ==
=== Eleventh place match ===
12 April 2018
16:00

Report
Fiji
32–81
Wales

Gold Coast Convention and Exhibition Centre
Umpires: Angela Armstrong-Lush
Kate Stephenson
Reserve umpire: Lisa McPhail
Cirikisuva 10/12 (83%)
Waqa 9/12 (75%)
M. Rusivakula 7/10 (70%)
U. Rusivakula 6/6 (100%)

Lewis 35/39 (90%)
Rowe 25/26 (96%)
Moseley 12/12 (100%)
Llewelyn 9/12 (75%)

=== Ninth place match ===
12 April 2018
11:00

Report
Barbados
48–50
Scotland

Gold Coast Convention and Exhibition Centre
Umpires: Helen George
Maria van der Merwe
Reserve umpire: Gary Burgess
Payne 22/24 (92%)
Blackman 15/17 (88%)
Wharton 11/12 (92%)

Gallagher 35/37 (95%)
Goodwin 13/21 (62%)
Pettitt 2/5 (40%)

=== Seventh place match ===
12 April 2018
14:00

Report
Malawi
60–52
Northern Ireland

Gold Coast Convention and Exhibition Centre
Umpires: Kristie Simpson
Theresa Prince
Reserve umpire: Jono Bredin
Kumwenda 48/51 (94%)
Chimaliro 8/10 (80%)
Mvula 4/7 (57%)

L. Bowman 33/38 (87%)
K. Bowman 9/11 (82%)
Lennon 6/9 (67%)
McCullough 4/7 (57%)

=== Fifth place match ===
12 April 2018
09:00

Report
South Africa
53–42
Uganda

Gold Coast Convention and Exhibition Centre
Umpires: Jackie Mizon
Joshua Bowring
Reserve umpire: Marc Henning
Venter 42/46 (91%)
Holtzhausen 11/12 (92%)

Oyella 22/25 (88%)
Proscovia 19/19 (100%)
Nanyonga 1/4 (25%)

== Medal round ==
Semi-finals
14 April 2018
Australia	65
New Zealand	44
14 April 2018
England	56
Jamaica	55

Gold medal match
15 April 2018
Australia	51
England	52
Bronze medal match
15 April 2018
New Zealand	55
Jamaica	60

=== Semi-finals ===
14 April 2018
17:00

Report
Australia
65–44
New Zealand

Coomera Indoor Sports Centre
Umpires: Gary Burgess
Jackie Mizon
Reserve umpire: Kate Stephenson
Thwaites 24/25 (96%)
Bassett 17/18 (94%)
Pettitt 15/16 (94%)
Wood 9/12 (75%)

Folau 32/41 (78%)
Ekenasio 7/9 (78%)
Selby-Rickit 3/5 (60%)
Mes 2/3 (67%)

14 April 2018
15:00

Report
England
56–55
Jamaica

Coomera Indoor Sports Centre
Umpires: Marc Henning
Michelle Phippard
Reserve umpire: Joshua Bowring
Housby 29/35 (83%)
Harten 16/18 (89%)
Haythornthwaite 11/13 (85%)

Fowler-Reid 47/50 (94%)
Beckford 8/9 (89%)

=== Bronze medal match ===
15 April 2018
11:00

Report
New Zealand
55–60
Jamaica

Coomera Indoor Sports Centre
Umpires: Marc Henning
Michelle Phippard
Reserve umpire: Joshua Bowring
Folau 34/44 (77%)
Mes 12/20 (60%)
Ekenasio 9/13 (69%)

Aiken 24/31 (77%)
Fowler-Reid 21/22 (95%)
Beckford 15/18 (83%)

=== Gold medal match ===
15 April 2018
13:00

Report
Australia
51–52
England

Coomera Indoor Sports Centre
Umpires: Lisa McPhail
Jono Bredin
Reserve umpire: Angela Armstrong-Lush
Bassett 22/24 (92%)
Wood 12/14 (86%)
Pettitt 11/12 (92%)
Thwaites 6/6 (100%)

Harten 34/39 (87%)
Housby 18/21 (86%)

== Final standings ==
Place	Nation
Gold	England
Silver	Australia
Bronze	Jamaica
4	New Zealand
5	South Africa
6	Uganda
7	Malawi
8	Northern Ireland
9	Scotland
10	Barbados
11	Wales
12	Fiji

== Medallists ==
Gold	Silver	Bronze
England; Coach: Tracey Neville	Australia; Coach: Lisa Alexander	Jamaica; Coach: Sasher-Gaye Henry
Ama Agbeze (c); Eboni Beckford-Chambers; Jade Clarke; Beth Cobden; Kadeen Corbin; Jodie Gibson; Serena Guthrie; Joanne Harten; Natalie Haythornthwaite; Helen Housby; Geva Mentor; Chelsea Pitman	Caitlin Bassett (c); April Brandley; Courtney Bruce; Laura Geitz; Susan Pettitt; Kim Ravaillion; Madison Robinson; Gabi Simpson; Caitlin Thwaites; Elizabeth Watson; Jo Weston; Stephanie Wood	Romelda Aiken; Shanice Beckford; Nicole Dixon; Stacian Facey; Jhaniele Fowler-Reid (c); Rebekah Robinson; Shamera Sterling; Adean Thomas; Paula Thompson; Jodi-Ann Ward; Khadijah Williams; Vangelee Williams

2018 Commonwealth champions

England
1st title
