= 2015 Netball World Cup =

Netball tournament

Tournament details
- Host country: Australia
- Dates: 7–16 August 2015
- Teams: 16

Final positions
- Champions: Australia (11th title)
- Runners-up: New Zealand
- Third place: England

Tournament statistics
- Top scorer(s): (Malawi) Mwai Kumwenda (321 goals)

The Netball World Cup Sydney 2015 (NWC2015) was the 14th edition of the INF Netball World Cup, the premier competition in international netball. It was held from 7–16 August, in Sydney, Australia, which secured hosting rights after defeating a rival bid from Manchester, England. Matches were played at Allphones Arena and Netball Central. Sixteen nations competed at the championships, including the top six teams from the 2011 World Netball Championships in Singapore. After two rounds in which teams competed in pools of four, Australia, New Zealand, England and Jamaica contested the semi-finals. Australia defended its 2011 title against New Zealand by a narrow 58–55 victory. The final at Allphones Arena was attended by 16,752 people, a world record for any netball game. Malawian shooter Mwai Kumwenda was the player of distinction.

== Organisation ==
=== Hosting rights ===
Bids to host the 2015 Netball World Cup were submitted to the International Netball Federation (INF) in 2010. The two candidate cities chosen were Manchester, England and Sydney, Australia. In March 2011, INF delegates convened in Singapore, host nation of the 2011 World Netball Championships, to consider both bids. At the end of the conference, Sydney was announced as the host city for the 2015 tournament.

This is the second time that Sydney hosted the competition, and the third time in Australia. Sydney last hosted the event in 1991, where Australia won a closely contested final against New Zealand.

=== Venues ===
The sixty four matches were played at the Allphones Arena and Netball Central in Sydney Olympic Park. Allphones Arena hosted the majority of the matches while Netball Central served as the official training venue for all sixteen participating teams. It also hosted pool matches, play-offs and placing games.

=== Broadcasters ===
This is a list of the broadcasters for the tournament in competing countries and regions.

Country	Broadcaster
Australia	Fox Sports (All Matches); Network Ten (Australian Matches Only)
Fiji	Fiji TV; FBC TV
Ireland	Sky Sports
Malawi	SuperSport
New Zealand	Sky Sport
South Africa	SuperSport
Uganda	SuperSport
United Kingdom	Sky Sports
Zambia	SuperSport
Region	Broadcaster
Pacific Islands	Fiji TV; Sky Pacific
Sub-Saharan Africa	SuperSport

== Umpires ==
Seventeen umpires from six countries officiated matches at the tournament.

Nation	Umpire
AUS	Rachael Ayre
AUS	Josh Bowring
AUS	Paula Ferguson
AUS	Sharon Kelly
AUS	Michelle Phippard
ENG	Gary Burgess
ENG	Ian Fuller
ENG	Jackie Mizon
ENG	Tracy Smith
JAM	Dave Brown
NZL	Jonathan Bredin
NZL	Lisa McPhail
NZL	Yvonne Morgan
NZL	Kristie Simpson
RSA	Theresa Prince
RSA	Marie-Louw Van Der Merwe
TRI	Joel Young-Strong

== Teams ==
=== Qualification ===
Sixteen teams contested the 2015 tournament. The home nation automatically qualified, along with the next five highest-ranked teams from the INF World Rankings.

- Australia (host nation)
- New Zealand
- England
- Jamaica
- Malawi
- South Africa

Qualification Tournaments The remaining ten teams were determined by regional qualifying tournaments, with two teams selected from each of the five international netball regions; Africa, Americas, Asia, Europe and Oceania.

Region	Host	Teams	Dates	Winner	Runner up
Europe	Wales	4	30 May – 1 June 2014	Wales	Scotland
Oceania	Cook Islands	4	2–7 June 2014	Fiji	Samoa
Americas	Canada	8	19–28 August 2014	Trinidad and Tobago	Barbados
Asia	Singapore	10	7–14 September 2014	Singapore	Sri Lanka
Africa	Botswana	8	14–20 September 2014	Uganda	Zambia

=== Draw ===
There was no draw for the tournament, instead the 16 qualified teams were allocated into four pools (A, B, C and D) according to their INF World Rankings of 1 July 2014, as per following criteria:

- Pool A – teams seeded 1, 2, 9, 10
- Pool B – teams seeded 3, 4, 11, 12
- Pool C – teams seeded 5, 6, 13, 14
- Pool D – teams seeded 7, 8, 15, 16
- Subject to a maximum of two teams from the same region per pool, in case of a third team from the same region, they are switched with the closest ranked team from a different pool. After the original allocation, Sri Lanka and Uganda swapped pools to comply with this rule.

Rankings reflect the teams' rankings in July 2014.

Pool A	Pool B	Pool C	Pool D
Australia (1); New Zealand (2); Barbados (9); Trinidad and Tobago (10)	England (3); Jamaica (4); Scotland (11); Samoa (13)	Malawi (5); South Africa (6); Singapore (19); Sri Lanka (24)	Fiji (7); Wales (8); Uganda (15); Zambia (22)

== Format ==
The 2015 tournament consisted of 64 matches played over ten days from 7–16 August. It included three stages – a preliminary pool stage, a qualifying pool stage, and a knockout series of semi-finals and finals. The 16 participating teams were initially divided into four pools (A, B, C and D) of four teams. During the preliminary pool stage, teams in each pool played each other once. In every pool match, two points were awarded to a winning team, while no points were given to a losing team.

The qualification round consisted of two First Eight pools (E and F), which were formed from two teams with the highest number of points in each of the preliminary matches pools, and two Second Eight pools (G and H), formed from the bottom two teams in each of the preliminary matches pools. In this stage, teams in each pool played each other once.

The two teams with the highest number of points in each of the two First Eight pools advanced to the semi-finals. The winners of the semifinals contested the final, while the losers played for the bronze medal (3rd place). The bottom two teams in each of these pools entered a knockout stage to determine fifth to eighth place. The teams from the two Second Eight pools are similarly divided, eventually entering two knockout stages for 9th to 12th place and 13th to 16th place.

== Preliminary round matches ==
=== Pool A ===
Pos	Team	Pld	W	D	L	GF	GA	GD	Pts
1	New Zealand	3	3	0	0	199	113	86	6
2	Australia	3	2	0	1	203	100	103	4
3	Trinidad and Tobago	3	1	0	2	125	186	−61	2
4	Barbados	3	0	0	3	83	211	−128	0

7 August; 16:50 (AEST)	Report	New Zealand	73–28	Barbados	Allphones Arena
7 August; 16:50 (AEST)	Report	Paseka 28/38 (74%); Mes 24/31 (77%); Tutaia 12/15 (80%); Brown 9/12 (75%)		Wharton 14/16 (88%); Piggott 6/6 (100%); Sealy 4/5 (80%); Thomas 4/6 (67%)	Allphones Arena

7 August; 21:05 (AEST)	Report	Australia	73–32	Trinidad and Tobago	Allphones Arena
7 August; 21:05 (AEST)	Report	Thwaites 26/32 (81%); Bell 18/19 (95%); Bassett 17/18 (94%); Medhurst 12/15 (80%)		Wallace 11/14 (79%); McCollin 10/11 (91%); Noel 6/11 (55%); Cooper 5/7 (71%)	Allphones Arena

8 August; 13:20 (AEST)	Report	Trinidad and Tobago	38–74	New Zealand	Allphones Arena
8 August; 13:20 (AEST)	Report	Wallace 24/30 (80%); Cooper 9/11 (82%); McCollin 4/4 (100%); Noel 1/1 (100%)		Mes 21/25 (84%); Paseka 21/27 (78%); Brown 16/20 (80%); Tutaia 16/20 (80%)	Allphones Arena

8 August; 15:20 (AEST)	Report	Barbados	16–83	Australia	Allphones Arena
8 August; 15:20 (AEST)	Report	Wharton 7/13 (54%); Piggott 5/11 (45%); Thomas 4/5 (80%)		Bassett 30/30 (100%); Bell 21/24 (88%); Thwaites 17/18 (94%); Medhurst 15/19 (79%)	Allphones Arena

9 August; 12:20 (AEST)	Report	Trinidad and Tobago	55–39	Barbados	Allphones Arena
9 August; 12:20 (AEST)	Report	Wallace 37/42 (88%); Cooper 18/20 (90%)		Wharton 23/25 (92%); Thomas 7/8 (88%); Piggott 6/8 (75%); Sealy 3/3 (100%)	Allphones Arena

9 August; 14:20 (AEST)	Report	Australia	47–52	New Zealand	Allphones Arena
9 August; 14:20 (AEST)	Report	Bassett 38/43 (88%); Medhurst 6/7 (86%); Bell 3/7 (43%)		Tutaia 34/48 (71%); Mes 18/21 (86%)	Allphones Arena

=== Pool B ===
Pos	Team	Pld	W	D	L	GF	GA	GD	Pts
1	England	3	3	0	0	199	103	96	6
2	Jamaica	3	2	0	1	211	122	89	4
3	Scotland	3	1	0	2	90	167	−77	2
4	Samoa	3	0	0	3	114	222	−108	0

7 August; 10:50 (AEST)	Report	Jamaica	90–44	Samoa	Allphones Arena
7 August; 10:50 (AEST)	Report	Fowler-Reid 39/45 (87%); Aiken 29/32 (91%); Beckford 11/13 (85%); Griffiths 11/16 (69%)		Naoupu 21/26 (81%); Tanimo 15/20 (75%); Too 8/11 (73%)	Allphones Arena

7 August; 14:50 (AEST)	Report	England	60–19	Scotland	Allphones Arena
7 August; 14:50 (AEST)	Report	Dunn 22/23 (96%); Harten 16/22 (73%); Cookey 11/12 (92%); Housby 11/15 (73%)		Sole 13/17 (76%); Pettitt 3/6 (50%); Gallagher 3/7 (43%)	Allphones Arena

8 August; 15:20 (AEST)	Report	Samoa	36–47	Scotland	Netball Central
8 August; 15:20 (AEST)	Report	Tanimo 20/20 (100%); Naoupu 14/14 (100%); Too 2/2 (100%)		Sole 19/28 (68%); Gallagher 15/20 (75%); MacDonald 13/14 (93%)	Netball Central

8 August; 17:20 (AEST)	Report	Jamaica	50–54	England	Allphones Arena
8 August; 17:20 (AEST)	Report	Aiken 27/29 (93%); Beckford 17/20 (85%); Fowler-Reid 6/7 (86%)		Harten 37/46 (80%); Housby 11/13 (85%); Cookey 6/8 (75%)	Allphones Arena

9 August; 16:20 (AEST)	Report	England	85–34	Samoa	Allphones Arena
9 August; 16:20 (AEST)	Report	Harten 30/35 (86%); Housby 26/29 (90%); Cookey 17/17 (100%); Dunn 12/16 (75%)		Tanimo 17/18 (94%); Tuipulotu 8/10 (80%); Too 7/9 (78%); Naoupu 2/5 (40%)	Allphones Arena

10 August; 19:20 (AEST)	Report	Scotland	24–71	Jamaica	Allphones Arena
10 August; 19:20 (AEST)	Report	Pettitt 9/15 (60%); Sole 8/14 (57%); Gallagher 7/11 (64%)		Fowler-Reid 59/62 (95%); Griffiths 12/14 (86%)	Allphones Arena

=== Pool C ===
Pos	Team	Pld	W	D	L	GF	GA	GD	Pts
1	Malawi	3	3	0	0	234	100	134	6
2	South Africa	3	2	0	1	209	96	113	4
3	Singapore	3	1	0	2	108	187	−79	2
4	Sri Lanka	3	0	0	3	78	246	−168	0

7 August; 11:50 (AEST)	Report	Singapore	56–43	Sri Lanka	Netball Central
7 August; 11:50 (AEST)	Report	Soh 39/55 (71%); Chen 17/25 (68%)		Algama 34/39 (87%); Alwis 9/11 (82%)	Netball Central

7 August; 12:50 (AEST)	Report	Malawi	58–51	South Africa	Allphones Arena
7 August; 12:50 (AEST)	Report	Kumwenda 40/43 (93%); Simtowe 18/24 (75%)		Potgieter 43/48 (90%); Holtzhausen 8/14 (57%)	Allphones Arena

8 August; 17:20 (AEST)	Report	South Africa	69–21	Singapore	Netball Central
8 August; 17:20 (AEST)	Report	Potgieter 39/45 (87%) du Plessis 19/27 (70%); Holtzhausen 11/14 (79%)		Soh 11/18 (61%); Yu 6/9 (67%); Chen 4/6 (67%)	Netball Central

8 August; 19:20 (AEST)	Report	Sri Lanka	18–101	Malawi	Allphones Arena
8 August; 19:20 (AEST)	Report	Alwis 7/8 (88%); Mendis 6/11 (55%); Algama 5/9 (56%)		Kumwenda 32/36 (89%); Mvula 28/31 (90%); Chimaliro 21/22 (95%); Simtowe 20/22 (91%)	Allphones Arena

9 August; 18:20 (AEST)	Report	Malawi	75–31	Singapore	Allphones Arena
9 August; 18:20 (AEST)	Report	Kumwenda 39/43 (91%); Simtowe 23/24 (96%); Chimaliro 7/7 (100%); Mvula 6/9 (67%)		Soh 23/31 (74%); Chen 5/10 (50%); Yu 3/4 (75%)	Allphones Arena

10 August; 12:20 (AEST)	Report	South Africa	89–17	Sri Lanka	Allphones Arena
10 August; 12:20 (AEST)	Report	Potgieter 43/46 (93%); Holtzhausen 21/24 (88%); Lombard 14/19 (74%) du Plessis 11/11 (100%)		Algama 13/17 (76%); Alwis 3/7 (43%); Mendis 1/4 (25%)	Allphones Arena

=== Pool D ===
Pos	Team	Pld	W	D	L	GF	GA	GD	Pts
1	Wales	3	3	0	0	179	143	36	6
2	Uganda	3	2	0	1	182	127	55	4
3	Fiji	3	1	0	2	151	171	−20	2
4	Zambia	3	0	0	3	133	204	−71	0

7 August; 9:50 (AEST)	Report	Fiji	52–59	Wales	Netball Central
7 August; 9:50 (AEST)	Report	Mitchell 35/35 (100%); Rusivakula 17/25 (68%)		Lewis 31/39 (79%); Thomas 28/28 (100%)	Netball Central

7 August; 13:50 (AEST)	Report	Uganda	74–38	Zambia	Netball Central
7 August; 13:50 (AEST)	Report	Proscovia 56/62 (90%); Nanyonga 10/14 (71%); Oyella 8/9 (89%)		Jere 22/24 (92%); Banda 11/11 (100%); Bwalya 5/6 (83%)	Netball Central

8 August; 11:20 (AEST)	Report	Uganda	61–40	Fiji	Allphones Arena
8 August; 11:20 (AEST)	Report	Proscovia 37/45 (82%); Nanyonga 24/29 (83%)		Mitchell 27/30 (90%); Rusivakula 8/12 (67%); Rauluni 5/8 (63%)	Allphones Arena

9 August; 10:20 (AEST)	Report	Wales	71–44	Zambia	Allphones Arena
9 August; 10:20 (AEST)	Report	Lewis 44/49 (90%); Thomas 13/14 (93%); Rowe 12/12 (100%); Bell 2/5 (40%)		Jere 31/37 (84%); Bwalya 11/18 (61%); Banda 2/4 (50%)	Allphones Arena

10 August; 15:20 (AEST)	Report	Zambia	51–59	Fiji	Allphones Arena
10 August; 15:20 (AEST)	Report	Jere 31/39 (79%); Banda 16/19 (84%); Bwalya 4/5 (80%)		Mitchell 41/47 (87%); Rusivakula 18/25 (72%)	Allphones Arena

10 August; 17:20 (AEST)	Report	Uganda	47–49	Wales	Allphones Arena
10 August; 17:20 (AEST)	Report	Proscovia 26/32 (81%); Nanyonga 21/23 (91%)		Lewis 35/42 (83%); Thomas 14/14 (100%)	Allphones Arena

== Qualification round matches ==
=== Pool E ===
Pos	Team	Pld	W	D	L	GF	GA	GD	Pts
1	New Zealand	3	3	0	0	188	130	58	6
2	Jamaica	3	2	0	1	170	164	6	4
3	Malawi	3	1	0	2	170	173	−3	2
4	Uganda	3	0	0	3	133	194	−61	0

11 August; 14:20 (AEST)	Report	Malawi	59–53	Uganda	Netball Central
11 August; 14:20 (AEST)	Report	Kumwenda 48/53 (91%); Simtowe 11/13 (85%)		Proscovia 38/39 (97%); Nanyonga 15/18 (83%)	Netball Central

11 August; 18:20 (AEST)	Report	New Zealand	55–48	Jamaica	Allphones Arena
11 August; 18:20 (AEST)	Report	Tutaia 36/43 (84%); Mes 19/25 (76%)		Aiken 41/44 (93%); Beckford 7/9 (78%)	Allphones Arena

12 August; 18:20 (AEST)	Report	New Zealand	57–49	Malawi	Allphones Arena
12 August; 18:20 (AEST)	Report	Mes 33/38 (87%); Brown 16/19 (84%); Tutaia 8/9 (89%)		Kumwenda 38/42 (90%); Simtowe 11/13 (85%)	Allphones Arena

13 August; 14:20 (AEST)	Report	Jamaica	59–47	Uganda	Allphones Arena
13 August; 14:20 (AEST)	Report	Fowler-Reid 23/25 (92%); Aiken 16/16 (100%); Beckford 15/16 (94%); Griffiths 5/7 (71%)		Nanyonga 29/34 (85%); Proscovia 18/24 (75%)	Allphones Arena

14 August; 12:20 (AEST)	Report	Jamaica	63–62	Malawi	Allphones Arena
14 August; 12:20 (AEST)	Report	Aiken 44/48 (92%); Beckford 17/18 (94%); Griffiths 2/3 (67%)		Kumwenda 39/41 (95%); Simtowe 23/23 (100%)	Allphones Arena

14 August; 18:20 (AEST)	Report	New Zealand	76–33	Uganda	Allphones Arena
14 August; 18:20 (AEST)	Report	Paseka 49/55 (89%); Brown 22/29 (76%); Tutaia 5/7 (71%)		Proscovia 19/22 (86%); Nanyonga 11/18 (61%); Amono 2/4 (50%); Oyella 1/2 (50%)	Allphones Arena

=== Pool F ===
Pos	Team	Pld	W	D	L	GF	GA	GD	Pts
1	Australia	3	3	0	0	206	96	110	6
2	England	3	2	0	1	181	130	51	4
3	South Africa	3	1	0	2	145	168	−23	2
4	Wales	3	0	0	3	97	235	−138	0

11 August; 12:20 (AEST)	Report	South Africa	68–40	Wales	Allphones Arena
11 August; 12:20 (AEST)	Report	Potgieter 49/57 (86%) du Plessis 13/16 (81%); Holtzhausen 6/8 (75%)		Lewis 29/32 (91%); Thomas 8/11 (73%); Bell 3/4 (75%)	Allphones Arena

11 August; 20:20 (AEST)	Report	Australia	51–41	England	Allphones Arena
11 August; 20:20 (AEST)	Report	Bassett 28/32 (88%); Medhurst 14/18 (78%); Thwaites 9/13 (69%)		Harten 30/33 (91%); Housby 6/9 (67%); Cookey 5/6 (83%)	Allphones Arena

12 August; 16:20 (AEST)	Report	England	78–33	Wales	Allphones Arena
12 August; 16:20 (AEST)	Report	Harten 28/29 (97%); Dunn 21/31 (68%); Cookey 15/15 (100%); Housby 14/15 (93%)		Rowe 16/21 (76%); Lewis 7/8 (88%); Thomas 7/8 (88%); Bell 3/6 (50%)	Allphones Arena

12 August; 20:20 (AEST)	Report	Australia	66–31	South Africa	Allphones Arena
12 August; 20:20 (AEST)	Report	Bell 33/35 (94%); Thwaites 33/38 (87%)		Potgieter 21/27 (78%) du Plessis 7/12 (58%); Holtzhausen 2/2 (100%); Lombard 1/3 (33%)	Allphones Arena

14 August; 16:20 (AEST)	Report	England	62–46	South Africa	Allphones Arena
14 August; 16:20 (AEST)	Report	Harten 35/39 (90%); Housby 14/15 (93%); Cookey 13/14 (93%)		Potgieter 35/38 (92%); Holtzhausen 11/22 (50%)	Allphones Arena

14 August; 20:20 (AEST)	Report	Australia	89–24	Wales	Allphones Arena
14 August; 20:20 (AEST)	Report	Thwaites 43/46 (93%); Bell 24/26 (92%); Bassett 15/19 (79%); Medhurst 7/8 (88%)		Lewis 14/16 (88%); Rowe 8/8 (100%); Bell 1/4 (25%); Thomas 1/4 (25%)	Allphones Arena

=== Pool G ===
Pos	Team	Pld	W	D	L	GF	GA	GD	Pts
1	Trinidad and Tobago	3	3	0	0	208	118	90	6
2	Samoa	3	2	0	1	148	159	−11	4
3	Zambia	3	1	0	2	159	157	2	2
4	Singapore	3	0	0	3	107	188	−81	0

11 August; 10:20 (AEST)	Report	Samoa	46–39	Singapore	Allphones Arena
11 August; 10:20 (AEST)	Report	Naoupu 24/27 (89%); Tanimo 17/20 (85%); Too 5/5 (100%)		Soh 26/34 (76%); Yu 11/19 (58%); Chen 2/4 (50%)	Allphones Arena

11 August; 12:20 (AEST)	Report	Trinidad and Tobago	66–39	Zambia	Netball Central
11 August; 12:20 (AEST)	Report	Wallace 30/34 (88%); McCollin 17/19 (89%); Noel 12/15 (80%); Cooper 7/8 (88%)		Jere 14/17 (82%); Banda 13/16 (81%); Bwalya 12/18 (67%)	Netball Central

12 August; 10:20 (AEST)	Report	Trinidad and Tobago	75–32	Singapore	Allphones Arena
12 August; 10:20 (AEST)	Report	Wallace 27/31 (87%); McCollin 26/27 (96%); Cooper 14/14 (100%); Noel 8/10 (80%)		Soh 17/24 (71%); Chen 8/8 (100%); Liew 4/6 (67%); Yu 3/5 (60%)	Allphones Arena

12 August; 14:20 (AEST)	Report	Samoa	55–53	Zambia	Allphones Arena
12 August; 14:20 (AEST)	Report	Tanimo 26/30 (87%); Naoupu 23/25 (92%); Too 6/8 (75%)		Jere 34/39 (87%); Banda 18/20 (90%); Bwalya 1/1 (100%)	Allphones Arena

13 August; 20:20 (AEST)	Report	Trinidad and Tobago	67–47	Samoa	Allphones Arena
13 August; 20:20 (AEST)	Report	Wallace 49/59 (83%); McCollin 15/16 (94%); Cooper 3/3 (100%)		Tanimo 17/18 (94%); Tuipulotu 15/18 (83%); Too 15/26 (58%)	Allphones Arena

14 August; 14:20 (AEST)	Report	Singapore	36–67	Zambia	Allphones Arena
14 August; 14:20 (AEST)	Report	Chen 15/24 (63%); Yu 14/22 (64%); Soh 7/13 (54%)		Jere 34/36 (94%); Bwalya 17/18 (94%); Banda 16/19 (84%)	Allphones Arena

=== Pool H ===
Pos	Team	Pld	W	D	L	GF	GA	GD	Pts
1	Fiji	3	3	0	0	173	110	63	6
2	Scotland	3	2	0	1	138	109	29	4
3	Barbados	3	1	0	2	138	118	20	2
4	Sri Lanka	3	0	0	3	91	203	−112	0

11 August; 14:20 (AEST)	Report	Sri Lanka	31–77	Fiji	Allphones Arena
11 August; 14:20 (AEST)	Report	Mendis 18/29 (62%); Alwis 10/15 (67%); Abeywickrama 2/5 (40%); Algama 1/3 (33%)		Rusivakula 32/43 (74%); Rauluni 30/36 (83%); Mitchell 15/15 (100%)	Allphones Arena

11 August; 16:20 (AEST)	Report	Barbados	34–37	Scotland	Allphones Arena
11 August; 16:20 (AEST)	Report	Piggott 17/21 (81%); Sealy 10/15 (67%); Wharton 7/7 (100%)		Gallagher 14/18 (78%); MacDonald 14/19 (74%); Sole 9/14 (64%)	Allphones Arena

12 August; 12:20 (AEST)	Report	Barbados	37–48	Fiji	Netball Central
12 August; 12:20 (AEST)	Report	Sealy 12/15 (80%); Wharton 12/16 (75%); Piggott 9/12 (75%); Thomas 4/8 (50%)		Mitchell 35/40 (88%); Rusivakula 13/19 (68%)	Netball Central

12 August; 12:20 (AEST)	Report	Scotland	59–27	Sri Lanka	Allphones Arena
12 August; 12:20 (AEST)	Report	Sole 25/34 (74%); McNeill 20/29 (69%); Pettitt 14/22 (64%)		Algama 23/34 (68%); Alwis 3/4 (75%); Mendis 1/5 (20%)	Allphones Arena

13 August; 16:20 (AEST)	Report	Barbados	67–33	Sri Lanka	Allphones Arena
13 August; 16:20 (AEST)	Report	Sealy 35/46 (76%); Thomas 15/22 (68%); Wharton 11/14 (79%); Piggott 6/6 (100%)		Mendis 17/26 (65%); Algama 13/19 (68%); Alwis 3/4 (75%)	Allphones Arena

13 August; 18:20 (AEST)	Report	Scotland	42–48	Fiji	Allphones Arena
13 August; 18:20 (AEST)	Report	Sole 26/39 (67%); MacDonald 9/15 (60%); Gallagher 7/10 (70%)		Mitchell 32/35 (91%); Rusivakula 16/19 (84%)	Allphones Arena

== Play-off matches ==
5th to 8th

15 August; 16:30 (AEST)	Report	Malawi	71–52	Wales	Allphones Arena
15 August; 16:30 (AEST)	Report	Kumwenda 49/53 (92%); Simtowe 15/17 (88%); Chimaliro 6/6 (100%); Mvula 1/1 (100%)		Lewis 40/45 (89%); Thomas 7/10 (70%); Rowe 5/5 (100%)	Allphones Arena

15 August; 17:15 (AEST)	Report	South Africa	50–40	Uganda	Netball Central
15 August; 17:15 (AEST)	Report	Potgieter 36/38 (95%); Holtzhausen 14/17 (82%)		Nanyonga 22/29 (76%); Proscovia 18/24 (75%)	Netball Central

9th to 12th

15 August; 09:30 (AEST)	Report	Fiji	51–54	Samoa	Netball Central
15 August; 09:30 (AEST)	Report	Mitchell 33/34 (97%); Rusivakula 18/23 (78%)		Naoupu 35/42 (83%); Tanimo 11/14 (79%); Too 8/11 (73%)	Netball Central

15 August; 09:35 (AEST)	Report	Trinidad and Tobago	57–56 (aet)	Scotland	Netball Central
15 August; 09:35 (AEST)	Report	Wallace 49/54 (91%); Cooper 6/9 (67%); McCollin 2/2 (100%)		Gallagher 31/40 (78%); MacDonald 19/21 (90%); Sole 6/7 (86%)	Netball Central

13th to 16th

15 August; 10:00 (AEST)	Report	Barbados	56–39	Singapore	Allphones Arena
15 August; 10:00 (AEST)	Report	Sealy 43/49 (88%); Piggott 12/15 (80%); Thomas 1/3 (33%)		Soh 28/34 (82%); Chen 7/10 (70%); Liew 3/4 (75%); Yu 1/1 (100%)	Allphones Arena

15 August; 17:15 (AEST)	Report	Zambia	70–36	Sri Lanka	Netball Central
15 August; 17:15 (AEST)	Report	Bwalya 28/34 (82%); Banda 22/24 (92%); Jere 20/21 (95%)		Algama 29/31 (94%); Mendis 7/9 (78%)	Netball Central

== Placement matches ==
5th place

16 August; 11:00 (AEST)	Report	Malawi	46–48	South Africa	Allphones Arena
16 August; 11:00 (AEST)	Report	Kumwenda 36/41 (88%); Simtowe 10/11 (91%)		Potgieter 32/34 (94%); Holtzhausen 16/22 (73%)	Allphones Arena

7th place

16 August; 10:50 (AEST)	Report	Wales	64–41	Uganda	Netball Central
16 August; 10:50 (AEST)	Report	Rowe 32/38 (84%); Lewis 31/35 (89%); Thomas 1/1 (100%)		Proscovia 31/34 (91%); Nanyonga 4/5 (80%); Oyella 6/6 (100%)	Netball Central

9th place

16 August; 08:50 (AEST)	Report	Trinidad and Tobago	64–51	Samoa	Netball Central
16 August; 08:50 (AEST)	Report	Wallace 53/60 (88%); Cooper 11/12 (92%)		Naoupu 32/36 (89%); Too 19/25 (76%)	Netball Central

11th place

16 August; 08:55 (AEST)	Report	Fiji	51–41	Scotland	Netball Central
16 August; 08:55 (AEST)	Report	Mitchell 29/31 (94%); Rusivakula 22/26 (85%)		Gallagher 22/27 (81%); MacDonald 17/18 (94%); Sole 2/5 (40%)	Netball Central

13th place

16 August; 08:50 (AEST)	Report	Barbados	53–38	Zambia	Allphones Arena
16 August; 08:50 (AEST)	Report	Wharton 22/25 (88%); Sealy 20/23 (87%); Piggott 11/13 (85%)		Bwalya 17/24 (71%); Banda 10/15 (67%); Jere 7/12 (58%); Moono 4/8 (50%)	Allphones Arena

15th place

16 August; 10:55 (AEST)	Report	Singapore	59–32	Sri Lanka	Netball Central
16 August; 10:55 (AEST)	Report	Soh 41/50 (82%); Chen 8/11 (73%); Yu 5/8 (63%); Liew 5/11 (45%)		Mendis 15/19 (79%); Algama 11/13 (85%); Abeywickrama 6/9 (67%)	Netball Central

== Semi-finals and medal matches ==
At the conclusion of qualifying pool play Australia, England, Jamaica and New Zealand advanced into the semi-finals. This was the fifth time in the last five tournaments that the world's top four ranked sides had reached the semi-final stage. New Zealand led England throughout the first semi-final, pulling away in the last fifteen minutes to post a 50 points to 39 win. In the other semi final Australia eased past Jamaica 67 to 56, outpointing them in three of the four-quarters.

In the final Australia outplayed New Zealand in the first quarter to lead 16–7. Despite winning each of the next three-quarters New Zealand were unable to make up the difference. Australia extended their lead to 12 goals early in the second quarter, before New Zealand played their way back into the game. At half-time the score was 30 to 22 and at the start of the last quarter 43 to 37. With a minute remaining Australia led by just three goals, but were able to hold their nerve to record a 58 to 55 goal victory.

The defensive work of captain Laura Geitz and Julie Corletto along with accurate goal shooting from Caitlin Bassett helped set up the Australian win. New Zealand goal attack Maria Tutaia said they were too complacent in the first quarter and could not handle the defensive pressure from Australia. Geitz praised her attackers for capitalising on every opportunity and also said that the "first quarter set us up nicely." The Australians shooters scored goals at a 91 percent success rate while their defenders held the New Zealanders to just 73 percent. Corletto retired after the game, ending a twelve-year career that includes 53 tests and three world titles. Australia has now won the World Cup three times in a row and eleven times in total. In the bronze medal match England beat Jamaica 66–44.

Semi finals
15 August
New Zealand	50
England	39
15 August
Australia	67
Jamaica	56

Final
16 August
New Zealand	55
Australia	58
Bronze medal match
16 August
England	66
Jamaica	44

=== Semi-finals ===
15 August; 12:10 (AEST)	Report	New Zealand	50–39	England	Allphones Arena
15 August; 12:10 (AEST)	Report	Tutaia 35/42 (83%); Mes 15/22 (68%)		Harten 31/36 (86%); Cookey 7/10 (70%); Housby 1/4 (25%)	Allphones Arena

15 August; 14:20 (AEST)	Report	Australia	67–56	Jamaica	Allphones Arena
15 August; 14:20 (AEST)	Report	Bassett 49/52 (94%); Medhurst 18/19 (95%)		Aiken 33/36 (92%); Beckford 14/16 (88%); Fowler-Reid 9/10 (90%)	Allphones Arena

=== Bronze medal match ===
16 August; 13:10 (AEST)	Report	England	66–44	Jamaica	Allphones Arena
16 August; 13:10 (AEST)	Report	Harten 52/59 (88%); Cookey 14/18 (78%)		Aiken 26/28 (93%); Fowler-Reid 12/13 (92%); Beckford 6/6 (100%)	Allphones Arena

=== Gold medal match ===
16 August; 15:20 (AEST)	Report	New Zealand	55–58	Australia	Allphones Arena
16 August; 15:20 (AEST)	Report	Scoring by quarter: 7–16, 15–14, 15–13, 14–15			Allphones Arena
16 August; 15:20 (AEST)	Report	Tutaia 38/53 (72%); Mes 17/22 (77%)		Bassett 48/51 (94%); Medhurst 10/13 (77%)	Allphones Arena

== Final placings ==
Place	Nation
Gold	Australia
Silver	New Zealand
Bronze	England
4	Jamaica
5	South Africa
6	Malawi
7	Wales
8	Uganda
9	Trinidad and Tobago
10	Samoa
11	Fiji
12	Scotland
13	Barbados
14	Zambia
15	Singapore
16	Sri Lanka

== Medallists ==
Gold	Silver	Bronze
Australia; Coach: Lisa Alexander	New Zealand; Coach: Waimarama Taumaunu	England; Coach: Tracey Neville
Caitlin Thwaites; Natalie Medhurst; Erin Bell; Paige Hadley; Julie Corletto; Rebecca Bulley; Sharni Layton; Caitlin Bassett; Kimberlee Green; Kim Ravaillion; Renae Hallinan; Laura Geitz	Malia Paseka; Jodi Brown; Grace Rasmussen; Kayla Cullen; Leana de Bruin; Phoenix Karaka; Bailey Mes; Shannon Francois; Katrina Grant; Maria Tutaia; Laura Langman; Casey Kopua	Joanne Harten; Helen Housby; Tamsin Greenway; Jade Clarke; Serena Guthrie; Sonia Mkoloma; Eboni Beckford-Chambers; Pamela Cookey; Geva Mentor; Sara Bayman; Rachel Dunn; Stacey Francis
