= Margaret Baagala =

Ugandan netball player

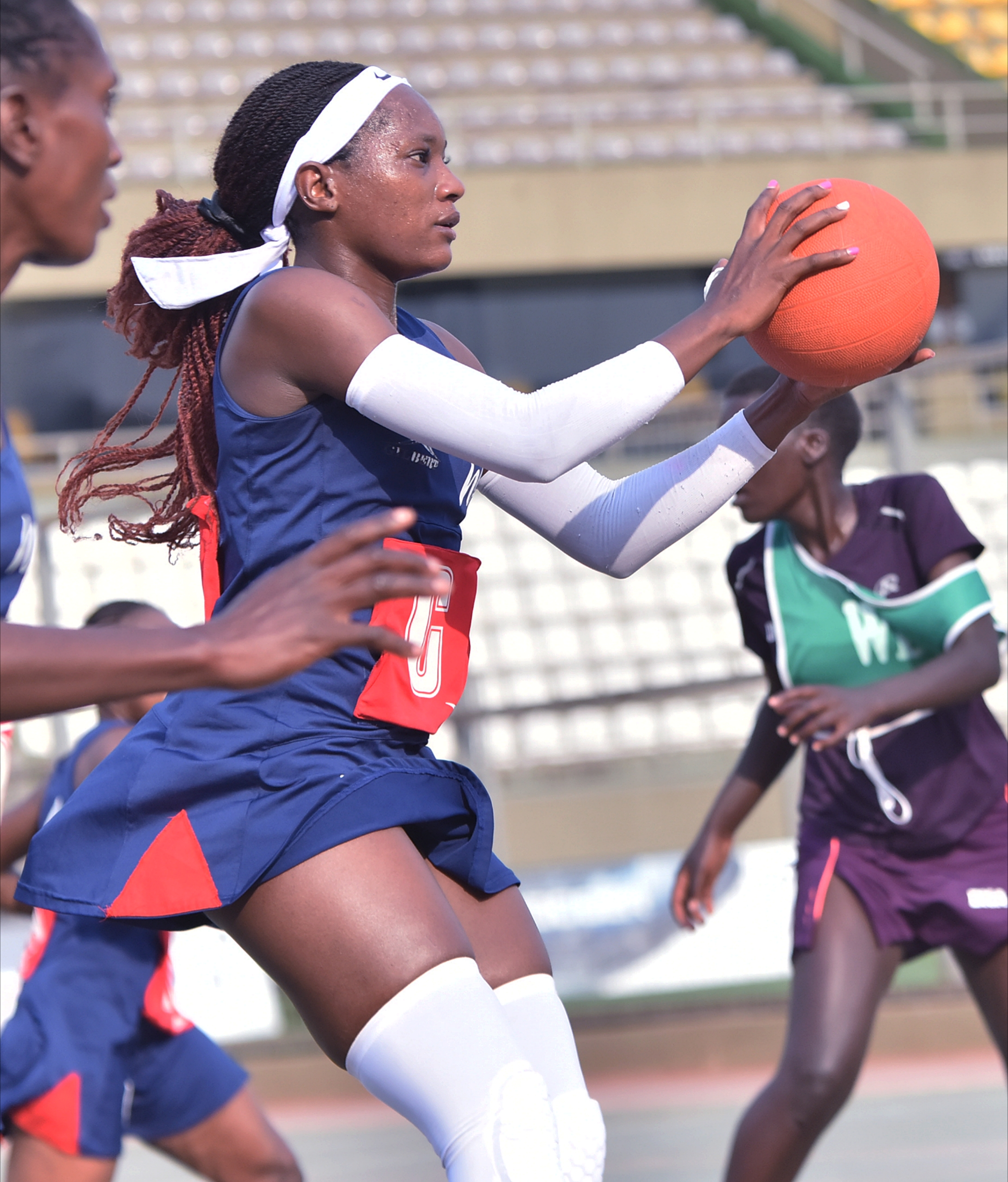

Personal information
- Full name: Margaret Baagala
- Born: 9 May 2002 (age 24) Uganda
- Height: 5.6 ft (171 cm)
- School: St. Mary's Kitende
- University: Kampala University

Netball career
- Playing position: Center
Years	Club team	Apps
2021–Present	NIC Netball Club	
Years	National team	Caps
2021, Present	Uganda national netball team	
Medal record
Representing Uganda
Uganda Netball Premier League

Margaret Baagala (born 9 May 2002) is a professional Ugandan netball player who plays for the NIC Netball club in the Uganda Netball Premier League and the Uganda national netball team, also known as the She Cranes, where she plays center. She is also a basketball player for the Kampala City Council Authority women's Basketball club in the National Basketball League.

== Career ==
=== School career ===
She attended Kakungulu Memorial School between 2014 and 2015 before joining St. Mary's Boarding Secondary School, where she represented them in national School Championships and East Africa championships between 2016 and 2019.

=== NIC ===
In 2021, Margaret joined the NIC Netball Club. She won one league trophy with the club in 2021, nominated as one of the season's best players. She won the East Africa Netball championship in 2022,2023,2024, and 2025.

=== Kampala University ===
In September 2021, Margaret joined Kampala University on a Mass Communication diploma and graduated in 2023. She won the East African University Games for the University in 2022.

== National team ==
Margaret debuted for the Uganda national netball team during the 2021 Africa Netball Cup. She represented Uganda in the Netball at the 2022 Commonwealth Games in England and played five matches. She also featured for Uganda in the Netball Test Series in 2022 and was part of the Ugandan squad that played the 2022 Fast5 Netball World Series in New Zealand. Margaret played seven matches for Uganda in the 2023 Netball World Cup.

== Honors ==
- Best Center player in Uganda Netball Premier League: 2021
- Best player of the month of December: 2024

== Achievements ==
- USSSA Ball Games II champion with St Mary's Boarding Secondary School, Kitende: 2016
- FEASSSA Games champion with St Mary's Boarding Secondary School, Kitende: 2016
- USSSA Ball Games II Champion with St Mary's Boarding Secondary School, Kitende: 2017
- FEASSSA Games champion with St Mary's Boarding Secondary School, Kitende: 2017
- USSSA Ball Games II champion with St Mary's Boarding Secondary School, Kitende: 2018
- USSSA Ball Games II champion with St Mary's Boarding Secondary School, Kitende: 2019
- FEASSSA Games champion with St Mary's Boarding Secondary School, Kitende: 2019
- Uganda Netball Premier League champion: 2021
- East Africa University Games champion with Kampala University: 2022
- East Africa Netball Championship winner with NIC Netball Club: 2022
- East Africa Netball Championship winner with NIC Netball Club: 2023
- East Africa Netball Championship winner with NIC Netball Club: 2024
- East Africa Netball Championship winner with NIC Netball Club: 2025
