= Premier Netball League =

Premier Netball League or Netball Premier League may refer to one of several netball leagues. These include:

== Africa ==
- Uganda Netball Premier League
- Premier Netball League (South Africa)

== Australia ==
- Netball South Australia Premier League
- Netball NSW Premier League

== England ==
- National Premier League
