= Athletics at the 2018 Commonwealth Games – Women's 5000 metres =

Women's 5000 metres at the 2018 Commonwealth Games
- Venue: Carrara Stadium
- Dates: 14 April 2018
- Competitors: 19 from 12 nations
- Winning time: 15:13.11

Medalists
gold medal	Hellen Obiri	Kenya
silver medal	Margaret Chelimo Kipkemboi	Kenya
bronze medal	Laura Weightman	England

The women's 5000 metres at the 2018 Commonwealth Games, as part of the athletics programme, took place in the Carrara Stadium on 14 April 2018.

== Records ==
Prior to this competition, the existing world and Games records were as follows:

World record	Tirunesh Dibaba (ETH)	14:11.15	Oslo, Norway	6 June 2008
Games record	Paula Radcliffe (ENG)	14:31.42	Manchester, England	28 July 2002

== Schedule ==
The schedule was as follows:

Date	Time	Round
Saturday 14 April 2018	15:20	Final

All times are Australian Eastern Standard Time (UTC+10)

== Results ==
With nineteen entrants, the event was held as a straight final.

=== Final ===
Rank	Order	Name	Result	Notes
1st place, gold medalist(s)	2	Hellen Obiri (KEN)	15:13.11	
2nd place, silver medalist(s)	11	Margaret Chelimo Kipkemboi (KEN)	15:15.28	
3rd place, bronze medalist(s)	13	Laura Weightman (ENG)	15:25.84	
4	6	Juliet Chekwel (UGA)	15:30.17	SB
5	7	Celia Sullohern (AUS)	15:34.73	
6	9	Eilish McColgan (SCO)	15:34.88	
7	17	Eva Cherono (KEN)	15:36.10	PB
8	1	Eloise Wellings (AUS)	15:39.02	
9	8	Melissa Courtney (WAL)	15:46.60	
10	4	Madeline Hills (AUS)	15:46.92	
11	19	Mercyline Chelangat (UGA)	15:50.01	
12	5	Camille Buscomb (NZL)	15:55.45	
13	15	Emma Mitchell (NIR)	16:02.80	
14	12	Stephanie Twell (SCO)	16:05.65	
15	18	Failuna Abdi Matanga (TAN)	16:07.99	
16	3	Sarah Mercier (GGY)	17:00.52	
17	14	Mokulubete Makatisi (LES)	17:35.72	
18	10	Lineo Chaka (LES)	18:35.38	
19	16	Sharon Firisua (SOL)	18:52.57	
