= Lilian Ajio =

Ugandan netball player (born 1984)

Personal information
- Born: December 6, 1984 (age 41) Arua, Uganda
- Occupation: netball player
- Height: 1.77 m (5 ft 9 1/2 in)

Netball career
- Playing position: goal defense

Lilian Ajio (born 6 December 1984) is a Ugandan netball player who represents Uganda internationally and plays in the position of goal defense. She has represented Uganda at the 2018 Commonwealth Games and at the 2019 Netball World Cup.
