= Eloise Wellings =

Australian long-distance runner

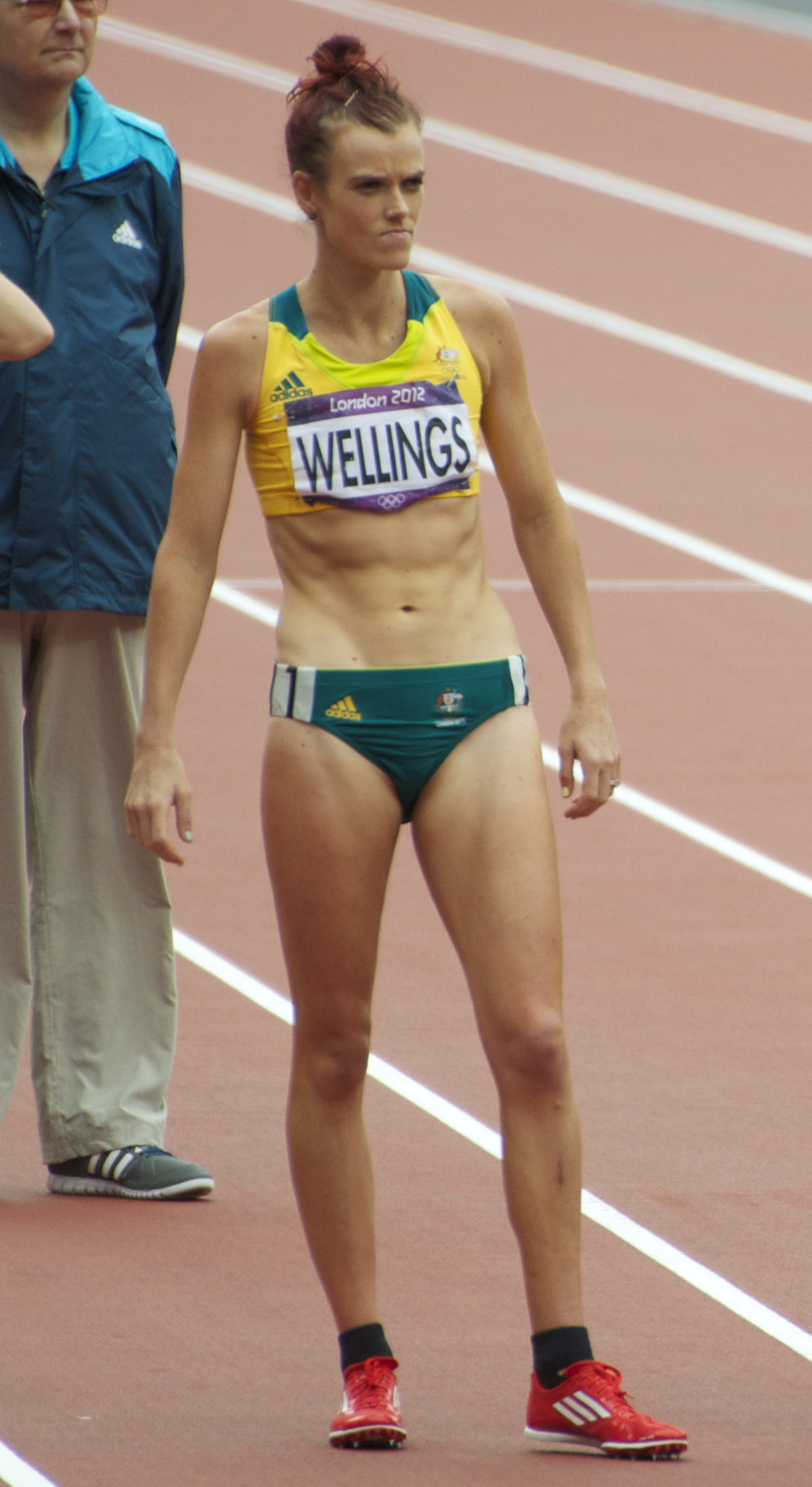
Eloise Wellings at the 2012 Summer Olympics

Eloise Wellings (née Poppett) (born 9 November 1982 in White Plains, New York, United States) is an Australian long-distance runner. She represented her country at the 2006 Commonwealth Games in Melbourne, the 2010 edition in New Delhi and the 2014 edition in Glasgow, and the 2012 Summer Olympics. In 2016, she made the finals of both the 5,000m and 10,000m races at 2016 Summer Olympics.

She was the gold medalist over 5000 metres at the 2003 Summer Universiade. She has also competed internationally in cross country running – her best finish to date was 22nd in the long race at the 2006 IAAF World Cross Country Championships.

She won two consecutive titles at the Zatopek 10,000 metres in 2009, 2010 and 2015.

== Personal life ==
Wellings is a Christian. She stated that she missed out on the Sydney 2000 Olympics due to an injury and thought her God was punishing her. She went to church with a school friend and began to understand her God's love for her. She stated, "Once I found Jesus I was free to use the gifts he had given me and it didn’t matter if I succeeded or not". Wellings also missed out on the Athens and Beijing Olympics due to injury. However, she states, "All of my disappointing results and disappointing injuries and heartbreak missing three Olympics, there was always this belief and faith that my identity is in Jesus and that’s my foundation. When you’ve got that, you can’t be shaken. Every time I get up to train, I just ask that he be glorified, that he give me the strength to do it, that he help give me the right thoughts to think – and not necessarily that I win but that he would be made known to people as I run".

== Achievements ==
Year	Competition	Venue	Position	Notes
Representing Australia
1998	World Junior Championships	Annecy, France	11th	3000 m
1999	World Youth Championships	Bydgoszcz, Poland	4th	3000 m
2003	Universiade	Daegu, South Korea	1st	5000 m
2006	Commonwealth Games	Melbourne, Australia	4th	5000 m
2006	World Athletics Final	Stuttgart, Germany	8th	3000 m
2006	World Cup	Athens, Greece	4th	3000 m
2010	Commonwealth Games	New Delhi, India	6th	10,000 m
2014	Commonwealth Games	Glasgow, Scotland	5th	5,000 m
2015	World Championships	Beijing, China	10th	5000 m
2016	Olympic Games	Rio de Janeiro, Brazil	9th	5000 m
2016	Olympic Games	Rio de Janeiro, Brazil	10th	10,000 m
2017	World Championships	London, United Kingdom	22nd	10,000 m
2018	Commonwealth Games	Gold Coast, Queensland	8th	5,000 m
2018	Commonwealth Games	Gold Coast, Queensland	16th	10,000 m

=== Personal bests ===
- 1500 metres – 4:13.63 min (2006)
- 3000 metres – 8:41.78 min (2006)
- 5000 metres – 14:54.11 min (2006)
- 10,000 metres – 31:14.94 min (2016)
- Marathon – 2:25:10 (2022)
