= Celia Sullohern =

Australian long-distance runner

Personal information
- Born: 5 July 1992 (age 33)

Sport
- Country: Australia
- Event: Long-distance running

Celia Sullohern (born 5 July 1992) is an Australian long-distance runner.

In 2011, she competed in the junior women's race at the 2011 IAAF World Cross Country Championships held in Punta Umbría, Spain. She finished in 21st place.

In 2013, she competed in the senior women's race at the 2013 IAAF World Cross Country Championships held in Bydgoszcz, Poland. She finished in 91st place.

In 2018, she represented Australia at the 2018 Commonwealth Games held in Gold Coast, Australia and she competed in the women's 5000 metres and women's 10,000 metres events. In the 5000 metres event she finished in 5th place and in the 10,000 metres event she finished in 6th place.
