= Sheniqua Thomas =

Barbadian netball player

Personal information
- Born: 18 May 1998 (age 26)
- Height: 1.73 m (5 ft 8 in)
- Occupation: netball player

Netball career
- Playing position(s): goal attack, goal shooter

Sheniqua Thomas (born 18 May 1998) is a Barbadian netball player who represents Barbados internationally and plays in the positions of goal attack and goal shooter. She competed at the Netball World Cup on two occasions in 2015 and 2019. She also represented Barbados at the Commonwealth Games in 2014, which also marked her maiden Commonwealth Games appearance.
