= Athletics at the 2018 Commonwealth Games – Women's 10,000 metres =

Athletics programme

Women's 10,000 metres at the 2018 Commonwealth Games
- Venue: Carrara Stadium
- Dates: 9 April
- Competitors: 19 from 12 nations
- Winning time: 31:45.30

Medalists
gold medal	Stella Chesang	Uganda
silver medal	Stacy Ndiwa	Kenya
bronze medal	Mercyline Chelangat	Uganda

The women's 10,000 metres at the 2018 Commonwealth Games, as part of the athletics programme, took place in the Carrara Stadium on 9 April 2018.

== Records ==
Prior to this competition, the existing world and Games records were as follows:

World record	Almaz Ayana (ETH)	29:17.45	Rio de Janeiro, Brazil	12 August 2016
Games record	Salina Kosgei (KEN)	31:27.83	Manchester, England	30 July 2002

== Schedule ==
The schedule was as follows:

Date	Time	Round
Monday 9 April 2018	20:35	Final

All times are Australian Eastern Standard Time (UTC+10)

== Results ==
With nineteen entrants, the event was held as a straight final.

=== Final ===
Rank	Order	Name	Result	Notes
1st place, gold medalist(s)	2	Stella Chesang (UGA)	31:45.30	
2nd place, silver medalist(s)	12	Stacey Chepkemboi Ndiwa (KEN)	31:46.36	PB
3rd place, bronze medalist(s)	11	Mercyline Chelangat (UGA)	31:48.41	
4	16	Beatrice Mutai (KEN)	31:49.81	PB
5	10	Natasha Wodak (CAN)	31:50.18	SB
6	19	Celia Sullohern (AUS)	31:50.75	PB
7	7	Juliet Chekwel (UGA)	31:57.97	
8	14	Madeline Hills (AUS)	32:01.04	
9	17	Rachel Cliff (CAN)	32:11.11	
10	9	Sandrafelis Chebet Tuei (KEN)	32:11.92	PB
11	1	Salome Nyirarukundo (RWA)	32:13.74	SB
12	18	Failuna Abdi Matanga (TAN)	32:22.09	
13	3	Loganathan Suriya (IND)	32:23.56	PB
14	4	Camille Buscomb (NZL)	32:23.91	
15	6	Emma Mitchell (NIR)	32:49.91	NR
16	8	Eloise Wellings (AUS)	32:51.47	
17	15	Jennifer-Louise Nesbitt (WAL)	32:58.14	PB
18	5	Beth Potter (SCO)	33:26.78	
19	13	Lineo Chaka (LES)	36:55.77	
