= Camille French =

New Zealand long-distance runner

Camille Buscomb
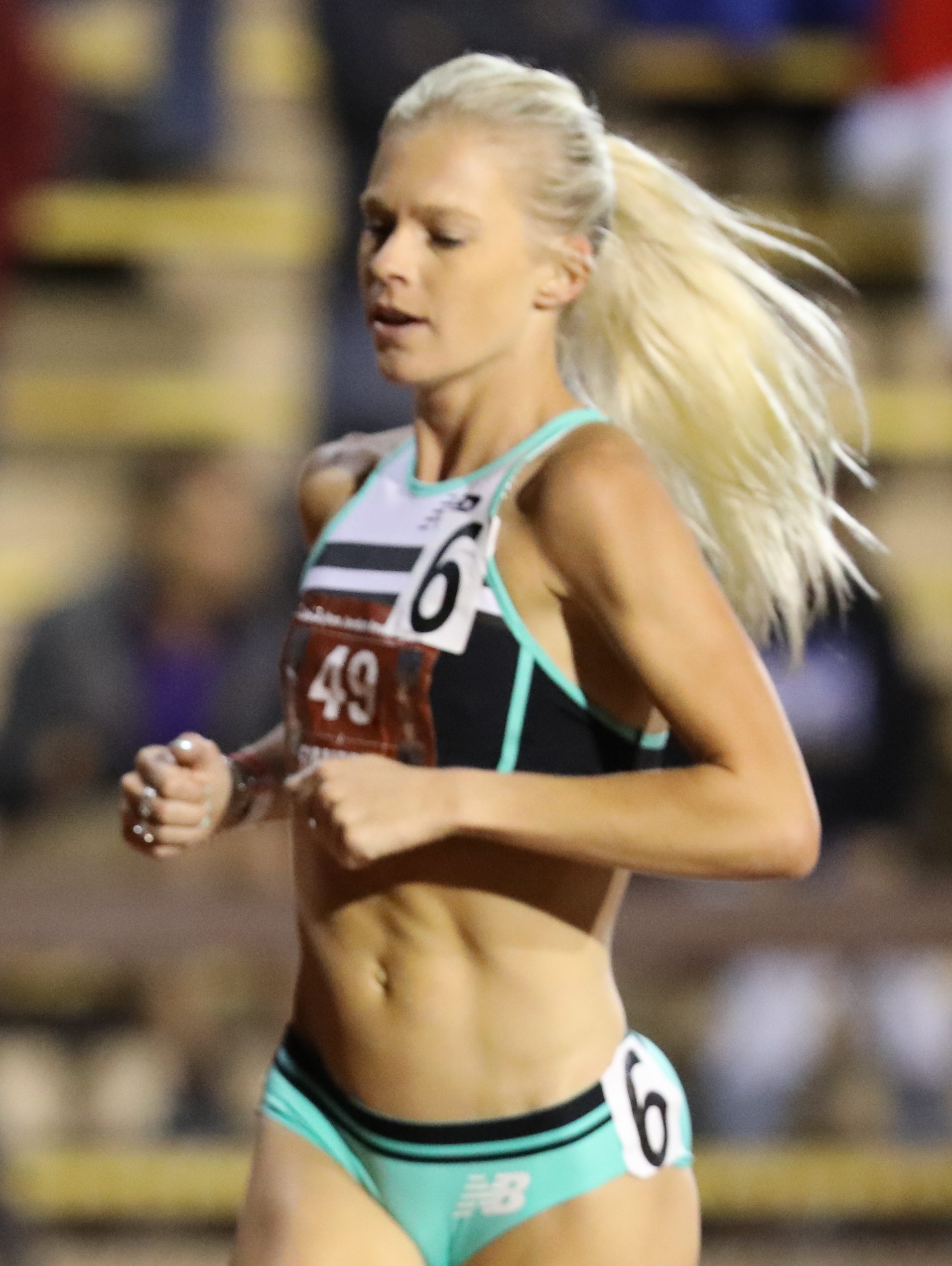
- Buscomb in 2019

Personal information
- Nationality: New Zealand
- Born: 11 July 1990 (age 36) Hamilton, New Zealand
- Education: University of Waikato
- Height: 1.64 m (5 ft 5 in)
- Weight: 51 kg (112 lb)

Sport
- Sport: Long-distance running
- Events: 10,000 m, 5,000 m, 1500 m
- Coached by: Nic Bideau

Camille French (née Buscomb; born 11 July 1990) is a New Zealand long-distance runner.

== Early life ==
Buscomb attended St Peter's School in Cambridge, New Zealand. She competed over 1500m in the World Youth Championships in 2007 and the 2008 Commonwealth Youth Games.

From 2009, she spent two and a half years on an athletics scholarship at Purdue University in Indiana, USA. She eventually transferred her studies from Purdue to the University of Waikato in New Zealand, where she was offered a Hillary Scholarship in 2015.

== Career ==
After returning to New Zealand, won her first national title in 2012, over 3000 metres, and also came second in New Zealand's 800m championship. The next year she won national the national road championships, over 10 km, and on the track won the 3000m, along with silver over 1500m.

Buscomb began concentrating on the 5000m distance in 2014, setting a series of personal bests but missing the qualification mark for that year's Commonwealth Games. She was New Zealand's 8 km cross-country champion that year, and also defended her 10 km road racing title from 2013. She retained her 10 km national road title and added the 5000m as well. She was third over 1500m at the national championships.

In 2015, she was the 5000m silver medalist at the World University Games. That September she claimed her third consecutive national 10 km road championship. She won a second consecutive 5000m national title, and improved her 1500m standing to second place. At the end of 2015 she won half marathons in Hamilton and Auckland, having had a cyst removed from her jaw less than two months beforehand. Her efforts to qualify for the 2016 Olympics were unsuccessful, and affected by her slow recovery from that surgery ("I came back too soon and it took me a long time to realise what a toll the surgery had taken on my body," she said).

She was New Zealand's 5000m champion again in 2016 (with a third place over 1500m), and also repeated her Hamilton half marathon victory of the year before.

At the 2017 World Championships in London, Buscomb finished in her heat in a time of 15:40.41 of the women's 5000 metres and did not qualify for the final, and in the women's 10,000 metres finished 30th in 33:07.53.

At the 2018 Commonwealth Games held on the Gold Coast, Australia, she finished 12th in the 5000m in 15:55.45, and 14th in 10,000m in 32:23.91.

In 2021, Buscomb competed in the 2020 Summer Olympics finishing 14th in her heat of 5000m, in a time of 15:24.39, which did not qualify her for the final and in the Olympic 10,000m she finished 19th in 32:10.49.
