= Thishala Algama =

Sri Lankan netball player

Thishala Algama is a Sri Lankan netball player who predominantly plays as a goal shooter for the Sri Lanka national netball team.

== Career ==
Following the retirement of veteran goal shooter, Tharjini Sivalingam, Thishala had been tipped as a frontrunner for the role of goal shooter in the national team with the aim of filling the void left by Tharjini, as the latter served a pivotal role at that position for a longer period of time during her illustrious playing career.

She was also named in the Sri Lankan squad for the 2015 Netball World Cup. She was also named in the Sri Lankan squad for the 2023 Netball World Cup, where Sri Lanka ended up at 12th position. She was an integral member of the Sri Lankan squad which emerged as runners-up to Singapore in the final of the 2024 Asian Netball Championships.
