= Pius Ogena =

Ugandan rugby player (born 1994)

- Born: Pius Ogena; 30 October 1994 (age 32) Mulago, Kampala, Uganda
- School: St. Jude Primary School, City High School, Hana Mixed School
- University: Uganda Christian University (incomplete)
- Occupation(s): Rugby player, Entrepreneur

Rugby union career
- Position(s): Flanker, Centre
- Current team: Kobs Rugby Club
Senior career
Years	Team	Apps	(Points)
2014–2018	Buffaloes RFC		
2018	Kabras Sugar RFC		
2019–present	Kobs RFC		
International career
Years	Team	Apps	(Points)
- Uganda Sevens
- Uganda (Rugby Cranes)

Pius Ogena is a Ugandan rugby player who has represented the Uganda national rugby sevens team, known as the Rugby Cranes, in both local and international competitions.

He is part of the Uganda national rugby union team and currently plays for the Kobs Rugby Club.

He has played for several notable teams, including Buffaloes, Heathens and Kabras Sugar of Kenya. Ogena has been part of Olympic qualification campaigns and remains active in both sport and off-field ventures.

== Early life and education ==
Pius Ogena was born on October 30, 1994, in Mulago, Kampala to Richard Oyulu and Florence Abidaru. He is the fifth of the six children on his father's side and the youngest child of his mother. He spent his early years in Naguru and began his education at St. Jude Primary School, where he was introduced to touch rugby in 2004 through a program initiated by the Uganda Rugby Union.

Though initially involved in football and boxing, Ogena gradually developed an interest in rugby. He later attended City High school, which gave him closer access to Kyadondo Rugby Club. In 2013, he received a scholarship to complete his A-Level at Hana Mixed School in Nsangi. He enrolled in a degree program in Procurement and Logistics Management at Uganda Christian University in Mukono, which he paused in 2017.

== Career ==
Ogena's rugby journey began at the development level with Saracens (later Stallions) at Kyadondo. In 2014, he joined the Buffaloes, playing as a flanker or center. In 2018, he signed with Kabras Sugar, a top rugby club in Kenyan league and the need to increase his physical capacity to match more experienced international players. Contract discussions with Kabras sugar did not materialize into an extension.

After returning to Uganda, Ogena made a notable and controversial transfer from Heathens, his long-time club based at Kyadondo to their tradition rivals, Kobs, who play at Legends Rugby Grounds. This move drew attention from fans, given the strong rivalry between the two clubs. However, Ogena stated that the decision was professional and based on the best offer available to him at the time.

Despite the controversy, his transition proved successful. In his debut season with Kobs, he contributed to the team winning both the Uganda Cup and the Sevens Championship.

Ogena has also been a consistent presence in the national rugby sevens team. He was among the players selected for the Olympic qualification campaign. In January, 2021, he participated in a high-altitude training camp in Kapchorwa, aimed at enhancing endurance for qualification matches in France. Competing teams included France, Ireland, Samoa, Tonga,Germany and others.

== Achievements ==
- USPA Rugby Player of the year (2019); selected by Uganda Sports Press Association for outstanding individual performance
- Domestic Titles with Kobs; Helped win the Uganda Cup and Sevens Championship during his first season with the club.
- International Appearances; Represented Uganda in tournaments held in countries including Australia, Germany, Chile, Uruguay, Hong Kong and South Africa.
- Olympic Qualification Participation; Played a role in Uganda's campaign to qualify for the Tokyo Olympics.
- Professional Rugby in Kenya; Competed in the Kenyan league with Kabras Sugar in 2018.
- Ogena was crowned men's MPV at 2023 URU awards after a season highlighted by 22 league tries and a return to the national 7s team.

== Other interests ==
Outside rugby, Ogena has expressed a strong interest in entrepreneurship, particularly in the food industry. He is skilled in preparing traditional Uganda dishes and has plans to open a bakery or food court. He credits this interest to skills he learned from his mother, who died in 2014.
