= Afa Rusivakula =

Fijian netball player

Personal information
- Full name: Unouna Afa Rusivakula
- Born: 22 June 1992 (age 34)

Netball career
- Playing position: goal shooter/goal attack
Years	Club team	Apps
2015	Celtic Dragons	
Years	National team	Caps

Unouna Afa Rusivakula (born 22 June 1992) is a Fijian netball player.

Rusivakula began playing in Fiji with the Shine On team in the Lautoka Netball Association. She made her international Test debut for Fiji in the 2011 Pacific Netball Series against Papua New Guinea, playing at goal shooter/goal attack. She represented Fiji in the 2011 World Netball Championships and the 2015 Netball World Cup, and had reached 38 international caps by 2015. She played for the Capital Force in Fiji's Digicel Punjas Netball Super League in 2015 and 2016, winning the premiership in 2016; she also played for the Wardens Netball Club in the Suva Netball Association. Outside of sport, Rusivakula trained as a correctional officer.

In December 2015, Rusivakula was signed by the Celtic Dragons in the United Kingdom's Netball Superleague as one of their international import players for their 2016 season. She scored 48 points in her first game for the Dragons in February 2016. For 2017, Rusivakula was signed by the new Northern Stars franchise in New Zealand's professional ANZ Championship competition as their import player. She played in thirteen games in the 2017 season, scoring 122 goals with a percentage of 73.05%. However, she was not re-signed for the 2018 season, with the club instead signing English captain Ama Agbeze as their import player. Rusivakula played for Marama Vou, Netball Fiji's representative team, in the 2017 Netball New Zealand Super Club.
