= Shonica Wharton =

Barbadian netball player

Personal information
- Born: 12 June 1996 (age 28); Bridgetown
- Height: 1.85 m (6 ft 1 in)
- Occupation: netball player

Netball career
- Playing position(s): goal shooter, goal keeper

Shonica Wharton (born 12 June 1996) is a Barbadian netball player who represents Barbados internationally and plays in the positions of goal shooter and goal keeper. She competed at the Netball World Cup on two occasions in 2015 and 2019. She also represented Barbados at the Commonwealth Games in 2014 and 2018.
