= Juliet Chekwel =

Ugandan long-distance runner

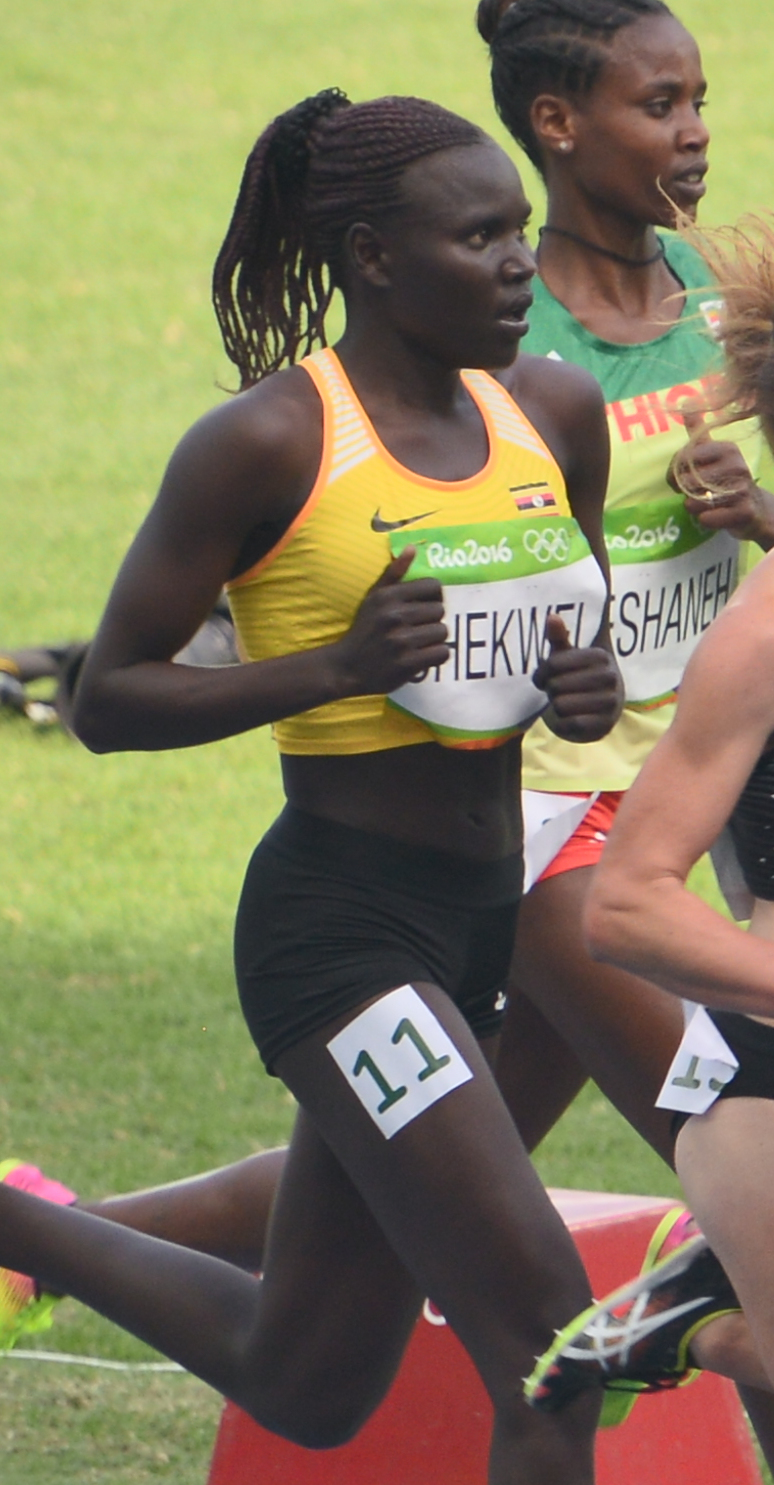
- Chekwel at the 2016 Olympics

Personal information
- Born: 25 May 1990 (age 36) Kapchorwa, Uganda
- Education: Makerere University

Sport
- Sport: Athletics
- Events: 5000 m, 10,000 m, steeplechase
- Coached by: Giuseppe Giambrone

Achievements and titles
- Personal bests: 5000 m – 15:20.15 (2016); 10,000 m – 31:37.99 (2016); 3000 mS – 9:48.01 (2015); Marathon – 2:23:13 (2020) NR

Juliet Chekwel (born 25 May 1990) is a Ugandan long-distance runner. She competed in the 10,000 metres at the 2015 World Championships in Beijing placing 17th in a new national record of 32:20.95. She competed in the 5000 m and 10,000 m events at the 2016 Summer Olympics.

In 2019, she competed in the senior women's race at the 2019 IAAF World Cross Country Championships held in Aarhus, Denmark. She finished in 13th place. In 2020, she competed in the women's half marathon at the 2020 World Athletics Half Marathon Championships held in Gdynia, Poland.

In June 2021, she qualified to represent Uganda in the marathon at the 2020 Summer Olympics. She finished 69th in 2:53.40.

== International competitions ==
Year	Competition	Venue	Position	Event	Notes
Representing Uganda
2010	African Championships	Nairobi, Kenya	13th (h)	1500 m	4:25.50
2013	World Championships	Moscow, Russia	16th	10,000 m	32:57.02
2015	World Championships	Beijing, China	17th	10,000 m	32:20.95
2016	Olympic Games	Rio de Janeiro, Brazil	17th (h)	5000 m	15:29.07
2016	Olympic Games	Rio de Janeiro, Brazil	–	10,000m	DNF
2018	Commonwealth Games	Gold Coast, Australia	4th	5000 m	15:30.17
2018	Commonwealth Games	Gold Coast, Australia	7th	10,000 m	31:57.97
2019	World Championships	Doha, Qatar	20th	10,000 m	33:28.18
2021	Olympic Games	Sapporo, Japan	69th	Marathon	2:53:40
2025	World Championships	Tokyo, Japan	–	Marathon	DNF
