= Mercyline Chelangat =

Ugandan long-distance runner

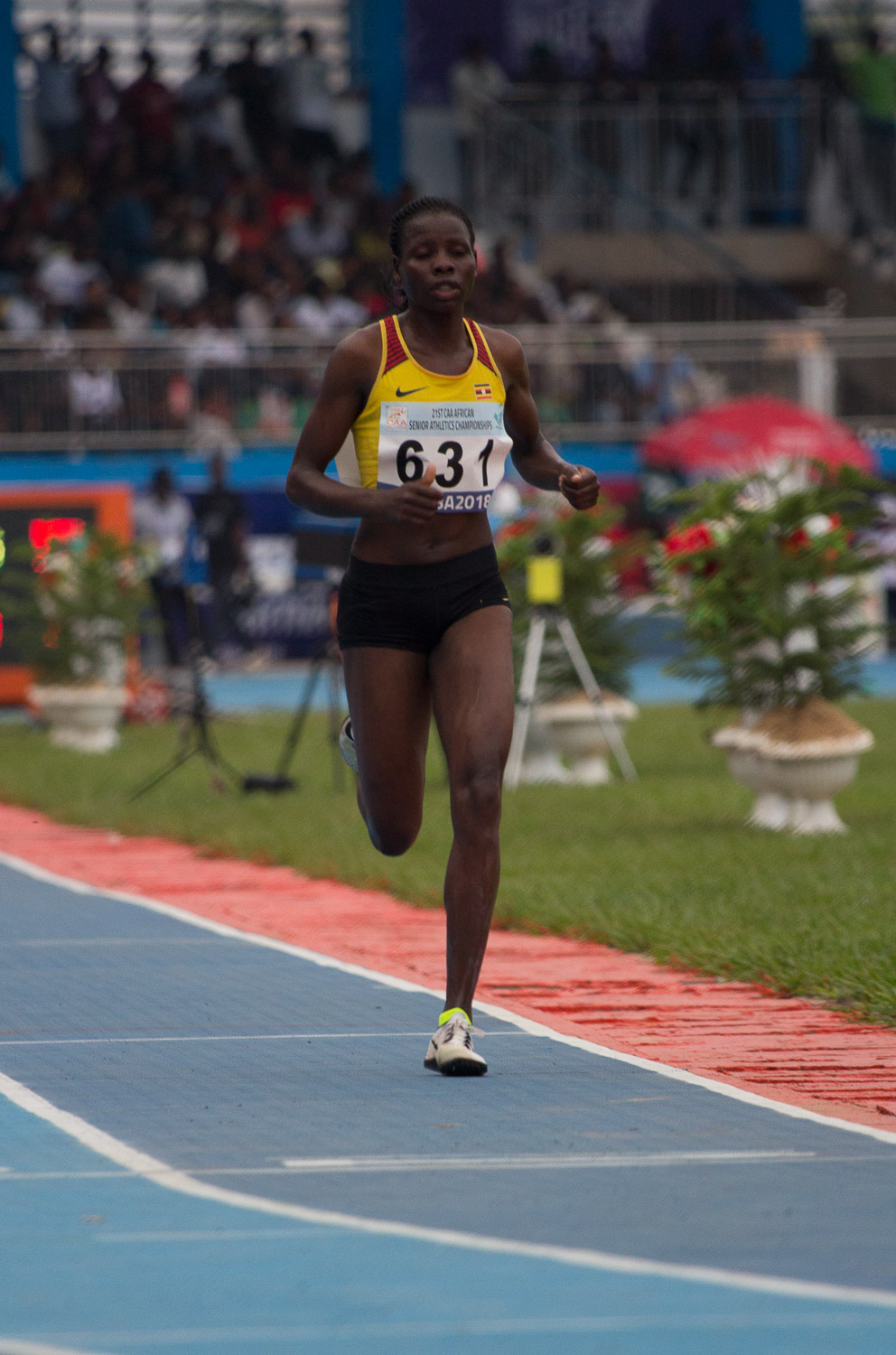
- Mercyline Chelangat at the 2018 African Athletics Championships

Personal information
- Nationality: Ugandan
- Born: 17 December 1997 (age 28)

Sport
- Country: Uganda
- Sport: Long-distance running
- Event: 10,000 metres

Achievements and titles
- Personal best: 10,000 meters: 31:15.05 (2021)
Medal record
Women's athletics
Representing Uganda
Commonwealth Games
Bronze medal – third place	2018 Gold Coast	10,000m

Mercyline Chelangat (born 17 December 1997) is a Ugandan long-distance runner. She competed in the women's 10,000 metres at the 2017 World Championships in Athletics. In 2018, she competed in the senior women's race at the 2018 African Cross Country Championships held in Chlef, Algeria.

In June 2021, she qualified to represent Uganda at the 2020 Summer Olympics.

In January 2026, Chelangat was issued with a five-year ban for anti-doping doping rule violations after testing positive for testosterone and clomiphene in 2025. Her 49th place in the marathon at the Tokyo 2025 Word Athletics championship was disqualified.
