= Racheal Nanyonga =

Ugandan netball player (born 1990)

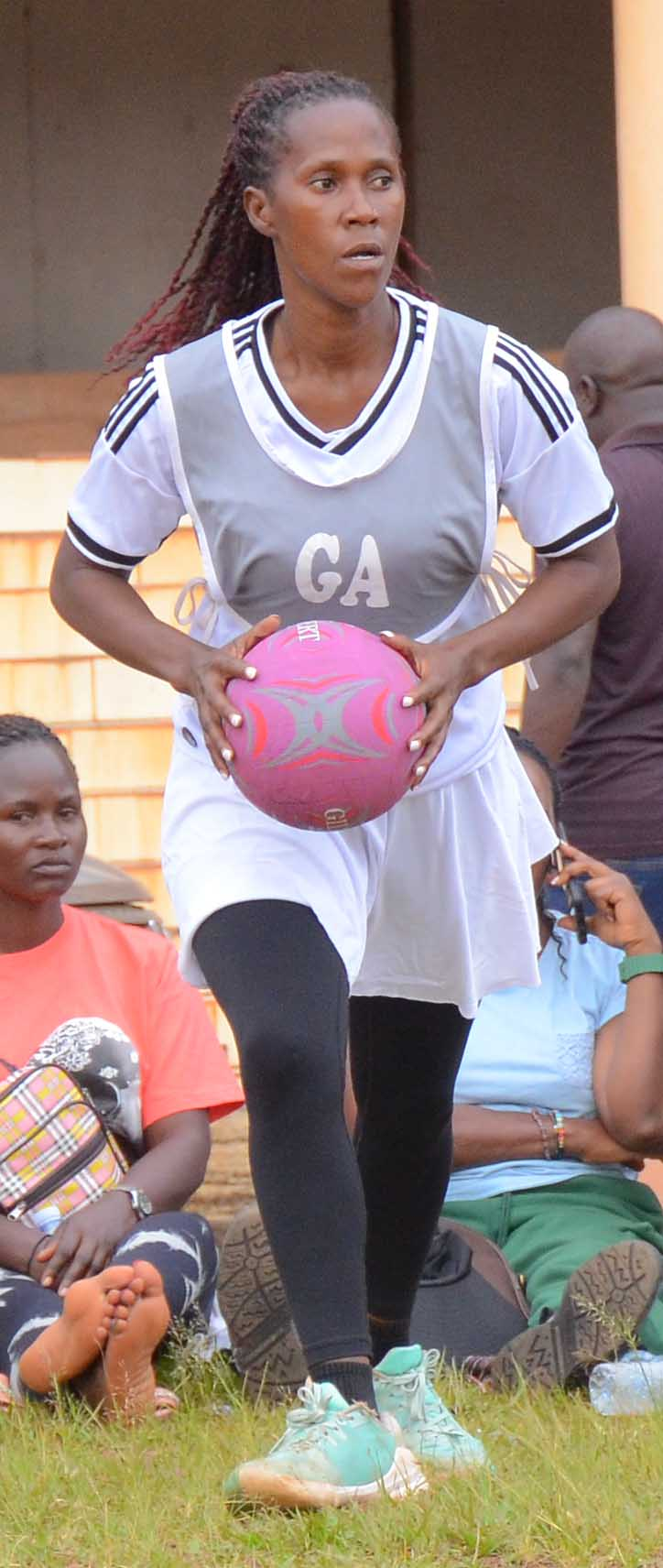

Personal information
- Born: October 25, 1990 (age 36) Mulago, Uganda
- Height: 1.67 m (5 ft 5 1/2 in)

Netball career
- Playing position: GK

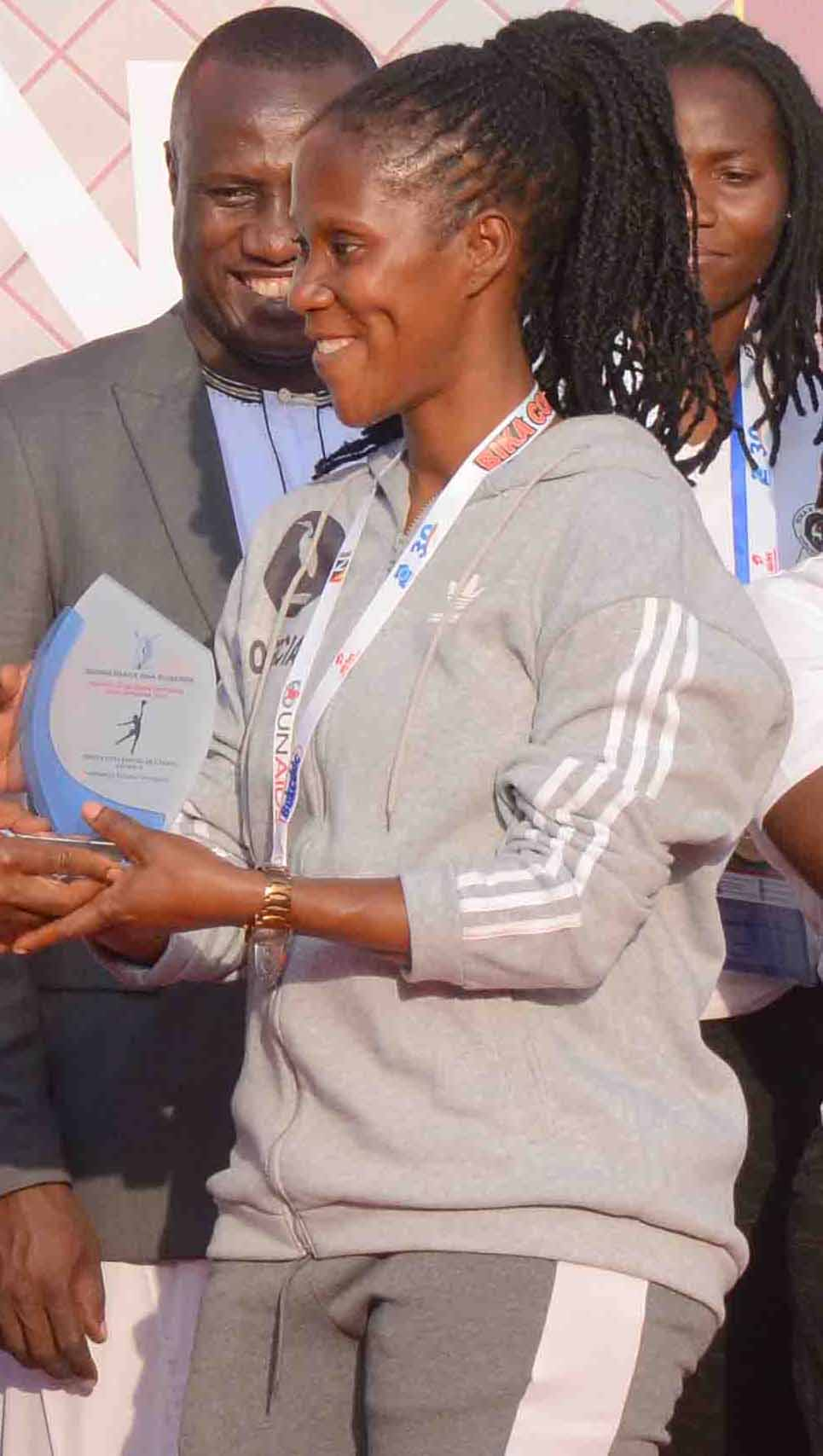
Racheal Nanyonga

Racheal Nanyonga (born 25 October 1990) is an Ugandan netball player who represents Uganda internationally and plays in the position of goal attack. She has represented Uganda at the 2018 Commonwealth Games and at the 2019 Netball World Cup. Racheal Nanyonga who was , in Mulago, Uganda. Her entry into netball was inspired by her elder sister, Irene Namanda.

== Career Highlights & Role ==
- Position: Nanyonga primarily plays as a Goal Attack (GA) and is recognized for her shooting accuracy and agility on the court.
- Leadership: In November 2025, Nanyonga was appointed Captain of the She Cranes. She previously served as assistant captain during the 2015 and 2019 Netball World Cups.
- Physicality: Standing at 152 cm (approx. 5 ft), she was the shortest Goal Attack at the 2015 Netball World Cup, where she gained international acclaim for her high shooting percentages.

=== Major Tournaments ===
- Netball World Cup: Represented Uganda in the 2015 (Sydney) and 2019 (Liverpool) editions.
- Commonwealth Games: Competed at the 2018 Gold Coast Games.
- Africa Netball Championship: Led the team as captain during the December 2025 tournament, where Uganda finished as runners-up to South Africa.
- Celtic Cup (2025): Named captain for the inaugural Celtic Cup in Scotland. Despite being the captain, she initially faced visa delays that hindered her travel with the team in late November 2025.
