= Netball Uganda National Women Super League =

Top level netball league in Uganda

The Netball Uganda National Women Super League is the top level netball league in Uganda.

Uganda has three recognized Netball leagues; the Super League and division two for women and men's division one. The competition was suspended in 2020 due the COVID-19 pandemic, and returned in 2021.

For the 2022/23 season, the women's division 1 competition is played across four venues, with games grouped into two rounds. For the season, for the first time, some games were played under floodlights, to allow more fixtures to take place after potential spectators had finished work. Some games were shown on television.

The 12 teams in women's division 1 in 2022/23 were:

- Africa Renewal University
- Busia Greater Lions
- KCCA Netball Club
- Mutelx Life Sport Netball Club
- NIC Netball Club
- Police Netball Club
- Posta Netball Club
- Prisons Netball Club
- UCU Netball Club
- UGX-Luweero
- UPDF Netball Club
- Makindye Weyonje Netball Club
