= Lynsey Gallagher =

Scottish netball player (born 1992)

Personal information
- Nationality: Scottish
- Born: 20 May 1992 (age 32)

Sport
- Sport: Netball
- Club: Strathclyde Sirens
- Team: Scotland netball team

Lynsey Gallagher (born 20 May 1992) is a Scottish netball player, who currently plays for the Strathclyde Sirens in the Netball Superleague. She was selected to represent the Scotland netball team on various occasions, including the 2019 Netball World Cup.
