= Norfolk Island national netball team =

Norfolk Island
- Association: Norfolk Island Netball Association
- Confederation: Oceania Netball Federation
- Head coach: Jenny Gow
- Asst coach: Myka Quintal
- Manager: Rachel Gentles
- Captain: Emily Ryves
Team colours

First international
- 1993 vs Samoa - Lost 24 - 59

Largest win
- 2001 vs American Samoa - 81 - 15

Largest defeat
- 2001 vs Fiji - 9 - 93

Netball World Cup
- Appearances: not eligible

Commonwealth Games
- Appearances: none

The Norfolk Island national netball team represent Norfolk Island in international netball.

The team's first tournament was at the 1993 South Pacific Mini Games held in Port Vila, Vanuatu. Their next known tournament was at 1999 South Pacific Games where they were narrowly beaten by Vanuatu in the Bronze Medal playoff. The only other recorded competition's were the 2001 South Pacific Mini Games held in Kingston, Norfolk Island where they finished sixth, and at the 2007 Pacific Games and 2019 Pacific Games where they finished seventh.

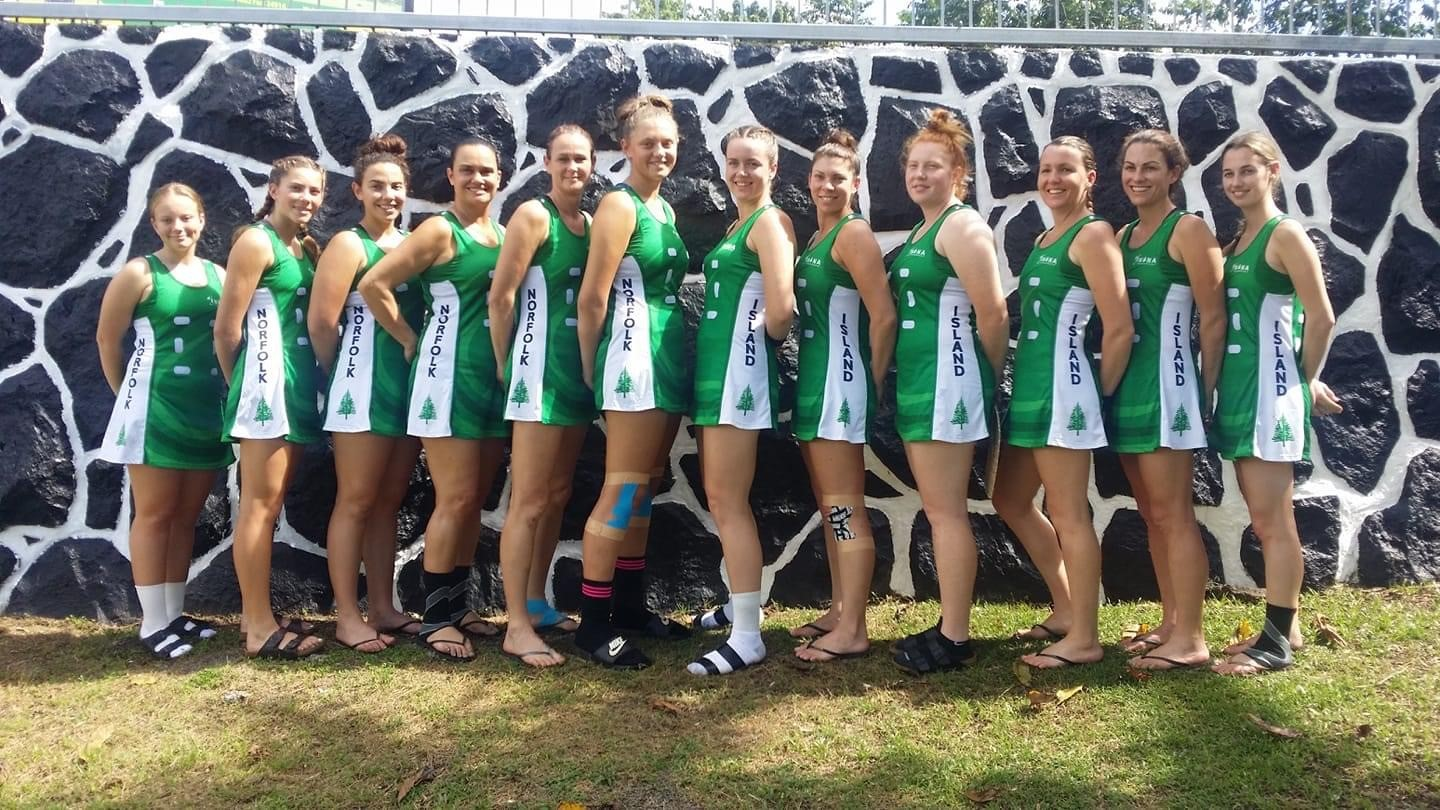
2019 Norfolk Island National Netball team

The squad for the 1993 South Pacific Mini Games
Cara Buffett, Vanessa Cooper-Magri, Renee Edward, Julie Evans, Suzanne Evans, Sarlu LeCren, Krista Morris, Bekki Nobbs, Debbie Quintal, Juliette Yager-Grant, Liz Randell, Linietta Wakaciri.

The squad for the 1999 South Pacific Games
Julie Evans, Suzanne Evans, Leanne Buffett, Cindy Douran, Mandy Gardner, Jenny Gow, Jodie McCoy, Tania Randell, Tracey Tager.

The squad for the 2001 South Pacific Mini Games
Suzanne Evans, Cindy Douran, Jenny Gow, Tania Randell, Jamie Christensen, Olivia Cooper, Michelle Dowling, Karen Hnederson, Bekki Meers, Corinne Parsons, Michella Quintal, Serine Mace-Trickey.

The squad for the 2007 South Pacific Games
Olivia Cooper, Michelle Dowling, Serine Mace-Trickey, Susie Bigg, Nic Gow, Sarah Henderson, Tash Partridge, Emily Ryves, Tenielle Schmitz, Toni Wilson, Suzanne Evans, Karen Henderson (Coach), Shelly LeCren (Manager).

The squad for the 2019 Pacific Games:
Michell Dowling, Emily Ryves, Suzanne Evans, Candice Nobbs, Alana Christian, Lara Bigg, Erin Christian, Rianna Christian, Jaimie Christensen, Mareeva Evans, Tahlia Evans, Bekki Meers, Myka Quintal, Kelly Schmitz, Kylie Sterling and Paige Adams.

The squad for the 2023 Pacific Games:
Amelia Murray, Bekki Meers, Jordan Murray, Meresiana Sadrata, Amy Steven, Kylie Sterling, Tahlia Evans, Tyler Bigg (VC), Candice Nobbs, Emily Ryves (C), Lara Bigg, Rianna Christian, Jenny Gow (Head Coach), Myka Quintal (Assistant Coach).

== Competitive history ==
(South) Pacific Games
Year	Games	Event	Location	Placing
1999	XI Games	Netball	Santa Rita, Guam	4th
2007	XIII Games	Netball	Apia, Samoa	7th
2019	XVI Games	Netball	Apia, Samoa	7th
2023	XVII Games	Netball	Honiara, Solomon Islands	6th

(South) Pacific Mini Games
Year	Games	Event	Location	Placing
1993	IV Games	Netball	Port Vila, Vanuatu	8th
2001	VI Games	Netball	Kingston, Norfolk Island	6th

== Test match results ==
Date	Vs.	Score	Venue	Competition
8 December 1993	Western Samoa	24 - 59	Port Vila, Vanuatu	1993 South Pacific Mini Games results
9 December 1993	Fiji	17 - 63	Port Vila, Vanuatu	1993 South Pacific Mini Games results
10 December 1993	Solomon Islands	34 - 49	Port Vila, Vanuatu	1993 South Pacific Mini Games results
11 December 1993	Vanuatu	30 - 49	Port Vila, Vanuatu	1993 South Pacific Mini Games results
13 December 1993	American Samoa	48 - 29	Port Vila, Vanuatu	1993 South Pacific Mini Games results
14 December 1993	Vanuatu	34 - 44	Port Vila, Vanuatu	1993 South Pacific Mini Games results
June 1999	Papua New Guinea	22 - 96	Santa Rita, Guam	1999 South Pacific Games results
June 1999	Fiji	12 - 96	Santa Rita, Guam	1999 South Pacific Games results
June 1999	Vanuatu	41 - 42	Santa Rita, Guam	1999 South Pacific Games results
June 1999	Papua New Guinea	23 - 52	Santa Rita, Guam	1999 South Pacific Games results
June 1999	Fiji	18 - 71	Santa Rita, Guam	1999 South Pacific Games results
June 1999	Vanuatu	33 - 36	Santa Rita, Guam	1999 South Pacific Games results
June 1999	Vanuatu	41 - 36	Santa Rita, Guam	1999 South Pacific Games results
December 2001	American Samoa	81 - 15	Kingston, Norfolk Island	2001 South Pacific Mini Games results
December 2001	Papua New Guinea	25 - 89	Kingston, Norfolk Island	2001 South Pacific Mini Games results
December 2001	Fiji	17 - 82	Kingston, Norfolk Island	2001 South Pacific Mini Games results
December 2001	Solomon Islands	12 - 47	Kingston, Norfolk Island	2001 South Pacific Mini Games results
27 August 2007	Fiji	9 - 93	Apia, Samoa	2007 Pacific Games results
28 August 2007	Cook Islands	15 - 83	Apia, Samoa	2007 Pacific Games results
29 August 2007	Solomon Islands	35 - 63	Apia, Samoa	2007 Pacific Games results
31 August 2007	Tokelau	32 - 64	Apia, Samoa	2007 Pacific Games results
1 September 2007	Vanuatu	39 - 38	Apia, Samoa	2007 Pacific Games results
15 July 2019	Samoa	12 - 95	Apia, Samoa	2019 Pacific Games
16 July 2019	Cook Islands	16 - 91	Apia, Samoa	2019 Pacific Games Report
17 July 2019	Tokelau	17 - 64	Apia, Samoa	2019 Pacific Games Report
18 July 2019	Solomon Islands	36 - 42	Apia, Samoa	2019 Pacific Games
19 July 2019	American Samoa	67 - 16	Apia, Samoa	2019 Pacific Games
27 November 2023	Samoa	14 - 73	Honiara, Solomon Islands	2023 Pacific Games results
28 November 2023	Solomon Islands	40 - 34	Honiara, Solomon Islands	2023 Pacific Games results
29 November 2023	Fiji	16 - 98	Honiara, Solomon Islands	2023 Pacific Games results
1 December 2023	Cook Islands	26 - 59	Honiara, Solomon Islands	2023 Pacific Games results

== See also ==
- Sport in Norfolk Island
- Netball in Australia
