= Vilimaina Davu =

Fiji and New Zealand netball international

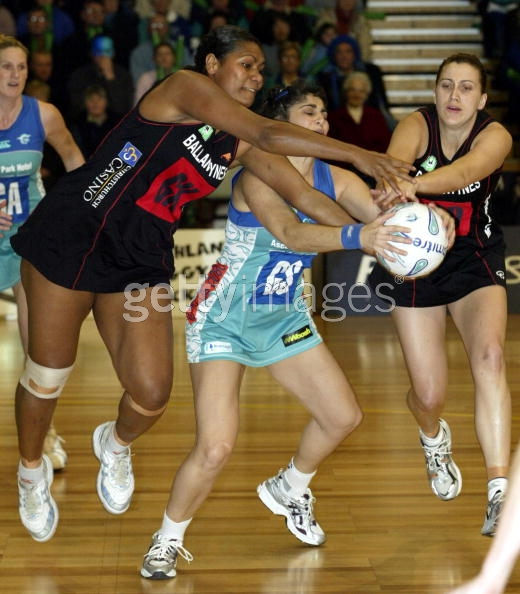
- 18 June 2004: Vilimaina Davu (left) playing for Canterbury Flames against Southern Sting in the 2004 National Bank Cup final at Stadium Southland. Herself and Flames team mate Peta Stephens challenge Sting's Natalie Avellino.

Personal information
- Born: 15 January 1977 (age 49) Nadi, Fiji
- Height: 1.90 m (6 ft 3 in)

Netball career
- Playing position: GK
Years	Club team	Apps
1994–1997	Nadroga	
2000–2006	Canterbury NPC	
2000–2006	Canterbury Flames	
2007	Northern Force	
2008–2009	Northern Mystics	
Years	National team	Caps
1993–1999	Fiji	55
2000	Team Pasifika	2
2000	World 7	
2000–2006	New Zealand	60
2007	Fiji	
Coaching career
- Years: Team
- 2006–2007: Fiji
Medal record
Representing Fiji
Pacific Games
Gold medal – first place	1995 Tahiti	Team
Gold medal – first place	1999 Guam	Team
Silver medal – second place	1997 American Samoa	Team
Bronze medal – third place	1993 Vanuatu	Team
Representing New Zealand
World Netball Championships
Gold medal – first place	2003 Kingston	Team
Commonwealth Games
Silver medal – second place	2002 Manchester	Team
Gold medal – first place	2006 Melbourne	Team

Vilimaina Davu (born 15 January 1977) is a former netball international who represented both Fiji and New Zealand. She was a prominent member of the New Zealand teams that were silver medallists at the 2002 Commonwealth Games and gold medallists at the 2003 World Netball Championships and the 2006 Commonwealth Games. However, she began and ended her international career with Fiji, representing them at the 1999 and 2007 World Netball Championships. During the Coca-Cola Cup/National Bank Cup era, she played for Canterbury Flames and Northern Force. During the early ANZ Championship era, she played for Northern Mystics. In 2022, she was included on a list of the 25 best players to feature in netball leagues in New Zealand since 1998.

== Early life, family and education ==
Davu was born in Nadi, Fiji. Her family home was in Nuku, a village in Serua Province. She began playing netball aged 8 and attended Lomary Secondary School. In November 2007, Davu's father collapsed at Nadi International Airport. He was part of a small group of relatives and friends that were meeting the Fiji team on their return from the 2007 World Netball Championships. He died shortly after. She is married to Aporosa Tamaniveli. They met in 2004 when she returned to Fiji on a holiday. Together they have one daughter.

== Playing career ==
=== Club career ===
==== Canterbury Flames ====
Between 2000 and 2006, Davu played for Canterbury Flames in the Coca-Cola Cup/National Bank Cup league. She was a prominent member of the Flames teams that played in four grand finals. She captained Flames during the 2005 season. During this time she also represented Canterbury in the National Provincial Championships.

==== Northern Force ====
In 2007, Davu played for Northern Force in the National Bank Cup league. In November 2006, Davu was announced as the new head coach of Fiji. It was speculated that she would be released from her contract with Force. In March 2007, Davu was injured in a car accident in Suva. She escaped serious injury but was unable to join the Force team for pre-season. She subsequently helped Force reach the 2007 grand final, which they lost to Southern Sting.

==== Northern Mystics ====
In 2008 and 2009, Davu played for Northern Mystics in the ANZ Championship. Netball New Zealand initially overruled Mystics application to register Davu, partly because she had switched allegiances from New Zealand to Fiji. The ANZ Championship only allowed one foreign player per team and Mystics had already registered Cathrine Latu (Samoa). Netball New Zealand also based their assessment on Davu's below par performance at the 2007 World Netball Championships. However, Mystics successfully appealed the decision and Davu was eventually cleared to play. To help regain her fitness, Davu became an ambassador for the weight-loss company, Jenny Craig. Ahead of the 2009 season, Davu was became a New Zealand citizen. In April 2022, she was included on a list of the 25 best players to feature in netball leagues in New Zealand since 1998.

=== International career ===
==== Fiji (1993–1999) ====
Between 1993 and 1999, Davu made 55 senior appearances for Fiji. In 1992, aged just 14, she was selected to play for Fiji at the 1992 World Youth Netball Championships. She was subsequently a member of the Fiji teams that were bronze medallists at the 1993 South Pacific Mini Games and gold medallists at the 1995 South Pacific Games. She captained the Fiji teams that were silver medallists at the 1997 South Pacific Mini Games and gold medallists at the 1999 South Pacific Games. She also captained the Fiji team that finished sixth at the 1999 World Netball Championships.

==== Team Pasifika/World 7 ====
In June 2000, Vilimaina captained the Team Pasifika selection that played New Zealand in a two match series. The team was coached by Te Aroha Keenan and also featured Teresa Tairi, Jenny-May Coffin, Frances Solia and Sheryl Clarke.

In July 2000, Davu played for the World 7 team that played New Zealand in a three match series. The team was coached by Jill McIntosh and also featured Kathryn Harby (Australia), Elaine Davis (Jamaica), Leana du Plooy (South Africa).

==== New Zealand ====
Between 2000 and 2006, Davu made 60 senior appearances for New Zealand. On 25 November 2000, she made her senior debut against South Africa. She was a member of the New Zealand team that were silver medalists at the 2002 Commonwealth Games. She was a prominent member of the New Zealand teams that won the 2003 World Netball Championships and the 2006 Commonwealth Games. Davu was highly regarded as an international goalkeeper. Australia head coach Norma Plummer was a big admirer. Ruth Aitken said Davu rated among the great New Zealand defenders such as Waimarama Taumaunu and Bernice Mene. In October 2005, she announced she was retiring from international netball.

==== Fiji (2007) ====
In 2006 and 2007, Davu served as head coach of Fiji. She was head coach when Fiji won the gold medal at the 2007 South Pacific Games She was player/coach for Fiji at the 2007 Netball World Championships. Davu faced criticism for her performances at the tournament. She admitted her fitness and conditioning wasn't what it should have been, but emphasized she was only a late inclusion in the squad after visa issues ruled out some of the other members.

Tournaments	Place	Team
1992 World Youth Netball Championships	5th	Fiji
1993 South Pacific Mini Games	3rd place, bronze medalist(s)	Fiji
1995 South Pacific Games	1st place, gold medalist(s)	Fiji
1997 South Pacific Mini Games	2nd place, silver medalist(s)	Fiji
1999 South Pacific Games	1st place, gold medalist(s)	Fiji
1999 World Netball Championships	6th	Fiji
2002 Commonwealth Games	2nd place, silver medalist(s)	New Zealand
2003 World Netball Championships	1st place, gold medalist(s)	New Zealand
2006 Commonwealth Games	1st place, gold medalist(s)	New Zealand
2007 World Netball Championships	9th	Fiji

== Employment ==
Davu has worked as a recruitment consultant for Coverstaff in Auckland.

== Honours ==
=== Playing career ===
New Zealand

- World Netball Championships
  - Winners: 2003
- Commonwealth Games
  - Winners: 2006
  - Runners Up: 2002

Fiji

- Pacific Games
  - Winners: 1995, 1999
  - Runners Up: 1997

Canterbury Flames

- Coca-Cola Cup/National Bank Cup
  - Runners Up: 2000, 2001, 2002, 2004

Northern Force

- National Bank Cup
  - Runners Up: 2007

=== Coaching career ===
Fiji

- Pacific Games
  - Winners: 2007

Individual Awards

Year	Award
2000	Fijian Sportswoman of the Year
2002	Sport Canterbury Sports Personality of the Year
2014	Fiji Sports Hall of Fame
