= Netball at the Pacific Games =

International netball competition

- Founded: 1963
- Administrator: World Netball; Oceania Netball Federation
- Most recent champion: Tonga (1st Title)
- Most titles: Fiji (7 titles)

Netball at the Pacific Games (previously known as the South Pacific Games) has been an optional Pacific Games sport since 1963. Fiji have been the tournament's most successful team, winning seven gold medals. Cook Islands have won four gold medals. To date, only the Cook Islands and Fiji have won netball gold at the Pacific Games.

Netball was originally scheduled as a medal sport for the 1969 South Pacific Games in Port Moresby, however, due to the sport having only two entries, a prize instead was awarded to the winner. Netball was not included in 1971, 1975, 1987 and 2011.

== Results summary ==
Games	Gold	Silver	Bronze
1963 (Note: Summary of the netball competitions in the SPG and SPMG from 1963 to 1989, as reported in Islands Business: 1963: Fiji; 1966: Cook Islands; 1969: no netball; 1971: no netball; 1975: no netball; 1979: Fiji; 1981: Cook Islands (mini games); 1983: Cook Islands; 1985: Cook Islands (mini games); 1987: no netball; 1989: Cook Islands (mini games).)	Fiji	Western Samoa	Papua New Guinea
1966	Cook Islands	Fiji	Papua New Guinea
1969 (Note: The September 1969 issue of Pacific Islands Monthly (PIM) stated that "women's netball attracted only a few onlookers at the Boroko Reserve"; and that, "The Fijian team withdrew at the last minute and two outsiders—Manly from Sydney and a 'Combined' team—fielded teams to give the Solomon Islanders and New Guineans a variety of six matches each. No medals were awarded". While the Pacific Games Council results as of October 2015 list PNG and Solomons as gold and silver winners, secondary sources published at the time, such as the South Pacific Bulletin, recorded that PNG was awarded a prize instead because only two teams had entered; similarly, the 1969 results for netball published by PIM in September 1971.)	PNG given a prize instead of the gold medal as only two teams had entered.		
1979 (Note: The November 1979 issue of Pacific Islands Monthly (PIM) quoted a visiting umpire as saying "Fiji and Cooks were clearly the best teams followed some way behind by PNG – but there were 'no others'", and stated that "Papua New Guinea took the bronze" in the netball competition. A few pages later in the PIM results section, Tonga is listed as finishing in third place for netball. However, there are sources which suggest that the PIM published results might have some inaccuracies and could be incomplete: 1. The same PIM issue, reports that Fiji won table tennis gold medals for both the women's team event and the women's doubles. However, only the women's doubles event is recorded in the list of results, and no women's (or men's) team event is included.; 2. The men's 4 × 200 metres freestyle relay was not listed in the PIM results, However, a publication from Guam's Political Status Education Coordinating Commission states that the Guam swimmer Hollis Kimbrough, "won a record seven medals in the '79 SPG alone". As the PIM results show only four medals for Kimbrough plus two men's relay medals won by the Guam team, it may be the case that the men's 4 × 200 m event was missed in the results.)	Fiji	Cook Islands	Papua New Guinea
1983	Cook Islands	Fiji	Tonga
1991	Cook Islands	Papua New Guinea	Tonga
1995	Fiji	Papua New Guinea	Tonga
1999 (Note: Vanuatu won a bronze medal for netball at the 1999 South Pacific Games.)	Fiji	Papua New Guinea	Vanuatu
2003	Fiji	Papua New Guinea	Cook Islands
2007	Fiji	Samoa	Papua New Guinea
2015	Fiji	Papua New Guinea	Samoa
2019	Cook Islands	Tonga	Papua New Guinea
2023	Tonga	Fiji	Samoa

== All-time medal table ==
Rank	Team	1st place, gold medalist(s)	2nd place, silver medalist(s)	3rd place, bronze medalist(s)	Total
1	Fiji	7	3	0	10
2	Cook Islands	4	1	1	6
3	Tonga	1	1	3	5
4	Papua New Guinea	0	5	5	10
5	Samoa	0	2	2	5
6	Vanuatu	0	0	1	1

== Pacific Mini Games ==
Edn	Year	Host city	Final placings				Refs
Edn	Year	Host city	Gold	Score	Silver	Bronze	Refs
I	1981	Honiara	Cook Islands		Papua New Guinea	Solomon Islands	
II	1985	Rarotonga	Cook Islands		Papua New Guinea	Tonga	
III	1989	Nuku'alofa	Cook Islands		Papua New Guinea	?	. (Note: 1989: Cook Islands won the netball competition, defeating PNG by 53–49 in the final. Fiji did not play in the tournament.)
IV	1993	Port Vila	Cook Islands		Papua New Guinea	Fiji	
V	1997	Pago Pago	Cook Islands		Fiji	Papua New Guinea	
VI	2001	Kingston	Fiji		Papua New Guinea	Cook Islands	
VII	Netball not contested						
VIII	2009	Rarotonga	Fiji		Papua New Guinea	Cook Islands	
IX	Netball not contested						
X	2017	Port Vila	Papua New Guinea		Tonga	Solomon Islands	
XI	Netball not contested						

== See also ==
- Netball at the Commonwealth Games
- Oceania Netball Federation

== Sources ==
- "Last of the Super Games/The Medal Winners" (PDF). Pacific Islands Monthly. 50 (10). 1979. Archived from the original on 4 July 2016.
