= 2014 Pacific Netball Series =

Pacific Netball event that occurred in 2014

Netball at the 2014 Pacific Netball Series
- Location: Samoa
- Dates: 3–8 June 2014

Medalists
gold medal	Fiji
silver medal	Samoa
bronze medal	Papua New Guinea

The 2014 Pacific Netball series was held in Samoa between 3–8 June 2014.

== Results ==
=== Table ===
Team	P	W	D	L	PTS
Fiji	6	6	0	0	12
Samoa	6	4	0	2	8
Papua New Guinea	6	2	0	4	4
Cook Islands	6	0	0	6	0

3 June 2014; 12:30	Report	Fiji	58 – 36	Cook Islands

14:45	Report	Papua New Guinea	48 – 57	Samoa

4 June 2014; 14:15	Report	Samoa	46 – 50	Fiji

14:45	Report	Papua New Guinea	50 – 40	Cook Islands

5 June 2014; 14:45	Report	Samoa	51 – 43	Cook Islands

14:45	Report	Papua New Guinea	49 – 59	Fiji

6 June 2014; 12:30	Report	Samoa	49 – 39	Papua New Guinea

14:45	Report	Cook Islands	40 – 53	Fiji

7 June 2014; 14:15	Report	Cook Islands	44 – 49	Papua New Guinea

14:45	Report	Samoa	43 – 45	Fiji

8 June 2014; 14:45	Report	Papua New Guinea	42 – 58	Fiji

14:45	Report	Cook Islands	36 – 50	Samoa

== Final standings ==
Place	Nation
Gold	Fiji
Silver	Samoa
Bronze	Papua New Guinea
4	Cook Islands

== See also ==
- Pacific Netball Series
