= Niue national netball team =

Niue
- Confederation: Oceania Netball Federation
Team colours

Netball World Cup
- Appearances: 2 (Debuted in 1999)
- Best result: 12th (2003)

Commonwealth Games
- Appearances: none

The Niue national netball team represent Niue in international netball.

== Competitive history ==
World Netball Championships
Year	Championship	Location	Placing
1999	10th World Championships	Christchurch, New Zealand	25th
2003	11th World Championships	Kingston, Jamaica	12th

Pacific Games
Year	Games	Event	Location	Placing
1963	I Games	Basketball 7's	Suva, Fiji	5th
2003	XII Games	Netball	Suva, Fiji	8th
2023	XVII Games	Netball	Honiara, Solomon Islands	7th

Pacific Mini Games
Year	Games	Event	Location	Placing
2001	VI Games	Netball	Kingston, Norfolk Island	9th
2009	VIII Games	Netball	Rarotonga, Cook Islands	6th

== See also ==
- Netball in Niue
