= 2010 Pacific Netball Series =

Netball at the 2010 Pacific Netball Series
- Location: Rarotonga, Cook Islands
- Dates: 3–5 June 2010

Medalists
gold medal	Fiji
silver medal	Cook Islands
bronze medal	Samoa

The 2010 Pacific Netball series was held in Rarotonga, Cook Islands between 3–5 June 2010.

== Results ==
=== Table ===
	P	W	D	L	PTS
Fiji	3	3	0	0	6
Samoa	3	2	0	1	4
Cook Islands	3	1	0	2	2
Papua New Guinea	3	0	0	2	0

3 June 2011; 16:30	Report	Fiji	50 – 45	Samoa	Rarotonga, Cook Islands; Umpires: Lisa McPhail, Yvonne Morgan; Reserve umpire: Kristie Simpson

18:45	Report	Cook Islands	59 – 57	Papua New Guinea	Rarotonga, Cook Islands; Umpires: Kristie Simpson, Kim Sinclair; Reserve umpire: Lisa McPhail

4 June 2010; 16:30	Report	Samoa	57 – 54	Papua New Guinea	Rarotonga, Cook Islands; Umpires: Yvonne Morgan, Kristie Simpson; Reserve umpire: Kim Sinclair

18:45	Fiji	–	Cook Islands	Rarotonga, Cook Islands; Umpires: Lisa McPhail, Kim Sinclair; Reserve umpire: Yvonne Morgan

5 June 2010; 14:00	Report	Fiji	47 – 42	Papua New Guinea	Rarotonga, Cook Islands; Umpires: Yvonne Morgan, Kim Sinclair; Reserve umpire: Kristie Simpson

16:15	Report	Samoa	56 – 46	Cook Islands	Rarotonga, Cook Islands; Umpires: Lisa McPhail, Kristie Simpson; Reserve umpire: Kim Sinclair

== Final standings ==
Place	Nation
Gold	Fiji
Silver	Samoa
Bronze	Cook Islands
4	Papua New Guinea

== See also ==
- Pacific Netball Series
