= Netball at the 2001 South Pacific Mini Games =

- Location: Norfolk Island - Kingston
- Dates: December 2001
- Teams: 9

Medalists
gold medal	Fiji
silver medal	Papua New Guinea
bronze medal	Cook Islands

Netball at the 2001 South Pacific Mini Games in Kingston, Norfolk Island was held during December 2001.

== Preliminary round ==
=== Pool A ===
	P	W	L	Pts	F	A	%
Fiji	3	3	0	9	279	65	429
Papua New Guinea	3	2	1	7	240	103	233
Norfolk Island	3	1	2	5	123	186	66
American Samoa	3	0	3	3	28	316	9
Tonga	0	0	0	0	0	0	0

Qualified for the semifinals
Withdrew

December 2001	Fiji	129 – 3	Niue

December 2001	Norfolk Island	81 – 15	American Samoa

December 2001	Papua New Guinea	45 – 66	Fiji

December 2001	American Samoa	10 – 106	Papua New Guinea

December 2001	Norfolk Island	25 – 89	Papua New Guinea

=== Pool B ===
	P	W	L	Pts	F	A	%
Cook Islands	4	4	0	12	311	114	273
Samoa	4	3	1	10	215	140	154
Solomon Islands	4	2	2	8	170	184	92
Vanuatu	4	1	3	6	168	211	80
Niue	4	0	4	4	78	293	27

Qualified for the semifinals

December 2001	Niue	11 – 65	Samoa

December 2001	Cook Islands	78 – 35	Vanuatu

December 2001	Solomon Islands	28 – 58	Samoa

December 2001	Niue	13 – 105	Cook Islands

December 2001	Solomon Islands	47 – 35	Vanuatu

December 2001	Samoa	36 – 61	Cook Islands

December 2001	Solomon Islands	30 – 67	Cook Islands

December 2001	Vanuatu	58 – 30	Niue

December 2001	Solomon Islands	65 – 24	Niue

December 2001	Vanuatu	40 – 56	Samoa

== Placement matches ==
=== 7th/8th match ===
December 2001	Vanuatu	65 – 37	American Samoa

=== 5th/6th match ===
December 2001	Solomon Islands	47 – 12	Norfolk Island

=== Bronze medal match ===
December 2001	Cook Islands	76 – 32	Samoa

=== Gold Medal match ===
December 2001	Fiji	64 – 38	Papua New Guinea

== Final standings ==
Place	Nation
Gold	Fiji
Silver	Papua New Guinea
Bronze	Cook Islands
4	Samoa
5	Solomon Islands
6	Norfolk Island
7	Vanuatu
8	American Samoa
9	Niue
-	Tonga

== See also ==
- Netball at the Pacific Mini Games
