= 2013 Pacific Netball Series =

Netball at the 2013 Pacific Netball Series
- Location: Samoa
- Dates: 4–6 June 2013

Medalists
gold medal	Fiji
silver medal	Papua New Guinea
bronze medal	Samoa

The 2013 Pacific Netball series was held in Samoa between 4–6 June 2013.

== Results ==
=== Table ===
Team	P	W	D	L	PTS
Fiji	3	3	0	0	6
Papua New Guinea	3	2	0	1	4
Samoa	3	1	0	2	2
Cook Islands	3	0	0	3	0

4 June 2013; 14:15	Report	Fiji	59 – 45	Papua New Guinea

16:30	Report	Cook Islands	46 – 48	Samoa

5 June 2013; 14:15	Report	Samoa	48 – 56	Papua New Guinea

16:30	Report	Fiji	60 – 41	Cook Islands

6 June 2013; 14:15	Report	Papua New Guinea	67 – 53	Cook Islands

16:30	Report	Samoa	34 – 58	Fiji

== Final standings ==
Place	Nation
Gold	Fiji
Silver	Papua New Guinea
Bronze	Samoa
4	Cook Islands

== See also ==
- Pacific Netball Series
