= 2011 Pacific Netball Series =

Netball at the 2011 Pacific Netball Series
- Location: Port Moresby, Papua New Guinea
- Dates: 7–9 June 2011

Medalists
gold medal	Fiji
silver medal	Cook Islands
bronze medal	Samoa

The 2011 Pacific Netball Series was held in Port Moresby, Papua New Guinea between 7–9 June 2011.

== Results ==
=== Table ===
	P	W	D	L	PTS	F	A	%
Fiji	3	3	0	0	6	169	105	160.95
Cook Islands	3	2	0	1	4	131	118	111.02
Samoa	3	1	0	2	2	132	142	92.96
Papua New Guinea	3	0	0	3	0	118	185	63.78

7 June 2011; 15:00	Report	Fiji	48 – 35	Samoa	Sir John Guise Stadium

17:00	Report	Cook Islands	51 – 34	Papua New Guinea	Sir John Guise Stadium

8 June 2011; 15:00	Report	Samoa	62 – 50	Papua New Guinea	Sir John Guise Stadium

18:30	Report	Fiji	49 – 36	Cook Islands	Sir John Guise Stadium

9 June 2011; 15:00	Report	Samoa	35 – 44	Cook Islands	Sir John Guise Stadium

17:30	Report	Papua New Guinea	34 – 72	Fiji	Sir John Guise Stadium

== Final standings ==
Place	Nation
Gold	Fiji
Silver	Cook Islands
Bronze	Samoa
4	Papua New Guinea
