= Netball at the 1997 South Pacific Mini Games =

- Location: Pago Pago, American Samoa
- Dates: from 12–18 August 1997
- Teams: 6

Medalists
| gold medal | Cook Islands |
| silver medal | Fiji |
| bronze medal | Papua New Guinea |

Netball at the 1997 South Pacific Mini Games in Pago Pago, American Samoa was held from 12–18 August 1997.

== Results ==
=== Pool games ===
| | P | W | D | L | PTS | F | A | F/A |
|---|---|---|---|---|---|---|---|---|
| Cook Islands | 5 | 5 | 0 | 0 | 15 | 433 | 165 | +268 |
| Fiji | 5 | 4 | 0 | 1 | 13 | 288 | 158 | +130 |
| Papua New Guinea | 5 | 3 | 0 | 2 | 11 | 242 | 207 | +35 |
| Samoa | 5 | 2 | 0 | 3 | 9 | 217 | 220 | -3 |
| Solomon Islands | 5 | 1 | 0 | 4 | 7 | 155 | 296 | -141 |
| American Samoa | 5 | 0 | 0 | 5 | 5 | 138 | 412 | -274 |

| Qualified for the semifinals |
| Qualified for the 5th/6th play off |

| 12 August 1997 | American Samoa | 26 – 48 | Solomon Islands | Pago Pago, American Samoa |

| Papua New Guinea | 41 – 38 | Samoa | Pago Pago, American Samoa |

| Cook Islands | 55 – 37 | Fiji | Pago Pago, American Samoa |

| Cook Islands | 67 – 46 | Papua New Guinea | Pago Pago, American Samoa |

| Fiji | 68 – 21 | Solomon Islands | Pago Pago, American Samoa |

| American Samoa | 24 – 69 | Samoa | Pago Pago, American Samoa |

| 14 August 1997 | Cook Islands | 81 – 30 | Samoa | Pago Pago, American Samoa |

| American Samoa | 19 – 91 | Fiji | Pago Pago, American Samoa |

| Papua New Guinea | 48 – 27 | Solomon Islands | Pago Pago, American Samoa |

| 15 August 1997 | American Samoa | 26 – 67 | Papua New Guinea | Pago Pago, American Samoa |

| Cook Islands | 97 – 28 | Solomon Islands | Pago Pago, American Samoa |

| Fiji | 43 – 23 | Samoa | Pago Pago, American Samoa |

| 16 August 1997 | Samoa | 57 – 31 | Solomon Islands | Pago Pago, American Samoa |

| Papua New Guinea | 40 – 49 | Fiji | Pago Pago, American Samoa |

| American Samoa | 24 – 107 | Cook Islands | Pago Pago, American Samoa |

=== 5th/6th play off ===
| 18 August 1997 | Solomon Islands | 53 – 43 | American Samoa | Pago Pago, American Samoa |

=== Bronze Medal match ===
| 18 August 1997 | Papua New Guinea | 59 – 37 | Samoa | Santa Rita, Guam |

=== Gold Medal match ===
| 18 August 1997 | Cook Islands | 92 – 34 | Fiji | Santa Rita, Guam |

== Final standings ==
| Place | Nation |
|---|---|
| Gold | Cook Islands |
| Silver | Fiji |
| Bronze | Papua New Guinea |
| 4 | Samoa |
| 5 | Solomon Islands |
| 6 | American Samoa |

== See also ==
- Netball at the Pacific Games
