= Netball at the 1966 South Pacific Games =

- Location: Nouméa, New Caledonia
- Dates: 8–18 December 1966

Medalists
gold medal	Cook Islands
silver medal	Fiji
bronze medal	Papua New Guinea

Netball at the 1966 South Pacific Games in Nouméa New Caledonia was held from 8–18 December 1966.

This was the second competition at the South Pacific Games for netball. The winner of the event was the Cook Islands over Fiji. Papua New Guinea took home the bronze.

== Placings ==
Place	Nation
Gold	Cook Islands
Silver	Fiji
Bronze	Papua New Guinea
4–6 order unknown	Western Samoa; Solomon Islands; New Caledonia

== See also ==
- Netball at the Pacific Games
