= American Samoa national netball team =

American Samoa
- Confederation: Oceania Netball Federation
Team colours

The American Samoa national netball team represent American Samoa in international netball.

The team competed in the 2019 Pacific Games in Apia, but was eliminated in the early rounds.

== Competitive history ==
Pacific Games
Year	Games	Event	Location	Placing
1963	I Games	Basketball 7's	Suva, Fiji	4th
2019	XVI Games	Netball	Apia, Samoa	8th

Pacific Mini Games
Year	Games	Event	Location	Placing
1993	IV Games	Netball	Port Vila, Vanuatu	9th
1997	V Games	Netball	Pago Pago, American Samoa	8th
2001	VI Games	Netball	Kingston, Norfolk Island	8th
