= Netball at the 2019 Pacific Games =

Sport played at the 2019 Pacific Games

- Location: Apia, Samoa
- Dates: 15–20 July 2019
- Teams: 8

Medalists
gold medal	Cook Islands
silver medal	Tonga
bronze medal	Papua New Guinea

Netball is one of the sports played at the 2019 Pacific Games which was held at Apia in Samoa. This is the twelfth time that netball has been in the games since its inclusion in 1963. The competition took place between 15 July to 20 July 2019. Eight nations were competing in the competition with the defending champions Fiji being absent due to competing at the 2019 Netball World Cup.

== Preliminary round ==
=== Group A ===
Pos	Team	Pld	W	D	L	GF	GA	%	Pts
1	Tonga	3	3	0	0	288	77	374.0	6
2	Papua New Guinea	3	2	0	1	233	73	319.2	4
3	Solomon Islands	3	1	0	2	109	196	55.6	2
4	American Samoa	3	0	0	3	48	332	14.5	0

15 July; 15:30	Papua New Guinea	116–10	American Samoa	Multisport Complex, Apia

15 July; 18:00	Tonga	94–24	Solomon Islands	Multisport Complex, Apia

16 July; 13:00	Report	Tonga	142–11	American Samoa	Multisport Complex, Apia

16 July; 20:30	Report	Papua New Guinea	75–11	Solomon Islands	Multisport Complex, Apia

17 July	Report	Tonga	52–42	Papua New Guinea	Multisport Complex, Apia

17 July	Report	Solomon Islands	74–27	American Samoa	Multisport Complex, Apia

=== Group B ===
Pos	Team	Pld	W	D	L	GF	GA	%	Pts
1	Cook Islands	3	3	0	0	217	89	243.8	6
2	Samoa	3	2	0	1	230	97	237.1	4
3	Tokelau	3	1	0	2	110	166	66.3	2
4	Norfolk Island	3	0	0	3	45	250	18.0	0

15 July; 13:00	Samoa	95–12	Norfolk Island	Multisport Complex, Apia

15 July; 20:30	Cook Islands	67–20	Tokelau	Multisport Complex, Apia

16 July; 15:30	Report	Cook Islands	91–16	Norfolk Island	Multisport Complex, Apia

16 July; 18:00	Report	Samoa	82–26	Tokelau	Multisport Complex, Apia

17 July	Report	Cook Islands	59–53	Samoa	Multisport Complex, Apia

17 July	Report	Tokelau	64–17	Norfolk Island	Multisport Complex, Apia

== Consolation Stage ==
=== Semi-finals ===
18 July; 13:00	Solomon Islands	42–36	Norfolk Island	Multisport Complex, Apia

18 July; 15:30	Tokelau	def	American Samoa	Multisport Complex, Apia

=== 7th place match ===
19 July; 13:00	Norfolk Island	67–16	American Samoa	Multisport Complex, Apia

=== 5th place match ===
19 July; 15:30	Tokelau	64–30	Solomon Islands	Multisport Complex, Apia

== Knockout stage ==
Semifinals
18 July - Apia
Cook Islands	58
Papua New Guinea	31
18 July - Apia
Tonga	48
Samoa	44

Final
19 July - Apia
Cook Islands	44
Tonga	43
Third place
19 July - Apia
Papua New Guinea	64
Samoa	35

=== Semi-finals ===
18 July; 18:00	Report	Cook Islands	58–31	Papua New Guinea	Multisport Complex, Apia

18 July; 20:30	Report	Samoa	44–48	Tonga	Multisport Complex, Apia

=== Third place match ===
19 July; 18:00	Report	Papua New Guinea	64–35	Samoa	Multisport Complex, Apia

=== Final ===
19 July; 20:30	Report	Tonga	43–44	Cook Islands	Multisport Complex, Apia

== Final standings ==
Place	Nation
Gold	Cook Islands
Silver	Tonga
Bronze	Papua New Guinea
4	Samoa
5	Tokelau
6	Solomon Islands
7	Norfolk Island
8	American Samoa

== See also ==
- Netball at the Pacific Games
