= Joanne Zinzan =

England netball international

Personal information
- Full name: Joanne Zinzan

Netball career
- Playing positions: GD, WD
Years	National team	Caps
199x–200x	England	
Medal record
Representing England
World Netball Championships
Bronze medal – third place	1999 Christchurch	Team
Commonwealth Games
Bronze medal – third place	1998 Kuala Lumpur	Team

Joanne Zinzan is a former England netball international. She was a member of the England teams that won bronze medals at the 1998 Commonwealth Games and the 1999 World Netball Championships. She captained the team at the 1999 World Netball Championships.

== Playing career ==
=== England ===
She was a member of the England teams that won bronze medals at the 1998 Commonwealth Games and the 1999 World Netball Championships. She captained the team at the 1999 World Netball Championships. In June 2000, she also captained England during a series in New Zealand.

Tournaments	Place
1998 Commonwealth Games	3rd place, bronze medalist(s)
1999 World Netball Championships	3rd place, bronze medalist(s)
