= Nauru national netball team =

National netball team

Nauru
- Confederation: Oceania Netball Federation

Netball World Cup
- Appearances: none

Commonwealth Games
- Appearances: none

The Nauru national netball team represents Nauru in international netball. Their only recorded official tournament was at the Netball at the 1985 South Pacific Mini Games.

== Competitive record ==
Pacific Mini Games
Year	Games	Event	Location	Placing
1985	II Games	Netball	Rarotonga, Cook Islands	4th
