= Tee Salanoa =

Samoan Australian netball player (born 1999)

Tahnyshavaughn Salanoa (born 21 July 1999) is a Samoan Australian netball player who plays as a goal attack or goal shooter. She has represented Samoa internationally as part of the Samoa national netball team.

Salanoa is from Melbourne, Australia. She plays for City West Falcons in the Victorian Netball League.

In 2017, she was selected for the Samoa national under-21 netball team for the 2017 International Youth Netball Series, and then for the 2017 Netball World Youth Cup in Gaborone, Botswana. In November 2017, she was selected for the Samoa national netball team for its tour of Scotland. In 2019, she played in the 2019 Netball World Cup, where she was named player of the match in Samoa's win against Singapore.
