= Jimaima Kete =

Fijian netball player

Jimaima Kete (born 2001 or 2002) is a Fijian netball player who plays as a goal attack. She has represented Fiji internationally as part of the Fiji national netball team.

Kete is from Matuku in Lau Province and was educated at Assemblies of God Primary School, Veiuto Primary School and Suva Grammar School. She began playing netball at primary school. She is a student at Fiji National University.

In February 2022 she was selected for the PacificAus Sports Series in Sydney. In November 2022 she was selected to captain the team for the 2022 Netball Singapore Nations Cup. She was later selected in the team for the 2023 Netball World Cup in South Africa.
