= Larafina Tanielu-Stowers =

Samoan netball player

Larafina Tanielu-Stowers is a Samoan netball player who plays as a goal shoot and goal keeper. She has represented Samoa internationally at the Pacific Games and as part of the Samoa national netball team.

Tanielu-Stowers had her early primary school education in New Zealand then moved to Samoa when she was eight attending primary and high school in Samoa. She has played netball since the age of five, and currently plays for St Marys Sports Club (SMSC).

In April 2019 she was selected for the Samoan team for the 2019 Pacific Games in Apia. In May 2020 she was selected for the Samoa national under-21 netball team. In October 2020 she was selected for the "long squad" for the later-cancelled 2021 Netball World Youth Cup. In March 2022 she was selected for the Samoa national netball team for the PacificAus Sports Netball Series, but was unable to attend due to covid travel restrictions. In July 2022 she was selected to the team for the Oceania World Cup qualifiers.
