= Vaiti Waqatabu =

Fijian netball and rugby union player

Vaiti Waqatabu (born 1986 or 1987) is a Fijian netball and rugby player who has captained the Fiji national netball team.

Waqatabu is from Rewasa in Ra Province and was educated at Adi Cakobau School. She works as a corrections officer.

== Netball career ==
Waqatabu was first selected for the Fiji national netball team in 2009. She was dropped from the team for the 2015 Netball World Cup, but was selected in 2017 as team captain.

In February 2022 she was selected for the PacificAus Sports Series in Sydney. In November 2022 she was selected to captain the team for the 2022 Netball Singapore Nations Cup.

== Rugby career ==
In 2015 she switched sports to join the Fiji women's national rugby sevens team, making her first appearance at the Dubai sevens in 2016. In 2018 she joined the Fiji women's national rugby union team.
