= Netball at the 1979 South Pacific Games =

- Location: Suva, Fiji
- Dates: 8–18 December 1966

Medalists
gold medal	Fiji
silver medal	Cook Islands
bronze medal	Papua New Guinea

Netball at the 1979 South Pacific Games in Suva Fiji was held from 28 August to 8 September 1979.

This was the fourth competition at the South Pacific Games for netball after missing the 1971 South Pacific Games and 1975 South Pacific Games. The winner of the event were the Fiji over the Cook Islands. Papua New Guinea took home the bronze.

== Final standings ==
Place	Nation
Gold	Fiji
Silver	Cook Islands
Bronze	Papua New Guinea

== See also ==
- Netball at the Pacific Games
