= Netball at the 1985 South Pacific Mini Games =

- Location: Rarotonga, Cook Islands
- Dates: 31 July to 9 August 1985

Medalists
gold medal	Cook Islands
silver medal	Papua New Guinea
bronze medal	Tonga

Netball at the 1985 South Pacific Mini Games in Rarotonga, the Cook Islands was held from 31 July to 9 August 1985.

== Results ==
=== Pool games ===
Report	Papua New Guinea	117 – 9	Nauru	Raratonga

=== Gold Medal match ===
Report	Cook Islands	64 – 24	Papua New Guinea	Raratonga

== Final standings ==
Place	Nation
Gold	Cook Islands
Silver	Papua New Guinea
Bronze	Tonga
	Nauru

== See also ==
- Netball at the Pacific Games
