= Alisi Galo =

Fijian netball player (born 1996)

Personal information
- Born: 25 May 1996 (age 30)
- Occupation: netball player
- Height: 1.78 m (5 ft 10 in)

Netball career
- Playing positions: center, wing defense

Alisi Galo also known as Aliso Galo (born 25 May 1996) is a Fijian netball player who plays for Fiji in the positions of center or wing defense. She was included in the Fijian squad for the 2019 Netball World Cup, which was also her maiden appearance at a Netball World Cup.

She also represented Fiji at the 2018 Commonwealth Games, her maiden appearance at a Commonwealth Games event.

In November 2022 she was selected for the team for the 2022 Netball Singapore Nations Cup.
