= Soli Ropati =

Samoan netball player

Soli Ropati (born 19 May 1997) is a Samoan netball player who plays as a wing defence. She has represented Samoa internationally as part of the Samoa national netball team and plays for City West Falcons in the Victorian Netball League.

In 2017 Ropati was captain of the Samoa under-21 netball team for the 2017 International Youth Netball Series, and then vice-captain for the 2017 Netball World Youth Cup in Gaborone, Botswana. In November 2017 she was selected for the Samoa national netball team for its tour of Scotland. In 2019 she played in the 2019 Netball World Cup. In 2022 she was selected for the PacificAus Sports Netball Series, and then for the Oceania World Cup Qualifiers.

In 2022 Ropati won the Ballarat Football Netball League's Sally McLean Medal.
