= Solomon Islands national netball team =

Netball team of Solomon Islands

Solomon Islands
- Confederation: Oceania Netball Federation
Team colours

Netball World Cup
- Appearances: none

Commonwealth Games
- Appearances: none

The Solomon Islands national netball team represents Solomon Islands in international netball. The team competes mainly in tournaments within Oceania, such as the Pacific Games. Their most competitive result to date is a bronze medal at the 1981 South Pacific Mini Games.

The Solomon Islands was one of two national teams to compete in netball at the 1969 South Pacific Games, finishing second behind Papua New Guinea, but were not awarded a medal.

== Competition history ==
Pacific Games
Year	Games	Event	Location	Placing
1969	II Games	Netball	Port Moresby, Papua New Guinea	2nd
2003	XII Games	Netball	Suva, Fiji	7th
2007	XIII Games	Netball	Apia, Samoa	6th
2015	XV Games	Netball	Port Moresby, Papua New Guinea	7th
2023	XVII Games	Netball	Honiara, Solomon Islands	7th

Pacific Mini Games
Year	Games	Event	Location	Placing
1981	I Games	Netball	Honiara, Solomon Islands	3rd
1993	IV Games	Netball	Port Vila, Vanuatu	6th
2001	VI Games	Netball	Kingston, Norfolk Island	5th
2017	X Games	Netball	Port Vila, Vanuatu	3rd
