= Netball at the 1963 South Pacific Games =

- Location: Suva, Fiji
- Dates: 30 August - 4 September 1963
- Teams: 5

Medalists
gold medal	Fiji
silver medal	Western Samoa
bronze medal	Papua New Guinea

Netball at the 1963 South Pacific Games in Suva, Fiji was held from 30 August to 4 September 1963.

== Format ==
The five teams played a single round-robin, with medals awarded to the top-placed three teams.

== Results ==
=== Final standings ===
Team	P	W	D	L	PTS	F	A	F/A
Fiji	4	4	0	0	8	129	67	+62
Western Samoa	4	3	0	1	6	137	64	+73
Papua New Guinea	4	2	0	2	4	96	75	+21
American Samoa	4	0	1	3	1	41	104	−63
Niue	4	0	1	3	1	47	140	−93

=== Matches ===
30 August 1963	Western Samoa	26 – 18	Papua New Guinea	Suva, Fiji

Fiji	35 – 6	American Samoa	Suva, Fiji

31 August 1963	Western Samoa	32 – 8	American Samoa	Suva, Fiji

Papua New Guinea	33 – 9	Niue	Suva, Fiji

2 September 1963	Niue	15 – 15	American Samoa	Suva, Fiji

Western Samoa	26 – 27	Fiji	Suva, Fiji

3 September 1963	American Samoa	12 – 22	Papua New Guinea	Suva, Fiji

Fiji	27 – 26	Western Samoa	Suva, Fiji

4 September 1963	Niue	11 – 53	Western Samoa	Suva, Fiji

Fiji	28 – 23	Papua New Guinea	Suva, Fiji

== Placings ==
Place	Nation
Gold	Fiji
Silver	Western Samoa
Bronze	Papua New Guinea
4	American Samoa
5	Niue

== See also ==
- Netball at the Pacific Games
