= 2003 World Netball Championships =

Tournament details
- Host country: Jamaica
- Dates: 10–20 July 2003
- Teams: 24

Final positions
- Champions: New Zealand (4th title)
- Runners-up: Australia
- Third place: Jamaica

The 2003 World Netball Championships were the eleventh edition of the INF Netball World Cup, a quadrennial premier event in international netball. It was held in Kingston, Jamaica from 10 to 20 July. After 100 matches, New Zealand's Silver Ferns defeated Australia to take the title after its last title 16 years previously. The host country, Jamaica, finished third.

This marked the tournament's 40th anniversary, as it was founded in 1963.

== Preliminary games ==
The competition started with two days of two rounds of knockout games between the 16 unseeded nations for four spots in the championship stage of the competition. The losing 12 teams were placed in the consolation round.

=== Round One ===
10 July	Samoa	50–46	Antigua and Barbuda
10 July	Sri Lanka	81–18	Cayman Islands
10 July	Barbados	62–37	Saint Lucia
10 July	Scotland	53–16	Hong Kong
10 July	Canada	29–31	Grenada
10 July	Northern Ireland	39–48	Niue
10 July	Wales	36–45	Saint Vincent and the Grenadines
10 July	United States	60–31	Bermuda

=== Round Two ===
11 July	Samoa	61–36	Sri Lanka
11 July	Barbados	44–33	Scotland
11 July	Grenada	42–44	Niue
11 July	Saint Vincent and the Grenadines	33–46	United States

== Consolation round ==
=== Group A ===
Team	Points	P	W	L
Saint Vincent and the Grenadines	10	5	5	0
Wales	8	5	4	1
Sri Lanka	6	5	3	2
Antigua and Barbuda	4	5	2	3
Bermuda	2	5	1	4
Cayman Islands	0	5	0	5

12 July	Bermuda	30–69	Sri Lanka
12 July	Saint Vincent and the Grenadines	48–38	Antigua and Barbuda
12 July	Wales	79–20	Cayman Islands
13 July	Cayman Islands	36–81	Sri Lanka
13 July	Saint Vincent and the Grenadines	45–37	Wales
13 July	Bermuda	25–54	Antigua and Barbuda
14 July	Sri Lanka	46–52	Wales
14 July	Antigua and Barbuda	72–30	Cayman Islands
14 July	Saint Vincent and the Grenadines	50–24	Bermuda
15 July	Sri Lanka	46–62	Saint Vincent and the Grenadines
15 July	Cayman Islands	30–58	Bermuda
15 July	Antigua and Barbuda	43–52	Wales
16 July	Sri Lanka	67–59	Antigua and Barbuda
16 July	Bermuda	24–49	Wales
16 July	Cayman Islands	24–71	Saint Vincent and the Grenadines

=== Group B ===
Team	Points	P	W	L
Scotland	10	5	5	0
Saint Lucia	8	5	4	1
Northern Ireland	6	5	3	2
Grenada	4	5	2	3
Canada	2	5	1	4
Hong Kong	0	5	0	5

12 July	Grenada	41–59	Saint Lucia
12 July	Northern Ireland	33–42	Scotland
12 July	Canada	52–20	Hong Kong
13 July	Hong Kong	18–41	Scotland
13 July	Canada	37–47	Grenada
13 July	Northern Ireland	35–49	Saint Lucia
14 July	Scotland	50–38	Canada
14 July	Saint Lucia	64–33	Hong Kong
14 July	Grenada	42–45	Northern Ireland
15 July	Hong Kong	28–55	Grenada
15 July	Scotland	41–34	Saint Lucia
15 July	Northern Ireland	45–31	Canada
16 July	Saint Lucia	46–30	Canada
16 July	Hong Kong	25–58	Northern Ireland
16 July	Scotland	53–31	Grenada

=== Placement Matches ===
17 July	Places 13–16	Saint Vincent and the Grenadines	44–42	Saint Lucia
17 July	Places 13–16	Wales	32–27	Scotland
17 July	Places 17–20	Antigua and Barbuda	58–45	Northern Ireland
17 July	Places 17–20	Sri Lanka	58–35	Grenada
17 July	Places 21–24	Bermuda	51–49	Hong Kong
17 July	Places 21–24	Canada	58–34	Cayman Islands
18 July	13th place	Saint Vincent and the Grenadines	51–30	Wales
18 July	15th place	Scotland	39–35	Saint Lucia
18 July	17th place	Sri Lanka	60–65	Antigua and Barbuda
18 July	19th place	Grenada	39–49	Northern Ireland
18 July	21st Place	Bermuda	33–43	Canada
18 July	23rd Place	Hong Kong	39–36	Cayman Islands

== Championship Round ==
The four top teams in each group qualified for the quarter-finals.

=== Group A ===
Team	Points	P	W	L
Australia	10	5	5	0
Jamaica	8	5	4	1
South Africa	6	5	3	2
Samoa	4	5	2	3
Trinidad and Tobago	2	5	1	4
United States	0	5	0	5

11 July	Trinidad and Tobago	30–89	Jamaica
12 July	Samoa	41–57	South Africa
12 July	Australia	84–28	United States
13 July	Samoa	27–76	Australia
13 July	Trinidad and Tobago	48–42	United States
13 July	South Africa	33–54	Jamaica
14 July	United States	38–55	South Africa
14 July	Jamaica	84–24	Samoa
14 July	Australia	80–28	Trinidad and Tobago
15 July	Trinidad and Tobago	35–50	Samoa
15 July	Jamaica	85–20	United States
15 July	South Africa	37–64	Australia
16 July	United States	44–52	Samoa
16 July	South Africa	51–49	Trinidad and Tobago
16 July	Jamaica	43–48	Australia

=== Group B ===
Team	Points	P	W	L
New Zealand	10	5	5	0
England	8	5	4	1
Fiji	6	5	3	2
Barbados	4	5	2	3
Cook Islands	2	5	1	4
Niue	0	5	0	5

12 July	Barbados	49–55	Fiji
12 July	Niue	11–99	New Zealand
12 July	Cook Islands	22–90	England
13 July	Barbados	45–84	New Zealand
13 July	Fiji	30–62	England
13 July	Cook Islands	47–37	Niue
14 July	England	80–27	Barbados
14 July	New Zealand	107–17	Cook Islands
14 July	Niue	17–59	Fiji
15 July	Niue	31–67	Barbados
15 July	Fiji	67–40	Cook Islands
15 July	England	41–60	New Zealand
16 July	Cook Islands	39–56	Barbados
16 July	England	67–21	Niue
16 July	Fiji	24–79	New Zealand

=== Placement Matches ===
17 July	Places 9–12	Trinidad and Tobago	60–40	Niue
17 July	Places 9–12	United States	62–38	Cook Islands
18 July	9th place	Trinidad and Tobago	49–52	United States
18 July	11th place	Cook Islands	49–39	Niue

=== Last Eight ===
18 July	Quarter Final	South Africa	41–44	England
18 July 2003	Quarter Final	Australia	62–35	Barbados
18 July 2003	Quarter Final	Jamaica	74–38	Fiji
18 July 2003	Quarter Final	Samoa	28–81	New Zealand
19 July 2003	Places 5–8	South Africa	54–35	Barbados
19 July 2003	Places 5–8	Fiji	47–50	Samoa
19 July 2003	Semi Final	Australia	45–37	England
19 July 2003	Semi Final	New Zealand	56–37	Jamaica
20 July 2003	7th place	Barbados	47–45	Fiji
20 July 2003	5th place	Samoa	47–56	South Africa
20 July 2003	3rd Place	England	40–46	Jamaica
20 July 2003	Final	New Zealand	49–47	Australia

== Final rankings ==
Place	Nation
Gold	New Zealand
Silver	Australia
Bronze	Jamaica
4	England
5	South Africa
6	Samoa
7	Barbados
8	Fiji
9	United States
10	Trinidad and Tobago
11	Cook Islands
12	Niue
13	Saint Vincent and the Grenadines
14	Wales
15	Scotland
16	Saint Lucia
17	Antigua and Barbuda
18	Sri Lanka
19	Northern Ireland
20	Grenada
21	Canada
22	Bermuda
23	Hong Kong
24	Cayman Islands

== Medallists ==
Gold	Silver	Bronze
New Zealand; Coach: Ruth Aitken	Australia; Coach: Jill McIntosh	Jamaica; Coach: Maureen Hall
Sheryl Clarke; Belinda Colling; Tania Dalton; Vilimaina Davu; Leana du Plooy; Temepara George; Lesley Nicol; Anna Rowberry (c); Anna Scarlett; Jodi Te Huna; Irene van Dyk; Adine Wilson	Alison Broadbent; Natasha Chokljat; Catherine Cox; Liz Ellis (vc); Kathryn Harby-Williams (c); Janine Ilitch; Sharelle McMahon; Cynna Neele; Nicole Richardson; Rebecca Sanders; Peta Scholz; Eloise Southby	Nadine Bryan; Althea Byfield; Elaine Davis (vc); Kasey Evering; Simone Forbes; Connie Francis; Nichala Gibson; Georgia Gordon; Oberon Pitterson (c); Sharon Wiles; Carla Williams; Tiffany Wolfe
