= Netball at the 1983 South Pacific Games =

- Location: Apia, Samoa
- Dates: 5–16 September 1983

Medalists
gold medal	Cook Islands
silver medal	Fiji
bronze medal	Tonga

Netball at the 1983 South Pacific Games in Apia, Samoa was held from 5–16 September 1983.

This was the fifth competition at the South Pacific Games for netball. The winner of the event were the Cook Islands over the Fiji. Tonga took home the bronze.

== Final standings ==
Place	Nation
Gold	Cook Islands
Silver	Fiji
Bronze	Tonga

== See also ==
- Netball at the Pacific Games
