= 1999 World Netball Championships =

Tournament details
- Host country: New Zealand
- Dates: 21 September – 2 October 1999
- Teams: 26

Final positions
- Champions: Australia (8th title)
- Runners-up: New Zealand
- Third place: England

Tournament statistics
- Matches played: 89

The 1999 World Netball Championships (also known as the Vodafone World Netball Championships for sponsorship reasons) was the tenth edition of the INF Netball World Cup, a quadrennial premier event in international netball. It was held in Christchurch, New Zealand, from 21 September to 2 October 1999 and featured 26 teams with the debut of Niue, Tonga and Zambia. All matches were held at the Westpac Arena.

Fourteen teams entered the preliminary round with four teams qualifying to the main round where they were joined by the top twelve teams from the 1995 championships. The main round saw sixteen teams remaining, be split into two groups of eight with the top four qualifying to the quarter-finals while the remaining eight played in classification matches for 9th–16th placings.

Australia and New Zealand defeated England and Jamaica in the semi-finals, for a repeat of the 1995 final. Australia defended its seventh title defeating New Zealand in the final on a final-second shot by Sharelle McMahon, after coming back from six goals down at three-quarter time. England claimed the bronze medal, defeating Jamaica by fourteen goals.

== Preliminary rounds ==
The competition started with two days of sixteen teams contesting in two rounds of knockout matches for the four remaining spots in the main competition, the remaining twelve teams entered the consolation round. Pakistan and Botswana were also meant to compete in the tournament but had to withdraw.

=== Round 1 ===
The opening day of the competition started with wins for six teams with Wales securing the widest point spread of the day with an 82–13 romp over Vanuatu which saw Mair Evans scoring 57 goals. For Scotland, they had a nervous start in their match against the Cayman Islands with Scotland only leading by three goals at the half time break. But a switch to bring in Gail Higgins into goal attack saw the Scots win by 29 goals. Zambia had the closest match of the opening day with their match over Papua New Guinea having a margin of only two goals in what was a see-saw match. There was also wins for Fiji, Tonga and Malaysia who opened their 1999 campaign with a win.

21 September; 8:45	Zambia	51–49	Papua New Guinea	Westpac Arena Court 1, Christchurch
21 September; 8:45	Scoring by quarter: 11–13, 14–11, 13–14, 13–11			Westpac Arena Court 1, Christchurch

21 September; 10:30	Wales	82–13	Vanuatu	Westpac Arena Court 1, Christchurch
21 September; 10:30	Scoring by quarter: 21–4, 21–6, 26–1, 14–2			Westpac Arena Court 1, Christchurch
21 September; 10:30	Mair Evans 57/79 (72%); Nicola Lewis 20/31 (65%) ??? 5			Westpac Arena Court 1, Christchurch

21 September; 15:45	Fiji	61–21	Sri Lanka	Westpac Arena Court 1, Christchurch
21 September; 15:45	Scoring by quarter: 16–7, 18–0, 12–6, 15–8			Westpac Arena Court 1, Christchurch

21 September; 17:30	Scotland	48–19	Cayman Islands	Westpac Arena Court 1, Christchurch
21 September; 17:30	Scoring by quarter: 9–8, 8–6, 15–5, 16–0			Westpac Arena Court 1, Christchurch

21 September; 19:15	Tonga	57–32	Hong Kong	Westpac Arena Court 1, Christchurch
21 September; 19:15	Scoring by quarter: 15–9, 14–8, 13–7, 15–8			Westpac Arena Court 1, Christchurch

21 September; 21:00	Malaysia	65–33	Niue	Westpac Arena Court 1, Christchurch
21 September; 21:00	Scoring by quarter: 15–9, 12–11, 17–5, 21–8			Westpac Arena Court 1, Christchurch

=== Round 2 ===
Day two of the 1999 edition saw the remaining eight teams in the preliminary round ply in four matches to determine the final four spots in the top 16. In the biggest victory of the day, Fiji defeated Zambia by twenty nine goals off the back of a blistering start while fellow Pacific neighbours Tonga lost their second round match to Northern Ireland after conceding sixteen goals in the third quarter while only scoring five. Wales built a solid lead in the first two quarter finals to overcome Scotland by eighteen goals despite Scotland winning the final quarter. The final match of the preliminary round saw Singapore sealed a twenty-two goal victory over Malaysia off the back of former Australian B goal-shooter Jocelyn Bryant as she scored 44 goals from 49 attempts.

22 September; 8:45	Fiji	68–39	Zambia	Westpac Arena Court 1, Christchurch
22 September; 8:45	Scoring by quarter: 21–10, 14–12, 14–8, 19–9			Westpac Arena Court 1, Christchurch

22 September; 10:30	Wales	54–36	Scotland	Westpac Arena Court 1, Christchurch
22 September; 10:30	Scoring by quarter: 14–5, 14–10, 18–9, 8–12			Westpac Arena Court 1, Christchurch

22 September; 12:15	Northern Ireland	50–41	Tonga	Westpac Arena Court 1, Christchurch
22 September; 12:15	Scoring by quarter: 11–15, 12–8, 16–5, 11–13			Westpac Arena Court 1, Christchurch

22 September; 14:00	Singapore	68–46	Malaysia	Westpac Arena Court 1, Christchurch
22 September; 14:00	Scoring by quarter: 13–12, 20–10, 19–11, 16–13			Westpac Arena Court 1, Christchurch
22 September; 14:00	Jocelyn Bryant 44/49 (90%); Gng Yen Sin 24/25 (96%)			Westpac Arena Court 1, Christchurch

== Consolation round ==
=== Group A ===
Pos	Team	Pld	W	D	L	GF	GA	GD	Pts
1	Zambia	4	4	0	0	272	110	+162	8
2	Malaysia	4	3	0	1	238	133	+105	6
3	Cayman Islands	4	2	0	2	165	207	−42	4
4	Hong Kong	4	1	0	3	133	196	−63	2
5	Vanuatu	4	0	0	4	106	268	–162	0

23 September; 14:30	Hong Kong	53–27	Vanuatu	Westpac Arena Court 2, Christchurch

23 September; 16:15	Malaysia	60–19	Cayman Islands	Westpac Arena Court 2, Christchurch
23 September; 16:15	Scoring by half: 33–11, 27–8			Westpac Arena Court 2, Christchurch

24 September; 11:00	Malaysia	60–30	Hong Kong	Westpac Arena Court 2, Christchurch
24 September; 11:00	Scoring by quarter: 14–6, 13–1, 17–16, 16–7			Westpac Arena Court 2, Christchurch

24 September; 16:15	Zambia	80–18	Vanuatu	Westpac Arena Court 2, Christchurch
24 September; 16:15	Scoring by quarter: 19–4, 23–4, 17–4, 21–6			Westpac Arena Court 2, Christchurch

25 September; 12:45	Zambia	76–36	Cayman Islands	Westpac Arena Court 2, Christchurch
25 September; 12:45	Scoring by quarter: 19–8, 17–14, 24–6, 16–8			Westpac Arena Court 2, Christchurch

25 September; 16:15	Malaysia	79–23	Vanuatu	Westpac Arena Court 2, Christchurch
25 September; 16:15	Scoring by quarter: 12–6, 19–6, 26–3, 22–8			Westpac Arena Court 2, Christchurch

26 September; 12:45	Zambia	55–17	Hong Kong	Westpac Arena Court 2, Christchurch
26 September; 12:45	Scoring by quarter: 13–4, 12–3, 17–4, 13–6			Westpac Arena Court 2, Christchurch

26 September; 14:30	Cayman Islands	56–38	Vanuatu	Westpac Arena Court 2, Christchurch
26 September; 14:30	Scoring by quarter: 16–8, 13–10, 16–8, 11–12			Westpac Arena Court 2, Christchurch

27 September; 14:30	Cayman Islands	54–33	Hong Kong	Westpac Arena Court 2, Christchurch
27 September; 14:30	Scoring by quarter: 12–10, 14–8, 15–7, 13–8			Westpac Arena Court 2, Christchurch

27 September; 18:00	Zambia	61–39	Malaysia	Westpac Arena Court 2, Christchurch
27 September; 18:00	Scoring by quarter: 13–9, 12–11, 20–8, 16–11			Westpac Arena Court 2, Christchurch

=== Group B ===
Pos	Team	Pld	W	D	L	GF	GA	GD	Pts
1	Papua New Guinea	4	4	0	0	222	159	+63	8
2	Scotland	4	3	0	1	184	160	+24	6
3	Tonga	4	2	0	2	185	191	−6	4
4	Sri Lanka	4	1	0	3	178	184	−6	2
5	Niue	4	0	0	4	151	226	–75	0

23 September; 18:00	Papua New Guinea	66–24	Niue	Westpac Arena Court 2, Christchurch

23 September; 19:45	Tonga	47–43	Sri Lanka	Westpac Arena Court 2, Christchurch
23 September; 19:45	Scoring by quarter: 10–14, 12–9, 11–6, 14–14			Westpac Arena Court 2, Christchurch

24 September; 14:30	Papua New Guinea	53–47	Tonga	Westpac Arena Court 2, Christchurch

24 September; 18:00	Scotland	51–41	Niue	Westpac Arena Court 2, Christchurch
24 September; 18:00	Scoring by quarter: 15–7, 11–16, 14–6, 11–12			Westpac Arena Court 2, Christchurch

25 September; 14:30	Scotland	41–34	Sri Lanka	Westpac Arena Court 2, Christchurch

25 September; 19:45	Tonga	54–45	Niue	Westpac Arena Court 2, Christchurch
25 September; 19:45	Scoring by quarter: 13–14, 13–10, 14–11, 14–10			Westpac Arena Court 2, Christchurch

26 September; 9:15	Papua New Guinea	48–42	Scotland	Westpac Arena Court 2, Christchurch
26 September; 9:15	Scoring by quarter: 14–12, 10–10, 14–9, 10–11			Westpac Arena Court 2, Christchurch
26 September; 9:15	Gewa Raula 36/44 (82%); Jackie Niblett 7/11 (64%); Monalisa Leka 5/6 (83%)		Jennifer Dingwall 29/43 (67%); Lynne McCandish 8/17 (47%); Lesley MacDonald 5/13 (38%)	Westpac Arena Court 2, Christchurch

26 September; 16:15	Sri Lanka	55–41	Niue	Westpac Arena Court 2, Christchurch
26 September; 16:15	Scoring by quarter: 20–8, 12–9, 12–11, 11–13			Westpac Arena Court 2, Christchurch
26 September; 16:15	Deepti Ruapsinghe 33/47 (70%); Jayabthi da Silva 18/34 (53%); Manoji Galhenage 4/4 (100%)		Crystal Folomu 26/36 (72%); Nadia Tafea 12/14 (86%); Julie Folomu 3/5 (60%)	Westpac Arena Court 2, Christchurch

27 September; 11:00	Papua New Guinea	55–46	Sri Lanka	Westpac Arena Court 2, Christchurch
27 September; 11:00	Scoring by quarter: 13–16, 12–12, 19–8, 11–10			Westpac Arena Court 2, Christchurch

27 September; 14:30	Scotland	50–37	Tonga	Westpac Arena Court 2, Christchurch
27 September; 14:30	Scoring by quarter: 13–12, 17–7, 7–11, 13–7			Westpac Arena Court 2, Christchurch

=== Semi-finals ===
28 September; 9:15	Zambia	53–36	Scotland	Westpac Arena Court 2, Christchurch
28 September; 9:15	Scoring by quarter: 14–9, 15–10, 11–9, 13–8			Westpac Arena Court 2, Christchurch

28 September; 11:00	Papua New Guinea	56–48	Malaysia	Westpac Arena Court 2, Christchurch
28 September; 11:00	Scoring by quarter: 8–13, 13–10, 17–9, 18–16			Westpac Arena Court 2, Christchurch

28 September; 12:45	Sri Lanka	64–36	Cayman Islands	Westpac Arena Court 2, Christchurch
28 September; 12:45	Scoring by quarter: 18–10, 20–4, 11–12, 15–10			Westpac Arena Court 2, Christchurch

28 September; 16:15	Tonga	59–32	Hong Kong	Westpac Arena Court 2, Christchurch
28 September; 16:15	Scoring by quarter: 11–11, 17–8, 14–9, 17–4			Westpac Arena Court 2, Christchurch

=== Placement matches ===
29 September; 9:15	Malaysia	48–37	Scotland	Westpac Arena Court 2, Christchurch
29 September; 9:15	Scoring by quarter: 13–4, 6–10, 15–8, 14–15			Westpac Arena Court 2, Christchurch

29 September; 11:00	Zambia	57–44	Papua New Guinea	Westpac Arena Court 2, Christchurch
29 September; 11:00	Scoring by quarter: 17–14, 15–9, 14–12, 11–9			Westpac Arena Court 2, Christchurch

29 September; 14:30	Cayman Islands	42–32	Hong Kong	Westpac Arena Court 2, Christchurch

29 September; 16:15	Sri Lanka	53–49	Tonga	Westpac Arena Court 2, Christchurch
29 September; 16:15	Scoring by quarter: 12–13, 14–12, 15–11, 12–13			Westpac Arena Court 2, Christchurch

29 September; 19:45	Niue	51–30	Vanuatu	Westpac Arena Court 2, Christchurch
29 September; 19:45	Scoring by quarter: 11–7, 10–7, 15–9, 15–7			Westpac Arena Court 2, Christchurch

== Main round ==
=== Group A ===
Pos	Team	Pld	W	D	L	GF	GA	GD	Pts
1	Australia	7	7	0	0	506	254	+252	14
2	Jamaica	7	6	0	1	476	306	+170	12
3	England	7	5	0	2	472	317	+155	10
4	Fiji	7	4	0	3	413	365	+62	8
5	Samoa	7	3	0	4	367	394	−27	6
6	Singapore	7	2	0	5	351	483	−132	4
7	Malawi	7	1	0	6	318	484	−166	2
8	United States	7	0	0	7	263	563	−300	0

23 September; 8:45	England	63–33	Fiji	Westpac Arena Court 1, Christchurch
23 September; 8:45	Scoring by quarter: 14–10, 19–8, 18–7, 12–8			Westpac Arena Court 1, Christchurch

23 September; 12:45	Samoa	71–46	Malawi	Westpac Arena Court 1, Christchurch
23 September; 12:45	Scoring by quarter: 15–14, 17–13, 17–11, 22–8			Westpac Arena Court 1, Christchurch

23 September; 17:30	Australia	91–32	Singapore	Westpac Arena Court 1, Christchurch
23 September; 17:30	Scoring by quarter: 24–5, 16–12, 28–7, 23–8			Westpac Arena Court 1, Christchurch

23 September; 19:15	Jamaica	82–34	United States	Westpac Arena Court 1, Christchurch
23 September; 19:15	Scoring by quarter: 20–4, 20–8, 21–10, 21–12			Westpac Arena Court 1, Christchurch

24 September; 8:45	Fiji	68–45	Malawi	Westpac Arena Court 1, Christchurch
24 September; 8:45	Scoring by quarter: 17–8, 19–11, 14–11, 18–15			Westpac Arena Court 1, Christchurch

24 September; 12:15	England	90–39	United States	Westpac Arena Court 1, Christchurch
24 September; 12:15	Scoring by quarter: 32–7, 20–8, 22–13, 16–11			Westpac Arena Court 1, Christchurch

24 September; 14:00	Jamaica	76–40	Singapore	Westpac Arena Court 1, Christchurch
24 September; 14:00	Scoring by quarter: 17–14, 13–12, 23–8, 23–6			Westpac Arena Court 1, Christchurch

24 September; 19:30	Australia	74–38	Samoa	Westpac Arena Court 1, Christchurch
24 September; 19:30	Scoring by quarter: 19–11, 18–9, 18–8, 19–10			Westpac Arena Court 1, Christchurch

25 September; 12:15	Fiji	61–43	Samoa	Westpac Arena Court 1, Christchurch
25 September; 12:15	Scoring by quarter: 18–12, 13–13, 15–7, 15–11			Westpac Arena Court 1, Christchurch

25 September; 14:00	England	76–38	Malawi	Westpac Arena Court 1, Christchurch
25 September; 14:00	Scoring by quarter: 17–8, 22–9, 18–8, 19–13			Westpac Arena Court 1, Christchurch

25 September; 17:30	Australia	47–42	Jamaica	Westpac Arena Court 1, Christchurch
25 September; 17:30	Scoring by quarter: 12–8, 12–10, 10–12, 13–12			Westpac Arena Court 1, Christchurch

25 September; 18:00	Singapore	75–50	United States	Westpac Arena Court 2, Christchurch
25 September; 18:00	Scoring by quarter: 22–11, 18–13, 21–10, 14–16			Westpac Arena Court 2, Christchurch

26 September; 12:15	Samoa	71–36	United States	Westpac Arena Court 1, Christchurch
26 September; 12:15	Scoring by quarter: 18–10, 13–8, 25–7, 15–11			Westpac Arena Court 1, Christchurch

26 September; 15:45	Jamaica	84–36	Malawi	Westpac Arena Court 1, Christchurch
26 September; 15:45	Scoring by quarter: 29–9, 20–9, 18–7, 17–11			Westpac Arena Court 1, Christchurch

26 September; 17:30	Australia	59–44	England	Westpac Arena Court 1, Christchurch
26 September; 17:30	Scoring by quarter: 17–11, 16–7, 14–15, 12–11			Westpac Arena Court 1, Christchurch
26 September; 17:30	Jenny Borlase 38/48 (79%); Jacqui Delaney 21/33 (64%)		Tracey Neville 23/35 (66%); Alex Astle 15/21 (71%); Lyn Carpenter 6/8 (75%)	Westpac Arena Court 1, Christchurch

26 September; 19:45	Fiji	71–44	Singapore	Westpac Arena Court 2, Christchurch

27 September; 10:30	Jamaica	61–39	Samoa	Westpac Arena Court 1, Christchurch
27 September; 10:30	Scoring by quarter: 17–11, 18–8, 14–8, 12–12			Westpac Arena Court 1, Christchurch

27 September; 14:00	Australia	69–39	Fiji	Westpac Arena Court 1, Christchurch
27 September; 14:00	Scoring by quarter: 22–9, 18–7, 13–11, 16–12			Westpac Arena Court 1, Christchurch

27 September; 16:15	Malawi	64–45	United States	Westpac Arena Court 1, Christchurch
27 September; 16:15	Scoring by quarter: 18–13, 15–17, 16–13, 15–2			Westpac Arena Court 1, Christchurch

27 September; 17:30	England	77–42	Singapore	Westpac Arena Court 1, Christchurch
27 September; 17:30	Scoring by quarter: 26–10, 21–9, 14–13, 16–10			Westpac Arena Court 1, Christchurch

28 September; 10:30	Jamaica	69–51	Fiji	Westpac Arena Court 1, Christchurch
28 September; 10:30	Scoring by half: 32–26, 37–25			Westpac Arena Court 1, Christchurch

28 September; 14:00	Australia	91–27	United States	Westpac Arena Court 1, Christchurch
28 September; 14:00	Scoring by quarter: 26–3, 22–8, 27–6, 16–10			Westpac Arena Court 1, Christchurch

28 September; 14:30	Singapore	65–57	Malawi	Westpac Arena Court 2, Christchurch

28 September; 19:30	England	63–44	Samoa	Westpac Arena Court 1, Christchurch
28 September; 19:30	Scoring by quarter: 16–14, 19–8, 13–10, 15–12			Westpac Arena Court 1, Christchurch

29 September; 12:15	Fiji	90–32	United States	Westpac Arena Court 1, Christchurch
29 September; 12:15	Scoring by quarter: 26–4, 22–10, 18–7, 24–11			Westpac Arena Court 1, Christchurch

29 September; 12:15	Samoa	61–53	Singapore	Westpac Arena Court 1, Christchurch
29 September; 12:15	Scoring by quarter: 14–13, 15–15, 15–13, 17–12			Westpac Arena Court 1, Christchurch

29 September; 14:00	Jamaica	62–59	England	Westpac Arena Court 1, Christchurch
29 September; 14:00	Scoring by quarter: 22–19, 11–15, 14–14, 15–11			Westpac Arena Court 1, Christchurch
29 September; 14:00	Elaine Davis 43/47 (91%); Connie Francis 19/21 (90%)		Alex Astle 39/42 (93%); Tracey Neville 20/31 (65%)	Westpac Arena Court 1, Christchurch

29 September; 17:30	Australia	75–32	Malawi	Westpac Arena Court 1, Christchurch
29 September; 17:30	Scoring by quarter: 17–7, 17–9, 21–7, 20–9			Westpac Arena Court 1, Christchurch

=== Group B ===
Pos	Team	Pld	W	D	L	GF	GA	GD	Pts
1	New Zealand	7	7	0	0	542	233	+309	14
2	South Africa	7	6	0	1	514	254	+260	12
3	Cook Islands	7	5	0	2	419	347	+72	10
4	Trinidad and Tobago	7	4	0	3	382	375	+7	8
5	Barbados	7	3	0	4	334	339	−5	6
6	Canada	7	2	0	5	248	465	−217	4
7	Wales	7	1	0	6	267	413	−146	2
8	Northern Ireland	7	0	0	7	222	502	−280	0

22 September; 20:30	New Zealand	90–22	Canada	Westpac Arena Court 1, Christchurch; Attendance: 3,500
22 September; 20:30	Scoring by quarter: 24–2, 24–6, 18–5, 24–9			Westpac Arena Court 1, Christchurch; Attendance: 3,500

23 September; 10:30	Cook Islands	59–50	Barbados	Westpac Arena Court 1, Christchurch
23 September; 10:30	Scoring by quarter: 17–15, 14–12, 14–12, 14–11			Westpac Arena Court 1, Christchurch

23 September; 12:15	Trinidad and Tobago	78–32	Canada	Westpac Arena Court 1, Christchurch
23 September; 12:15	Scoring by quarter: 20–9, 18–9, 22–9, 18–5			Westpac Arena Court 1, Christchurch

23 September; 14:00	South Africa	88–25	Northern Ireland	Westpac Arena Court 1, Christchurch
23 September; 14:00	Scoring by quarter: 21–4, 26–5, 19–8, 22–8			Westpac Arena Court 1, Christchurch

23 September; 15:45	New Zealand	73–27	Wales	Westpac Arena Court 1, Christchurch
23 September; 15:45	Scoring by quarter: 14–7, 24–5, 20–4, 15–11			Westpac Arena Court 1, Christchurch

24 September; 10:30	Trinidad and Tobago	64–40	Northern Ireland	Westpac Arena Court 1, Christchurch
24 September; 10:30	Scoring by quarter: 15–11, 18–17, 14–2, 17–10			Westpac Arena Court 1, Christchurch

24 September; 15:45	South Africa	70–28	Barbados	Westpac Arena Court 1, Christchurch
24 September; 15:45	Scoring by quarter: 17–8, 15–4, 20–8, 18–8			Westpac Arena Court 1, Christchurch

24 September; 17:30	Cook Islands	51–32	Wales	Westpac Arena Court 1, Christchurch
24 September; 17:30	Scoring by quarter: 12–7, 13–9, 15–6, 11–10			Westpac Arena Court 1, Christchurch

25 September; 8:45	Canada	49–34	Northern Ireland	Westpac Arena Court 1, Christchurch
25 September; 8:45	Scoring by quarter: 14–13, 13–8, 11–8, 11–5			Westpac Arena Court 1, Christchurch

25 September; 10:30	Barbados	52–34	Wales	Westpac Arena Court 1, Christchurch
25 September; 10:30	Scoring by quarter: 11–12, 16–5, 17–7, 8–10			Westpac Arena Court 1, Christchurch

25 September; 15:45	New Zealand	74–43	Cook Islands	Westpac Arena Court 1, Christchurch
25 September; 15:45	Scoring by quarter: 20–9, 15–14, 16–9, 23–11			Westpac Arena Court 1, Christchurch

25 September; 19:15	South Africa	85–30	Trinidad and Tobago	Westpac Arena Court 1, Christchurch
25 September; 19:15	Scoring by quarter: 20–6, 26–11, 19–7, 20–6			Westpac Arena Court 1, Christchurch

26 September; 8:45	Wales	67–39	Northern Ireland	Westpac Arena Court 1, Christchurch
26 September; 8:45	Scoring by quarter: 15–12, 21–5, 15–12, 16–10			Westpac Arena Court 1, Christchurch

26 September; 10:30	Barbados	72–32	Canada	Westpac Arena Court 1, Christchurch
26 September; 10:30	Scoring by quarter: 16–6, 16–10, 14–11, 26–5			Westpac Arena Court 1, Christchurch

26 September; 14:00	Cook Islands	65–52	Trinidad and Tobago	Westpac Arena Court 1, Christchurch

26 September; 19:15	New Zealand	68–39	South Africa	Westpac Arena Court 1, Christchurch
26 September; 19:15	Scoring by quarter: 17–7, 14–11, 19–11, 18–10			Westpac Arena Court 1, Christchurch
26 September; 19:15	Donna Loffhagen 40/52 (77%); Belinda Colling 28/37 (76%)		Irene van Dyk 24/25 (96%); Rosina Mogola 8/10 (80%); Rusky Mthethwa 7/10 (70%)	Westpac Arena Court 1, Christchurch

27 September; 8:45	Cook Islands	64–39	Canada	Westpac Arena Court 1, Christchurch
27 September; 8:45	Scoring by quarter: 18–10, 14–10, 9–11, 23–8			Westpac Arena Court 1, Christchurch

27 September; 12:15	Trinidad and Tobago	47–46	Barbados	Westpac Arena Court 1, Christchurch
27 September; 12:15	Scoring by quarter: 12–11, 9–14, 14–12, 12–9			Westpac Arena Court 1, Christchurch

27 September; 15:45	New Zealand	92–26	Northern Ireland	Westpac Arena Court 1, Christchurch
27 September; 15:45	Scoring by quarter: 21–9, 23–8, 23–6, 25–3			Westpac Arena Court 1, Christchurch

27 September; 19:30	South Africa	80–31	Wales	Westpac Arena Court 1, Christchurch
27 September; 19:30	Scoring by quarter: 21–6, 18–8, 21–8, 20–9			Westpac Arena Court 1, Christchurch

28 September; 8:45	Cook Islands	91–32	Northern Ireland	Westpac Arena Court 1, Christchurch
28 September; 8:45	Scoring by quarter: 21–10, 20–13, 24–6, 26–3			Westpac Arena Court 1, Christchurch

28 September; 12:15	Trinidad and Tobago	70–33	Wales	Westpac Arena Court 1, Christchurch
28 September; 12:15	Scoring by quarter: 16–12, 22–8, 17–5, 15–8			Westpac Arena Court 1, Christchurch

28 September; 15:45	New Zealand	71–35	Barbados	Westpac Arena Court 1, Christchurch
28 September; 15:45	Scoring by quarter: 21–6, 17–6, 18–11, 15–12			Westpac Arena Court 1, Christchurch

28 September; 17:30	South Africa	84–26	Canada	Westpac Arena Court 1, Christchurch
28 September; 17:30	Scoring by quarter: 19–6, 28–7, 20–8, 17–5			Westpac Arena Court 1, Christchurch

29 September; 10:30	Barbados	51–26	Northern Ireland	Westpac Arena Court 1, Christchurch
29 September; 10:30	Scoring by quarter: 11–7, 13–5, 16–5, 11–9			Westpac Arena Court 1, Christchurch

29 September; 12:45	Canada	48–43	Wales	Westpac Arena Court 1, Christchurch
29 September; 12:45	Scoring by quarter: 14–14, 17–8, 8–10, 9–11			Westpac Arena Court 1, Christchurch

29 September; 15:45	South Africa	68–46	Cook Islands	Westpac Arena Court 1, Christchurch
29 September; 15:45	Scoring by quarter: 12–9, 21–17, 17–9, 18–11			Westpac Arena Court 1, Christchurch

29 September; 19:30	New Zealand	74–41	Trinidad and Tobago	Westpac Arena Court 1, Christchurch
29 September; 19:30	Scoring by quarter: 17–11, 19–9, 22–10, 16–11			Westpac Arena Court 1, Christchurch

== Classification matches ==
=== Quarter-finals ===
30 September; 8:45	Malawi	55–38	Canada	Westpac Arena Court 1, Christchurch
30 September; 8:45	Scoring by quarter: 15–8, 9–13, 20–7, 11–10			Westpac Arena Court 1, Christchurch

30 September; 10:30	Samoa	75–38	Northern Ireland	Westpac Arena Court 1, Christchurch
30 September; 10:30	Scoring by quarter: 13–12, 24–10, 19–9, 19–7			Westpac Arena Court 1, Christchurch

30 September; 12:15	Barbados	74–47	United States	Westpac Arena Court 1, Christchurch

30 September; 14:00	Singapore	63–49	Wales	Westpac Arena Court 1, Christchurch
30 September; 14:00	Scoring by quarter: 16–13, 17–13, 12–13, 18–10			Westpac Arena Court 1, Christchurch

=== Semi-finals ===
1 October; 8:45	Canada	50–39	Northern Ireland	Westpac Arena Court 1, Christchurch

1 October; 10:30	Samoa	70–59	Malawi	Westpac Arena Court 1, Christchurch

1 October; 12:15	Wales	57–54	United States	Westpac Arena Court 1, Christchurch
1 October; 12:15	Scoring by quarter: 14–12, 15–13, 12–16, 16–13			Westpac Arena Court 1, Christchurch

1 October; 14:00	Barbados	62–53	Singapore	Westpac Arena Court 1, Christchurch

=== Playoff 9-16 ===
2 October; 8:00	United States	62–39	Northern Ireland	Westpac Arena Court 1, Christchurch
2 October; 8:00	Scoring by quarter: 13–12, 16–10, 19–8, 14–9			Westpac Arena Court 1, Christchurch

2 October; 9:45	Canada	58–57	Wales	Westpac Arena Court 1, Christchurch
2 October; 9:45	Scoring by quarter: 14–13, 15–13, 13–15, 16–16			Westpac Arena Court 1, Christchurch

2 October; 11:30	Malawi	62–52	Singapore	Westpac Arena Court 1, Christchurch

2 October; 13:15	Samoa	67–42	Barbados	Westpac Arena Court 1, Christchurch
2 October; 13:15	Scoring by quarter: 17–14, 18–9, 18–11, 14–8			Westpac Arena Court 1, Christchurch

== Finals ==
Quarter-finals
30 September
Australia	87
Trinidad and Tobago	34
30 September
England	44
South Africa	42
30 September
Jamaica	76
Cook Islands	46
30 September
New Zealand	81
Fiji	38

Semi-finals
1 October
Australia	54
England	44
1 October
Jamaica	53
New Zealand	55

Final
2 October
Australia	42
New Zealand	41
Bronze Medal Match
2 October
England	57
Jamaica	43

=== Quarter-finals ===
30 September; 15:45	Jamaica	76–46	Cook Islands	Westpac Arena Court 1, Christchurch
30 September; 15:45	Scoring by quarter: 21–8, 19–11, 19–10, 17–17			Westpac Arena Court 1, Christchurch
30 September; 15:45	Elaine Davis 48/51 (94%); Connie Francis 28/37 (76%)		Angela Matapo 23/25 (92%); Elizabeth Dean 14/19 (74%); Melissa Fotu 9/13 (69%)	Westpac Arena Court 1, Christchurch

30 September; 17:30	Australia	87–34	Trinidad and Tobago	Westpac Arena Court 1, Christchurch

30 September; 19:15	England	44–42	South Africa	Westpac Arena Court 1, Christchurch
30 September; 19:15	Scoring by quarter: 10–13, 13–7, 9–15, 12–7			Westpac Arena Court 1, Christchurch
30 September; 19:15	Alex Astle 32/40 (80%); Tracey Neville 8/22 (36%); Lyn Carpenter 4/7 (57%)		Irene van Dyk 24/26 (92%); Rosina Mogola 18/23 (78%)	Westpac Arena Court 1, Christchurch

30 September; 21:00	New Zealand	81–38	Fiji	Westpac Arena Court 1, Christchurch
30 September; 21:00	Scoring by quarter: 20–9, 22–8, 22–7, 17–14			Westpac Arena Court 1, Christchurch
30 September; 21:00	Belinda Colling 37/47 (79%); Donna Loffhagen 34/41 (83%); Teresa Tairi 10/13 (77%)		Vaciti Vocea 24/34 (71%); Paulini Tora 7/13 (54%); Alanitta Evans 5/7 (71%); Lanieta Tuisese 2/2 (100%)	Westpac Arena Court 1, Christchurch

=== Semi-finals (5-8) ===
1 October; 15:45	South Africa	75–47	Trinidad and Tobago	Westpac Arena Court 1, Christchurch
1 October; 15:45	Scoring by quarter: 20–10, 22–10, 17–13, 16–14			Westpac Arena Court 1, Christchurch
1 October; 15:45	Irene van Dyk 50/51 (98%); Rosina Mogola 19/24 (79%); Manzo Machoga 6/10 (60%)		Janelle Barker 28/37 (76%); Simone Morgan 19/29 (66%)	Westpac Arena Court 1, Christchurch

1 October; 19:15	Fiji	55–42	Cook Islands	Westpac Arena Court 1, Christchurch
1 October; 19:15	Scoring by quarter: 10–10, 17–14, 15–9, 13–9			Westpac Arena Court 1, Christchurch
1 October; 19:15	Alanitta Evans 33/39 (85%); Lanieta Tuisese 18/23 (78%); Vaciti Vocea 4/8 (50%)		Angela Matapo 27/29 (93%); Melissa Fotu 13/24 (54%); Elizabeth Dean 2/3 (67%)	Westpac Arena Court 1, Christchurch

=== Semi-finals ===
1 October; 17:30	Australia	54–44	England	Westpac Arena Court 1, Christchurch
1 October; 17:30	Scoring by quarter: 20–10, 12–9, 13–12, 9–13			Westpac Arena Court 1, Christchurch
1 October; 17:30	Vicki Wilson 30/38 (79%); Jacqui Delaney 20/33 (61%); Sharelle McMahon 4/6 (67%)		Alex Astle 32/39 (82%); Lyn Carpenter 7/9 (78%); Tracey Neville 5/7 (71%)	Westpac Arena Court 1, Christchurch

1 October; 21:00	New Zealand	55–53	Jamaica	Westpac Arena Court 1, Christchurch
1 October; 21:00	Scoring by quarter: 13–16, 15–9, 12–14, 15–14			Westpac Arena Court 1, Christchurch
1 October; 21:00	Donna Loffhagen 44/51 (86%); Belinda Colling 11/18 (61%)		Elaine Davis 40/43 (93%); Connie Francis 13/18 (72%)	Westpac Arena Court 1, Christchurch

=== 7th place match ===
2 October; 15:00	Cook Islands	64–54	Trinidad and Tobago	Westpac Arena Court 1, Christchurch
2 October; 15:00	Scoring by quarter: 20–16, 15–15, 13–11, 16–12			Westpac Arena Court 1, Christchurch
2 October; 15:00	Angela Matapo 44/47 (94%); Melissa Fotu 10/19 (53%); John Ngatokoa 10/14 (71%)		Janelle Barker 43/49 (88%); Simone Morgan 11/21 (52%)	Westpac Arena Court 1, Christchurch

=== 5th place match ===
2 October; 16:45	South Africa	57–49	Fiji	Westpac Arena Court 1, Christchurch
2 October; 16:45	Scoring by quarter: 15–8, 10–12, 15–15, 17–14			Westpac Arena Court 1, Christchurch
2 October; 16:45	Irene van Dyk 38/39 (97%); Rosina Mogola 13/18 (72%); Rusky Mthethwa 6/6 (100%)		Paulini Tora 25/32 (78%); Alanitta Evans 24/28 (86%)	Westpac Arena Court 1, Christchurch

=== Bronze medal match ===
2 October; 18:30	England	57–43	Jamaica	Westpac Arena Court 1, Christchurch
2 October; 18:30	Scoring by quarter: 12–15, 12–12, 20–10, 13–6			Westpac Arena Court 1, Christchurch
2 October; 18:30	Alex Astle 38/48 (79%); Tracey Neville 19/30 (63%)		Elaine Davis 22/26 (85%); Connie Francis 21/25 (84%)	Westpac Arena Court 1, Christchurch

=== Gold medal match ===
2 October; 20:30	Australia	42–41	New Zealand	Westpac Arena Court 1, Christchurch
2 October; 20:30	Scoring by quarter: 13–13, 8–10, 7–11, 14–7			Westpac Arena Court 1, Christchurch
2 October; 20:30	Vicki Wilson 15/26 (58%); Jacqui Delaney 12/18 (67%); Jennifer Borlase 9/13 (69%); Sharelle McMahon 6/8 (75%)		Donna Loffhagen 30/42 (71%); Belinda Colling 11/20 (55%)	Westpac Arena Court 1, Christchurch

== Final placings ==
Place	Nation
Gold	Australia
Silver	New Zealand
Bronze	England
4	Jamaica
5	South Africa
6	Fiji
7	Cook Islands
8	Trinidad and Tobago
9	Samoa
10	Barbados
11	Malawi
12	Singapore
13	Canada
14	Wales
15	United States
16	Northern Ireland
17	Zambia
18	Papua New Guinea
19	Malaysia
20	Scotland
21	Sri Lanka
22	Tonga
23	Cayman Islands
24	Hong Kong
25	Niue
26	Vanuatu

=== Medallists ===
Gold	Silver	Bronze
Australia; Coach: Jill McIntosh	New Zealand; Coach: Yvonne Willering	England; Coach: Mary Beardwood
Vicki Wilson (c); Jenny Borlase; Carissa Dalwood; Jacqui Delaney; Liz Ellis; Sharon Finnan; Kathryn Harby; Janine Ilitch; Sharelle McMahon; Shelley O'Donnell; Rebecca Sanders; Peta Squire	Belinda Colling (c); Donna Loffhagen; Adine Harper; Teresa Tairi; Anna Rowberry; Sonya Hardcastle; Julie Seymour; Lesley Nicol; Belinda Charteris; Lorna Suafoa; Linda Vagana; Bernice Mene	Joanne Zinzan (c); Amanda Newton; Olivia Murphy; Tracey Neville (vc); Alex Astle; Karen Aspinall; Naomi Siddall; Sonia Mkoloma; Hellen Manufor; Helen Lonsdale; Lyn Carpenter; Lisa Stanley
