= Netball at the 1993 South Pacific Mini Games =

- Location: Port Vila - Vanuatu
- Dates: 7–12 December 1993
- Teams: 9

Medalists
gold medal	Cook Islands
silver medal	Papua New Guinea
bronze medal	Fiji

Netball at the 1993 South Pacific Mini Games in Port Vila, Vanuatu was held from 7–12 December 1993.

== Preliminary round ==
=== Pool A ===
	P	W	L	Pts	F	A	F/A
Fiji	4	4	0	8	240	112	+128
Samoa	4	3	1	6	226	142	+84
Solomon Islands	4	2	2	4	172	209	−37
Vanuatu	4	1	3	2	147	207	−60
Norfolk Island	4	0	4	0	105	220	−115

Qualified for the semifinals

7 December 1993	Solomon Islands	52 – 39	Vanuatu	Port Vila, Vanuatu

Fiji	42 – 41	Samoa	Port Vila, Vanuatu

8 December 1993	Samoa	59 – 24	Norfolk Island	Port Vila, Vanuatu

Solomon Islands	30 – 65	Fiji	Port Vila, Vanuatu

9 December 1993	Samoa	55 – 35	Vanuatu	Port Vila, Vanuatu

Fiji	63 – 17	Norfolk Island	Port Vila, Vanuatu

10 December 1993	Norfolk Island	34 – 49	Solomon Islands	Port Vila, Vanuatu

Fiji	70 – 24	Vanuatu	Port Vila, Vanuatu

11 December 1993	Samoa	71 – 41	Solomon Islands	Port Vila, Vanuatu

Vanuatu	49 – 30	Norfolk Island	Port Vila, Vanuatu

=== Pool B ===
	P	W	L	Pts	F	A	F/A
Cook Islands	3	3	0	6	252	97	+155
Papua New Guinea	3	2	1	4	202	134	+68
Tonga	3	1	2	2	132	143	−11
American Samoa	3	0	3	0	57	270	−213

Qualified for the semifinals

8 December 1993	Cook Islands	109 – 13	American Samoa	Port Vila, Vanuatu

Papua New Guinea	55 – 34	Tonga	Port Vila, Vanuatu

9 December 1993	Cook Islands	71 – 49	Papua New Guinea	Port Vila, Vanuatu

American Samoa	16 – 63	Tonga	Port Vila, Vanuatu

11 December 1993	American Samoa	28 – 98	Papua New Guinea	Port Vila, Vanuatu

Cook Islands	72 – 35	Tonga	Port Vila, Vanuatu

== Consolation matches ==
13 December 1993	Tonga	54 – 40	Vanuatu	Port Vila, Vanuatu

American Samoa	29 – 48	Norfolk Island	Port Vila, Vanuatu

=== 7th/8th match ===
14 December 1993	Vanuatu	44 – 34	Norfolk Island	Port Vila, Vanuatu

=== 5th/6th match ===
14 December 1993	Tonga	68 – 55	Solomon Islands	Port Vila, Vanuatu

== Semi-finals ==
13 December 1993	Fiji	48 – 52	Papua New Guinea	Port Vila, Vanuatu

Cook Islands	68 – 34	Samoa	Port Vila, Vanuatu

== Third place match ==
14 December 1993	Fiji	61 – 44	Samoa	Port Vila, Vanuatu

== Final ==
14 December 1993	Cook Islands	63 – 52	Papua New Guinea	Port Vila, Vanuatu

== Final standings ==
Place	Nation
Gold	Cook Islands
Silver	Papua New Guinea
Bronze	Fiji
4	Samoa
5	Tonga
6	Solomon Islands
7	Vanuatu
8	Norfolk Island
9	American Samoa

== See also ==
- Netball at the Pacific Mini Games
