= Netball at the 1991 South Pacific Games =

- Location: Port Moresby, Papua New Guinea
- Dates: 7–21 September 1991

Medalists
gold medal	Cook Islands
silver medal	Papua New Guinea
bronze medal	Tonga

Netball at the 1991 South Pacific Games in Port Moresby, Papua New Guinea was held from 7–21 September 1991.

This was the sixth competition at the South Pacific Games for netball after missing the 1987 South Pacific Games. The winner of the event were the Cook Islands over the Papua New Guinea. Tonga took home the bronze.

== Final standings ==
Place	Nation
Gold	Cook Islands
Silver	Papua New Guinea
Bronze	Tonga

== See also ==
- Netball at the Pacific Games
