= Netball at the 1995 South Pacific Games =

- Location: Papeete, Tahiti
- Dates: 25 August to 5 September 1995

Medalists
gold medal	Fiji
silver medal	Papua New Guinea
bronze medal	Tonga

Netball at the 1991 South Pacific Games in Santa Rita, Guam was held from 25 August to 5 September 1995.

This was the seventh competition at the South Pacific Games for netball. The winner of the event were the Fiji over the Papua New Guinea. Tonga took the bronze.

== Final standings ==
Place	Nation
Gold	Fiji
Silver	Papua New Guinea
Bronze	Tonga

== See also ==
- Netball at the Pacific Games
