= Papua New Guinea national netball team =

Papua New Guinea
- Nickname(s): The Pepes
- Association: Papua New Guinea Netball Federation
- Confederation: Oceania Netball Federation
- Head coach: Margaret R Opina
- World ranking: 31 ▼
Team colours

Netball World Cup
- Appearances: 3 (Debuted in 1991)
- Best result: 14th (1991)

Commonwealth Games
- Appearances: 1 (Debuted in 2010)
- 2018 placing: 11

Papua New Guinea national netball team
Medal record

Pacific Games
Gold medal – first place	1969 Port Moresby	Team
Silver medal – second place	1991 Port Moresby	Team
Silver medal – second place	1995 Papeete	Team
Silver medal – second place	1999 Santa Rita	Team
Silver medal – second place	2003 Suva	Team
Silver medal – second place	2015 Port Moresby	Team
Bronze medal – third place	1963 Suva	Team
Bronze medal – third place	1966 Nouméa	Team
Bronze medal – third place	1979 Suva	Team
Bronze medal – third place	2007 Apia	Team

The Papua New Guinea national netball team represent Papua New Guinea in international netball competition. They are nicknamed the "Pepes", which comes from the Keapara word for "butterfly". Papua New Guinea played in the 2010 Commonwealth Games, finishing 11th. As of 2 December 2019, the Pepes are 31st in the INF World Rankings.

== Players ==
As of July 2011.

2011 PNG Pepes team
Players	Debut (caps)	Positions	Date of birth	Height	Club
Lua Rikis (cc)	1988 (61)	GS, GA, GK, GD	31 January 1982 (age 44)	1.78 m (5 ft 10 in)	City Pharmacy Rebels
Winnie Mavara (cc)	1999 (63)	WD, GD, GK, WA, C	22 June 1978 (age 48)	1.70 m (5 ft 7 in)	City Pharmacy Rebels
Maleta Roberts (vc)	2006 (33)	GA, GS, WA	25 April 1985 (age 41)	1.76 m (5 ft 9 1/2 in)	Suncoast Lynx
Richanda Kassman	2008 (21)	WA, C	31 July 1985 (age 41)	1.61 m (5 ft 3 1/2 in)	South Brisbane Strikers
Nisha Omi	2008 (25)	GK, GD, WD	13 September 1990 (age 36)	1.75 m (5 ft 9 in)	Madang
Alurigo Opina	2007 (23)	WA, C	29 July 1989 (age 37)	1.69 m (5 ft 6 1/2 in)	PoMNA Sparrows
Marie Ottio	2009 (13)	GA, GS, GK, GD	8 April 1989 (age 37)	1.71 m (5 ft 7 1/2 in)	Monier Paramana
Cheryl Renagi	2010 (13)	C, WA	8 July 1990 (age 36)	1.61 m (5 ft 3 1/2 in)	Lismore A
Lama Lua	N/A (-)	GK, GD, WD	20 February 1992 (age 34)	1.69 m (5 ft 6 1/2 in)	Esco Telstars
Marypaul Buehler	2011 (-)	GS, GA	28 November 1992 (age 33)	1.74 m (5 ft 8 1/2 in)	Snax Mermaids
Nancy Kapi	2011 (-)	GK, GD, WD	(age 21)	1.73 m (5 ft 8 in)	Snax Mermaids
Jessie Logo	2011 (-)	GK, GD	3 February 1988 (age 38)	1.78 m (5 ft 10 in)	Monier Paramana

== Competitive record ==
As of 4 October 2010.

Netball World Cup
Year	Championship	Location	Placing
1991	8th World Championships	Sydney	14th
1995	9th World Championships	Birmingham, England	15th
1999	10th World Championships	Christchurch, New Zealand	18th

Netball at the Commonwealth Games
Year	Games	Event	Location	Placing
2010	XIX Games	4th Netball	Delhi, India	11th

Arafura Games
Years	Placing
1995	(silver) 2nd
1997	(silver) 2nd
2001	(silver) 2nd
2007	(gold) 1st

(South) Pacific Games
Years	Placing
1963	(bronze) 3rd
1966	(bronze) 3rd
1969	(gold) 1st
1979	(bronze) 3rd
1991	(silver) 2nd
1995	(silver) 2nd
1999	(silver) 2nd
2003	(silver) 2nd
2007	(bronze) 3rd
2015	(silver) 2nd
2019	(bronze) 3rd
2023	4th

(South) Pacific Mini Games
Years	Placing
1981	(silver) 2nd
1985	(silver) 2nd
1989	(silver) 2nd
1993	(silver) 2nd
1997	(bronze) 3rd
2001	(silver) 2nd
2009	(silver) 2nd
2017	(gold) 1st

Pacific Netball Series
Years	Placing
2009	(bronze) 3rd
2010	4th
2011	4th
2012	?
2013	(silver) 2nd
2014	(bronze) 3rd

Nations Cup
Years	Placing
2006	(silver) 2nd
2008	(gold) 1st
2011	6th
2013	(bronze) 3rd
2014	5th
2015	(silver) 2nd
2016	(silver) 2nd
2019	5th
2023	(silver) 2nd
2025	(bronze) 3rd
