= Cook Islands national netball team =

Cook Islands
- Association: Cook Islands Netball Association
- Confederation: Oceania Netball Federation
- Head coach: Anna Andrews-Tasola
- Asst coach: Sebon Will
- Manager: Joy Bates
- World ranking: 14 ▼
Team colours

Netball World Cup
- Appearances: 6 (Debuted in 1987)
- Best result: 5th (1991)

Commonwealth Games
- Appearances: 2 (Debuted in 1998)
- Best result: 6th (1998)

The Cook Islands national netball team represent the Cook Islands in international netball. In recent years they have finished 1st at the 2019 Pacific Games, 1st at the 2018 Nations Cup in Singapore, 10th at the 2010 Commonwealth Games and 7th at the 2007 World Netball Championships; the Cook Islands did not qualify for the 2011 World Championships in Singapore.

Although the national team appeared in six consecutive Netball World Cups between 1987 and 2007, they have not appeared in any since then. However, their youth team has appeared in the Netball World Youth Cups with their best finish, 3rd place in 1992.

The Cook Islands team were ranked as high as 10th in the INF World Rankings at one stage.As of June 2026, the Cook Islands do not have a ranking in the top 47 netball nations.

== Team ==
12-member squad for the Pacific Netball Series Tournament in Fiji, June 27–29, 2012.

Cook Islands national netball team
Players	Coaching staff
Alex Iro; Ashleigh Iro; Rochelle Teiri; Elena Mataora; Maeva Carr; Luciana Nicholas; Eri Short; Natalia Short; Anania Piri; Alanna Smith; Lenae Tiaiti; Marjorie Toru	Head coach: Anna Andrews-Tasola

== Competitive history ==
Netball World Cup
Year	Championship	Location	Placing
1987	7th World Championships	Glasgow, Scotland	6th
1991	8th World Championships	Sydney, Australia	5th
1995	9th World Championships	Birmingham, England	7th
1999	10th World Championships	Christchurch, New Zealand	7th
2003	11th World Championships	Kingston, Jamaica	11th
2007	12th World Championships	Auckland, New Zealand	7th

Netball at the Commonwealth Games
Year	Games	Event	Location	Placing
1998	XVI Games	1st Netball	Kuala Lumpur, Malaysia	6th
2010	XIX Games	4th Netball	Delhi, India	10th

Pacific Games
Year	Games	Event	Location	Placing
1966	II Games	Netball	Nouméa, New Caledonia	1st
1979	VI Games	Netball	Suva, Fiji	2nd
1983	VII Games	Netball	Apia, Samoa	2nd
1991	IX Games	Netball	Port Moresby, Papua New Guinea	1st
1995	X Games	Netball	Papeete, Tahiti	4th
1999	XI Games	Netball	Santa Rita, Guam	4th
2003	XII Games	Netball	Suva, Fiji	3rd
2007	XIII Games	Netball	Apia, Samoa	4th
2015	XV Games	Netball	Port Moresby, Papua New Guinea	4th
2019	XVI Games	Netball	Apia, Samoa	1st
2023	XVII Games	Netball	Honiara, Solomon Islands	5th

Pacific Mini Games
Year	Games	Event	Location	Placing
1981	I Games	Netball	Honiara, Solomon Islands	1st
1985	II Games	Netball	Rarotonga, Cook Islands	1st
1989	III Games	Netball	Nukuʻalofa, Tonga	1st
1993	IV Games	Netball	Port Vila, Vanuatu	1st
1997	V Games	Netball	Pago Pago, American Samoa	1st
2001	VI Games	Netball	Kingston, Norfolk Island	3rd
2009	VIII Games	Netball	Rarotonga, Cook Islands	3rd

== See also ==
- Netball in the Cook Islands
