= Tonga national netball team =

Tonga
- Nickname(s): Tonga Tala
- Association: Tonga Netball Association
- Confederation: Oceania Netball Federation
- World ranking: 8
Team colours

Netball World Cup
- Appearances: 2
- 2015 placing: 8th
- Best result: 8th (2023)

The Tonga national netball team (Tongan: timi netipolo fakafonua ʻa Tonga) represents Tonga in international women's netball. Although netball has been played in Tonga, they joined the International Netball Federation in 2011. Tonga won bronze at the South Pacific Games in 1983, 1991 and 1995. On 21 July 2019, Tonga Re-entered at nineteenth in the INF World Rankings.

In June 2022 the team was renamed the Tonga Tala.

They were undefeated at the 2023 Oceania Netball World Cup Qualifiers, and qualified for the 2023 Netball World Cup. Following the qualifiers they were ranked 9th in the world. In March 2023 they rose to 7th ranked following the PacificAus Series.

== Current squad ==
Tongan netball team for the 2023 Netball World Cup:

Tonga roster
Players
Coaches

Name	Pos	DOB	Height	Club	Nat	Caps
Luana Aukafolau			–
Lose Fainga’anuku			–
Lucia Fau’onuku			–	City West Falcons
Mo'onia Gerrard		15 November 1980	1.80 m (5 ft 11 in)		(Australia)
Marie Hansen			–
Kelela Iongi			–
Jessyka Ngauamo		3 December 1995	–
Beyonce Palavi	GA		–	City West Falcons
Uneeq Palavi	GS		–	City West Falcons	(Australia)
Silia Setefano			–
Peti Talanoa			–
Salote Taufa			–	Central Manawa	(New Zealand)
Valu Toutaiolepo			–
Cathrine Tuivaiti		25 October 1986	1.89 m (6 ft 2 in)	Gold Coast Titans	(Australia)
Hulita Veve		14 September 1995	1.78 m (5 ft 10 in)		(Australia)

Head coach

- Jaqua Pori-Makea-Simpson

Notes

- (c) – Captain
- (cc) – Co-captain
- (vc) – Vice-captain
- – Injury / maternity leave
- (TRP) – Temporary Replacement Player
Player profiles: [ Team website]
Last updated: 20 June 2023

== Competitive history ==
Netball World Cup
Year	Championship	Location	Placing
1999	10th World Championships	Christchurch, New Zealand	22nd
2023	16th World Cup	Cape Town, South Africa	8th

Pacific Games
Year	Games	Event	Location	Placing
1983	VII Games	Netball	Apia, Samoa	3rd
1991	IX Games	Netball	Port Moresby, Papua New Guinea	3rd
1995	X Games	Netball	Papeete, Tahiti	3rd
2003	XII Games	Netball	Suva, Fiji	5th
2015	XV Games	Netball	Port Moresby, Papua New Guinea	5th
2019	XVI Games	Netball	Apia, Samoa	2nd
2023	XVII Games	Netball	Honiara, Solomon Islands	1st

Pacific Mini Games
Year	Games	Event	Location	Placing
1985	II Games	Netball	Rarotonga, Cook Islands	3rd
1993	IV Games	Netball	Port Vila, Vanuatu	4th
2009	VIII Games	Netball	Rarotonga, Cook Islands	5th
2017	X Games	Netball	Port Vila, Vanuatu	2nd

== See also ==
- Netball in Tonga
