= Fiji national netball team =

Fiji
- Nickname(s): Fijian Pearls
- Association: Netball Fiji
- Confederation: Oceania Netball Federation
- Head coach: Unaisi Rakoura
- Captain: Alisi Naqiri
- World ranking: 16
Team colours

Netball World Cup
- Appearances: 10
- 2023 placing: 11th
- Best result: 6th (1999)

Commonwealth Games
- Appearances: 3
- 2018 placing: 12th
- Best result: 7th (2002)

The Fiji National Netball Team better known at the Fiji Pearls represents Fiji in international netball competition. Fiji have competed at nine World Netball Championships, finishing sixth in their best placing at the 1999 tournament. They have also competed at two Commonwealth Games, and won the netball event at the South Pacific Games for a number of years. They have won gold at every games since 1991. They are also the current Pacific Champions, winning the all Pacific Series since its inception.

As of 21 July 2019, the Fijian team are Seventeenth in the INF World Rankings. They were captained by Matila Waqanidrola, and coached by Gabriel Qoro and Unaisi Rokoura.

The Fiji National Netball Team are now known as the Fijian Pearls after securing their sponsorship in May 2013 with The Pearl South Pacific Resort. The Fijian Pearls are currently under the coaching guidance of Unaisi Rokoura and new team manager, Lusiani Rokoura. The Fiji Pearls hosted 5th ranked Malawi to a 2-test match in Suva on 2 and 4 November 2013.

== The Team ==
=== 2022 Netball Singapore Nations Cup ===
Netball Singapore Nations Cup.

Fiji roster
Players
Coaches

Name	Pos	DOB	Height	Club	Nat	Caps
Vaiti Waqatabu (C)			–
Unaisi Rauluni		18 September 1994	–
Matila Vocea		18 June 2000	–
Lydia Panapasa		14 September 2000	–
Jimaima Kete			–
Elina Drikibau			–
Ledua Waqa			–
Alisi Galo			–
Navinya Sivo			–
Merelita Waqanidrola			–
Reama Verekauta			–
Sereana Maragi			–

Head coach

- Vacant

Notes

- (c) – Captain
- (cc) – Co-captain
- (vc) – Vice-captain
- – Injury / maternity leave
- (TRP) – Temporary Replacement Player
Player profiles: [ Team website]
Last updated: 30 November 2022

=== 2023 Netball World Cup Team ===
Maria Lutua Rusivakula

Adi Bolakoro Vakaoca

Kelera Nawai-Caucau

Jimaima Kete

Ana Cagi Moi

Elina Drikibau

Anaseini Nauqe

Kalesi Tawake

Josephine Tubua

Lydia Panapasa

Reserves

Naviniya Sivo

Reama Verekauta

Avelina Navue

=== Notable Past Players ===
- Vilimaina Davu
- Matila Waqanidrola
- Afa Rusivakula

== Competitive history ==
Netball World Cup
Year	Championship	Location	Placing
1975	4th World Championships	Auckland, New Zealand	8th
1987	7th World Championships	Glasgow, Scotland	8th
1991	8th World Championships	Sydney, Australia	11th
1999	10th World Championships	Christchurch, New Zealand	6th
2003	11th World Championships	Kingston, Jamaica	8th
2007	12th World Championships	Auckland, New Zealand	9th
2011	13th World Championships	Singapore	10th
2015	14th World Cup	Sydney, Australia	11th
2019	15th World Cup	Liverpool, England	14th
2023	16th World Cup	Cape Town, South Africa	11th

Netball at the Commonwealth Games
Year	Games	Event	Location	Placing
1998	XVI Games	1st Netball	Kuala Lumpur, Malaysia	–
2002	XVII Games	2nd Netball	Manchester, England	7th
2006	XVIII Games	3rd Netball	Melbourne, Australia	9th
2010	XIX Games	4th Netball	Delhi, India	–
2014	XX Games	5th Netball	Glasgow, Scotland	–
2018	XXI Games	6th Netball	Gold Coast, Australia	12th

Pacific Games
Year	Games	Event	Location	Placing
1963	I Games	Basketball 7's	Suva, Fiji	1st
1966	II Games	Netball	Nouméa, New Caledonia	2nd
1979	VI Games	Netball	Suva, Fiji	1st
1983	VII Games	Netball	Apia, Samoa	2nd
1991	IX Games	Netball	Port Moresby, Papua New Guinea	–
1995	X Games	Netball	Papeete, Tahiti	1st
1999	XI Games	Netball	Santa Rita, Guam	1st
2003	XII Games	Netball	Suva, Fiji	1st
2007	XIII Games	Netball	Apia, Samoa	1st
2015	XV Games	Netball	Port Moresby, Papua New Guinea	1st
2019	XVI Games	Netball	Apia, Samoa	–
2023	XVII Games	Netball	Honiara, Solomon Islands	2nd

Pacific Mini Games
Year	Games	Event	Location	Placing
1993	IV Games	Netball	Port Vila, Vanuatu	3rd
1997	V Games	Netball	Pago Pago, American Samoa	2nd
2001	VI Games	Netball	Kingston, Norfolk Island	1st
2009	VIII Games	Netball	Rarotonga, Cook Islands	1st

== See also ==
- Netball in Fiji
