= Samoa national netball team =

Netball team

Samoa
- Association: Netball Samoa
- Confederation: Oceania Netball Federation
- Head coach: Natalie Mathews
- World ranking: 18
Team colours

Netball World Cup
- Appearances: 8 (Debuted in 1991)
- 2019 placing: 13th
- Best result: 6th (2003)

Commonwealth Games
- Appearances: 2 (Debuted in 2006)
- Best result: 5th (2006)

The Samoa national netball team or Tifa Moana represent Samoa in international netball tests and competitions. The team are coached by Natalie Mathews and are captained by Kristiana Manu’a. As of 25 February 2025, Samoa are 18th in the INF World Rankings.

== History ==
They finished 12th at the 2011 World Netball Championships in Singapore, and 9th at the 2010 Commonwealth Games.

On their debut at the Nations Cup (netball) Samoa, captained by Sanita To’o, won the tournament with a final score of 50-41 against Singapore. Samoa participated in the 2009 edition of the Fast5 Netball World Series, placing 6th in the competition.

In 2022 they competed in the 2022 Oceania World Cup Qualifiers, but missed out on qualification.

== Results and fixtures ==
The following is a list of recent and future matches.

Legend

Win Draw Lose Void or postponed Fixture

=== 2022 ===
2023 Netball World Cup qualification – Oceania	Samoa	52-69	Tonga	Suva, Fiji
19 July 2022		Report

2023 Netball World Cup qualification – Oceania	Cook Islands	35-54	Samoa	Suva, Fiji
21 July 2022		Report

2023 Netball World Cup qualification – Oceania	Fiji	45-43	Samoa	Suva, Fiji
22 July 2022

2023 Netball World Cup qualification – Oceania	Samoa	85-32	PNG	Suva, Fiji
23 July 2022

== Players ==
Squad for 2023 Netball World Cup qualifiers

Samoa roster
Players
Coaches

Name	Pos	DOB	Height	Club	Nat	Caps
Eseta Autagavaia (VC)	GA, GS	14/6/1996	1.85 m (6 ft 1 in)	Southern Steel
Jennifer Brown			–	Curtin Hamersley Comets	(Australia)
Seiafi Lafaiali'i	GD, WD	3/12/1994	1.78 m (5 ft 10 in)
Fia Lai Kong			–
Melissa Oloamanu	GK		–	City West Falcons
Ainsleyana Puleiata (C)	WA	23/7/2000	1.70 m (5 ft 7 in)	Central Pulse	(New Zealand)
Hannah Ridling			–	NWBOP Magic
Rebekah Roache			–	Northern Marvels
Soli Ropati	WD	19/5/1997	1.72 m (5 ft 8 in)	City West Falcons	(Australia)
Shenade Southon			–		(Australia)
Larafina Tanielu-Stowers	GS, GK		–	Collegiate Samoa	(Samoa)
Saviour Tui	GA, GS	17/10/2001	1.89 m (6 ft 2 in)	NWBOP Magic	(New Zealand)
Emily Autagavaia (TRP)			–
Geraldine Taefu (TRP)			–	St Mary's	(Samoa)
Samantha Tuilaepa (TRP)			–	Hyundai

Head coach

- Frances Solia

Assistant coach

- Elizabeth Manu

Manager: Eka Arp
Physiotherapist: Holly Boyd
Trainer: St David Forbes

Notes

- (c) – Captain
- (cc) – Co-captain
- (vc) – Vice-captain
- – Injury / maternity leave
- (TRP) – Temporary Replacement Player
Player profiles: [ Team website]
Last updated: 23 July 2022

=== Notable former players ===
- Rita Fatialofa-Paloto
- Cathrine Latu
- Sheryl Scanlan (née Clarke)
- Frances Solia
- Linda Vagana

== Competitive history ==
Netball World Cup
Year	Championship	Location	Placing
1991	8th World Championships	Sydney, Australia	8th
1995	9th World Championships	Birmingham, England	9th
1999	10th World Championships	Christchurch, New Zealand	9th
2003	11th World Championships	Kingston, Jamaica	6th
2007	12th World Championships	Auckland, New Zealand	8th
2011	13th World Championships	Singapore	12th
2015	14th World Cup	Sydney, Australia	10th
2019	15th World Cup	Liverpool, England	13th

Netball at the Commonwealth Games
Year	Games	Event	Location	Placing
2006	XVIII Games	3rd Netball	Melbourne, Australia	5th
2010	XIX Games	4th Netball	Delhi, India	9th
2014	XX Games	5th Netball	Glasgow, Scotland	DNQ
2018	XXIGames	6th Netball	Gold Coast, Australia	DNQ
2022	XXII Games	7th Netball	Birmingham, England	DNQ

Pacific Games
Year	Games	Event	Location	Placing
1963	I Games	Basketball 7's	Suva, Fiji	2nd
2003	XII Games	Netball	Suva, Fiji	4th
2007	XIII Games	Netball	Apia, Samoa	2nd
2015	XV Games	Netball	Port Moresby, Papua New Guinea	3rd
2019	XVI Games	Netball	Apia, Samoa	4th
2023	XVII Games	Netball	Honiara, Solomon Islands	3rd

Pacific Mini Games
Year	Games	Event	Location	Placing
1993	IV Games	Netball	Port Vila, Vanuatu	4th
2001	VI Games	Netball	Kingston, Norfolk Island	4th
2009	VIII Games	Netball	Rarotonga, Cook Islands	3rd
