= Netball at the Commonwealth Games =

International netball competition

- Founded: 1998
- Administrator: World Netball; Commonwealth Games Federation
- Most recent champion: New Zealand (3rd Title)
- Most titles: Australia (4 titles)
- Website: World Netball

Netball at the Commonwealth Games, together with the Netball World Cup, is one of the two major tournaments in international netball. All the major netball playing nations are members of the Commonwealth of Nations.

It was first played in 1990 as a demonstration sport. It has been an official Commonwealth Games sport since 1998. Australia have been the tournament's most successful team, winning four gold medals. New Zealand have won three gold medals. Between 1998 and 2014, Australia and New Zealand contested every final and won every gold and silver medal between them. In 2018, England became only the third team to both reach the final and win the gold medal.

== History ==
=== Tournaments ===
In 1990, Australia defeated New Zealand in a one-off match when netball was a demonstration sport. No medals were awarded. In 1998, Jill McIntosh guided Australia to the inaugural Commonwealth title after they defeated New Zealand 42–39 in the final. In 2002, Australia defended their title, again after defeating New Zealand in the final, this time courtesy of a Sharelle McMahon goal in double extra time.

In 2006 New Zealand won the gold medal for the first time with a 60–55 win over Australia. In 2010, New Zealand, led by Maria Tutaia and Irene van Dyk, won their second gold medal after they defeated Australia 66–64 in an epic encounter. Tutaia scored the winning goal in double extra time after 84 minutes of play. In 2014, Australia won their third Commonwealth title after defeating New Zealand 58–40 in the final. Caitlin Bassett scored 49 from 53 at 92% accuracy to clinch the title.

In 2018, England caused a major surprise when they defeated Australia in the final. Helen Housby scored in the final second to give England a 52–51 victory. As a result England became only the third team to both reach the final and win the gold medal.

Games	Gold	Silver	Bronze
1998	Australia	New Zealand	England
2002	Australia	New Zealand	Jamaica
2006	New Zealand	Australia	England
2010	New Zealand	Australia	England
2014	Australia	New Zealand	Jamaica
2018	England	Australia	Jamaica
2022	Australia	Jamaica	New Zealand
2026	New Zealand	Jamaica	Australia

=== Bronze medal matches ===
Tournament	3rd place, bronze medalist(s)	Score	4th	Venue
1998	England	56–54	South Africa	Bukit Kiara Sports Complex
2002	Jamaica	55–53	England	MEN Arena
2006	England	53–52	Jamaica	Melbourne Multi Purpose Venue
2010	England	70–47	Jamaica	Thyagaraj Sports Complex
2014	Jamaica	52–48	England	SSE Hydro
2018	Jamaica	60–55	New Zealand	Coomera Indoor Sports Centre
2022	New Zealand	55–48	England	National Exhibition Centre
2026	Australia	68-50	England	OVO Hydro

=== Finals ===
Tournament	1st place, gold medalist(s)	Score	2nd place, silver medalist(s)	Venue
1990	Australia ^{(Note 1)}	53–35	New Zealand	Chase Stadium, Auckland
1998	Australia	42–39	New Zealand	Bukit Kiara Sports Complex
2002	Australia	57–55	New Zealand	MEN Arena
2006	New Zealand	60–55	Australia	Melbourne Multi Purpose Venue
2010	New Zealand	66–64	Australia	Thyagaraj Sports Complex
2014	Australia	58–40	New Zealand	SSE Hydro
2018	England	52–51	Australia	Coomera Indoor Sports Centre
2022	Australia	55–51	Jamaica	National Exhibition Centre
2026	New Zealand	56-48	Jamaica	OVO Hydro

=== Overall medal table ===
Rank	Nation	Gold	Silver	Bronze	Total
1	Australia	4	3	1	8
2	New Zealand	3	3	1	7
3	England	1	0	3	4
4	Jamaica	0	2	3	5
Totals (4 entries)		8	8	8	24

== Participating teams ==
Nation	1998	2002	2006	2010	2014	2018	2022	2026	Total
Australia	1	1	2	2	1	2	1	3	8
Barbados	8th	7th	10th	7th	11th	10th	12th	-	7
Canada	9th	8th	-	-	-	-	-	-	2
Cook Islands	6th	-	-	10th	-	-	-	-	2
England	3	4th	3	3	4th	1	4th	4th	8
Fiji	-	9th	9th	-	-	12th	-	-	3
India	-	-	-	12th	-	-	-	-	1
Jamaica	5th	3	4th	4th	3	3	2	2	8
Malawi	7th	-	6th	5th	5th	7th	7th	7th	7
Malaysia	11th	-	-	-	-	-	-	-	1
New Zealand	2	2	1	1	2	4th	3	1	8
Northern Ireland	-	-	-	-	7th	8th	10th	11th	4
Papua New Guinea	-	-	-	11th	-	-	-	-	1
Saint Lucia	-	-	-	-	12th	-	-	-	1
Saint Vincent and the Grenadines	-	-	12th	-	-	-	-	-	1
Samoa	-	-	5th	9th	-	-	-	-	2
Scotland	-	-	-	-	9th	9th	9th	8th	4
Singapore	-	-	11th	-	-	-	-	-	1
South Africa	4th	5th	7th	6th	6th	5th	6th	5th	8
Sri Lanka	12th	10th	-	-	-	-	-	-	2
Tonga	-	-	-	-	-	-	-	9th	1
Trinidad and Tobago	-	-	-	8th	10th	-	11th	12th	4
Uganda	-	-	-	-	-	6th	5th	6th	3
Wales	10th	6th	8th	-	8th	11th	8th	10th	6
Total teams	12	10	12	12	12	12	12	12	

== Notes ==
- ^1 In 1990 no medals were awarded as netball was only a demonstration sport.
