= 1997 South Pacific Mini Games =

- Host city: Pago Pago
- Country: American Samoa
- Nations: 19
- Athletes: 1,798^{*}
- Events: 11 sports
- Opening: August 11, 1997
- Closing: August 22, 1997

The 1997 South Pacific Mini Games were held at Pago Pago in American Samoa from 11 to 22 August 1997. It was the fifth edition of the South Pacific Mini Games. It was much larger than previous editions, with an almost doubling of the number of medals awarded compared to the 1993 South Pacific Mini Games. The impressive performances by Nauru in weightlifting continued in Pago Pago, with the tiny nation finishing on top of the unofficial medal table after winning 33 gold.

The 1997 Games were criticized for poor preparation by local and international journalists, with Matai Akauo in the Pacific Islands Monthly describing them as "the most disoganised ever in the history of the Pacific Islands Council". Without other means transportation, some athletes had to walk to their venues. However, the games went ahead and the events were able to be completed.

== Participating countries ==
Nineteen Pacific nations participated in the Games:^{*}

- American Samoa (247)
- Cook Islands (145)
- Federated States of Micronesia (11)
- Fiji (203)
- French Polynesia (125), "Tahiti"
- Guam (96)
- Kiribati (27)
- Nauru (84)
- New Caledonia (111)
- Niue (33)
- Norfolk Island (9)
- Northern Marianas (28)
- Palau (72)
- Papua New Guinea (177)
- Samoa (195)
- Solomon Islands (76)
- Tonga (99)
- Vanuatu (38)
- Wallis and Futuna (13)
Note: A number in parentheses indicate the size of a country's team.

== Sports ==
The 1997 South Pacific Mini Games hosted eleven sports:

- Athletics (42)
- Boxing (12)
- Basketball (2) ^{a}
- Golf (4) ^{b}
- Netball (1) ^{c}
- Rugby sevens (1)
- Powerlifting (21)
- Sailing (5) ^{d}
- Tennis (7)
- Volleyball (2) ^{e}
- Weightlifting (54) ^{f}
Note: A number in parentheses indicates how many medal events were contested in that sport.

== Final medal table ==
Nauru topped the medal table due to gold medals won in weightlifting. Fiji won the most overall medals:

Rank	Nation	Gold	Silver	Bronze	Total
1	Nauru (NRU)	33	10	12	55
2	Fiji (FIJ)	31	31	28	90
3	American Samoa (ASA)	20	23	7	50
4	Papua New Guinea (PNG)	18	23	17	58
5	Samoa (SAM)	14	9	13	36
6	New Caledonia (NCL)	10	8	4	22
7	French Polynesia (TAH)	7	9	8	24
8	Tonga (TON)	4	4	9	17
9	Solomon Islands (SOL)	2	6	11	19
10	Vanuatu (VAN)	2	4	4	10
11	Guam (GUM)	2	2	2	6
12	Cook Islands (COK)	1	3	4	8
13	Micronesia (FSM)	0	3	0	3
14	Norfolk Island (NFK)	0	1	0	1
15	Niue (NIU)	0	0	0	0
15	Northern Mariana Islands (MNP)	0	0	0	0
15	Palau (PLW)	0	0	0	0
15	Wallis and Futuna (WLF)	0	0	0	0
Totals (18 entries)		144	136	119	399

== See also ==
- Athletics at the 1997 South Pacific Mini Games

== Notes ==
^* The official site provided web pages for each country with the number of athletes in each team:

- American Samoa
- Cook Islands
- FS Micronesia
- Fiji
- Tahiti
- Guam
- Kiribati
- Nauru
- New Caledonia
- Niue
- Niue
- Northern Marianas
- Palau
- Papua New Guinea
- Solomon Islands
- Tonga
- Vanuatu
- Wallis and Futuna
- Samoa

^a Basketball was included in the 1997 Mini Games in lieu of the FIBA Oceania Tournament.

^b Golf: Adi Sai won bronze as a member of the Fijian women's team at the 1979, 1983 and 1987 SPG, and at the 1989, 1993, and 1997 SPMG.

^c Netballers walked to their training venue.

^d Sailing: Dean Hudson was a bronze medalist for American Samoa sailing Hobie 16's at the 1997 South Pacific Mini Games.

^e International Volleyball Federation (FIVB) coach Sue Gozansky coached the Tongan women's and men's teams in preparation for the 1997 Mini Games.

^f The large number of medals awarded for weightlifting (three per weight division) allowed Nauru to top the gold medal count.

== Sources ==
- Final Results August 11–21. 1997: 5th South Pacific Mini Games. Oceania Sport Information Centre (Report). Archived from the original on 23 April 2017.
