= 2001 South Pacific Mini Games =

VI Pacific Mini Games
- Host city: Kingston
- Country: Norfolk Island
- Nations: 18
- Events: 97 in 10 sports
- Opening: 3 December 2001
- Closing: 14 December 2001

The 2001 South Pacific Mini Games, officially known as the VI South Pacific Mini Games, were the sixth edition of the South Pacific Mini Games for nations and territories in the Pacific region that was held in Kingston, Norfolk Island from 3 to 14 December 2001. A total of 18 Pacific Games associations competed in 10 sports and 97 events. It was also the largest international multi-sport event (or sport event as a whole) to be staged in Norfolk Island. The opening and closing ceremonies were held at the Norfolk National Stadium, the main stadium of the event.

It was the first time that the South Pacific Mini Games were held in Norfolk Island. It was also the second time a territory had hosted the games, second after the previous host, American Samoa, in 1997.

All member associations of the Pacific Games Council participated in the event, with the exceptions of Marshall Islands, Tokelau, Tuvalu, and Wallis and Futuna, who didn't send a team.

The final medal tally was led by Fiji with 27 golds and 49 medals overall. French Polynesia was second by both respects, 22 and 45, while New Caledonia finished third with 20 golds and 52 most overall medals. The host nation Norfolk Island achieved its best performance ever at the South Pacific Mini Games, finishing sixth overall by winning 5 golds and 25 total medals.

== Participating countries ==
There were 18 out of the 22 eligible Pacific nations which participated at the Games.

- American Samoa
- Cook Islands
- Fiji
- Kiribati
- Guam
- FS Micronesia
- Nauru
- New Caledonia
- Niue
- Norfolk Island
- Northern Mariana Islands
- Palau
- Papua New Guinea
- Samoa
- Solomon Islands
- Tahiti
- Tonga
- Vanuatu

== Sports ==
Ten sports were contested at the 2001 South Pacific Mini Games:

- Archery (12)
- Athletics (43)
- Bodybuilding (9)
- Golf (4)
- Lawn bowls (8)
- Netball (1)
- Shooting (6)
- Squash (4)
- Tennis (7)
- Triathlon (3)

== Medal table ==
Medals were awarded in 97 events:

* Host nation (Norfolk Island)

Final medal table of the Games
Rank	Nation	Gold	Silver	Bronze	Total
1	Fiji (FIJ)	27	9	13	49
2	French Polynesia (PYF)	22	13	10	45
3	New Caledonia (NCL)	20	22	10	52
4	Samoa (SAM)	10	7	10	27
5	Papua New Guinea (PNG)	8	18	12	38
6	Norfolk Island (NFK)*	5	12	8	25
7	Tonga (TON)	3	3	6	12
8	Cook Islands (COK)	1	1	5	7
9	Niue (NIU)	1	0	3	4
10	Solomon Islands (SOL)	0	2	4	6
11	Vanuatu (VAN)	0	1	2	3
12	Northern Mariana Islands (NMI)	0	0	1	1
Totals (12 entries)		97	88	84	269

== See also ==
- Athletics at the 2001 South Pacific Mini Games

== Sources ==
- 6th South Pacific Mini Games: Norfolk Island 3rd to 14th December 2001 (PDF 6.5 MB) (Report). Norfolk Island Amateur Sports & Commonwealth Games Association. 2001. Archived from the original on 26 October 2017.
