= 2022 England Uganda netball series =

Three-match netball series

Tournament details
- Host country: England
- Dates: 5 October – 9 October
- Teams: 2

Final positions
- Champions: England
- Runners-up: Uganda

Tournament statistics
- Matches played: 3
- Top scorer(s): Mary Cholhok Nuba ( 116)

The 2022 England Uganda netball series, also known as the Vitality Netball International Series, saw England host Uganda in October 2022 for a three-match series. The series marked the start of England's preparations for the 2023 Netball World Cup. For Uganda, the series was part of a larger tour of the United Kingdom that saw them play two test matches against both Northern Ireland, and Wales; followed by a further test match against Scotland. England won the series 3-0.

== Squads ==
Squad lists
England	Uganda
Imogen Allison (co-captain); Laura Malcolm (co-captain); Eleanor Cardwell; Sophie Drakeford-Lewis; Zara Everitt; Funmi Fadoju; Alice Harvey; Hannah Joseph; Natalie Panagarry; Natasha Pavelin; Chelsea Pitman; Ellie Rattu; Paige Reed; Olivia Tchine; Francesca Williams	Peace Proscovia (captain); Joan Nampungu; Sandra Nambirige; Margaret Baagala; Irene Erayu; Shadia Nassanga; Mary Cholhok Nuba; Viola Asingo; Haniisha Muhammad; Faridah Kadondi; Rosette Namutebi; Shakira Nakanyike

== Match officials ==
=== Umpires ===
Umpire	Association
Tracie-Ann Griffiths	–
Alison Harrison	England
Ken Metekingi	New Zealand

=== Umpire Appointments Panel ===
Umpire	Association
Judith Groves	England

== Matches ==
=== First Test ===
5 October 2022	Report; Stats	England	60–51	Uganda	Motorpoint Arena, Nottingham	Sky Sports
5 October 2022	Report; Stats	Scoring by quarter: 16–11, 9–17, 17–9, 18–14			Motorpoint Arena, Nottingham	Sky Sports
5 October 2022	Report; Stats	Cardwell 38; Tchine 16; Sophie Drakeford-Lewis 6		Cholhok 34; Nassanga 17	Motorpoint Arena, Nottingham	Sky Sports

=== Second Test ===
8 October 2022	Report; Stats	England	53–45	Uganda	Copper Box Arena, London	Sky Sports
8 October 2022	Report; Stats	Scoring by quarter: 13–9, 11–14, 19–10, 10–12			Copper Box Arena, London	Sky Sports
8 October 2022	Report; Stats	Tchine 25; Cardwell 14; Sophie Drakeford-Lewis 14		Cholhok 36; Nassanga 9	Copper Box Arena, London	Sky Sports

=== Third Test ===
9 October 2022	Report; Stats	England	64–51	Uganda	Copper Box Arena, London	Sky Sports
9 October 2022	Report; Stats	Scoring by quarter: 17–11, 15–11, 13–18, 19–11			Copper Box Arena, London	Sky Sports
9 October 2022	Report; Stats	Cardwell 43; Tchine 18; Sophie Drakeford-Lewis 3		Cholhok 46; Nassanga 3 Erayu 2	Copper Box Arena, London	Sky Sports
