= 2024 Netball Nations Cup =

International netball tournament

Tournament details
- Host country: England
- Cities: London; Leeds
- Venue(s): OVO Arena Wembley; First Direct Arena
- Dates: 20–28 January 2024
- Teams: 4
- TV partner(s): Sky Sports (UK/Ireland); Sky Sport (New Zealand); Fox Sports (Australia)

Final positions
- Champions: Australia (9th title)
- Runners-up: England
- Third place: New Zealand

Tournament statistics
- Matches played: 8
- Top scorer(s): Grace Nweke 191/199 (96%)

The 2024 Vitality Netball Nations Cup was an international netball series hosted and organised by England Netball. It featured England, Australia, New Zealand and Uganda in a series, played in January 2024. The series was played over two successive weekends. The first weekend was played at London's OVO Arena Wembley while the second weekend was played at Leeds's First Direct Arena. The tournament effectively replaced the Netball Quad Series for 2024. South Africa opted out of taking part and were subsequently replaced by Uganda.

With a team coached by Stacey Marinkovich and captained by Liz Watson, Australia won the series after defeating England 69–49 in the final. Australia finished the series undefeated, winning all four matches, and Paige Hadley was named the series MVP. The series was broadcast live on Sky Sports in the United Kingdom and Ireland, on Sky Sport in New Zealand, on Fox Sports in Australia and on YouTube.

== Squads ==
Participating teams and rosters
Australia	England	New Zealand	Uganda
Sunday Aryang; Kiera Austin; Courtney Bruce; Sophie Dwyer; Sophie Garbin; Paige Hadley (vc); Sarah Klau; Cara Koenen; Jamie-Lee Price; Kate Moloney; Donnell Wallam; Liz Watson (c); Jo Weston	Halimat Adio; Imogen Allison; Eleanor Cardwell; Amy Carter; Funmi Fadoju; Sasha Glasgow; Helen Housby; Hannah Joseph; Natalie Metcalf; Berri Neil; Razia Quashie; Ellie Rattu; Fran Williams (c)	Karin Burger; Kate Burley; Maddy Gordon; Tayla Earle; Georgia Heffernan; Kate Heffernan (c); Kelly Jury; Phoenix Karaka (c); Amorangi Malesala; Grace Nweke; Mila Reuelu-Buchanan; Whitney Souness; Michaela Sokolich-Beatson; Amelia Walmsley	Lillian Achola; Florence Adunia; Margaret Baagala; Mercy Batamuliza; Mary Cholhok; Irene Eyaru (c); Faridah Kadondi; Haniisha Muhameed; Sarah Nakiyunga; Christine Nakitto; Sandra Nambirige; Shadia Nassanga
Head Coach: Stacey Marinkovich	Head Coach: Jess Thirlby	Head Coach: Noeline Taurua	Head Coach: Fred Mugerwa
Assistant coach: Nicole Richardson	Assistant coach: Liana Leota	Specialist coach: Briony Akle	Assistant coach: Peace Proscovia

== Debuts and milestones ==
- On 20 January 2024, Georgia Heffernan made her senior debut for New Zealand against Australia. With her sister, Kate Heffernan, already an established member of the team, the Heffernan sisters now became the third set of sisters to play international netball for New Zealand. The first set were their mother and aunt, Annette Heffernan and Maxine Blomquist. However, the Heffernan sisters are the first sisters to actually play in the same team at the same time.
- On 21 January 2024, Helen Housby made her 100th senior appearance for England against Australia.
- On 27 January 2024, Sarah Klau made her 50th senior appearance for Australia against Uganda.
- On 27 January 2024, Amorangi Malesala and Tayla Earle made their senior debuts for New Zealand against England.

== Match officials ==
Umpires

Umpire	Association
Gary Burgess	England
Rhian Edwards	Wales
Gareth Fowler	New Zealand
Alison Harrison	Wales
Anso Kemp	South Africa
Kate Mann	England

Umpire Appointments Panel

Umpire	Association
Cheryl Danson	England
Judith Groves	England

== Round robin stage ==
=== Round 1 ===
20 January 2024	Australia	63–50	New Zealand	OVO Arena Wembley
3:00PM	Cara Koenen 23/26 (88%); Sophie Garbin 17/18 (94%); Kiera Austin 16/21 (76%); Sophie Dwyer 7/8 (88%)	Stats	Grace Nweke 41/42 (98%); Georgia Heffernan 9/11 (82%)

20 January 2024	England	62–56	Uganda	OVO Arena Wembley
5:15PM	Eleanor Cardwell 31/33 (94%); Helen Housby 20/23 (87%); Berri Neil 11/12 (92%)	Stats	Mary Cholhok 38/41 (93%); Irene Eyaru 18/19 (95%)

=== Round 2 ===
21 January 2024	New Zealand	65–60	Uganda	OVO Arena Wembley
2:00PM	Grace Nweke 53/54 (98%); Georgia Heffernan 12/13 (92%)	Stats	Mary Cholhok 46/50 (92%); Irene Eyaru 10/10 (100%); Shadiah Nassanga 4/5 (80%)

21 January 2024	England	59–61	Australia	OVO Arena Wembley
4:15PM	Eleanor Cardwell 43/46 (93%); Helen Housby 16/21 (76%)	Stats	Sophie Garbin 26/27 (96%); Cara Koenen 12/13 (92%); Kiera Austin 12/12 (100%); Sophie Dwyer 11/12 (92%)

=== Round 3 ===
27 January 2024	Australia	63–49	Uganda	First Direct Arena
3:00PM	Donnell Wallam 31/33 (94%); Sophie Garbin 14/15 (93%); Cara Koenen 12/13 (92%); Kiera Austin 6/6 (100%)	Stats	Mary Cholhok 30/35 (86%); Shadiah Nassanga 10/10 (100%); Irene Eyaru 9/9 (100%)

27 January 2024	England	58–57	New Zealand	First Direct Arena
5:15PM	Eleanor Cardwell 35/40 (88%); Helen Housby 23/26 (88%)	Stats	Grace Nweke 47/50 (94%); Amorangi Malesala 6/7 (86%); Georgia Heffernan 4/4 (100%)

=== Table ===
Pos	Team	P	W	L	D	GF	GA	GD	Pts
1	Australia	3	3	0	0	187	158	29	6
2	England	3	2	1	0	179	174	5	4
3	New Zealand	3	1	2	0	172	181	–9	2
4	Uganda	3	0	3	0	165	190	–25	0

Qualified for Final
Qualified for 3rd/4th playoff

== Playoffs ==
=== 3rd/4th playoff ===
28 January 2024	New Zealand	62–57	Uganda	First Direct Arena
	Grace Nweke 50/53 (94%); Amorangi Malesala 11/12 (92%); Georgia Heffernan 1/1 (100%)		Mary Cholhok 45/47 (96%); Irene Eyaru 6/8 (75%); Shadiah Nassanga 6/6 (100%)

=== Final ===
28 January 2024	England	49–69	Australia	First Direct Arena
4:15PM	Helen Housby 27/30 (90%); Eleanor Cardwell 17/17 (100%); Sasha Glasgow 5/7 (71%)		Sophie Garbin 31/32 (97%); Sophie Dwyer 22/25 (88%); Cara Koenen 10/10 (100%); Kiera Austin 6/7 (86%)

== Final Placings ==
Rank	Team
1st place, gold medalist(s)	Australia
2nd place, silver medalist(s)	England
3rd place, bronze medalist(s)	New Zealand
4	Uganda
