= Netball at the 2011 All-Africa Games =

Netball at the All-Africa Games

Netball at the 2011 All-Africa Games in Maputo, Mozambique was held between 6–15 September 2011.

== Medal summary ==
Event	Gold	Silver	Bronze
Women	Uganda; Peace Proscovia; Amono Florence; Ruth Meeme; Halima Nakachwa; Esther Aawayo; Caroline Badaru; Caroline Nyafwono; Harriet Apako; Dorothy Tabia; Elizabeth Atonet	Tanzania; Mwanaidi Hassan; Nelly Anyingisye; Faraja Malaki; Evodia Kazinja; Paskalia Uibayasa; Dorita Mbunda; Jackeline Shemeza; Pili Peter; Agnes Simicon; Mwanaham Saida; Maciret Constantine; Siwa Juma	Zambia; Delilah Hamemba; Diana Banda; Beaty Nakazwe; Brenda Mwila; Mercy Chilembo; Ynonne Hakolo; Marget Mutafela; Carol Lwando; Mable Mulemba; Agnes Banda; Monica Malina; Martha Mafupi

=== Medal table ===
Rank	Nation	Gold	Silver	Bronze	Total
1	Uganda	1	0	0	1
2	Tanzania	0	1	0	1
3	Zambia	0	0	1	1
Totals (3 entries)		1	1	1	3

== Results ==
=== Standings ===
Pos	Team	Pld	W	D	L	GF	GA	GD	Pts
1st place, gold medalist(s)	Uganda	8	8	0	0	552	250	+302	16
2nd place, silver medalist(s)	Tanzania	8	6	0	2	432	266	+166	12
3rd place, bronze medalist(s)	Zambia	8	6	0	2	461	305	+156	12
4	Kenya	8	5	0	3	455	303	+152	10
5	Botswana	8	4	0	4	430	287	+143	8
6	South Africa	8	3	0	5	389	282	+107	6
7	Zimbabwe	8	3	0	5	398	303	+95	6
8	Ghana	8	1	0	7	194	718	−524	2
9	Mozambique	8	0	0	8	93	690	−597	0

=== Fixtures ===
5 September 2011; 16:00	Zimbabwe	71 – 3	Mozambique	IMAP

6 September 2011; 10:00	South Africa	36 – 34	Botswana	IMAP

6 September 2011; 15:00	Uganda	61 – 31	Zambia	IMAP

6 September 2011; 16:30	Tanzania	36 – 35	Kenya	IMAP

7 September 2011; 10:00	South Africa	79 – 22	Ghana	IMAP

7 September 2011; 11:30	Botswana	40 – 35	Zimbabwe	IMAP

7 September 2011; 15:00	Uganda	103 – 8	Mozambique	IMAP

7 September 2011; 16:30	Kenya	46 – 38	Zambia	IMAP

8 September 2011; 10:00	Tanzania	97 – 24	Ghana	IMAP

8 September 2011; 11:30	Zimbabwe	30 – 29	South Africa	IMAP

8 September 2011; 15:00	Botswana	98 – 13	Mozambique	IMAP

8 September 2011; 16:30	Uganda	53 – 40	Kenya	IMAP

9 September 2011; 10:00	Zambia	46 – 42	Tanzania	IMAP

9 September 2011; 11:30	Zimbabwe	102 – 23	Ghana	IMAP

9 September 2011; 15:00	South Africa	83 – 5	Mozambique	IMAP

9 September 2011; 16:30	Uganda	55 – 41	Botswana	IMAP

10 September 2011; 10:00	Kenya	89 – 24	Ghana	IMAP

10 September 2011; 11:30	Tanzania	46 – 37	Zimbabwe	IMAP

10 September 2011; 15:00	Zambia	93 – 7	Mozambique	IMAP

10 September 2011; 16:30	Uganda	56 – 35	South Africa	IMAP

11 September 2011; 10:00	Botswana	92 – 20	Ghana	IMAP

11 September 2011; 11:30	Kenya	54 – 47	Zimbabwe	IMAP

11 September 2011; 15:00	Tanzania	95 – 8	Mozambique	IMAP

11 September 2011; 16:30	Zambia	52 – 51	South Africa	IMAP

12 September 2011; 10:00	Uganda	115 – 17	Ghana	IMAP

12 September 2011; 15:00	Botswana	47 – 41	Kenya	IMAP

12 September 2011; 16:30	Zambia	51 – 39	Zimbabwe	IMAP

13 September 2011; 10:00	Uganda	52 – 41	Tanzania	IMAP

13 September 2011; 11:30	Kenya	51 – 47	South Africa	IMAP

13 September 2011; 15:00	Ghana	48 – 38	Mozambique	IMAP

13 September 2011; 16:30	Zambia	44 – 43	Botswana	IMAP

14 September 2011; 10:00	Tanzania	32 – 29	South Africa	IMAP

14 September 2011; 15:00	Kenya	99 – 11	Mozambique	IMAP

14 September 2011; 16:30	Uganda	57 – 37	Zimbabwe	IMAP

15 September 2011; 10:00	Zambia	106 – 16	Ghana	IMAP

15 September 2011; 11:30	Tanzania	43 – 35	Botswana	IMAP
