= 2013 African Netball Championship =

International netball series hosted by Malawi

Tournament details
- Host country: Malawi
- City: Blantyre
- Venue(s): Blantyre Youth Centre; College of Medicine
- Dates: 24–28 June 2013
- Teams: 8

Final positions
- Champions: South Africa
- Runner-up: Malawi
- Third place: Uganda

The 2013 African Netball Championship was hosted by Malawi in June 2013. It was the second African Netball Championships tournament. It featured eight African national teams. With a team coached by Elize Kotze and captained by Maryka Holtzhausen, South Africa won the tournament. South Africa finished the tournament undefeated, winning all five of their matches. In the final they defeated Malawi 54–52 after extra time.

== Head coaches and captains ==
Team	Head coach	Captain
Botswana		
Malawi	Peace Chawinga	
Namibia		
South Africa	Elize Kotze	Maryka Holtzhausen
Swaziland		
Uganda	Fred Mugerwa	
Zambia	Charles Zulu	
Zimbabwe		

== Pool 1 ==
=== Matches ===
Round 1

24 June 2013	Malawi	68–43	Zimbabwe	College of Medicine

25 June 2013	Zambia	55–41	Botswana

Round 2

26 June 2013	Malawi	55–48	Zambia	Blantyre Youth Centre

26 June 2013	Zimbabwe	51-49	Botswana

Round 3

27 June 2013	Malawi	65–23	Botswana

27 June 2013	Zambia	63–44	Zimbabwe

=== Final table ===
Pos	Team	P	W	D	L	GF	GA	GD	Pts
1	Malawi	3	3	0	0	188	114	+74	6
2	Zambia	3	2	0	1	166	140	+26	4
3	Zimbabwe	3	1	0	2	138	180	–42	2
4	Botswana	3	0	0	3	113	171	–58	0

Qualified for Semi-finals
Eliminated

== Pool 2 ==
=== Matches ===
Round 1

25 June 2013	South Africa	75–34	Namibia

25 June 2013	Uganda	69–38	Swaziland

Round 2

26 June 2013	South Africa	73–28	Swaziland

26 June 2013	Uganda	72–45	Namibia

Round 3

27 June 2013	Namibia	53–30	Swaziland

27 June 2013	South Africa	46–39	Uganda
16:00

=== Final table ===
Pos	Team	P	W	D	L	GF	GA	GD	Pts
1	South Africa	3	3	0	0	195	101	+94	6
2	Uganda	3	2	0	1	180	129	+51	4
3	Namibia	3	1	0	2	132	177	–45	2
4	Swaziland	3	0	0	3	96	196	–100	0

Qualified for Semi-finals
Eliminated

== Playoffs ==
=== Semi-finals ===
28 June 2013	Malawi	55–46	Uganda	Blantyre Youth Centre
9:00

28 June 2013	South Africa	66–48	Zambia
11:00

=== Final ===
28 June 2013	South Africa	54–52	Malawi	Blantyre Youth Centre
14:00

Teams

Head Coach: Elize Kotze; Assistant coach: Lana Krige Squad: C, WA, WD Erin Burger; GS Colleen Ferreira; GA Maryka Holtzhausen (c); GD Karla Mostert; GS, GA Tsakane Mbewe; C, WD Precious Mthembu; WD Bongiwe Msomi (vc); WD, GK Adele Niemand; C Thuli Qegu; GK Vanes-Mari du Toit; WA Yolandi Saalmans (Stone)	Head Coach: Peace Chawinga; Assistant coach: Mary Waya Squad: GD, WD Joanna Kachilika; GA Beatrice Kadango; C, WA Tina Kamzati; C, WA Bridget Kumwenda; GS Jessica Mazengera; GD, GK Grace Mhango; GD, WD Joyce Mvula; C, WA Takondwa Lwazi; GD Caroline Ngwira; GD, GK Loreen Ngwira; GS, GA Sindi Simtowe; GK Towera Vinkhumbo

== Final Rankings ==
Pos	Team	P	W	D	L	GF	GA	GD	Pts
Gold	South Africa	5	5	0	0	315	201	+114	10
Silver	Malawi	5	4	0	1	295	214	+81	8
3	Uganda	4	2	0	2	226	184	+42	4
4	Zambia	4	2	0	2	214	206	+8	4
5	Zimbabwe	3	1	0	2	138	180	–42	2
6	Namibia	3	1	0	2	132	177	–45	2
7	Botswana	3	0	0	3	113	171	–58	0
8	Swaziland	3	0	0	3	96	196	–100	0

Qualified for Semi-finals
Eliminated
