= Lefébre Rademan =

South African netball player

Personal information
- Born: 22 August 1996 (age 29) Riversdale, Western Cape, South Africa
- Height: 1.72 m (5 ft 8 in)
- School: Langenhoven High School
- University: University of the Free State

Netball career
- Playing positions: GA, WA
Years	Club team	Apps
?–2019	UFS Kovsies	?
2019–2020	Free State Crinums	?
2021	London Pulse	18
2022–2023	Celtic Dragons	20
2024–	Severn Stars	0
- (Correct as of 4 January 2024)
Years	National team	Caps
?–?	South Africa U-18	?
?–2017	South Africa U-21	?
2019–	South Africa	12+
- (Correct as of 23 March 2021)

Lefébre Rademan (born 22 August 1996) is a South African netball player, who has represented the national team. At club level, she plays for Severn Stars in the British Netball Superleague (NSL), and has previously played for Celtic Dragons and London Pulse in the NSL, as well as Free State Crinums in the South African Netball League.

== Personal life ==
Rademan is from Riversdale, Western Cape, South Africa. She attended Langenhoven High School, and later studied education at the University of the Free State in Bloemfontein.

== Club career ==
Rademan started her career as a defender, but now plays as either a goal attack or a wing attack. Whilst at the University of the Free State, Rademan played Varsity netball for their team, the Kovsies. She later captained the side. She was part of the 2018 Kovsies team that won the Varsity Cup, and in 2019, she was named the season's best player and player's player of the year.

In the same year, Rademan played for Free State Crinums in the South African Netball League. She was the Crinums' captain, and they finished third in the league. Rademan won four player of the match awards in the tournament. In 2020, she captained the Free State Crinums again, and was named Shooter of the Tournament. The Crinums came second, losing in the final to Gauteng Jaguars. Ahead of the 2021 Netball Superleague season, Rademan signed for London Pulse. She made her debut for London Pulse in a match against Surrey Storm in February 2021. Ahead of the 2022 Netball Superleague season, Rademan signed for Celtic Dragons. She re-signed for the team for the 2023 season, but did not play due to injury. Rademan signed for Severn Stars ahead of the 2024 Netball Superleague season.

== International career ==
In her matric year (final year of high school), Rademan played for South Africa under-18s. She has also played for South Africa under-21s, and represented them at the 2017 Netball World Youth Cup.

Rademan received her first callup to the South Africa national netball team whilst in the middle of a coaching session in Bloemfontein. She made her debut in a 2019 Africa Netball Cup match against Lesotho, and she also played in South Africa's Africa Cup matches against Malawi, Uganda, Kenya, Zimbabwe, and Zambia. Later in the year, she played in the series against England. She played in the 2020 Netball Nations Cup, and in South Africa's series against Malawi. Rademan was unable to play for South Africa in their 2021 SPAR Challenge Series matches against Uganda and Namibia as the rearranged dates clashed with her London Pulse matches. Rademan played at the 2022 Commonwealth Games, where she sustained an anterior cruciate ligament injury. In early 2023, she trained with locally-based South African players as part of her rehabilitation.
