= 2024 Fast5 Netball World Series =

International Fast5 tournament hosted by New Zealand

Tournament details
- Host country: New Zealand
- City: Christchurch
- Venue: Wolfbrook Arena
- Dates: 9–10 November 2024
- Teams: 6
- TV partner(s): 7plus (Australia); Sky Sport (New Zealand); SuperSport (South Africa); SportsMax (Caribbean); NetballPass

Final positions
- Champions: Australia (3rd title)
- Runners-up: New Zealand
- Third place: Uganda

Tournament statistics
- Matches played: 18

The 2024 Fast5 Netball World Series was the 12th Fast5 Netball World Series. New Zealand hosted Australia, England, Jamaica, South Africa and Uganda in a series, played in November 2024, at Christchurch's Wolfbrook Arena. The series also featured a men's tournament. With a team coached by Anita Keelan and captained by Ruby Bakewell-Doran, Australia won their third successive series after defeating New Zealand 34–30 in the final. Uganda finished the series in third place after beating South Africa 46–42 in a play off. Earlier in the tournament, Uganda defeated both England and Jamaica. The series was broadcast live on 7plus in Australia, on Sky Sport in New Zealand, on SuperSport in South Africa, on SportsMax in the Caribbean and on NetballPass.

== Squads ==
Participating teams and rosters
Australia	England	Jamaica	New Zealand	South Africa	Uganda
Lucy Austin; Reilley Batcheldor; Ruby Bakewell-Doran (c); Lauren Frew; Kim Jenner; Matisse Letherbarrow; Leesa Mi Mi; Teigan O'Shannassy; Amy Sligar; Tayla Williams	Sophie Egbaran; Zara Everitt (c); Harriet Jones; Sophie Kelly; Tash Pavelin; Jayda Pechova; Isabella Phillips; Emma Rayner; Paige Reed; Alicia Scholes	Shadine Bartley; Paula-Ann Burton; Simone Gordon; Zaudi Green; Tiffany Langley; Roxonna McLean; Amanda Pinkney; Kimone Shaw; Kestina Sturridge; Corneilia Walters	Kate Burley; Tayla Earle; Georgie Edgecombe; Catherine Hall; Paris Lokotui; Erena Mikaere; Martina Salmon; Michaela Sokolich-Beatson (c); Saviour Tui; Maia Wilson	Shannon Bartlett; Amber Coraizin; Syntiche Kabuya; Boitumelo Mahloko; Kamogelo Maseko; Lefébre Rademan; Ané Retief; Zandre Smith; Rolene Streutker; Sanmarie Visser	Margaret Baagala; Mary Cholhok; Irene Eyaru; Faridah Kadondi; Hanisha Muhameed; Joyce Nakibuule; Christine Nakitto; Sandra Nambirige; Christine Namulumba; Shadia Nassanga
Head Coach: Anita Keelan	Head Coach: Sonia Mkoloma	Head Coach: Nardia Hansen	Head Coach: Yvette McCausland-Durie	Head Coach: Martha Mosoahle-Samm	Head Coach:
Assistant coach:	Assistant coach: Lauren Palmer	Assistant coach: Dalton Hines	Assistant coach:	Assistant coach: Erin Burger	Assistant coach:

== Round robin stage ==
=== Round 1 ===
9 November 2024	South Africa	33–25	England
12:30 (NZDT)	Zandre Smit 20; Rolene Streukter 7 Lefébre Rademan 4 Kamogelo Maseko 2	Stats	Paige Reed 13; Sophie Egbaran 6 Harriet Jones 5 Sophie Kelly 1

9 November 2024	New Zealand	39–19	Jamaica
13:15 (NZDT)	Martina Salmon 17; Maia Wilson 11; Saviour Tui 11	Stats	Amanda Pinkney 13; Simone Gordon 6

9 November 2024	Australia	44–37	Uganda
14:00 (NZDT)	Matisse Letherbarrow 30; Lucy Austin 7 Lauren Frew 4 Reilley Batcheldor 3	Stats	Mary Cholhok 17; Shadiah Nassanga 10; Irene Eyaru 5 Hanisha Muhameed 4 Christine Namulumba 1

=== Round 2 ===
9 November 2024	England	35–15	Jamaica
15:30 (NZDT)	Harriet Jones 13; Paige Reed 8 Sophie Egbaran 8 Sophie Kelly 6	Stats	Amanda Pinkney 9 Shadine Bartley 6

9 November 2024	Australia	49–26	South Africa
16:15 (NZDT)	Matisse Letherbarrow 20; Lucy Austin 21; Reilley Batcheldor 7 Lauren Frew 1	Report; Stats	Rolene Streukter 16; Zandre Smit 6 Kamogelo Maseko 4

9 November 2024	New Zealand	40–27	Uganda
17:00 (NZDT)	Martina Salmon 24; Maia Wilson 16	Report; Stats	Shadiah Nassanga 14; Mary Cholhok 6 Irene Eyaru 5 Hanisha Muhameed 2

=== Round 3 ===
9 November 2024	Uganda	31–22	England
18:45 (NZDT)	Shadiah Nassanga 17; Mary Cholhok 10; Hanisha Muhameed 2 Irene Eyaru 1 Christine Namulumba 1	Stats	Sophie Kelly 13; Harriet Jones 4 Sophie Egbaran 3 Paige Reed 2

9 November 2024	South Africa	33–25	Jamaica
19:30 (NZDT)	Zandre Smit 18; Rolene Streukter 7 Kamogelo Maseko 7 Lefébre Rademan 1	Stats	Shadine Bartley 12; Amanda Pinkney 6 Kestina Sturridge 7

9 November 2024	New Zealand	26–41	Australia
20:15 (NZDT)	Maia Wilson 13; Martina Salmon 9 Paris Lokotui 2 Saviour Tui 2	Report; Stats	Lucy Austin 17; Matisse Letherbarrow 15; Reilley Batcheldor 6 Lauren Frew 3

=== Round 4 ===
9 November 2024	Australia	56–39	Jamaica
12:00 (NZDT)	Lucy Austin 22; Matisse Letherbarrow 18; Reilley Batcheldor 8 Lauren Frew 8	Stats	Simone Gordon 18; Shadine Bartley 11; Kestina Sturridge 10

9 November 2024	New Zealand	32–28	England
12:45 (NZDT)	Martina Salmon 17; Maia Wilson 7 Saviour Tui 6 Paris Lokotui 2	Report; Stats	Paige Reed 14; Sophie Kelly 9 Harriet Jones 3 Sophie Egbaran 2

9 November 2024	South Africa	37–20	Uganda
13:30 (NZDT)	Zandre Smit 18; Lefébre Rademan 8 Rolene Streukter 8 Kamogelo Maseko 3	Stats	Mary Cholhok 12; Irene Eyaru 8

=== Round 5 ===
10 November 2024	Australia	41–27	England
15:00 (NZDT)	Lucy Austin 17; Reilley Batcheldor 12; Matisse Letherbarrow 8 Lauren Frew 4	Stats	Harriet Jones 13; Paige Reed 10; Sophie Kelly 2 Sophie Egbaran 2

10 November 2024	New Zealand	41–40	South Africa
15:45 (NZDT)	Martina Salmon 21; Maia Wilson 14; Saviour Tui 5 Paris Lokotui 1	Report; Stats	Rolene Streukter 18; Lefébre Rademan 10; Zandre Smit 7 Kamogelo Maseko 5

10 November 2024	Uganda	43–26	Jamaica
16:30 (NZDT)	Shadiah Nassanga 26; Hanisha Muhameed 9 Irene Eyaru 8	Stats	Simone Gordon 9 Amanda Pinkney 9 Shadine Bartley 6 Kestina Sturridge 2

=== Table ===
Pos	Team	P	W	D	L	GF	GA	GD	Pts
1	Australia	5	5	0	0	231	155	+76	10
2	New Zealand	5	4	0	1	178	177	+1	8
3	South Africa	5	3	0	2	169	160	+9	6
4	Uganda	5	2	0	3	158	169	-11	4
5	England	5	1	0	4	137	152	-15	2
6	Jamaica	5	0	0	5	124	206	-82	0

Qualified for the final
Qualified for 3rd/4th place match
Qualified for 5th/6th place match

== Playoffs ==
=== 5th v 6th Playoff ===
10 November 2024	England	38–36	Jamaica
17:40 (NZDT)	Sophie Kelly 17; Harriet Jones 8 Paige Reed 8 Sophie Egbaran 5		Amanda Pinkney 19; Simone Gordon 12; Shadine Bartley 5

=== 3rd v 4th Playoff ===
10 November 2024	Uganda	46–42	South Africa
18:30 (NZDT)	Mary Cholhok 22; Shadiah Nassanga 16; Hanisha Muhameed 8		Rolene Streukter 28; Zandre Smit 14

=== Final ===
10 November 2024	New Zealand	30–34	Australia
20:10 (NZDT)	Martina Salmon 17; Maia Wilson 6 Saviour Tui 4 Paris Lokotui 3	Stats	Lucy Austin 13; Matisse Letherbarrow 11; Reilley Batcheldor 8 Lauren Frew 2

== Final Placings ==
Rank	Team
1st place, gold medalist(s)	Australia
2nd place, silver medalist(s)	New Zealand
3rd place, bronze medalist(s)	Uganda
4	South Africa
5	England
6	Jamaica
