= 2021 SPAR Challenge Series =

International netball series hosted by South Africa

Tournament details
- Host country: South Africa
- City: Cape Town
- Venue: Cape Town International Convention Centre
- Dates: 24–31 March 2021
- Teams: 5
- TV partner: SuperSport (South Africa)

Final positions
- Champions: South Africa
- Runners-up: Uganda
- Third place: Namibia

The 2021 SPAR Challenge Series was the sixth Diamond Challenge netball series.. The series was played at the Cape Town International Convention Centre and broadcast live on SuperSport in South Africa. It was originally scheduled to be played in January 2021, however it was delayed due to a resurgence of the COVID-19 pandemic in South Africa. It was eventually played in March 2021. It was effectively two separate series played alongside each other. South Africa, Namibia and Uganda played each other in a Tri Nations Series that earned them points on the World Netball Rankings. Meanwhile, two invitational teams, a Netball South Africa President's XII and the Baby Proteas played each other in a series of five matches. These two teams were basically the South Africa B and under-21 teams respectively. Both the South Africa and Uganda squads did not feature any players from the Netball Superleague, Suncorp Super Netball or the ANZ Premiership. South Africa won the Tri Nations Series, winning all six of their matches while the President's XII won their series against the Baby Proteas 4–1.

== Head coaches and captains ==
Team	Head coach	Captain
South Africa	Dorette Badenhorst	Bongiwe Msomi
Namibia	Julene Meyer	Jatjinda Kambatuku
Uganda	Rashid Mubiru	Stella Oyella
(South Africa) President's XII	Jenny van Dyk	Marlize de Bruin
(South Africa) Baby Proteas	Elsje Jordaan	

== Debuts ==
- On 25 March 2021, Nonsikelelo Mazibuko, Sian Moore, Nozipho Ntshangase, Simoné Rabie and Chantelle Swart all made their senior debuts for South Africa against Namibia.

== Match officials ==
=== Umpires ===
Ranking Matches

Umpire	Association
Anso Kemp	South Africa
Elizna van den Berg	South Africa
Theresa Prince	South Africa
Chakatsa Lephole	Lesotho

Non-Ranking Matches

Umpire	Association
Salomé Britz	South Africa
Tharina Opperman	South Africa
Leonard Masao	South Africa
Theo Moletsane	South Africa

=== Umpire Appointments Panel ===
Umpire	Association
Annie Kloppers	South Africa
Marielouw van der Merwe	South Africa

== Matches ==
=== Day 1 ===
25 March 2021	South Africa	58–30	Namibia
10:00	Nonsikelelo Mazibuko 21/25 (84%); Sian Moore 23/27 (85%); Renske Stoltz 11/11 (100%); Chantelle Swart 3/7 (43%)		Anna Kaspar 23/28 (82%); Jatjinda Kambatuku 4/5 (80%); Rachalle Roetz 3/3 (100%)

25 March 2021	(South Africa) President's XII	56–42	(South Africa) Baby Proteas
14:00	Chanté Louw 40/51 (78%); Nicholé Taljaard 10/16 (63%); Talja Venter 1/1 (100%)		Rolene Streutker 27/31 (87%); Elmeré van der Berg 11/18 (61%); Lucy Strydom 4/8 (50%)

25 March 2021	South Africa	49–34	Uganda
14:00	Nonsikelelo Mazibuko 32/34 (94%); Renske Stoltz 17/24 (71%)		Irene Eyaru 19/20 (95%); Shadiah Nassanga 12/15 (80%); Stella Oyella 3/4 (75%)

=== Day 2 ===
26 March 2021	(South Africa) President's XII	54–49	(South Africa) Baby Proteas
16:00

26 March 2021	Uganda	49–28	Namibia
18:00

=== Day 3 ===
27 March 2021	(South Africa) Baby Proteas	45–59	Uganda
16:00

27 March 2021	South Africa	66–31	Namibia
18:00	Sian Moore 26/29 (90%); Nonsikelelo Mazibuko 16/17 (94%); Renske Stoltz 13/15 (87%); Chantelle Swart 11/14 (79%)		Anna Kaspar 14/15 (93%); Nanguloshi Kamutushi 2/2 (100%)

=== Day 4 ===
28 March 2021	Uganda	59–30	Namibia
10:00	Shadiah Nassanga 37/42 (88%); Irene Eyaru 22/23 (96%)		Anna Kaspar 17/19 (89%); Rachalle Roetz 8/9 (89%); Jatjinda Kambatuku 5/6 (83%)

28 March 2021	(South Africa) Baby Proteas	48–41	(South Africa) President's XII
16:00

28 March 2021	South Africa	43–36	Uganda
18:00	Sian Moore 27/30 (90%); Renske Stoltz 16/21 (76%)		Shadiah Nassanga 20/24 (83%); Irene Eyaru 16/16 (100%)

=== Day 5 ===
29 March 2021	(South Africa) President's XII	52–46	(South Africa) Baby Proteas
16:00	Chanté Louw 26/36 (72%); Nicholé Taljaard 26/27 (96%)		Rolene Streutker 19/24 (79%); Elmeré van der Berg 15/19 (79%); Kamogelo Maseko 12/17 (71%)

29 March 2021	Uganda	57–27	Namibia
18:00

=== Day 6 ===
30 March 2021	(South Africa) President's XII	38–36	(South Africa) Baby Proteas
16:00	Chanté Louw 24/35 (69%); Talja Venter 9/19 (47%); Alicia Puren 5/7 (71%)		Elmeré van der Berg 18/21 (86%); Rolene Streutker 11/14 (79%); Kamogelo Maseko 7/13 (54%)

30 March 2021	South Africa	59–26	Namibia
18:00	Nonsikelelo Mazibuko 25/30 (83%); Chantelle Swart 14/17 (82%); Sian Moore 14/14 (100%); Renske Stoltz 6/7 (86%)		Anna Kaspar 12/14 (86%); Kambatuku Jatjinda 11/17 (65%); Nanguloshi Kamutushi 3/7 (43%)

=== Day 7 ===
31 March 2021	(South Africa) President's XII	44–32	Namibia
14:00	Nomfundo Mngomezulu 16/19 (84%); Chanté Louw 14/24 (58%); Talja Venter 13/19 (68%); Jessica Robyn Du Plessis 0/1 (0%)		Anna Kaspar 20/26 (77%); Jatjinda Kambatuku 5/5 (100%); Nanguloshi Kamutushi 3/5 (60%); Rachalle Roetz 4/7 (57%)

31 March 2021	South Africa	44–32	Uganda
16:00	Sian Moore 26/33 (79%); Renske Stoltz 18/26 (69%)		Shadiah Nassanga 17/17 (100%); Irene Eyaru 15/18 (83%)

== Final table ==
Pos	Team	P	W	L	D	GF	GA	GD	Pts
1	South Africa	6	6	0	0	319	201	118	12
2	Uganda	6	3	3	0	267	221	46	6
3	Namibia	6	0	6	0	172	348	–176	0

Winners

== Award winners ==
Award	Winner	Team
Player of the Series	Monique Reyneke	South Africa
Best Shooter	Irene Eyaru	Uganda
Best Mid Court	Bongiwe Msomi	South Africa
Best Defender	Joan Nampugu	Uganda
