= 2018 World University Netball Championship =

International netball tournament hosted by Uganda

Tournament details
- Host country: Uganda
- City: Kampala
- Venue: Makerere University
- Dates: 17–21 September 2018
- Teams: 7

Final positions
- Champions: Uganda (1st title)
- Runners-up: South Africa
- Third place: Singapore

Tournament statistics
- Matches played: 22

The 2018 World University Netball Championship was a tournament organised by the Fédération Internationale du Sport Universitaire and the Uganda Netball Federation. It was the third World University Netball Championship. It was hosted at Makerere University in Kampala. The championship was won by Uganda who defeated South Africa 44–43 in the gold medal match. The Prime Minister of Uganda, Ruhakana Rugunda presented the winners trophy to Uganda's captain, Irene Eyaru. Singapore finished third after they defeated Zimbabwe 45–40 in their final match.

== Teams, head coaches and captains ==
Team	Head coach	Captain
Kenya		Hellen Sinoya
Namibia ^{1}		
Singapore	Joanne Loo	Tabitha Ong
South Africa	Jenny van Dyk ^{2}	
Sri Lanka	Surenthini Sithamparanathan	Thushara Jayasekara
Uganda	Rashid Mubiru^{3}	Irene Eyaru
United States ^{4}	Moreen Beierlein	Amara Mbionwu
Zimbabwe		

Notes

- ^1 Namibia were included in a draw made in August 2018. However, they subsequently withdrew, possibly due to a lack of funding.
- ^2 Dumisani Chauke also listed as a South Africa coach.
- ^3 Imelda Nyongesa also mentioned as a Uganda coach.
- ^4 The United States were represented by a Netball America team.

== Matches ==
=== Day 1 ===
Monday, 17 September 2018	South Africa	117–4	United States
10:00	Alicia Pulen 44/53 (83%) ?? 73		Amara Mbionwu 4

Monday, 17 September 2018	Zimbabwe	44–31	Sri Lanka
12:00	Letwin Ncube 36 ?? 8

Monday, 17 September 2018	Singapore	39–38	Kenya
14:00

Monday, 17 September 2018	Uganda	102–16	United States
16:00

=== Day 2 ===
Tuesday, 18 September 2018	Uganda	105–15	Kenya
10:00	Mary Nuba 72/92 (78%); Irene Eyaru 31/33 (94%) ?? 2

Tuesday, 18 September 2018	South Africa	116–6	Sri Lanka
12:00

Tuesday, 18 September 2018	Zimbabwe	40–28	United States
14:00

Tuesday, 18 September 2018	Uganda	77–19	Singapore
16:00

=== Day 3 ===
Wednesday, 19 September 2018	Kenya	41–28	Zimbabwe
10:00

Wednesday, 19 September 2018	South Africa	92–11	Singapore
12:00

Wednesday, 19 September 2018	Uganda	133–24	Sri Lanka
14:00

Wednesday, 19 September 2018	Kenya	44–40	United States
16:00

Wednesday, 19 September 2018	South Africa	105–12	Zimbabwe
18:00

=== Day 4 ===
Thursday, 20 September 2018	United States	41–37	Singapore
10:00

Thursday, 20 September 2018	Kenya	62–33	Sri Lanka
12:00

Thursday, 20 September 2018	Uganda	104–10	Zimbabwe
14:00

Thursday, 20 September 2018	Singapore	62–37	Sri Lanka
16:00

Thursday, 20 September 2018	South Africa	91–7	Kenya
18:00

=== Day 5 ===
Friday, 21 September 2018	Uganda	42–42	South Africa
10:00

Friday, 21 September 2018	Sri Lanka	50–48	United States
12:00

Friday, 21 September 2018	Singapore	45–40	Zimbabwe
14:00

=== Table ===
Pos	Team	P	W	D	L	GF	GA	GD	Pts
1	South Africa	6	5	1	0	562	83	+479	11
2	Uganda	6	5	1	0	562	126	+436	11
3	Singapore	6	3	0	3	213	325	-112	6
4	Kenya	6	3	0	3	220	345	-125	6
5	Zimbabwe	6	2	0	4	182	367	-185	4
6	United States	6	1	0	5	178	388	-210	2
7	Sri Lanka	6	1	0	5	182	465	-283	2

Qualified for the Gold medal match

== Gold medal match ==
Friday, 21 September 2018	Uganda	44–43	South Africa
18.00

== Final placings ==
Rank	Team
1st place, gold medalist(s)	Uganda
2nd place, silver medalist(s)	South Africa
3rd place, bronze medalist(s)	Singapore
4	Kenya
5	Zimbabwe
6	United States
7	Sri Lanka

== Medallists ==
Gold	Silver	Bronze
Uganda; Coach: Rashid Mubiru	South Africa; Coach: Jenny van Dyk	Singapore; Coach: Joanne Loo
Florence Adunia; Suzan Atino; Irene Eyaru (c); Privas Keyin; Betty Kizza; Shaffie Nakwanja; Sharifah Nalunkuma; Joan Nampungu; Brenda Namubiru; Vicky Nantumbwe; Mary Nuba; Robinah Nyakecho	Stephenie Brandt; Marlize de Bruin; Chante Louw; Tshina Mdau; Khomotso Mamburu; Sikholiwe Mdletshe; Lungile Mthembu; Nobulele Phuza; Alicia Puren; Jeanté Strydom; Chantelle Swart; Nicolé Taljaard; Jasmine Ziegelmeier	Alicia Tan Li Yin; Brenda Poh Ing Ting; Callista Koh Xin Zhi; Chanya Lee; Cheah Xuan Sabina; Dawne Lim Wan Yi; Merilyn Cheong; Rindy Lok; Sherlyn Ng Yun Lin; Tabitha Ong Jie Yi (c); Tan Shi Ni; Vera Phang Jia Li
