= 2022 Fast5 Netball World Series =

International Fast5 tournament hosted by New Zealand

Tournament details
- Host country: New Zealand
- City: Christchurch
- Venue: Wolfbrook Arena
- Dates: 5–6 November 2022
- Teams: 6
- TV partner(s): 7plus (Australia); Sky Sport (New Zealand); SuperSport (South Africa); SportsMax (Caribbean); FanCode (India); NetballPass

Final positions
- Champions: Australia (1st title)
- Runners-up: South Africa
- Third place: New Zealand

Tournament statistics
- Matches played: 18

The 2022 Fast5 Netball World Series was the 10th Fast5 Netball World Series. New Zealand hosted Australia, England, Jamaica, South Africa and Uganda in a series, played in November 2022, at Christchurch's Wolfbrook Arena. The series also featured, for the first time, a men's tournament. With a team coached by Briony Akle and captained by Tara Hinchliffe, Australia won the series for the first time after defeating South Africa 34–20 in the final. By claiming silver, South Africa achieved their best result in the series to date. New Zealand finished the series in third place. The series was broadcast live on 7plus in Australia, on Sky Sport in New Zealand, on SuperSport in South Africa, on SportsMax in the Caribbean, on FanCode in India and on NetballPass worldwide.

== Squads ==
Participating teams and rosters
Australia	England	Jamaica	New Zealand	South Africa	Uganda
Lucy Austin; Jessica Anstiss; Kelsey Browne; Sophie Dwyer; Sophie Garbin; Tara Hinchliffe (c); Georgie Horjus; Kim Jenner; Matilda McDonell; Hannah Mundy	Zara Everitt (c); Elle McDonald; Taylor McKevitt; Tash Pavelin; Lois Pearson; Jayda Pechova; Ellie Rattu; Paige Reed; Alicia Scholes; Emma Thacker	Romelda Aiken (c); Gezelle Allison; Theresa Beckford; Mischa Creary; Abigail Daley; Tafiya Hunter; Roxonna McLean; Amanda Pinkney; Crystal Plummer; Kimone Shaw	Kate Burley; Aliyah Dunn; Tayla Earle; Georgia Heffernan; Kristiana Manu'a; Tiana Metuarau; Kimiora Poi (c); Elle Temu; Filda Vui; Samantha Winders	Shannon Bartlett; Xandri Fourie; Didintle Keebine; Owethu Ngubane; Refiloe Nketsa; Zandre Smit; Nicola Smith; Jeanie Steyn (c); Jeanté Strydom; Nicholé Taljaard	Margaret Baagala; Mary Cholhok; Irene Eyaru; Muhameed Haniisha; Faridah Kadondi; Norah Lunkuse; Sandra Nambirige; Christine Namulumba; Joan Nampungu (c); Shadia Nassanga
Head Coach: Briony Akle	Head Coach: Kathryn Ratnapala	Head Coach: Annette Daley	Head Coach: Debbie Fuller	Head Coach: Martha Mosoahle-Samm	Head Coach: Fred Mugerwa
Assistant coach: Cathy Fellows	Assistant coach: Sheonah Forbes	Assistant coach: Dalton Hinds	Assistant coach: Julie Seymour	Assistant coach: Erin Burger	Assistant coach: Sarah Namuddu

== Match officials ==
Umpires

Umpire	Association
Justin Barnes	Australia
Gary Burgess	England
Tania Fink	New Zealand
Alison Harrison	Wales
Cory Nicholls	New Zealand
Kate Stephenson	England
Elizna Van den Berg	South Africa

== Round robin stage ==
=== Round 1 ===
5 November 2022	Australia	39–15	Jamaica
12:30 (NZDT)	Lucy Austin 19; Sophie Garbin 18; Sophie Dwyer 7 Georgie Horjus 3	Stats	Gezelle Allison 8 Romelda Aiken 4 Mischa Creary 3

5 November 2022	New Zealand	49–32	Uganda
13:15 (NZDT)	Aliyah Dunn 29; Georgia Heffernan 10; Tiana Metuarau 5 Filda Vui 5	Stats	Mary Cholhok 18; Shadiah Nassanga 11; Irene Eyaru 2 Christine Namulumba 1

5 November 2022	South Africa	32–26	England
14:00 (NZDT)	Zandre Smit 17; Nicholé Taljaard 8 Sammy Ngubane 7	Stats	Paige Reed 12; Emma Thacker 7 Lois Pearson 7

=== Round 2 ===
5 November 2022	Uganda	33–22	Jamaica
15:30 (NZDT)	Mary Cholhok 18; Shadiah Nassanga 11; Irene Eyaru 2 Christine Namulumba 1	Stats	Amanda Pinkney 15; Romelda Aiken 6 Gezelle Allison 1

5 November 2022	Australia	25–19	South Africa
16:15 (NZDT)	Sophie Garbin 15; Lucy Austin 5 Sophie Dwyer 2 Georgie Horjus 3	Stats	Nicholé Taljaard 8 Sammy Ngubane 7 Zandre Smit 2 Xandri Fourie 2

5 November 2022	New Zealand	31–32	England
17:45 (NZDT)	Aliyah Dunn 12; Georgia Heffernan 12; Tiana Metuarau 7	Stats	Paige Reed 16; Emma Thacker 11; Lois Pearson 5

=== Round 3 ===
5 November 2022	South Africa	28–27	Jamaica
19:15 (NZDT)	Sammy Ngubane 11; Zandre Smit 10; Nicholé Taljaard 7	Stats	Amanda Pinkney 20; Mischa Creary 7

5 November 2022	England	38–34	Uganda
20:00 (NZDT)	Paige Reed 32; Lois Pearson 6	Stats	Mary Cholhok 29; Irene Eyaru 3 Shadiah Nassanga 2

5 November 2022	New Zealand	31–33	Australia
20:45 (NZDT)	Filda Vui 17; Tiana Metuarau 8 Aliyah Dunn 3 Georgia Heffernan 3	Stats	Sophie Garbin 17; Lucy Austin 6 Sophie Dwyer 5 Georgie Horjus 5

=== Round 4 ===
6 November 2022	England	32–27	Jamaica
12:00 (NZDT)	Emma Thacker 11; Lois Pearson 11; Paige Reed 10	Stats	Amanda Pinkney 15; Gezelle Allison 7 Mischa Creary 5

6 November 2022	Uganda	32–30	Australia
12:45 (NZDT)	Mary Cholhok 15; Shadiah Nassanga 14; Irene Eyaru 3	Stats	Sophie Garbin 15; Lucy Austin 6 Georgie Horjus 5 Sophie Dwyer 4

6 November 2022	New Zealand	37–38	South Africa
13:30 (NZDT)	Aliyah Dunn 25; Georgia Heffernan 8 Tiana Metuarau 3 Filda Vui 1	Stats	Zandre Smit 16; Nicholé Taljaard 13; Sammy Ngubane 9

=== Round 5 ===
6 November 2022	Australia	34–28	England
15:00 (NZDT)	Sophie Garbin 24; Georgie Horjus 4 Sophie Dwyer 4 Lucy Austin 2	Stats	Paige Reed 19; Emma Thacker 7 Lois Pearson 2

6 November 2022	New Zealand	40–22	Jamaica
15:45 (NZDT)	Aliyah Dunn 19; Tiana Metuarau 16; Georgia Heffernan 5	Stats	Amanda Pinkney 15; Gezelle Allison 4 Mischa Creary 3

6 November 2022	South Africa	27–22	Uganda
16:30 (NZDT)	Nicholé Taljaard 15; Sammy Ngubane 7 Zandre Smit 5	Stats	Mary Cholhok 9 Shadiah Nassanga 7 Christine Namulumba 4 Irene Eyaru 2

=== Table ===
Pos	Team	P	W	D	L	GF	GA	GD	Pts
1	Australia	5	4	0	1	161	125	+36	8
2	South Africa	5	4	0	1	141	139	+3	8
3	England	5	3	0	2	156	158	-2	6
4	New Zealand	5	2	0	3	188	157	+31	4
5	Uganda	5	2	0	3	153	166	-13	4
6	Jamaica	5	0	0	5	113	172	-59	0

Qualified for the final
Qualified for 3rd/4th place match
Qualified for 5th/6th place match

== Playoffs ==
=== 5th v 6th Playoff ===
6 November 2022	Uganda	32–10	Jamaica
18:10 (NZDT)	Christine Namulumba 14; Irene Eyaru 8 Mary Cholhok 6 Shadiah Nassanga 4	Stats	Amanda Pinkney 3 Gezelle Allison 2 Mischa Creary 2 Roxonna McLean 2 Romelda Aiken 1

=== 3rd v 4th Playoff ===
6 November 2022	New Zealand	39–25	England
19:00 (NZDT)	Aliyah Dunn 19; Georgia Heffernan 14; Tiana Metuarau 6		Emma Thacker 11; Lois Pearson 6 Paige Reed 4 Alicia Scholes 4

=== Final ===
6 November 2022	Australia	34–20	South Africa
19:50 (NZDT)	Sophie Garbin 24; Sophie Dwyer 7 Georgie Horjus 3	Stats	Sammy Ngubane 13; Nicholé Taljaard 4 Zandre Smit 2 Xandri Fourie 1

== Award winners ==
Award	Winner	Team
Player of the Series	Nicholé Taljaard	South Africa
Fans’ Choice Player of the Series	Mary Cholhok	Uganda

== Top scorers ==
	Player	Goals	Team
Most 1pt goals	Sophie Garbin	82/90 (91%)	Australia
Most 2pt goals	Aliyah Dunn	25/39 (64%)	New Zealand
Most 3pt goals	Amanda Pinkney	5/25 (20%)	Jamaica

== Final Placings ==
Rank	Team
1st place, gold medalist(s)	Australia
2nd place, silver medalist(s)	South Africa
3rd place, bronze medalist(s)	New Zealand
4	England
5	Uganda
6	Jamaica
