= Africa Netball Cup =

Netball competition

- Sport: Netball
- Founded: 2010
- Administrator: Africa Netball
- Most recent champion: Women: South Africa Men: South Africa (2025)
- Most titles: Women: South Africa (4 titles) Men: South Africa (2 titles)

The Africa Netball Cup, formerly known as the African Netball Championships, is an international netball competition held every two years organised by Africa Netball. The first edition of the tournament was held in 2010.

In 2023, the men's edition was introduced.

== Results ==
=== Women's results ===
Year	1st	2nd	3rd	Venue	Number of teams
2010	Malawi			Legon, Ghana	10
2012	Malawi	Tanzania	Zambia	Dar es Salaam, Tanzania	6
2013	South Africa	Malawi		Blantyre, Malawi	8
2014	Uganda	Zambia	Botswana	Gaborone, Botswana	6
2015	Zimbabwe			Gaborone, Botswana	
2017	Uganda	Malawi	Zimbabwe	Kampala, Uganda	6
2018	Uganda	Zimbabwe		Lusaka, Zambia	12
2019	South Africa	Malawi	Uganda	Cape Town, South Africa	7
2021	South Africa	Uganda	Malawi	Windhoek, Namibia	9
2023	Zambia	Namibia	Zimbabwe	Gaborone, Botswana	6
2025	South Africa	Uganda	Zimbabwe	Lilongwe, Malawi	8

==== Participating teams ====
Nation	2010	2012	2013	2014	2015	2017	2018	2019	2021	2023	2025	Total
Botswana	?	4th	7th	3	?	5th	5th	-	?	4th	6th	10
Burundi	-	-	-	-	-	-	?	-	-	-	-	1
Eswatini	?	-	7th	5th	?	-	-	-	-	6th	-	5
Ghana	?	-	-	-	-	-	-	-	-	-	-	1
Kenya	?	-	-	-	-	-	7th	?	?	5th	5th	6
Lesotho	?	6th	-	-	-	-	?	?	-	-	-	4
Malawi	1	1	2	-	-	2	2	2	3	-	4th	8
Namibia	?	-	5th	6th	-	6th	6th	-	?	2	7th	8
Seychelles	-	-	-	-	-	-	?	-	-	-	-	1
South Africa	-	-	1	-	-	-	?	1	1	-	1	5
Tanzania	?	2	-	-	?	-	?	-	?	-	8th	6
Uganda	-	-	3	1	-	1	1	3	2	-	2	7
Zambia	-	3	3	2	?	4th	4th	?	?	1	-	9
Zimbabwe	-	5th	5th	4th	1	3	3	?	?	3	3	10
Total teams	10 (?)	6	8	6	5 (?)	6	12	7	9	6	8	

=== Men's results ===
Year	1st	2nd	3rd	Venue	Number of teams
2023	South Africa	Zimbabwe	Kenya	Gaborone, Botswana	4
2025	South Africa	Zimbabwe	Eswatini	Lilongwe, Malawi	7
