= 2025 Netball World Youth Cup qualification – Africa =

International netball tournament

Tournament details
- Host country: South Africa
- City: City of Tshwane
- Venue: 1
- Dates: 16–23 March 2024
- Teams: 7

Final positions
- Champions: South Africa
- Runners-up: Malawi
- Third place: Zambia

The 2025 Netball World Youth Cup qualification – Africa organised by Africa Netball was the latest edition in the international competition to determine the youth national teams that will represent Africa at the 2025 Netball World Youth Cup. The competition was hosted by the City of Tshwane from 16 March 2024 to 23 March 2024 at the University of Pretoria.

South Africa, Malawi, and Zambia qualified for the 2025 Netball World Youth Cup.

== Teams ==
Seven teams contested the 2024 tournament with only three teams set to qualify for the 2025 Netball World Youth Cup.

- South Africa (host nation)
- Zambia
- Zimbabwe
- Namibia
- Malawi
- Kenya
- Tanzania

== Round robin stage ==
Pos	Team	Pld	W	D	L	GF	GA	GD	Pts
1	South Africa	6	6	0	0	384	107	277	12
2	Malawi	6	5	0	1	269	206	63	10
3	Zimbabwe	6	3	3	0	268	242	26	6
4	Zambia	6	3	3	0	231	256	−25	6
5	Namibia	6	2	1	3	233	259	−26	5
6	Kenya	6	1	1	4	214	282	−68	3
7	Tanzania	6	0	0	6	105	352	−247	0

=== Match Day 1 ===
17 March	South Africa	75-7	Tanzania	Rembrandt Hall

17 March	Kenya	39-49	Zimbabwe	Rembrandt Hall

17 March	Malawi	43-29	Namibia	Rembrandt Hall

17 March	South Africa	72-9	Zambia	Rembrandt Hall

=== Match Day 2 ===
18 March	Namibia	55-17	Tanzania	Rembrandt Hall

18 March	Zambia	37-42	Zimbabwe	Rembrandt Hall

18 March	Zimbabwe	28-62	South Africa	Rembrandt Hall

18 March	Tanzania	15-52	Zambia	Rembrandt Hall

=== Match Day 3 ===
19 March	South Africa	70-17	Kenya	Rembrandt Hall

19 March	Malawi	64-24	Tanzania	Rembrandt Hall

19 March	Kenya	39-42	Malawi	Rembrandt Hall

19 March	Zimbabwe	44-45	Namibia	Rembrandt Hall

=== Match Day 4 ===
20 March	Tanzania	17-62	Zimbabwe	Rembrandt Hall

20 March	Zambia	52-32	Kenya	Rembrandt Hall

20 March	South Africa	44-19	Malawi	Rembrandt Hall

=== Match Day 5 ===
21 March	South Africa	61-25	Namibia	Rembrandt Hall

21 March	Zambia	35-54	Malawi	Rembrandt Hall

21 March	Namibia	44-44	Kenya	Rembrandt Hall

=== Match Day 6 ===
22 March	Namibia	41-45	Zambia	Rembrandt Hall

22 March	Kenya	44-25	Tanzania	Rembrandt Hall

22 March	Malawi	42-41	Zimbabwe	Rembrandt Hall

== Playoffs ==
=== 5/6 Playoffs ===
23 March; 12:00 (CAT)	Kenya	50-42	Namibia	Rembrandt Hall

=== 3/4 Playoffs ===
23 March; 14:00 (CAT)	Zambia	43-41	Zimbabwe	Rembrandt Hall

=== Final ===
23 March; 16:00 (CAT)	South Africa	45-26	Malawi	Rembrandt Hall

== Final standings ==
The top three teams qualified for the 2025 Netball World Youth Cup.

Rank	Team
1	South Africa
2	Malawi
3	Zambia
4	Zimbabwe
5	Kenya
6	Namibia
7	Tanzania

== Awards ==
These were the award category winners:

Award	Winner
Disciplined Team	Zambia
Promising Player	Harriet Muchuma
Best Shooter	(South Africa) Thandazile Ndlovu
Best Mid Court	(South Africa) Phophi Nematangari
Best Defender	(South Africa) Sanmarie Visser
Player of the Tournament	(South Africa) Karla Victor
