= Norah Lunkuse =

Ugandan netball player

Personal information
- Full name: Norah Lunkuse
- Born: 30 January 1998 (age 28) Kampala, Central Region, Uganda
- Occupation: Netball player
- Height: 1.74 m (5 ft 9 in)
- Relative: Margret Baagala

Netball career
- Playing position: WA
2019– Present	KCCA Netball Club	
Years	National team	Caps
2022–2023	Uganda She-Cranes	

Norah Lunkuse aka Noki (born 30 January 1998) is a Ugandan netball player who plays for Kampala Capital City Authority Netball Club ( KCCA NC ) as a Wing Attack (WA).

== Early life and educational background ==
Lunkuse was born in Kawaala [Kampala Suburb] to George William Kivumbi and Late Nakachwa Betty. She studied at Kawaala Primary School, where she sat for her Primary Leaving Examinations in 2011. She then joined St. Mary's Boarding Secondary School, Kitende for her secondary education from 2012 to 2017.

== Club career ==
Norah Lunkuse started her netball career at Kawaala Primary School, inspired by England's international netball star Serena Guthrie and the school's head teacher, Gerald Mukuye. In 2012, She joined St. Mary's Boarding Secondary School netball team, Kitende, where she won six national championships and six East African titles. In 2019, Lunkuse joined KCCA Netball Club, where she earned the nickname “Picasso of the midfield.”

== National career ==
Lunkuse was included in the Uganda She Cranes squad for the 2019 Africa Netball Championships which were held in Cape Town, South Africa from 18 to 23 October 2019. She was part of the She Cranes squad that won the gold medal at the Pent Series held from October 30 to November 6, 2021, in Namibia.

Lunkuse was part of the Uganda She Cranes squad for the 2022 Commonwealth Games, which were held in Birmingham, England, from July 28 to August 8, 2022, where she played as a Wing Attack (WA). She was also part of the Uganda She Cranes squad that competed in the 2023 Netball World Cup, held in Cape Town, South Africa, from July 28 to August 6, 2023.

== Achievements and awards ==
Lunkuse won the 2012, 2013, 2014, 2015, 2016 and 2017 National Netball Championships (Uganda Schools Championships) with St. Mary's Boarding Secondary School netball team, Kitende. She also won the 2012, 2013, 2014, 2015, 2016 and 2017 East African Schools Netball Championships with St. Mary's Boarding Secondary School netball team, Kitende.

Won a gold medal as part of the She Cranes squad at the 2021 Pent Series in Namibia.

Awarded the Best Wing Attacker (WA) title for the 2021/22 Uganda Netball Premier League season.

In 2022, She was selected as a Wing Attack (WA) in the Uganda Netball Federation (UNF) Women's Team of the Season.

== See also ==
- Serena Guthrie
- Peace Proscovia
- Stella Oyella
- Margret Baagala
