= Netball in Namibia =

- Country: Namibia
- National team: Namibia

Netball in Namibia is a popular sport, played at the national level.

== International Competition ==
Namibia competed in the annual Confederation of Southern African Netball Associations (COSANA) tournament in 2008.

The 2010 Nations Cup, called NTUC FairPrice Foundation Nations Cup 2010, was held in December. Namibia beat India 72–32 to capture fifth.

As of January 2011, the women's national team was ranked number twenty-four in the world.

== Bibliography ==
- DaCosta, Lamartine P.; Miragaya, Ana (2002). Worldwide experiences and trends in sport for all. Meyer & Meyer Sport. ISBN 1-84126-085-1. OCLC 248362122.
- International Federation of Netball Associations (21 January 2011a). "Current World Rankings". Archived from the original on 19 May 2011.
- Netball Singapore (2011b). "Milestones". Archived from the original on 18 February 2011.
- Netball Singapore (13 December 2010a). "NTUC FairPrice Foundation Nations Cup 2010". Archived from the original on 6 March 2011.
- Nyasa Times (10 April 2008). "Malawi U-21 netball in Lesotho for Cosana". Nyasa Times. Archived from the original on 7 March 2011.
