= Africa Netball =

Governing body of netball in Africa

- Region: Africa
- www.netball.org/africa-region

Africa Netball, previously known as the Confederation of African Netball Associations, is the regional body within the World Netball that governs netball in Africa. There are currently fifteen full members within the African region.

== Members ==
Full Members

Team	Association
Botswana	Botswana Netball Association
Burundi	
Eswatini	Netball Eswatini
Kenya	Kenya Netball Association
Ivory Coast	
Lesotho	Netball Association of Lesotho
Malawi	Netball Association of Malawi
Namibia	Netball Namibia
South Africa	Netball South Africa
Tanzania	Netball Association of Tanzania
Uganda	Uganda Netball Federation
Zambia	Netball Association of Zambia
Zimbabwe	Zimbabwe Netball Association

Associate Members

Team	Association
(Democratic Republic of the Congo) DR Congo	
Liberia	
Seychelles	

Other netball nations

Team	Association
Angola	
Egypt	
Ethiopia	
Mauritius	
Nigeria	
Senegal	
Sierra Leone	
