= 2020 Netball Nations Cup =

International netball tournament

Tournament details
- Host country: England
- Cities: Nottingham; Birmingham; London
- Venue(s): Motorpoint Arena; Arena Birmingham; Copper Box Arena
- Dates: 19–26 January 2020
- Teams: 4
- TV partner(s): Sky Sports (UK/Ireland); SuperSport (South Africa)

Final positions
- Champions: New Zealand (2nd title)
- Runners-up: Jamaica
- Third place: England

Tournament statistics
- Matches played: 8

The 2020 Vitality Netball Nations Cup was an international netball tournament. It was hosted by England Netball. It featured England, Jamaica, New Zealand and South Africa playing each other in a series of eight netball test matches in January 2020. The tournament effectively replaced the Netball Quad Series for 2020. Australia opted out of taking part and were subsequently replaced by Jamaica. Round 1 was hosted at Nottingham's Motorpoint Arena, Round 2 was hosted at Arena Birmingham while the final four matches were hosted at London's Copper Box Arena.

With a team coached by Noeline Taurua and captained by Ameliaranne Ekenasio, New Zealand won the tournament, winning all four of their matches and defeating Jamaica 67–56 in the final. The series was broadcast live on Sky Sports and Sky Sports YouTube in the United Kingdom and Ireland and on SuperSport (South Africa).

== Squads ==
Participating teams and rosters
England	Jamaica	New Zealand	South Africa
Amy Carter; Eleanor Cardwell; Jade Clarke; Kadeen Corbin; Sophie Drakeford-Lewis; George Fisher; Stacey Francis; Natalie Haythornthwaite (c); Laura Malcolm (vc); Natalie Panagarry; Chelsea Pitman; Razia Quashie; Kate Shimmin; Fran Williams	Gezelle Allison; Shanice Beckford; Kadie-Ann Dehaney; Nicole Dixon; Jhaniele Fowler (c); Shadian Hemmings; Shannika Johnson; Shamera Sterling; Shimona Nelson; Jodi-Ann Ward; Khadijah Williams; Latanya Wilson	Karin Burger; Gina Crampton (vc); Ameliaranne Ekenasio (c); Phoenix Karaka; Bailey Mes; Kimiora Poi; Michaela Sokolich-Beatson; Shannon Saunders; Te Paea Selby-Rickit; Whitney Souness; Jane Watson (vc); Maia Wilson	Sigrid Burger; Khanyisa Chawane; Rome Dreyer; Izette Griesel; Phumza Maweni; Bongiwe Msomi (c); Lenize Potgieter; Karla Pretorius (vc); Lefébre Rademan; Shadine van der Merwe; Ine-Marí Venter; Zanele Vimbela
Coach: Jess Thirlby	Coach: Connie Francis	Coach: Noeline Taurua	Coach: Dorette Badenhorst

== Debuts ==
- On 19 January 2020, Amy Carter made her senior debut for England against New Zealand.

== Match officials ==
Umpires

Umpire	Association
Gary Burgess	England
Jonathan Bredin	New Zealand
Jemma Cook	Australia
Anso Kemp	South Africa
Kate Stephenson	England
Tara Warner	Australia

== Round robin stage ==
=== Round 1 ===
19 January 2020	Jamaica	59–54	South Africa	Motorpoint Arena
14:30	Jhaniele Fowler 47/48 (98%); Shanice Beckford 11/14 (79%); Shimona Nelson 1/1 (100%)		Lenize Potgieter 30/31 (97%); Ine-Marí Venter 21/23 (91%); Lefébre Rademan 3/5 (60%)

19 January 2020	England	48–64	New Zealand	Motorpoint Arena
17:00	Eleanor Cardwell 25/31 (81%); George Fisher 21/22 (95%); Kadeen Corbin 2/5 (40%)	Stats	Maia Wilson 26/28 (93%); Te Paea Selby-Rickit 14/16 (88%); Ameliaranne Ekenasio 12/12 (100%); Bailey Mes 12/13 (92%)

=== Round 2 ===
22 January 2020	New Zealand	71–45	Jamaica	Arena Birmingham
17:30	Maia Wilson 42/45 (93%); Ameliaranne Ekenasio 18/22 (82%); Te Paea Selby-Rickit 11/13 (85%)	Stats	Jhaniele Fowler 38/40 (95%); Shanice Beckford 7/8 (88%)

22 January 2020	England	58–54	South Africa	Arena Birmingham
20:00

=== Round 3 ===
25 January 2020	New Zealand	48–41	South Africa	Copper Box Arena
14:30	Maia Wilson 24/30 (80%); Ameliaranne Ekenasio 15/18 (83%); Te Paea Selby-Rickit 1/1 (100%)		Ine-Marí Venter 24/29 (83%); Lenize Potgieter 11/15 (73%); Lefébre Rademan 6/10 (60%)

25 January 2020	England	66–70	Jamaica	Copper Box Arena
17:00	Eleanor Cardwell 46/50 (92%); George Fisher 11/12 (92%); Kadeen Corbin 5/5 (100%); Natalie Haythornthwaite 4/8 (50%)		Jhaniele Fowler 61/64 (95%); Shanice Beckford 8/8 (100%); Shimona Nelson 1/1 (100%)

=== Table ===
Pos	Team	P	W	L	GF	GA	GD	Pts
1	New Zealand	3	3	0	183	134	+49	6
2	Jamaica	3	2	1	174	191	-17	4
3	England	3	1	2	172	188	-16	2
4	South Africa	3	0	3	149	165	-16	0

Qualified for Final
Qualified for 3rd/4th place match

== Playoffs ==
=== 3rd v 4th Playoff ===
26 January 2020	England	65–63	South Africa	Copper Box Arena
14:30

=== Final ===
26 January 2020	New Zealand	67–56	Jamaica	Copper Box Arena
17:00	Maia Wilson 30/37 (81%); Ameliaranne Ekenasio 22/28 (79%); Te Paea Selby-Rickit 1/1 (100%)	Stats	Jhaniele Fowler 46/47 (98%); Shanice Beckford 10/11 (91%)

== Final Placings ==
Rank	Team
1st place, gold medalist(s)	New Zealand
2nd place, silver medalist(s)	Jamaica
3rd place, bronze medalist(s)	England
4	South Africa
