= Ben Mary Muwanga =

Ugandan netball coach

- Born: Kibibi, Butambala Uganda
- Education: Mitala Maria Primary School; Mount Saint Mary's College Namagunga; Nkozi Teacher Training College.
- Occupations: trained teacher and qualified coach in netball, handball, basketball and athletics
- Known for: leading the She Cranes to the 1979 World Netball Tournament
- Children: 2

Ben Mary Muwanga (sometimes referred to as Benny Muwanga or Mary Ben Muwanga is a Ugandan netball coach most notable for leading the She Cranes to the 1979 World Netball Tournament. She was also the national team coach between 1975 - 1985.

== Background and education ==
Ben Mary Muwanga was born in Kibibi, Butambala in 1943 to Erisa Muwanga and Julian Nanyanzi. Ben Mary Muwanga is a trained teacher and studied at Mitala Maria Primary School and Mount Saint Mary's College Namagunga before proceeding to Nkozi Teacher Training College.

== Netball career ==
She started playing the sport while in school at Mount Saint Mary's College Namagunga, and later signed for Kampala Women's Club. By her own admission, she joined the She Cranes as a player in 1964 and played one year with the national team. After completing coaching courses in 1969, she was appointed assistant coach for the She Cranes, deputizing Miriam Kibirango.

Upon being appointed She Cranes head coach in 1975, she guided the team to win 3 CECAFA Netball titles in 1975, 1981 and 1982. She also served as the team manager and Assistant Secretary to the Uganda Netball Federation. She retired from her post as She Cranes Head Coach in 1985 and then worked as an assistant Sports Officer for Mukono District till 2004.

=== Other sports ===
In addition to being a netball coach and player, Mary Ben is also a qualified coach in netball, handball, basketball and athletics.

== Personal life ==
As of 2013, it was reported that she had 2 children, a son and a daughter. She lives in the Kampala suburb of Kabowa.

== See also ==
- Peninah Kabenge
- Florence Nkalubo
- Allan Munaaba
- Rashid Mubiru
