= 2019 South Africa England netball series =

Tournament details
- Host country: South Africa
- Dates: 29 November–1 December 2019

Final positions
- Champions: England
- Runners-up: South Africa

Tournament statistics
- Matches played: 3

The 2019 South Africa England netball series saw South Africa host England in November and December 2019 for a three-match series. The series was Jess Thirlby's first as new coach of the England team and was also Dorette Badenhorst's first home series as the new South African coach.

== Squads ==
South Africa vs. England
South Africa	England
Ine-Marí Venter; Lenize Potgieter; Renske Stoltz; Lefébre Rademan; Sigi Burger; Bongi Msomi (c); Izette Griesel; Romé Dreyer; Khanyisa Chawane; Kgomotso Itlhabanyeng; Phumza Maweni; Shadine van der Merwe; Zanele Vimbela; Monique Reyneke; Precious Mthembu	George Fisher; Eleanor Cardwell; Kadeen Corbin; Sophie Drakeford-Lewis; Natalie Haythornthwaite (c); Jade Clarke; Laura Malcolm; Natalie Panagarry; Stacey Francis; Kate Shimmin; Razia Quashie; Fran Williams; Gabriella Marshall; Summer Artman

== Matches ==
=== First test ===
29 November 2019; 5:00 pm	Report; Stats	South Africa	58–63 (A.E.T.)	England	Bellville Velodrome, Cape Town	SuperSport & Sky Sports
29 November 2019; 5:00 pm	Report; Stats	Potgieter 48/51 (94%); Rademan 7/9 (78%); Stoltz 3/5 (60%)		Cardwell 52/62 (84%); Corbin 8/12 (67%); Haythornthwaite 3/4 (75%)	Bellville Velodrome, Cape Town	SuperSport & Sky Sports

=== Second test ===
30 November 2019; 5:00 pm	Report; Stats	South Africa	53–59	England	Bellville Velodrome, Cape Town	SuperSport & Sky Sports
30 November 2019; 5:00 pm	Report; Stats	Burger 25/26 (96%); Potgieter 23/25 (92%); Rademan 3/4 (75%); Venter 2/2 (100%)		Cardwell 21/22 (95%); Fisher 23/28 (82%); Corbin 15/17 (88%)	Bellville Velodrome, Cape Town	SuperSport & Sky Sports

=== Third test ===
1 December 2019; 5:00 pm	Report	South Africa	54–48	England	Bellville Velodrome, Cape Town	SuperSport & Sky Sports
