= 2024 Pacific Netball Series =

Pacific Netball event that occurred in 2014

Netball at the 2024 Pacific Netball Series
- Location: Australia
- Dates: 10–15 June 2014

The 2024 Pacific Netball series was held in Brisbane Australia between 10 and 15 June 2024.

The tournament was won by Tonga over Fiji. Even though the Indigenous Australia team topped the table, they were ineligible to play in the Grand Final as they are not an official International team. Finishing third was invited guest Namibia.

== Results ==
=== Table ===
Team	P	W	D	L	GF	GA	GD	PTS
First Nations Australia	5	4	0	1	277	233	44	8
Tonga	5	4	0	1	310	279	31	8
Fiji	5	3	0	2	308	289	19	6
Namibia	5	2	0	3	257	262	-5	4
Samoa	5	2	0	3	262	286	-24	4
Singapore	5	0	0	5	250	315	-65	0

=== Pool rounds ===
10 June 2024; 15:00	Report	Fiji	67 - 52	Singapore	Queensland State Netball Centre

17:00	Report	Samoa	55 - 47	Namibia	Queensland State Netball Centre

19:00	Report	First Nations Australia	50 - 62	Tonga	Queensland State Netball Centre

11 June 2024; 15:00	Report	Samoa	55 - 64	Fiji	Queensland State Netball Centre

17:00	Report	Singapore	50 - 62	First Nations Australia	Queensland State Netball Centre

19:00	Report	Namibia	54 - 51	Tonga	Queensland State Netball Centre

12 June 2024; 15:00	Report	First Nations Australia	61 - 48	Fiji	Queensland State Netball Centre

17:00	Report	Singapore	45 - 58	Namibia	Queensland State Netball Centre

19:00	Report	Tonga	70 - 55	Samoa	Queensland State Netball Centre

13 June 2024; 15:00	Report	Namibia	41 - 45	First Nations Australia	Queensland State Netball Centre

17:00	Report	Singapore	46 - 65	Samoa	Queensland State Netball Centre

19:00	Report	Fiji	63 - 64	Tonga	Queensland State Netball Centre

14 June 2024; 15:00	Report	Samoa	32 - 59	First Nations Australia	Queensland State Netball Centre

17:00	Report	Singapore	57 - 63	Tonga	Queensland State Netball Centre

19:00	Report	Fiji	66 - 57	Namibia	Queensland State Netball Centre

=== Finals ===
15 June 2024; 15:00	Report	First Nations Australia	50 - 52	Singapore	Queensland State Netball Centre

17:00	Report	Namibia	54 - 36	Samoa	Queensland State Netball Centre

19:00	Report	Tonga	72 - 58	Fiji	Queensland State Netball Centre

== Final standings ==
Place	Nation
Gold	Tonga
Silver	Fiji
Bronze	Namibia
4	Samoa
5	Singapore
NE	First Nations Australia

== See also ==
- Pacific Netball Series
