= Betty Kizza =

Ugandan netball player (born 1996)

Personal information
- Born: October 23, 1996 (age 29) Mukono, Uganda
- Occupation: netball player
- Height: 1.71 m (5 ft 7 1/2 in)

Netball career
- Playing position: center
Medal record
Representing Uganda
World University Netball Championship
Gold medal – first place	2018 Kampala	Team

Betty Kizza (born 23 October 1996) is an Ugandan netball player who represents Uganda internationally and plays in the center position. She has represented Uganda at the 2018 Commonwealth Games and at the 2019 Netball World Cup.

In September 2019, she was included in the Ugandan squad for the 2019 African Netball Championships.
