= Pacific Netball Series =

Yearly netball competition played by the top 4 non elite teams in world ranking

The Pacific Netball Series is an annual netball competition organised by the Oceania Netball Federation. This is played by the top four non elite teams in the INF World Rankings.

The first competition was hosted by Samoa in 2009. Cook Islands won the inaugural tournament with hosts Samoa second. Papua New Guinea was third. Fiji pulled out of the event.

The second competition was held in the Cook Islands in 2010. Fiji were the winners over Samoa. Hosts Cook Islands took third with Papua New Guinea fourth.

The third competition was held in Papua New Guinea in 2011. Fiji again were the winners over Cook Islands. Samoa took third with hosts Papua New Guinea fourth.

== Results ==
Year	Venue	Final			
Year	Venue	Winner	Runner-up	3rd Place	4th Place
2009	Samoa	Cook Islands	Samoa	Papua New Guinea	only three teams
2010	Cook Islands	Fiji	Samoa	Cook Islands	Papua New Guinea
2011	Papua New Guinea	Fiji	Cook Islands	Samoa	Papua New Guinea
2012	Fiji	?	?	?	?
2013	Samoa	Fiji	Papua New Guinea	Samoa	Cook Islands
2014	Cook Islands	Fiji	Samoa	Papua New Guinea	Cook Islands
2018	New Zealand	Fiji	Samoa	?	?
2022	Fiji	Tonga	Fiji	Samoa	Papua New Guinea
2024	Australia	Tonga	Fiji	Namibia	Samoa

== See also ==
- Oceania Netball Federation
