= Ruth Meeme =

Ugandan netball player (born 1990)

Personal information
- Born: January 22, 1990 (age 36) Mulago, Uganda
- Occupation: netball player
- Height: 1.65 m (5 ft 5 in)

Netball career
- Playing position: wing attack

Ruth Meeme (born 22 January 1990) is an Ugandan netball player who represents Uganda internationally and plays in the position of wing attack. She has represented Uganda at the 2011 All-Africa Games 2018 Commonwealth Games and also competed at two World Cup tournaments in 2015 and in 2019.

She was a key member of the Ugandan side which claimed a gold medal in the Netball at the 2011 All-Africa Games.

In September 2019, she was included in the Ugandan squad for the 2019 African Netball Championships.

On 11th Jan 2025, Ruth Meeme became the She Cranes Assistant Coach
