= Rashid Mubiru =

Rashid Mubiru is a Ugandan netball coach heading the She Cranes, the Uganda national netball team.

== Career ==
Mubiru has led the She Cranes as head coach during the 2015 Netball World Cup and the 2025 Netball Nations Cup.

He also led the She Cranes to the international test series tournament in Cape Town, South Africa. The She Cranes participated in the 2024 Africa Netball Cup and won the silver medal.

Mubiru was named as the new coach for the She Cranes national Netball team in January 2025, and leads the national team in compliance with Uganda national sports governing body, the Ministry of Education and Sports and monitored by the Uganda Netball Federation.

== See also ==
- Ben Mary Muwanga
- Halima Nakachwa
- Nasiimu Mutesi
