= Irene Eyaru =

Ugandan netball player (born 1996)

Personal information
- Born: October 23, 1996 (age 30)
- Occupation: netball player

Netball career
- Playing position: goal attack
Medal record
Representing Uganda
World University Netball Championship
Gold medal – first place	2018 Kampala	Team

Irene Eyaru (born 23 October 1996) is a Ugandan netball player who represents Uganda internationally and plays in the position of goal attack. Since 2025, she has been the national captain of the Ugandan national netball team.

== Career ==
She made her international debut representing Uganda in 2015. She has been playing for KCCA Netball Club since 2014 and has also went onto captain the club. She was a key player in Uganda's historic gold medal-winning performance against South Africa at the 2018 World Netball University Games where hosts Uganda prevailed against South Africa under her leadership in a thrilling nail-biting entertainer winning it 44–43 in the end by the barest of all margins.

She was named in the Ugandan squad for the 2021 SPAR Challenge Series which was held in South Africa and she eventually won the Best Shooter's plaque during the competition. She was also part of the Ugandan team which took part at the 2022 Fast5 Netball World Series. She represented Uganda at the 2022 Commonwealth Games where Uganda finished at fifth position.

She replaced Peace Proscovia as the captain of Uganda just ahead of the 2023 Netball World Cup. She made her maiden appearance at a Netball World Cup tournament when South Africa hosted the 2023 Netball World Cup. She eventually captained the Ugandan national team during the 2023 Netball World Cup.

== See also ==
- Faridah Kadondi
- Margaret Baagala
- Sandra Nambirige
- Sarah Nakiyunga
