= Netball Singapore Nations Cup =

Netball tournament

- Founded: 2006
- Administrator: Netball Singapore
- No. of teams: 4-6
- Most recent champion: Kenya (2nd Title)
- Most titles: Singapore (3 titles)

The Netball Singapore Nations Cup is an annual netball tournament organised and hosted by Netball Singapore. The inaugural tournament was played in 2006 and was won by Singapore. The host nation is the tournament's most successful team, winning three tournaments.

The tournament was not held between 2020–2021 due to the COVID-19 pandemic.

In 2025, Kenya became the only other country to win back-to-back Nations Cup titles after Singapore in 2006 & 2007.

== Tournaments ==
	1st place, gold medalist(s)	2nd place, silver medalist(s)	3rd place, bronze medalist(s)	4th	5th	6th
2006	Singapore	Papua New Guinea	Scotland	Canada	n/a	n/a
2007	Singapore	Trinidad and Tobago	Northern Ireland	Sri Lanka	Canada	n/a
2008	Papua New Guinea	Botswana	Samoa	Sri Lanka	Singapore	n/a
2009	Northern Ireland	Scotland	Canada	Tanzania	Singapore	Malaysia
2010	Wales	Scotland	Tanzania	Singapore	Namibia	India
2011	Fiji	Singapore	Malaysia	Namibia	Sri Lanka	Papua New Guinea
2012	Tanzania	Malaysia	Namibia	Sri Lanka	Singapore	Republic of Ireland
2013	Uganda	Singapore	Papua New Guinea	Sri Lanka	Republic of Ireland	United States
2014	Samoa	Singapore	Botswana	Malaysia	Papua New Guinea	Republic of Ireland
2015	Northern Ireland	Papua New Guinea	Singapore	Botswana	Singapore Invitational	Chinese Taipei
2016	Zambia	Papua New Guinea	Botswana	Singapore	Republic of Ireland	Canada
2017	Cook Islands	Swaziland	Singapore	Republic of Ireland	Malaysia	Hong Kong
2019	Namibia	Singapore	Botswana	Cook Islands	Republic of Ireland	Papua New Guinea
2022	Botswana	Fiji	Singapore	Republic of Ireland	Malaysia	Singapore A
2023	Singapore	Papua New Guinea	Cook Islands	Canada	Singapore A	Sri Lanka
2024	Kenya	Singapore	United Arab Emirates	Republic of Ireland	Singapore A	Canada
2025	Kenya	Singapore	Papua New Guinea	Malaysia	Singapore A	Isle of Man

== Finals ==
	1st place, gold medalist(s)	Score	2nd place, silver medalist(s)	Venue
2006	Singapore	46–41	Papua New Guinea	Toa Payoh Sports Hall
2007	Singapore	56–32	Trinidad and Tobago	Toa Payoh Sports Hall
2008	Papua New Guinea	55–53	Botswana	Toa Payoh Sports Hall
2009	Northern Ireland	49–34	Scotland	Toa Payoh Sports Hall
2010	Wales	53–30	Scotland	Toa Payoh Sports Hall
2011	Fiji	51–42	Singapore	Toa Payoh Sports Hall
2012	Tanzania	45–38	Malaysia	Toa Payoh Sports Hall
2013	Uganda	52–29	Singapore	Toa Payoh Sports Hall
2014	Samoa	50–41	Singapore	OCBC Arena
2015	Northern Ireland	52–41	Papua New Guinea	OCBC Arena
2016	Zambia	65–49	Papua New Guinea	OCBC Arena
2017	Cook Islands	39–38	Swaziland	OCBC Arena
2019	Namibia	49–42	Singapore	OCBC Arena
2022	Botswana	65–37	Fiji	OCBC Arena
2023	Singapore	59–56	Papua New Guinea	OCBC Arena
2024	Kenya	61–33	Singapore	OCBC Arena
2025	Kenya	55–42	Singapore	OCBC Arena

== Winners by nation ==
Nation	Years
Singapore	2006, 2007, 2023
Kenya	2024, 2025
Northern Ireland	2009, 2015
Botswana	2022
Cook Islands	2017
Fiji	2011
Namibia	2019
Papua New Guinea	2008
Samoa	2014
Tanzania	2012
Uganda	2013
Wales	2010
Zambia	2016

== Main sponsors ==
	Seasons
Fisher & Paykel	2008
NTUC Fairprice Foundation	2010
Mission Foods	2015-2017
M1 Limited	2019
MiRXES	2023-2024
Singlife	2025
