= 2017 Netball World Youth Cup =

Netball tournament

Tournament details
- Host country: Botswana
- Dates: 8–16 July 2017
- Teams: 20

Final positions
- Champions: New Zealand (4th title)
- Runners-up: Australia
- Third place: England

The Netball World Youth Cup Gaborone 2017 was the eighth staging of the tournament previously (until 2013) known as the World Youth Netball Championships, the premier competition in international netball, contested every four years. The 2017 tournament, to be held from 8–16 July, held in Gaborone, Botswana, which is first African region country to host the tournament. Matches are to be played at University of Botswana Indoor Stadium and Ditshupo Hall. Twenty nations competed at the championships.

== Teams ==
=== Qualification ===
Twenty teams contested the 2017 tournament. The home nation automatically qualified, along with the next four highest-ranked teams from the 2013 World Youth Netball Championships:

- Botswana (host nation)
- New Zealand
- Australia
- Jamaica
- England

Qualification Tournaments The remaining fifteen teams were determined by regional qualifying tournaments, with three teams selected from each of the five international netball regions; Africa, Americas, Asia, Europe and Oceania.

Region	Host	Teams	Dates	Winners	Runners-up	2nd Runners- up
Asia	Hong Kong	12	14–20 December 2015	Sri Lanka	Malaysia	Singapore
Africa	Botswana	8	24–30 July 2016	South Africa	Zimbabwe	Uganda
Americas	Sint Maarten	7	22–28 August 2016	Barbados	Trinidad and Tobago	Grenada
Oceania	New Zealand	6	26–29 September 2016	Fiji	Cook Islands	Samoa
Europe	Wales	4	7–9 October 2016	Scotland	Wales	Northern Ireland

=== Draw ===
The draw for the tournament was held on 20 October 2016 at Botswana. The pools for the tournament's finals is as below:

Pool A	Pool B	Pool C	Pool D
New Zealand; Sri Lanka; Scotland; Northern Ireland; Samoa	Australia; South Africa; Barbados; Zimbabwe; Singapore	Jamaica; Botswana; Cook Islands; Malaysia; Uganda	England; Fiji; Trinidad and Tobago; Wales; Grenada

== Preliminary rounds ==
=== Pool A ===
Pos	Team	Pld	W	D	L	GF	GA	GR	Pts	Qualification	NZL	SCO	SAM	NIR	SRI
1	New Zealand	4	4	0	0	377	96	3.927	8	Advance to 1/8th placement playoff	—	78–26	85–33	89–22	125–15
2	Scotland	4	3	0	1	196	206	0.951	6	Advance to 1/8th placement playoff	26–78	—	46–44	55–36	69–48
3	Samoa	4	2	0	2	215	208	1.034	4		33–85	44–46	—	65–28	73–49
4	Northern Ireland	4	1	0	3	142	253	0.561	2		22–89	36–55	28–65	—	56–44
5	Sri Lanka	4	0	0	4	156	323	0.483	0		15–125	48–69	49–73	44–56	—

Source: Standing, Results

=== Pool B ===
Pos	Team	Pld	W	D	L	GF	GA	GR	Pts	Qualification	AUS	RSA	ZIM	BAR	SGP
1	Australia	4	4	0	0	363	113	3.212	8	Advance to 1/8th placement playoff	—	65–36	86–33	93–32	119–12
2	South Africa	4	3	0	1	228	159	1.434	6	Advance to 1/8th placement playoff	36–65	—	56–42	62–30	74–22
3	Zimbabwe	4	2	0	2	199	215	0.926	4		33–86	42–56	—	58–35	66–38
4	Barbados	4	1	0	3	165	257	0.642	2		32–93	30–62	35–58	—	68–44
5	Singapore	4	0	0	4	116	327	0.355	0		12–119	22–74	38–66	44–68	—

Source: Standing, Results

=== Pool C ===
Pos	Team	Pld	W	D	L	GF	GA	GR	Pts	Qualification	UGA	JAM	BOT	COK	MAS
1	Uganda	4	3	0	1	218	146	1.493	6	Advance to 1/8th placement playoff	—	39–44	46–42	52–39	81–21
2	Jamaica	4	3	0	1	203	150	1.353	6	Advance to 1/8th placement playoff	44–39	—	46–48	43–41	70–22
3	Botswana (H)	4	3	0	1	212	159	1.333	6		42–46	48–46	—	50–41	72–26
4	Cook Islands	4	0	1	3	166	190	0.874	1		39–52	41–43	41–50	—	45–45
5	Malaysia	4	0	1	3	114	268	0.425	1		21–81	22–70	26–72	45–45	—

Source: Standing, Results
(H) Hosts

=== Pool D ===
Pos	Team	Pld	W	D	L	GF	GA	GR	Pts	Qualification	ENG	FIJ	TRI	WAL	GRD
1	England	4	4	0	0	305	104	2.933	8	Advance to 1/8th placement playoff	—	63–29	75–27	69–23	98–25
2	Fiji	4	3	0	1	206	149	1.383	6	Advance to 1/8th placement playoff	29–63	—	55–28	48–35	74–23
3	Trinidad and Tobago	4	2	0	2	167	197	0.848	4		27–75	28–55	—	36–32	76–35
4	Wales	4	1	0	3	162	183	0.885	2		23–69	35–48	32–36	—	72–30
5	Grenada	4	0	0	4	113	320	0.353	0		25–98	23–74	35–76	30–72	—

Source: Standing, Results

== Playoff and placement ==
=== 17th to 20th place ===
Semi-finals
13 July
Malaysia	62
Grenada	49
13 July
Singapore	63
Sri Lanka	36

Crossover
14 July
Malaysia	57
Sri Lanka	53
14 July
Grenada	55
Singapore	68

Seventeenth place
15 July
Malaysia	64
Singapore	44
Nineteenth place
15 July
Sri Lanka	51
Grenada	48

=== 9th to 16th place ===
Thirteenth place
Wales	44
Trinidad and Tobago	43
Fifteenth place
Barbados	54
Northern Ireland	42

Consolation semifinals
Wales	47
Barbados	44
Northern Ireland	40
Trinidad and Tobago	51

Quarterfinals
Botswana	51
Wales	39
Samoa	54
Barbados	48
Northern Ireland	37
Zimbabwe	65
Trinidad and Tobago	31
Cook Islands	40

Semifinals
Botswana	45
Samoa	43
Zimbabwe	55
Cook Islands	41

Ninth place
Botswana	41
Zimbabwe	56
Eleventh place
Samoa	64
Cook Islands	37

=== 1st to 8th place ===
==== Bracket ====
Fifth place
South Africa	47
Jamaica	52
Seventh place
Uganda	55
Scotland	42

Consolation semifinals
South Africa	59
Uganda	35
Scotland	45
Jamaica	58

Quarterfinals
New Zealand	69
South Africa	32
Uganda	37
Fiji	39
Scotland	22
Australia	95
Jamaica	38
England	55

Semifinals
New Zealand	79
Fiji	28
Australia	59
England	39

Final
New Zealand	60
Australia	57
Third place
Fiji	35
England	70

==== Quarter-finals ====
13 July; 10:00 (CAT)	New Zealand	69–32	South Africa	University of Botswana Indoor Stadium

13 July; 12:00 (CAT)	Uganda	37–39	Fiji	University of Botswana Indoor Stadium

13 July; 14:00 (CAT)	Scotland	22–95	Australia	University of Botswana Indoor Stadium

13 July; 16:00 (CAT)	Jamaica	38–55	England	University of Botswana Indoor Stadium

==== Crossover ====
14 July; 12:00 (CAT)	South Africa	59–35	Uganda	University of Botswana Indoor Stadium

14 July; 10:00 (CAT)	Scotland	45–58	Jamaica	University of Botswana Indoor Stadium

==== Semi-finals ====
14 July; 16:00 (CAT)	New Zealand	79–28	Fiji	University of Botswana Indoor Stadium

14 July; 18:00 (CAT)	Australia	59–39	England	University of Botswana Indoor Stadium

==== 7th and 8th place ====
16 July; 10:00 (CAT)	Uganda	55–42	Scotland	University of Botswana Indoor Stadium

==== 5th and 6th place ====
16 July; 12:00 (CAT)	South Africa	47–52	Jamaica	University of Botswana Indoor Stadium

==== Bronze medal ====
16 July; 14:00 (CAT)	Fiji	35–70	England	University of Botswana Indoor Stadium

==== Gold medal ====
16 July; 16:00 (CAT)	New Zealand	60–57	Australia	University of Botswana Indoor Stadium

== Final rankings ==
Place	Nation
Gold	New Zealand
Silver	Australia
Bronze	England
4	Fiji
5	Jamaica
6	South Africa
7	Uganda
8	Scotland
9	Zimbabwe
10	Botswana
11	Samoa
12	Cook Islands
13	Wales
14	Trinidad and Tobago
15	Barbados
16	Northern Ireland
17	Malaysia
18	Singapore
19	Sri Lanka
20	Grenada
