= Laura Malcolm =

English netball player (born 1991)

Personal information
- Born: 20 May 1991 (age 35)
- Height: 1.75 m (5 ft 9 in)

Netball career
| Years | Club team | Apps |
| ?–2017 | Manchester Thunder | |
| 2017–2019 | Severn Stars | |
| 2019–2022 | Manchester Thunder | 48+ (Note: The Netball Superleague website lists Malcolm as having 48 appearances between 2020 and 2022. Appearances prior to 2020 are not counted there.) |
| 2023 | Mainland Tactix | |
- (Correct as of 15:04, 13 March 2023 (UTC))
| Years | National team | Caps |
| 2012–2023 | England | 38 |
- (Correct as of 08:22, 14 April 2022 (UTC))
Medal record
Representing England
Netball World Cup
| Silver medal – second place | 2023 Cape Town | Netball |

Laura Malcolm (born 20 May 1991) is an English former netball player and co-captain of the national team. At club level, she most recently played for Mainland Tactix in the ANZ Premiership, and has previously played for Netball Superleague teams Manchester Thunder and Severn Stars.

== Club career ==
Malcolm played for Manchester Thunder and Severn Stars. She won the 2014 Netball Superleague with Manchester Thunder. Malcolm joined Severn Stars from Thunder in 2017, and was their team captain. Malcolm returned to Thunder ahead of the 2019 season. She was part of the Thunder team that won the 2019 Netball Superleague. She was named in the 2021 Netball Superleague Team of the Year. In September 2021, Malcolm signed a new two-year contract with Manchester Thunder.

In June 2022, Malcolm announced that she was leaving Manchester Thunder to play overseas. That month, she signed for New Zealand team Mainland Tactix ahead of the 2023 ANZ Premiership season. In June 2024, Malcolm announced her retirement from netball. That year, she was a coach for Manchester Thunder.

== International career ==
Malcolm made her debut for the England national netball team in a 2012 match against Barbados. She had previously been in the England squad for the 2011 World Netball Series. In June 2024 Malcolm announced her retirement from international netball.

In 2019, she was appointed vice-captain for the England tour of South Africa, and was also vice-captain for the 2020 Netball Nations Cup. She was named co-captain alongside Serena Guthrie for the 2020 Taini Jamison Trophy Series. As of March 2021, she had made 31 appearances for England. Malcolm was included in the England squad for the 2022 Commonwealth Games. Malcolm was part of the England team that came second at the 2023 Netball World Cup.

== Personal life ==
Malcolm runs her own netball coaching business, Maias Netball. During the COVID-19 pandemic in the United Kingdom, she taught many sessions online. She believes that people should be judged on merits rather than the colour of their skin. Malcolm's father died in 2013.
