= Allan Munaaba =

Ugandan football player (born 1989)

Personal information
- Full name: Allan Tarsis Munaaba
- Date of birth: 19 April 1989 (age 37)
- Place of birth: Mulago, Kampala District, Uganda
- Height: 1.76 m (5 ft 9 in)
- Position: Defender

Senior career*
Years	Team	Apps	(Gls)
2007	SC Villa	6	(1)
2007-	URA SC		
- * Club domestic league appearances and goals as of 18 July 2018

Allan Tarsis Munaaba (born 19 April 1989) is a Ugandan retired football player who played for Uganda Revenue Authority SC in the Ugandan Premier League as a left defender. Currently, he serves as the Uganda Revenue Authority SC Chief Executive Officer since September 2021.

== Club career ==
Munaaba started playing football in Jinja Municipal Council F.C. in 2005, SC Villa and he last played in Uganda Revenue Authority SC. He joined Uganda Revenue Authority SC in 2008 and made his debut against Young Africans FC in the Cecafa Cup 2008, Uganda Revenue Authority SC won 2-0 whereby Allan made an assist for the second goal. He scored his first goal for Uganda Revenue Authority SC against Sharing F.C at Nakivubo in 2009. Allan was a squad member which played in the CAF Confederation Cup 2015 and featured in all the matches. Allan is also the captain of Uganda Revenue Authority SC. In June 2020, he retired from football. In September 2021, he was appointed as the new Uganda Revenue Authority SC Chief Executive Officer replacing Henry Mayeku.

== Lifestyle ==
In 2012, Munaaba graduated with a Bachelor of Business in Marketing from Makerere University.

== Honors ==
Uganda Revenue Authority SC

- 1st Runners Tusker cup (1): 2008
- Ugandan Premier League: 2

2008–09
2010–11

- FUFA Super Cup: 2

2010, 2013

- Ugandan Cup: 2

2011-2012, 2013-2014

- Mapinduzi cup: 1

2016
