= Sarah Nakiyunga =

Ugandan netball player (born 2000)

Personal information
- Born: October 12, 2000 (age 25) Kakinzi 45, Luweero District, Central Region, Uganda
- Height: 164 cm (5 ft 5 in)

Netball career
- Playing position(s): Wing Attack (WA), Centre (C)

Sarah Nakiyunga nicknamed Serah Michelle (born 12 October 2000) is a Ugandan professional netball player who plays as a wing attacker/ centre in the Uganda national netball team referred to as She-Cranes.

Nakiyunga was born by Mr.Wasswa Daniel and Ms. Nakanwagi Justine in Kakinzi 45 Luweero, central region.

== Education background ==
Sarah completed her Primary education from St Mary's Primary School- Luweero in 2013. She joined Broadway High School Kawempe for her secondary education. She finished her Advanced level education in 2019 at Ngando SS in Wamala Butambala. After she joined Kampala University pursue bachelors in Mass Communication.

== Club career ==
Nakiyunga started playing netball at a tender age in 2011 during her study journey at St Mary's Primary School. While at this school she gained more skills from coach Raymond and Sharif Kiberu. She did netball trials at Broadway High School- Kawempe in 2014 and she passed them hence receiving a half bursary at the very school.

Due to her talent, Ngando SS spotted her during a camp in Luweero as they were preparing for 2015 Nationals and offered her full bursary in 2015. Thus, shifted to Ngando SS from Broadway High School. Sarah also played for Tanzania's Netball Club, Arusha City Council, from where she joined UPDF Netball Club in 2019. In 2021 she joined National Insurance Corporation.

She was among the 15 players who represented the country in the 2023 Netball World Cup in Cape Town South Africa. She participated in the 2023 Netball World Cup upon replacing Christine Namulumba at Wing Attack and made an impact with 16 goal assists leading She Cranes to win Wales.

== Awards ==
Nakiyunga won four district titles and four zone championships for Ngando SS. She won two gold medals for UMEA championships.
