= Christine Nakitto =

Ugandan netball player

Personal information
- Full name: Christine Nakitto
- Born: 28 December 2001 (age 24) Wakiso, Central Region, Uganda
- Occupation: Netball player
- Height: 1.76 m (5 ft 9 in)

Netball career
- Playing position: GA
2025	KL Wildcats club	
Years	National team	Caps
2023–2024	Uganda She-Cranes	

Christine Nakitto (born 28 December 2001) is a Ugandan netball player who plays for KL Wildcats club, a team competing in the Malaysian Netball Super League as a defender.

== Early life and educational background ==
Nakitto was born in Masuliita, Wakiso district to Moses Mayambala and Annet Nankya. Nakitto studied at Kabale Primary School in Masuliita, where she was a long-distance runner in 7 km and 12 km races before joining netball. She later attended Masuliita Secondary School, Light College Katikamu, Exodus College School in Wakiso, and Buddo Secondary School.

== Club career ==
Christine Nakitto began her netball journey in Primary 5 (P5) at Kabale Primary School in Masuliita, where she played as a Goalkeeper. She continued playing netball while at Masuliita Secondary School, Light College Katikamu, Exodus College School in Wakiso, and Buddo Secondary School. In 2022, Nakitto joined Kampala Capital City Authority (KCCA) netball club. In 2025, She signed with the KL Wildcats, a team competing in the Malaysian Netball Super League.

== National career ==
In 2023, Nakitto was called to the senior national team, the She Cranes for the 2023 Netball World Cup, which were held in Cape Town, South Africa where the She Cranes finished 5th overall. Nakitto was also part of the She Cranes Squad that competed in the in 2024 Netball Test Series.

== Achievements and awards ==
Nakitto was part of the She Cranes Squad that made Uganda secure the 5th place in the 2023 Netball World Cup, which were held in Cape Town,South Africa.

She was part of the She Cranes Squad that won a bronze medal in 2024 FAST5 Netball World Series which were held in Christchurch, New Zealand.

Nakitto was named the second-best defender in the 2025 Malaysian Netball Super League.
