= Netball in Africa =

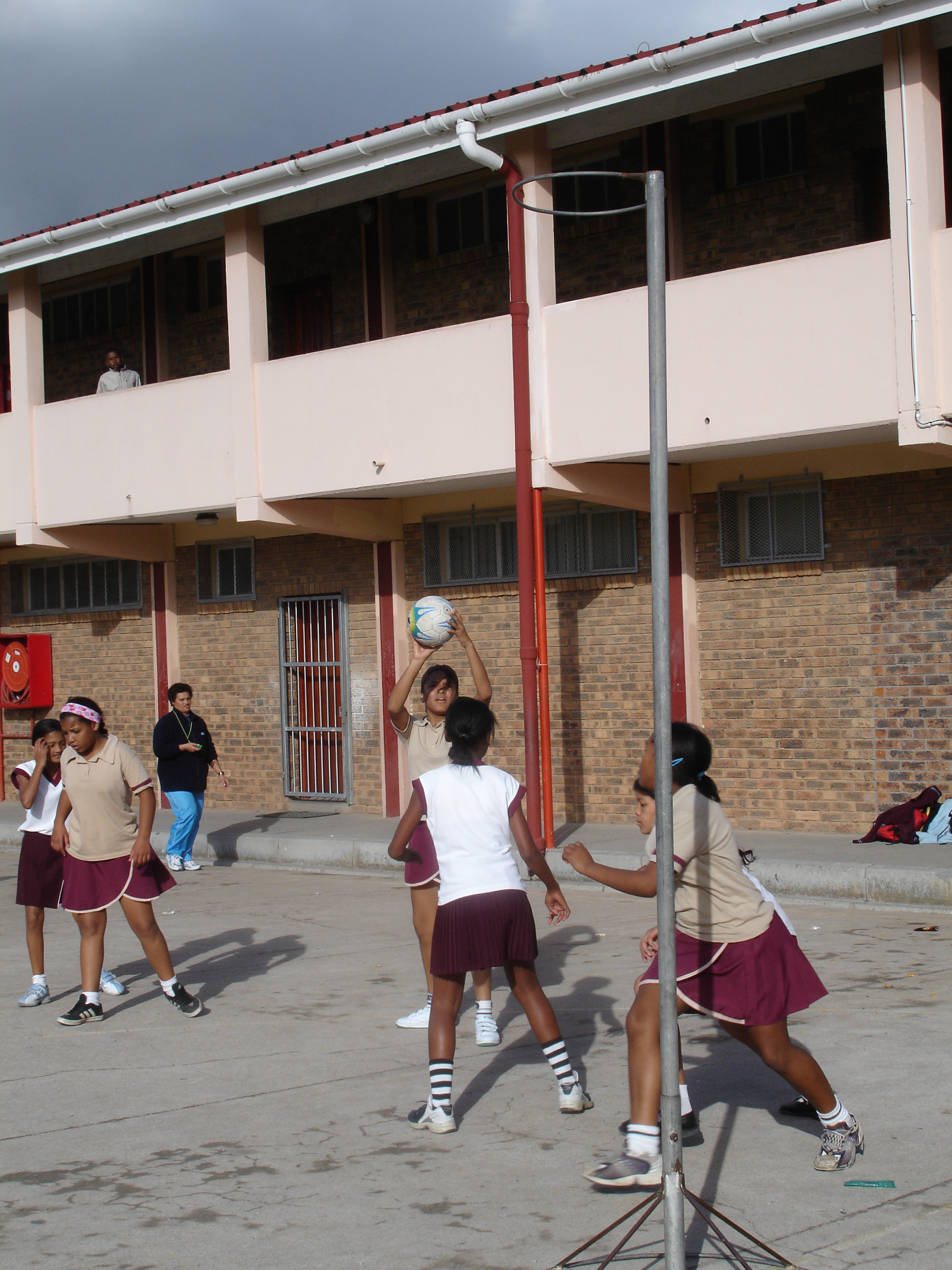
Schoolyard netball game at Reygersdal Primary School, South Africa.

Netball is a popular women's sport in parts of Africa. Several African nations are ranked amongst the top thirty in the world. As of August 2016, South Africa was ranked number Five, Malawi was ranked number Six, Uganda was ranked Seven, Zambia was ranked Sixteenth, Botswana was ranked twentieth, Zimbabwe was ranked Twenty-first and Swaziland was ranked Thirtieth in the world.

== South Africa ==
Netball is one of the most popular women's participation sports in South Africa. While participation rates are high, there is no sense of collective identity by players as netballers and being part of a national netball community. In 2002, 40% of African girls rated netball as their favourite sport. Many African girls claimed netball as their favourite sport even if they had never played it.

The history of South Africa's netball involvement mirrors that of other sports played in the country such as rugby union. South Africa was involved with the international netball community early in the sport's history, taking part in the 1960 meeting of Commonwealth countries in Sri Lanka to standardise the rules for the game. South Africa's international involvement was suspended because of apartheid era policies. In 1969, South Africa was expelled from competing internationally in netball. Other countries turned down tours to South Africa. Some countries, including England and New Zealand, continued to occasionally compete against South Africa, which led to their national players also being banned from international competitions. When they rejoined the community in the 1990s, internal racial tensions continued to plague the sport on the local level.

In 1994, the national team had their first international tour after a 20-year absence from international competition. The success of the South African Springboks in the 1995 Rugby World Cup had a positive impact on support for other South African national teams at international competitions, including the nation's appearance at the 1995 Netball World Championships. South Africa provided a major upset when they beat New Zealand in pool play during the tournament, with South Africa finishing second behind Australia. In 1995, the South African Police Service (SAPS) held its first National Netball Championships in Pretoria. The development of SAPS netball was not taken seriously until 1999 when they affiliated to Netball South Africa as an associated member. The Southern African Development Community has a sport competition with over 600 correctional officers from member countries participating. The 2000 national championships were held in Cape Town. In 2000, New Zealand's national side toured South Africa for the first time. The two countries played three test matches and New Zealand won them all. In 2001, a Tri-Nations Series was launched between Australia, New Zealand and South Africa, which was also won by New Zealand.

== Botswana ==
Netball is primarily played by women in Botswana. Girls are introduced into the game at primary schools, as part of the school curriculum. Men have traditionally served as officials, coaches and administrators for the sport. They also had their own teams. This started to change in the 2000s, with men only teams having been discontinued in favour of mixed gendered teams. The Botswana Netball Association is the national organisation responsible for netball in Botswana. It was founded in the 1970s. It is a member of IFNA and COSANA. Botswana has 30 local graded umpires and 22 locally trained coaches who have been certified by Netball South Africa. Botswana competed in the annual Confederation of Southern African Netball Associations (COSANA) tournament in 2008. Spar – “Good for You” Netball League is the most important national netball competition in Botswana. Naming rights for the league were given to Sar in 2010. The league is divided into two divisions, north and south. Games for the 2010 season began on 22 May. The league championships were held on 27 November 2010 at the BONA Courts in Gaborone. As of 2016, the women's national team was ranked number twentieth in the world.

== Malawi ==
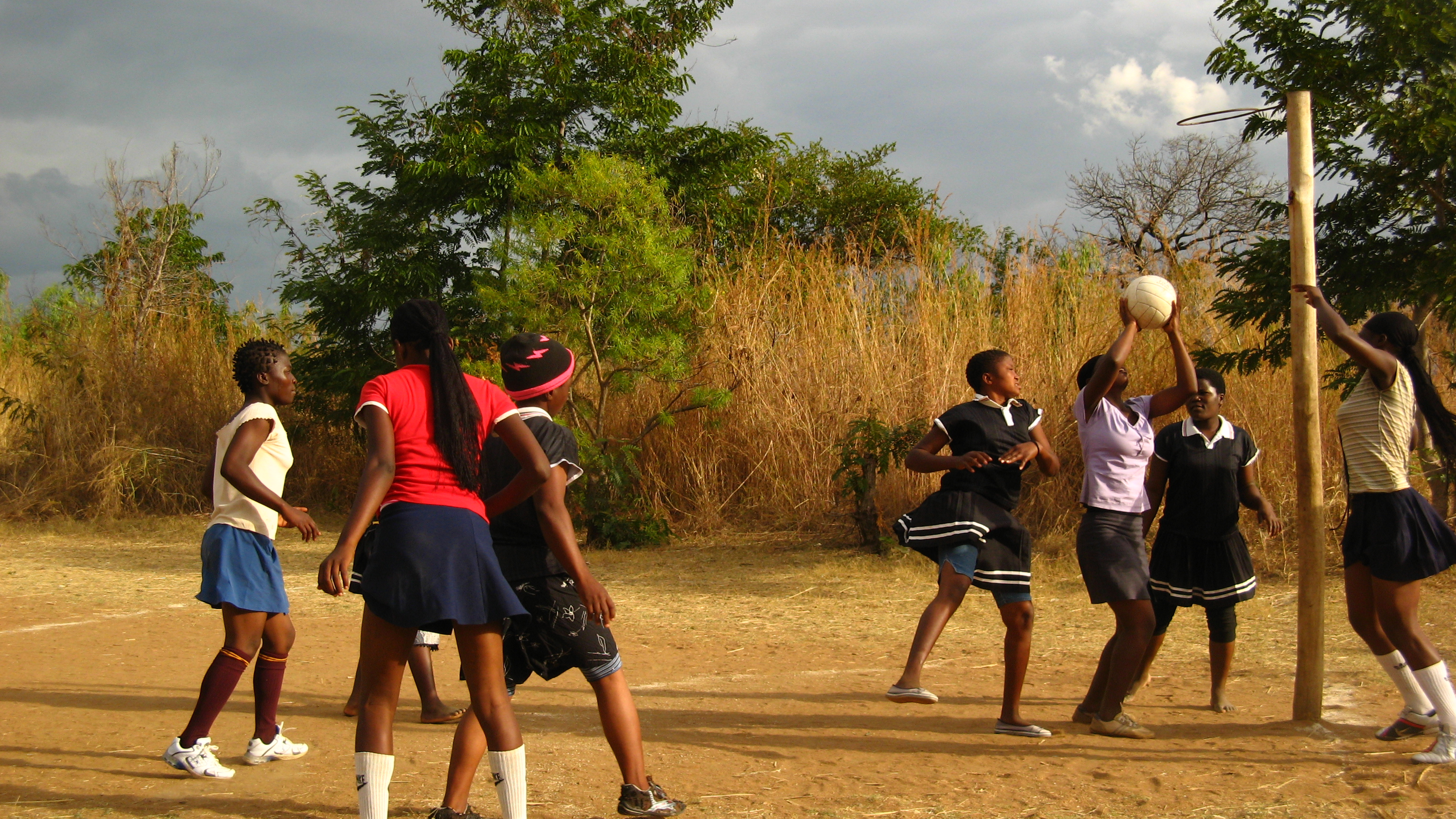
A netball match in Malawi

Netball is the most popular women's sport in Malawi. The Malawi word for netball is mpira wa manja, where Mpira means "Ball". This name links the sport to women and those who are responsible for taking care of their families. Malawi's national team is called the Queens. In 1992, the ADMARC Tigresses won the Southern African Netball Associations trophy. A Malawian player was also named the best player in that tournament. In April 2008, Lesotho hosted the Malawi Under-21 national netball team. The match was part of the annual Confederation of Southern African Netball Associations (COSANA) tournament. In 2011, high-profile national player Mary Waya retired from the national team to take up a position as national U20 coach. That year, goal shooter Mwayi Kumwenda received a scholarship to play in the Victorian Netball League in Australia, becoming Malawi's first netball export player. Kumwenda joined the Mainland Tactix in 2014 to become the 1st African Import player into the ANZ Championship and the team has confirmed their wish to see her return for the 2015 season. As of 2016, the women's national team was ranked number six in the world.

== Tanzania ==
Netball was one of the most popular sports in Tanzania. The sport was introduced to the country after World War I, when the country was under British colonial rule. The sport was intended for leisure and first played in schools. For this reason, almost all primary schools in the country have a court. Recruitment for the national team and other high level teams started at that level. The Netball Association of Tanzania (CHANETA) was created in 1966. Women have historically dominated in leadership positions in CHANETA but men are still involved, especially in roles like coaching. During the 1970s and 1980s, there was a push by the International Olympic Committee and the British Council to promote sport and women's sport in Tanzania. Despite netball being the most popular women's sport at the time, no investment was made into the sport. Netball's popularity declined during the 1990s as a result of economic liberalisation. Courts were not maintained, leagues were closed and there were fewer competitions. Attempts to raise netball's popularity in the country again have been hampered by the fact that sport is culturally more acceptable for men. Top level teams in the country, prior to the 1990s, have included Tanzania Harbour Authority, and Tanzania Postal and Telecommunication. Tanzania's national team is called the Taifa Queens. In their opening match in the NTUC Fairprice Foundation Nations Cup 2010, against Singapore, they won 52–36. Mwanaidi Hassan was the team's star player in the tournament. Some of the top performances for the Tanzania national netball team include third place at the 2010 Nations Cup. As of 2016, the women's national team was not ranked in the world.

== International competitions ==
- Africa Netball Cup
- Netball South Africa Diamond Challenge

== National teams ==
Full Members

Team	Association
Botswana	Botswana Netball Association
Burundi	
Eswatini	Netball Eswatini
Ghana	
Kenya	Kenya Netball Association
Ivory Coast	
Lesotho	Netball Association of Lesotho
Malawi	Netball Association of Malawi
Namibia	Netball Namibia
Nigeria	
South Africa	Netball South Africa
Tanzania	Netball Association of Tanzania
Uganda	Uganda Netball Federation
Zambia	Netball Association of Zambia
Zimbabwe	Zimbabwe Netball Association

Associate Members

Team	Association
(Democratic Republic of the Congo) DR Congo	
Liberia	
Seychelles	

Other netball nations

Team	Association
Angola	
Egypt	
Ethiopia	
Mauritius	
Senegal	
Sierra Leone	

== Bibliography ==
- All England Netball Association (1976). Golden jubilee : 1926–1976. All England Netball Association. OCLC 39500756.
- BNSC (11 May 2011). "Botswana Netball Association". BNSC. Archived from the original on 6 July 2011.
- Booth, Douglas (1998). The Race Game: Sport and Politics in South Africa. Sport in the Global Society. Routledge. ISBN 0-7146-4799-3. OCLC 361505975.
- Britton, Hannah Evelyn; Fish, Jennifer Natalie; Meintjes, Shelia (2009). Women's activism in South Africa : working across divides. University of KwaZulu-Natal Press. ISBN 978-1-86914-146-2. OCLC 271135550.
- Clark, Domini (2009). South Africa : the people. Crabtree Pub. ISBN 978-0-7787-9291-8. OCLC 226999206.
- DaCosta, Lamartine P.; Miragaya, Ana (2002). Worldwide experiences and trends in sport for all. Meyer & Meyer Sport. ISBN 1-84126-085-1. OCLC 248362122.
- De Capua, Sarah (2009). Malawi in pictures. Visual geography series. Twenty-First Century Books. ISBN 978-0-8225-8575-6. OCLC 180989476.
- International Federation of Netball Associations (15 June 2008). "History of Netball". Archived from the original on 6 March 2011.
- International Federation of Netball Associations (21 January 2011a). "Current World Rankings". Archived from the original on 19 May 2011.
- Kapsula, Jessie Kabwila (2010). "2010 Fifa World Cup and the Patriarchy of Football Spectatorship". Gender, sport, and development in Africa : cross-cultural perspectives on patterns of representations and marginalization. pp. 27–47. ISBN 978-2-86978-306-5. OCLC 656503228.
- Keim, Marion (2003). Nation building at play : sport as a tool for social integration in post-apartheid South Africa. Meyer and Meyer Sport. ISBN 1-84126-099-1. OCLC 249142681.
- Majumdar, Boria; Mangan, J A (2003). Cricketing Cultures in Conflict: Cricketing World Cup 2003 (Sport in the Global Society). Routledge. ISBN 0-7146-8407-4. OCLC 55625169.
- Massoa, Prisca; Fasting, Kari (December 2002). "Women and sport in Tanzania". In Pfister, Gertrud; Hartmann-Tews, Ilse (eds.). Sport and Women: Social Issues in International Perspective. International Society for Comparative Physical Education & Sport. Routledge. ISBN 0-415-24628-8. OCLC 50204306.
- Nauright, John (1997). Sport, cultures and identities in South Africa. Leicester University Press. ISBN 0-7185-0049-0. OCLC 243899939.
- Netball New Zealand (3 August 2009). "History".
- Netball Singapore (13 December 2010a). "NTUC FairPrice Foundation Nations Cup 2010". Archived from the original on 6 March 2011.
- Nyasa Times Reporter (10 April 2008). "Malawi U-21 netball in Lesotho for Cosana". Nyasa Times. Archived from the original on 7 March 2011.
- Shakespear, Wilma; Caldow, Margaret (2009). Netball : steps to success. Champaign, Illinois: Human Kinetics. ISBN 978-0-7360-7984-6. OCLC 251227987.
- South African Communication Service (1994). Servamus. The Service. OCLC 31942567.
- South African Police (2007). South Africa yearbook. SARP-Uitgevers. OCLC 6720450.
- Sweetman, Caroline (1998). Gender and technology. Oxfam Focus on Gender. Oxfam. ISBN 0-85598-422-8. OCLC 185496121.
- Turok, Karina; Orford, Margie (2006). Life and soul : portraits of women who move South Africa. Double Storey. ISBN 1-77013-043-8. OCLC 485729292.
- United Nations Centre Against Apartheid (1976). Notes and documents – Centre Against Apartheid, Issues 1–37. United Nations Centre Against Apartheid. OCLC 6842063.
- Zakazaka, Gomezgani (11 December 2010). "Waya dreams big". The Nation. Archived from the original on 23 July 2011.
