= Sophie Drakeford-Lewis =

English netball player

Personal information
- Born: 10 December 1998 (age 27)
- Height: 1.80 m (5 ft 11 in)
- School: The Abbey School
- University: University of Bath

Netball career
- Playing positions: Goal attack, wing attack
Years	Club team	Apps
2017–2018	Hertfordshire Mavericks	
2018–2022	Team Bath	46+ (Note: The Netball Superleague website only gives appearances from 2020 onwards. She made appearances between 2020 and 2022.)
2023–2024	Surrey Storm	0
- (Correct as of 16:02, 20 January 2023 (UTC))
Years	National team	Caps
?–?	England U17	
c. 2017	England U21	1+
2017–	England	21
- (Correct as of 16:02, 20 January 2023 (UTC))
Medal record
Representing England
Netball World Youth Cup
Bronze medal – third place	2017 Gaborone	Netball
- Updated on 08:41, 25 September 2021 (UTC)

Sophie Drakeford-Lewis (born 10 December 1998) is an English netball player who most recently played for Surrey Storm and has represented the national team. She has previously played for Saracens Mavericks and Team Bath, and was awarded the Young Player of the Season Award for the 2019 Netball Superleague season. Drakeford-Lewis has played tennis, and she was at one time the highest ranked Briton at under-16 and under-18 level.

== Early life ==
Drakeford-Lewis attended The Abbey School, Reading. As a youngster, Drakeford-Lewis played tennis. Aged 14, Drakeford-Lewis won the HSBC Road to Wimbledon National 14 and Under Challenge Finals competition, and at the age of 15, she was the highest ranked Briton at under-16 and under-18 level. She studied Integrated Mechanical & Electrical Engineering at the University of Bath, and graduated in 2021. She restarted playing tennis in 2024, where she attempted to qualify for the 2024 Surbiton Trophy.

== Club career ==
Drakeford-Lewis started playing netball in Woodley, Berkshire. She plays as a goal attack or wing attack. She started her playing career in 2017 at Hertfordshire Mavericks (now Saracens Mavericks), and was nominated for the Netball Superleague Young Player of the Season. In total, she scored 283 goals for Mavericks. In 2018, Drakeford-Lewis started playing for Team Bath. She resigned for the club for the 2019 season. That year, was awarded the Young Player of the Season Award, and she continued with Team Bath for the 2020 season. In November 2020, Drakeford-Lewis confirmed that she would play for Bath in the 2021 season, and in October 2021, she was named in the Bath squad for the 2022 season.

Ahead of the 2023 Netball Superleague season, Drakeford-Lewis signed for Surrey Storm. She decided to end her full-time netball career prior to the 2024-25 season.

== International career ==
Drakeford-Lewis has represented the England under-17s team. She played for England under-21s at the 2017 Netball World Youth Cup, where they finished third overall.

She made her debut for the senior team in a 2017 Netball Europe Open Championships match against Fiji. Her next appearance for England was during the 2019 England netball team tour of South Africa. She played all three matches in the 2020 Taini Jamison Trophy Series against New Zealand, scoring 23 of her 27 attempts at goal in the series. She also played in the 2021 Taini Jamison Trophy Series against New Zealand, and the 2021 Vitality Roses Reunited Series against Jamaica. In December 2021, she was named in the England squad for the 2022 Netball Quad Series. Drakeford-Lewis was included in the England squad for the netball event at the 2022 Commonwealth Games.
