= Stella Oyella =

Ugandan netball player (born 1990)

Personal information
- Born: February 8, 1990 (age 36) Kamwokya, Uganda
- Occupation: netball player
- Height: 1.74 m (5 ft 8 1/2 in)

Netball career
- Playing positions: Goal Attack, Centre

Stella Oyella (born 8 February 1990) is an Ugandan netball player who represents Uganda internationally and plays in the position of goal attack. She has represented Uganda at the 2018 Commonwealth Games and also competed at two World Cup tournaments in 2015 and in 2019.

In September 2019, she was included in the Ugandan squad for the 2019 African Netball Championships.

Known for her tireless work rate and ability to command the pace and direction of the game. She describes a tenacious attacker with exquisite recovery runs as the game progresses.
