= Halima Nakachwa =

Ugandan netball player

Personal information
- Born: December 23, 1988 (age 37) Uganda
- Occupation: Netballer

Netball career
- Playing positions: Centre (C), Wing Attack (WA)
Years	Club team	Apps
- Prisons Netball Club
Years	National team	Caps
- Uganda

Halima Nakachwa (born 23 December 1988) is a Ugandan netball player who participates in the Uganda national netball and the Prisons Netball teams. She plays both as a Centre (C) and Winger Attacker (WA).

== Netball career ==
Halima Nakachwa was spotted by netball scouts while at Gombe high school and hence taken by Prisons Netball Club. There after she joined the Uganda national netball team (She Cranes). She was among the She Cranes squad that played in the Diamond League campaign in Durban, South Africa in preparation for the 2015 Netball World Cup to take place in Australia. She participated in the Vitality Netball International Series match at the Copper Box Arena, London. She was among the key players for the She Cranes during the 2017 Africa Netball Championship where the She Cranes beat Zimbabwe 61–45 at MTN Arena, Lugogo playground. She also played in the national netball team during the Six Nations Netball Championship in Singapore helped Uganda team to win Singapore by 52–29. Nakachwa was among the netballers in the first batch of team Uganda to arrive in Australia for the 2018 Gold Coast Commonwealth games.

== Awards ==
Nakachwa was voted as Uganda's Most Valuable Player during the Six Nations Netball Championship in Singapore.

== Other information ==
Nakachwa did not return from England after She cranes losing the match to the England Roses (3–0). The team was led by National Council of Sports’ general Secretary Bernard Ogwel and Uganda Netball Federation president MS Susan Anek.
