= Renske Stoltz =

South African netball player

Personal information
- Born: April 19, 1994 (age 32) Nelspruit, South Africa
- Occupation: Netball coach
- Height: 1.69 m (5 ft 7 in)
- Relatives: Frederick Stoltz(father), Adri Stoltz(mother), Ciska Stoltz (sibling)
- School: Hoërskool Rustenburg
- University: North-West University Potchefstroom

Netball career
- Playing positions: GA, GS
Years	Club team	Apps
2018	Wasps Netball	
2015-2017	North West Flames	
2017-2018	Loughborough Lightning Fast 5	
Years	National team	Caps
2015-2021	South Africa	32
2018-2020	South Africa Fast 5	12
Medal record
Representing South Africa
World University Netball Championship
Gold medal – first place	2016 Miami	Team

Renske Stoltz is a South African netball player.

== Early life ==
Stoltz was born in Nelspruit, Mpumalanga before shifting with her family to Rustenburg, North West. She has played netball for the past seventeen years and attended Hoërskool Rustenburg.

== Career ==
Stoltz earned her first cap against New Zealand in the Netball Quad Series. She was also part of the under-19 Baby Proteas squad. She also participated in the Brutal Fruit Netball Cup for the North West Flames where she was named Player of the tournament in 2016 and Shooter of the tournament in 2017. She represented her university in the local varsity netball championship where the North West University won the Varsity netball title for two consecutive years in 2015 and 2016. She also played for Loughborough Lightning in the British Fast5 All Stars Netball Championship whereby she sank a last-minute five pointer in the grand final against Team Bath to earn the championship title as well as earned the player of the series award. She also got selected to represent South Africa in the 2017 Fast5 Netball World Series in Australia. Stoltz got signed by defending Netball Superleague champions Wasps Netball for the 2018 season, though only stayed at the club for one season.
