= Peace Proscovia =

Ugandan netball player

Personal information
- Full name: Peace Proscovia Drajole Agondua
- Born: 1 November 1989 (age 36) Arua, Northern Region, Uganda
- Height: 1.93 m (6 ft 4 in)
- School: Mvara Secondary School, Arua
- University: Nkumba University; Uganda Christian University; Loughborough University

Netball career
- Playing position: GS
Years	Club team	Apps
2015–2018	Loughborough Lightning	
2019–2021	Sunshine Coast Lightning	42
2022–	Surrey Storm	
Years	National team	Caps
2013–	Uganda She-Cranes	

Peace Proscovia Drajole Agondua (born 1 November 1989), commonly known as Peace Proscovia and nicknamed "Warid Tower", is a professional Ugandan netball player for Surrey Storm and the current captain of the Uganda national team.

She began her professional career with Netball Superleague team Loughborough Lightning and has also played for Super Netball team Sunshine Coast Lightning. Internationally, she captained the Ugandan teams that won the 2013 Netball Singapore Nations Cup, and the 2017 African Netball Championship.

== Background and education ==
She was born on 1 November 1989 in Arua, West Nile sub-region, in the Northern Region of Uganda, to a family with a total of seven children. She attended Awindiri Primary School, in Arua. She studied at Mvara Secondary School, also in Arua, for both her O-Level and A-Level studies. She was admitted to Nkumba University, where she obtained a Diploma in Development Studies, graduating in 2010. That same year, she was admitted to Uganda Christian University (UCU) in Mukono, where she obtained a Bachelor of Business Administration (BBA) degree in 2013. In 2014, she received a full scholarship to study for a Master of Business Administration (MBA) at UCU. In 2017, she enrolled in the Master of Science (MSc) degree program at the Loughborough University, specializing in marketing.

== Career ==
In 2015, she tried out with professional teams in the United Kingdom and was able to secure a trial contract with Loughborough Lightning in the winter and spring of 2015. In the same year she made her World Cup debut for Uganda during the 2015 Netball World Cup. In January 2016, she was signed to a full contract for the 2016 and 2017 seasons. After playing for Loughborough Lightning in 2015 and 2016, Proscovia re-signed for a further two years following changes in visa regulations. As part of her new contract she enrolled in the Master of Science degree program at the Loughborough University School of Business and Economics, with a focus on marketing.

Proscovia made the move to Australia to play for the Sunshine Coast Lightning in the 2019 season, an acquisition described by the club as "a massive coup". She partnered with teammates Stephanie Wood and Cara Koenen in the attacking circle and was rewarded with a contract extension through to the end of the 2020 season. She also led the Ugandan squad at the 2019 Netball World Cup. In September 2019, she was named in the Ugandan squad as the captain for the 2019 African Netball Championships. Just three weeks prior to the tournament, she herself ruled out of the tournament due to a knee injury which she sustained while playing at the Australian league.

She has now returned to the U.K. to play for Surrey Storm in the 2022 Netball Superleague season.

== Career highlights ==
Voted the country's top athlete of the year in 2014, she has participated in numerous sports. Her first passion is netball; she was a member of the 2015 Netball World Cup team in Sydney, Australia. She was a member of the Gazelles basketball team that participated in the AfroBasket Women 2015 championship in Cameroon. She was named Uganda's Athlete of the year in 2014.

== Other considerations ==
Prior to turning professional in netball, she played for the netball team of the National Insurance Corporation (NIC), where she worked as a marketing officer. She also plays basketball, although she admits she is not as good at it as she is at netball. She is a member of the women's basketball team of Kampala Capital City Authority and is on Uganda's National Women's Basketball Team.

=== Honours ===
- 2009 International Cup Tanzania – Gold Medal
- 2013 Africa Cup of Nations – Bronze Medal
- 2013 Six Nations Cup Singapore – Gold Medal
- 2014 Africa World Cup Qualifiers – Gold Medal
