= Mary Cholhok Nuba =

Ugandan netball player

- Mary Nuba in the she cranes jersey

Personal information
- Born: 3 January 1997 (age 29) Rumbek, Sudan (now South Sudan)
- Education: Loughborough University (Business Administration)
- Height: 2.01 m (6 ft 7 in)

Sport
- Sport: Netball
- Position: Goal shooter
Medal record
Representing Uganda
World University Netball Championship
Gold medal – first place	2018 Kampala	Team

Mary Cholhok Nuba (born 3 January 1997), also spelled as Mary Cholhock Nuba, sometimes known as Mary Cholhok or Mary Nuba, is a South Sudanese-born professional Ugandan netball player. She plays for the Queensland Firebirds in the Suncorp Super Netball league, and for the Uganda national netball team as the GS.

== Career ==
=== School career ===
She attended St. Mary's High School, where she represented them in national School Championships between 2013 and 2016.

=== NIC ===
In 2017, Mary joined NIC Netball Club. She played for NIC Netball Club from 2017 to 2018.

=== Loughborough University ===
In December 2018, Mary joined Loughborough University. She made her debut in Loughborough Lightning's first league game against Wasps on 5 January 2019 at the Arena Birmingham.

== National team ==
Mary made her debut for the Uganda national netball team during the 2018 World University games in Kampala. She represented Uganda in the 2019 Netball World Cup in England. In September 2019, she was included in the Ugandan squad for the 2019 African Netball Championships. She represented Uganda in the 2023 Netball World Cup and helped it finish in the fifth position.

== International career ==
Nuba signed for Queensland Firebirds in Australia which is in the Suncorp Super Netball.

== Honors ==
- Topscorer in National Netball Championship : 2016
- Topscorer in World University Games : 1: 2018
- Topscorer in Netball Superleague: 2: 2019, 2021
- The Coveted Golden Shot Award for 3 consecutive years
- Top scorer : 2023 Netball World Cup2023 Netball World Cup
