= Sandra Nambirige =

Ugandan netball player

Sandra Ruth Nambirige
Personal information
- Full name: Sandra Ruth Nambirige
- Born: Uganda
- Occupations: Netballer, Basketball player
- Relative: Cissy Nabakooza (mother)
- School: Bugolo Junior School, Lugala; Buddo Secondary School; St. Mary's Kitende
- University: Ndejje University

Netball career
- Playing position: Defender
Years	Club team	Apps
- KCCA Netball Club
- NIC Netball Club
- Magic Stormers Kampala (basketball)
Years	National team	Caps
20XX–present	Uganda (She Cranes)	

Sandra Nambirige also known as Sandra Ruth Nambirige is a Ugandan professional netball player who plays as a defender in the Uganda national netball team referred to as the She-Cranes. Nambirige was born to Ms. Cissy Nabakooza who was also a netballer. She is also a Ugandan basketball player participating in the Magic Stormers Kampala.

== Educational background ==
Nambirige completed her primary education from Bugolo Junior School, Lugala. She later joined Buddo SS for her ordinary level studies. She completed her advanced level education at St. Mary's Kitende and then joined Ndejje University.

== Club career ==
Nambirige was inspired by her teacher known as Makubuya while at Bugolo Junior School. At St Mary's Kitende she helped the team to win the national rally, district competitions and the East African netball trophies . Due to her talent, she was linked to KCCA netball club while in her A' level by coach Fred Mugerwa.

Nambirige was among National Insurance Corporation (NIC) squad that successfully defended their East Africa Netball Championship reaching their 21st title win at the Ulinzi Sports Complex in Kenya. She was also among participants in the Fast5 tournament in 2022 where the She Cranes claimed two victories, finishing fifth with three wins.

== Awards ==
In 2022, Nambirige was voted as the best player of November in the Netball category under Fortbet Real Stars Awards.

== See also ==
- National Insurance Corporation
- Hasifah Nassuna
- Shamirah Nalugya
- Fauzia Najjemba
