= Tanzania national netball team =

Netball team

- Confederation: (Africa)
- Head coach: Mary Protas

The Tanzania national netball team is the national netball team of Tanzania. As of 1 July 2015, they are currently not ranked in the INF World Rankings. The current team members are below.

== Players ==
Tanzania national netball team
Players	Coaching staff
Jacqueline Sikozy (c); Agnes Simkonda; Sophia Komba; Pascalina Kibayasa; Zuhura Twalibu; Semeni Selemani; Monica Kessy; Nyirabu Maxmilian; Neema Emanuel; Levina Julius; Judith Kazinja; Faraja Malaki; Doritha Mbunda; Lillian Sylidio; Mwanaidi Hassan; Nelly Anyingisye; Evodia Kazinja; Pili Peter; Mwanaham Saida; Maciret Constantine; Siwa Juma	Head coach: Mary Protas

== Head coaches ==
Coach	Years
(Australia) Simone McKinnis	2010–2011
