= Netball in Lesotho =

- Country: Lesotho
- National team: Lesotho

Lesotho has a national netball league, and has participated in as well as hosted several netball tournaments. The national league has some sponsors and the national team has been internationally ranked.

== Tournaments ==
In April 2008, Lesotho hosted the Malawi Under-21 national netball team. The match was part of the annual Confederation of Southern African Netball Associations (COSANA) tournament.

In September 2010, Lesotho performed poorly in the African qualifying tournament for the World Netball Championships. During the competition, they lost 50–25 to Tanzania, 84–16 to South Africa, 58–24 to Zimbabwe. The qualifying tournament took play in Pretoria, South Africa.

In December 2010, Lesotho hosted a one-day netball tournament. Ministry of Gender, Youth, Sports and Recreation was one of the co-organizers of the event. The tournament was created to help raise breast cancer awareness.

== Ranking ==
Lesotho has a national league. Corporations also sponsor teams around the country. Some corporate sponsors include Central Bank of Lesotho, Standard Lesotho Bank, Lesotho Revenue Authority and Metropolitan Lesotho. In September 2010, the national team was ranked number twenty-three in the world. As of January 2011, the women's national team was ranked number twenty-five in the world.

== Bibliography ==
- International Federation of Netball Associations (21 January 2011a). "Current World Rankings". Archived from the original on 19 May 2011.
- International Federation of Netball Associations (10 December 2010e). "Netball Weekly Roundup". Archived from the original on 14 March 2011.
- Nyasa Times (10 April 2008). "Malawi U-21 netball in Lesotho for Cosana". Nyasa Times. Archived from the original on 7 March 2011.
- Xinhua (10 September 2010). "Lesotho netball team humbled". Lesotho netball team humbled.
