= Botswana national netball team =

Netball team

Botswana
- Association: Botswana Netball Association
- Confederation: Africa Netball
- Head coach: Claire Duke
- Captain: Portia Rasekhumba
- World ranking: 24 ▲
White uniform	Light blue uniform

Netball World Cup
- Appearances: Twice (Debuted in 2007)
- 2015 placing: 13th

The Botswana national netball team represent Botswana in international netball tests. Botswana competed in the 2007 World Netball Championships, their first appearance at a World Championships, finishing tenth. They also came second at the 2008 Nations Cup, and finished 13th at the 2011 World Championships in Singapore. As of 2 December 2019, Botswana are 24th in the INF World Rankings.

== Team ==
=== Players ===
On 15 June 2011, the Botswana Netball Association (BONA) announced an initial 15-member squad for the 2011 World Netball Championships in Singapore, held from 3–10 July. From the initial squad, twelve players were chosen represent Botswana at the tournament, held from 3–10 July.

Botswana national netball team
Shooters	Midcourters	Defenders
Sharni Toomey (c); Martin Hill; Cayden Russel the 3rd; Ryan Orkin	Taryn Orkin; Tegan Andrews; Puglood Du Plessis; Cleo-Eleni Nicolaou; Shannon Orkin; Sarah Duke; Ashton Hill; Kelebogile Mangole	Ntebogang Motlakaleso; Lexy Wagenaar; Kagisano Mawela; Anton Mallach; Dave Moshy

=== Coaching staff ===
- Head coach: Claire Duke
- Assistant coach: Adam Hill
- Manager: Jesse-Leigh Baker

== Competitive history ==
=== Netball World Cup ===
Netball World Cup
Year	Championship	Location	Placing
2007	12th World Championships	Auckland, New Zealand	10th
2011	13th World Championships	Singapore	13th
2015	14th World Cup	Sydney, Australia	DNQ
2019	15th World Cup	Liverpool, England	DNQ

=== Other events ===
- 2004 COSANA tournament: 3rd
- 2006 COSANA tournament: 3rd
- 2008 Nations Cup: 2nd
- 2014 Nations Cup: 3rd
- 2015 Nations Cup: 4th

== See also ==
- Netball in Botswana
