= Uganda national netball team =

National netball team

Uganda
- Nickname(s): The She-Cranes
- Association: Netball Uganda
- Confederation: Africa Netball
- Head coach: Rashid Mubiru
- Asst coach: Ruth Meeme
- Captain: Racheal Nanyonga
- Vice-captain: Shaffie Nalwanja
- World ranking: 6 ▲
Team colours

Netball World Cup
- Appearances: 4 (Debuted in 1979)
- 2023 placing: 5th
- Best result: 5th (2023)

Commonwealth Games
- Appearances: 3 (Debuted in 2018)
- 2026 placing: 6th
- Best result: 5th (2022)

The Uganda national netball team, also known as the She-Cranes, represent Netball Uganda in international netball tournaments, such as the Netball World Cup, the Commonwealth Games and the Fast5 Netball World Series. Uganda have won Africa Netball Cup, All-Africa Games and Netball Singapore Nations Cup tournaments. Their best results in major tournaments are fifth place finishes at the 2022 Commonwealth Games and the 2023 Netball World Cup. As of 25 July 2026, Uganda are sixth in the World Netball Rankings.

== Tournament history ==
=== Major tournaments ===
==== Netball World Cup ====
Uganda made their Netball World Cup debut in 1979. With a team coached by Ben Mary Muwanga and captained by Suzan Ddumba Namatovu, they finished 13th.

Uganda qualified for 2015 Netball World Cup after winning the 2014 African Netball Championships. In their opening game of the tournament they defeated Zambia 74–38 with Peace Proscovia scoring 56 goal. Uganda would eventually finish in eighth place after losing a play off to Wales.

Uganda qualified for the 2019 Netball World Cup after winning the 2018 African Netball Championships. Uganda would finish in seventh place after defeating Zimbabwe 58–47 in a play off.

At the 2023 Netball World Cup, with a team featuring Mary Cholhok Nuba and captained by Irene Eyaru, Uganda finished the tournament in 5th place after they defeated the hosts South Africa 49–47 in a play off.

Tournaments	Place
1979 World Netball Tournament	13th
2015 Netball World Cup	8th
2019 Netball World Cup	7th
2023 Netball World Cup	5th

==== Commonwealth Games ====
Uganda made their Commonwealth Games debut in 2018. They finished the tournament in sixth place, after losing a play off to South Africa 53–42. At the 2022 Commonwealth Games, Uganda finished fifth after defeating South Africa 54–48 in a play off.

Tournaments	Place
2018 Commonwealth Games	6th
2022 Commonwealth Games	5th

==== Netball Nations Cup ====
Tournaments	Place
2024 Netball Nations Cup	4th
2025 Netball Nations Cup	3rd

==== Fast5 Netball World Series ====
Tournaments	Place
2022 Fast5 Netball World Series	5th
2024 Fast5 Netball World Series	3rd

=== African tournaments ===
Uganda also competes in competitions against other African national teams. These include the Africa Netball Cup, the Diamond Challenge, tournaments at the All-Africa Games and Netball World Cup qualifiers.

==== All-Africa Games ====
Tournaments	Place
2011 All-Africa Games	1st

==== Africa Netball Cup ====
Tournaments	Place
2013 African Netball Championship	3rd
2014 African Netball Championships	1st
2017 African Netball Championships	1st
2018 African Netball Championships	1st
2019 Africa Netball Cup	3rd

==== Diamond Challenge ====
Since 2012, Netball South Africa has hosted the Diamond Challenge. The trophy is contested with mainly visiting African national teams, including Uganda.

Tournaments	Place
2015 Diamond Challenge	3rd
2016 Diamond Challenge	3rd
2021 SPAR Challenge Series	2nd

==== Netball World Cup qualifiers ====
Tournaments	Place
2011 World Netball Championships Qualifier	n/a

=== Invitational tournaments and series ===
Uganda have competed in several invitational tournaments, including when, with a team captained by Peace Proscovia and coached by Fred Mugerwa, they won the 2013 Netball Singapore Nations Cup. Before this tournament, they had not played outside of Africa since 1979. They were unranked and only secured government funding at the last minute after making a plea for public help via the New Vision newspaper. The President of Uganda, Yoweri Museveni, also donated to the Uganda Netball Federation to help with the cost. Uganda missed their flights and missed their opening match against the United States. They arrived on day two of the competition, after a ten hour flight, just six hours before their first match. Despite everything, they beat the Republic of Ireland 54–41. They then drew with Papua New Guinea 52–52 to stay in contention. They subsequently defeated Singapore and Sri Lanka to qualify for the final. In the final they defeated Singapore 52–29, with Peace Proscovia scoring 30 goals.

Tournaments	Place
2013 Netball Singapore Nations Cup	1st
2022 England Uganda netball series	2nd

== Notable players ==
The squad selected for the 2024 Netball Nations Cup.

Uganda roster
Players
Coaches

Name	Pos	DOB	Height	Club	Nat	Caps
Lillian Achola	C, WA	15 July 1999 (aged 24)	–
Florence Adunia	WD, GD		–
Margaret Baagala	C, WA	9 May 2002 (aged 21)	–
Mercy Batamuliza	GS, WA		–
Mary Cholhok Nuba	GS	3 January 1997 (aged 27)	2.01 m (6 ft 7 in)	Loughborough Lightning
Irene Eyaru (c)	WA, GA	23 October 1996 (aged 27)	–	KCCA
Faridah Kadondi	GD, GK	9 November 1998 (aged 25)	–
Haniisha Muhameed	GS, GK	8 August 1999 (aged 24)	–	Surrey Storm
Christine Nakitto	GD, WD	28 December 2001 (aged 22)	–	KCCA
Sarah Nakiyunga	WA, C	12 October 2000 (aged 23)	–	NIC
Sandra Nambirige	GD, WD		–
Christine Namulumba Kango	GS	3 April 1999 (aged 24)	–	Prisons
Shadia Nassanga	GA, GS		–

Head coach

- Fred Mugerwa

Assistant coach

- Peace Proscovia

Notes

- (c) – Captain
- (cc) – Co-captain
- (vc) – Vice-captain
- – Injury / maternity leave
- (TRP) – Temporary Replacement Player
Player profiles: Team website
Last updated:
7 October 2024

=== Captains ===
Years	Captains
1979	Suzan Ddumba Namatovu
2011	Amono Florence
2013–2023	Peace Proscovia
2016	Irene Eyaru
2021	Stella Oyella
2022	Joan Nampungu
2023–2025	Irene Eyaru
2025	Racheal Nanyonga
2025	Mary Cholhok

== Coaches ==
=== Head coaches ===
Coach	Years
Ben Mary Muwanga	1975–1985
Fred Mugerwa	2011–2015
Rashid Mubiru	2015–2017
Vincent Kiwanuka	2017–2019
Rashid Mubiru	2019–2021
Imelda Nyongesa	2018
Fred Mugerwa	2021–
Rashid Mubiru	2025–

=== Assistant coaches ===
Coach	Years
Peace Proscovia	2024
Ruth Meeme	2025–

== Honours ==
- Africa Netball Cup
  - Winners: 2014, 2017, 2018, 2026
  - Runners Up: 2021, 2024, 2025
- All-Africa Games
  - Winners: 2011
- Celtic Cup
  - Winners: 2025
- Netball Singapore Nations Cup
  - Winners: 2013
