= Namibia national netball team =

Netball team

- Nickname(s): Desert Jewels
- Region: Africa
- Head coach: Julene Meyer
Uniform

The Namibia national netball team is the national netball team of Namibia. As of 2 December 2019, Namibia were 30th in the INF World Rankings. Namibia competed in the annual Confederation of Southern African Netball Associations (COSANA) tournament in 2008. The 2010 Nations Cup, called NTUC FairPrice Foundation Nations Cup 2010, was held in December. Namibia beat India 72–32 to capture fifth. The current team members are below.

Namibia national netball team
Players	Coaching staff
Anna Kaspar; Jatjinda 'Toetsie' Kambutuko; Nellandré Mostert; Louise' Dreamy' Kauhesua; Anna Shipanga; Jessica Moolman; Nanguloshi 'Eve' Kamutushi; Monica Gomases; Loide 'Bokkie' Hanyanya; Juzelri Garbers; Cornelia 'Corry' Mupenda; Mwale Mulenamaswe; Zanté Farmer; Monique Basson; Ilyn 'Foxy' Pura	Head coach: Julene Meyer; Asst coach: Sunette Burden; Asst coach: Antoinette Wentworth; Asst coach: Chrisna Lombard: Manager: Operi Tjipuka

Namibia finished third in the Nations Cup Netball Tournament 2012 held in Singapore.

In 2019, Namibia made a come back and defeated Singapore 49 - 42 in the Finals to win M1 Nations Cup.
