= 2009 end-of-year rugby union internationals =

Rugby union tour

The 2009 end of year rugby internationals, also known as the Autumn internationals in the Northern Hemisphere, saw Australia, New Zealand, South Africa, and Argentina, tour the northern hemisphere.

The headline event of the series was an attempted Grand Slam tour of the Home Nations by Australia. This year marked the 25th anniversary of the Wallabies' only previous Grand Slam tour, which saw the Wallabies sweep all four matches and saw David Campese, Mark Ella, Nick Farr-Jones, and Michael Lynagh achieve international prominence. Also, for the second consecutive year, a Bledisloe Cup match was contested by New Zealand and Australia outside of either country, this time in Tokyo. The final event of the series, the Barbarians' traditional Final Challenge, involved New Zealand, with the Barbarians winning over a mostly second-string All Blacks side.

For the first time since the inception of the IRB World Rankings in 2003, all of the top 20 teams in the rankings played matches in the November window. The only top-20 teams not playing in the November tours were Uruguay and the United States, which played a two-legged 2011 Rugby World Cup qualifying tie during November.

This year's series was also marked by more non-Test matches pitting Test teams with top-level club teams than in recent years. Matches of this type are often called "midweek matches" because they are traditionally played at midweek, most often on Wednesday, although they can also be scheduled on a weekend when the touring team has no Test scheduled. Australia and South Africa both scheduled two such matches; the Wallabies won both of their matches comfortably, while the Springboks lost both of theirs.

== Matches ==
=== Week 1 ===
31 October 2009
17:38 JST (UTC+09)

Australia	19–32	New Zealand
Try: Hynes 34' c Con: Giteau (1/1); Pen: Giteau (4/5) 5', 11', 28', 71'	Report	Try: Sivivatu 20' c Smith 45' c Con: Carter (2/2); Pen: Carter (6/6) 14', 31', 61', 68', 72', 77'

National Olympic Stadium, Tokyo
Attendance: 44,449
Referee: Mark Lawrence (South Africa)

FB	15	James O'Connor
RW	14	Peter Hynes
OC	13	Ryan Cross
IC	12	Adam Ashley-Cooper
LW	11	Digby Ioane
FH	10	Matt Giteau
SH	9	Will Genia
N8	8	Wycliff Palu	(substituted off) 54'
OF	7	David Pocock
BF	6	Rocky Elsom (c)
RL	5	Mark Chisholm	(substituted off) 49'
LL	4	James Horwill
TP	3	Ben Alexander
HK	2	Stephen Moore	(substituted off) 49'
LP	1	Benn Robinson
Replacements:
HK	16	Tatafu Polota-Nau	(substituted on) 49'
PR	17	Matt Dunning
LK	18	Dean Mumm	(substituted on) 49'
N8	19	George Smith	(substituted on) 54'
SH	20	Luke Burgess
FH	21	Drew Mitchell
CE	22	Quade Cooper
Coach:
(New Zealand) Robbie Deans

FB	15	Mils Muliaina
RW	14	Cory Jane
OC	13	Conrad Smith
IC	12	Ma'a Nonu
LW	11	Sitiveni Sivivatu	(yellow card) 32' to 42'
FH	10	Dan Carter	(substituted off) 78'
SH	9	Jimmy Cowan
N8	8	Rodney So'oialo	(substituted off) 53'
OF	7	Richie McCaw (c)
BF	6	Adam Thomson
RL	5	Tom Donnelly	(substituted off) 64'
LL	4	Brad Thorn
TP	3	Neemia Tialata	(substituted off) 46'
HK	2	Andrew Hore
LP	1	Tony Woodcock
Replacements:
HK	16	Corey Flynn
PR	17	John Afoa	(substituted on) 46'
LK	18	Jason Eaton	(substituted on) 64'
N8	19	Kieran Read	(substituted on) 53'
SH	20	Brendon Leonard
FH	21	Stephen Donald	(substituted on) 78'
CE	22	Tamati Ellison
Coach:
(New Zealand) Graham Henry

Assistant referees:
Craig Joubert (South Africa)
Taizo Hirabayashi (Japan)
Television match official:
Akihisa Aso (Japan)

=== Week 2 ===
7 November 2009
14:30 BT/GMT+0 (UTC+0)

England	9–18	Australia
Pen: Wilkinson (2/3) 8', 25'; Drop: Wilkinson (1/2) 3'	Report	Try: Genia 21' m Ashley-Cooper 72' c Con: Giteau (1/2); Pen: Giteau (2/2) 45', 60'

Twickenham Stadium, London
Attendance: 80,020
Referee: Bryce Lawrence (New Zealand)

FB	15	Ugo Monye
RW	14	Mark Cueto
OC	13	Dan Hipkiss
IC	12	Shane Geraghty
LW	11	Matt Banahan
FH	10	Jonny Wilkinson
SH	9	Danny Care
N8	8	Jordan Crane
OF	7	Lewis Moody
BF	6	Tom Croft
RL	5	Steve Borthwick (c)
LL	4	Louis Deacon
TP	3	David Wilson
HK	2	Steve Thompson
LP	1	Tim Payne
Replacements:
HK	16	Dylan Hartley
PR	17	Duncan Bell
LK	18	Courtney Lawes
N8	19	James Haskell
SH	20	Paul Hodgson
FH	21	Andy Goode
CE	22	Ayoola Erinle
Coach:
(England) Martin Johnson

FB	15	Adam Ashley-Cooper
RW	14	Peter Hynes
OC	13	Digby Ioane
IC	12	Quade Cooper
LW	11	Drew Mitchell
FH	10	Matt Giteau
SH	9	Will Genia
N8	8	Wycliff Palu
OF	7	George Smith
BF	6	Rocky Elsom (c)
RL	5	Mark Chisholm
LL	4	James Horwill
TP	3	Ben Alexander
HK	2	Stephen Moore
LP	1	Benn Robinson
Replacements:
HK	16	Tatafu Polota-Nau
PR	17	Matt Dunning
LK	18	Dean Mumm
FL	19	David Pocock
SH	20	Luke Burgess
CE	21	Ryan Cross
FB	22	James O'Connor
Coach:
(New Zealand) Robbie Deans

7 November 2009
16:30 WET/GMT+0 (UTC+0)

Portugal	9–12	Namibia
	Report

Estádio Universitário, Lisbon
Referee: Chris White (England)

7 November 2009
17:15 BT/GMT+0 (UTC+0)

Wales	12–19	New Zealand
Pen: S. Jones (4) 17', 34', 66', 74'	Report	Try: Hore 56' c Con: Carter; Pen: Carter (4) 11', 20', 42', 64'

Millennium Stadium, Cardiff
Attendance: 74,330
Referee: Craig Joubert (South Africa)

FB	15	James Hook
RW	14	Leigh Halfpenny
OC	13	Tom Shanklin
IC	12	Jamie Roberts
LW	11	Shane Williams
FH	10	Stephen Jones
SH	9	Gareth Cooper	(substituted off) 54'
N8	8	Ryan Jones (c)
BF	7	Martyn Williams
OF	6	Andy Powell	(substituted off) 66'
RL	5	Luke Charteris	(substituted off) 68'
LL	4	Alun Wyn Jones
TP	3	Paul James	(substituted off) 60'
HK	2	Matthew Rees	(substituted off) 60'
LP	1	Gethin Jenkins
Replacements:
HK	16	Huw Bennett	(substituted on) 60'
PR	17	Duncan Jones	(substituted on) 60'
LK	18	Bradley Davies	(substituted on) 68'
FL	19	Dafydd Jones	(substituted on) 66'
SH	20	Martin Roberts	(substituted on) 54'
CE	21	Jonathan Davies
WG	22	Tom James
Coach:
(New Zealand) Warren Gatland

FB	15	Mils Muliaina
RW	14	Cory Jane
OC	13	Conrad Smith
IC	12	Ma'a Nonu
LW	11	Zac Guildford
FH	10	Dan Carter
SH	9	Brendon Leonard	(substituted off) 49'
N8	8	Kieran Read	(substituted off) 65'
OF	7	Richie McCaw (c)
BF	6	Jerome Kaino
RL	5	Jason Eaton	(substituted off) 54'
LL	4	Brad Thorn
TP	3	Neemia Tialata
HK	2	Andrew Hore
LP	1	Wyatt Crockett	(substituted off) 59'
Replacements:
HK	16	Corey Flynn
PR	17	Owen Franks	(substituted on) 59'
LK	18	Tom Donnelly	(substituted on) 54'
FL	19	Adam Thomson	(substituted on) 65'
SH	20	Jimmy Cowan	(substituted on) 49'
FH	21	Stephen Donald
WG	22	Ben Smith
Coach:
(New Zealand) Graham Henry

Touch judges:
Mark Lawrence (South Africa)
Stuart Terheege (Wales)
Television match official:
Graham Hughes (England)

=== Week 3 ===
13 November 2009
19:00 CET/GMT+01 (UTC+01)

Italy A	33–6	Romania
Try: Buso 6'; Derbyshire 49'; Sepe 67'; Quartaroli 80'; Con: Bocchino (2/4); Pen: Bocchino (3) 15', 19', 47'	Report	Pen: Vlaicu (2) 3', 25'

Stadio Comunale Beltrametti, Piacenza
Referee: Romain Poite (France)

13 November 2009
19:00 IST/GMT+0 (UTC+0)

Ireland A	48–19	Tonga
	Report

Ravenhill Stadium, Belfast
Attendance: 3,777
Referee: Bryce Lawrence (New Zealand)

13 November 2009
19:30 BT/GMT+0 (UTC+0)

Wales	17–13	Samoa
Try: Halfpenny 6' m Pen: Biggar (3); Halfpenny	Report	Try: Mapusua 62' c Con: Fili; Pen: Fili (2)

Millennium Stadium, Cardiff
Attendance: 58,907
Referee: Peter Fitzgibbon (Ireland)

13 November 2009
20:45 CET/GMT+01 (UTC+01)

France	20–13	South Africa
Try: Clerc 31' m Pen: Dupuy (4/7) 5', 40', 49', 61'; Parra (1/1) 78'	Report	Try: Smit 29' c Con: Steyn (1/1); Pen: Steyn (1/2) 19'; Drop: Steyn (1/1) 24'

Stadium Municipal, Toulouse
Attendance: 34,889
Referee: Wayne Barnes (England)

FB	15	Damien Traille
RW	14	Vincent Clerc
OC	13	Yann David	(substituted off) 56'
IC	12	Maxime Mermoz
LW	11	Cédric Heymans	(substituted off) 76'
FH	10	François Trinh-Duc
SH	9	Julien Dupuy	(substituted off) 66'
N8	8	Louis Picamoles
OF	7	Imanol Harinordoquy	(substituted off) 57'
BF	6	Thierry Dusautoir (c)
RL	5	Romain Millo-Chluski
LL	4	Lionel Nallet	(substituted off) 53'
TP	3	Nicolas Mas	(substituted off) 49'
HK	2	William Servat	(substituted off) 53'
LP	1	Fabien Barcella
Replacements:
HK	16	Dimitri Szarzewski	(substituted on) 53'
PR	17	Sylvain Marconnet	(substituted on) 49'
LK	18	Sébastien Chabal	(substituted on) 53'
FL	19	Julien Bonnaire	(substituted on) 57'
SH	20	Morgan Parra	(substituted on) 66'
CE	21	David Marty	(substituted on) 56'
WG	22	Maxime Médard	(substituted on) 76'
Coach:
(France) Marc Lièvremont

FB	15	Zane Kirchner
RW	14	JP Pietersen
OC	13	Jaque Fourie
IC	12	Adi Jacobs	(substituted off) 69'
LW	11	Bryan Habana
FH	10	Morné Steyn	(yellow card) 40' to 50'
SH	9	Fourie du Preez
N8	8	Ryan Kankowski	(yellow card) 68' to 78'
BF	7	Schalk Burger	(substituted off) 47'
OF	6	Heinrich Brüssow
RL	5	Victor Matfield	19' to 30'
LL	4	Bakkies Botha	7' to 18'	(substituted off) 70'
TP	3	John Smit (c)
HK	2	Bismarck du Plessis	(substituted off) 70'
LP	1	Tendai Mtawarira	(substituted off) 54'
Replacements:
HK	16	Adriaan Strauss	(substituted on) 70'
PR	17	Wian du Preez
PR	18	CJ van der Linde	(substituted on) 54'
LK	19	Andries Bekker	(substituted on) 7'	(substituted off) 18'	(substituted on) 19'	(substituted off) 30'	(substituted on) 70'
FL	20	Danie Rossouw	(substituted on) 47'
FH	21	Ruan Pienaar
CE	22	Wynand Olivier	(substituted on) 69'
Coach:
(South Africa) Peter de Villiers

- Ras Dumisani's controversial rendition of the South African national anthem before the game caused a minor diplomatic incident afterwards.

14 November 2009
16:15 MT (UTC+04)

Georgia	24–22	Argentina XV
	Report

Boris Paichadze National Stadium, Tbilisi
Referee: Marius Jonker (South Africa)

14 November 2009
14:00 WAT (UTC+01)

Tunisia	13–18	Namibia
	Report

Stade El Menzah, Tunis
Referee: Mark Lawrence (South Africa)

14 November 2009
15:00 CET/GMT+01 (UTC+01)

Italy	6–20	New Zealand
Pen: Craig Gower (2/3) 5', 66'	Report	Try: Corey Flynn 30' m Pen: Luke McAlister (5/8) 8', 15', 43', 50', 80'

San Siro, Milan
Attendance: 80,074
Referee: Stuart Dickinson (Australia)

14 November 2009
14:30 BT/GMT+0 (UTC+0)

England	16–9	Argentina
Try: Banahan 71' c Con: Wilkinson (1/1); Pen: Wilkinson (2/5) 20', 39'; Drop: Wilkinson (1/1) 6'	Report	Pen: Rodríguez (3/6) 13', 25', 37'

Twickenham Stadium, London
Attendance: 78,743
Referee: Nigel Owens (Wales)

FB	15	Ugo Monye
RW	14	Mark Cueto
OC	13	Dan Hipkiss
IC	12	Shane Geraghty
LW	11	Matt Banahan
FH	10	Jonny Wilkinson	(substituted off) 75'
SH	9	Paul Hodgson	(substituted off) 75'
N8	8	James Haskell
OF	7	Lewis Moody
BF	6	Tom Croft	(substituted off) 62'
RL	5	Steve Borthwick (c)
LL	4	Louis Deacon
TP	3	Duncan Bell
HK	2	Dylan Hartley	(substituted off) 68'
LP	1	Tim Payne	(substituted off) 63'
Replacements:
HK	16	Steve Thompson	(substituted on) 68'
PR	17	Paul Doran-Jones	(substituted on) 63'
LK	18	Courtney Lawes
FL	19	Joe Worsley	(substituted on) 62'
SH	20	Danny Care	(substituted on) 75'
FH	21	Andy Goode	(substituted on) 75'
CE	22	Ayoola Erinle
Coach:
(England) Martin Johnson

FB	15	Horacio Agulla
RW	14	Lucas Borges
OC	13	Gonzalo Tiesi
IC	12	Martín Rodríguez
LW	11	Mauro Comuzzi
FH	10	Santiago Fernández
SH	9	Alfredo Lalanne	(substituted off) 75'
N8	8	Juan Martín Fernández Lobbe (c)
OF	7	Alejandro Abadie	(substituted off) 33'
BF	6	Tomás Leonardi
RL	5	Patricio Albacete
LL	4	Esteban Lozada	(substituted off) 55'
TP	3	Martín Scelzo	(substituted off) 66'
HK	2	Mario Ledesma
LP	1	Rodrigo Roncero
Replacements:
HK	16	Alberto Vernet Basualdo
PR	17	Marcos Ayerza	(substituted on) 66'
LK	18	Manuel Carizza	(substituted on) 55'
FL	19	Alejandro Campos	(substituted on) 33'
SH	20	Agustín Figuerola	(substituted on) 75'
FH	21	Benjamín Urdapilleta
WG	22	Federico Martín Aramburú
Coach:
(Argentina) Santiago Phelan

14 November 2009
14:30 BT/GMT+0 (UTC+0)

Scotland	23–10	Fiji
Try: Beattie 21' c Morrison 51' c Con: Godman (2/2); Pen: Godman (3/4) 14', 28', 34'	Report	Try: Goneva 38' c Con: Little (1/1); Pen: Little (1/2) 63'

Murrayfield Stadium, Edinburgh
Attendance: 21,826
Referee: Chris White (England)

FB	15	Rory Lamont
RW	14	Sean Lamont
OC	13	Alex Grove
IC	12	Graeme Morrison
LW	11	Simon Danielli
FH	10	Phil Godman
SH	9	Chris Cusiter (c)
N8	8	Johnnie Beattie
OF	7	John Barclay
BF	6	Alasdair Strokosch
RL	5	Alastair Kellock
LL	4	Nathan Hines
TP	3	Moray Low
HK	2	Ross Ford
LP	1	Allan Jacobsen
Replacements:
HK	16	Dougie Hall
PR	17	Kyle Traynor
LK	18	Jason White
N8	19	Richie Vernon
SH	20	Mike Blair
CE	21	Chris Paterson
FB	22	Nick De Luca
Coach:
(England) Andy Robinson

FB	15	Josh Matavesi
RW	14	Vereniki Goneva
OC	13	Gabiriele Lovobalavu
IC	12	Seremaia Bai (c)
LW	11	Napolioni Nalaga
FH	10	Nicky Little
SH	9	Mosese Rauluni
N8	8	Asaeli Boko
BF	7	Akapusi Qera
OF	6	Josefa Domolailai
RL	5	Ifereimi Rawaqa
LL	4	Wame Lewaravu
TP	3	Deacon Manu
HK	2	Viliame Veikoso
LP	1	Alefoso Yalayalatabua
Replacements:
HK	16	Graham Dewes
PR	17	Sireli Ledua
LK	18	Leone Nakarawa
N8	19	Samu Bola
SH	20	Waisale Vatuvoka
FH	21	Jonetani Ratu
FB	22	Nasoni Roko
Coach:
(Australia) Glen Ella

15 November 2009
14:00 JST (UTC+09)

Japan	46–8	Canada
Try: Leitch 9' m Kikutani 37' c Aruga 39' c Tupuailei 48' c Onozawa 51' c Horie 75' c Con: Webb (4/5); Arlidge (1/1); Pen: Webb (2/3) 20', 23'		Try: Hirayama 79' m Pen: Pritchard (1/2) 17'

Yurtec Stadium Sendai, Miyagi
Attendance: 6,164
Referee: Keith Brown (New Zealand)

- Japan's victory saw them achieve their highest ever spot on the IRB World Rankings.

15 November 2009
15:00 IST/GMT+0 (UTC+0)

Ireland	20–20	Australia
Try: Bowe 57' c O'Driscoll 79' c Con: O'Gara (2/2); Pen: O'Gara (2/2) 5', 21'	Report	Try: Mitchell 2' c Elsom 62' c Con: Giteau (2/2); Pen: Giteau (2/4) 24', 54'

Croke Park, Dublin
Attendance: 69,886
Referee: Jonathan Kaplan (South Africa)

FB	15	Rob Kearney
RW	14	Tommy Bowe
OC	13	Brian O'Driscoll (c)
IC	12	Paddy Wallace
LW	11	Luke Fitzgerald	(substituted off) 53'
FH	10	Ronan O'Gara
SH	9	Tomás O'Leary
N8	8	Jamie Heaslip
OF	7	David Wallace	63' to 65'
BF	6	Stephen Ferris	(substituted off) 75'
RL	5	Paul O'Connell
LL	4	Donncha O'Callaghan
TP	3	John Hayes
HK	2	Jerry Flannery
LP	1	Cian Healy
Replacements:
HK	16	Seán Cronin
PR	17	Tom Court
LK	18	Leo Cullen
FL	19	Denis Leamy	(substituted on) 63'	(substituted off) 65'	(substituted on) 75'
SH	20	Eoin Reddan
FH	21	Johnny Sexton
WG	22	Keith Earls	(substituted on) 53'
Coach:
(Ireland) Declan Kidney

FB	15	Adam Ashley-Cooper	(substituted off) 69'
RW	14	Peter Hynes
OC	13	Digby Ioane
IC	12	Quade Cooper
LW	11	Drew Mitchell
FH	10	Matt Giteau
SH	9	Will Genia
N8	8	Wycliff Palu	(yellow card) 29' to 39'
OF	7	David Pocock	20' to 28'
BF	6	Rocky Elsom (c)
RL	5	Mark Chisholm
LL	4	James Horwill
TP	3	Ben Alexander
HK	2	Stephen Moore	(substituted off) 64'
LP	1	Benn Robinson
Replacements:
HK	16	Tatafu Polota-Nau	(substituted on) 64'
PR	17	Matt Dunning
LK	18	Dean Mumm
FL	19	George Smith	(substituted on) 20'	(substituted off) 28'
SH	20	Luke Burgess
FH	21	Ryan Cross
FB	22	James O'Connor	(substituted on) 69'
Coach:
(New Zealand) Robbie Deans

- Ireland captain Brian O'Driscoll became the 11th player to reach 100 Test caps.

=== Week 4 ===
20 November 2009
19:00 CET/GMT+01 (UTC+01)

Italy A	8–7	Georgia

Stadio Bruseschi, Palmanova
Referee: Peter Fitzgibbon (Ireland)

20 November 2009
19:30 BT/GMT+0 (UTC+0)

Scotland A	38–7	Tonga
	Report

Netherdale, Galashiels
Referee: Alan Lewis (Ireland)

21 November 2009
14:05 JST (UTC+09)

Japan	27–6	Canada
Try: Aruga 9' m Hatakeyama 20' c Leitch 48' c Goromaru 72' m Con: Nicholas (1/3); Webb (1/1); Pen: Webb (1/2) 21'	Report	Pen: Pritchard (1/1) 23'; Monro (1/1) 46'

Prince Chichibu Memorial Ground, Tokyo
Attendance: 10,175
Referee: Vinny Munro (New Zealand)

21 November 2009
15:00 CET/GMT+01 (UTC+01)

Italy	10–32	South Africa
Try: Garcia 31' c Con: Gower; Pen: Gower 59'	Report	Try: Habana 5' m Fourie 13' c Du Preez 52' c Olivier 72' c Con: Steyn (2); Pienaar; Pen: Steyn (2) 46', 64'

Stadio Friuli, Udine
Attendance: 31,482
Referee: Alain Rolland (Ireland)

21 November 2009
14:30 BT/GMT+0 (UTC+0)

England	6–19	New Zealand
Pen: Wilkinson (2/2) 15', 25'	Report	Try: Cowan 56' c Con: Carter (1/1); Pen: Carter (4/6) 23', 29', 46', 67'

Twickenham Stadium, London
Attendance: 80,676
Referee: Jonathan Kaplan (South Africa)

FB	15	Mark Cueto
RW	14	Ugo Monye
OC	13	Dan Hipkiss
IC	12	Ayoola Erinle	(substituted off) 63'
LW	11	Matt Banahan	(substituted off) 72'
FH	10	Jonny Wilkinson
SH	9	Paul Hodgson	(substituted off) 70'
N8	8	James Haskell
OF	7	Lewis Moody
BF	6	Joe Worsley	(substituted off) 2'
RL	5	Steve Borthwick (c)
LL	4	Simon Shaw	(substituted off) 65'
TP	3	Duncan Bell	(substituted off) 51'
HK	2	Dylan Hartley	(substituted off) 49'
LP	1	Tim Payne
Replacements:
HK	16	Steve Thompson	(substituted on) 49'
PR	17	David Wilson	(substituted on) 51'
LK	18	Louis Deacon	(substituted on) 65'
FL	19	Tom Croft	(substituted on) 2'
SH	20	Danny Care	(substituted on) 70'
CE	21	Shane Geraghty	(substituted on) 63'
WG	22	Mathew Tait	(substituted on) 72'
Coach:
(England) Martin Johnson

FB	15	Mils Muliaina
RW	14	Zac Guildford
OC	13	Conrad Smith
IC	12	Ma'a Nonu
LW	11	Sitiveni Sivivatu
FH	10	Dan Carter
SH	9	Jimmy Cowan	(substituted off) 71'
N8	8	Kieran Read
OF	7	Richie McCaw (c)
BF	6	Adam Thomson	(substituted off) 58'
RL	5	Tom Donnelly	(substituted off) 58'
LL	4	Brad Thorn
TP	3	Owen Franks	(substituted off) 58'
HK	2	Andrew Hore
LP	1	Tony Woodcock
Replacements:
HK	16	Aled de Malmanche
PR	17	John Afoa	(substituted on) 58'
LK	18	Anthony Boric	(substituted on) 58'
FL	19	Jerome Kaino	(substituted on) 58'
SH	20	Andy Ellis	(substituted on) 71'
FH	21	Stephen Donald
CE	22	Tamati Ellison
Coach:
(New Zealand) Graham Henry

- Dan Carter became the all-time leading Test point scorer for the All Blacks, surpassing Andrew Mehrtens.

21 November 2009
14:30 BT/GMT+0 (UTC+0)

Wales	33–16	Argentina
	Report

Millennium Stadium, Cardiff
Attendance: 60,974
Referee: George Clancy (Ireland)

FB	15	James Hook
RW	14	Leigh Halfpenny
OC	13	Jamie Roberts
IC	12	Jonathan Davies
LW	11	Shane Williams
FH	10	Stephen Jones
SH	9	Gareth Cooper
N8	8	Ryan Jones (c)
OF	7	Martyn Williams
BF	6	Andy Powell
RL	5	Luke Charteris
LL	4	Alun Wyn Jones
TP	3	Paul James
HK	2	Matthew Rees
LP	1	Gethin Jenkins
Replacements:
HK	16	Huw Bennett
PR	17	Duncan Jones
LK	18	Jonathan Thomas
FL	19	Dan Lydiate
SH	20	Dwayne Peel
CE	21	Andrew Bishop
WG	22	Tom James
Coach:
(New Zealand) Warren Gatland

FB	15	Horacio Agulla
RW	14	Lucas Borges
OC	13	Gonzalo Tiesi
IC	12	Martín Rodríguez
LW	11	Mauro Comuzzi
FH	10	Santiago Fernández
SH	9	Agustín Figuerola
N8	8	Juan Martín Fernández Lobbe (c)
OF	7	Alejandro Abadie
BF	6	Tomás Leonardi
RL	5	Patricio Albacete
LL	4	Mariano Sambucetti
TP	3	Martín Scelzo
HK	2	Mario Ledesma
LP	1	Rodrigo Roncero
Replacements:
HK	16	Alberto Vernet Basualdo
PR	17	Marcos Ayerza
LK	18	Manuel Carizza
N8	19	Alejandro Campos
SH	20	Alfredo Lalanne
FH	21	Benjamín Urdapilleta
WG	22	Horacio San Martín
Coach:
(Argentina) Santiago Phelan

Assistant referees:
Christophe Berdos (France)
David Changleng (Scotland)
Television match official:
Jim Yuille (Scotland)

21 November 2009
15:00 WET/GMT+0 (UTC+0)

Portugal	13–24	Argentina XV
	Report

Estádio Universitário, Lisbon
Referee: Stuart Dickinson (Australia)

21 November 2009
18:00 CET/GMT+01 (UTC+01)

France	43–5	Samoa
	Report

Stade de France, Saint-Denis
Attendance: 67,834
Referee: Dave Pearson (England)

21 November 2009
17:15 IST/GMT+0 (UTC+0)

Ireland	41–6	Fiji
Try: Earls (2) 18' c, 62' c O'Driscoll 45' c Kearney 67' c Horgan 76' c Con: Sexton (5/5); Pen: Sexton (2/2) 9', 40'	Report	Pen: Little (2/3) 27', 43'

RDS Arena, Dublin
Attendance: 16,500
Referee: Marius Jonker (South Africa)

FB	15	Rob Kearney
RW	14	Shane Horgan
OC	13	Brian O'Driscoll (c)
IC	12	Gordon D'Arcy
LW	11	Keith Earls
FH	10	Johnny Sexton
SH	9	Eoin Reddan
N8	8	Jamie Heaslip
OF	7	Denis Leamy
BF	6	Stephen Ferris
RL	5	Paul O'Connell
LL	4	Leo Cullen
TP	3	John Hayes
HK	2	Jerry Flannery
LP	1	Tom Court
Replacements:
HK	16	Seán Cronin
PR	17	Tony Buckley
LK	18	Donncha O'Callaghan
N8	19	Seán O'Brien
SH	20	Tomás O'Leary
FH	21	Paddy Wallace
FB	22	Andrew Trimble
Coach:
(Ireland) Declan Kidney

FB	15	Norman Ligairi
RW	14	Vereniki Goneva
OC	13	Gabiriele Lovobalavu
IC	12	Seremaia Bai (c)
LW	11	Nasoni Roko
FH	10	Nicky Little
SH	9	Mosese Rauluni
N8	8	Asaeli Boko
OF	7	Akapusi Qera
BF	6	Apolosi Satala
RL	5	Ifereimi Rawaqa
LL	4	Wame Lewaravu
TP	3	Viliame Seuseu
HK	2	Viliame Veikoso
LP	1	Aisake Tarogi
Replacements:
HK	16	Isireli Ledua
PR	17	Graham Dewes
LK	18	Leone Nakarawa
N8	19	Samu Bola
SH	20	Waisale Vatuvoka
FH	21	Josh Matavesi
WG	22	Timoci Nagusa
Coach:
(Australia) Glen Ella

21 November 2009
17:15 BT/GMT+0 (UTC+0)

Scotland	9–8	Australia
Pen: Godman (2/3) 27', 56'; Drop: Paterson (1/1) 75'	Report	Try: Cross 80' m Pen: Giteau (1/3) 4'

Murrayfield Stadium, Edinburgh
Attendance: 44,762
Referee: Romain Poite (France)

FB	15	Rory Lamont
RW	14	Sean Lamont
OC	13	Alex Grove
IC	12	Graeme Morrison	(substituted off) 40'
LW	11	Simon Danielli	(substituted off) 63'
FH	10	Phil Godman
SH	9	Chris Cusiter (c)	(substituted off) 20'
N8	8	Johnnie Beattie	(substituted off) 63'
OF	7	John Barclay
BF	6	Alasdair Strokosch	(substituted off) 47'
RL	5	Alastair Kellock
LL	4	Nathan Hines
TP	3	Moray Low	(substituted off) 57'
HK	2	Ross Ford	(substituted off) 76'
LP	1	Allan Jacobsen
Replacements:
HK	16	Dougie Hall	(substituted on) 76'
PR	17	Kyle Traynor	(substituted on) 57'
FL	18	Jason White	(substituted on) 47'
N8	19	Richie Vernon	(substituted on) 63'
SH	20	Rory Lawson	(substituted on) 20'
FB	21	Chris Paterson	(substituted on) 63'
CE	22	Nick De Luca	(substituted on) 40'
Coach:
(England) Andy Robinson

FB	15	Adam Ashley-Cooper
RW	14	Peter Hynes
OC	13	Ryan Cross
IC	12	Quade Cooper	(substituted off) 73'
LW	11	Drew Mitchell
FH	10	Matt Giteau
SH	9	Will Genia	(substituted off) 63'
N8	8	Wycliff Palu	(substituted off) 66'
OF	7	George Smith
BF	6	Rocky Elsom (c)
RL	5	Mark Chisholm	(substituted off) 49'
LL	4	James Horwill
TP	3	Ben Alexander
HK	2	Stephen Moore	(substituted off) 45'
LP	1	Benn Robinson	(substituted off) 16'
Replacements:
HK	16	Tatafu Polota-Nau	(substituted on) 45'
PR	17	Sekope Kepu	(substituted on) 16'
LK	18	Dean Mumm	(substituted on) 49'
N8	19	Richard Brown	(substituted on) 66'
SH	20	Luke Burgess	(substituted on) 63'
WG	21	Lachie Turner
CE	22	James O'Connor	(substituted on) 73'
Coach:
(New Zealand) Robbie Deans

=== Week 5 ===
27 November 2009
19:30 IST/GMT+0 (UTC+0)

Ireland A	31–0	Argentina XV
	Report

Tallaght Stadium, Dublin
Attendance: 4,016
Referee: Peter Allan (Scotland)

28 November 2009
15:00 CET/GMT+01 (UTC+01)

Italy	24–6	Samoa
Try: McLean 7' m Penalty try 77' c Con: Mi.Bergamasco (1/2); Pen: Mi.Bergamasco (2/2) 7', 21'; Gower 37' c Drop: Tebaldi 50'	Report	Pen: Esau (2/4) 12', 40'

Stadio Cino e Lillo Del Duca, Ascoli Piceno
Attendance: 17,110
Referee: Christophe Berdos (France)

- This was Italy's first win since June 2008, ending a 13-game losing streak.

28 November 2009
14:30 IST/GMT+0 (UTC+0)

Ireland	15–10	South Africa
Pen: Sexton (5/7) 10', 30', 48', 52', 68'	Report	Try: Burger 16' c Con: Steyn (1/1); Drop: Steyn (1/2) 24'

Croke Park, Dublin
Attendance: 74,950
Referee: Nigel Owens (Wales)

FB	15	Rob Kearney
RW	14	Tommy Bowe
OC	13	Brian O'Driscoll (c)
IC	12	Paddy Wallace
LW	11	Keith Earls
FH	10	Johnny Sexton
SH	9	Tomás O'Leary
N8	8	Jamie Heaslip
OF	7	David Wallace
BF	6	Stephen Ferris
RL	5	Paul O'Connell
LL	4	Donncha O'Callaghan
TP	3	John Hayes
HK	2	Jerry Flannery
LP	1	Cian Healy
Replacements:
HK	16	Seán Cronin
PR	17	Tony Buckley
LK	18	Leo Cullen
FL	19	Seán O'Brien
SH	20	Peter Stringer
FH	21	Ronan O'Gara
FB	22	Gordon D'Arcy
Coach:
(Ireland) Declan Kidney

FB	15	Zane Kirchner
RW	14	JP Pietersen
OC	13	Jaque Fourie
IC	12	Wynand Olivier
LW	11	Bryan Habana
FH	10	Morné Steyn
SH	9	Fourie du Preez
N8	8	Danie Rossouw
BF	7	Schalk Burger
OF	6	Heinrich Brüssow
RL	5	Victor Matfield
LL	4	Bakkies Botha
TP	3	BJ Botha
HK	2	John Smit (c)
LP	1	Tendai Mtawarira
Replacements:
HK	16	Bismarck du Plessis
PR	17	CJ van der Linde
LK	18	Andries Bekker
FL	19	Jean Deysel
FL	20	Dewald Potgieter
FH	21	Ruan Pienaar
FB	22	Jean de Villiers
Coach:
(South Africa) Peter de Villiers

28 November 2009
14:30 BT/GMT+0 (UTC+0)

Scotland	6–9	Argentina
	Report

Murrayfield Stadium, Edinburgh
Attendance: 30,000
Referee: Alan Lewis (Ireland)

FB	15	Rory Lamont
RW	14	Sean Lamont
OC	13	Ben Cairns
IC	12	Alex Grove
LW	11	Thom Evans
FH	10	Phil Godman
SH	9	Chris Cusiter (c)
N8	8	Johnnie Beattie
OF	7	Alan MacDonald
BF	6	Alasdair Strokosch
RL	5	Alastair Kellock
LL	4	Nathan Hines
TP	3	Moray Low
HK	2	Ross Ford
LP	1	Allan Jacobsen
Replacements:
HK	16	Dougie Hall
PR	17	Kyle Traynor
LK	18	Jason White
N8	19	Richie Vernon
SH	20	Rory Lawson
FH	21	Chris Paterson
CE	22	Nick De Luca
Coach:
(England) Andy Robinson

FB	15	Horacio Agulla
RW	14	Lucas Borges
OC	13	Gonzalo Tiesi
IC	12	Martín Rodríguez
LW	11	Federico Martín Aramburú
FH	10	Santiago Fernández
SH	9	Alfredo Lalanne
N8	8	Juan Martín Fernández Lobbe (c)
BF	7	Alejandro Abadie
OF	6	Alejandro Campos
RL	5	Patricio Albacete
LL	4	Manuel Carizza
TP	3	Martín Scelzo
HK	2	Alberto Vernet Basualdo
LP	1	Marcos Ayerza
Replacements:
HK	16	Agustín Creevy
PR	17	Rodrigo Roncero
LK	18	Esteban Lozada
N8	19	Tomás Leonardi
SH	20	Agustín Figuerola
FH	21	Benjamín Urdapilleta
FB	22	Horacio San Martín
Coach:
(Argentina) Santiago Phelan

28 November 2009
15:00 WET/GMT+0 (UTC+0)

Portugal	19–24	Tonga

Estádio Universitário, Lisbon
Referee: James Jones (Wales)

28 November 2009
17:15 BT/GMT+0 (UTC+0)

Wales	12–33	Australia
Pen: S. Jones (3/4) 21', 30', 40'; Halfpenny (1/1) 17'	Report	Try: Ioane 7' m Horwill 19' m Pocock 24' c Polota-Nau 62' c Con: Giteau (2/4); Pen: Giteau (3/3) 2', 31', 57'

Millennium Stadium, Cardiff
Referee: Wayne Barnes (England)

FB	15	James Hook
RW	14	Leigh Halfpenny	(substituted off) 28'
OC	13	Jamie Roberts
IC	12	Jonathan Davies
LW	11	Shane Williams	(substituted off) 5'
FH	10	Stephen Jones
SH	9	Dwayne Peel	10' to 15'		(substituted off) 72'
N8	8	Andy Powell		60' to 65'
OF	7	Martyn Williams
BF	6	Dan Lydiate	48' to 60'		(substituted off) 65'
RL	5	Luke Charteris	(substituted off) 49'
LL	4	Alun Wyn Jones
TP	3	Paul James	(substituted off) 48'
HK	2	Matthew Rees	(substituted off) 30'
LP	1	Gethin Jenkins (c)
Replacements:
HK	16	Huw Bennett	(substituted on) 30'
PR	17	Duncan Jones	(substituted on) 48'
LK	18	Jonathan Thomas	(substituted on) 49'
FL	19	Sam Warburton	(substituted on) 48'
SH	20	Martin Roberts	(substituted on) 10'	(substituted off) 15'	(substituted on) 72'
CE	21	Andrew Bishop	(substituted on) 28'
WG	22	Tom James	(substituted on) 5'
Coach:
(New Zealand) Warren Gatland

FB	15	Adam Ashley-Cooper
RW	14	Peter Hynes	(substituted off) 64'
OC	13	Digby Ioane
IC	12	Quade Cooper
LW	11	Drew Mitchell	(substituted off) 70'
FH	10	Matt Giteau
SH	9	Will Genia	(substituted off) 79'
N8	8	Wycliff Palu	(substituted off) 70'
OF	7	David Pocock	(substituted off) 40'
BF	6	Rocky Elsom (c)
RL	5	Dean Mumm
LL	4	James Horwill
TP	3	Ben Alexander	(substituted off) 73'
HK	2	Stephen Moore	(substituted off) 55'
LP	1	Benn Robinson
Replacements:
HK	16	Tatafu Polota-Nau	(substituted on) 55'
PR	17	Matt Dunning	(substituted on) 73'
N8	18	Mark Chisholm	(substituted on) 70'
FL	19	George Smith	(substituted on) 40'
SH	20	Luke Burgess	(substituted on) 79'
WG	21	James O'Connor	(substituted on) 64'
WG	22	Kurtley Beale	(substituted on) 70'
Coach:
(New Zealand) Robbie Deans

28 November 2009
19:15 EET/GMT+02 (UTC+02)

Romania	18–29	Fiji

Stadionul Naţional de Rugby, Bucharest

28 November 2009
20:45 CET/GMT+01 (UTC+01)

France	12–39	New Zealand
Pen: Dupuy (3/5) 3', 16', 20'; Drop: Trinh-Duc (1/1) 36'	Report	Try: Sivivatu 7' c Muliaina 23' m Kaino 34' c Jane 65' c Smith 77' c Con: Carter (4/5) 8', 35', 65', 79'; Pen: Carter (2/2) 30', 54'

Stade Vélodrome, Marseille
Attendance: 60,000
Referee: Alain Rolland (Ireland)

FB	15	Damien Traille
RW	14	Vincent Clerc	(substituted off) 77'
OC	13	David Marty
IC	12	Yannick Jauzion	(substituted off) 63'
LW	11	Maxime Médard
FH	10	François Trinh-Duc
SH	9	Julien Dupuy	(substituted off) 59'
N8	8	Julien Bonnaire
OF	7	Fulgence Ouedraogo	(substituted off) 63'
BF	6	Thierry Dusautoir (c)
RL	5	Romain Millo-Chluski
LL	4	Sébastien Chabal	(substituted off) 52'
TP	3	Sylvain Marconnet	(substituted off) 51'
HK	2	William Servat	(substituted off) 47'
LP	1	Fabien Barcella
Replacements:
HK	16	Dimitri Szarzewski	(substituted on) 47'
PR	17	Nicolas Mas	(substituted on) 51'
LK	18	Lionel Nallet	(substituted on) 52'
FL	19	Julien Puricelli	(substituted on) 63'
SH	20	Morgan Parra	(substituted on) 59'
CE	21	Yann David	(substituted on) 63'
WG	22	Cédric Heymans	(substituted on) 77'
Coach:
(France) Marc Lièvremont

FB	15	Mils Muliaina
RW	14	Cory Jane
OC	13	Conrad Smith
IC	12	Ma'a Nonu	(substituted off) 71'
LW	11	Sitiveni Sivivatu
FH	10	Dan Carter	(substituted off) 77'
SH	9	Jimmy Cowan	(substituted off) 75'
N8	8	Kieran Read
OF	7	Richie McCaw (c)
BF	6	Jerome Kaino
RL	5	Tom Donnelly
LL	4	Brad Thorn	(substituted off) 65'
TP	3	Neemia Tialata	(substituted off) 65'
HK	2	Andrew Hore	(substituted off) 74'
LP	1	Tony Woodcock
Replacements:
HK	16	Corey Flynn	(substituted on) 74'
PR	17	Owen Franks	(substituted on) 65'
LK	18	Anthony Boric	(substituted on) 65'
FL	19	Tanerau Latimer
SH	20	Andy Ellis	(substituted on) 75'
FH	21	Stephen Donald	(substituted on) 77'
CE	22	Luke McAlister	(substituted on) 71'
Coach:
(New Zealand) Graham Henry

28 November 2009
14:00 PST (UTC-08)

Canada	22–6	Russia
	Report

Swangard Stadium, Burnaby
Attendance: 4,200
Referee: Chris Henshall (United States)

=== Week 6 ===
5 December 2009
14:30 BT/GMT+0 (UTC+0)

Barbarians	25–18	New Zealand
Try: Habana (3) 10' c, 40' c, 68' m Con: Giteau (2/3) 10', 40'; Pen: Giteau; M. Steyn	Report	Try: B. Smith 23' c Boric 67' m Con: Donald (1/2) 23'; Pen: Donald; Delany

Twickenham Stadium, London
Attendance: 63,554
Referee: Christophe Berdos (France)

FB	15	(Australia) Drew Mitchell
RW	14	(New Zealand) Joe Rokocoko
OC	13	(South Africa) Jaque Fourie
IC	12	(Wales) Jamie Roberts
LW	11	(South Africa) Bryan Habana
FH	10	(Australia) Matt Giteau
SH	9	(South Africa) Fourie du Preez
N8	8	(Australia) Rocky Elsom
OF	7	(Australia) George Smith
BF	6	(South Africa) Schalk Burger
RL	5	(South Africa) Victor Matfield (c)
LL	4	(Italy) Carlo Del Fava
TP	3	(South Africa) W. P. Nel
HK	2	(South Africa) Bismarck du Plessis
LP	1	(Italy) Salvatore Perugini
Replacements:
HK	16	(Australia) Stephen Moore
PR	17	(South Africa) Tendai Mtawarira
LK	18	(Italy) Quintin Geldenhuys
N8	19	(Wales) Andy Powell
SH	20	(Australia) Will Genia
FB	21	(South Africa) Morné Steyn
WG	22	(Wales) Leigh Halfpenny
Coach:
(South Africa) Nick Mallett

FB	15	Cory Jane
RW	14	Ben Smith
OC	13	Tamati Ellison
IC	12	Luke McAlister
LW	11	Zac Guildford
FH	10	Stephen Donald
SH	9	Brendon Leonard
N8	8	Rodney So'oialo
OF	7	Richie McCaw (c)
BF	6	Liam Messam
RL	5	Anthony Boric
LL	4	Jason Eaton
TP	3	John Afoa
HK	2	Corey Flynn
LP	1	Wyatt Crockett
Replacements:
HK	16	Andrew Hore
PR	17	Neemia Tialata
LK	18	Adam Thomson
FL	19	Tanerau Latimer
SH	20	Jimmy Cowan
FH	21	Mike Delany
WG	22	Sitiveni Sivivatu
Coach:
(New Zealand) Graham Henry

Touch judges:
Romain Poite (France)
David Changleng (Scotland)
Television match official:
Andrew Turner (England) / Graham Hughes (England)

- This was New Zealand's first loss in the Northern Hemisphere since 2007, as well as the first time in two years a team had managed to score tries against them in the Northern Hemisphere.

== See also ==
- Autumn rugby union internationals
