= 2023 Netball World Cup =

International netball tournament in South Africa

Tournament details
- Host country: South Africa
- Dates: 28 July – 6 August 2023
- Teams: 16

Final positions
- Champions: Australia (12th title)
- Runners-up: England
- Third place: Jamaica

Tournament statistics
- Matches played: 60
- Attendance: 120,000 (2,000 per match)
- Top scorer(s): (Jamaica) Jhaniele Fowler (302 goals)

The 2023 Netball World Cup (formerly known as the Vitality Netball World Cup 2023) was the sixteenth staging of the Netball World Cup, the premier competition in international netball, contested every four years. The tournament was held from 28 July to 6 August at the International Convention Centre in Cape Town, South Africa, its first time in Africa.

This marked the tournament's 60th anniversary, as it was founded in 1963.

Sixteen nations contested for the title and after two group stage rounds; England, Jamaica, Australia and New Zealand all made it to the semi-finals, with England qualifying for the final for the first time. Australia would take home their 12th title after defeating England 61–45. Jamaica finished in third place, after defeating New Zealand. Host nation South Africa finished sixth overall.

== Organisation ==
The host city and venue was announced by the International Netball Federation (INF) on 8 March 2019, only months prior to the staging of the 2019 edition in Liverpool, England. Cape Town's bid, supported by the South African Government and the Western Cape province, was selected by the INF ahead of a bid by Auckland, New Zealand. The INF stated the Cape Town bid would "deliver a greater impact on the development of global netball" and cited the pledges by the South African Government to invest heavily in preparation and development of the sport in the lead-up to the tournament.

=== Venue ===
All matches at the event were held at the Cape Town International Convention Centre.

=== Mascot ===
In August 2022, the mascot was revealed for the tournament following a public competition. Designed by 11-year-old Violet Cassidy from Manchester, England; the mascot is an anthropomorphic meerkat named Letsasi, meaning "sun."

== Broadcasters ==
This is a list of the broadcasters for the tournament in competing countries and regions. For the first time in history, the event was recorded and produced by an all women crew from SuperSport (MultiChoice). All other countries not listed below are able to subscribe to NetballPass to watch the tournament.

Country	Broadcaster
Anguilla	Flow Sports
Antigua and Barbuda	Flow Sports
Aruba	Flow Sports
Australia	Fox Netball
Australia	SBS Viceland (semi finals and final)
Bahamas	Flow Sports
Barbados	Flow Sports
Bermuda	Flow Sports
Canada	CBC (semi finals and final only)
Cayman Islands	Flow Sports
Cuba	Flow Sports
Curaçao	Flow Sports
Dominica	Flow Sports
Dominican Republic	Flow Sports
Fiji	Fiji Television
Grenada	Flow Sports
Guyana	Flow Sports
Ireland	Sky Sports
Jamaica	Flow Sports
Malaysia	Astro
Netherlands Antilles	Flow Sports
New Zealand	Sky Sport
Papua New Guinea	EmTV
Saint Kitts and Nevis	Flow Sports
Saint Lucia	Flow Sports
Saint Vincent and the Grenadines	Flow Sports
South Africa	SuperSport
South Africa	SABC
Suriname	Flow Sports
Trinidad and Tobago	Flow Sports
Turks and Caicos Islands	Flow Sports
United Kingdom	Sky Sports
United Kingdom	BBC (July 31 onward)

== Teams ==
Qualified Did not qualify Did not enter

Sixteen teams contested the 2023 title. Six teams qualified automatically: the hosts, and the top five (other) teams in the World Netball Rankings. The remaining ten places were filled via five regional tournaments, with two teams qualifying from each.

Teams which qualified automatically (in order of world ranking):

- Australia
- New Zealand
- Jamaica
- England
- South Africa (hosts)
- Uganda

=== Qualification tournaments ===
Region	Host	Teams	Dates	Qualified	Refs
Oceania	Fiji	5	19–23 July 2022	Tonga; Fiji	
Africa	South Africa	9	21–27 August 2022	Malawi; Zimbabwe	
Asia	Singapore	11	3–11 September 2022	Singapore; Sri Lanka	
Europe	Scotland	6	12–16 October 2022	Scotland; Wales	
Americas	Jamaica	9	16–21 October 2022	Trinidad and Tobago; Barbados	

== Squads ==
The sixteen competing nations selected 12-player squads for the tournament, with three additional reserve players named. Reserve players would be permanent replacements in the event of injury.

== Format ==
The format of the competition was the same as that introduced for the 2019 Netball World Cup. Teams competed in three stages; the Preliminaries Stage One (28–30 July), Preliminaries Stage Two (31 July–3 August) and the Play-offs and Placings matches (4–6 August).

Preliminaries Stage One
There were four groups (A, B, C and D) of four teams in the first stage, with the top eight teams pre-assigned to their groups and one team from the 9th–12th seeds and one from the 13th–16th seeds drawn randomly into each group. No more than two teams from the one region can be drawn into the same group. The top three teams from each group progressed to the second preliminaries stage.

Preliminaries Stage Two
The top three teams from Groups A and B formed Group F, and the top three teams from Groups C and D formed Group G. The bottom four finishers from Groups A-D competed against one another in Group E. Where teams in Groups F and G have already played each other in the Preliminaries Stage One (i.e. A1 has already played A2 and A3), these results will carry through to the Preliminaries Stage Two.

Play-offs and Placings
The teams finishing first and second in Groups F and G went through to the semi-finals, with the top placed team in each group facing the second placed team in the other group. The winners of each semi-final competed for gold in the final, with the losers playing for bronze.

The teams finishing third and fourth in Groups F and G competed for final positions fifth to eighth – third in one group plays fourth in the other – with the winners playing off for fifth place and the losers for seventh. The teams that finished fifth in Groups F and G played off for ninth and 10th places. The teams that finished last in Groups F and G played off for 11th and 12th places. The teams that finished first and second in Group E played off for 13th and 14th place and the teams that finish third and fourth in Group E played off for the 15th and 16th places.

== Umpires ==
Umpire	Association
Bronwen Adams	Australia
Joshua Bowring	Australia
Jemma Cook	Australia
Tara Warner	Australia
Kate Wright	Australia
Angela Armstrong-Lush	New Zealand
Gareth Fowler	New Zealand
Ken Metekingi	New Zealand
Kristie Simpson	New Zealand
Gary Burgess	England
Alison Harrison	Wales
Kate Mann	England
Louise Travis	England
Tracy-Ann Griffiths	Jamaica
Terrence Peart	Jamaica
Anso Kemp	South Africa
Elizna Van den Berg	South Africa

=== Appointment panel ===
Umpire	Association
Heather Gleadall (chair)	England
Sharon Kelly	Australia
David Pala'amo	New Zealand
Marielouw Van der Merwe	South Africa
Anne Abraitis	Scotland
Deborah Lynch	Barbados

== Preliminaries Stage One ==
=== Group A ===
Pos	Team	Pld	W	D	L	GF	GA	%	Pts	Qualification
1	Australia (A)	3	3	0	0	272	100	272	6	Advance to Preliminaries Stage Two
2	Tonga (A)	3	2	0	1	149	182	81.9	4	Advance to Preliminaries Stage Two
3	Fiji (A)	3	1	0	2	135	205	65.9	2	Advance to Preliminaries Stage Two
4	Zimbabwe	3	0	0	3	124	193	64.2	0	

Source: Netball Pass
(A) Advance to a further round

28 July; 9:00 (SAST UTC+2)	Report; Stats	Tonga	56–51	Fiji	Cape Town International Convention Centre Arena 2
28 July; 9:00 (SAST UTC+2)	Report; Stats	Scoring by quarter: 11–16, 15–12, 14–8, 16–15			Cape Town International Convention Centre Arena 2
28 July; 9:00 (SAST UTC+2)	Report; Stats	Palavi 39/41 (95%); Tuivaiti 11/11 (100%); Hansen 6/7 (86%)		Rusivakula 26/30 (87%); Rauluni 25/26 (96%)	Cape Town International Convention Centre Arena 2

28 July; 11:00 (SAST UTC+2)	Report; Stats	Australia	86–30	Zimbabwe	Cape Town International Convention Centre Arena 1
28 July; 11:00 (SAST UTC+2)	Report; Stats	Scoring by quarter: 20–11, 21–7, 21–6, 24–6			Cape Town International Convention Centre Arena 1
28 July; 11:00 (SAST UTC+2)	Report; Stats	Koenen 29/30 (97%); Garbin 27/30 (90%); Austin 18/20 (90%); Wood 12/13 (92%)		Makunde 20/25 (80%); Matura 9/16 (56%); Takaidza 1/1 (100%)	Cape Town International Convention Centre Arena 1

29 July; 9:00 (SAST UTC+2)	Report; Stats	Zimbabwe	48–52	Fiji	Cape Town International Convention Centre Arena 2 Umpires: (Australia) Bronwen Adams, (England) Kate Mann
29 July; 9:00 (SAST UTC+2)	Report; Stats	Scoring by quarter: 14–12, 11–14, 10–17, 13–9			Cape Town International Convention Centre Arena 2 Umpires: (Australia) Bronwen Adams, (England) Kate Mann
29 July; 9:00 (SAST UTC+2)	Report; Stats	Bwanali 10/13 (77%); Matura 8/9 (89%); Muzanenamo 1/2 (50%); Makunde 29/30 (97%)		Rusivakula 24/26 (92%); Rauluni 28/30 (93%)	Cape Town International Convention Centre Arena 2 Umpires: (Australia) Bronwen Adams, (England) Kate Mann

29 July; 11:00 (SAST UTC+2)	Report; Stats	Australia	85–38	Tonga	Cape Town International Convention Centre Arena 1 Umpires: (New Zealand) Angela Armstrong-Lush, (England) Louise Travis
29 July; 11:00 (SAST UTC+2)	Report; Stats	Scoring by quarter: 15–13, 24–6, 24–9, 22–10			Cape Town International Convention Centre Arena 1 Umpires: (New Zealand) Angela Armstrong-Lush, (England) Louise Travis
29 July; 11:00 (SAST UTC+2)	Report; Stats	Garbin 42/46 (91%); Koenen 31/32 (97%); Austin 8/9 (89%); Wood 4/6 (67%)		Palavi 27/31 (87%); Tuivaiti 9/9 (100%); Hansen 2/3 (67%)	Cape Town International Convention Centre Arena 1 Umpires: (New Zealand) Angela Armstrong-Lush, (England) Louise Travis

30 July; 9:00 (SAST UTC+2)	Report; Stats	Australia	101–32	Fiji	Cape Town International Convention Centre Arena 1 Umpires: (New Zealand) Ken Metekingi, (England) Kate Mann
30 July; 9:00 (SAST UTC+2)	Report; Stats	Scoring by quarter: 23–9, 23–9, 26–9, 29–5			Cape Town International Convention Centre Arena 1 Umpires: (New Zealand) Ken Metekingi, (England) Kate Mann
30 July; 9:00 (SAST UTC+2)	Report; Stats	Garbin 54/60 (90%); Koenen 37/37 (100%); Wood 10/11 (91%)		Panapasa 16/17 (94%); Rusivakula 10/11 (91%); Rauluni 4/7 (57%); Kete 2/3 (67%); Lutua-Rusivakula 0/2 (0%)	Cape Town International Convention Centre Arena 1 Umpires: (New Zealand) Ken Metekingi, (England) Kate Mann

30 July; 18:00 (SAST UTC+2)	Report; Stats	Tonga	55–46	Zimbabwe	Cape Town International Convention Centre Arena 2 Umpires: (England) Alison Harrison, (Australia) Joshua Bowring
30 July; 18:00 (SAST UTC+2)	Report; Stats	Scoring by quarter: 14–11, 13–13, 15–9, 13–13			Cape Town International Convention Centre Arena 2 Umpires: (England) Alison Harrison, (Australia) Joshua Bowring
30 July; 18:00 (SAST UTC+2)	Report; Stats	Hansen 10/11 (91%); U. Palavi 39/42 (93%); B. Palavi 2/2 (100%); Tuivaiti 4/4 (100%)		Bwanali 15/16 (94%); Takaidza 16/20 (80%); Matura 4/5 (80%); Makunde 11/11 (100%)	Cape Town International Convention Centre Arena 2 Umpires: (England) Alison Harrison, (Australia) Joshua Bowring

=== Group B ===
Pos	Team	Pld	W	D	L	GF	GA	%	Pts	Qualification
1	England (A)	3	3	0	0	214	105	203.8	6	Advance to Preliminaries Stage Two
2	Malawi (A)	3	2	0	1	178	159	111.9	4	Advance to Preliminaries Stage Two
3	Scotland (A)	3	1	0	2	139	161	86.3	2	Advance to Preliminaries Stage Two
4	Barbados	3	0	0	3	121	227	53.3	0	

Source: Netball Pass
(A) Advance to a further round

28 July; 20:00 (SAST UTC+2)	Report; Stats	England	90–29	Barbados	Cape Town International Convention Centre Arena 1
28 July; 20:00 (SAST UTC+2)	Report; Stats	Scoring by quarter: 20–8, 22–10, 23–4, 25–7			Cape Town International Convention Centre Arena 1
28 July; 20:00 (SAST UTC+2)	Report; Stats	Tchine 36/44 (82%); Cardwell 31/35 (89%); Housby 16/16 (100%); Metcalf 7/9 (78%)		Agard 3/4 (75%); Blackman 12/15 (80%); Corbin 13/17 (76%); Walrond 1/1 (100%)	Cape Town International Convention Centre Arena 1

28 July; 20:00 (SAST UTC+2)	Report; Stats	Malawi	55–49	Scotland	Cape Town International Convention Centre Arena 2
28 July; 20:00 (SAST UTC+2)	Report; Stats	Scoring by quarter: 9–17, 13–12, 13–12, 20–8			Cape Town International Convention Centre Arena 2
28 July; 20:00 (SAST UTC+2)	Report; Stats	Mvula 38/38 (100%); Kumwenda 15/15 (100%); Chimaliro 2/2 (100%)		Goodwin 32/36 (89%); McCall 17/19 (89%)	Cape Town International Convention Centre Arena 2

29 July; 16:00 (SAST UTC+2)	Report; Stats	Scotland	53–44	Barbados	Cape Town International Convention Centre Arena 2 Umpires: (New Zealand) Ken Metekingi, (Australia) Jemma Cook
29 July; 16:00 (SAST UTC+2)	Report; Stats	Scoring by quarter: 11–8, 12–15, 15–10, 15–11			Cape Town International Convention Centre Arena 2 Umpires: (New Zealand) Ken Metekingi, (Australia) Jemma Cook
29 July; 16:00 (SAST UTC+2)	Report; Stats	Barrie 12/15 (80%); McCall 29/31 (94%); Goodwin 13/19 (68%)		Blackman 20/22 (91%); Corbin 24/27 (89%)	Cape Town International Convention Centre Arena 2 Umpires: (New Zealand) Ken Metekingi, (Australia) Jemma Cook

29 July; 18:00 (SAST UTC+2)	Report; Stats	England	62–39	Malawi	Cape Town International Convention Centre Arena 1 Umpires: (England) Alison Harrison, (Australia) Tara Warner
29 July; 18:00 (SAST UTC+2)	Report; Stats	Scoring by quarter: 12–10, 17–10, 19–9, 14–10			Cape Town International Convention Centre Arena 1 Umpires: (England) Alison Harrison, (Australia) Tara Warner
29 July; 18:00 (SAST UTC+2)	Report; Stats	Tchine 12/13 (92%); Metcalf 2/2 (100%); Caldwell 31/34 (91%); Housby 17/17 (100%)		Mvula 19/23 (83%); Kumwenda 8/10 (80%); Chimaliro 11/13 (85%); Simtowe 1/3 (33%)	Cape Town International Convention Centre Arena 1 Umpires: (England) Alison Harrison, (Australia) Tara Warner

30 July; 11:00 (SAST UTC+2)	Report; Stats	Malawi	84–48	Barbados	Cape Town International Convention Centre Arena 2 Umpires: (England) Louise Travis, (Australia) Kate Wright
30 July; 11:00 (SAST UTC+2)	Report; Stats	Scoring by quarter: 20–10, 23–12, 21–13, 20–13			Cape Town International Convention Centre Arena 2 Umpires: (England) Louise Travis, (Australia) Kate Wright
30 July; 11:00 (SAST UTC+2)	Report; Stats	Kumwenda 42/47 (89%); Simtowe 5/7 (71%); Mvula 37/38 (97%)		Blackman 14/15 (93%); Corbin 32/33 (97%); Holder 2/2 (100%)	Cape Town International Convention Centre Arena 2 Umpires: (England) Louise Travis, (Australia) Kate Wright

30 July; 16:00 (SAST UTC+2)	Report; Stats	England	62–37	Scotland	Cape Town International Convention Centre Arena 1 Umpires: (New Zealand) Gareth Fowler, (New Zealand) Kristie Simpson
30 July; 16:00 (SAST UTC+2)	Report; Stats	Scoring by quarter: 14–9, 17–9, 15–11, 16–8			Cape Town International Convention Centre Arena 1 Umpires: (New Zealand) Gareth Fowler, (New Zealand) Kristie Simpson
30 July; 16:00 (SAST UTC+2)	Report; Stats	Housby 12/13 (92%); Tchine 31/34 (91%); Metcalf 5/7 (71%); Cardwell 14/15 (93%)		Cairns 4/5 (80%); Goodwin 11/15 (73%); McCall 16/19 (84%); Barrie 6/8 (75%)	Cape Town International Convention Centre Arena 1 Umpires: (New Zealand) Gareth Fowler, (New Zealand) Kristie Simpson

=== Group C ===
Pos	Team	Pld	W	D	L	GF	GA	%	Pts	Qualification
1	Jamaica (A)	3	3	0	0	247	114	216.7	6	Advance to Preliminaries Stage Two
2	South Africa (H, A)	3	2	0	1	197	149	132.2	4	Advance to Preliminaries Stage Two
3	Wales (A)	3	1	0	2	158	192	82.3	2	Advance to Preliminaries Stage Two
4	Sri Lanka	3	0	0	3	113	260	43.5	0	

Source: Netball Pass
(A) Advance to a further round; (H) Host

28 July; 18:00 (SAST UTC+2)	Report; Stats	South Africa	61–50	Wales	Cape Town International Convention Centre Arena 1
28 July; 18:00 (SAST UTC+2)	Report; Stats	Scoring by quarter: 18–9, 14–15, 15–13, 14–13			Cape Town International Convention Centre Arena 1
28 July; 18:00 (SAST UTC+2)	Report; Stats	Venter 43/47 (91%); Taljaard 8/9 (89%) van der Berg 10/16 (63%)		Rowe 29/31 (94%); Yarranton 16/19 (84%); Kuti 5/6 (83%)	Cape Town International Convention Centre Arena 1

28 July; 18:00 (SAST UTC+2)	Report; Stats	Jamaica	105–25	Sri Lanka	Cape Town International Convention Centre Arena 2
28 July; 18:00 (SAST UTC+2)	Report; Stats	Scoring by quarter: 26–5, 26–6, 23–7, 30–7			Cape Town International Convention Centre Arena 2
28 July; 18:00 (SAST UTC+2)	Report; Stats	Fowler 42/43 (98%); Robinson 15/21 (71%); Aiken 33/34 (97%); Beckford 15/19 (79%)		Sivalingam 1/1 (100%); Wannithilake 3/7 (43%); Alwis 4/6 (67%); Algama 17/22 (77%)	Cape Town International Convention Centre Arena 2

29 July; 11:00 (SAST UTC+2)	Report; Stats	Jamaica	75–40	Wales	Cape Town International Convention Centre Arena 2 Umpires: (Australia) Joshua Bowring, (New Zealand) Gareth Fowler
29 July; 11:00 (SAST UTC+2)	Report; Stats	Scoring by quarter: 23–11, 21–12, 14–6, 17–11			Cape Town International Convention Centre Arena 2 Umpires: (Australia) Joshua Bowring, (New Zealand) Gareth Fowler
29 July; 11:00 (SAST UTC+2)	Report; Stats	Aiken 19/22 (86%); Robinson 12/14 (86%); Beckford 5/6 (83%); Fowler 39/41 (95%)		Watkins 9/10 (90%); Matthewman 4/10 (40%); Yarranton 9/12 (75%); Kuti 5/6 (83%); Rowe 13/16 (81%)	Cape Town International Convention Centre Arena 2 Umpires: (Australia) Joshua Bowring, (New Zealand) Gareth Fowler

29 July; 16:00 (SAST UTC+2)	Report; Stats	South Africa	87–32	Sri Lanka	Cape Town International Convention Centre Arena 1 Umpires: (New Zealand) Kristie Simpson, (Jamaica) Terrence Peart
29 July; 16:00 (SAST UTC+2)	Report; Stats	Scoring by quarter: 24–9, 21–9, 23–6, 19–8			Cape Town International Convention Centre Arena 1 Umpires: (New Zealand) Kristie Simpson, (Jamaica) Terrence Peart
29 July; 16:00 (SAST UTC+2)	Report; Stats	Venter 13/15 (87%) van der Berg 50/57 (88%); Taljaard 24/27 (89%)		Algama 24/28 (86%); Wannithilake 1/2 (50%); Alwis 7/8 (88%)	Cape Town International Convention Centre Arena 1 Umpires: (New Zealand) Kristie Simpson, (Jamaica) Terrence Peart

30 July; 9:00 (SAST UTC+2)	Report; Stats	Wales	68–56	Sri Lanka	Cape Town International Convention Centre Arena 2 Umpires: (Jamaica) Terrence Peart, (South Africa) Elizna van den Berg
30 July; 9:00 (SAST UTC+2)	Report; Stats	Scoring by quarter: 17–11, 13–11, 20–18, 18–16			Cape Town International Convention Centre Arena 2 Umpires: (Jamaica) Terrence Peart, (South Africa) Elizna van den Berg
30 July; 9:00 (SAST UTC+2)	Report; Stats	Rowe 49/50 (98%); Matthewman 2/2 (100%); Watkins 7/8 (88%); Yarranton 10/16 (63%)		Sivalingam 33/35 (94%); Alwis 7/7 (100%); Algama 16/21 (76%)	Cape Town International Convention Centre Arena 2 Umpires: (Jamaica) Terrence Peart, (South Africa) Elizna van den Berg

30 July; 18:00 (SAST UTC+2)	Report; Stats	Jamaica	67–49	South Africa	Cape Town International Convention Centre Arena 1 Umpires: (Australia) Jemma Cook, (Australia) Tara Warner
30 July; 18:00 (SAST UTC+2)	Report; Stats	Scoring by quarter: 16–12, 16–14, 20–3, 15–20			Cape Town International Convention Centre Arena 1 Umpires: (Australia) Jemma Cook, (Australia) Tara Warner
30 July; 18:00 (SAST UTC+2)	Report; Stats	Fowler 39/40 (98%); Beckford 19/22 (86%); Robinson 3/4 (75%); Aiken 6/6 (100%)		Potgieter 17/17 (100%) van der Berg 4/8 (50%); Taljaard 15/19 (79%); Venter 13/15 (87%)	Cape Town International Convention Centre Arena 1 Umpires: (Australia) Jemma Cook, (Australia) Tara Warner

=== Group D ===
Pos	Team	Pld	W	D	L	GF	GA	%	Pts	Qualification
1	New Zealand (A)	3	3	0	0	210	90	233.3	6	Advance to Preliminaries Stage Two
2	Uganda (A)	3	2	0	1	197	125	157.6	4	Advance to Preliminaries Stage Two
3	Trinidad and Tobago (A)	3	1	0	2	110	186	59.1	2	Advance to Preliminaries Stage Two
4	Singapore	3	0	0	3	92	208	44.2	0	

Source: Netball Pass
(A) Advance to a further round

28 July; 9:00 (SAST UTC+2)	Report; Stats	New Zealand	76–27	Trinidad and Tobago	Cape Town International Convention Centre Arena 1
28 July; 9:00 (SAST UTC+2)	Report; Stats	Scoring by quarter: 23–2, 20–9, 15–9, 18–7			Cape Town International Convention Centre Arena 1
28 July; 9:00 (SAST UTC+2)	Report; Stats	Nweke 31/31 (100%); Wilson 21/23 (91%); Selby-Rickit 16/20 (80%); Ekenasio 8/9 (89%)		Noel 17/18 (94%); Cooper 10/10 (100%)	Cape Town International Convention Centre Arena 1

28 July; 11:00 (SAST UTC+2)	Report; Stats	Uganda	79–37	Singapore	Cape Town International Convention Centre Arena 2
28 July; 11:00 (SAST UTC+2)	Report; Stats	Scoring by quarter: 22–9, 20–9, 20–11, 17–8			Cape Town International Convention Centre Arena 2
28 July; 11:00 (SAST UTC+2)	Report; Stats	Haniisha 31/35 (89%); Namulumba 15/15 (100%); Cholhok 15/17 (88%); Nassanga 11/12 (92%); Eyaru 7/7 (100%)		Chahal 23/30 (77%); Toh 14/23 (61%)	Cape Town International Convention Centre Arena 2

29 July; 9:00 (SAST UTC+2)	Report; Stats	New Zealand	54–44	Uganda	Cape Town International Convention Centre Arena 1 Umpires: (Australia) Kate Wright, (England) Gary Burgess
29 July; 9:00 (SAST UTC+2)	Report; Stats	Scoring by quarter: 13–11, 12–10, 13–11, 16–12			Cape Town International Convention Centre Arena 1 Umpires: (Australia) Kate Wright, (England) Gary Burgess
29 July; 9:00 (SAST UTC+2)	Report; Stats	Selby-Rickit 17/19 (89%); Wilson 10/11 (91%); Ekenasio 12/12 (100%); Nweke 15/16 (94%)		Cholhok 30/38 (79%); Nassanga 11/13 (85%); Eyaru 3/6 (50%)	Cape Town International Convention Centre Arena 1 Umpires: (Australia) Kate Wright, (England) Gary Burgess

29 July; 18:00 (SAST UTC+2)	Report; Stats	Trinidad and Tobago	49–36	Singapore	Cape Town International Convention Centre Arena 1 Umpires: (Jamaica) Tracy-Ann Griffiths, (South Africa) Anso Kemp
29 July; 18:00 (SAST UTC+2)	Report; Stats	Scoring by quarter: 13–10, 8–9, 13–11, 15–6			Cape Town International Convention Centre Arena 1 Umpires: (Jamaica) Tracy-Ann Griffiths, (South Africa) Anso Kemp
29 July; 18:00 (SAST UTC+2)	Report; Stats	Noel 38/44 (86%); Dillon 8/9 (89%); Cooper 3/4 (75%)		Chahal 23/31 (74%); Toh 13/28 (46%)	Cape Town International Convention Centre Arena 1 Umpires: (Jamaica) Tracy-Ann Griffiths, (South Africa) Anso Kemp

30 July; 11:00 (SAST UTC+2)	Report; Stats	New Zealand	80–19	Singapore	Cape Town International Convention Centre Arena 1 Umpires: (Australia) Bronwen Adams, (South Africa) Anso Kemp
30 July; 11:00 (SAST UTC+2)	Report; Stats	Scoring by quarter: 17–7, 24–2, 20–5, 19–5			Cape Town International Convention Centre Arena 1 Umpires: (Australia) Bronwen Adams, (South Africa) Anso Kemp
30 July; 11:00 (SAST UTC+2)	Report; Stats	Selby-Rickit 49/51 (96%); Wilson 15/19 (79%); Ekenasio 4/6 (67%); Nweke 12/13 (92%)		Chahal 12/21 (57%); Toh 7/18 (39%)	Cape Town International Convention Centre Arena 1 Umpires: (Australia) Bronwen Adams, (South Africa) Anso Kemp

30 July; 16:00 (SAST UTC+2)	Report; Stats	Uganda	74–34	Trinidad and Tobago	Cape Town International Convention Centre Arena 2 Umpires: (England) Gary Burgess, (New Zealand) Angela Armstrong-Lush
30 July; 16:00 (SAST UTC+2)	Report; Stats	Scoring by quarter: 14–11, 19–7, 21–9, 20–7			Cape Town International Convention Centre Arena 2 Umpires: (England) Gary Burgess, (New Zealand) Angela Armstrong-Lush
30 July; 16:00 (SAST UTC+2)	Report; Stats	Namulumba 4/5 (80%); Eyaru 18/19 (95%); Nassanga 17/19 (89%); Cholhok 35/36 (97%)		Cooper 3/3 (100%); Dillon 2/6 (33%); Noel 29/31 (94%)	Cape Town International Convention Centre Arena 2 Umpires: (England) Gary Burgess, (New Zealand) Angela Armstrong-Lush

== Preliminaries Stage Two ==
=== Group E ===
Group E contains the four bottom teams from Groups A-D and compete for final placings 13th to 16th.

Pos	Team	Pld	W	D	L	GF	GA	%	Pts
1	Zimbabwe	3	2	0	1	184	138	133.3	4
2	Barbados	3	2	0	1	173	155	111.6	4
3	Singapore	3	1	0	2	145	175	82.9	2
4	Sri Lanka	3	1	0	2	148	182	81.3	2

Source: Netball Pass

31 July; 9:00 (SAST UTC+2)	Report; Stats	Zimbabwe	45–62	Barbados	Cape Town International Convention Centre Arena 2 Umpires: (New Zealand) Gareth Fowler, (South Africa) Anso Kemp
31 July; 9:00 (SAST UTC+2)	Report; Stats	Scoring by quarter: 9–15, 7–20, 15–15, 14–12			Cape Town International Convention Centre Arena 2 Umpires: (New Zealand) Gareth Fowler, (South Africa) Anso Kemp
31 July; 9:00 (SAST UTC+2)	Report; Stats	Makunde 30/33 (91%); Muzanenamo 9/9 (100%); Bwanali 3/3 (100%); Matura 3/3 (100%)		Walrond 1/1 (100%); Blackman 23/28 (82%); Corbin 38/42 (90%)	Cape Town International Convention Centre Arena 2 Umpires: (New Zealand) Gareth Fowler, (South Africa) Anso Kemp

31 July; 16:00 (SAST UTC+2)	Report; Stats	Sri Lanka	52–55	Singapore	Cape Town International Convention Centre Arena 2 Umpires: (Australia) Bronwen Adams, (South Africa) Elizna van den Berg
31 July; 16:00 (SAST UTC+2)	Report; Stats	Scoring by quarter: 10–19, 17–7, 13–16, 12–13			Cape Town International Convention Centre Arena 2 Umpires: (Australia) Bronwen Adams, (South Africa) Elizna van den Berg
31 July; 16:00 (SAST UTC+2)	Report; Stats	Sivalingam 22/27 (81%); Alwis 2/2 (100%); Algama 28/31 (90%)		Chahal 32/36 (89%); Toh 23/29 (79%)	Cape Town International Convention Centre Arena 2 Umpires: (Australia) Bronwen Adams, (South Africa) Elizna van den Berg

1 August; 9:00 (SAST UTC+2)	Stats	Barbados	55–50	Singapore	Cape Town International Convention Centre Arena 1 Umpires: (South Africa) Elizna van den Berg, (Jamaica) Terrance Peart
1 August; 9:00 (SAST UTC+2)	Stats	Scoring by quarter: 12–13, 17–11, 11–16, 15–10			Cape Town International Convention Centre Arena 1 Umpires: (South Africa) Elizna van den Berg, (Jamaica) Terrance Peart
1 August; 9:00 (SAST UTC+2)	Stats	Corbin 41/43 (95%); Blackman 14/16 (88%)		Chahal 39/46 (85%); Toh 11/16 (69%)	Cape Town International Convention Centre Arena 1 Umpires: (South Africa) Elizna van den Berg, (Jamaica) Terrance Peart

1 August; 18:00 (SAST UTC+2)	Stats	Zimbabwe	71–36	Sri Lanka	Cape Town International Convention Centre Arena 1 Umpires: (Jamaica) Tracy-Ann Griffiths, (Australia) Bronwen Adams
1 August; 18:00 (SAST UTC+2)	Stats	Scoring by quarter: 18–10, 15–12, 19–8, 19–6			Cape Town International Convention Centre Arena 1 Umpires: (Jamaica) Tracy-Ann Griffiths, (Australia) Bronwen Adams
1 August; 18:00 (SAST UTC+2)	Stats	Takaidza 11/18 (61%); Muzanenamo 32/34 (94%); Makunde 28/30 (93%)		Alwis 1/1 (100%); Wannithilake 20/23 (87%); Algama 14/18 (78%); Sivalingam 1/2 (50%)	Cape Town International Convention Centre Arena 1 Umpires: (Jamaica) Tracy-Ann Griffiths, (Australia) Bronwen Adams

2 August; 9:00 (SAST UTC+2)	Stats	Zimbabwe	68–40	Singapore	Cape Town International Convention Centre Arena 1 Umpires: (South Africa) Elizna van den Berg, (Australia) Kate Wright
2 August; 9:00 (SAST UTC+2)	Stats	Scoring by quarter: 19–6, 19–13, 16–15, 14–6			Cape Town International Convention Centre Arena 1 Umpires: (South Africa) Elizna van den Berg, (Australia) Kate Wright
2 August; 9:00 (SAST UTC+2)	Stats	Makunde 47/50 (94%); Muzanenamo 21/22 (95%)		Toh 16/20 (80%); Chahal 24/34 (71%)	Cape Town International Convention Centre Arena 1 Umpires: (South Africa) Elizna van den Berg, (Australia) Kate Wright

2 August; 20:00 (SAST UTC+2)	Stats	Sri Lanka	60–56	Barbados	Cape Town International Convention Centre Arena 1 Umpires: (Jamaica) Terrance Peart, (Jamaica) Tracy-Ann Griffiths
2 August; 20:00 (SAST UTC+2)	Stats	Scoring by quarter: 15–15, 15–11, 13–22, 17–8			Cape Town International Convention Centre Arena 1 Umpires: (Jamaica) Terrance Peart, (Jamaica) Tracy-Ann Griffiths
2 August; 20:00 (SAST UTC+2)	Stats	Algama 47/50 (94%); Wannithilake 4/4 (100%); Alwis 4/4 (100%)		Blackman 29/35 (83%); Corbin 27/31 (87%)	Cape Town International Convention Centre Arena 1 Umpires: (Jamaica) Terrance Peart, (Jamaica) Tracy-Ann Griffiths

=== Group F ===
The top three teams from Groups A and B advance to Group F. All six teams previously played two matches against Group F teams – for example, each team in Group A played the two other Group A teams who advanced to Group F. At the start of Group F the table is initialised to include the results of these two Group A or Group B matches for each team. The former Group A teams play the former Group B teams in three rounds of three matches in Group F.

Teams finishing first and second in Group F go through to the semi-finals – the top team in Group F plays the second team in Group G and the second team in Group F plays the top team in Group G. The four remaining teams in Group F compete for the final placings from 5th to 12th.

Pos	Team	Pld	W	D	L	GF	GA	%	Pts	Qualification
1	England (Q)	5	5	0	0	341	205	166.3	10	Advance to the semi-finals
2	Australia (Q)	5	4	0	1	388	209	185.6	8	Advance to the semi-finals
3	Malawi	5	3	0	2	258	280	92.1	6	
4	Tonga	5	2	0	3	246	311	46.9	4	
5	Scotland	5	1	0	4	232	295	78.6	2	
6	Fiji	5	0	0	5	205	370	55.4	0	

Source: Netball Pass
(Q) Qualified to the phase indicated

31 July; 9:00 (SAST UTC+2)	Report; Stats	Australia	77–37	Scotland	Cape Town International Convention Centre Arena 1 Umpires: (England) Alison Harrison, (Jamaica) Terrance Peart
31 July; 9:00 (SAST UTC+2)	Report; Stats	Scoring by quarter: 21–9, 23–8, 15–11, 18–9			Cape Town International Convention Centre Arena 1 Umpires: (England) Alison Harrison, (Jamaica) Terrance Peart
31 July; 9:00 (SAST UTC+2)	Report; Stats	Koenen 25/26 (96%); Austin 8/10 (80%); Garbin 39/41 (95%); Wood 5/8 (63%)		Barrie 14/18 (78%); Cairns 9/12 (75%); Goodwin 10/14 (71%); McCall 4/9 (44%)	Cape Town International Convention Centre Arena 1 Umpires: (England) Alison Harrison, (Jamaica) Terrance Peart

31 July; 11:00 (SAST UTC+2)	Report; Stats	Fiji	48–62	Malawi	Cape Town International Convention Centre Arena 2 Umpires: (Australia) Jemma Cook, (England) Gary Burgess
31 July; 11:00 (SAST UTC+2)	Report; Stats	Scoring by quarter: 10–20, 13–16, 11–11, 14–15			Cape Town International Convention Centre Arena 2 Umpires: (Australia) Jemma Cook, (England) Gary Burgess
31 July; 11:00 (SAST UTC+2)	Report; Stats	Rusivakula 40/41 (98%); Lutua-Rusivakula 2/2 (100%); Kete 5/6 (83%); Rauluni 1/3 (33%)		Mvula 38/40 (95%); Kumwenda 24/27 (89%)	Cape Town International Convention Centre Arena 2 Umpires: (Australia) Jemma Cook, (England) Gary Burgess

31 July; 18:00 (SAST UTC+2)	Report; Stats	Tonga	46–72	England	Cape Town International Convention Centre Arena 2 Umpires: (New Zealand) Ken Metekingi, (Australia) Kate Wright
31 July; 18:00 (SAST UTC+2)	Report; Stats	Scoring by quarter: 13–19, 9–19, 14–16, 10–18			Cape Town International Convention Centre Arena 2 Umpires: (New Zealand) Ken Metekingi, (Australia) Kate Wright
31 July; 18:00 (SAST UTC+2)	Report; Stats	Palavi 37/42 (88%); Hansen 8/13 (62%); Tuivaiti 1/1 (100%)		Tchine 13/13 (100%); Cardwell 30/34 (88%); Housby 29/33 (88%)	Cape Town International Convention Centre Arena 2 Umpires: (New Zealand) Ken Metekingi, (Australia) Kate Wright

1 August; 11:00 (SAST UTC+2)	Stats	Australia	70–46	Malawi	Cape Town International Convention Centre Arena 1 Umpires: (New Zealand) Kristie Simpson, (New Zealand) Ken Metekingi
1 August; 11:00 (SAST UTC+2)	Stats	Scoring by quarter: 16–13, 12–15, 21–9, 21–9			Cape Town International Convention Centre Arena 1 Umpires: (New Zealand) Kristie Simpson, (New Zealand) Ken Metekingi
1 August; 11:00 (SAST UTC+2)	Stats	Garbin 28/32 (88%); Austin 10/10 (100%); Koenen 14/15 (93%); Wood 18/19 (95%)		Mvula 25/30 (83%); Kumwenda 21/23 (91%)	Cape Town International Convention Centre Arena 1 Umpires: (New Zealand) Kristie Simpson, (New Zealand) Ken Metekingi

1 August; 16:00 (SAST UTC+2)	Report; Stats	Tonga	55–47	Scotland	Cape Town International Convention Centre Arena 1 Umpires: (England) Louise Travis, (Australia) Tara Warner
1 August; 16:00 (SAST UTC+2)	Report; Stats	Scoring by quarter: 15–10, 13–13, 16–12, 11–12			Cape Town International Convention Centre Arena 1 Umpires: (England) Louise Travis, (Australia) Tara Warner
1 August; 16:00 (SAST UTC+2)	Report; Stats	Palavi 41/43 (95%); Hansen 14/17 (82%)		Barrie 21/29 (72%); McCall 21/26 (81%); Goodwin 5/8 (63%)	Cape Town International Convention Centre Arena 1 Umpires: (England) Louise Travis, (Australia) Tara Warner

1 August; 20:00 (SAST UTC+2)	Stats	Fiji	28–89	England	Cape Town International Convention Centre Arena 1 Umpires: (England) Alison Harrison, (South Africa) Anso Kemp
1 August; 20:00 (SAST UTC+2)	Stats	Scoring by quarter: 8–26, 7–24, 8–19, 5–20			Cape Town International Convention Centre Arena 1 Umpires: (England) Alison Harrison, (South Africa) Anso Kemp
1 August; 20:00 (SAST UTC+2)	Stats	Panapasa 2/4 (50%); Rusivakula 25/30 (83%); Kete 1/1 (100%)		Tchine 15/15 (100%); Housby 26/28 (93%); Cardwell 40/41 (98%); Metcalf 8/9 (89%)	Cape Town International Convention Centre Arena 1 Umpires: (England) Alison Harrison, (South Africa) Anso Kemp

3 August; 9:00 (SAST UTC+2)	Stats	Australia	55–56	England	Cape Town International Convention Centre Arena 1 Umpires: (New Zealand) Gareth Fowler, (New Zealand) Angela Armstrong-Lush
3 August; 9:00 (SAST UTC+2)	Stats	Scoring by quarter: 13–15, 19–11, 13–18, 10–12			Cape Town International Convention Centre Arena 1 Umpires: (New Zealand) Gareth Fowler, (New Zealand) Angela Armstrong-Lush
3 August; 9:00 (SAST UTC+2)	Stats	Austin 4/5 (80%); Koenen 32/34 (94%); Wood 19/22 (86%)		Housby 22/22 (100%); Cardwell 34/35 (97%)	Cape Town International Convention Centre Arena 1 Umpires: (New Zealand) Gareth Fowler, (New Zealand) Angela Armstrong-Lush

3 August; 11:00 (SAST UTC+2)	Stats	Fiji	46–62	Scotland	Cape Town International Convention Centre Arena 2 Umpires: (England) Louise Travis, (South Africa) Anso Kemp
3 August; 11:00 (SAST UTC+2)	Stats	Scoring by quarter: 8–13, 18–16, 13–16, 7–17			Cape Town International Convention Centre Arena 2 Umpires: (England) Louise Travis, (South Africa) Anso Kemp
3 August; 11:00 (SAST UTC+2)	Stats	Rusivakula 28/29 (97%); Rauluni 17/22 (77%); Lutua-Rusivakula 1/1 (100%)		McCall 27/30 (90%); Goodwin 21/22 (95%); Barrie 11/13 (85%); Cairns 3/3 (100%)	Cape Town International Convention Centre Arena 2 Umpires: (England) Louise Travis, (South Africa) Anso Kemp

3 August; 18:00 (SAST UTC+2)	Stats	Tonga	51–56	Malawi	Cape Town International Convention Centre Arena 1 Umpires: (Australia) Jemma Cook, (England) Kate Mann
3 August; 18:00 (SAST UTC+2)	Stats	Scoring by quarter: 13–13, 13–18, 14–15, 11–10			Cape Town International Convention Centre Arena 1 Umpires: (Australia) Jemma Cook, (England) Kate Mann
3 August; 18:00 (SAST UTC+2)	Stats	Palavi 25/30 (83%); Tuivaiti 20/20 (100%); Hansen 6/8 (75%)		Mvula 38/41 (93%); Kumwenda 18/18 (100%); Chimaliro 0/1 (0%)	Cape Town International Convention Centre Arena 1 Umpires: (Australia) Jemma Cook, (England) Kate Mann

=== Group G ===
The top three teams from Groups C and D advance to Group G. All six teams previously played two matches against Group G teams – for example, each team in Group C played the two other Group C teams who advanced to Group G. At the start of Group G the table is initialised to include the results of these two Group C or Group D matches for each team. The former Group C teams play the former Group D teams in three rounds of three matches in Group G.

Teams finishing first and second in Group G go through to the semi-finals – the top team in Group G plays the second team in Group F and the second team in Group G plays the top team in Group F. The four remaining teams in Group G compete for the final placings from 5th to 12th.

Pos	Team	Pld	W	D	L	GF	GA	%	Pts	Qualification
1	Jamaica (Q)	5	5	0	0	351	212	165.6	10	Advance to the semi-finals
2	New Zealand (Q)	5	3	1	1	309	212	145.8	7	Advance to the semi-finals
3	South Africa	5	3	1	1	279	243	114.8	7	
4	Uganda	5	2	0	3	290	257	112.8	4	
5	Wales	5	1	0	4	250	347	72	2	
6	Trinidad and Tobago	5	0	0	5	170	378	45	0	

Source: Netball Pass
(Q) Qualified to the phase indicated

31 July; 11:00 (SAST UTC+2)	Report; Stats	Wales	34–83	New Zealand	Cape Town International Convention Centre Arena 1 Umpires: (Jamaica) Tracy-Ann Griffiths, (England) Louise Travis
31 July; 11:00 (SAST UTC+2)	Report; Stats	Scoring by quarter: 8–19, 8–21, 6–25, 12–18			Cape Town International Convention Centre Arena 1 Umpires: (Jamaica) Tracy-Ann Griffiths, (England) Louise Travis
31 July; 11:00 (SAST UTC+2)	Report; Stats	Rowe 18/21 (86%); Yarranton 4/7 (57%); Kuti 3/3 (100%); Matthewman 4/6 (67%); Watkins 5/6 (83%)		Selby-Rickit 15/17 (88%); Metuarau 4/5 (80%); Ekenasio 15/16 (94%); Wilson 49/49 (100%)	Cape Town International Convention Centre Arena 1 Umpires: (Jamaica) Tracy-Ann Griffiths, (England) Louise Travis

31 July; 16:00 (SAST UTC+2)	Report; Stats	Jamaica	61–49	Uganda	Cape Town International Convention Centre Arena 1 Umpires: (Australia) Joshua Bowring, (New Zealand) Angela Armstrong-Lush
31 July; 16:00 (SAST UTC+2)	Report; Stats	Scoring by quarter: 15–12, 23–9, 11–16, 12–12			Cape Town International Convention Centre Arena 1 Umpires: (Australia) Joshua Bowring, (New Zealand) Angela Armstrong-Lush
31 July; 16:00 (SAST UTC+2)	Report; Stats	Aiken 15/15 (100%); Robinson 8/9 (89%); Beckford 10/10 (100%); Fowler 28/28 (100%)		Cholhok 28/33 (85%); Nassanga 15/18 (83%); Eyaru 6/6 (100%)	Cape Town International Convention Centre Arena 1 Umpires: (Australia) Joshua Bowring, (New Zealand) Angela Armstrong-Lush

31 July; 18:00 (SAST UTC+2)	Report; Stats	South Africa	69–28	Trinidad and Tobago	Cape Town International Convention Centre Arena 1 Umpires: (New Zealand) Kristie Simpson, (England) Kate Mann
31 July; 18:00 (SAST UTC+2)	Report; Stats	Scoring by quarter: 18–12, 15–3, 18–6, 18–7			Cape Town International Convention Centre Arena 1 Umpires: (New Zealand) Kristie Simpson, (England) Kate Mann
31 July; 18:00 (SAST UTC+2)	Report; Stats	van der Berg 22/24 (92%); Ngubane 1/1 (100%); Taljaard 24/30 (80%); Venter 22/29 (76%)		McCarthy 1/1 (100%); Cooper 10/11 (91%); Dillon 6/6 (100%); Noel 11/13 (85%)	Cape Town International Convention Centre Arena 1 Umpires: (New Zealand) Kristie Simpson, (England) Kate Mann

2 August; 11:00 (SAST UTC+2)	Stats	Wales	56–73	Uganda	Cape Town International Convention Centre Arena 1 Umpires: (New Zealand) , Angela Armstrong-Lush, TBC
2 August; 11:00 (SAST UTC+2)	Stats	Scoring by quarter: 12–15, 15–21, 14–22, 15–15			Cape Town International Convention Centre Arena 1 Umpires: (New Zealand) , Angela Armstrong-Lush, TBC
2 August; 11:00 (SAST UTC+2)	Stats	Rowe 53/54 (98%); Yarranton 3/8 (38%)		Muhameed 11/13 (85%); Nassanga 10/10 (100%); Cholhok 42/44 (95%); Eyaru 10/10 (100%)	Cape Town International Convention Centre Arena 1 Umpires: (New Zealand) , Angela Armstrong-Lush, TBC

2 August; 16:00 (SAST UTC+2)	Stats	Jamaica	89–26	Trinidad and Tobago	Cape Town International Convention Centre Arena 1 Umpires: (New Zealand) Gareth Fowler, (Australia) Jemma Cook
2 August; 16:00 (SAST UTC+2)	Stats	Scoring by quarter: 20–6, 24–4, 25–9, 20–7			Cape Town International Convention Centre Arena 1 Umpires: (New Zealand) Gareth Fowler, (Australia) Jemma Cook
2 August; 16:00 (SAST UTC+2)	Stats	Aiken 38/43 (88%); Robinson 15/17 (88%); Beckford 20/24 (83%); Fowler 16/18 (89%)		Noel 20/22 (91%); Cooper 6/8 (75%)	Cape Town International Convention Centre Arena 1 Umpires: (New Zealand) Gareth Fowler, (Australia) Jemma Cook

2 August; 18:00 (SAST UTC+2)	Report; Stats	South Africa	48–48	New Zealand	Cape Town International Convention Centre Arena 1 Umpires: (England) Gary Burgess, (Australia) Josh Bowring
2 August; 18:00 (SAST UTC+2)	Report; Stats	Scoring by quarter: 10–11, 11–15, 13–12, 14–10			Cape Town International Convention Centre Arena 1 Umpires: (England) Gary Burgess, (Australia) Josh Bowring
2 August; 18:00 (SAST UTC+2)	Report; Stats	van der Berg 22/26 (85%); Taljaard 15/18 (83%); Venter 11/17 (65%)		Wilson 37/41 (90%); Metuarau 1/1 (100%); Ekenasio 10/11 (91%)	Cape Town International Convention Centre Arena 1 Umpires: (England) Gary Burgess, (Australia) Josh Bowring

3 August; 9:00 (SAST UTC+2)	Stats	Wales	70–55	Trinidad and Tobago	Cape Town International Convention Centre Arena 2 Umpires: (New Zealand) Kristie Simpson, (New Zealand) Ken Metekingi
3 August; 9:00 (SAST UTC+2)	Stats	Scoring by quarter: 18–14, 14–14, 21–11, 17–16			Cape Town International Convention Centre Arena 2 Umpires: (New Zealand) Kristie Simpson, (New Zealand) Ken Metekingi
3 August; 9:00 (SAST UTC+2)	Stats	Rowe 47/48 (98%); Yarranton 17/21 (81%); Kuti 4/4 (100%); Matthewman 2/2 (100%)		Noel 44/49 (90%); Cooper 11/12 (92%)	Cape Town International Convention Centre Arena 2 Umpires: (New Zealand) Kristie Simpson, (New Zealand) Ken Metekingi

3 August; 11:00 (SAST UTC+2)	Stats	Jamaica	59–48	New Zealand	Cape Town International Convention Centre Arena 1 Umpires: (England) Gary Burgess, (Australia) Tara Warner
3 August; 11:00 (SAST UTC+2)	Stats	Scoring by quarter: 15–11, 11–12, 15–16, 18–9			Cape Town International Convention Centre Arena 1 Umpires: (England) Gary Burgess, (Australia) Tara Warner
3 August; 11:00 (SAST UTC+2)	Stats	Fowler 49/49 (100%); Beckford 9/10 (90%); Aiken 1/3 (33%)		Wilson 31/33 (94%); Ekenasio 17/18 (94%)	Cape Town International Convention Centre Arena 1 Umpires: (England) Gary Burgess, (Australia) Tara Warner

3 August; 16:00 (SAST UTC+2)	Stats	South Africa	52–50	Uganda	Cape Town International Convention Centre Arena 1 Umpires: (Australia) Josh Bowring, (Australia) Kate Wright
3 August; 16:00 (SAST UTC+2)	Stats	Scoring by quarter: 16–11, 17–8, 8–17, 11–14			Cape Town International Convention Centre Arena 1 Umpires: (Australia) Josh Bowring, (Australia) Kate Wright
3 August; 16:00 (SAST UTC+2)	Stats	Venter 26/28 (93%); Taljaard 15/15 (100%) van der Berg 11/13 (85%)		Cholhok 29/29 (100%); Nassanga 21/23 (91%); Eyaru 0/1 (0%)	Cape Town International Convention Centre Arena 1 Umpires: (Australia) Josh Bowring, (Australia) Kate Wright

== Placement matches ==
=== 15th place ===
4 August; 9:00 (SAST UTC+2)	Report; Stats	Singapore	49–46	Sri Lanka	Cape Town International Convention Centre Arena 1 Umpires: (Jamaica) Terrance Peart, (South Africa) Elizna van den Berg
4 August; 9:00 (SAST UTC+2)	Report; Stats	Scoring by quarter: 8–15, 12–11, 16–13, 13–10			Cape Town International Convention Centre Arena 1 Umpires: (Jamaica) Terrance Peart, (South Africa) Elizna van den Berg
4 August; 9:00 (SAST UTC+2)	Report; Stats	Chahal 38/43 (88%); Toh 11/14 (79%)		Algama 43/46 (93%); Alwis 2/2 (100%); Wannithilake 1/1 (100%); Perera 0/2 (0%)	Cape Town International Convention Centre Arena 1 Umpires: (Jamaica) Terrance Peart, (South Africa) Elizna van den Berg

=== 13th place ===
4 August; 11:00 (SAST UTC+2)	Report; Stats	Zimbabwe	75–48	Barbados	Cape Town International Convention Centre Arena 1 Umpires: (South Africa) Anso Kemp, (England) Alison Harrison
4 August; 11:00 (SAST UTC+2)	Report; Stats	Scoring by quarter: 15–14, 15–14, 22–7, 23–13			Cape Town International Convention Centre Arena 1 Umpires: (South Africa) Anso Kemp, (England) Alison Harrison
4 August; 11:00 (SAST UTC+2)	Report; Stats	Makunde 57/59 (97%); Muzanenamo 18/20 (90%)		Corbin 29/32 (91%); Blackman 17/19 (89%); Walrond 2/5 (40%)	Cape Town International Convention Centre Arena 1 Umpires: (South Africa) Anso Kemp, (England) Alison Harrison

=== 11th place ===
5 August; 9:00 (SAST UTC+2)	Stats	Fiji	71–37	Trinidad and Tobago	Cape Town International Convention Centre Arena 1 Umpires: (Jamaica) Tracy-Ann Griffiths, (New Zealand) Kristie Simpson
5 August; 9:00 (SAST UTC+2)	Stats	Scoring by quarter: 17–8, 17–7, 15–13, 22–9			Cape Town International Convention Centre Arena 1 Umpires: (Jamaica) Tracy-Ann Griffiths, (New Zealand) Kristie Simpson
5 August; 9:00 (SAST UTC+2)	Stats	Rauluni 36/71 (51%); Rusivakula 18/22 (82%); Panapasa 13/13 (100%); Lutua-Rusivakula 4/4 (100%)		Noel 23/27 (85%); Cooper 13/13 (100%); Morgan 1/2 (50%); Dillon 0/1 (0%)	Cape Town International Convention Centre Arena 1 Umpires: (Jamaica) Tracy-Ann Griffiths, (New Zealand) Kristie Simpson

=== 9th place ===
5 August; 18:00 (SAST UTC+2)	Stats	Scotland	42–57	Wales	Cape Town International Convention Centre Arena 1 Umpires: (England) Louise Travis, (Australia) Bronwen Adams
5 August; 18:00 (SAST UTC+2)	Stats	Scoring by quarter: 10–12, 11–13, 11–17, 10–15			Cape Town International Convention Centre Arena 1 Umpires: (England) Louise Travis, (Australia) Bronwen Adams
5 August; 18:00 (SAST UTC+2)	Stats	McCall 19/26 (73%); Goodwin 11/18 (61%); Cairns 6/7 (86%); Barrie 6/10 (60%)		Rowe 42/45 (93%); Yarranton 15/17 (88%)	Cape Town International Convention Centre Arena 1 Umpires: (England) Louise Travis, (Australia) Bronwen Adams

=== 5th–8th ===
5–8 placing matches
4 August
Malawi	46
Uganda	57
4 August
South Africa	72
Tonga	46

5–6 match
6 August
Uganda	49
South Africa	47
7–8 match
6 August
Malawi	64
Tonga	54

==== 5th–8th play-offs ====
4 August; 16:00 (SAST UTC+2)	Report; Stats	Malawi	46–57	Uganda	Cape Town International Convention Centre Arena 1 Umpires: (New Zealand) Angela Armstrong-Lush, (Australia) Jemma Cook
4 August; 16:00 (SAST UTC+2)	Report; Stats	Scoring by quarter: 14–14, 9–14, 12–15, 11–14			Cape Town International Convention Centre Arena 1 Umpires: (New Zealand) Angela Armstrong-Lush, (Australia) Jemma Cook
4 August; 16:00 (SAST UTC+2)	Report; Stats	Mvula 27/28 (96%); Kumwenda 19/23 (83%)		Nassanga 38/39 (97%); Cholhok 19/21 (90%)	Cape Town International Convention Centre Arena 1 Umpires: (New Zealand) Angela Armstrong-Lush, (Australia) Jemma Cook

4 August; 18:00 (SAST UTC+2)	Report; Stats	South Africa	72–46	Tonga	Cape Town International Convention Centre Arena 1 Umpires: (England) Kate Mann, (New Zealand) Ken Metekingi
4 August; 18:00 (SAST UTC+2)	Report; Stats	Scoring by quarter: 12–12, 18–11, 17–13, 25–10			Cape Town International Convention Centre Arena 1 Umpires: (England) Kate Mann, (New Zealand) Ken Metekingi
4 August; 18:00 (SAST UTC+2)	Report; Stats	van der Berg 51/54 (94%); Taljaard 16/20 (80%); Venter 5/9 (56%); Ngubane 0/1 (0%)		Tuivaiti 19/19 (100%); Hansen 13/14 (93%); U. Palavi 10/12 (83%); B. Palavi 4/4 (100%)	Cape Town International Convention Centre Arena 1 Umpires: (England) Kate Mann, (New Zealand) Ken Metekingi

==== 7th place ====
6 August; 9:00 (SAST UTC+2)	Report; Stats	Malawi	64–54	Tonga	Cape Town International Convention Centre Arena 1 Umpires: (Australia) Kristie Simpson, (Australia) Kate Wright
6 August; 9:00 (SAST UTC+2)	Report; Stats	Scoring by quarter: 17–16, 16–13, 12–15, 19–10			Cape Town International Convention Centre Arena 1 Umpires: (Australia) Kristie Simpson, (Australia) Kate Wright
6 August; 9:00 (SAST UTC+2)	Report; Stats	Mvula 39/40 (98%); Kumwenda 25/27 (93%)		U. Palavi 20/22 (91%); Hansen 18/24 (75%); Tuivaiti 14/15 (93%); B. Palavi 2/3 (67%)	Cape Town International Convention Centre Arena 1 Umpires: (Australia) Kristie Simpson, (Australia) Kate Wright

==== 5th place ====
6 August; 11:00 (SAST UTC+2)	Report; Stats	Uganda	49–47	South Africa	Cape Town International Convention Centre Arena 1 Umpires: (England) Gary Burgess, (Australia) Jemma Cook
6 August; 11:00 (SAST UTC+2)	Report; Stats	Scoring by quarter: 12–11, 11–12', 16–14, 10–10			Cape Town International Convention Centre Arena 1 Umpires: (England) Gary Burgess, (Australia) Jemma Cook
6 August; 11:00 (SAST UTC+2)	Report; Stats	Cholhok 29/32 (91%); Eyaru 10/10 (100%); Nassanga 10/14 (71%)		van der Berg 36/43 (84%); Taljaard 11/13 (85%)	Cape Town International Convention Centre Arena 1 Umpires: (England) Gary Burgess, (Australia) Jemma Cook

== Semi-finals and medal matches ==
England finished top of Group F after the preliminary stages, defeating Australia 56–55 in their match, the first time that England had ever defeated Australia in the tournament. The Roses overcoming an eight-goal deficit in the third quarter to take a one-goal win 56–55. Both teams had already qualified for the semi-final stage of the tournament.

In Group G, Jamaica pulled away from New Zealand to win 59–48, with both teams progressing through to semi-finals despite the loss for New Zealand.

As group winners, England faced five-time champions New Zealand, with Jamaica playing 11-time champions Australia.

Defending champions New Zealand, looking to become the first Silver Ferns team to win consecutive tournaments, kept their semi final match against England tight in the first three quarters. The teams were tied at 32–all at three-quarter-time, but a dominant final quarter from England saw them take a 46–40 victory to progress to the final for the first time.

In the other semi final, Australia outlasted Jamaica in a see-sawing match. A dominant display from Diamonds vice-captain Steph Wood in the goal circle (scoring 29 goals from 32 attempts) helping Australia reach their ninth-straight final appearance. Australia's goal keeper Courtney Bruce earning player of the match honours for her ability to disrupt the efforts of the Sunshine Girls attacking duo of Jhaniele Fowler and Shanice Beckford.

In the bronze medal match, Jamaica took a three-goal lead into half time against New Zealand. Plagued by turnovers, Silver Ferns coach Noeline Taurua changed New Zealand's starting shooting circle combination of Maia Wilson and Ameliaranne Ekenasio for Te Paea Selby-Rickit and Tiana Metuarau after half time, but with Jamaica extending that lead in the third quarter to as much as eight goals, Wilson and Ekenasio returned again. Sunshine Girls shooter Jhaniele Fowler scored 43 goals from 44 attempts, while Jodi-Ann Ward was announced as the player of the match as Jamaica secured the bronze medal.

For New Zealand, it was the first time that they had finished the tournament without a medal placing finish.

Australia would enter the final as slight underdogs, after losing to England in the group phase. The Roses led by shooters Eleanor Cardwell and player of the tournament Helen Housby, would be met by ruthless defence in the gold medal match, with the Diamonds defenders pressuring their opponents into errors. Kiera Austin won the player of the final award, after entering the match in the second quarter. Austin and fellow shooter Sophie Garbin sparking a surge from Australia through the second and third quarters, with the Roses unable to go with the Diamonds.

Australia won the final 61–45 to claim their 12th Netball World Cup title, with the Diamonds adding to their 2022 Commonwealth Games gold medal victory.

Semifinals
5 August
England	46
New Zealand	40
5 August
Jamaica	54
Australia	57

Final
6 August
England	45
Australia	61
Bronze Medal Match
6 August
New Zealand	45
Jamaica	52

=== Semi-finals ===
5 August; 11:00 (SAST UTC+2)	Report; Stats	England	46–40	New Zealand	Cape Town International Convention Centre Arena 1 Umpires: (Australia) Tara Warner, (Australia) Joshua Bowring
5 August; 11:00 (SAST UTC+2)	Report; Stats	Scoring by quarter: 9–9, 11–11, 12–12, 14–8			Cape Town International Convention Centre Arena 1 Umpires: (Australia) Tara Warner, (Australia) Joshua Bowring
5 August; 11:00 (SAST UTC+2)	Report; Stats	Cardwell 25/31 (81%); Housby 21/23 (91%)		Wilson 25/25 (100%); Ekenasio 15/16 (94%)	Cape Town International Convention Centre Arena 1 Umpires: (Australia) Tara Warner, (Australia) Joshua Bowring

5 August; 16:00 (SAST UTC+2)	Report; Stats	Jamaica	54–57	Australia	Cape Town International Convention Centre Arena 1 Umpires: (New Zealand) Gareth Fowler, (England) Gary Burgess; Reserve umpire: (England) Kate Mann
5 August; 16:00 (SAST UTC+2)	Report; Stats	Scoring by quarter: 14–14, 15–15, 11–13, 14–15			Cape Town International Convention Centre Arena 1 Umpires: (New Zealand) Gareth Fowler, (England) Gary Burgess; Reserve umpire: (England) Kate Mann
5 August; 16:00 (SAST UTC+2)	Report; Stats	Fowler 46/47 (98%); Beckford 8/10 (80%)		Koenen 28/30 (93%); Wood 29/32 (91%)	Cape Town International Convention Centre Arena 1 Umpires: (New Zealand) Gareth Fowler, (England) Gary Burgess; Reserve umpire: (England) Kate Mann

=== Bronze medal match ===
6 August; 16:00 (SAST UTC+2)	Report; Stats	New Zealand	45–52	Jamaica	Cape Town International Convention Centre Arena 1 Umpires: (Australia) Tara Warner, (Australia) Joshua Bowring; Reserve umpire: (England) Gary Burgess
6 August; 16:00 (SAST UTC+2)	Report; Stats	Scoring by quarter: 11–14, 10–10, 11–14, 13–14			Cape Town International Convention Centre Arena 1 Umpires: (Australia) Tara Warner, (Australia) Joshua Bowring; Reserve umpire: (England) Gary Burgess
6 August; 16:00 (SAST UTC+2)	Report; Stats	Wilson 19/21 (90%); Ekenasio 15/17 (88%); Metuarau 1/1 (100%); Selby-Rickit 10/12 (83%)		Fowler 43/44 (98%); Beckford 9/11 (82%)	Cape Town International Convention Centre Arena 1 Umpires: (Australia) Tara Warner, (Australia) Joshua Bowring; Reserve umpire: (England) Gary Burgess

=== Gold and silver medals match ===
6 August; 18:00 (SAST UTC+2)	Report; Stats	England	45–61	Australia	Cape Town International Convention Centre Arena 1 Umpires: (New Zealand) Gareth Fowler, (New Zealand) Angela Amstrong-Lush; Reserve umpire: (New Zealand) Kristie Simpson
6 August; 18:00 (SAST UTC+2)	Report; Stats	Scoring by quarter: 13–13, 10–14, 13–19, 9–15			Cape Town International Convention Centre Arena 1 Umpires: (New Zealand) Gareth Fowler, (New Zealand) Angela Amstrong-Lush; Reserve umpire: (New Zealand) Kristie Simpson
6 August; 18:00 (SAST UTC+2)	Report; Stats	Cardwell 26/31 (84%); Housby 19/21 (90%)		Garbin 27/33 (82%); Austin 15/17 (88%); Koenen 10/10 (100%); Wood 9/10 (90%)	Cape Town International Convention Centre Arena 1 Umpires: (New Zealand) Gareth Fowler, (New Zealand) Angela Amstrong-Lush; Reserve umpire: (New Zealand) Kristie Simpson

== Tournament top scorers ==
Player	Team	Goals	Att.	%
Jhaniele Fowler	Jamaica	302	310	97.4%
Joyce Mvula	Malawi	260	277	93.9%
Georgia Rowe	Wales	250	264	94.7%
Uneeq Palavi	Tonga	241	267	90.3%
Eleanor Cardwell	England	231	256	90.2%
Nalani Makunde	Zimbabwe	218	232	94.0%
Sophie Garbin	Australia	215	239	90.0%
Maia Wilson	New Zealand	208	241	86.3%
Elmeré van der Berg	South Africa	206	241	85.5%
Kadeen Corbin	Barbados	204	225	90.7%

== Final standings ==
Placement	Team
1st	Australia
2nd	England
3rd	Jamaica
4th	New Zealand
5th	Uganda
6th	South Africa
7th	Malawi
8th	Tonga
9th	Wales
10th	Scotland
11th	Fiji
12th	Trinidad and Tobago
13th	Zimbabwe
14th	Barbados
15th	Singapore
16th	Sri Lanka

== Awards ==
- Player of the Tournament: Helen Housby (England)
- Best attack player: Helen Housby (England)
- Best mid-court player: Kate Heffernan (New Zealand)
- Best defence player: Courtney Bruce (Australia)

=== Medallists ===
Gold	Silver	Bronze
Australia; Coach: Stacey Marinkovich	England; Coach: Jess Thirlby	Jamaica; Coach: Connie Francis
Liz Watson (c); Sunday Aryang; Kiera Austin; Ash Brazill; Courtney Bruce; Sophie Garbin; Paige Hadley; Sarah Klau; Cara Koenen; Jamie-Lee Price; Jo Weston; Stephanie Wood	Natalie Metcalf (co-c); Layla Guscoth (co-c); Imogen Allison; Eleanor Cardwell; Jade Clarke; Funmi Fadoju; Helen Housby; Laura Malcolm; Geva Mentor; Chelsea Pitman; Olivia Tchine; Fran Williams	Romelda Aiken-George; Shanice Beckford; Kadie-Ann Dehaney; Nicole Dixon-Rochester; Jhaniele Fowler; Crystal Plummer; Rebekah Robinson; Shamera Sterling; Adean Thomas; Jodi-Ann Ward; Khadijah Williams; Latanya Wilson
