= Asaeli =

Male given name

- Gender: Male
- Language: Fijian

Origin
- Region of origin: Fiji

Asaeli is a Fijian masculine given name. People bearing the name Asaeli include:

- Asaeli Boko (born 1981), Fijian rugby union player
- Asaeli Driu (born 1930), Fijian cricketer
- Asaeli Masilaca, Fijian politician
- Asaeli Tikoirotuma (born 1986), Fijian rugby union player
- Asaeli Tuivuaka (born 1995), Fijian rugby union player
- Asaeli Ai Valu (born 1989), Tongan-born Japanese rugby union player
