= Rauluni =

Rauluni is a surname. Notable people with the surname include:

- Jacob Rauluni (born 1972), Fijian rugby union player
- Mosese Rauluni (born 1975), Fijian rugby union player, brother of Jacob
- Unaisi Rauluni (born 1994), Fijian netball player
