= Duncan Bell (rugby union) =

England international rugby union player

- Born: Duncan Stuart Crampton Bell; 1 October 1974 (age 52) King's Lynn, Norfolk, England
- Height: 1.88 m (6 ft 2 in)
- Weight: 125 kg (19 st 10 lb)
- School: Colston's Collegiate School

Rugby union career
- Position: Prop
Youth career
- -: Bath
- 1994: NEC Harlequins
Senior career
Years	Team	Apps	(Points)
1996	Ebbw Vale		
1997-1999	Sale Sharks	109	(20)
2001-2003	Pontypridd	65	(65)
2003-2012	Bath	207	(35)
2014	NG Dragons	9	(0)
2014-2015	Lydney	4	(5)
- Correct as of 5 July 2014
International career
Years	Team	Apps	(Points)
2005	England A		(0)
2005-2009	England	5	
- Correct as of 5 July 2014

Duncan Stuart Crampton Bell (born 1 October 1974 in King's Lynn, Norfolk) is an English rugby union player who retired from professional rugby in 2014. Following this he spent some time as player-coach for Lydney Rugby Football Club. Educated at Colston's Collegiate School, Bristol, he is an England international with five caps and currently divides his time between working with the RFU and as a mortgage broker for Chartwell Funding.

Born in Norfolk, Bell was raised in the South Gloucestershire village of Hawkesbury Upton. He attended Colston's Collegiate School with Chris Taylor the Gloucestershire cricketer with whom he shares a great friendship. Bell first played rugby for Bath Minis and later for Bristol U17's and colts whilst attending Colston's Collegiate school.

== Club career ==
Bell had joined NEC Harlequins, but was unable to win a professional contract. Bell then spent a season with Ebbw Vale, prior to a four-year spell with Sale.

He made the move to Pontypridd in 2001. During his time at the club, Bell won the 2002 Principality Cup and was a finalist in the 2002 Parker Pen Shield.

In 2003, Bell moved to Bath. Bell played in the final of the 2007–08 European Challenge Cup, as Bath defeated the Worcester Warriors.

In 2012, Bell announced his retirement from rugby at the end of the 2011–12 season, and announced he was battling depression throughout his career.

In February 2014 Bell came out of retirement to represent Newport Gwent Dragons. making nine appearances that season. For the 2014/2015 season he is playing for Lydney.

== International career ==
Bell was first called up to the England squad in 1998 on the so-called "Tour of Hell". Bell was named on the bench to face Australia, but did not take the field.

Bell was selected for England A in a fixture against France A in 2004, which he snubbed in favour of representing Wales in the future. Due to regulations, Bell was not allowed to join the Welsh summer tour of Argentina, later that year the IRB confirmed he could not represent Wales.

In 2005, Bell played for England A against France A. He was subsequently called up for the senior squad to compete in the 2005 Six Nations, making his England debut against Italy. Bell played in the following fixture against Scotland. Bell was also a member of the 2006 summer tour of Australia.

Due to injuries, Bell was selected for the 2009 Autumn Internationals. Bell featured in all three games, against Australia, Argentina and New Zealand.
