= Waisale Vatuvoka =

Fijian rugby union footballer (born 1983)

- Born: Waisale Vatuvoka; November 10, 1983 (age 43) Suva, Fiji
- Height: 1.76 m (5 ft 9 in)
- Weight: 84 kg (13 st 3 lb)
- School: Queen Victoria School
- University: University of the South Pacific

Rugby union career
- Position: Halfback
- Current team: Naitasiri Highlanders
Senior career
Years	Team	Apps	(Points)
- Highlanders (Colonial Cup)
- Correct as of 31 May 2010

Waisale Vatuvoka (born 10 November 1983 in Suva, Fiji) is a Fijian rugby union footballer. He plays in the halfback position for his club, Highlanders and is also a member of the 2010 Fiji Warriors.

== See also ==
- Fiji national rugby union team
- Fiji Warriors
- 2009 end of year rugby tests
