= Horacio San Martín =

Argentine rugby union player (born 1982)

- Born: Horacio San Martín; February 15, 1982 (age 44) Formosa, Argentina
- Height: 1.88 m (6 ft 2 in)
- Weight: 93 kg (205 lb; 14 st 9 lb)

Rugby union career
- Position: Centre
Amateur team(s)
Years	Team	Apps	(Points)
2007	Tala R.C		
Senior career
Years	Team	Apps	(Points)
2007−2009	Amatori Catania	15	(5)
2010	Pampas XV	6	(0)
2010−2011	Aironi	5	(0)
2011-2012	CA Périgueux	21	(0)
2012-2018	USO Nevers	95	(70)
International career
Years	Team	Apps	(Points)
2009	Argentina	2	(0)
National sevens team
Years	Team		Comps
2005−2009	Argentina 7s		

Horacio San Martín (born February 15, 1982, in Formosa) is an Argentine rugby union footballer. He plays in the centre position. His test debut was against Wales at the Millennium Stadium in November 2009. In May 2010 San Martín was selected in a squad of over 40 players to represent Argentina in the two test Summer tour of Argentina.

== See also ==
- 2009 End of year tours
- Argentina Rugby Union
