= 2023 Netball World Cup qualification – Oceania =

Tournament details
- Host country: Fiji
- City: Suva
- Dates: 19–23 July 2022
- Teams: 5

Final positions
- Champions: Tonga
- Runners-up: Fiji
- Third place: Samoa

Tournament statistics
- Matches played: 10

The Oceania Netball World Cup Qualifiers was held on July 19–23, 2022. The event was hosted by Fiji and took place in Suva where the hosts welcomed Tonga, Samoa, Papua New Guinea, and the Cook Islands.

Competitions were held in a round robin format, with each match needed a winner. The winner awarded two points. At the end of the tournament, the top two teams were invited by 2023 Netball World Cup in Cape Town, South Africa.

== Final standings ==
	MP	MW	ML	MC	PW	PL	PD
Tonga	4	4	0	8	286	153	+133
Fiji	4	3	1	6	199	168	+31
Samoa	4	2	2	4	234	181	+53
Cook Islands	4	1	3	2	179	222	-43
Papua New Guinea	4	0	4	0	140	314	-174

Qualified for 2023 Netball World Cup

== Matches ==
19 July 2022	Fiji	74 – 32	Papua New Guinea

19 July 2022	Samoa	52 – 69	Tonga

20 July 2022	Cook Islands	66 – 48	Papua New Guinea

20 July 2022	Fiji	29 – 59	Tonga

21 July 2022	Cook Islands	35 – 54	Samoa

21 July 2022	Papua New Guinea	28 – 89	Tonga

22 July 2022	Cook Islands	44 – 69	Tonga

22 July 2022	Fiji	45 – 43	Samoa

23 July 2022	Samoa	85 – 32	Papua New Guinea

23 July 2022	Cook Islands	34 – 51	Fiji
