= Joice Takaidza =

Zimbabwean netball player (born 1983)

Personal information
- Born: 10 December 1983 (age 41)
- Height: 1.92 m (6 ft 3 1/2 in)
- Occupation: netball player

Netball career
- Playing position(s): goal attack, goal shooter

Joice Takaidza also spelled as Joyce Takaidza (born 10 December 1983) is a Zimbabwean netball player who represents Zimbabwe internationally and plays in the positions of goal attack and goal defense. She was a member of the Zimbabwean squad which finished at eighth position during the 2019 Netball World Cup, which was historically Zimbabwe's first ever appearance at a Netball World Cup tournament. During the tournament, she was the leading point scorer for Zimbabwe finishing with 198 points in 7 matches.
