= Lydia Panapasa =

Fijian netball player (born 2000)

Personal information
- Born: 14 September 2000 (age 25)
- Occupation: netball player

Netball career
- Playing position: goal shooter

Lydia Panapasa (born 14 September 2000) is a Fijian netball player and former national shot putter who plays for Fiji in the position of goal shooter. She was included in the Fijian squad for the 2019 Netball World Cup which was also her maiden appearance at a Netball World Cup.

== Career ==
Lydia initially pursued her career in athletics similar to her mother and notably claimed a gold medal at the 2017 Coca-Cola Games in shot put event.

She then switched to netball and emerged from youth level after representing the national U21 netball team at the 2017 Netball World Youth Cup which was held in Botswana.

In November 2022 she was selected for the team for the 2022 Netball Singapore Nations Cup.

== Personal life ==
She was born in a family with a rich sporting background. Her mother Salote Noulivou Panapasa was a track and field athlete as well as a national basketball player. Her uncle Ilisoni Taoba was a rugby union player. Her cousin Akapusi Qera was also a rugby union player who formerly captained the national side. Her aunt Laijipa Naulivou was a former national field hockey player.
