= Ras Dumisani =

- Genres: Reggae
- Occupation: Musician
- Instrument: Vocals

Ras Dumisani is a South African reggae musician originally from Durban who has been living and performing in France since 1992. He has released several albums since his debut, Mister Music, in 1998.

== Career ==
He became a household name in South Africa with a controversial, off-key (as well as off-beat) performance of the South African National Anthem at a rugby test match between France and South Africa in November 2009. His performance was branded as disgraceful by the South African Government, the media as well as rugby fans. His performance was cited as the reason why South Africa was defeated in that game

Dumisani released a reggae version of the anthem in 2010.

His latest album, Rise and Shine, was released in February 2011.

== Discography ==
- "Zululand Reggae" (1992), Blue Silver
- "Mister Music" (1996), Blue Silver
- "Call on Me" (2000)
- "Anthology" (2004)
- "Resistance" (2008), Flash Laser
- "Best of Ras Dumisani" (2009)
- "Rise and Shine" (2011), Rue Stendhal
- "Motherland" (2012) Rue Stendhal et Plaza Mayor Company Ltd
- "Stay at Home" (2013) Plaza Mayor Company Ltd
- "My Sunshine" (2014) Plaza Mayor Company Ltd
