= Akapusi Qera =

Fiji international rugby union player

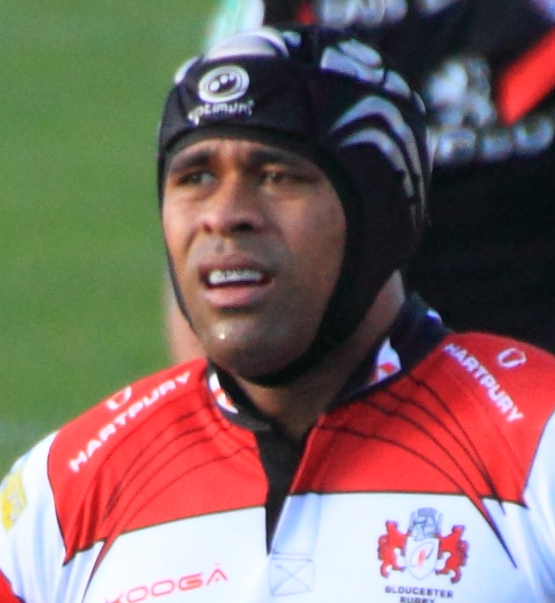
- Born: 24 April 1984 (age 42) Suva, Fiji
- Height: 1.94 m (6 ft 4 in)
- Weight: 112 kg (17 st 9 lb; 247 lb)
- School: Lelean Memorial School; Suva Grammar School; Wanganui City College
- Notable relative: Lydia Panapasa (cousin)

Rugby union career
- Position: Flanker/Number 8
Senior career
Years	Team	Apps	(Points)
2005–2006	Coastal Stallions	7	(35)
2006–2007	Pertemps Bees	27	(80)
2007–2014	Gloucester	142	(165)
2014	Toulouse	10	(0)
2014–2017	Montpellier	38	(15)
2017–2018	Agen	18	(15)
2018–2020	Hartpury University	29	(40)
- Correct as of 24 August 2015
International career
Years	Team	Apps	(Points)
2006	Fiji Warriors	6	(20)
2005–18	Fiji	65	(45)
- Correct as of 23 June 2018

Akapusi Qera (born 24 April 1984) is a Fijian professional rugby union player. A Flanker or No.8. He is married to wife Phillipha Talei and together they have four children. Qera is also from a Christian sporting family; his father was an international cricketer for Fiji and his brother also played international rugby for Fiji. He is also a first cousin of Fiji test international Viliame Veikoso. Qera is a current test international and 15's captain for Fiji Qera has also represented the Barbarians.

Whilst playing for Pertemps Bees during the 2006–2007 season he was voted Fiji rugby player of the year. Later in the season he was nominated for Fiji sportsman of the year, finishing second to golfer Vijay Singh.

A key player for Fiji during their 2007 Rugby World Cup campaign in France, he scored three tries and was later voted third in the Guinness Premiership player of the season awards for 2007–08.

Since his debut season at Gloucester, Qera has gone on to captain the Fijian national side and also be awarded the Gloucester Player of the Year award in 2010.

== Club career ==
Qera's first professional club were Colonial Cup side Coastal Stallions whom he played for during the 2005–2006 season. During his time with the Stallions, Qera made numerous representative appearances for the Fiji U21 side and Fiji Warriors before progressing to the test squad in 2005. In total Qera made seven appearances for the Stallions scoring seven tries.

Qera then relocated to play professional club rugby in England for the Pertemps Bees. During the 2006–2007 season at Pertemps Bees he was the club's top try scorer and the highest scoring forward in National Division One.

Qera moved to Gloucester, who play in the Guinness Premiership, at the start of the 2007–08 season. He scored his first try for the club against Bourgoin in a 51–27 victory for Gloucester at Kingsholm. On 17 January 2008, Qera signed a new contract with Gloucester until 2010. On 19 April 2008 Qera scored a hat-trick in Gloucester's Guinness Premiership match versus Leeds Carnegie. In May 2008 Qera was nominated for the Guinness Premiership Player of the Year award for 2007–08, eventually finishing in third place behind England internationals Olly Barkley and James Simpson-Daniel. Dean Ryan (then Gloucester head coach) said of Qera's debut Premiership season, "Akapusi's impact on the Premiership last season was tremendous and he produced a number of world class performances".

In July 2008 Qera had surgery to repair his anterior cruciate ligament and as a result he missed the start of the 2008–2009 season. Qera marked his return from injury with a try, coming off the bench to score in the corner in Gloucester's 24–22 win over London Wasps in March 2009. As a result of injury he made just 6 appearances for Gloucester during the season.

On 24 January 2010 Qera scored his second hat-trick for Gloucester in the Heineken Cup win over Newport Gwent Dragons. He finished the 2009–2010 season with 10 tries from 31 first team appearances, proving his world class scoring rate and was Gloucester's second top overall try scorer for the season. He was voted Gloucester Rugby player of the season for 2009–2010.

After suffering from Bell's Palsy towards the start of the season Qera scored his first try of the campaign against Exeter Chiefs. Further scores came against London Irish in both the LV Cup and Premiership fixtures in February. He completed the season with 20 appearances in all competitions.

During the 2011–2012 season, Qera crossed the try-line against Exeter Chiefs, Harlequins, London Wasps and Newcastle Falcons in the Premiership as well as against Toulouse in the Heineken Cup. In February 2012 he signed a two-year contract extension at Gloucester and also received his first call up for the Barbarians for their summer internationals, making his debut against England at Twickenham. Qera finished the club season having made 24 appearances in all competitions for Gloucester and was named in The Rugby Paper's Premiership XV.

A permanent fixture in the Cherry and Whites side during throughout the season, Qera crossed for scores against both London Irish and Leicester Tigers in the Premiership. He then scored in consecutive matches against London Welsh (in the LV Cup), Sale Sharks (for which he was awarded Premiership try of the week), Saracens and Harlequins. In total he made 29 appearances and was included in the 6-man shortlist for Premiership player of the season (won by Leicester and England hooker Tom Youngs). Qera made six first team appearances in for the 2013–2014 season.

On 14 December 2013, it was announced Qera would leave Gloucester mid-season in the 2013/14 season as he signed a contract to join Toulouse in the French Top 14 under the 'Medical Joker' rule, effectively on 1 January 2014.

On 14 June 2014, Qera will leave Toulouse to join Top 14 rivals Montpellier from the 2014–15 season.

On 1 June 2017, Qera signs for another French club, which is Agen, newly promoted to the Top 14 from the 2017–18 season.

On 12 December 2018, Qera returns to England to sign for Hartpury College, based near his old club Gloucester, in the RFU Championship for the remainder of the 2018–19 season.

== International career ==
Qera had represented Fiji at U19 and U21 level before making his full Fiji debut against Samoa in 2005. He was included in the Fiji sevens training squad for 2006–2007 but was unable to attend due to his Pertemps Bees contract. In 2007 he was named Fiji Rugby Player of the Year.

Qera made an impressive impact at the 2007 Rugby World Cup. After scoring in the non-cap warm up match against SC Albi, he crossed for two tries in his side's 31–35 win over Japan. Qera then played in the game against Canada four days later and also played and scored the opening try in the 38–34 victory over Wales. This win clinched Fiji's qualification to the quarter-finals in which they lost 37–20 to the eventual World Champions South Africa.

In 2008 Qera played in the summer test against Samoa, starting from the bench. He also expressed a desire to represent Fiji at the Rugby World Cup Sevens, however ultimately did not participate.

In 2009 Qera captained the national side against Scotland during Fiji's European tour.

After missing the 2010 summer tests, Qera made his first appearance in a year for Fiji in the November test against France in Nantes. He then played in the subsequent tests against Wales and Italy.

In June 2011, Fiji head coach Sam Domoni named Qera in the 43-man training squad for the 2011 Rugby World Cup to be held in New Zealand. After starting at flanker in summer tests against Japan and New Zealand, Qera was handed the captaincy for the home test versus Tonga due to the resting of World Cup captain Deacon Manu.

A surprise non-starter in Fiji's opening pool game, a 49–25 victory versus Namibia, Qera came off the bench to make his first appearance of the tournament. He subsequently started at flanker in the defeat to South Africa, before featuring off the bench in the final pool games against Samoa and Wales.

Qera received his first call-up to the Barbarians in the summer of 2012 and after making his debut against England also featured in the fixtures versus Ireland and Wales.

He originally opted to miss Fiji's 2012 European tour in favour of playing for Gloucester, however was a late inclusion to the Fiji squad ahead of their test versus England.

In May 2013 Qera was named in the Flying Fijians squad for the Pacific Nations Cup and captained the side in the 20–8 victory over Japan and 20–18 loss to Canada. In the Canada fixture Qera scored his first test try since 2007.

He has also played in non-cap matches against Australia A, SC Albi and the Junior All Blacks twice.

== International tries ==
#	Date	Venue	Opponent	Result	Competition
1	01/07/06	Nagai Stadium, Osaka	Japan	Win – 15–29	Pacific Nations Cup
2	14/07/06	Adelaide Oval, Adelaide	Australia A	Loss – 47–18	Non-cap Friendly
3	26/05/07	Churchill Park, Lautoka	Japan	Win – 30–15	Pacific Nations Cup
4	25/08/07	Stade Municipal, Camares	SC Albi	Win – 24–47	Non-cap Friendly
5	12/09/07	Stadium de Toulouse, Toulouse	Japan	Win – 35–31	2007 Rugby World Cup
6	12/09/07	Stadium de Toulouse, Toulouse	Japan	Win – 35–31	2007 Rugby World Cup
7	29/09/07	Stade de la Beaujoire, Nantes	Wales	Win – 38–34	2007 Rugby World Cup
8	05/06/13	Twin Elm Rugby Park, Nepean	Canada	Loss – 20–18	Pacific Nations Cup

== European Club statistics ==
Club	League Appearances (points)	Domestic Cup Appearances (points)	European Appearances (points)
Birmingham and Solihull	23 (80 – 16T)	4 (5 – 1T)	n/a
Gloucester Rugby	66 (80 – 14T)	15 (15 – 3T)	21 (40 – 8T)

Stats correct as of June 2012

== Awards ==
Award	Fiji Rugby Player of the Year	Fiji Sportsman of the Year	Premiership Player of the Season	Gloucester Player of the Year
Year	2007	2007	2008	2010
Position	1st	2nd	3rd	1st
