= Christine Namulumba =

Ugandan netball player

Personal information
- Full name: Christine Namulumba Kango
- Nationality: Ugandan
- Born: April 3, 2000 (age 26) Iganga, Uganda
- Education: Victoria University (B.A. Human Resource Management)

Netball career
- Playing positions: Shooter, Attacker
Years	Club team	Apps
Years	National team	Caps

Christine Namulumba (born 3rd April 2000) also known as Christine Namulumba Kango is a Ugandan professional Netball player who plays for Prisons Netball Club and the Uganda national netball team (She Cranes) as a shooter and attacker.

== Early life and education ==
Namulumba was born to Mr. Moses Kago and Ms. Elizabeth Namugolya in Iganga town, Eastern Uganda.

She started school at Bubaka Primary School, Iganga, from P.1 to P.2, later transferred to Mawagala Primary School, Iganga, for P.3-P.4. She later moved to Faith Primary School, Iganga, for P.5 and finally attended Africa Standard Academy, Iganga, for P.6 and P.7, including her Primary Leaving Examinations.

She joined secondary education at Savanah High School, Iganga, for the first two years (S.1-S.2). After that, she received an educational bursary at Madinah Islamic School, Nsangi, from S.3 to S.4. Namulumba was admitted to Buddo S.S for advanced level education, which she completed there. After advanced level, Namulumba joined Victoria University to pursue a Bachelor’s degree in Human Resource Management.

== Netball career ==
Namulumba Christine Kango

Namulumba started her netball journey from Madinah Islamic School, Nsangi in 2017. She later joined Prisons Netball Club and also played in She Cranes.

== Achievements ==
Mulumba is set to be among the She Cranes team that will represent Uganda at the continental championship, Africa Netball Cup in Nairobi.

Namulumba was among final quad for the Ugandan National Netball Team, She Cranes, final squad to take part in the Vitality Nations Netball Cup at the Motorpoint Arena in Nottingham, England.

Namulumba helped her team the Prisons netball club go unbeaten in six consecutive games during the 2022/23 Netball Super League season by scoring 181 goals in four games. During the 2022/23 Netball Super League season, she was the top scorer with 791 goals in 20 games thus winning her second accolade that she received at Lazio Restaurant and Bar – Lugogo.

Namulumba won the Fortebet Real Stars Award in netball for the month of December 2022 and she was crowned at Route 256 Restaurant in Kololo, Kampala on Tuesday, January 10, 2023. She has also been nominated as the Fortebet Real Stars Netball Player of the Month for April 2023 and May 2026.
