= Asaeli Boko =

Fijian rugby union player (born 1981)

- Born: Asaeli Boko; 16 September 1981 (age 45) Nadi, Fiji
- Height: 1.99 m (6 ft 6 in)
- Weight: 114 kg (18.0 st; 251 lb)

Rugby union career
- Position(s): Backrow (No.8 & Blindside flanker)
Senior career
| Years | Team | Apps | (Points) |
| 2010–2012 | Sale Sharks | 5 | (5) |
International career
| Years | Team | Apps | (Points) |
| 2009 | Fiji | 3 | (0) |
- Correct as of 24 December 2010

Asaeli Boko (born 16 September 1981) is a Fijian rugby union number 8 who played for Fiji and Sale Sharks. Boko, is known for his versatility and is able to pack down at second row, flanker or his favoured position of number 8. He was a key player in the Fijian's Autumn tour of 2009 starting in all three games against Ireland, Scotland and Romania. He also had a three-month trial at Saracens, looking to gain a contract for the 2010/11 season.

In October 2010, he was signed on by English club, Sale Sharks whose head coach Mike Brewer has previously worked with Boko during Fiji's 2009 Autumn Internationals.

He was dropped from the Fiji Warriors squad in February 2012. In January 2013 he joined NZ club Northland.

== Career ==
Boko is one of a select few Fijians to have played for his country at both international 7's and 15's something which is considered an honour in Fiji.
