= Asaeli Driu =

Fijian cricketer

Personal information
- Born: 1 January 1930 (age 96); Nadi, Viti Levu, Fiji
- Bowling: Left-arm fast-medium

International information
- National side: Fiji

Career statistics
Competition	FC
Matches	4
Runs scored	56
Batting average	14.00
100s/50s	–/–
Top score	16
Balls bowled	1,059
Wickets	16
Bowling average	31.75
5 wickets in innings	–
10 wickets in match	–
Best bowling	4/98
Catches/stumpings	2/–
- Source: Cricinfo, 14 March 2010

Asaeli Driu (born January 1, 1930) is a former Fijian cricketer. Driu was a left-arm fast-medium bowler.

Driu made his first-class debut for Fiji in 1954 against Otago during Fiji's 1953/54 tour of New Zealand. During the tour he played three further first-class matches, with his final first-class match for Fiji coming against Auckland.

In his 4 first-class matches for Fiji he scored 56 runs at a batting average of 14.00, with a high score of 16. With the ball he took 16 wickets at a bowling average of 31.75, with best figures of 4/98. In the field Driu took 2 catches.

Driu also represented Fiji in 22 non first-class matches for Fiji from 1954 to 1962. Driu's final match for Fiji came against Ashburton County during Fiji's 1961/62 tour of New Zealand.
