= Jonetani Ratu =

Fijian rugby union footballer (born 1977)

- Born: Jonetani Ratu; April 5, 1977 (age 49) Sigatoka, Fiji
- Height: 1.84 m (6 ft 0 in)
- Weight: 84 kg (13 st 3 lb)

Rugby union career
- Position: Inside centre
- Current team: Cagimaira, Fiji Barbarians
Senior career
| Years | Team | Apps | (Points) |
- nadroga

Jonetani Ratu is a Fijian rugby union footballer. He plays inside centre for the Fiji Barbarians and Cagimaira. He is a powerful runner with the ability to bounce off tackles and has played an important role in contributing to Nadroga's success in the Premier division.

== Career ==
Nadroga won the Telecom Fiji Cup and the Sullivan-Farebrother Trophy in 2004 Nadroga won the Colts competition in 1998. In 2005-06, Nadroga BP Oil Provincial 7's, led by Ratu.
