= Alejandro Abadie =

Argentine rugby union player (born 1985)

- Full name: Alejandro Abadie
- Born: April 13, 1985 (age 41) Argentina
- Height: 1.90 m (6 ft 3 in)
- Weight: 123 kg (19 st 5 lb)

Rugby union career
- Position: Flank
- Current team: Rovigo
International career
Years	Team	Apps	(Points)
–	Argentina	3	(0)

Alejandro Abadie (born April 13, 1985) is an Argentine rugby union footballer who plays at flank for Rovigo in Italy. He has also represented the Argentina national rugby union team.
