= Unaisi Rauluni =

Fijian netball player (born 1994)

Personal information
- Born: 18 September 1994 (age 31) Suva, Fiji
- Occupation: netball player
- School: Ratu Sukuna Memorial School

Netball career
- Playing positions: goal attack, goal shooter

Unaisi Rauluni also simply known as Una Rauluni (born 18 September 1994) is a Fijian netball player and current captain of the Fiji national team who plays in the positions of goal attack or goal shooter. She has featured in two World Cup tournaments for Fiji in 2015 and in 2019.

== Personal life ==
She was born in a family where most of her family members have involved in sports. She was born in Suva and was raised up in Qarani, Qarani. She is the daughter of late former national rugby sevens and rugby union player Vesito Rauluni. Her mother Salanieta Rauluni was also a netball player. Her uncles Taito Rauluni, Peni Rauluni, Meli Rauluni and Vili Rauluni played for the national rugby union team while her cousins Jacob Rauluni, Mosese Rauluni and Waisale Serevi have also represented the national rugby team. Her elder sister Unisi is also a netball player.

== Career ==
She made her international debut at the age of 17 in 2011. She was discovered by the then national netball coach Unaisi Rokoura and stormed into the national team for the 2011 World Netball Series which was held in Liverpool. She was also a key member of the Fijian squad which emerged as winners of the Nations Cup in 2011 for the first time defeating hosts Singapore in the final.

Unaisi was appointed as the captain of the national netball team for the 2019 Netball World Cup.
