= Netball in Niue =

Overview of the ball sport in Niue

- Country: Niue
- National team: Niue

Netball in Niue is a popular local sport. Games are most often played by girls on Saturdays between June and August, though games can be played at all times of the year. Most of the netball is played on high school athletic grounds.

== History ==
Although initially considered a women's sport, the popularity of netball is growing amongst men on the island, as sport is an important way of villages keeping in touch with each other.

There are several words for netball in the Niue language. They include neteplo, pelê neteplo, pelê.

Continuing growth of the game in the region was at times hampered by the fact that the sport is not an Olympic one. For Olympic sports, money can be tapped to help cover costs for inter-island travel for international competitions. The lack of netball being recognized meant it was hard to find money to cover these costs.

== Competition ==
Vanuatu, Tonga, Niue, the Solomon Islands, and the Cook Islands are all very competitive with each other in netball. This competitive streak is fought out at the Pacific Games.

== Bibliography ==
- Crocombe, R G (1992). Pacific neighbours : New Zealand's relations with other Pacific Islands : Aotearoa me Nga Moutere o te Moana Nui a Kiwa. Centre for Pacific Studies, University of Canterbury : Institute of Pacific Studies, University of the South Pacific. ISBN 982-02-0078-4. OCLC 28814021.
- International Federation of Netball Associations (21 January 2011a). "Current World Rankings". Archived from the original on 19 May 2011.
- MacKinnon, Rowan (2009). South Pacific [the only guide to the entire South Pacific]. Lonely Planet. ISBN 978-1-74104-786-8. OCLC 610105853.
- Sperlich, Wolfgang B (1997). Tohi vagahau Niue : Niuean-English, with English-Niuean finderlist = Niue language dictionary. Government of Niue. ISBN 0-8248-1933-0. OCLC 231713590.
- Stanley, David (2004). South Pacific handbook. Avalon Travel. ISBN 1-56691-411-6. OCLC 224404243.
- Stanley, David (1985). South Pacific handbook. Moon Publications. ISBN 0-918373-05-0. OCLC 12214632.
