= Netball in Oceania =

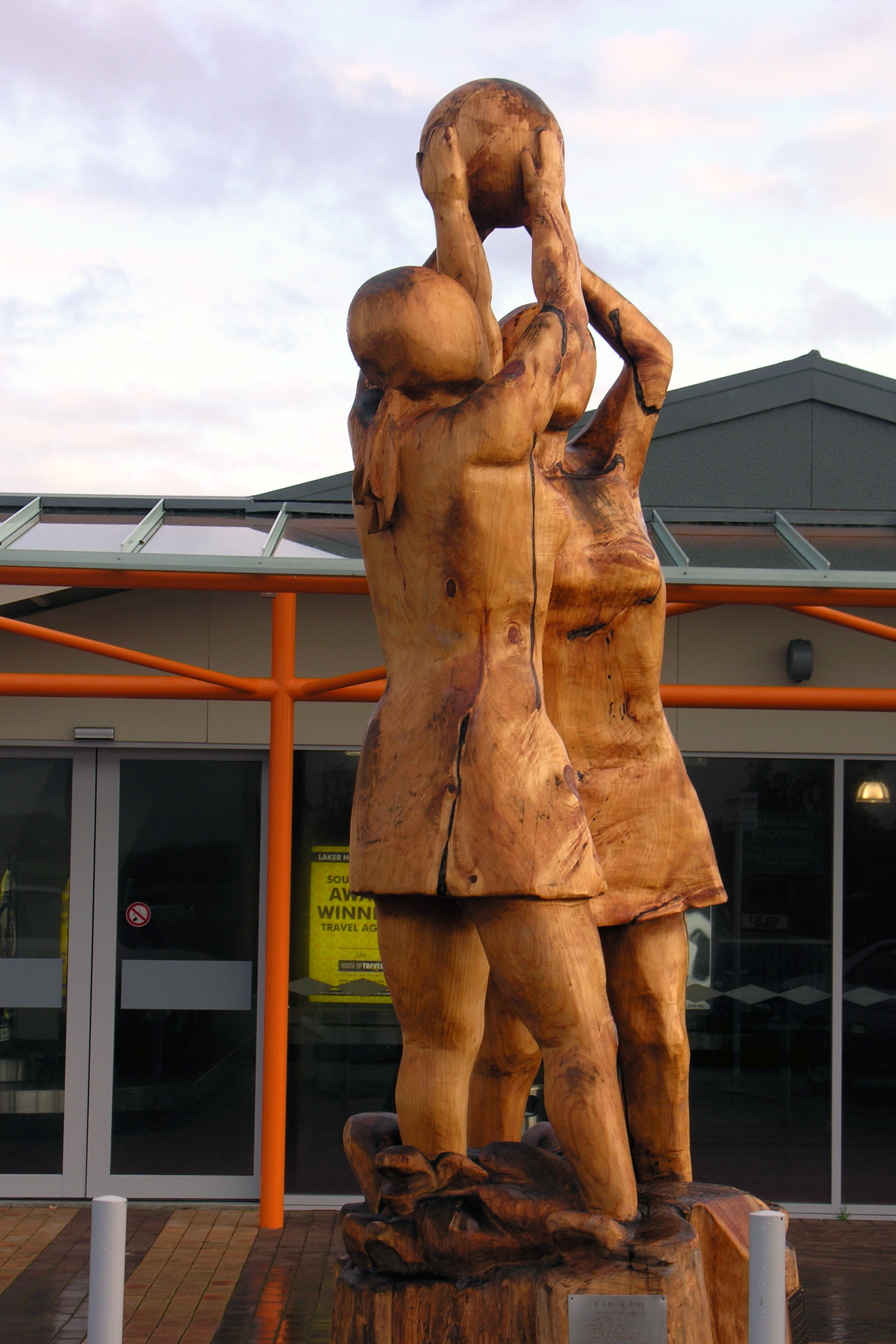
Netball sculpture in Southland, New Zealand.

Netball in Oceania is generally regarded as a woman's sport. Women's sports in Oceania have traditionally had a very low profile. Despite this, netball is popular in Oceania, with its growth partly because of New Zealand encouraging the game and providing money for the training of coaches, umpires and other netball development needs. In New Zealand and in neighbouring Australia, netball is one of the most popular sports played by women.

Netball is one of the sports at the Pacific Games, a multi-sport event, with participation from countries around the South Pacific, that is held every four years. The popularity of netball is growing amongst men on the island countries in Oceania, because sport is an important way for villages to keep in touch with each other. The game's popularity can also be seen in local languages, where words have been created to describe it. In Niue, the words include neteplo, pelê neteplo, pelê. The Oceania Netball Federation (ONF) is the governing body for netball in the Oceania region.

== New Zealand ==
In New Zealand, netball is the most popular women's participation sport. In 1984, there were 114,210 players. There are over 11,000 teams and 120,440 players. The only sport that comes close is golf, which has 128,860 male and female players. Ninety-eight percent of New Zealand netball players are female. The sports with the next highest rates of female participation are field hockey and horse racing, both at sixty-four percent. Netball is extremely popular amongst Māori women, who are more active in sport in general than their white counterparts. New Zealand took part in the 1960 netball meeting of Commonwealth countries to try to standardise the rules for the game. New Zealand has a history of netball being a spectator sport with the games being televised on TVNZ. The 1999 Netball World Championships final between Australia and New Zealand was the highest rated program ever on New Zealand television. New Zealand also has a men's national team that has competed in the 2009 and 2011 International Challenge Men's and Mixed Netball Tournaments. As of August 2016, the women's national team was ranked number two in the world.

== Cook Islands ==
The Cook Islands are a major netball playing country in Oceania, with over 1,000 registered members. The game became popular during the 1970s, and the team has been an important in the region since then. The country has participated at several international events including the Pacific Games, the Commonwealth Games, the Netball World Championships, the World Games, the Oceania Netball Tournament, the World Youth Netball Championship, and the International Challenge Men's and Mixed Netball Tournament. Netball has much grass roots support and is an important part of life for many women on the islands. Netball started to grow in popularity during the 1970s. The sport's popularity is partly due to the influence of New Zealand, where Cook Island players have competed for New Zealand's national team. New Zealand worked hard to develop the sport in the country during the 1980s, when they hosted a number of coaching and umpiring clinics. Participation in the international netball community has helped raise the Cook Islands profile globally. The Cook Islands won the netball competition at the first South Pacific Games (now Pacific Games), held in 1981. In the 1987 Netball World Championships held in Scotland the Cook Islands team came in sixth. At the World Games 1989 in Germany, the team came fourth. In the 1990 Oceania Netball Tournament, the team beat New Zealand, Tonga and Fiji to come in second, behind Australia. At the 1992 World Youth Cup in Samoa, the Cook Islands U-21 team beat several high-profile international teams including Wales, Samoa, and England. The Cook Islands defeat of Canada, 114–13, in that tournament was a record for the highest number of points scored in the tournament. The Cook Islands has a national team that competes in the international Golden Oldies netball tournament. In 2004, a team from the Cook Islands competed in the International Schoolgirls Netball Challenge. The country hosted the 2008 World Youth Championship and the 2009 International Challenge Men's and Mixed Netball Tournament. As of August 2016, the women's national team was ranked number twenty-three in the world.

== Fiji ==
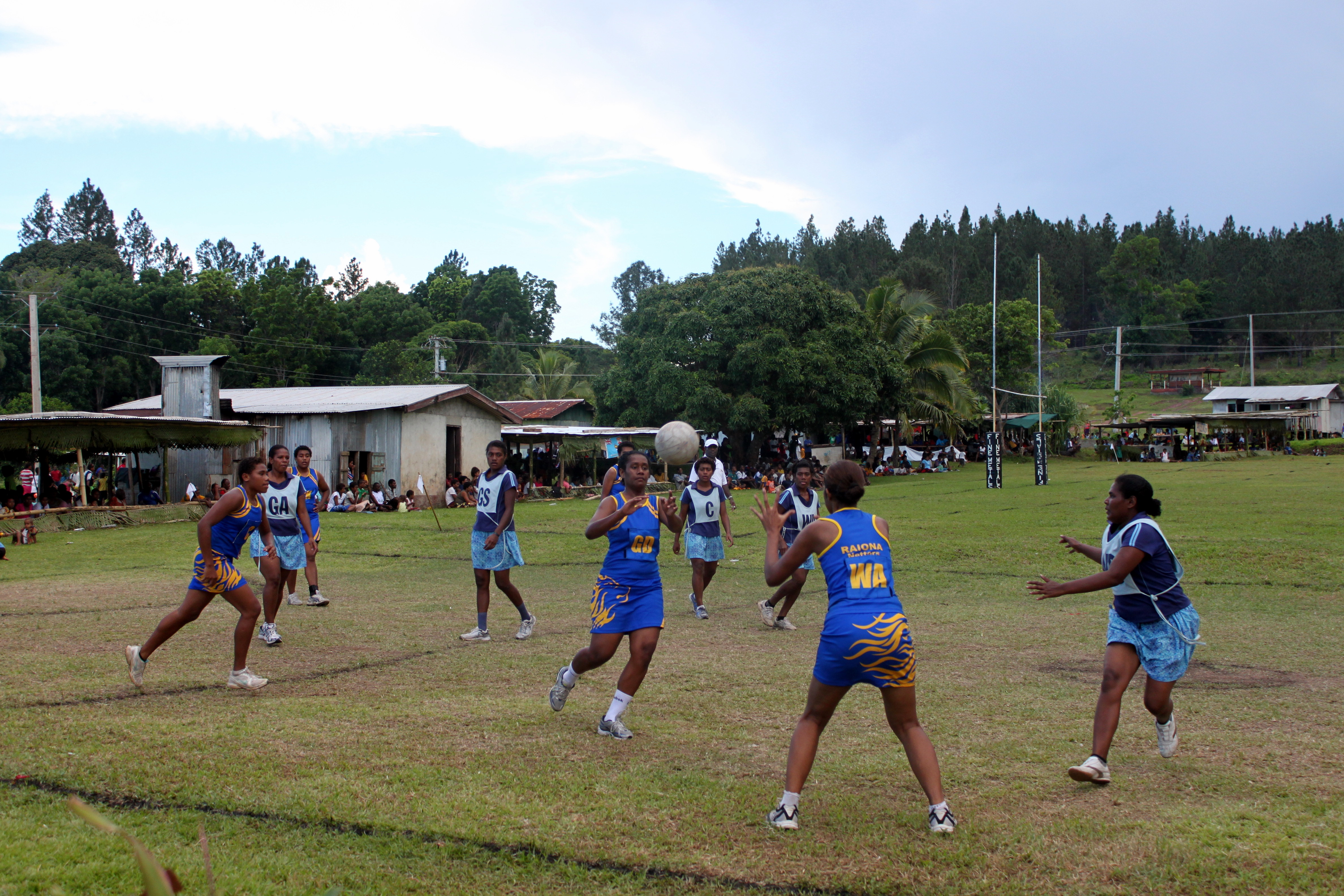
A netball competition at Natalei, Fiji.

Women's participation in netball in Fiji is comparable to men's participation in rugby. The sport started to grow in popularity during the 1970s. Netball has a large amount of grassroots support in Fiji. Games are most often played by girls on Saturdays during the winter, though games can be played at all times of the year. Samoa and Fiji are traditional netball rivals. This rivalry can be seen at events like Pacific Games. Fiji was supposed to host the 2007 World Netball Championship, but a military coup occurred. IFNA decided to move the championship to Auckland instead. Fiji has a men's national team that has competed in the 2009 and 2011 International Challenge Men's and Mixed Netball Tournament. As of August 2016, the women's national team was ranked number seven in the world.

== Samoa ==
Netball has a large amount of grassroots support in Samoa. Games are most often played by girls on Saturdays during the winter, though games can be played at all times of the year. The sport started to grow in popularity during the 1970s. Rita Fatialofa was a Samoan netball player, who later went on to compete on New Zealand's national team. She became the coach for the Samoan national team, qualifying them for every Pacific Games. Samoa and Fiji are traditional netball rivals. This rivalry can be seen at events like Pacific Games. Samoa has a men's national team that has competed in the 2009 and 2011 International Challenge Men's and Mixed Netball Tournament. At Gay Games VI held in 2000, a transgender netball team from Samoa competed. As of August 2016, the women's national team was ranked number fourteen in the world.

== National teams ==
Oceania Netball currently has 7 full members and two associate members

Full Members

Team	Association
Cook Islands	Cook Islands Netball Association
Fiji	Netball Fiji
New Zealand	Netball New Zealand
Papua New Guinea	Papua New Guinea Netball Association
Samoa	Samoa Netball Association
Solomon Islands	Solomon Islands Netball Federation
Tonga	

Associate Members

Team	Association
Niue	Niue Island Netball Association
Norfolk Island	

Other netball nations

Team	Association
American Samoa	
Kiribati	
Nauru	
Tokelau	
Tuvalu	
Vanuatu	Vanuatu Netball Association

== Bibliography ==
- Alexeyeff, Kalissa (2009). Dancing from the heart : movement, gender, and Cook Islands globalization. University of Hawaii Press. ISBN 978-0-8248-3244-5. OCLC 0824832442.
- Australian Bureau of Statistics (2006). "4177.0 – Participation in Sports and Physical Recreation, Australia 2005–06".
- Brawley, Sean (January 1997). "CHAPTER 9: The Pacific Islander Community". Sporting Immigrants: Sport & Ethnicity in Australia. EBSCOhost: 116–125.
- Cook Islands Netball Association (2009). "About Us". Archived from the original on 14 March 2011.
- Crocombe, R G (1990). Voluntary service and development in the Cook Islands. Cook Islands Extension Centre : Institute of Pacific Studies of the University of the South Pacific. ISBN 982-02-0023-7. OCLC 28814053.
- Crocombe, R G (1992). Pacific neighbours : New Zealand's relations with other Pacific Islands : Aotearoa me Nga Moutere o te Moana Nui a Kiwa. Centre for Pacific Studies, University of Canterbury : Institute of Pacific Studies, University of the South Pacific. ISBN 982-02-0078-4. OCLC 28814021.
- Crocombe, R G (2007). Asia in the Pacific Islands : replacing the West. CIPS Publications, University of the South Pacific. ISBN 982-02-0388-0. OCLC 213886360.
- Davis, Luke; Davis, Damien (2006). Netball. Getting into. Macmillan Education. ISBN 0-7329-9987-1. OCLC 156762948.
- Department of Foreign Affairs and Trade (May 2008). "About Australia: Sporting Events". Archived from the original on 5 March 2011.
- International Federation of Netball Associations (15 June 2008). "History of Netball". Archived from the original on 6 March 2011.
- International Federation of Netball Associations (21 January 2011). "Current World Rankings". Archived from the original on 19 May 2011.
- Jonassen, M; Tikivanotau, Jon (2008). "Cook Islands" (PDF). Polynesia in Review: Issues and Events, 1 July 2007 to 30 June 2008. 21 (1).
- Lal, Brij Vilash; Fortune, Kate (2000). The Pacific islands : an encyclopedia. University of Hawai'i press. ISBN 0-8248-2265-X. OCLC 468583962.
- McKinnon, Rowan (2009). South Pacific [the only guide to the entire South Pacific]. Lonely Planet. ISBN 978-1-74104-786-8. OCLC 610105853.
- Netball Singapore (2011b). "Milestones". Archived from the original on 18 February 2011.
- Pacific Islands Political Studies Association (1994). New politics in the South Pacific. Institute of Pacific Studies, University of the South Pacific in association with the Pacific Islands Political Studies Association. ISBN 982-02-0115-2. OCLC 36306453.
- Phillips, Jock (8 February 2011). "'Sports and leisure – Organised sports', Te Ara – the Encyclopedia of New Zealand".
- Samoa Observer (28 February 2011). "A journey of a thousand miles begins for Samoa national men's netball team". Samoa Observer. Archived from the original on 19 March 2012.
- School Sport Australia (2011). "Netball". Archived from the original on 9 March 2011.
- Sissions, Jeffrey (1999). Nation and destination : creating Cook Islands identity. Institute of Pacific Studies, University of the South Pacific. ISBN 982-02-0142-X. OCLC 248422251.
- Sperlich, Wolfgang B (1997). Tohi vagahau Niue : Niuean-English, with English-Niuean finderlist = Niue language dictionary. Government of Niue. ISBN 0824819330. OCLC 231713590.
- Starnes, Dean; Luckham, Nana (2009). Lonely Planet Fiji. Lonely Planet. ISBN 978-1-74104-793-6. OCLC 312626596.
- Symons, Carol; Hemphill, Dennis (November 2006). "Netball and transgender participation". In Caudwell, Jayne (ed.). Sport, sexualities and queer/theory. Routledge Critical Studies in Sport. London: Routledge. pp. 122–124. ISBN 0-415-36761-1. OCLC 66392801.
- Thompson, Shona M. (December 2002). "Women and sport in New Zealand". In Pfister, Gertrud; Hartmann-Tews, Ilse (eds.). Sport and Women: Social Issues in International Perspective. International Society for Comparative Physical Education & Sport. New York: Routledge. ISBN 0-415-24628-8. OCLC 50204306.
- Van Bottenburg, Maarten (2001). Global games. University of Illinois Press. ISBN 0-252-02654-3.
