= Netball in the Cook Islands =

Overview of the ball sport in the nation

- Flag of the Cook Islands
- Country: Cook Islands
- Governing body: Cook Islands Netball Association
- National team: Cook Islands
- Registered players: 1,000+

National competitions
- CI Netball Association Incorporated; CI Golden Oldies Netball Association; Manea Games

The Cook Islands compete as a part of netball's Oceania region. More than 1,000 players have registered to play the sport. Participation in the game grew during the 1970s. Much of this is possible because of the national governing organisation, the Cook Islands Netball Association which is a member of Oceania Netball Federation. Because of the level of organisation and the game's development, the country has participated at several international events including the Pacific Games, the Commonwealth Games, the World Games, the Oceania Netball Tournament, the World Youth Netball Championship, and the International Challenge Men's and Mixed Netball Tournament. A demonstration of the Cook Islands success can be found by looking at the national team: It is one of the top ranked in the world.

Netball has grass roots support and plays an important part in the life of women on the islands. There are over 15 netball clubs. Beyond club competitions, the game is played at schools and at national festivals like the Manea Games. The game's reach extends beyond traditional gender boundaries and is also being played by some Cook Islander men. Netball has benefited from several high visibility players and administrators, who have helped to develop the game internally and internationally.

== About the Cook Islands ==
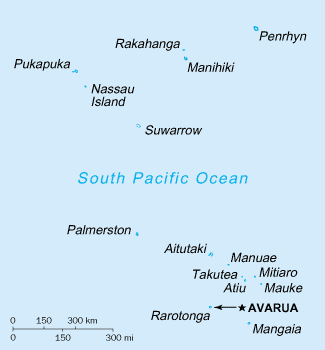
A map of the Cook Islands

The Cook Islands are an island nation, with a population of 23,400 people as of September 2010. As of 2006, there were 15,324 total residents of the Cook Islands. Of these, 7,822 were male and 7,502 were female. The most populated islands and regions were Rarotonga with 10,226 residents of whom 5,008 were female, Aitutaki with 1,975 total residents of whom 989 were female, Mangaia with 631 total residents of whom 324 were female, Atiu with 558 residents of whom 275 were female, Pukapuka with 419 total residents of whom 184 were female, Mauke with 372 total residents of whom 178 were female, and Manihiki with 344 total residents of whom 153 are female.

== Netball history and development ==
Because of a favourable climate, sport is played year round in the Cook Islands. Most sports, including netball, cricket, tennis, boxing, golf, soccer, squash and rugby union, are of European origin. The most developed and popular of them is netball, a sport in which the Cook Islands has participated on a global stage. The two most important international sport competitions that the Cook Islands participate in are the Commonwealth Games and the South Pacific Games. The Cook Islands was a major force behind the creation of the South Pacific Mini Games, participation in which has played an important role in the country's modern sporting history. Since the 1970s, the popularity of netball on the islands grew and the Cook Islands has made an effort to host these events as a way to improve facilities. During the 1970s, the Cook Islands began bidding to host international sporting events. Meanwhile, the popularity of netball grew. The sport's popularity is partly due to the influence of New Zealand, where Cook Island players have competed for New Zealand's national team. One such player was Margharet Matenga, who joined the Silver Ferns in 1979. Another was Anna Noovao, who was the captain of the New Zealand side in 1992. New Zealand encouraged the sport in the Cook Islands during the 1980s by hosting coaching and umpiring clinics. There are a number of athletes from the Cook Islands who reside overseas. This is especially true of netball. Some commentators state that living abroad has provided these athletes with access to facilities and levels of higher competition that they cannot get at home.

In 1991, the Government of the Cook Islands identified the lack of funding for sport facilities as a key reason why the nation has not succeeded at international competitions. It believed that investing in sporting infrastructure would enable the nation to be more globally competitive. Netball was not recognised as an Olympic sport until 1995. While official recognition as an Olympic sport did not mean that it was played at the Olympics, it did mean that the national association and the Cook Islands government could then access Olympic funding to help cover costs for facilities, travel, coaching, umpire training and other grass roots development efforts. The Cook Islands Netball Association is the governing body for the sport in the Cook Islands, and historically, the sport has been administered by women. Most netball courts are owned by the local village or club. With the exception of National Auditorium, all courts are outside. In 1990, the Cook Islands Netball Association had 15 clubs affiliated with it, all based in the southern islands group, including Ngatangia/Matavera, Avatiu/Nikao, Arorangi, Titikaveka, Takuvaine, Tupapa, Outer Islands.

The South Pacific Mini Games is a sporting event televised by a local Cook Islands television station. Sports contested at the games included netball. These games were televised, with funding to buy the rights being provided by the West German Government and the Government of the Cook Islands. In 2008, the first live broadcast of a netball game happened on television in the Cook Islands when the Silver Ferns played the Aussie Diamonds on 29 September.

The Manea Games are an annual eleven-day sport festival. The fifth version of the festival was held in 2008 at Aitutaki. The 2011 edition of the games were held in Mangaia. Sports represented at the games include netball, athletics, cricket, darts, soccer, rugby sevens, table tennis, tennis, touch rugby, volleyball and traditional games. The games are taken very seriously across all sports. Girls competing at netball compete with the hope of one day competing at the international level.

In 1992, the government detailed its national sport objectives. These objectives included promoting youth activity in order to improve quality of life, encourage young people to participate in national celebrations, develop and organize local sport, and foster a sense of competition and national unity in the sporting community across the village, national and international sphere. While not specifically mentioning netball, it did acknowledge the importance of the sport in terms of international prestige. One of the strategies to help meet those objectives was to strengthen national sporting bodies like the netball association. This worked; by 2009, there were more than 1,000 players registered with the Cook Islands Netball Association. (Note: The International Federation of Netball Associations (IFNA) contradicts this number, listing the total number of players at 600 on http://www.netball.org/Members.aspx?id=52.)

As of December 2025, there is a plan to have a local showcase of Netball in the PacificAus Sports Netball Challenge. Netball Australia in partnership with the Australian Government will put on the tournament from November 23 to 28 in Brisbane, Australia.

== Grass roots netball ==
There are at least three netball courts on the island of Atiu, which has a population of around 650. The netball and tennis rivalries between villagers on the island is fierce, and they built the netball facilities to help them win. The island has nine tennis courts, which used more often for playing netball, volleyball and soccer than tennis. There are a number of netball teams affiliated with schools on Atiu. Each has its own colours: Teenui wears blue on top and white on the bottom;Tengatangi and Mapumai wears green on top and white on the bottom; Ngatirua wears black on top and bottom; and Areora wears red on top and white on the bottom. The Girls' Brigade, Girl Guides and Junior Missionary Volunteers also have their own uniforms and colours.

Netball is played on the island of Aitutaki. Other sports played on the island include rugby union, rugby sevens, association football, cricket, volleyball, darts, tennis, badminton, ping pong and athletics.

Netball plays an important role on the social life of Cook Island women. For their social activities, rather than go to bars, they play netball and go to church. Netball games are most often played on Saturdays during the winter months from April to August, though games can be played throughout the year. Female players who make the national team are treated like minor celebrities.

Traditionally, on village feast days, several sport competitions are held including netball, rugby and dance.

The Cook Islands Golden Oldies Netball Association is a local league that is part of a network of leagues in various sports aimed at seniors. Belonging to these teams offers seniors a chance to travel that they might not be able to afford otherwise because of the high cost of transportation from the Cook Islands to other locations.

== Men's netball ==
Unlike some countries, the growth of men's netball is hampered by cultural bias against it; when parents see their boys playing it, they actively discourage them from continuing. Despite this, the Cook Islands also has a men's national team that has competed in the 2006, 2009 and 2011 International Challenge Men's and Mixed Netball Tournament. The popularity of netball is growing amongst men on the island, as sport is an important way of villages keeping in touch with each other.

At the Easter sports day, organised by the Christian Youth Organization, traditional roles are exchanged and boys play netball while girls play rugby. During this sporting event, the boys cross dress and wear the uniforms that are traditionally worn by women. (Note: Most of the men and boys who play in these gender subverting netball games are straight, though a few of the men are laelae.)

== People ==
Many people have been important in the push to develop the game in the Cook Islands and raise the profile of the national netball team on the global stage. They include Anna Noovao, who was the captain of the 1992 New Zealand side, Margharet Matenga, who was the first Cook Islands player to play for New Zealand's national team, and Mamia, who was the secretary of the Cook Islands Netball Association for six years. Mamia was an umpire and an umpire examiner for the Oceania region. She attended South Pacific Games in Micronesia, the Commonwealth Games in Malaysia, and the Olympic Games in Sydney. Mamia was a national representative for teams that had competed in the South Pacific Games during the 1980s. Tina Browne was president of the Cook Islands Netball Association. Elizabeth Tou was coach of the national team from 2005 to 2007. She represented the country as a player at Pacific Games, Commonwealth Games and the World Championships.

== International ==
Colours of the national team uniform

The Cook Islands Netball Association is a member of the Oceania Netball Federation. The nation's participation in the international netball community has raised the islands' visibility globally. The Cook Islands won the netball competition at the first South Pacific Games, now Pacific Games, held in 1981. The national team had its first win in the tournament in 1983, when it beat Fiji. In 1986, the government provided NZ$20,000 to help the team travel to the 1986 Commonwealth Games in Scotland. The 1987 Netball World Championships were also held in Scotland, and the Cook Islands team came in sixth. At the World Games 1989 in Germany, the team came fourth. In the 1990 Oceania Netball Tournament, the team defeated New Zealand, Tonga and Fiji to come in second behind Australia. In January 2011, the national team was ranked eleventh in the world.

At the 1992 World Youth Cup in Samoa, the Cook Islands U-21 team defeated several high-profile international teams including Wales, Samoa, and England. The Cook Islands' defeat of Canada, 114–13, in that tournament was a record for the highest score in the tournament. The Cook Islands also has a national team that competes in the international Golden Oldies netball tournament. In 2004, a team from the Cook Islands competed in the International Schoolgirls Netball Challenge. The country hosted the 2008 World Youth Championship, and the 2009 International Challenge Men's and Mixed Netball Tournament. In 2011, a New Zealander, Margaret Foster, was appointed as head coach of the development squad. One of her goals was to improve the team's fitness levels.

In the lead up to the 2009 World Youth Championship, there was considerable anxiety over the facilities, and whether they would be up to world standards. The Prime Minister of the Cook Islands reconfirmed that his government would deliver a new venue. Because of this, the International Netball Federation reaffirmed their support for hosting the event in the Cook Islands. The Chinese government offered to step in and loan the country NZ$9,300,000 to help pay the costs for constructing the facility. (Note: Some of the money from this loan was also to assist the government with the relocation of the Ministry of Education offices.) The loan was controversial as some organisations felt the country had misplaced priorities. During the planning and preparation period in the lead up to the 2009 World Youth Championship, the government sought to increase the size of the loan for the facility to NZ$13,000,000. The opposition leader Norman George was unhappy with how the government handled the whole situation regarding new sporting facilities to be built for the World Youth Netball Championships and the 2009 Pacific Mini Games.

=== Competitive history ===
The table below contains a sample of the Cook Islands results in international competitions.

Year(s)	Competition	Result
1987	Netball World Championships	Sixth
1989	World Games	Fourth
1990	Oceania Netball Tournament	Second
1992	World Youth Cup	Third
1999	World Youth Cup	Sixth
2010	Commonwealth Games	Tenth

The table below contains sample of Cook Islands results in individual international matches.

Year	Event	Opponent	Date	Venue	Cook Islands	Opponent	Winner	Ref.
1987	World championships	New Zealand		Glasgow, Scotland	27	78	New Zealand	
1989	World Games	Australia	26‐Jul	Europhalle Karlsrhue, West Germany	22	62	Australia	
1991	World championships	New Zealand		Sydney, New South Wales	40	94	New Zealand	
1992	World Youth Cup	Canada			114	13	Cook Islands	
1995	World Championships	Australia	24‐Jul	National Indoor Arena, Birmingham	45	79	Australia	
2003	World Championships	New Zealand		Independence Stadium, Kingston, Jamaica	17	107	New Zealand	
2004	International Mens and Mixed Netball Challenge Cup	Australia Australian Men's Open	7-Aug	Australia	24	80	Australia Australian Men's Open	
2004	International Mens and Mixed Netball Challenge Cup	Fiji Fiji Open Men	10-Aug	Australia	36	42	Fiji Fiji Open Men	
2004	International Mens and Mixed Netball Challenge Cup	Fiji Fiji Open Men	9-Aug	Australia	27	65	Fiji Fiji Open Men	
2004	International Mens and Mixed Netball Challenge Cup	New Zealand New Zealand Open Men	9-Aug	Australia	22	82	New Zealand New Zealand Open Men	
2004	International Mens and Mixed Netball Challenge Cup	Australia Australia	10-Aug	Australia	35	63	Australia Australia	
2004	International Mens and Mixed Netball Challenge Cup	Australia Australia	7-Aug	Australia	22	57	Australia Australia	
2004	International Mens and Mixed Netball Challenge Cup	Fiji Fiji 1	11-Aug	Australia	50	67	Fiji Fiji 1	
2004	International Mens and Mixed Netball Challenge Cup	Fiji Fiji 2	11-Aug	Australia	47	49	Fiji Fiji 2	
2004	International Mens and Mixed Netball Challenge Cup	New Zealand New Zealand	12-Aug	Australia	56	87	New Zealand New Zealand	
2007	World Champs	Australia	15‐Nov	Trust Stadium, Auckland, NZ	22	90	Australia	
2009	World Youth Netball Championships	Wales	10‐Aug	National Stadium, Cook Islands	43	37	Cook Islands	
2009	World Youth Netball Championships	Malaysia	11‐Aug	National Stadium, Cook Islands	70	36	Cook Islands	
2009	World Youth Netball Championships	Vanuatu	13‐Aug	National Stadium, Cook Islands	82	24	Cook Islands	
2009	World Youth Netball Championships	England	14‐Aug	National Stadium, Cook Islands	31	58	England	
2009	World Youth Netball Championships	Australia	17‐Aug	National Stadium, Cook Islands	17	86	Australia	
2009	World Youth Netball Championships	South Africa	18‐Aug	National Stadium, Cook Islands	55	48	Cook Islands	
2009	World Youth Netball Championships	Malawi	20‐Aug	National Stadium, Cook Islands	48	61	Malawi	
2010	Pacific Netball Series	Papua New Guinea	3‐Jun	Telecom Sports Arena	59	57	Cook Islands	
2010	Pacific Netball Series	Fiji	4‐Jun	Telecom Sports Arena	32	46	Fiji	
2010	Pacific Netball Series	Samoa	5‐Jun	Telecom Sports Arena	46	56	Samoa	
2010	Commonwealth Games	New Zealand	5‐Oct	Thyagaraj Sports Complex, Delhi, India	24	87	New Zealand	
2010	Commonwealth Games	Barbados	6‐Oct	Thyagaraj Sports Complex, Delhi, India	46	60	Barbados	
2010	Commonwealth Games	England	8‐Oct	Thyagaraj Sports Complex, Delhi, India	33	81	England	
2010	Commonwealth Games	Papua New Guinea	9‐Oct	Thyagaraj Sports Complex, Delhi, India	60	58	Cook Islands	
2010	Commonwealth Games	South Africa	10‐Oct	Thyagaraj Sports Complex, Delhi, India	73	40	South Africa	
2010	Commonwealth Games	Samoa	11‐Oct	Thyagaraj Sports Complex, Delhi, India	43	68	Samoa	

== Bibliography ==
- Alexeyeff, Kalissa (2009). Dancing from the heart : movement, gender, and Cook Islands globalization. University of Hawaii Press. ISBN 978-0-8248-3244-5. OCLC 0824832442.
- Alexeyeff, Kalissa (2000). "Dragging Drag: The Performance of Gender and Sexuality in the Cook Islands". The Australian Journal of Anthropology. 11 (2): 297–307. doi:10.1111/j.1835-9310.2000.tb00045.x.
- Berry, Oliver; Hunt, Errol (2006). Rarotonga & the Cook Islands. Lonely Planet. ISBN 1-74059-083-X. OCLC 456554706.
- Bynum, Mike (2011). Greatest Moments in New Zealand Netball History. Netball New Zealand. ISBN 978-1-928846-09-3. OCLC 696608466.
- Commonwealth Games 2010 Delhi (2010). "Detailed Schedule – Netball". Archived from the original on 8 October 2010.
- Cook Islands Netball Association (2009). "About Us". Archived from the original on 14 March 2011.
- Cook Islands Netball Association (2011). "Pacific Netball Series".
- Cook Islands News (5 August 2009). "Jasmine's all go for WYNC".
- Cook Islands Sports and National Olympic Committee (2011). "Cook Islands Sports and National Olympic Committee".
- Cook Statistics Office (September 2010). "Population estimates and vital statistics".
- Cook Statistics Office (2006). "Resident Population by Sex, Census District and Ethnic Origin" (PDF). Archived from the original (PDF) on 22 March 2012.
- Crocombe, R G (1992). Pacific neighbours : New Zealand's relations with other Pacific Islands : Aotearoa me Nga Moutere o te Moana Nui a Kiwa. Centre for Pacific Studies, University of Canterbury : Institute of Pacific Studies, University of the South Pacific. ISBN 982-02-0078-4. OCLC 28814021.
- Crocombe, R G (2007). Asia in the Pacific Islands : replacing the West. CIPS Publications, University of the South Pacific. ISBN 978-982-02-0388-4. OCLC 213886360.
- Crocombe, R G (1990). Voluntary service and development in the Cook Islands. Cook Islands Extension Centre : Institute of Pacific Studies of the University of the South Pacific. ISBN 982-02-0023-7. OCLC 28814053.
- Crocombe, R G; Crocombe, M T (1997). "The Cook Islands in Review: Issues and Events, 1 July 1995 to 30 June 1996".
- Donnan, Hastings; Magowan, Fiona (2009). Transgressive sex : subversion and control in erotic encounters. Fertility, reproduction, and sexuality. Berghahn Books. ISBN 978-1-84545-539-2. OCLC 227033742.
- Edge, Sandra; Romanos, Joseph (1995). Full Circle. Auckland, New Zealand: Hodder Moa Beckett. ISBN 1-86958-202-0.
- Hollis, Renee (2007). Aitutaki, Heaven on Earth. Nelson, New Zealand: Renee Hollis. ISBN 978-0-473-14603-0.
- Huffer, Elise (2006). "Desk Review of the Factors Which Enable and Constrain the Advancement of Women's Political Representation in Forum Island Countries" (PDF).
- International Federation of Netball Associations (21 January 2011a). "Current World Rankings". Archived from the original on 19 May 2011.
- International Federation of Netball Associations (2010). "Cook Islands".
- International Mens and Mixed Netball Challenge Cup (8 September 2004). "New World Body Formed". International Mens and Mixed Netball Challenge Cup.
- Johannsen, Dana (19 September 2008). "Netball's long road to equality". The New Zealand Herald. Auckland, New Zealand.
- Jonassen, M; Tikivanotau, Jon (2008). "Cook Islands" (PDF). Polynesia in Review: Issues and Events, 1 July 2007 to 30 June 2008. 21 (1).
- Kautai, Ngatupuna; Malcolm, Teatu Kura; Mokoroa, Paiere; Tanga, Tatuava; Tanga, Terepai; Tangatapoto, Vainerere; Tatuava, Tekura; Touna, Tane Ra (1984). Atiu : an island community. South Pacific Books. ISBN 982-02-0163-2. OCLC 216659154.
- Lal, Brij Vilash; Fortune, Kate (2000). The Pacific islands : an encyclopedia. University of Hawai'i press. ISBN 0-8248-2265-X. OCLC 468583962.
- Lee, Helen; Francis, Steve Tupai (2009). Migration and transnationalism : Pacific perspectives. ANU E Press. ISBN 978-1-921536-90-8. OCLC 456252224.
- MacKinnon, Rowan (2009). South Pacific [the only guide to the entire South Pacific]. Lonely Planet. ISBN 978-1-74104-786-8. OCLC 610105853.
- Manea Games (2011). "News & Updates".
- Ministry of Planning & Economic Development (1992). Government of the Cook Islands: Second Development Plan (1988–1992). Cook Islands Ministry of Planning & Economic Development.
- Momoedonu, Tevita (8 December 2008). "Teva Vows to Spread Men Netball".
- Netball Australia (3 November 2008). "Australian Results vs. Cook Islands" (PDF).
- Netball Australia (2007). "1987–2007" (PDF).
- Netball New Zealand (3 August 2009). "History".
- Netball Singapore (2011b). "Milestones". Archived from the original on 18 February 2011.
- ninemsn (23 September 2010). "Cook Island Olympics".
- Pacific Mini Games Cook Islands 2009 (2000). "1985 Mini Games".
- Pacific Islands Political Studies Association (1994). New politics in the South Pacific. Institute of Pacific Studies, University of the South Pacific in association with the Pacific Islands Political Studies Association. ISBN 982-02-0115-2. OCLC 36306453.
- Radio New Zealand (31 July 2006). "A mixed and men's International netball tournament begins in Fiji later this month".
- Reilly, Geoff; Wren, Wendy (2003). Nelson Thornes framework English. 3. Nelson Thornes. ISBN 0-7487-6953-6. OCLC 54518821.
- Samoa Observer (28 February 2011). "A journey of a thousand miles begins for Samoa national men's netball team". Samoa Observer. Archived from the original on 19 March 2012.
- School Sport Australia (2011). "Netball". Archived from the original on 9 March 2011.
- Sissions, Jeffrey (1999). Nation and destination : creating Cook Islands identity. Institute of Pacific Studies, University of the South Pacific. ISBN 982-02-0142-X. OCLC 248422251.
- Smartt, Pam; Chalmers, David (29 January 2009). "Obstructing the goal? Hospitalisation for netball injury in New Zealand 2000–2005". The New Zealand Medical Journal. 122 (1288): 62–75. PMID 19182843. Archived from the original on 17 March 2011.
- South Australian Mens Netball Association (2009). "South Australian Mens Netball Association, Annual General Meeting 2008/09, Monday the 14th of December 2009 6.45pm, ETSA Park Stadium" (PDF).
- Stanley, David (2004). South Pacific handbook. Avalon Travel. ISBN 1-56691-411-6. OCLC 224404243.
- Taylor, Tracy (November 2001). "Gendering Sport: The Development of Netball in Australia" (PDF). Sporting Traditions, Journal of the Australian Society for Sports History. 18 (1): 57–74. Archived from the original (PDF) on 2 April 2012.
- Turk, Peter. "History of Men's Netball". International Mens and Mixed Netball Challenge Cup.
- Wilson, Matariki (15 January 2011). "Ex Silver Fern to coach Cooks". Archived from the original on 19 May 2011.
- World Youth Netball Championships – Cook Island 2009 (2009). "Results".
