= Netball in Vanuatu =

Overview of the ball sport in Vanuatu

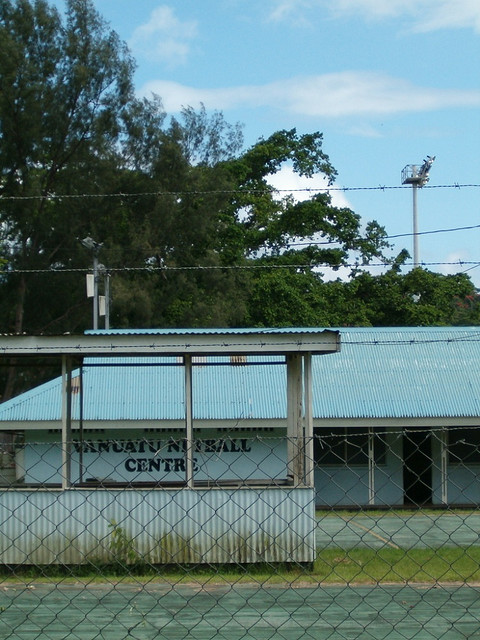
- The Vanuatu Netball Centre
- Country: Vanuatu
- National team: Vanuatu

Netball has a large amount of grassroots support in Vanuatu. Games are most often played by girls on Saturdays during the winter, though games can be played at all times of the year. Continuing growth of the game in Vanuatu was at times hampered by the fact that the sport is not an Olympic one. The Olympic Solidarity Movement provides much access to funding through the International Olympic Committee. For Olympic sports, money can be tapped to help cover costs for inter-island travel for international competitions. The lack of netball being recognized meant it was hard to find money to cover these costs.
