= Wainikiti Bogidrau =

Fijian netball administrator

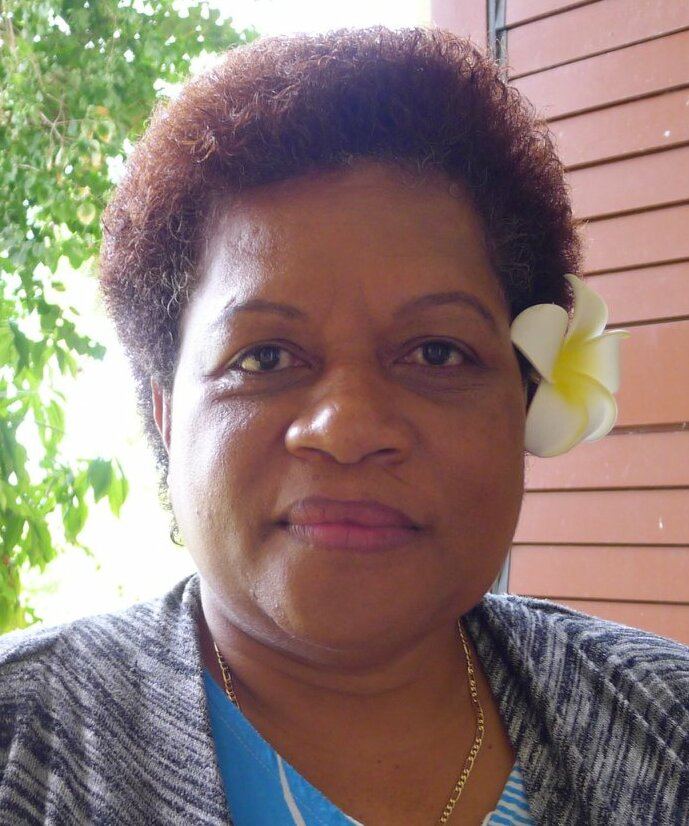

President of Fiji Netball Association
- In office 2010–2020

President of Oceania Netball Federation
- In office 2019–2025
- Preceded by: Tina Browne

Personal details
- Born: 23 November 1968 Fiji
- Died: 7 January 2025 (aged 56)
- Education: University of the South Pacific; University of Hawaiʻi at Mānoa
- Occupation: Manager at Fiji National Provident Fund

Wainikiti (Kiti) Naivalulevu Waqa Bogidrau (23 November 1968 – 7 January 2025) was a Fijian former president of the Fiji Netball Association (2010–2020), president of the Oceania Netball Federation and a board member of World Netball.

== Early life ==
Bogidrau obtained a BA in sociology in 2000, specializing in population studies and demography, from the University of the South Pacific in Suva, capital of Fiji, where she won four gold medals on graduation, including the Vice-Chancellor's gold medal for the most outstanding academic and community service record for a female student. She obtained an MA in Pacific Island Studies from the University of Hawaiʻi at Mānoa in Honolulu in 2004. She later received a post-graduate diploma in public administration from the same university. She married Major Setareki Bogidrau, a senior officer in Fiji's army.

== Career ==
Bogidrau began her working career with three Fijian newspapers, the Daily Post, the Fiji Sun, and the Fiji Times. In 2006 she joined the Fiji National Provident Fund, the largest financial institution in Fiji, and in 2020 was head of research and product development at the Fund.

== Netball administration ==
Bogidrau played netball from primary school, in secondary school, and later in club competition. She continued to play social netball in business-house competitions. From 2000 she began to work in netball administration on a voluntary basis and in 2010 she was appointed president of the Fiji Netball Association. She was elected president of the Oceania Netball Federation in 2019 and, on the basis of this role, became a member of the board of World Netball, becoming the first Fijian to hold these positions.

== Death ==
Bogidrau died on 7 January 2025. She was buried in Nasinu cemetery.
