= Netball at the 2009 South Pacific Mini Games =

Netball at the 2009 Pacific Mini Games
- Location: Cook Islands - Rarotonga
- Dates: September 2009
- Teams: 6

Medalists
gold medal	Fiji
silver medal	Papua New Guinea
bronze medal	Cook Islands

Netball at the 2009 Pacific Mini Games in Rarotonga, Cook Islands was held during September 2009.

== Preliminary round ==
=== Pool A ===
	P	W	L	Pts	F	A	F/A
Papua New Guinea	2	2	0	4	134	90	+44
Cook Islands	2	1	1	2	128	95	+33
Niue	2	0	2	0	55	132	−77

Qualified for the semifinals

September 2009	Cook Islands	65 – 28	Niue

September 2009	Papua New Guinea	67 – 27	Niue

September 2009	Papua New Guinea	67 – 63	Cook Islands

=== Pool B ===
	P	W	L	Pts	F	A	F/A
Fiji	2	2	0	4	115	59	+56
Tokelau	2	1	1	2	69	93	-24
Tonga	2	0	2	0	68	100	−32

Qualified for the semifinals

September 2009	Fiji	58 – 32	Tonga

September 2009	Tokelau	42 – 36	Tonga

September 2009	Fiji	57 – 27	Tokelau

== 5th/6th match ==
September 2009	Tonga	52 – 44	Niue

=== Semi-finals ===
September 2009	Fiji	52 – 50	Cook Islands

September 2009	Papua New Guinea	58 – 35	Tokelau

=== Third place match ===
September 2009	Cook Islands	64 – 31	Tokelau

=== Final ===
September 2009	Fiji	58 – 51	Papua New Guinea

== Final standings ==
Place	Nation
Gold	Fiji
Silver	Papua New Guinea
Bronze	Cook Islands
4	Tokelau
5	Tonga
6	Niue

== See also ==
- Netball at the Pacific Mini Games
