= Netball at the 2003 South Pacific Games =

Netball at the 2003 Pacific Games
- Location: Suva, Fiji
- Dates: from 28 June to 12 July 2003
- Teams: 8

Medalists
gold medal	Fiji
silver medal	Papua New Guinea
bronze medal	Cook Islands

Netball at the 2003 Pacific Games in Suva, Fiji was held from 28 June to 12 July 2003.

== Results ==
=== Pool A ===
	P	W	D	L	PTS	F	A	%
Fiji	3	3	0	0	6	246	62	396.77
Samoa	3	2	0	1	4	157	152	103.29
Vanuatu	3	1	0	2	2	120	198	60.61
Tonga	3	0	0	3	0	104	215	48.37

Qualified for the semifinals
Qualified for consolation games

3o June 2003	Fiji	91 – 19	Tonga	Suva, Fiji

Samoa	68 – 42	Vanuatu	Suva, Fiji

1 July 2003	Tonga	46 – 63	Vanuatu	Suva, Fiji

Fiji	71 – 28	Samoa	Suva, Fiji

2 July 2003	Fiji	84 – 15	Vanuatu	Suva, Fiji

Tonga	39 – 61	Samoa	Suva, Fiji

=== Pool B ===
	P	W	D	L	PTS	F	A	%
Papua New Guinea	3	3	0	0	6	218	114	191.23
Cook Islands	3	2	0	1	4	216	115	187.83
Solomon Islands	3	1	0	2	2	162	181	89.50
Niue	3	0	0	3	0	64	250	25.60

Qualified for the semifinals
Qualified for consolation games

30 June 2003	Papua New Guinea	88 – 14	Niue	Suva, Fiji

Solomon Islands	41 – 75	Cook Islands	Suva, Fiji

1 July 2003	Niue	35 – 74	Solomon Islands	Suva, Fiji

Cook Islands	53 – 59	Papua New Guinea	Suva, Fiji

2 July 2003	Niue	15 – 74	Cook Islands	Suva, Fiji

Papua New Guinea	71 – 47	Solomon Islands	Suva, Fiji

=== Semi-finals ===
3 July 2003	Report	Fiji	60 – 51	Cook Islands	Suva, Fiji

Report	Papua New Guinea	74 – 46	Samoa	Suva, Fiji

=== Consolation matches ===
3 July 2003	Report	Vanuatu	49 – 39	Niue	Suva, Fiji

Report	Solomon Islands	59 – 64	Tonga	Suva, Fiji

==== 7th/8th playoff ====
4 July 2003	Report	Solomon Islands	85 – 23	Niue	Suva, Fiji

==== 5th/6th playoff ====
4 July 2003	Report	Vanuatu	60 – 61	Tonga	Suva, Fiji

=== Bronze-medal match ===
4 July 2003	Report	Cook Islands	55 – 41	Samoa	Suva, Fiji

=== Gold-medal match ===
4 July 2003	Report	Fiji	59 – 43	Papua New Guinea	Suva, Fiji

== Final standings ==
Place	Nation
Gold	Fiji
Silver	Papua New Guinea
Bronze	Cook Islands
4	Samoa
5	Tonga
6	Vanuatu
7	Solomon Islands
8	Niue

== See also ==
- Netball at the Pacific Games
