= Netball at the 2007 South Pacific Games =

Netball at the 2007 Pacific Games
- Location: Samoa - Apia
- Dates: from 27 August - 1 September 2007
- Teams: 8

Medalists
gold medal	Fiji
silver medal	Samoa
bronze medal	Papua New Guinea

Netball at the 2007 Pacific Games in Apia, Samoa was held from 27 August - 1 September 2007.

== Results ==
=== Pool A ===
	P	W	D	L	PTS	F	A	%
Fiji	3	3	0	0	6	247	65	380.00
Cook Islands	3	2	0	1	4	166	118	140.68
Solomon Islands	3	1	0	2	2	122	172	70.93
Norfolk Island	3	0	0	3	0	59	239	24.69

Qualified for the semifinals
Qualified for consolation games

27 August 2007	Report	Norfolk Island	9 – 93	Fiji	Apia, Samoa

Report	Solomon Islands	35 – 51	Cook Islands	Apia, Samoa

28 August 2007	Report	Cook Islands	83 – 15	Norfolk Island	Apia, Samoa

Report	Solomon Islands	24 – 86	Fiji	Apia, Samoa

29 August 2007	Report	Norfolk Island	35 – 63	Solomon Islands	Apia, Samoa

Report	Fiji	68 – 32	Cook Islands	Apia, Samoa

=== Pool B ===
	P	W	D	L	PTS	F	A	%
Samoa	3	3	0	0	6	181	93	194.62
Papua New Guinea	3	2	0	1	4	201	100	201
Tokelau	3	1	0	2	2	126	133	94.74
Vanuatu	3	0	0	3	0	55	237	23.21

Qualified for the semifinals
Qualified for consolation games

27 August 2007	Report	Samoa	46 – 33	Tokelau	Apia, Samoa

Report	Vanuatu	16 – 93	Papua New Guinea	Apia, Samoa

28 August 2007	Report	Papua New Guinea	62 – 33	Tokelau	Apia, Samoa

Report	Samoa	84 – 14	Vanuatu	Apia, Samoa

29 August 2007	Report	Samoa	51 – 46	Papua New Guinea	Apia, Samoa

Report	Tokelau	60 – 25	Vanuatu	Apia, Samoa

=== Semi-finals ===
31 August 2007	Report	Samoa	67 – 37	Cook Islands	Apia, Samoa

Report	Papua New Guinea	51 – 59	Fiji	Apia, Samoa

=== Consolation matches ===
31 August 2007	Report	Vanuatu	28 – 56	Solomon Islands	Apia, Samoa

Report	Tokelau	64 – 32	Norfolk Island	Apia, Samoa

==== 7th/8th playoff ====
1 September 2007	Report	Vanuatu	38 – 39	Norfolk Island	Apia, Samoa

==== 5th/6th playoff ====
1 September 2007	Report	Solomon Islands	48 – 58	Tokelau	Apia, Samoa

=== Bronze-medal match ===
1 September 2007	Report	Cook Islands	43 – 71	Papua New Guinea	Apia, Samoa

=== Gold-medal match ===
1 September 2007	Report	Fiji	52 – 41	Samoa	Apia, Samoa

== Final standings ==
Place	Nation
Gold	Fiji
Silver	Samoa
Bronze	Papua New Guinea
4	Cook Islands
5	Tokelau
6	Solomon Islands
7	Norfolk Island
8	Vanuatu

== See also ==
- Netball at the Pacific Games
