= Netball at the 2017 Pacific Mini Games =

- Location: Vanuatu - Port Vila
- Dates: 13–15 December 2017
- Teams: 4

Medalists
gold medal	Papua New Guinea
silver medal	Tonga
bronze medal	Solomon Islands

Netball at the 2017 Pacific Mini Games in Port Vila, Vanuatu will be held during December 2017.

Only four teams participated after Fiji withdrew late. Papua New Guinea won the gold medal from Tonga. Solomon Islands claimed bronze over hosts Vanuatu.

== Pre-event results ==
25 November 2017	Report	Port Vila (Vanuatu)	unknown	(Vanuatu) Northern Saints	Korman Stadium, Port Vila, Vanuatu

7 December 2017	Report	Papua New Guinea	58 – 63	(Australia) Brisbane East Tigers	Morton Bay College, Brisbane, Australia

9 December 2017	Report	Papua New Guinea	58 – 41	Indigenous Australia	Hibiscus Stadium, Brisbane, Australia

== Preliminary round ==
	W	D	L	Pts	F	A	F/A
Papua New Guinea	3	0	0	9	223	135	88
Tonga	2	0	1	7	210	152	58
Solomon Islands	1	0	2	5	154	192	-38
Vanuatu	0	0	3	3	109	217	-108

13 December 2017; 5.30pm	Report	Papua New Guinea	79 – 26	Vanuatu	Korman Stadium, Port Vila, Vanuatu
13 December 2017; 5.30pm	Report	R.Andrew 25 (89%); R.Vali 19 (68%); B.Peter 19 (90%); J.Tulapi 16 (84%)		M.Nalisa 11 (61%); S.Tarilo 10 (77%); R.Saul 5 (45%)	Korman Stadium, Port Vila, Vanuatu

8pm	Report	Tonga	73 – 44	Solomon Islands	Korman Stadium, Port Vila, Vanuatu
8pm	Report	K.TongoTongo 63 (91%); L.Taulahi 8 (57); H.Latuvuki 2 (40%)		J.Basia 29 (85%); T.Kaitu'u 15 (75%)	Korman Stadium, Port Vila, Vanuatu

14 December 2017; 9am	Report	Papua New Guinea	73 – 47	Solomon Islands	Korman Stadium, Port Vila, Vanuatu
14 December 2017; 9am	Report	R.Andrew 43 (86%); J.Tulapi 17 (89%); B.Peter 13 (79%)		J.Basia 34 (83%); T.Kaitu'u 13 (81%)	Korman Stadium, Port Vila, Vanuatu

12pm	Report	Tonga	75 – 37	Vanuatu	Korman Stadium, Port Vila, Vanuatu
12pm	Report	K.TongoTongo 69 (88%); L.Taulahi 5 (56%); H.Latuvuki 1 (100%)		M.Nalisa 18 (69%); S.Tarileo 18 (82%); G.Theophile 1 (33%)	Korman Stadium, Port Vila, Vanuatu

15 December 2017; 9am	Report	Solomon Islands	63 – 46	Vanuatu	Korman Stadium, Port Vila, Vanuatu
15 December 2017; 9am	Report	J.Basia 54 (96%); T.Kaitu'u 9 (82%)		M.Nalisa 29 (81%); S.Tarileo 17 (74%)	Korman Stadium, Port Vila, Vanuatu

12pm	Report	Papua New Guinea	71 – 62	Tonga	Korman Stadium, Port Vila, Vanuatu
12pm	Report	R.Andrew 54 (76%); B.Peter 15 (79%); J.Tulapi 2 (100%)		K.TongoTongo 53 (96%); L.Taulahi 9 (82%)	Korman Stadium, Port Vila, Vanuatu

== Final standings ==
Place	Nation
Gold	Papua New Guinea
Silver	Tonga
Bronze	Solomon Islands
4	Vanuatu

== See also ==
- Netball at the Pacific Mini Games
