= Netball at the 1999 South Pacific Games =

- Location: Santa Rita, Guam
- Dates: from 29 May to 12 June 1999
- Teams: 4

Medalists
gold medal	Fiji
silver medal	Papua New Guinea
bronze medal	Vanuatu

Netball at the 1999 South Pacific Games in Santa Rita, Guam was held from 29 May to 12 June 1999.

== Results ==
=== Pool games ===
	P	W	D	L	PTS	F	A	%
Fiji	6	6	0	0	18	443	143	330.60
Papua New Guinea	6	4	0	2	14	331	203	163.05
Vanuatu	6	2	0	4	10	176	397	44.33
Norfolk Island	6	0	0	6	6	149	365	40.82

Qualified for Gold medal game
Qualified for Bronze medal game

==== Round 1 ====
Fiji	88 – 22	Vanuatu	Santa Rita, Guam

Papua New Guinea	96 – 22	Norfolk Island	Santa Rita, Guam

Fiji	96 – 12	Norfolk Island	Santa Rita, Guam

Vanuatu	27 – 76	Papua New Guinea	Santa Rita, Guam

Fiji	53 – 33	Papua New Guinea	Santa Rita, Guam

Norfolk Island	41 – 42	Vanuatu	Santa Rita, Guam

==== Round 2 ====
Fiji	90 – 16	Vanuatu	Santa Rita, Guam

Papua New Guinea	52 – 23	Norfolk Island	Santa Rita, Guam

Fiji	71 – 18	Norfolk Island	Santa Rita, Guam

Vanuatu	33 – 69	Papua New Guinea	Santa Rita, Guam

Fiji	45 – 33	Papua New Guinea	Santa Rita, Guam

Norfolk Island	33 – 36	Vanuatu	Santa Rita, Guam

=== Bronze Medal match ===
Vanuatu	41 – 36	Norfolk Island	Santa Rita, Guam

=== Gold Medal match ===
Fiji	60 – 32	Papua New Guinea	Santa Rita, Guam

== Final standings ==
Place	Nation
Gold	Fiji
Silver	Papua New Guinea
Bronze	Vanuatu
4	Norfolk Island

== See also ==
- Netball at the Pacific Games
