= Netball at the 2015 Pacific Games =

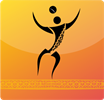
- Netball pictogram for the Games
- Venues: Sir John Guise Indoor Stadium
- Location: Port Moresby
- Dates: 13–18 July 2015
- Teams: 7

Medalists
gold medal	Fiji
silver medal	Papua New Guinea
bronze medal	Samoa

Netball at the 2015 Pacific Games in Port Moresby, Papua New Guinea was held on July 13–18, 2015.

== Preliminary round ==
=== Pool A ===
	MP	MW	ML	MC	PW	PL	PD
Fiji	2	2	0	4	169	47	+122
Cook Islands	2	1	1	2	103	89	+14
Vanuatu	2	0	2	0	35	171	−136

Qualified for the semifinals

13 July 2015	Fiji	100 – 15	Vanuatu

14 July 2015	Cook Islands	71 – 20	Vanuatu

15 July 2015	Fiji	69 – 32	Cook Islands

=== Pool B ===
	MP	MW	ML	MC	PW	PL	PD
Papua New Guinea	3	3	0	6	211	106	+105
Samoa	3	2	1	4	225	107	+118
Tonga	3	1	2	2	98	208	−110
Solomon Islands	3	0	3	0	88	201	−113

Qualified for the semifinals

13 July 2015	Samoa	88 – 21	Tonga

13 July 2015	Papua New Guinea	68 – 25	Solomon Islands

14 July 2015	Papua New Guinea	81 – 27	Tonga

14 July 2015	Samoa	83 – 24	Solomon Islands

15 July 2015	Tonga	50 – 39	Solomon Islands

15 July 2015	Papua New Guinea	62 – 54	Samoa

== Consolation matches ==
13 July 2015	Cook Islands	70 – 38	Tonga

15 July 2015	Tonga	53 – 26	Vanuatu

16 July 2015	Tonga	50 – 43	Vanuatu

16 July 2015	Solomon Islands	62 – 31	Vanuatu

== Knockout stage ==
Semi finals
17 July
Fiji	64
Samoa	48
17 July
Papua New Guinea	50
Cook Islands	48

Final
18 July
Fiji	68
Papua New Guinea	51
Bronze medal match
18 July
Samoa	54
Cook Islands	49

=== Semi-finals ===
17 July 2015	Fiji	64 – 48	Samoa

17 July 2015	Papua New Guinea	50 – 48	Cook Islands

=== Third place match ===
18 July 2015	Samoa	54 – 49	Cook Islands

=== Final ===
18 July 2015	Fiji	68 – 51	Papua New Guinea

== Final standings ==
Place	Nation
Gold	Fiji
Silver	Papua New Guinea
Bronze	Samoa
4	Cook Islands
5	Tonga
6	Vanuatu
7	Solomon Islands

== See also ==
- Netball at the Pacific Games
