= Oceania Netball =

Netball governing body

- Region: Oceania
- President: Wainikiti Bogidrau
- www.oceanianetball.com

Oceania Netball is the regional body within the World Netball that governs netball in Oceania. The current president is Wainikiti Bogidrau from Fiji. There are currently twenty four countries within the Oceania region. There are seven full members with New Zealand the only one with elite status. Realistically only thirteen nations, predominantly Commonwealth nations, play the game.

Competitions in the region include the Pacific Netball Series, Pacific Games, Pacific Mini Games and the Arafura Games.

== Members ==
Full Members

Team	Association
Cook Islands	Netball Cook Islands
Fiji	Netball Fiji
New Zealand	Netball New Zealand
Papua New Guinea	Netball PNG
Samoa	Samoa Netball Association
Solomon Islands	Solomon Islands Netball Federation
Tonga	Tonga Netball

Associate Members

Team	Association
Niue	Niue Island Netball Association
Norfolk Island	Norfolk Islands Netball Association

Other netball nations

Team	Association
American Samoa	
Kiribati	
Nauru	
Tokelau	
Tuvalu	
Vanuatu	Vanuatu Netball Association
