= Netball in Tonga =

Overview of the ball sport in Tonga

- Country: Tonga
- Governing body: Tonga Netball Association
- National team: Tonga

Netball in Tonga is a popular sport, usually played by girls on Saturdays during the winter, though games can be played at all times of the year.

== History ==
Tonga Netball Association is Tonga's governing body for netball. They are a young organisation having been established in 2012. They joined the International Netball Federation as full-time members in 2011. With the help of Netball Australia and the Australian Government's Pacific Sports Partnership program, netball in Tonga has once again made a comeback.

== International competition ==
In the 1990 Oceania Netball Tournament, Tonga competed along with countries like Australia, New Zealand, Fiji and the Cook Islands.

At Gay Games VI, a transgender netball team from Tonga competed. The 2015 Pacific Games in Papua New Guinea was Tonga's first international netball game since they became affiliates of International Netball Federation.

== Bibliography ==
- Crocombe, R G (1992). Pacific neighbours : New Zealand's relations with other Pacific Islands : Aotearoa me Nga Moutere o te Moana Nui a Kiwa. Centre for Pacific Studies, University of Canterbury : Institute of Pacific Studies, University of the South Pacific. ISBN 982-02-0078-4. OCLC 28814021.
- International Federation of Netball Associations (21 January 2011a). "Current World Rankings". Archived from the original on 19 May 2011.
- MacKinnon, Rowan (2009). South Pacific [the only guide to the entire South Pacific]. Lonely Planet. ISBN 978-1-74104-786-8. OCLC 610105853.
- Symons, Carol; Hemphill, Dennis (November 2006). "Netball and transgender participation". In Caudwell, Jayne (ed.). Sport, sexualities and queer/theory. Routledge Critical Studies in Sport. Routledge. pp. 122–124. ISBN 0-415-36761-1.
