= Netball in the Solomon Islands =

Overview of the ball sport in the Solomon Islands

- Country: Solomon Islands
- National team: Solomon Islands

National competitions
- Our Telekom InterProvincial netball competition

Netball in Solomon Islands is a popular sport, usually played by girls on Saturdays during the winter, though games can be played at all times of the year.

== National Competitions ==
The Our Telekom InterProvincial netball competition was held in December 2010. Honiara won the title, and Makira took second place. At the award ceremony, Rennell and Bellona Province won the hosting rights for Islands' 2011 U21 championships that are to be held in June 2011.

== Bibliography ==
- International Federation of Netball Associations (21 January 2011a). "Current World Rankings". Archived from the original on 19 May 2011.
- MacKinnon, Rowan (2009). South Pacific [the only guide to the entire South Pacific]. Lonely Planet. ISBN 978-1-74104-786-8. OCLC 610105853.
- International Federation of Netball Associations (10 December 2010e). "Netball Weekly Roundup". Archived from the original on 14 March 2011.
