= Cook Islands Netball Association =

Sports governing body in the Cook Islands

- Region: Oceania Netball Federation

Official website
- {{URL|example.com|optional display text}}
- (Cook Islands)

Cook Islands Netball Association is the national body which oversees, promotes and manages netball in the Cook Islands. The Cook Islands Netball Association is a member of Oceania Netball Federation.

== Clubs ==
In 1990, the Cook Islands Netball Association included about 15 clubs, all based in the southern islands group. They are Ngatangia/Matavera, Avatiu/Nikao, Arorangi, Titikaveka, Takuvaine, Tupapa, Outer Islands.

== See also ==
- Netball in the Cook Islands
- Cook Islands national netball team

== Bibliography ==
- Cook Islands Netball Association (2009). "About Us".
- Cook Islands Netball Association (2011). "Pacific Netball Series".
- Cook Islands Sports and National Olympic Committee (2011). "Cook Islands Sports and National Olympic Committee".
- Crocombe, R G (1992). Pacific neighbours : New Zealand's relations with other Pacific Islands : Aotearoa me Nga Moutere o te Moana Nui a Kiwa. Centre for Pacific Studies, University of Canterbury : Institute of Pacific Studies, University of the South Pacific. ISBN 982-02-0078-4. OCLC 28814021.
- Crocombe, R G (2007). Asia in the Pacific Islands : replacing the West. CIPS Publications, University of the South Pacific. ISBN 978-982-02-0388-4. OCLC 213886360.
- Crocombe, R G (1990). Voluntary service and development in the Cook Islands. Cook Islands Extension Centre : Institute of Pacific Studies of the University of the South Pacific. ISBN 982-02-0023-7. OCLC 28814053.
- Crocombe, R G; Crocombe, M T (1997). "The Cook Islands in Review: Issues and Events, 1 July 1995 to 30 June 1996". 9 (1).
