= Tokelau national netball team =

Tokelau
- Confederation: Oceania Netball Federation
Team colours

Netball World Cup
- Appearances: none

Commonwealth Games
- Appearances: none

The Tokelau national netball team represents Tokelau in international netball. The team broke up in 2009, but reunited in 2019.

== Competitive record ==
Pacific Games
Year	Games	Event	Location	Placing
2007	XIII Games	Netball	Apia, Samoa	5th

Pacific Mini Games
Year	Games	Event	Location	Placing
2009	VIII Games	Netball	Rarotonga, Cook Islands	4th
