= Vanuatu national netball team =

- Nickname(s): Lava
- Association: Vanuatu Netball Association
- Confederation: Oceania Netball Federation
- Head coach: Beverly Ligo
- Asst coach: Sarah Murfett
Team colours

The Vanuatu national netball team is the national netball team of Vanuatu. The current Vanuatu Lava members are below.

The Vanuatu Netball Association was formed in November, 1986 in Port Vila. The team colours are red and yellow.

== Current squad ==
Vanuatu Team at the 2015 Pacific Games:

- Nelline Buetari
- Lilian Willie
- Roselyne Willy
- Royline Charlie
- Aileen Huri
- Vanessa Laloyer
- Pauline Malanga
- Monua Nalisa
- Kathy Sogari
- Stephany Tarileo
- Charlotte Temakon

=== Previous Teams ===
2012 Pacific Netball Series Team
Players	Coaching staff
Aileen Huri; Anastashia Sope; Anna Vira; Bekina Ken; Brenda Mala; Cassandra Bebe; Charlotte Temakon; Clemency Bebe; Druscilla Gwero; Ediza Ngwele; Florida Tari; Gretal Saul; Gwendolyn Liu; Harina Tamata; Ladonna Tabilepo; Lillian Willie; Lucienne Toa; Lynn Hava; Natasha Boe; Nellyn Tari; Ngolina Tavoa; Setaita Lopo Tarosa; Stephanie Sandy; Stephany Tarileo; Taniki Tulangi; Tracey George; Vanessa Quai; Vasemaca Malverus; Viran Molisa	Head coach: Beverly Ligo; Asst coach: Sarah Murfett

== Competitive history ==
World Netball Championships
Year	Championship	Location	Placing
1991	8th World Championships	Sydney, Australia	20th
1995	9th World Championships	Birmingham, England	DNC
1999	10th World Championships	Christchurch, New Zealand	16th

Pacific Games
Year	Games	Event	Location	Placing
1999	XI Games	Netball	Santa Rita, Guam	3rd
2003	XII Games	Netball	Suva, Fiji	6th
2007	XIII Games	Netball	Apia, Samoa	8th
2015	XV Games	Netball	Port Moresby, Papua New Guinea	6th
2023	XVII Games	Netball	Honiara, Solomon Islands	9th

Pacific Mini Games
Year	Games	Event	Location	Placing
1993	IV Games	Netball	Port Vila, Vanuatu	7th
2001	VI Games	Netball	Kingston, Norfolk Island	7th
2017	X Games	Netball	Port Vila, Vanuatu	4th
