= Netball in the Americas =

- Governing body: Americas Netball; Caribbean Netball Association
- First played: 1900s

International competitions
- AFNA Championships; Netball World Cup Qualifiers; ECCB International Netball Series

Netball in the Americas is organised by Americas Netball. Netball is most popular among the Commonwealth nations in the Caribbean where the Caribbean Netball Association also take a leading role in organising competitions. Fourteen teams from the Americas have competed at the World Netball Championships and/or Netball World Cup. Jamaica have competed at every tournament since the inaugural 1963 edition. Jamaica are regularly ranked in the top four in the World Netball Rankings. Trinidad and Tobago are the only team other than Australia and New Zealand to have won a Netball World Cup. National teams from the Americas also compete in tournaments such as the AFNA Championships, Netball World Cup Qualifiers and the ECCB International Netball Series

== Early years ==
Netball was first introduced to Jamaica around 1909 during the British colonial era. It was brought to Jamaica by English women who came to teach in girls' secondary schools, most notably at Wolmer's Girls' School. From Jamaica, it quickly spread around the British West Indies, primarily by British missionaries and educators. Initially played in schools and churches, netball quickly gained popularity among young women. Over time, netball evolved from a recreational activity to a competitive sport, with organized leagues and tournaments emerging across the region. In the mid-20th century, netball began to flourish in the Caribbean, with national associations established in countries such as Jamaica, Trinidad and Tobago, Barbados, and Saint Lucia.

== Governing bodies ==
=== Americas Netball ===
Americas Netball is the main governing body for netball in the Americas. It is affiliated to World Netball.

=== Caribbean Netball Association ===
The Caribbean Netball Association is the main governing body for netball in the Caribbean. It is affiliated to World Netball and Americas Netball. It is responsible for organising and administering the ECCB International Netball Series and the Jean Pierre Caribbean Youth Netball Tournament.

== Competitions ==
=== Early tournaments ===
In 1952, Lystra Lewis, the pioneering netball coach and administrator, first coached the Trinidad and Tobago national netball team. Competitive netball among Caribbean/West Indies countries started in 1954 with a triangular tournament featuring Trinidad and Tobago, Saint Vincent and the Grenadines and Grenada. In 1954, Lewis was instrumental in establishing the West Indies Netball Board in an effort to formalise these netball tournaments. In 1956, the original three were joined by Barbados. In 1959 they were joined by Jamaica. Jamaica made their Test debut at the 1959 West Indies tournament.

=== Current tournaments ===
Americas Netball has organised two major series – the AFNA Championships and Netball World Cup Qualifiers.

The Caribbean Netball Association organises two major annual tournaments. These are the ECCB International Netball Series and the Jean Pierre Caribbean Youth Netball Tournament. The latter tournament is named after Jean Pierre, the former Trinidad and Tobago netball international and politician. The inaugural tournament was played in 1998 and was hosted by Antigua and Barbuda and won by Jamaica. It has been held almost annually ever since. Sixteen countries from across the Caribbean are eligible to participate. In 2025 it is celebrated its 21st edition. In 2023, netball made its debut at the Central American and Caribbean Games.

| Years | Competition |
|---|---|
| 1994–2018 | AFNA Championships |
| 2007– | Netball World Cup Qualifiers |
| 2019– | ECCB International Netball Series |
| 2023– | Central American and Caribbean Games |
| 1998– | Jean Pierre Caribbean Youth Netball Tournament |

=== Tournaments hosted ===
In addition to hosting their own tournaments, the Americas have also hosted the following major tournaments.

| Tournaments | Host |
|---|---|
| 1971 World Netball Tournament | Jamaica |
| 1979 World Netball Tournament | Trinidad and Tobago |
| 2003 World Netball Championships | Jamaica |
| 2005 World Youth Netball Championships | United States |
| 2016 World University Netball Championship | United States |
| Fast5 Netball at the 2023 Commonwealth Youth Games | Trinidad and Tobago |

== National teams ==
=== World Netball Rankings ===
Between 2008 and 2018, Jamaica were regularly ranked number four in the World Netball Rankings. However, in July 2019, they were ranked number two for the first time. During the early 2020s they have regularly challenged England for the number three position. Trinidad and Tobago are the next highest ranked Americas team. In 2008, Saint Vincent and the Grenadines were featured in the initial World Netball Rankings, listed 12th. They are the highest-ranked team in the Eastern Caribbean and they regularly compete with Barbados for third place in the region.

=== Netball World Cup participants ===
Fourteen teams from the Americas have competed at the World Netball Championships and/or Netball World Cup. Jamaica have competed at every tournament since the inaugural 1963 edition. They have been bronze medalists on four occasions – 1991, 2003, 2007 and 2023. Jamaica have also hosted the 1971 World Netball Tournament and the 2003 World Netball Championships.

Trinidad and Tobago played in the inaugural 1963 World Netball Tournament. Led by coach and pioneer Lystra Lewis, the team finished fourth. With the exception of the 1991 tournament, they have competed in every World Netball Championships and/or Netball World Cup since. Trinidad and Tobago are the only team other than Australia and New Zealand to have won a Netball World Cup. Trinidad and Tobago hosted the 1979 World Netball Tournament in Port of Spain. With a team coached by Lystra Lewis, captained by Sherril Peters and featuring Jean Pierre, Trinidad and Tobago won eight of their nine matches in the round-robin stage. This included a 40–38 win over Australia. However, both Australia and New Zealand also won eight of their nine matches. There were no playoffs to determine an outright winner and the tournament organisers declared all three teams champions. The Trinidad and Tobago Netball Association was subsequently awarded the Hummingbird Medal and the individual members of the team were also awarded the Chaconia Medal. Trinidad and Tobago were bronze medallists at the 1983 World Netball Tournament and shared the silver medal at the 1987 World Netball Tournament.

| Team | (England) 1963 | (Australia) 1967 | (Jamaica) 1971 | (New Zealand) 1975 | (Trinidad and Tobago) 1979 | (Singapore) 1983 | (Scotland) 1987 | (Australia) 1991 | (England) 1995 | (New Zealand) 1999 | (Jamaica) 2003 | (New Zealand) 2007 | (Singapore) 2011 | (Australia) 2015 | (England) 2019 | (South Africa) 2023 | Total |
|---|---|---|---|---|---|---|---|---|---|---|---|---|---|---|---|---|---|
| Antigua and Barbuda | - | - | - | - | 12th | 9th | - | - | 12th | - | 17th | - | - | - | - | - | 4 |
| Bahamas | - | - | 9th | - | 18th | - | - | - | - | - | - | - | - | - | - | - | 2 |
| Barbados | - | - | - | - | 6th | - | =6th | - | 11th | 10th | 7th | 13th | 11th | 13th | 12th | 14th | 10 |
| Bermuda | - | - | - | - | 19th | - | =10th | - | 23rd | - | 22nd | - | - | - | - | - | 4 |
| Canada | - | - | - | - | 11th | 12th | =10th | 6th | 13th | 13th | 21st | - | - | - | - | - | 7 |
| Cayman Islands | - | - | - | - | - | - | - | 16th | 21st | 23rd | 24th | - | - | - | - | - | 4 |
| Grenada | - | - | - | - | 15th | - | - | - | - | - | 20th | - | - | - | - | - | 2 |
| Jamaica | 5th | 6th | =4th | 5th | 5th | 5th | 5th | 3rd | 5th | 4th | 3rd | 3rd | 4th | 4th | 5th | 3rd | 16 |
| Saint Kitts and Nevis | - | - | - | - | =6th | | - | - | - | - | - | - | - | - | - | - | 1 |
| Saint Lucia | - | - | - | - | =12th | - | - | - | - | - | 16th | - | - | - | - | - | 2 |
| Saint Vincent and the Grenadines | - | - | - | - | 16th | - | - | - | 10th | - | 13th | - | - | - | - | - | 3 |
| Trinidad and Tobago | 4th | 5th | =4th | 4th | =1st | 3rd | =2nd | - | 6th | 8th | 10th | 11th | 7th | 9th | 9th | 12th | 15 |
| United States | - | - | - | - | - | - | - | - | 14th | 15th | 9th | - | - | - | - | - | 3 |
| West Indies | 7th | - | - | - | - | - | - | - | - | - | - | - | - | - | - | - | 1 |

=== Americas Netball members ===
Americas Netball currently has 18 full members and two associate members.

Full Members

| Team | Association |
|---|---|
| Anguilla | |
| Antigua and Barbuda | Antigua and Barbuda Netball Association |
| Argentina | Netball Argentina |
| Barbados | Barbados Netball Association |
| British Virgin Islands | Netball BVI |
| Bermuda | Netball Bermuda |
| Canada | Netball Canada |
| Cayman Islands | Cayman Islands Netball |
| Dominica | Dominica Netball Association |
| Grenada | Grenada Netball Association |
| Guadeloupe | Guadeloupe Netball Association |
| Jamaica | Netball Jamaica |
| Saint Kitts and Nevis | Saint Kitts and Nevis Netball Association |
| Saint Lucia | Netball St Lucia |
| Saint Vincent and the Grenadines | Saint Vincent and the Grenadines Netball Association |
| Sint Eustatius | St Eustatius Netball Association |
| Sint Maarten | St Maarten Netball Association |
| Trinidad and Tobago | Trinidad and Tobago Netball Association |
| United States | USA Netball |

Associate Members

| Team | Association |
|---|---|
| Dominican Republic | Netball Republica Dominicana |
| Venezuela | Federación Venezolana Netball |

Other netball nations

| Team | Association |
|---|---|
| Aruba | |
| Bahamas | Bahamas Netball Federation |
| Bonaire | |
| Chile | |
| Cuba | |
| Curaçao | |
| Guyana | |
| Haiti | |
| Montserrat | |
| Paraguay | |
| Peru | |
| (Saba (island)) Saba | |
| (Turks and Caicos Islands) Turks and Caicos | |
| Uruguay | |
| (United States Virgin Islands) US Virgin Islands | |
