= 2023 Netball World Cup Regional Qualifier – Americas =

International netball series hosted by Jamaica

Tournament details
- Host country: Jamaica
- City: Kingston
- Venue: National Indoor Sports Centre
- Dates: 16–21 October 2022
- Teams: 9
- TV partner: SportsMax TV/Netball Pass

Final positions
- Champions: Jamaica (1st title)
- Runners-up: Trinidad and Tobago
- Third place: Barbados

Tournament statistics
- Matches played: 36

The 2023 Netball World Cup Regional Qualifier – Americas was a tournament organised by Americas Netball. It featured nine teams playing a series of netball test matches in October 2022 at Kingston's National Indoor Sports Centre. The tournament served as an Americas qualifier for the 2023 Netball World Cup. With a team captained by Jhaniele Fowler and coached by Connie Francis, the hosts, Jamaica, won the series. Jamaica had already qualified for the World Cup via the World Netball Rankings. The second and third placed teams, Trinidad and Tobago and Barbados, qualified via this series. Half of the matches were live-streamed. Throughout much of the Americas region, including all competing countries except the United States, the matches were shown on SportsMax TV. For everyone else, the games were on Netball Pass.

== Teams, head coaches and captains ==
Team	Head coach	Captain
Antigua and Barbuda	Lisa Smith	Amey Lake
Barbados	Margaret Cutting	Latonia Blackman; Shonette Azore-Bruce
Cayman Islands	Lyneth Monteith	Aryana Grant
Grenada		
Jamaica	Connie Francis	Jhaniele Fowler
Saint Lucia	Minneth Reynolds	
Saint Vincent and the Grenadines	Godfrey Harry	Ruthann Williams
Trinidad and Tobago	Kemba Duncan	Shaquanda Green-Noel
United States	Greyson-Superville	Shaina Wilson

== Match officials ==
Umpires

Umpire	Association
Wayne Benti	Saint Lucia
Joel Brown	Trinidad and Tobago
Makeba Clarke	Barbados
O'Neil Cockburn	Trinidad and Tobago
Tracy-Ann Griffiths	Jamaica
Moeth Gaymes	St Vincent and the Grenadines
Lilia Mathurin-Cameron	Trinidad and Tobago
Michelle Maynard	Barbados
Kanika Paul-Payne	Trinidad and Tobago
Terrence Peart	Jamaica
Joel Young-Strong	Trinidad and Tobago

== Matches ==
=== Day 1 ===
Sunday, 16 October 2022	Barbados	62–27	Cayman Islands
9.15

Sunday, 16 October 2022	Trinidad and Tobago	55–24	Antigua and Barbuda
9.25

Sunday, 16 October 2022	Saint Vincent and the Grenadines	51–24	United States
11.15		Report

Sunday, 16 October 2022	Grenada	53–45	Saint Lucia
11.25

Sunday, 16 October 2022	Trinidad and Tobago	63–25	Saint Lucia
18.15

Sunday, 16 October 2022	Grenada	50–40	Cayman Islands
18.25

Sunday, 16 October 2022	Jamaica	74–35	Saint Vincent and the Grenadines
20.15		Report

Sunday, 16 October 2022	United States	34–22	Antigua and Barbuda
20.25

=== Day 2 ===
Monday, 17 October 2022	Grenada	62–29	Antigua and Barbuda
18.15

Monday, 17 October 2022	Trinidad and Tobago	49–42	Saint Vincent and the Grenadines
18.25	Afeisha Noel 32/37 (86%); Joelisa Cooper 17/19 (89%)		Mary Ann Frederick 42/48 (88%)

Monday, 17 October 2022	Jamaica	70–16	United States
20.15	Amanda Pinkey 22/24 (92%); Gezelle Allison 23; Jhaniele Fowler 13; Kelsey Jonas 12	Report

Monday, 17 October 2022	Barbados	58–26	Saint Lucia
20.25

=== Day 3 ===
Tuesday, 18 October 2022	Trinidad and Tobago	66–42	Grenada
18.15

Tuesday, 18 October 2022	Jamaica	81–27	Cayman Islands
18.25

Tuesday, 18 October 2022	Barbados	47–26	United States
20.15

Tuesday, 18 October 2022	Saint Vincent and the Grenadines	49–36	Saint Lucia
20.25

=== Day 4 ===
Wednesday, 19 October 2022	Jamaica	80–23	Antigua and Barbuda
9.15	Amanda Pinkey 45/53 (85%); Mischa Creary 23/28 (82%); Kelsey Jonas 12/16 (75%)	Report

Wednesday, 19 October 2022	Barbados	60–38	Grenada
9.25

Wednesday, 19 October 2022	Trinidad and Tobago	60–21	Cayman Islands
11.15

Wednesday, 19 October 2022	United States	46–36	Saint Lucia
11.25

Wednesday, 19 October 2022	Barbados	57–36	Saint Vincent and the Grenadines
18.15

Wednesday, 19 October 2022	Jamaica	74–48	Grenada
18.25	Jhaniele Fowler 50/53 (94%); Amanda Pinkey 10/13 (77%) ?? 14		Lotiysha Cato 44/51 (86%) ?? 4

Wednesday, 19 October 2022	Trinidad and Tobago	43–27	United States
20.15	Joelisa Cooper 20/24 (83%); Afeisha Noel 15/16 (94%) ?? 8	Report

Wednesday, 19 October 2022	Cayman Islands	47–42	Antigua and Barbuda
20.25

=== Day 5 ===
Thursday, 20 October 2022	Jamaica	85–30	Saint Lucia
18:15

Thursday, 20 October 2022	Saint Vincent and the Grenadines	66–30	Antigua and Barbuda
18:25		Report

Thursday, 20 October 2022	Trinidad and Tobago	50–40	Barbados
20:15	Afeisha Noel 32/34 (94%); Joelisa Cooper 18/21 (86%)	Report

Thursday, 20 October 2022	United States	44–35	Cayman Islands
20:25

=== Day 6 ===
Friday, 21 October 2022	Saint Lucia	54–32	Antigua and Barbuda
18.15

Friday, 21 October 2022	Grenada	58–36	United States
18.25

Friday, 21 October 2022	Jamaica	75–37	Barbados
20.15

Friday, 21 October 2022	Saint Vincent and the Grenadines	69–45	Cayman Islands
20.25

=== Day 7 ===
Saturday, 22 October 2022	Saint Vincent and the Grenadines	69–50	Grenada
15.15

Saturday, 22 October 2022	Saint Lucia	37–33	Cayman Islands
15.25

Saturday, 22 October 2022	Jamaica	60–47	Trinidad and Tobago
17.15

Saturday, 22 October 2022	Barbados	68–29	Antigua and Barbuda
17.25

== Final table ==
Pos	Team	P	W	D	L	GF	GA	GD	Pts
1	Jamaica	8	8	0	0	608	263	+345	16
2	Trinidad and Tobago	8	7	0	1	433	290	+153	14
3	Barbados	8	6	0	2	429	307	+122	12
4	Saint Vincent and the Grenadines	8	5	0	3	417	365	+52	10
5	Grenada	8	4	0	4	401	419	-18	8
6	United States	8	3	0	5	253	362	-109	6
7	Saint Lucia	8	2	0	6	289	419	-130	4
8	Cayman Islands	8	1	0	7	275	445	-170	2
9	Antigua and Barbuda	8	0	0	8	231	466	-235	0

Qualified for the 2023 Netball World Cup via the World Netball Rankings
Qualified for the 2023 Netball World Cup via this series

== Top three squads ==
Winners	Runners Up	Third
Jamaica; Coach: Connie Francis	Trinidad and Tobago; Coach: Kemba Duncan	Barbados; Coach: Margaret Cutting
Gezelle Allison; Theresa Beckford; Mischa Creary; Jhaniele Fowler (c); Kelsey Jonas; Tafiya Hunter; Amanda Pinkney; Crystal Plummer; Tahlice Redwood; Kimone Shaw; Abigail Sutherland; Quannia Walker	Janeisha Cassimy; Joelisa Cooper; Tianna Dillon; Cheynelle Dolland; Oprah Douglas; Shaquanda Greene-Noel (c); Faith Hagley; Jameela McCarthy; Jeresia McEachrane; Shaniya Morgan; Afeisha Noel; Shantel Seemungal	Shonette Azore-Bruce (cc); Latonia Blackman (cc); Samantha Browne; Damisha Croney; Brianna Holder; Teresa Howell; Tonisha Rock-Yaw; Faye Sealy; Sabreena Smith; Akeena Stoute; Tamara Trotman; Shonica Wharton
