= Caribbean Netball Association =

Netball governing body

- Sport: Netball
- Jurisdiction: Caribbean
- Membership: 16 national associations
- Abbreviation: CNA
- Founded: 1974
- Affiliation: World Netball; Americas Netball
- Location: 80 Riversdale Drive; Aberdeen Park; Edinburgh Gardens; Chaguanas; Trinidad and Tobago

Official website
- netballcaribbean.org

The Caribbean Netball Association is the main governing body for netball in the Caribbean. It is affiliated to World Netball and Americas Netball. It is responsible for organising and administering the ECCB International Netball Series and the Jean Pierre Caribbean Youth Netball Tournament.

== History ==
=== Foundation ===
In 1974, the Trinidad and Tobago pioneer and administrator, Lystra Lewis played a leading role in establishing the Caribbean Netball Association. The CNA remains headquartered in Trinidad and Tobago.

== Competitions ==
The Caribbean Netball Association organises two major annual tournaments. These are the ECCB International Netball Series and the Jean Pierre Caribbean Youth Netball Tournament. The latter tournament is named after Jean Pierre, the former Trinidad and Tobago netball international and politician. The inaugural tournament was played in 1998 and was hosted by Antigua and Barbuda and won by Jamaica. It has been held almost annually ever since. Sixteen countries from across the Caribbean are eligible to participate. In 2025 it is celebrated its 21st edition.

=== Current ===
Years	Competition
2019–	ECCB International Netball Series
1998–	Jean Pierre Caribbean Youth Netball Tournament

=== Former ===
Years	Competition
1977–1993	Caribbean Netball Championships
1991–2018	ECCB Under-23 Netball Tournament

== Members ==
=== Full Members ===
Team	Association
Anguilla	
Antigua and Barbuda	Antigua and Barbuda Netball Association
Bahamas	Bahamas Netball Federation
Barbados	Barbados Netball Association
Bermuda	Netball Bermuda
Cayman Islands	Cayman Islands Netball Association
Dominica	
Grenada	Netball Grenada
Guyana	
Jamaica	Netball Jamaica
Montserrat	
Saint Kitts and Nevis	Saint Kitts and Nevis Netball Association
Saint Lucia	Netball Saint Lucia
Saint Vincent and the Grenadines	Saint Vincent and the Grenadines Netball Association
Sint Eustatius	
Trinidad and Tobago	Trinidad and Tobago Netball Association

=== ECCB International Netball Series participants ===
Team	(Saint Vincent and the Grenadines) 2019	(Dominica) 2022	(Antigua and Barbuda) 2023	(Saint Lucia) 2024	(Grenada) 2025
Anguilla	-	-	-	7th	6th
Antigua and Barbuda	4th	3rd	3rd	4th	4th
Barbados	-	^{1}	^{1}	-	^{1}
Cayman Islands	-	-	^{2}	^{2}	^{2}
Dominica	5th	4th	4th	5th	5th
Grenada	1st	-	1st	2nd	2nd
Guyana	-	-	-	-	^{3}
Montserrat	-	-	-	6th	7th
Saint Kitts and Nevis	-	5th	5th	-	-
Saint Lucia	3rd	2nd	6th	3rd	3rd
Saint Vincent and the Grenadines	2nd	1st	2nd	1st	1st

Notes

- ^1 Barbados were a guest team
- ^2 Cayman Islands were a guest team
- ^3 Guyana were a guest team
