= Netball in Jamaica =

- Country: Jamaica
- Governing body: Netball Jamaica
- National team: Jamaica
- First played: 1909

Netball in Jamaica is organised by Netball Jamaica. The Jamaica national netball team regularly competes in international netball competitions such as the Netball World Cup and the Netball at the Commonwealth Games. The Netball Jamaica Elite League is the top level netball league featuring teams from Jamaica.

== Early years ==
Netball was first introduced to Jamaica around 1909 during the British colonial era. It was brought to Jamaica by English women who came to teach in girls' secondary schools, most notably at Wolmer's Girls' School. During the 1920s, the Young Women's Christian Association, played a leading role in promoting netball throughout Jamaica. By the 1930's seven teams from the Kingston and St. Andrew's Corporate Area, including teams representing the Wolmer's Old Girls Association, Excelsior High School, St Andrew High School and St Hugh's High School, were competing in the ISSA Cup. In 1935, the YWCA's advocacy resulted in the creation of Jamaica's first competitive league — the Kingston and St Andrew Net Ball League.

== Governing body ==
Netball Jamaica is the main governing body for netball in Jamaica. It is affiliated to World Netball, Americas Netball, the Caribbean Netball Association and the Jamaica Olympic Association. It is responsible for organising and administering the Jamaica national netball team and the Netball Jamaica Elite League. It was originally formed in 1958 as the Jamaica Netball Association by Pancho Rankine, Margaret Beckford and Margarietta St. Juste. In 1959 it became a member of the West Indies Netball Board and an associate member of the All England Netball Association. It was subsequently invited to send a team to the West Indies Netball Championship in Montserrat in August 1959. Jamaica made their Test debut at this tournament. In 2013, the JNA was rebranded as Netball Jamaica.

== National team ==
The Jamaica national netball team, commonly known as the Sunshine Girls, represent Netball Jamaica in international netball tournaments such as the Netball World Cup, Netball at the Commonwealth Games, the Taini Jamison Trophy and the Fast5 Netball World Series. They have also represented Jamaica at the World Games. At the 2022 Commonwealth Games, with a team coached by Connie Francis and captained by Jhaniele Fowler, Jamaica finished as silver medallists. They were bronze medallists in 2002, 2014 and 2018. Jamaica has competed in every World Netball Championships/Netball World Cup. They were also bronze medallists at the 1991, 2003, 2007 and 2023 Netball World Cups. Jamaica also won the 2018 Taini Jamison Trophy Series. Between 2008 and 2018, Jamaica were regularly ranked number four in the World Netball Rankings. However, in July 2019, they were ranked number two for the first time. During the early 2020s they have regularly challenged England for the number three position.

Debut	Tournament	Best result
1963	Netball World Cup	3rd (1991, 2003, 2007, 2023)
1998	Netball at the Commonwealth Games	2nd (2022)
1985	Netball at the World Games	3rd (1985, 1993)
2009	Fast5 Netball World Series	2nd (2009, 2017, 2018)
1959	AFNA Championships	1st (11 titles)
2023	Netball World Cup Qualifiers	1st (2023)
2023	Central American and Caribbean Games	1st (2023)
2010	Taini Jamison Trophy	1st (2018)

== International tournaments ==
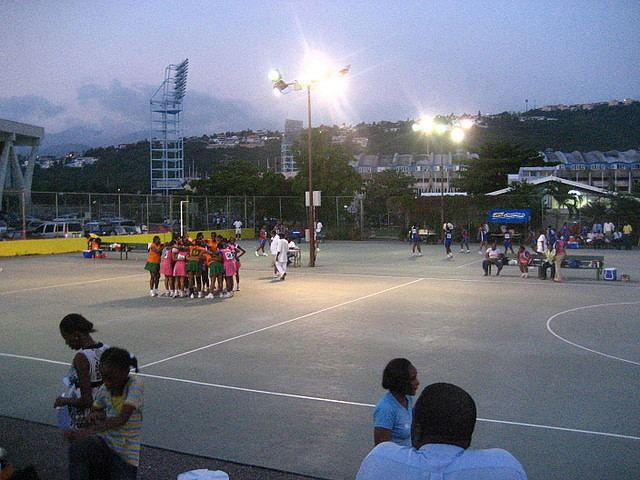
Netball being played in Jamaica.

Jamaica has hosted the following international tournaments.

Tournaments
1971 World Netball Tournament
2003 World Netball Championships
2023 Netball World Cup Regional Qualifier – Americas

== Venues ==
Netball Jamaica Elite League matches are hosted at the Leila Robinson Netball Courts and the National Indoor Sports Centre, both located within the National Stadium complex. The NISC is often used for indoor matches, while the Leila Robinson Netball Courts are used for outdoor games.

== Leagues ==
=== Netball Jamaica Elite League ===
The Netball Jamaica Elite League is the top level netball league featuring teams from Jamaica. It was formed in 2013 and is organised by Netball Jamaica. The league features teams representing the parishes of Jamaica. Between 2013 and 2019, due to sponsorship and naming rights arrangements, the league was known as the Berger Elite League. In 2014, Kingston Hummingbirds were the inaugural winners. Kingston Hummingbirds and Manchester Spurs are the league's most successful teams.
