= 2025 ECCB International Netball Series =

International netball series hosted by Grenada

Tournament details
- Host country: Grenada
- City: St. George's
- Venue: Tanteen Netball Facility
- Dates: 23–31 August 2025
- Teams: 10
- TV partner: YouTube

Final positions
- Champions: Saint Vincent and the Grenadines (3rd title)
- Runners-up: Grenada
- Third place: Saint Lucia

Tournament statistics
- Matches played: 41
- Top scorer(s): Mary-Ann Frederick; Saint Vincent and the Grenadines; 429/466 (92%)

The 2025 ECCB International Netball Series, also known as the 2025 OECS International Netball Series, was the fifth ECCB International Netball Series. It was organised by the Caribbean Netball Association. Ten national netball teams, including the hosts Grenada, played a series of netball test matches in August 2025 at St. George's Tanteen Netball Facility. Saint Vincent and the Grenadines won the series, remaining undefeated in eight out of nine matches and retaining the Gloria Ballantyne Championship Trophy for the second consecutive year. Saint Vincent and the Grenadines' Mary-Ann Frederick was named MVP of the Tournament. She also finished the series as the top scorer. The series was streamed live on the ECCB's YouTube channel.

== Teams, head coaches and captains ==
Seven teams from Eastern Caribbean Central Bank member countries — Anguilla, Antigua and Barbuda, the Commonwealth of Dominica, Grenada, Montserrat, Saint Lucia and Saint Vincent and the Grenadines — competed for the Gloria Ballantyne Championship Trophy. The series also featured three guest teams, Barbados, Cayman Islands and Guyana who competed for World Netball Rankings points. Guyana were making their series debut.

Team	Head coach	Captain
Anguilla		
Antigua and Barbuda	Jamila Fitz	Tanya Green
Barbados	Teresa Howell ?	Damisha Croney
Cayman Islands	Lyneth Monteith	Katherine Gow
Dominica		
Grenada		
Guyana	Ruddy Sampson	Tasnica Lovell
Montserrat		
Saint Lucia	Shem Maxwell	Melika Destang; Jermia Martial
Saint Vincent and the Grenadines	Natasha Baptiste	Shellisa Davis; Mary-Ann Frederick

== Milestones ==
- On 27 August 2025, Latonia Blackman made her 200th senior appearance for Barbados in the match against Saint Vincent and the Grenadines.

== Match officials ==
Umpires

Umpire	Association
Sheldon Bent	Jamaica
Dave Brown	Jamaica
Joel Brown	Trinidad and Tobago
Latricia Busby	Bermuda
Makeba Clarke	Grenada
O'Neil Cockburn	Trinidad and Tobago
Moeth Gaymes	St Vincent and the Grenadines
Tracey-Ann Griffiths	Jamaica
Terrence Peart	Jamaica
Rachael Radford	England

Umpire Appointments Panel

Umpire	Association
Chris Campbell	Jamaica
Anne Marie Dickson-Lewis	Trinidad and Tobago
Deborah Lynch	Barbados
Joel Young-Strong	Trinidad and Tobago

== Matches ==
Heavy rain disrupted the series' original schedule. At various intervals on the opening day, rain drenched the open-court facility, leaving puddles and requiring extensive mop-up operations. This resulted in the final Round 1 match been postponed. All the original Round 2 and Round 7 matches were also postponed. Not all these were successfully rescheduled. The original schedule featured 45 matches, however only 41 were eventually completed.

=== Round 1 ===
Saturday, 23 August 2025	Grenada	65–43	Dominica
16:00	Lottysha Cato 56

Saturday, 23 August 2025	Antigua and Barbuda	63–17	Anguilla
16:00	Rayana Regis 45/55 (82%); Erverdine Parker-Barnarde 18

Saturday, 23 August 2025	Saint Vincent and the Grenadines	93–16	Guyana
18:00	Mary-Ann Frederick 45/51 (88%); Annicia Dallaway 26/31 (84%); Kristiana Christopher 21/26 (81%)		Shenne Subrattie 11/14 (79%); Kristy Roberts 5/10 (50%)

Saturday, 23 August 2025	Saint Lucia	38–5	Montserrat
18:00

Saturday, 23 August 2025	Barbados	v	Cayman Islands
18:00

=== Round 2 ===
Sunday, 24 August 2025	Antigua and Barbuda	v	Guyana
15:00

Sunday, 24 August 2025	Cayman Islands	v	Dominica
17:00

Sunday, 24 August 2025	Saint Vincent and the Grenadines	v	Montserrat
17:00

Sunday, 24 August 2025	Saint Lucia	v	Barbados
19:00

Sunday, 24 August 2025	Grenada	v	Anguilla
19:00

=== Round 3 ===
Monday, 25 August 2025	Anguilla	42–21	Guyana
15:00

Monday, 25 August 2025	Antigua and Barbuda	53–14	Montserrat
17:00

Monday, 25 August 2025	Saint Lucia	53–47	Dominica
17:00

Monday, 25 August 2025	Saint Vincent and the Grenadines	55–43	Cayman Islands
19:00	Mary-Ann Frederick 44/59 (75%) ? Kristiana Christopher 11/17 (65%)		Kay Copeland 28/39 (72%); Meleshia Josephs 9/15 (60%); Sashana Richards 4/4 (100%); Rose Wilson 2/2 (100%)

Monday, 25 August 2025	Grenada	60–68	Barbados
19:00

=== Round 4 ===
Tuesday, 26 August 2025	Antigua and Barbuda	50–10	Guyana
06:30

Tuesday, 26 August 2025	Saint Vincent and the Grenadines	92–10	Montserrat
08:10

Tuesday, 26 August 2025	Grenada	69–16	Guyana
15:00

Tuesday, 26 August 2025	Cayman Islands	71–10	Montserrat
17:00

Tuesday, 26 August 2025	Barbados	65–27	Anguilla
17:00

Tuesday, 26 August 2025	Saint Lucia	45–33	Antigua and Barbuda
19:00		Report

Tuesday, 26 August 2025	Saint Vincent and the Grenadines	57–40	Dominica
19:00	Mary-Ann Frederick 46/49 (94%); Kristiana Christopher 11/13 (85%)	Report	Galeine Gordon-Seraphine 25/30 (83%); Shernel St Rose 8/13 (62%); Kenya John 7/7 (100%)

=== Round 5 ===
Wednesday, 27 August 2025	Grenada	53–16	Anguilla
06:30

Wednesday, 27 August 2025	Cayman Islands	78–16	Guyana
06:30

Wednesday, 27 August 2025	Saint Lucia	70–21	Anguilla
17:00

Wednesday, 27 August 2025	Dominica	62–20	Montserrat
17:00

Wednesday, 27 August 2025	Saint Vincent and the Grenadines	63–53	Barbados
19:00	Mary-Ann Frederick 55/56 (98%); Shellisa Davis 5/7 (71%); Kristiana Christopher 3/7 (43%)	Report	Latonia Blackman 24/24 (100%); Faye Agard 18/20 (90%); Brianna Holder 8/12 (67%); Damia Walround 3/4 (75%)

Wednesday, 27 August 2025	Grenada	63–36	Antigua and Barbuda
19:00		Report

=== Round 6 ===
Thursday, 28 August 2025	Cayman Islands	58–43	Dominica
06:30

Thursday, 28 August 2025	Montserrat	37–34	Guyana
06:30

Thursday, 28 August 2025	Barbados	94–16	Guyana
15:00

Thursday, 28 August 2025	Anguilla	40–26	Montserrat
17:00

Thursday, 28 August 2025	Saint Vincent and the Grenadines	57–43	Saint Lucia
17:00	Mary-Ann Frederick 51/54 (94%); Kristiana Christopher 6/10 (60%)		Merlika Destang 25/30 (83%); Shem Maxwell 18/22 (82%)

Thursday, 28 August 2025	Antigua and Barbuda	60–38	Dominica
19:00

Thursday, 28 August 2025	Grenada	46–58	Cayman Islands
19:00

=== Round 7 ===
Friday, 29 August 2025	Saint Lucia	v	Guyana
15:00

Friday, 29 August 2025	Saint Vincent and the Grenadines	v	Anguilla
17:00

Friday, 29 August 2025	Barbados	v	Dominica
17:00

Friday, 29 August 2025	Cayman Islands	v	Antigua and Barbuda
19:00

Friday, 29 August 2025	Grenada	v	Montserrat
19:00

=== Round 8 ===
Saturday, 30 August 2025	Barbados	61–56	Cayman Islands
06:30

Saturday, 30 August 2025	Saint Vincent and the Grenadines	74–19	Anguilla
06:30	Mary-Ann Frederick 35/36 (97%); Shanique Deshong 22/27 (81%); Kristiana Christopher 10/12 (83%); Shellisa Davis 5/7 (71%); Annicia Dallaway 2/6 (33%)		Adanna Samuel-Richardson 10/15 (67%); Lakisha Hughes 6/9 (67%); Jade Laurent 3/8 (38%)

Saturday, 30 August 2025	Grenada	61–12	Montserrat
08:30

Saturday, 30 August 2025	Saint Vincent and the Grenadines	47–41	Antigua and Barbuda
17:00	Mary-Ann Frederick 23/24 (96%); Shanique Deshong 11/16 (69%); Kristiana Christopher 9/10 (90%); Shellisa Davis 4/7 (57%)		Rayana Regis 21/26 (81%); Erverdine Parker-Barnarde 20/33 (61%)

Saturday, 30 August 2025	Barbados	66–42	Dominica
19:00

Saturday, 30 August 2025	Grenada	48–52	Saint Lucia
19:00

=== Round 9 ===
Sunday, 31 August 2025	Barbados	62–39	Saint Lucia
06.30	Faye Agard 36/40 (90%); Damina Walrond 23/31 (74%) ?? 3	Report

Sunday, 31 August 2025	Cayman Islands	64–26	Antigua and Barbuda
06.30

Sunday, 31 August 2025	Dominica	49–30	Anguilla
17.00

Sunday, 31 August 2025	Barbados	62–14	Antigua and Barbuda
17.00

Sunday, 31 August 2025	Saint Lucia	50–43	Cayman Islands
19.00

Sunday, 31 August 2025	Grenada	64–63	Saint Vincent and the Grenadines
19.00	Lottysha Cato 56/61 (92%); Celina Brown 8/10 (80%)		Mary-Ann Frederick 56/59 (95%); Shellisa Davis 7/8 (88%)

== Final table ==
Pos	Team	P	W	L	D	GF	GA	GD	Pts
1	Saint Vincent and the Grenadines	9	8	1	0	601	329	+272	16
	Barbados	8	7	1	0	531	317	+214	14
2	Grenada	9	7	2	0	529	348	+181	14
3	Saint Lucia	8	6	2	0	390	316	+74	12
	Cayman Islands	8	5	3	0	472	308	+164	10
4	Antigua and Barbuda	9	4	5	0	343	289	+54	8
5	Dominica	8	2	6	0	364	451	-87	4
6	Anguilla	8	2	6	0	212	421	-209	4
7	Montserrat	8	1	7	0	134	451	-317	2
	Guyana	7	0	7	0	129	463	-334	0

Barbados, Cayman Islands, and Guyana were guest teams and did not compete for the Gloria Ballantyne Championship Trophy

== Award winners ==
Award	Winner
Gloria Ballantyne Championship Trophy	Saint Vincent and the Grenadines
MVP of the Tournament	Mary-Ann Frederick
Most Accurate Shooter	Mary-Ann Frederick 429/466 (92%)
Best Centre Court Player	Katherine Gow Cayman Islands
Best Shooting Team	Saint Vincent and the Grenadines
Best Defending Team	Saint Vincent and the Grenadines
Most Disciplined Team	Anguilla
Best Team on Parade	Grenada
