= Netball in Trinidad and Tobago =

- Country: Trinidad and Tobago
- Governing body: Trinidad and Tobago Netball Association
- National team: Trinidad and Tobago

Netball in Trinidad and Tobago is organised by the Trinidad and Tobago Netball Association. The Trinidad and Tobago national netball team regularly competes in international netball competitions such as the Netball World Cup and the Netball at the Commonwealth Games. There are several active netball leagues across the country, most notably the All Sectors Netball League.

== Governing body ==
The Trinidad and Tobago Netball Association is the main governing body for netball in Trinidad and Tobago. It is affiliated to World Netball, Americas Netball and the Trinidad and Tobago Olympic Committee. It is responsible for organising and administering the Trinidad and Tobago national netball team.

== National team ==
In 1952, Lystra Lewis, the pioneering netball coach and administrator, first coached the Trinidad and Tobago national netball team. Competitive netball among Caribbean and West Indies countries started in 1954 with a triangular tournament featuring Trinidad and Tobago, Saint Vincent and the Grenadines and Grenada. In 1954, Lewis was instrumental in establishing the West Indies Netball Board in an effort to formalise netball tournaments. These early tournaments evolved into the West Indies Netball Championships. Trinidad and Tobago are the only team other than Australia and New Zealand to have won a Netball World Cup. Trinidad and Tobago hosted the 1979 World Netball Tournament in Port of Spain. With a team coached by Lystra Lewis, captained by Sherril Peters and featuring Jean Pierre, Trinidad and Tobago won eight of their nine matches in the round-robin stage. This included a 40–38 win over Australia. However, both Australia and New Zealand also won eight of their nine matches. There were no playoffs to determine an outright winner and the tournament organisers declared all three teams champions. Trinidad and Tobago were bronze medallists at the 1983 World Netball Tournament and shared the silver medal at the 1987 World Netball Tournament.

| Debut | Tournament | Best result |
|---|---|---|
| 1963 | Netball World Cup | Joint 1st (1979) |
| 2010 | Netball at the Commonwealth Games | 8th (2010) |
| 1954 | AFNA Championships | 1st (19+ titles) |
| 2007 | Netball World Cup Qualifiers | 1st (2006, 2010, 2015, 2019) |
| 2007 | Netball Singapore Nations Cup | 2nd (2007) |
| 2023 | Central American and Caribbean Games | 1st (2026) |

== International tournaments ==
Trinidad and Tobago has hosted the following international tournaments.

Tournaments
1979 World Netball Tournament
2012 AFNA Championships
Fast5 Netball at the 2023 Commonwealth Youth Games

== Venues ==
| Venue | City/Town | |
|---|---|---|
| Eastern Regional Indoor Sports Arena | Tacarigua | Home of the All Sectors Netball League. |
| Jean Pierre Sports Complex | Wrightson Road, Port of Spain | Formerly, the West Regional Park Complex. It hosted the 1979 World Netball Tournament. It was re-named in honour of Jean Pierre. It has also served as the headquarters of the Trinidad and Tobago Netball Association. |
| Lystra Lewis Netball Courts | St Clair, Port of Spain | Home of the Lystra Lewis Port of Spain Netball League. Named after Lystra Lewis. |
| Shaw Park Cultural Complex | Scarborough | Home of the Tobago Netball League and host venue for the Fast5 Netball at the 2023 Commonwealth Youth Games. |

== Leagues ==
=== All Sectors Netball League ===
The All Sectors Netball League is the top level league featuring teams from Trinidad and Tobago. It was formed in 1990 and is affiliated with the Trinidad and Tobago Netball Association. The league is effectively a business houses league and features teams representing public and private companies, government services and departments and universities. As of 2026, the league features four divisions, including a Premiership and a men's netball division. Teams in the league also compete in numerous knockout competitions throughout the season, including a series of Fast5 knockouts. During the Premiership era, UTT Patriots and the Trinidad and Tobago Fire Service team have been the league's most successful teams. Between 2012 and 2024, Patriots and Fire and won every Premiership title between them.

=== Lystra Lewis Port of Spain Netball League ===
The Port of Spain Netball League was formed in 1939. It is one of the oldest and most active city leagues. In 1945, Lystra Lewis, served as the leagues Secretary and Treasurer and the league was later named after her. It has operated out of several venues across Port of Spain, including the Lystra Lewis Netball Courts in Nelson Mandela Park in St Clair. More recently, the Woodbrook Youth Facility has served as the host venue. In 2025, the league featured 20 teams playing in six divisions, including a men's netball division.

=== Republic Bank Laventille Netball League ===
In 2025, the Republic Bank Laventille Netball League featured teams representing 28 youth clubs across six divisions. The league's main sponsor is Republic Bank. As of 2025, they had partnered with the League for 38 years. While rooted in the Laventille community, the league features clubs from across Trinidad and Tobago. The League has produced national coaches, international umpires and Trinidad and Tobago netball internationals, including Tia Bruno and Kalifa McCollin.

=== Joan Yuille-Williams San Fernando Netball League ===
The Joan Yuille-Williams San Fernando Netball League is based in San Fernando, Trinidad and Tobago. The league's home venue is the Southern Indoor Sports Arena in Pleasantville. The league is one of the longest-running netball competitions in Trinidad and Tobago and in 2025 celebrated its 77th season. In 2025 it was re-named after Joan Yuille-Williams, the government minister who is a patron of the league. In 2025, the league featured 13 teams from eight clubs, playing in three divisions.

=== Tobago Netball League ===
Since 1962, Tobago has had its own netball league. Its home venue is the Shaw Park Cultural Complex in Scarborough.
