= Latonia Blackman =

Barbados netball international

Personal information
- Full name: Latonia Natasha Carolann Blackman
- Born: 6 October 1982 (age 43) Bridgetown
- Height: 1.73 m (5 ft 8 in)

Netball career
- Playing positions: GS, GA, WA, C, WA, GD, GK,
Years	Club team	Apps
199x–202x	Pride of Villa	
2015	Brittons Hill	
Years	National team	Caps
1998–2025	Barbados	203

Latonia Blackman (born 6 October 1982) is a former Barbados netball international. Between 1998 and 2025, she made 203 senior appearances for Barbados. She is one of the world's most capped netball internationals. While representing Barbados, she has played in all seven netball positions. Between 1999 and 2023 she represented Barbados at six Netball World Cups. Between 1998 and 2022, she also represented Barbados in seven Commonwealth Games tournaments. Blackman captained Barbados at the 2010, 2014 and 2022 Commonwealth Games and the 2023 Netball World Cup Americas qualifiers.

== Early life and family ==
Latonia Blackman was born on 6 October 1982 in Bridgetown, Barbados. She is the daughter of Beverley Blackman (1959–2023) and has three siblings – Julia, Nadia, and Kerry. Her sister, Nadia, is also a former Barbados netball international and featured at the 2010 Commonwealth Games.

== Playing career ==
=== Clubs ===
Blackman played for Pride of Villa in the Barbados Netball Association's Division 1 league. Her team mates have included her sister, Nadia Blackman. She has also played for Brittons Hill in Barbados Workers' Union’s competitions.

=== Barbados ===
Between 1999 and 2023, Blackman represented Barbados at six Netball World Cups. Together with Rhonda John-Davis, Jade Clarke and Geva Mentor, she is one of only four players to feature in six Netball World Cups. Between 1998 and 2022, she also represented Barbados in seven Commonwealth Games tournaments. In November 2013, Blackman captained Barbados as they won a quadrangular tournament that also featured hosts Northern Ireland as well as Botswana and Saint Lucia. She captained Barbados at the 2010 and 2014 Commonwealth Games. In December 2017, at the Barbados Olympic Association awards, she was named the Senior Female Athlete of the Year and also received the President's Award. In December 2021, alongside Shonette Azore-Bruce, she co-captained Barbados during an away series against Scotland. Blackman and Azore-Bruce went on to co-captain Barbados at the 2022 Commonwealth Games and the 2023 Netball World Cup Americas qualifiers. On 27 August 2025, at the 2025 ECCB International Netball Series, Blackman made her 200th senior appearance for Barbados in a match against Saint Vincent and the Grenadines. While representing Barbados, she has played in all seven netball positions.

Tournaments	Place
1998 Commonwealth Games	8th
1999 World Netball Championships	10th
2002 Commonwealth Games	9th
2003 World Netball Championships	7th
2006 Commonwealth Games	10th
2010 AFNA World Netball Championship qualifiers	2nd
2010 Commonwealth Games	7th
2011 World Netball Championships	11th
2014 Commonwealth Games	11th
2015 Netball World Cup	13th
2018 Commonwealth Games	10th
2018 AFNA Championships	2nd
2019 Netball World Cup	12th
2022 ECCB International Netball Series	
2022 Commonwealth Games	12th
2023 Netball World Cup Regional Qualifier – Americas	3rd
2023 Central American and Caribbean Games	4th
2023 Netball World Cup	14th
2023 ECCB International Netball Series	
2025 ECCB International Netball Series	
