= 2023 ECCB International Netball Series =

International netball series hosted by Antigua and Barbuda

Tournament details
- Host country: Antigua and Barbuda
- City: St. John's
- Venue: YMCA Sports Complex
- Dates: 29 September–7 October 2023
- Teams: 9

Final positions
- Champions: Grenada (2nd title)
- Runners-up: Saint Vincent and the Grenadines
- Third place: Antigua and Barbuda

Tournament statistics
- Matches played: 36
- Top scorer(s): Carlene Alexander; Grenada; 368

The 2023 ECCB International Netball Series, also known as the 2023 OECS International Netball Series, was the third ECCB International Netball Series. It was organised by the Caribbean Netball Association. Seven national netball teams/Eastern Caribbean Central Bank members, including the hosts, Antigua and Barbuda, played a series of netball test matches in September and October 2023 at St. John's YMCA Sports Complex. They were also joined by guest teams Barbados and Cayman Islands.

Barbados effectively won the overall series after winning all eight of their matches. Latonia Blackman was voted the Most Accurate Shooter and Shonica Griffith the Best Midcourt Player. Barbados were also named the Best Defensive Team. Grenada won the Gloria Ballantyne Championship Trophy and several other awards including Most Disciplined Team, Top Scorer for Carlene Alexander and Best Defending Player for Kerissa Thomas. Saint Vincent and the Grenadines finished as runners up and the hosts, Antigua and Barbuda, finished third.

== Teams, head coaches and captains ==
Seven teams from Eastern Caribbean Central Bank member countries — Antigua and Barbuda, the Commonwealth of Dominica, Grenada, Montserrat, St Kitts and Nevis, Saint Lucia and Saint Vincent and the Grenadines — competed for the Gloria Ballantyne Championship Trophy. Two guest teams, Barbados and Cayman Islands competed for World Netball Rankings points.

Team	Head coach	Captain
Antigua and Barbuda	Karen Joseph	
Barbados	Denise Alleyne	
Cayman Islands	Lyneth Monteith	Katherine Gow
Dominica		
Grenada	Kathyann Gabriel Williams	
Montserrat		
Saint Kitts and Nevis		
Saint Lucia		
Saint Vincent and the Grenadines	Vasha Adams	Kaywanna Charles

== Match officials ==
Umpires

Umpire	Association
Wayne Benti	Saint Lucia
Joel Brown	Trinidad and Tobago
Makeba Clarke	Barbados
Louise Cole	England
Tracy-Ann Griffiths	Jamaica
Moeth Gaymes	St Vincent and the Grenadines
Michelle Maynard	Barbados
Kanika Paul-Payne	Trinidad and Tobago
Terrence Peart	Jamaica
James Thomas	England

Umpire Appointments Panel

Umpire	Association
Sylvester Campbell	Jamaica
Anne Marie Dickson-Lewis	Trinidad and Tobago
Deborah Lynch	Barbados
Joel Young-Strong	Trinidad and Tobago

== Matches ==
=== Day 1 ===
Saturday, 30 September 2023	Saint Vincent and the Grenadines	60–42	Cayman Islands
	Joseann Antoine 40/54 (74%); Shellisa Davis 20/29 (69%)		Kay Copeland 30/37 (81%); Rose Marie Wilson 12/19 (63%)

Saturday, 30 September 2023	Antigua and Barbuda	45–41	Dominica
	Rayana Regis 24/36 (67%); Tashana Bloomfield 21/29 (72%)		Gailyn Gordon-Seraphin 22/27 (81%); Anna Mar Panthier 19/27 (70%)

Saturday, 30 September 2023	Saint Lucia	58–5	Montserrat

Saturday, 30 September 2023	Grenada	58–45	Saint Kitts and Nevis

=== Day 2 ===
Sunday, 1 October 2023	Antigua and Barbuda	25–59	Barbados
	Rayana Regis 21/28 (75%); Jamilia Fitz 4/12 (33%)		Faye Agard 32/39 (82%); Jada Smith 12/19 (63%); Latonia Blackman 9/10 (90%); Brianna Holder 6/7 (86%)

Sunday, 1 October 2023	Saint Vincent and the Grenadines	52–37	Saint Kitts and Nevis
	Joseann Antoine 30/34 (88%); Shellisa Davis 19/27 (70%); Kristiana Christopher 2/4 (50%); Annicia Dallaway 1/2 (50%)	Report	Aaliyah Gibson 27/40 (68%); Rochelle Challenger 10/18 (56%)

Sunday, 1 October 2023	Saint Lucia	34–30	Dominica
	Melika Destang 26/42 (62%)

Sunday, 1 October 2023	Cayman Islands	82–11	Montserrat
	Kay Copeland 53/68 (78%)

=== Day 3 ===
Monday, 2 October 2023	Antigua and Barbuda	21–48	Saint Vincent and the Grenadines
	Rayana Regis 13/21 (62%); Jamilia Fitz 8/12 (67%)		Shellisa Davis 22/38 (58%); Joseann Antoine 13/19 (68%); Kimesha Antoine 13/19 (68%)

Monday, 2 October 2023	Barbados	63–24	Cayman Islands
	Faye Agard 33/44 (75%); Jada Smith 21/32 (66%) ?? 9		Kay Copeland 17/30 (57%) ?? 7

Monday, 2 October 2023	Grenada	68–11	Montserrat
	Carlene Alexander 45/56 (80%); Celina Brown 20/32 (63%) ?? 3		Juana Osborne 9/24 (38%); Amika Osborne ? 2

Monday, 2 October 2023	Dominica	54–51	Saint Kitts and Nevis
	Gailyn Gordon-Seraphin 34/42 (81%); Anna Mar Panthier 20/24 (83%)		Aaliyah Gibson 37/54 (69%); Rochelle Challenger 14/20 (70%)

=== Day 4 ===
Wednesday, 4 October 2023	Antigua and Barbuda	36–29	Saint Lucia
	Rayana Regis 20/24 (83%); Tashana Bloomfield 13/19 (68%) ?? 3		Melika Destand 13/23 (57%); Jacqueline Remy 10/13 (77%); Jo-Ann Anderson 6/16 (38%)

Wednesday, 4 October 2023	Grenada	34–33	Saint Vincent and the Grenadines
	Carlene Alexander 25/29 (86%); Celina Brown 9/17 (53%)		Joseann Antoine 21/28 (75%); Shellisa Davis 12/18 (67%)

Wednesday, 4 October 2023	Barbados	106–11	Montserrat
	Faye Agard 50; Jada Smith 42 ?? 14		Tvara Osbourne 8 ?? 3

Wednesday, 4 October 2023	Cayman Islands	53–45	Saint Kitts and Nevis
	Kay Copeland 38/51 (75%) ?? 15		Aaliyah Gibson 26/37 (70%); Rochelle Challenger 19/24 (79%)

Wednesday, 4 October 2023	Saint Vincent and the Grenadines	53–43	Dominica
	Shellisa Davis 27/42 (64%); Joseann Antoine 25/32 (78%); Kimesha Antoine 1/3 (33%)		Gailyn Gordon-Seraphin 31/36 (86%); Anna Mar Panthier 12/19 (63%)

Wednesday, 4 October 2023	Saint Kitts and Nevis	72–11	Montserrat
	Rochelle Challenger 37/41 (90%); Aaliyah Gibson 35/47 (74%)		Juana Osbourne 11/24 (46%)

Wednesday, 4 October 2023	Barbados	54–25	Saint Lucia
	Faye Agard 21/26 (81%); Latonia Blackman 19; Jada Smith 14		Jacqueline Remy 18/22 (82%) ?? 7

Wednesday, 4 October 2023	Antigua and Barbuda	34–53	Grenada
	Rayana Regis		Carlene Alexander 48/53 (91%) ?? 5

=== Day 5 ===
Thursday, 5 October 2023	Saint Vincent and the Grenadines	78–11	Montserrat	Court 1
6:30	Joseann Antoine 41/53 (77%); Shellisa Davis 19/26 (73%); Annicia Dallaway 14/20 (70%); Kimesha Antoine 4/5 (80%)	Report	Juana Osborne 6/15 (40%); Amika Osborne 5/16 (31%)

Thursday, 5 October 2023	Grenada	57–41	Cayman Islands	Court 2
6:45

Thursday, 5 October 2023	Barbados	74–34	Saint Kitts and Nevis	Court 1
17:30	Latonia Blackman 33/37 (89%); Faye Agard 19/22 (86%); Brianna Holder 16/22 (73%)		Aaliyah Gibson 27/41 (66%); Roshella Challenger 7/12 (58%)

Thursday, 5 October 2023	Antigua and Barbuda	59–8	Montserrat	Court 2
17:45	Rayana Regis 43/62 (69%); Kizzy Hughes 11/17 (65%); Tashana Bloomfield 5/5 (100%)		Juana Osbourne 6/12 (50%); Amika Osbourne 2/10 (20%)

Thursday, 5 October 2023	Cayman Islands	44–33^{1}	Saint Lucia	Court 1
19:30

Thursday, 5 October 2023	Grenada	40–23	Dominica	Court 2
19:45

=== Day 6 ===
Friday, 6 October 2023	Barbados	79–46	Dominica

Friday, 6 October 2023	Saint Kitts and Nevis	44–40	Saint Lucia

Friday, 6 October 2023	Antigua and Barbuda	43–47	Cayman Islands

Friday, 6 October 2023	Barbados	60–36	Grenada

Friday, 6 October 2023	Saint Vincent and the Grenadines	45–32	Saint Lucia
19:30	Joseann Antoine 32/40 (80%); Shellisa Davis 13/18 (72%)	Report	Melika Destand 19/29 (66%); Jacqueline Remy 9/17 (53%); Jo-Ann Anderson 4/5 (80%)

Friday, 6 October 2023	Dominica	73–25	Montserrat

=== Day 7 ===
Saturday, 7 October 2023	Grenada	43–24	Saint Lucia

Saturday, 7 October 2023	Dominica	55–54	Cayman Islands
	Anna Mar Panthier 38/41 (93%)

Saturday, 7 October 2023	Antigua and Barbuda	52–49	Saint Kitts and Nevis
	Rayana Regis 45/54 (83%) ?? 7		Aaliyah Gibson 27/41 (66%); Rochella Challenger 22/26 (85%)

Saturday, 7 October 2023	Barbados	54–39	Saint Vincent and the Grenadines
18:15	Faye Agard 37/47 (79%); Latonia Blackman 15/19 (79%); Damia Walrond 2/4 (50%)	Report	Joseann Antoine 28/33 (85%); Shellisa Davis 4/11 (36%); Shanique DeShong 5/7 (71%); Kimesha Antoine 2/5 (40%)

== Final table ==
Pos	Team	P	W	L	D	GF	GA	GD	Pts
	Barbados	8	8	0	0	549	240	+309	16
1	Grenada	8	7	1	0	389	271	+118	14
2	Saint Vincent and the Grenadines	8	6	2	0	408	287	+126	12
	Cayman Islands	8	4	4	0	361	355	+6	8
3	Antigua and Barbuda	8	4	4	0	315	334	-19	8
4	Dominica	8	3	5	0	365	364	+1	6
5	Saint Kitts and Nevis	8	2	6	0	377	394	-17	4
6	Saint Lucia	8	2	6	0	275	301	-26	4
7	Montserrat	8	0	8	0	93	548	-455	0

Barbados and Cayman Islands were guest teams and did not compete for the Gloria Ballantyne Championship Trophy ^{2}

== Notes ==
- ^1 Conflicting reports give the Cayman Islands and Saint Lucia score as either 34–22 or 44–33.
- ^2 Final table includes results from all 36 matches.

== Award winners ==
=== Overall series ===
Award	Winner	Team
Gloria Ballantyne Championship Trophy	Grenada	
Player of the Tournament		
Best Young Player	Kijana Johnson (aged 16)	Barbados
Veteran Player	Maria Panthier (aged 52)	Dominica
Most Goals	Carlene Alexander 368	Grenada
Most Accurate Shooter	Latonia Blackman	Barbados
Best Defender	Kerissa Thomas	Grenada
Best Midcourt Player	Shonica Griffith	Barbados
Best Team on Parade	Saint Lucia	
Most Disciplined Team	Grenada	
Come Back Team	Montserrat	
Best Defending Team	Barbados	

=== Teams' Individual MVPs ===
Winner	Team
Tonia Greene	Antigua and Barbuda
Shonica Griffith	Barbados
Katherine Gow	Cayman Islands
Gailene Gordon-Sherapine	Dominica
Jaimie John	Grenada
Twila Fenton	Montserrat
Rochelle Challenger	Saint Kitts and Nevis
Malika Desange	Saint Lucia
Sharlisa Davis	Saint Vincent and the Grenadines
