= 2018 AFNA Championships =

International netball series hosted by Barbados

Tournament details
- Host country: Barbados
- City: Bridgetown
- Venue: Garfield Sobers Gymnasium
- Dates: 24 August–2 September 2018
- Teams: 8
- TV partner: YouTube

Final positions
- Champions: Trinidad and Tobago (13th title)
- Runners-up: Barbados
- Third place: Grenada

Tournament statistics
- Matches played: 28

The 2018 AFNA Championships was a tournament organised by the Americas Federation of Netball Associations. It featured eight teams playing a series of netball test matches in August and September 2018 at Bridgetown's Garfield Sobers Gymnasium. The tournament also served as an Americas qualifier for the 2015 Netball World Cup. The hosts, Barbados, were joined by seven other national netball teams. With a team captained by Rhonda John-Davis and coached by Pepe Gomes, Trinidad and Tobago won the series. Barbados finished as runners up. They both qualified for the World Cup. They subsequently joined Jamaica at the World Cup. Jamaica had already qualified for the World Cup via the INF World Rankings. The series was broadcast on the INF's YouTube channel.

== Teams, head coaches and captains ==
Team	Head coach	Captain
Argentina		
Barbados		Latonia Blackman
Canada		
Grenada	Oberon Pitterson-Nattie	
Sint Maarten		
Saint Vincent and the Grenadines	Moeth Gaymes	Nicole Sandy-Stevenson
Trinidad and Tobago	Pepe Gomes	Rhonda John-Davis
United States		

== Matches ==
=== Day 1 ===
Friday, 24 August 2018	Barbados	105–10	Argentina
20:00

=== Day 2 ===
Saturday, 25 August 2018	Trinidad and Tobago	86–29	United States
14:00	Samantha Wallace 41/46 (89%); Kalifa McCollin 24/26 (92%); Joelisa Cooper 16; Tahira Hollingsworth 5	Report

Saturday, 25 August 2018	Grenada	62–49	Saint Vincent and the Grenadines
16:00

Saturday, 25 August 2018	Sint Maarten	36–32	Argentina
18:00

Saturday, 25 August 2018	Barbados	70–28	Canada
20:00

=== Day 3 ===
Sunday, 26 August 2018	Grenada	106–11	Argentina
16:00

Sunday, 26 August 2018	Canada	45–43	United States
18:00

Sunday, 26 August 2018	Barbados	110–12	Sint Maarten
20:00

=== Day 4 ===
Monday, 27 August 2018	Trinidad and Tobago	80–26	Canada
16:00	Samantha Wallace 32/34 (94%); Joelisa Cooper 22; Kalifa McCollin 12; Tahirah Hollingsworth 14	Report

Monday, 27 August 2018	Grenada	72–39	United States
18:00

Monday, 27 August 2018	Saint Vincent and the Grenadines	78–27	Sint Maarten
20:00

=== Day 5 ===
Tuesday, 28 August 2018	United States	74–20	Argentina
16:00

Tuesday, 28 August 2018	Barbados	65–31	Saint Vincent and the Grenadines
18:00

Tuesday, 28 August 2018	Trinidad and Tobago	82–41	Grenada
20:00	Samantha Wallace 45/49 (92%); Kalifa McCollin 25/26 (96%); Joelisa Cooper 6 Tahirah Hollingsworth 6	Report

=== Day 6 ===
Thursday, 30 August 2018	Saint Vincent and the Grenadines	69–33	United States
16:00

Thursday, 30 August 2018	Trinidad and Tobago	95–9	Sint Maarten
18:00	Samantha Wallace 38; Joelisa Cooper 30; Kalifa McCollin 16; Tahirah Hollingsworth 11	Stats

Thursday, 30 August 2018	Grenada	82–41	Canada
20:00

=== Day 7 ===
Friday, 31 August 2018	Trinidad and Tobago	112–12	Argentina
14:00	Samantha Wallace 36; Joelisa Cooper 33; Kalifa McCollin 21; Tahirah Hollingsworth 20 ?? 2	Report

Friday, 31 August 2018	Saint Vincent and the Grenadines	53–44	Canada
16:00

Friday, 31 August 2018	Grenada	83–19	Sint Maarten
18:00

Friday, 31 August 2018	Barbados	82–41	United States
20:00

=== Day 8 ===
Saturday, 1 September 2018	Canada	66–22	Argentina
14:00

Saturday, 1 September 2018	Trinidad and Tobago	80–26	Saint Vincent and the Grenadines
16:00	Kalifa McCollin 32; Samantha Wallace 25; Joelisa Cooper 18 ?? 5	Report

Saturday, 1 September 2018	Barbados	58–43	Grenada
18:00

Saturday, 1 September 2018	United States	52–36	Sint Maarten
20:00

=== Day 9 ===
Sunday, 2 September 2018	Canada	65–27	Sint Maarten
15:00

Sunday, 2 September 2018	Saint Vincent and the Grenadines	88–24	Argentina
17:00

Sunday, 2 September 2018	Barbados	51–65	Trinidad and Tobago
19:00		Report	Samantha Wallace 39/41 (95%); Kalifa McCollin 26/28 (93%)

== Final table ==
Pos	Team	P	W	D	L	GF	GA	GD	Pts
1	Trinidad and Tobago	7	7	0	0	600	194	+406	14
2	Barbados	7	6	0	1	535	223	+312	12
3	Grenada	7	5	0	2	466	307	+159	10
4	Saint Vincent and the Grenadines	7	4	0	3	394	335	+59	8
5	Canada	7	3	0	4	323	354	-31	6
6	United States	7	2	0	5	304	404	-100	4
7	Sint Maarten	7	1	0	6	166	515	-349	2
8	Argentina	7	0	0	7	131	587	-456	0

Qualified for the 2019 Netball World Cup

== Medallists ==
Gold	Silver	Bronze
Trinidad and Tobago; Coach: Pepe Gomes	Barbados; Coach: Sandra Bruce-Small	Grenada; Coach: Oberon Pitterson-Nattie
Joelisa Cooper; Kemba Duncan; Shaquanda Greene; Candice Guerero; Tahirah Hollingsworth; Onella Jack; Rhonda John-Davis (c); Kalifa McCollin; Shantel Seemungal; Shernece Seemungal; Daystar Swift; Samantha Wallace	Shonette Azore-Bruce; Latonia Blackman (c); Sade Browne; Samantha Browne; Damisha Croney (vc); Brianna Holder; Rieah Holder; Teresa Howell; Amanda Knight; Nikita Payne; Tonisha Rock-Yaw; Shonte Seale; Sabreena Smith; Shonica Wharton	
