= Geane Hohipuha =

New Zealand netball player

Personal information
- Full name: née: Katae
- Born: 16 June 1960 (age 66)
- Height: 1.78 m (5 ft 10 in)
- Spouse: Raymond Hohipuha

Netball career
- Playing positions: GS, GA, WA
Years	National team	Caps
1979-82	New Zealand	10
Medal record
Representing New Zealand
World Netball Tournament
Gold medal – first place	1979 Trinidad	Tournament

Geane Hohipuha is a former netball player who represented New Zealand on ten occasions.

== Netball career ==
Geane Hohipuha (née Katae) was born on 16 June 1960. She married Raymond Hohipuha and they had five children. Having played for Canterbury, she was the 68th woman to be selected to play for the Silver Ferns, the New Zealand national netball team and made her first appearance in 1979 against Saint Lucia in the 1979 World Netball Tournament. That tournament resulted in a three-way tie for first place between New Zealand, Australia and the hosts. Hohipuha was also a member of the team that played Australia and England in 1982. She played in the Goal shooter (GS), Goal attack (GA) and Wing attack (WA) positions.
