= Connie Francis (netball) =

Jamaican netball player and coach

Personal information
- Born: c. 1968 (age 57–58)^{(Note 1)}
- Height: 1.70 m (5 ft 7 in)

Netball career
- Playing positions: GA, GS
Years	Club team	Apps
198x–20xx	Waulgrovians	
Years	National team	Caps
1985–2003	Jamaica	120+
2022	Jamaica	0
Coaching career
- Years: Team
- 2007–2011: Jamaica
- 2012–2015: Saint Lucia
- 2016: Jamaica Fast5
- 2016–2023: Mico University College
- 2017–2019: Manchester Spurs
- 2019–2023: Jamaica
- 2024: Saint Lucia
Medal record
Representing Jamaica
World Netball Championships
Bronze medal – third place	1991 Sydney	Team
Bronze medal – third place	2003 Kingston	Team
World Games
Bronze medal – third place	1993 The Hague	Team

Connie Francis is a former Jamaica netball international and Jamaica national netball team head coach. As a player, she was a member of the Jamaica teams that were bronze medallists at the 1991 and 2003 World Netball Championships and 1993 World Games. Francis captained Jamaica at the 1995 and 1999 World Netball Championships. As head coach, Francis guided Jamaica to bronze medals at the 2007 World Netball Championships and 2023 Netball World Cup and to the silver medal at the 2022 Commonwealth Games. The Gleaner described her as "the most successful coach of the national senior team." In November 2024, ahead of the 2025 Netball Super League season, Birmingham Panthers appointed Francis as their Director of Netball.In 2026, Francis joined Prior’s Field School in Godalming, Surrey, as International Head Coach of the school’s Netball Pathway Programme, where she leads the development and coaching of netball players across the Junior and Senior Pathways, for girls aged 11–18.

== Playing career ==
=== Waulgrovians ===
During her playing career, Francis played club netball for Waulgrovians.

=== Jamaica ===
Between 1987 and 2003, Francis played for Jamaica at five World Netball Championships. She was a member of the Jamaica teams that were bronze medallists at the 1991 and 2003 World Netball Championships. She also won a bronze medal with Jamaica at the 1993 World Games. Francis captained Jamaica, including at the 1995 and 1999 World Netball Championships. She also represented Jamaica at the 1998 Commonwealth Games. Ahead of the 2022 Taini Jamison Trophy Series against New Zealand, complications with passports and visas resulted in Francis, then aged 54 and serving as head coach, been named in the squad. Five Jamaica players named in the original squad were unable to travel. Francis eventually had to include herself, new mother Romelda Aiken-George and the retired Carla Borrego in their squad to make up the mandatory ten players required for a recognised international match.

Tournaments	Place
1987 World Netball Tournament	5th
1991 World Netball Championships	3rd place, bronze medalist(s)
1993 World Games	3rd place, bronze medalist(s)
1995 World Netball Championships	5th
1998 Commonwealth Games	5th
1999 World Netball Championships	4th
2003 World Netball Championships	3rd place, bronze medalist(s)
2022 Taini Jamison Trophy Series	2nd

== Coaching career ==
=== Jamaica ===
Between 2007 and 2011 and again from 2019 to 2023, Francis served as head coach of Jamaica. The Gleaner described her as "the most successful coach of the national senior team." In between these two spells, she also coached Jamaica at the 2016 Fast5 Netball World Series. The highlight of her first spell in charge was guiding Jamaica to the bronze medal at the 2007 World Netball Championships. During her second spell in charge, she guided Jamaica to a silver medal at the 2022 Commonwealth Games and a bronze medal at the 2023 Netball World Cup.

Tournaments	Place	Team
2007 World Netball Championships	3rd place, bronze medalist(s)	Jamaica
2008 AFNA Championships	1st	Jamaica
2009 World Netball Series	2nd	Jamaica
2010 Taini Jamison Trophy Series	2nd	Jamaica
2010 Commonwealth Games	4th	Jamaica
2010 World Netball Series	3rd	Jamaica
2012 AFNA Championships	4th	Saint Lucia
2014 Commonwealth Games	12th	Saint Lucia
2016 Fast5 Netball World Series	5th	Jamaica
2020 Netball Nations Cup	2nd	Jamaica
2021 England Jamaica netball series	2nd	Jamaica
2022 Commonwealth Games	2nd place, silver medalist(s)	Jamaica
2022 Taini Jamison Trophy Series	2nd	Jamaica
2023 England Jamaica netball series	2nd	Jamaica
2023 Netball World Cup Regional Qualifier – Americas	1st	Jamaica
2023 Netball World Cup	3rd place, bronze medalist(s)	Jamaica
2024 ECCB International Netball Series	3rd	Saint Lucia

=== Saint Lucia ===
Between 2012 and 2015, Francis served as head coach of Saint Lucia, helping them qualify for the 2014 Commonwealth Games. This was their debut appearance in the tournament.

=== Manchester Spurs ===
Between 2017 and 2019, Francis served as head coach of Manchester Spurs in the Berger Elite League. During this time, she guided Spurs to two finals and one league title. In 2018, they finished as runner-up to Kingston Hummingbirds. In 2019, Spurs finished as champions for the first time after beating defending champions, Kingston Hummingbirds, 71–65 in extra-time in the deciding game of the best of three series.

=== Mico University College ===
Between 2016 and 2023, Francis served as head netball coach of Mico University College. During this time she guided Mico to several intercollegiate netball titles.

=== Birmingham Panthers ===
In November 2024, ahead of the 2025 Netball Super League season, Birmingham Panthers appointed Francis as their Director of Netball.

== Honours ==
=== Coaching career ===
Jamaica

- Commonwealth Games
  - Runners Up: 2022
- Netball World Cup Qualifiers
  - Winners: 2023
- AFNA Championships
  - Winners: 2008
- Taini Jamison Trophy
  - Runners Up: 2010, 2022
- Netball Nations Cup
  - Runners Up: 2020
- World Netball Series
  - Runners up: 2009

Manchester Spurs

- Berger Elite League
  - Winners: 2019
  - Runners Up: 2018

== Notes ==
- ^1 A list of 1998 Commonwealth Games players and coaches gives Francis' birthday as 14 July 1963. However, later reports suggest she was born between 1965 and 1969.
