= Netball World Cup Qualifiers – Americas =

International netball competition

- Sport: Netball
- Founded: 2006
- First season: 2006
- Organising body: Americas Netball
- Most recent champion: Jamaica
- Most titles: Trinidad and Tobago (4 titles)
- Broadcaster: YouTube
- Related competitions: AFNA Championships

The Netball World Cup Qualifiers – Americas are a series of netball tournaments organised by Americas Netball to determine who will represent the Americas at Netball World Cups. AFNA Championships have also served as Netball World Cup qualifiers. Trinidad and Tobago are the series most successful team. Since 2007, the Americas has had three representatives at Netball World Cups. Jamaica have qualified for recent World Cups based on their top six placing on the World Netball Rankings, while two teams have qualified via this series. Jamaica, did however enter a team in the 2023 series.

== History ==
=== Tournaments ===
Tournaments	Host	Winners	Runners up	3rd
2007	Barbados	Trinidad and Tobago	Barbados	Saint Vincent and the Grenadines
2011	Saint Lucia	Trinidad and Tobago	Barbados	United States
2015	Canada	Trinidad and Tobago	Barbados	United States
2019	Barbados	Trinidad and Tobago	Barbados	Grenada
2023	Jamaica	Jamaica	Trinidad and Tobago	Barbados
2027	Barbados			

=== Qualifiers ===
Tournaments	Qualifier 1	Qualifier 2	Qualifier 3
2007 World Netball Championships	Jamaica	Trinidad and Tobago	Barbados
2011 World Netball Championships	Jamaica	Trinidad and Tobago	Barbados
2015 Netball World Cup	Jamaica	Trinidad and Tobago	Barbados
2019 Netball World Cup	Jamaica	Trinidad and Tobago	Barbados
2023 Netball World Cup	Jamaica	Trinidad and Tobago	Barbados
2027 Netball World Cup	Jamaica		

=== Participants ===
Team	(Barbados) 2007	(Saint Lucia) 2011	(Canada) 2015	(Barbados) 2019	(Jamaica) 2023	(Barbados) 2027
Antigua and Barbuda	5th	-	-	-	9th	
Argentina	-	-	7th	8th	-	
Barbados	2nd	2nd	2nd	2nd	3rd	
Canada	4th	6th	4th	5th	-	
Cayman Islands	-	-	6th	-	8th	
Grenada	-	-	5th	3rd	5th	
Guyana	8th	-	-	-	-	
Jamaica	-	-	-	-	1st	
Saint Kitts and Nevis	6th	-	-	-	-	
Saint Lucia	-	4th	-	-	7th	
Saint Vincent and the Grenadines	3rd	5th	-	4th	4th	
Sint Maarten	-	-	-	7th	-	
Trinidad and Tobago	1st	1st	1st	1st	2nd	
United States	7th	3rd	3rd	6th	6th	
