= Janice Waddy =

New Zealand netball player

Personal information
- Full name: (née: Henderson)
- Born: 31 March 1958 (age 68)
- Height: 1.69 m (5 ft 7 in)

Netball career
- Playing positions: WD, C, GD, WA
Years	National team	Caps
1979-81	New Zealand	6
Medal record
New Zealand
World Netball Tournament
Gold medal – first place	1979 Trinidad and Tobago	Tournament

Janice Waddy (born 1958) is a former netball player from New Zealand, who represented the national team on six occasions and won a gold medal at the 1979 World Netball Tournament.

== Netball career ==
Janice Waddy (née Henderson) was born on 31 March 1958. She went to school at St Margaret's College in Christchurch, in the Canterbury region of the South Island of New Zealand. Between 1976 and 1978 she obtained a diploma in education, specialising in physical education, from the Christchurch Teachers College, which was subsequently merged into the University of Canterbury. Waddy played netball for Canterbury and in 1979 was chosen to be part of the New Zealand national netball team, known as the Silver Ferns. Playing as Janice Henderson, she took part in the 1979 World Netball Tournament, which resulted in a three-way tie for first place between, New Zealand, Australia and the hosts. She was selected again in 1981 for series against England and Australia. She was an adaptable player who played in several positions.

== Australia ==
Waddy later moved to Australia. From 2001 to 2008 she worked for the Australian Sports Commission in Canberra, before joining the commission's parent organisation, the Department of Health, working on the department's involvement with major sporting events. She later moved to the Department of Infrastructure and Regional Development, to work on a capacity-building project for Papua New Guinea.
