= AFNA Championships =

International netball competition

- Sport: Netball
- Founded: 1954
- First season: 1954
- Organising body: West Indies Netball Board; Caribbean Netball Association; Americas Federation of Netball Associations
- Most recent champion: Trinidad and Tobago (2018)
- Most titles: Jamaica; Trinidad and Tobago
- Broadcaster: YouTube
- Related competitions: Netball World Cup Qualifiers – Americas

The AFNA Championships were a series of netball tournaments organised by the Americas Federation of Netball Associations. It was effectively a successor tournament to the earlier West Indies Netball Championship and Caribbean Netball Championship. Jamaica and Trinidad and Tobago are the series most successful teams. Later AFNA tournaments served as qualifiers for both Netball at the Commonwealth Games and the Netball World Cup.

== History ==
=== West Indies Netball Championship ===
Competitive netball among Caribbean/West Indies countries started in 1954 with a triangular tournament featuring Trinidad and Tobago, Saint Vincent and the Grenadines and Grenada. In 1954, Lystra Lewis, the pioneering Trinidad and Tobago netball coach and administrator, was instrumental in establishing the West Indies Netball Board in an effort to formalise these early netball tournaments. In 1956, the original three were joined by Barbados. They were subsequently joined by Jamaica, Dominica and Saint Kitts and Nevis. Jamaica made their Test debut at the 1959 West Indies tournament hosted by Montserrat. In 1965, Saint Kitts and Nevis made their tournament debut.

=== Caribbean Netball Championships ===
After 1975, the winners were awarded the Dr. Eric Williams Trophy, named after Eric Williams, the first Prime Minister of Trinidad and Tobago. The Caribbean Netball Association also became the tournaments main organiser. By 1977 the tournament had evolved into the Caribbean Netball Championships. Trinidad and Tobago dominated this era, winning eleven titles between 1977 and 1993. Saint Kitts and Nevis were the only team to challenge Trinidad and Tobago. After winning the 1973 tournament, in 1978 Saint Kitts and Nevis won a second championship. After 1984 Jamaica began to participate more regularly and, from 1989 onwards, they replaced Trinidad and Tobago as the dominant team, winning nearly every tournament they entered.

=== AFNA Championships ===
In 1994, the Caribbean Netball Association and the Americas Federation of Netball Associations hosted a joint tournament and Canada and the United States were invited to enter for the first time. Later AFNA tournaments served as qualifiers for both Netball at the Commonwealth Games and the Netball World Cup.

== Tournaments ==
West Indies Netball Championship

Tournaments	Host	Winners	Runners up
1954			
1958	Dominica		
1959	Montserrat		
1960	Saint Vincent and the Grenadines		
1961	Barbados		
1965	Dominica		
1970	Saint Lucia		
1971	Antigua and Barbuda	Trinidad and Tobago ??	
1972	Saint Kitts	Trinidad and Tobago	Saint Kitts and Nevis
1973	Grenada	Saint Kitts and Nevis	Trinidad and Tobago
1974	Trinidad and Tobago	Trinidad and Tobago	
1975		Trinidad and Tobago	

Caribbean Netball Championships

Tournaments	Host	Winners	Runners up	3rd
1977	Bahamas	Trinidad and Tobago ??		
1978	Saint Vincent and the Grenadines	Saint Kitts and Nevis		
1980	Saint Kitts	Trinidad and Tobago		Saint Kitts and Nevis
1981		Trinidad and Tobago		
1982	Grenada	Trinidad and Tobago	Grenada	Barbados
1983	Bermuda	Trinidad and Tobago		
1984 ^{(Note 1)}	Dominica	Trinidad and Tobago	Barbados	Saint Vincent and the Grenadines
1985	Nevis	Trinidad and Tobago	Saint Vincent and the Grenadines	Barbados
1986	Saint Lucia	Trinidad and Tobago		
1988	Cayman Islands	Trinidad and Tobago	Grenada	
1989	Trinidad and Tobago	Jamaica		
1990	Jamaica	Jamaica		
1991		Jamaica		
1992 ^{(Note 2)}	Antigua and Barbuda	Trinidad and Tobago	Saint Vincent and the Grenadines	Barbados
1993 ^{(Note 2)}	Montserrat	Trinidad and Tobago	Saint Vincent and the Grenadines	Barbados

AFNA Championships

Tournaments	Host	Winners	Runners up	3rd
1994	Saint Vincent and the Grenadines	Jamaica	Saint Vincent and the Grenadines	
1996	Saint Kitts	Jamaica		
1997	Grenada	Jamaica	Barbados	Saint Vincent and the Grenadines
1998	Saint Lucia	Saint Vincent and the Grenadines	Barbados	
2000	Nevis	Jamaica		
2001	Dominica	Jamaica		
2004	Trinidad and Tobago	Jamaica	Barbados	Trinidad and Tobago
2005 ^{(Note 3)}	Saint Vincent and the Grenadines	Saint Vincent and the Grenadines	Trinidad and Tobago	Canada
2006 ^{(Note 4)}	Barbados	Trinidad and Tobago	Barbados	Saint Vincent and the Grenadines
2008 ^{(Note 5)}	Saint Vincent and the Grenadines	Jamaica	Trinidad and Tobago	Barbados
2012 ^{(Note 6)}	Trinidad and Tobago	Jamaica	Barbados	Trinidad and Tobago
2014 ^{(Note 7)}	Canada	Trinidad and Tobago	Barbados	United States
2018 ^{(Note 8)}	Barbados	Trinidad and Tobago	Barbados	Grenada

== Notes ==
- ^1 In 1984 Barbados and Saint Vincent and the Grenadines finished as joint runners-up. However, Barbados had the better goal difference.
- ^2 In both 1992 and 1993 Trinidad and Tobago, Barbados and Saint Vincent and the Grenadines finished as joint winners. In 1994 goal difference was introduced to decide final positions.
- ^3 The 2005 AFNA Championships also counted as a 2006 Commonwealth Games qualifier.
- ^4 The 2006 AFNA Championships also counted as a 2007 World Netball Championships qualifier.
- ^5 The 2008 AFNA Championships also counted as a 2010 Commonwealth Games qualifier.
- ^6 The 2012 AFNA Championships also counted as a 2014 Commonwealth Games qualifier.
- ^7 The 2014 AFNA Championships also counted as a 2015 Netball World Cup qualifier.
- ^8 The 2018 AFNA Championships also counted as a 2019 Netball World Cup qualifier.
