= 2019 ECCB International Netball Series =

International netball series hosted by Saint Vincent and the Grenadines

Tournament details
- Host country: Saint Vincent and the Grenadines
- City: Arnos Vale
- Venue: Arnos Vale Sporting Complex
- Dates: 15–21 June 2019
- Teams: 5
- TV partners: VC3TV/YouTube

Final positions
- Champions: Grenada (1st title)
- Runners-up: Saint Vincent and the Grenadines
- Third place: Saint Lucia

Tournament statistics
- Matches played: 20

The 2019 ECCB International Netball Series, also known as the 2019 OECS International Netball Series, was the inaugural ECCB International Netball Series. It was organised by the Caribbean Netball Association. Five national netball teams/Eastern Caribbean Central Bank members, including the hosts Saint Vincent and the Grenadines, played a series of netball test matches in June 2019 at Arnos Vale's Sporting Complex. The series featured two rounds of round robin matches. Grenada and Saint Vincent and the Grenadines both finished the series with 13 points after they won six and drew one of their eight matches. However, Grenada had the better goal average, and as a result became the first winners of the Gloria Ballantyne Championship Trophy. Antigua and Barbuda, Dominica and Saint Lucia all became eligible for INF World Rankings after playing eight test matches within a calendar year. The series was streamed live on VC3TV's on YouTube channel.

== Teams, head coaches and captains ==
Team	Head coach	Captain
Antigua and Barbuda	Karen Joseph	
Dominica		
Grenada	Kathy-Ann Gabriel	Cecile Roberts; Denise Cameron
Saint Lucia		
Saint Vincent and the Grenadines	Vasha Adams	Mary-Ann Frederick

== Matches ==
=== Day 1 ===
Saturday, 15 June 2019	Saint Vincent and the Grenadines	54–25	Dominica
17:30

Saturday, 15 June 2019	Grenada	64–37	Saint Lucia
19:00

=== Day 2 ===
Sunday, 16 June 2019	Grenada	59–30	Antigua and Barbuda
17:30

Sunday, 16 June 2019	Saint Vincent and the Grenadines	42–39	Saint Lucia
19:00

=== Day 3 ===
Monday, 17 June 2019	Grenada	63–35	Dominica
07:00

Monday, 17 June 2019	Antigua and Barbuda	47–36	Dominica
18:00

Monday, 17 June 2019	Saint Vincent and the Grenadines	54–43	Grenada
19:30

=== Day 4 ===
Tuesday, 18 June 2019	Saint Lucia	63–28	Antigua and Barbuda
06:30

Tuesday, 18 June 2019	Saint Lucia	46–34	Dominica
18:00

Tuesday, 18 June 2019	Saint Vincent and the Grenadines	47–42	Antigua and Barbuda
19:30

=== Day 5 ===
Wednesday, 19 June 2019	Grenada	61–32	Dominica
06:30

Wednesday, 19 June 2019	Grenada	Draw^{1}	Saint Lucia
18.00

Wednesday, 19 June 2019	Saint Vincent and the Grenadines	59–29	Dominica
19:30

=== Day 6 ===
Thursday, 20 June 2019	Saint Vincent and the Grenadines	50–37	Antigua and Barbuda
06:30

Thursday, 20 June 2019	Saint Lucia	^{(Note 2)}	Antigua and Barbuda
18:00

Thursday, 20 June 2019	Saint Vincent and the Grenadines	54–57	Grenada
19:30

=== Day 7 ===
Friday, 21 June 2019	Saint Lucia	^{(Note 2)}	Dominica
06:00

Friday, 21 June 2019	Grenada	^{(Note 3)}	Antigua and Barbuda
7:30

Friday, 21 June 2019	Dominica	48–47	Antigua and Barbuda
17:00

Friday, 21 June 2019	Saint Vincent and the Grenadines	42–42	Saint Lucia
18:30

Notes

- ^1 On Day 5, the match between Grenada and Saint Lucia was abandoned due to rain. The match was declared a draw and the points were shared.
- ^2 Reports indicate that Saint Lucia won their Day 6 and Day 7 matches against Antigua and Barbuda and Dominica.
- ^3 Reports indicate that Grenada won their Day 7 match against Antigua and Barbuda.

== Final table ==
Pos	Team	P	W	L	D	GF	GA	GD	Pts
1	Grenada	8	6	1	1				13
2	Saint Vincent and the Grenadines	8	6	1	1	402	314	+88	13
3	Saint Lucia	8	4	2	2				10
4	Antigua and Barbuda	8	1	7	0				2
5	Dominica	8	1	7	0				2

== Award winners ==
=== Overall series ===
Award	Winner	Team
MVP of the Tournament	Lottisha Cato	Grenada
Most Accurate Shooter	Lottisha Cato	Grenada
Best Attacking Player	Shem Maxwell	Saint Lucia
Best Midcourt Player	Nerissa Delpesche	Saint Vincent and the Grenadines
Best Defensive Player	Joseann Antoine	Saint Vincent and the Grenadines
Best Attacking Team	Grenada	
Best Defensive Team	Saint Lucia	
Most Disciplined Team	Dominica	

=== Teams' Individual MVPs ===
Winner	Team
Amey Lake	Antigua and Barbuda
Aaliah Prince	Dominica
Tiffany Frederick	Grenada
Shem Maxwell	Saint Lucia
Joseann Antoine	Saint Vincent and the Grenadines
