= Bahamas national netball team =

National netball team

Bahamas
- Association: Bahamas Netball Federation
- Confederation: Americas Netball

Netball World Cup
- Appearances: 2 (Debuted in 1971)
- 1979 placing: 18th
- Best result: 9th (1971)

The Bahamas national netball team represented the Bahamas Netball Federation at the 1971 and 1979 World Netball Tournaments. They have also competed in the Caribbean Netball Championships. They hosted the 1977 tournament.

== Tournament history ==
=== Netball World Cup ===
Tournaments	Place
1971 World Netball Tournament	9th
1979 World Netball Tournament	18th

=== Caribbean Netball Championships ===
Tournaments	Place
1977 Caribbean Netball Championships	

== Notable players ==
=== Captains ===
Captains	Years
Winnifred Russell	1971
Florence Rolle	1979

== Head coaches ==
Coach	Years
Winnifred Russell	1979
