= ECCB International Netball Series =

International netball series organised by the Caribbean Netball Association

- Most recent season or competition: 2025 ECCB International Netball Series
- Sport: Netball
- First season: 2019
- Owner: Caribbean Netball Association
- Most recent champion: Saint Vincent and the Grenadines
- Most titles: Saint Vincent and the Grenadines (3 titles)
- Broadcaster: YouTube
- Sponsor: Eastern Caribbean Central Bank

The ECCB International Netball Series, also known as the OECS International Netball Series, is an international netball series organised by the Caribbean Netball Association. It features national netball teams from countries that are also members of the Eastern Caribbean Central Bank and/or Organisation of Eastern Caribbean States. The ECCB members play a series of test matches against each other. The winners are awarded the Gloria Ballantyne Championship Trophy. Grenada won the inaugural 2019 series and together with Saint Vincent and the Grenadines have been the series' most successful teams. The series has also featured guest national teams, usually other members of the Caribbean Netball Association, who play for World Netball Rankings points.

== History ==
=== New series ===
Between 1991 and 2018, the Caribbean Netball Association organised an ECCB/OECS Under-23 Netball tournament with the Eastern Caribbean Central Bank as its title sponsor. Saint Vincent and the Grenadines had won this tournament 14 times. Grenada and Saint Lucia won six titles each and Saint Kitts two. In June 2019, the under-23 tournament was replaced by the ECCB International Netball Series which would feature senior teams playing for valuable World Netball Rankings points. The winners of the new series would be awarded the Gloria Ballantyne Championship Trophy. Ballantyne was a former Saint Vincent and the Grenadines Netball Association and Caribbean Netball Association president, an administrator, umpire and Saint Vincent and the Grenadines captain and head coach. She passed away in June 2019. Saint Vincent and the Grenadines hosted the inaugural 2019 series which was won by Grenada.

== Series ==
=== Gloria Ballantyne Championship Trophy ===
Eastern Caribbean Central Bank member countries compete for the Gloria Ballantyne Championship Trophy.

Series	Winners	Runners up	3rd	4th
2019	Grenada	Saint Vincent and the Grenadines	Saint Lucia	Antigua and Barbuda
2022	Saint Vincent and the Grenadines	Saint Lucia	Antigua and Barbuda	Dominica
2023	Grenada	Saint Vincent and the Grenadines	Antigua and Barbuda	Dominica
2024	Saint Vincent and the Grenadines	Grenada	Saint Lucia	Antigua and Barbuda
2025	Saint Vincent and the Grenadines	Grenada	Saint Lucia	Antigua and Barbuda

=== Overall series winners ===
Guest teams, including Barbados and the Cayman Islands compete for World Netball Rankings points

Series	Winners	Runners up	3rd	4th
2022	Barbados	Saint Vincent and the Grenadines	Saint Lucia	Antigua and Barbuda
2023	Barbados	Grenada	Saint Vincent and the Grenadines	Cayman Islands
2024	Saint Vincent and the Grenadines	Grenada	Saint Lucia	Cayman Islands
2025	Saint Vincent and the Grenadines	Barbados	Grenada	Saint Lucia

== Participants ==
Team	(Saint Vincent and the Grenadines) 2019	(Dominica) 2022	(Antigua and Barbuda) 2023	(Saint Lucia) 2024	(Grenada) 2025
Anguilla	-	-	-	7th	6th
Antigua and Barbuda	4th	3rd	3rd	4th	4th
Barbados	-	^{1}	^{1}	-	^{1}
Cayman Islands	-	-	^{2}	^{2}	^{2}
Dominica	5th	4th	4th	5th	5th
Grenada	1st	-	1st	2nd	2nd
Guyana	-	-	-	-	^{3}
Montserrat	-	-	-	6th	7th
Saint Kitts and Nevis	-	5th	5th	-	-
Saint Lucia	3rd	2nd	6th	3rd	3rd
Saint Vincent and the Grenadines	2nd	1st	2nd	1st	1st

Notes

- ^1 Barbados were a guest team
- ^2 Cayman Islands were a guest team
- ^3 Guyana were a guest team
