= 1979 World Netball Tournament =

International netball tournament hosted by Trinidad and Tobago

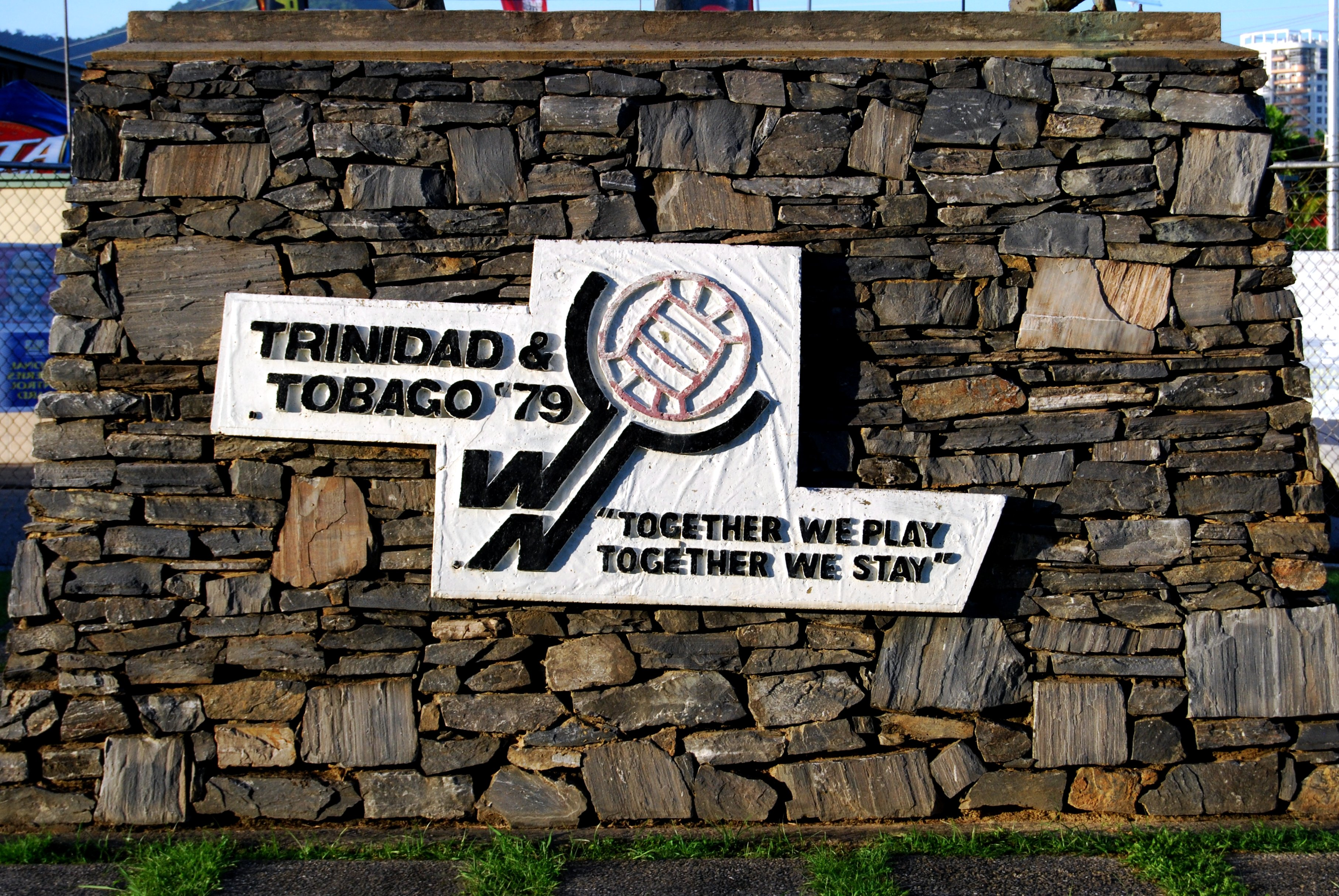

Tournament details
- Host country: Trinidad and Tobago
- City: Port of Spain
- Venue(s): West Regional Park Complex
- Dates: 13–25 August 1979
- Teams: 19

Final positions
- Champions: Australia; New Zealand; Trinidad and Tobago

Tournament statistics
- Matches played: 108

The 1979 World Netball Tournament was the fifth Netball World Cup. It featured 19 teams playing a series of netball test matches at the West Regional Park Complex in Port of Spain in August 1979. Of the 19 teams who participated, ten were making their debuts at the event. This was the most teams to have made their debut at a single tournament.

The tournament produced an historic, never-to-be-repeated result, with three teams sharing the title. In the 1st–10th classification stage, Australia, New Zealand and Trinidad and Tobago each won eight of their nine matches, each losing once to one of the other two first placed teams. New Zealand defeated Trinidad and Tobago 32–27, Trinidad and Tobago defeated Australia 40–38 and Australia defeated New Zealand 38–36. At the time, playoffs, goal difference or goal average were not used to determine an outright winner and the tournament organisers declared all three teams champions. This was Australia's 4th title, New Zealand's 2nd and Trinidad and Tobago's 1st. Trinidad and Tobago are the only team other than Australia and New Zealand to have won a Netball World Cup.

== Teams, head coaches and captains ==
Team	Head coach	Captain
Antigua and Barbuda		
Australia	Wilma Shakespear	Margaret Caldow
Bahamas	Winnifred Russell	Florence Rolle
Barbados	Maureen Alleyne	Marva Sealy
Bermuda	Marva Trott	June Dill
Canada	Avis Collins	
England	Joyce Wheeler	Patricia Watson
Grenada	Joline Whiteman	Joan Pivott
Republic of Ireland	Joanne Moles	Jane Digby
Jamaica	Jo Wigman	Brenda Khouri
Kenya	^{(Note 1)}	
New Zealand	Lois Muir	Lyn Gunson
Northern Ireland	Maureen Mawhinney	Sheelagh O'Prey
Saint Kitts and Nevis		Rosemary McMaster
Saint Lucia	Rumelia Elwin	Theresa Charles
Saint Vincent and the Grenadines	Gloria Ballantyne	Stella Boyea
Scotland	Moira Ord	Marie Fairie
Trinidad and Tobago	Lystra Lewis	Sherril Peters
Uganda	Ben Mary Muwanga	Suzan Ddumba Namatovu
Wales	Wendy White	

== Milestones ==
- Trinidad and Tobago's Jean Pierre played at her 5th and final tournament, making her the only player to have played in the first five World Netball Tournaments. The West Regional Park Complex, which hosted the 1979 World Netball Tournament, was subsequently re-named the Jean Pierre Complex in her honour.
- Trinidad and Tobago's Lystra Lewis was also coaching at her 5th and final tournament. Lewis also served as an umpire at these tournaments.

== Group stage ==
=== Group 1 ===
Pos	Team	P	W	D	L	GF	GA	GD	Pts
1	Australia	2	2	0	0	114	29	+85	4
2	Scotland	2	1	0	1	55	81	-26	2
3	Grenada	2	0	0	2	40	99	-59	0
4	Kenya ^{(Note 1)}	0	0	0	0	0	0	0	0

Monday, 13 August	Australia	55–15	Scotland

Tuesday, 14 August	Scotland	40–26	Grenada

Wednesday, 15 August	Australia	59–14	Grenada

=== Group 2 ===
Pos	Team	P	W	D	L	GF	GA	GD	Pts
1	England	3	3	0	0	179	73	+106	6
2	Saint Kitts and Nevis	3	2	0	1	95	113	-18	4
3	Uganda	3	1	0	2	91	138	-47	2
4	Canada	3	0	0	3	89	140	-41	0

Monday, 13 August	Saint Kitts and Nevis	33–31	Canada

Monday, 13 August	England	57–24	Uganda

Tuesday, 14 August	England	62–25	Canada

Tuesday, 14 August	Saint Kitts and Nevis	38–22	Uganda

Wednesday, 15 August	England	60–24	Saint Kitts and Nevis

Wednesday, 15 August	Uganda	45–43	Canada

=== Group 3 ===
Pos	Team	P	W	D	L	GF	GA	GD	Pts
1	New Zealand	3	3	0	0	151	80	+71	6
2	Barbados	3	2	0	1	109	110	-1	4
3	Antigua and Barbuda	3	1	0	2	112	140	-28	2
4	Saint Lucia	3	0	0	3	85	127	-42	0

Monday, 13 August	Barbados	50–39	Antigua and Barbuda

Monday, 13 August	New Zealand	48–27	Saint Lucia

Tuesday, 14 August	New Zealand	62–29	Antigua and Barbuda

Tuesday, 14 August	Barbados	35–30	Saint Lucia

Wednesday, 15 August	Antigua and Barbuda	44–28	Saint Lucia

Wednesday, 15 August	New Zealand	41–24	Barbados

=== Group 4 ===
Pos	Team	P	W	D	L	GF	GA	GD	Pts
1	Trinidad and Tobago	3	3	0	0	195	50	+145	6
2	Republic of Ireland	3	2	0	1	86	121	-35	4
3	Bermuda	3	1	0	2	69	130	-61	2
4	Bahamas	3	0	0	3	81	130	-49	0

Monday, 13 August	Bermuda	31–30	Bahamas

Monday, 13 August	Trinidad and Tobago	61–21	Republic of Ireland
16:00

Tuesday, 14 August	Republic of Ireland	29–26	Bermuda

Tuesday, 14 August	Trinidad and Tobago	63–17	Bahamas
17:30

Wednesday, 15 August	Trinidad and Tobago	71–12	Bermuda
16:15

Wednesday, 15 August	Republic of Ireland	36–34	Bahamas

=== Group 5 ===
Pos	Team	P	W	D	L	GF	GA	GD	Pts
1	Jamaica	3	3	0	0	114	83	+31	6
2	Wales	3	2	0	1	112	88	+24	4
3	Northern Ireland	3	1	0	2	86	124	-38	2
4	Saint Vincent and the Grenadines	3	0	0	3	95	112	-17	0

Monday, 13 August	Jamaica	33–28	Saint Vincent and the Grenadines

Monday, 13 August	Wales	41–23	Northern Ireland

Tuesday, 14 August	Jamaica	33–31	Wales

Tuesday, 14 August	Northern Ireland	39–35	Saint Vincent and the Grenadines

Wednesday, 15 August	Wales	40–32	Saint Vincent and the Grenadines

Wednesday, 15 August	Jamaica	48–24	Northern Ireland

Qualified for Group A: 1st–10th Classification
Qualified for Group B: 11th–19th Classification

== Group B: 11th–19th Classification ==
=== Round 1 ===
Thursday, 16 August	Bermuda	47–34	Bahamas

Thursday, 16 August	Antigua and Barbuda	51–37	Saint Vincent and the Grenadines

Thursday, 16 August	Canada	45–33	Uganda

Thursday, 16 August	Saint Lucia	44–39	Grenada

=== Round 2 ===
Friday, 17 August	Uganda	42–34	Northern Ireland

Friday, 17 August	Saint Vincent and the Grenadines	47–42	Canada

Friday, 17 August	Saint Lucia	38–31	Bermuda

Friday, 17 August	Antigua and Barbuda	56–41	Bahamas

=== Round 3 ===
Saturday, 18 August	Uganda	37–32	Bermuda

Saturday, 18 August	Grenada	54–26	Bahamas

Saturday, 18 August	Saint Lucia	39–36	Saint Vincent and the Grenadines

Saturday, 18 August	Northern Ireland	32–30	Canada

=== Round 4 ===
Monday, 20 August	Canada	47–46	Antigua and Barbuda

Monday, 20 August	Uganda	45–39	Bahamas

Monday, 20 August	Grenada	47–36	Saint Vincent and the Grenadines

Monday, 20 August	Northern Ireland	41–27	Bermuda

=== Round 5 ===
Tuesday, 21 August	Uganda	50–48	Antigua and Barbuda

Tuesday, 21 August	Grenada	37–27	Northern Ireland

Tuesday, 21 August	Saint Lucia	58–36	Bahamas

Tuesday, 21 August	Saint Vincent and the Grenadines	46–38	Bermuda

=== Round 6 ===
Wednesday, 22 August	Antigua and Barbuda	41–41	Grenada

Wednesday, 22 August	Saint Vincent and the Grenadines	39–27	Uganda

Wednesday, 22 August	Northern Ireland	39–30	Saint Lucia

Wednesday, 22 August	Canada	55–28	Bermuda

=== Round 7 ===
Thursday, 23 August	Saint Vincent and the Grenadines	38–34	Northern Ireland

Thursday, 23 August	Antigua and Barbuda	37–34	Saint Lucia

Thursday, 23 August	Grenada	42–35	Bermuda

Thursday, 23 August	Canada	56–37	Bahamas

=== Round 8 ===
Friday, 24 August	Bahamas	44–42	Saint Vincent and the Grenadines

Friday, 24 August	Saint Lucia	44–40	Uganda

Friday, 24 August	Canada	45–43	Grenada

Friday, 24 August	Antigua and Barbuda	49–36	Northern Ireland

=== Round 9 ===
Saturday, 25 August	Bahamas	35–31	Northern Ireland

Saturday, 25 August	Canada	45–43	Saint Lucia
	{{{goals1}}}		{{{goals2}}}

Saturday, 25 August	Antigua and Barbuda	57–36	Bermuda

Saturday, 25 August	Uganda	47–42	Grenada

=== Final table ===
Pos	Team	P	W	D	L	GF	GA	GD	Pts
11	Canada	8	6	0	2	365	310	+55	12
12	Antigua and Barbuda	8	5	1	2				11
13	Saint Lucia	8	5	0	3				10
14	Uganda	8	5	0	3				10
15	Grenada	8	4	1	3				9
16	Saint Vincent and the Grenadines	8	4	0	4				8
17	Northern Ireland	8	3	0	5				6
18	Bahamas	8	2	0	6				4
19	Bermuda	8	1	0	7				2

== Group A: 1st–10th Classification ==
=== Round 1 ===
Thursday, 16 August	Australia	64–14	Barbados

Thursday, 16 August	Trinidad and Tobago	84–13	Republic of Ireland
16:00

Thursday, 16 August	New Zealand	56–28	Jamaica

Thursday, 16 August	England	38–13	Saint Kitts and Nevis

Thursday, 16 August	Wales	44–25	Scotland
			Jane Elliot 16; Ann Murphy 9

=== Round 2 ===
Friday, 17 August	Jamaica	34–34	Saint Kitts and Nevis

Friday, 17 August	England	52–28	Wales

Friday, 17 August	New Zealand	95–7	Republic of Ireland

Friday, 17 August	Australia	61–33	Scotland

Friday, 17 August	Trinidad and Tobago	51–26	Barbados
16:45

=== Round 3 ===
Saturday, 18 August	Australia	76–17	Republic of Ireland

Saturday, 18 August	New Zealand	58–17	Scotland

Saturday, 18 August	Trinidad and Tobago	49–45	England
16:00

Saturday, 18 August	Jamaica	47–39	Barbados

Saturday, 18 August	Saint Kitts and Nevis	29–27	Wales

=== Round 4 ===
Monday, 20 August	Australia	71–22	Jamaica

Monday, 20 August	New Zealand	58–26	Saint Kitts and Nevis

Monday, 20 August	Trinidad and Tobago	56–20	Wales
17:30

Monday, 20 August	England	63–25	Republic of Ireland

Monday, 20 August	Barbados	54–42	Scotland

=== Round 5 ===
Tuesday, 21 August	New Zealand	53–36	England

Tuesday, 21 August	Australia	61–17	Wales

Tuesday, 21 August	Barbados	50–32	Republic of Ireland

Tuesday, 21 August	Trinidad and Tobago	51–20	Jamaica
17:30

Tuesday, 21 August	Saint Kitts and Nevis	40–38	Scotland

=== Round 6 ===
Wednesday, 22 August	Australia	38–36	New Zealand

Wednesday, 22 August	England	47–34	Jamaica

Wednesday, 22 August	Trinidad and Tobago	58–21	Saint Kitts and Nevis
17:30

Wednesday, 22 August	Barbados	34–26	Wales

Wednesday, 22 August	Scotland	42–30	Republic of Ireland

=== Round 7 ===
Thursday, 23 August	Trinidad and Tobago	40–38	Australia
16:00

Thursday, 23 August	England	57–24	Scotland

Thursday, 23 August	Jamaica	34–33	Wales

Thursday, 23 August	Saint Kitts and Nevis	68–23	Republic of Ireland

Thursday, 23 August	New Zealand	60–28	Barbados

=== Round 8 ===
Friday, 24 August	England	51–35	Barbados

Friday, 24 August	Jamaica	68–27	Republic of Ireland

Friday, 24 August	Australia	59–21	Saint Kitts and Nevis

Friday, 24 August	New Zealand	56–23	Wales

Friday, 24 August	Trinidad and Tobago	46–21	Scotland

=== Round 9 ===
Saturday, 25 August	Jamaica	57–44	Scotland

Saturday, 25 August	Barbados	43–40	Saint Kitts and Nevis

Saturday, 25 August	Wales	58–32	Republic of Ireland

Saturday, 25 August	Australia	54–37	England

Saturday, 25 August	New Zealand	33–27	Trinidad and Tobago
14:45

=== Final table ===
Pos	Team	P	W	D	L	GF	GA	GD	Pts
1st place, gold medalist(s)	Australia	9	8	0	1	522	237	+285	16
1st place, gold medalist(s)	New Zealand	9	8	0	1	505	230	+275	16
1st place, gold medalist(s)	Trinidad and Tobago	9	8	0	1	462	237	+225	16
4	England	9	6	0	3	438	305	+133	12
5	Jamaica	9	4	1	4	310	402	-92	9
6	Barbados	9	4	0	5	323	413	-90	8
7	Wales	9	3	0	6	276	379	-103	6
8	Saint Kitts and Nevis	9	2	1	6	292	378	-86	5
9	Scotland	9	1	0	8	286	447	-161	2
10	Republic of Ireland	9	0	0	9	204	599	-395	0

== Medallists ==
(gold) Gold	(gold) Gold	(gold) Gold
Australia; Coach: Wilma Shakespear	New Zealand; Coach: Lois Muir	Trinidad and Tobago; Coach: Lystra Lewis
Sharon Burton; Margaret Caldow (c); Betty Carroll; Gail Dorrington; Julie Francou; Terese Kennedy; Pam Redmond; Anne Sargeant; Gaye Teede; Yvonne Waters	Maxine Blomquist; Ruth Fathers; Margaret Forsyth; Lyn Parker (c); Janice Henderson; Margharet Kamana; Geane Katae; Leigh Mills; Millie Munro; Christine Pietzner; Lynn Proudlove; Yvonne Willering (vc)	Sherril Peters (c); Althea Luces; Jennifer Williams; Jean Pierre; Peggy Castanada; Cyrenia Charles; Ingrid Blackman; Angela Burke Browne; Veryl A Kretschmar; Heather Charleau; Marcia Simsoy Frank; Jennifer Nurse

== Notes ==
- ^1 Kenya withdrew before the tournament started.
