= Cayman Islands national netball team =

National netball team

Cayman Islands
- Association: Cayman Islands Netball Association
- Confederation: Americas Netball
- Head coach: Lyneth Monteith
- Captain: Katherine Gow
- World ranking: 35th
Team colours	Alternate

Netball World Cup
- Appearances: 4 (Debuted in 1991)
- 2003 placing: 24th
- Best result: 16th (1991)

The Cayman Islands national netball team represents the Cayman Islands Netball Association in international netball tournaments. They have featured at the World Netball Championships, AFNA Championships and in Netball World Cup Qualifiers. They have also played as a guest team in both the Europe Netball Open Challenge and the ECCB International Netball Series. As of 1 September 2026, the Cayman Islands are listed 35th on the World Netball Rankings.

== Tournament history ==
=== Major tournaments ===
==== Netball World Cup ====
Tournaments	Place
1991 World Netball Championships	16th
1995 World Netball Championships	21st
1999 World Netball Championships	23rd
2003 World Netball Championships	24th

=== Americas tournaments ===
==== Caribbean, AFNA Championships ====
In 1977, the Cayman Islands made their first appearance at the Caribbean Netball Championships. In 1988 they hosted the tournament.

Tournaments	Place
1977 Caribbean Netball Championships	
1978 Caribbean Netball Championships	
1984 Caribbean Netball Championships	11th
1985 Caribbean Netball Championships	11th
1986 Caribbean Netball Championships	
1988 Caribbean Netball Championships	
1989 Caribbean Netball Championships	
1990 Caribbean Netball Championships	12th
1994 AFNA Championships	
2014 AFNA Championships	6th ^{1}

==== Netball World Cup qualifiers ====
Tournaments	Place
2014 AFNA Championships	6th ^{1}
2023 Netball World Cup Regional Qualifier – Americas	8th

Notes

- ^1 2014 AFNA Championships also counted as a 2015 Netball World Cup qualifier.

==== ECCB International Netball Series ====
Since 2023, Cayman Islands have played in the ECCB International Netball Series as a guest team playing for World Netball Rankings points.

Tournaments	Place
2023 ECCB International Netball Series	
2024 ECCB International Netball Series	
2025 ECCB International Netball Series	

==== Central American and Caribbean Games ====
Tournaments	Place
2023 Central American and Caribbean Games	5th

=== Europe Netball Open Challenge ===
Tournaments	Place
2019 Netball Europe Open Challenge	6th
2022 Europe Netball Open Challenge	6th

== Notable players ==
=== 2023 squad ===
This recent squad was selected for the 2023 Central American and Caribbean Games.

Cayman Islands national netball team roster
Players
Coaches

Name	Pos	DOB	Height	Club	Nat	Caps
Kathryn Corkish	GS, GA		–
Charlotte Dowell	GK, GD		–
Alexcina Fraser	GS, GA		–
Micah Leon	WA, C		–
Shiyan McField	WA, C		–
Naihma Ordones Miller	C, WD, GD		–
Shanti Singh	WA, GS, GA		–
Di'Jhaney Valentine	GK, GD		–
Atira White			–
Leah White	WA, GS		–
Rose Wilson	GS, GA		–

Head coach

- Lyneth Monteith

Notes

- (c) – Captain
- (cc) – Co-captain
- (vc) – Vice-captain
- – Injury / maternity leave
- (TRP) – Temporary Replacement Player

=== Captains ===
Captains	Years
Molly Ann Moore	1985
Christine Burke	1986
Merta Day	1990
Lyneth Monteith	1991
Katherine Gow	202x–
Aryana Grant	2022

== Head coaches ==
Coach	Years
Valree Ayton	1978
Jean Pierre	1991, 1999
Walter Dalton	1995
Lyneth Monteith	2003–
