= Tonisha Rock-Yaw =

Barbadian netball player

Personal information
- Born: 20 August 1993 (age 32) Bridgetown
- Occupation: netball player
- Height: 1.78 m (5 ft 10 in)

Netball career
- Playing position(s): centre, wing defense

Tonisha Rock-Yaw (born 20 August 1993) is a Barbadian netball player who represents Barbados internationally and plays in the positions of centre and wing defense. She made her maiden World Cup appearance representing Barbados at the 2019 Netball World Cup. She also represented Barbados at the 2018 Commonwealth Games, which also marked her maiden Commonwealth Games appearance.
