= 1983 World Netball Tournament =

International netball tournament hosted by Singapore

Tournament details
- Host country: Singapore
- City: Kent Ridge
- Venue: National University of Singapore
- Dates: 11–24 June 1983
- Teams: 14

Final positions
- Champions: Australia (5th title)
- Runners-up: New Zealand
- Third place: Trinidad and Tobago

Tournament statistics
- Matches played: 63

The 1983 World Netball Tournament was the sixth Netball World Cup. It was organised by the International Federation of Netball Associations. It featured 14 teams playing a series of netball test matches in Singapore in June 1983. With a team coached by Joyce Brown and captained by Julie Francou, Australia won the tournament after winning all of their nine matches. In the tournament deciding match, they defeated New Zealand 47–42. In New Zealand, the match was broadcast live on Television One. New Zealand finished in second and Trinidad and Tobago came in third.

== Teams, head coaches and captains ==
Team	Head coach	Captain
Antigua and Barbuda		
Australia	Joyce Brown	Julie Francou
Canada	Avis Collins	
England	Irene Beagles	Jillean Hipsey
Hong Kong	Shirley Langrope	
Jamaica	Barbara Robinson Sinclair	Brenda Khouri
Malaysia	K. Munap	
New Zealand	Lois Muir	Lyn Parker
Northern Ireland	Mary French	Elizabeth Rodgers
Scotland	Agnes O'Brien	
Singapore	Bette Allison	Yap Hui Kim
Sri Lanka		Ulrica Barr; Kumarakula Singhe
Trinidad and Tobago	Enid Browne; Jean Pierre	Sherril Peters
Wales	Jennifer Sealey	

== Group A ==
=== Matches ===
Round 1

Saturday, 11 June	Jamaica	67–17	Canada
17:15

Saturday, 11 June	New Zealand	85–4	Hong Kong
17:30

Saturday, 11 June	Northern Ireland	43–23	Sri Lanka
17:30

Round 2

Monday, 13 June	Sri Lanka	38–18	Hong Kong
15:45

Monday, 13 June	New Zealand	45–42	Jamaica
16:00

Monday, 13 June	England	68–12	Canada
16:00

Round 3

Tuesday, 14 June	England	48–42	Jamaica
17:15

Tuesday, 14 June	New Zealand	75–12	Canada
17:30

Tuesday, 14 June	Northern Ireland	52–11	Hong Kong
17:30

Round 4

Wednesday, 15 June	Canada	52–30	Sri Lanka
15:45

Wednesday, 15 June	England	58–10	Hong Kong
16:00

Wednesday, 15 June	Jamaica	48–19	Northern Ireland
16:00

Round 5

Friday, 17 June	New Zealand	63–22	Northern Ireland
17:15

Friday, 17 June	England	73–10	Sri Lanka
17:30

Friday, 17 June	Canada	46–30	Hong Kong
17:30

Round 6

Saturday, 18 June	New Zealand	76–19	Sri Lanka

Saturday, 18 June	England	60–14	Northern Ireland

Saturday, 18 June	Jamaica	95–14	Hong Kong

Round 7

Monday, 20 June	New Zealand	51–36	England
	Rhonda Meads 38; Margharet Matenga 13		Christine Maylor 26; Jillean Hipsey 10

Monday, 20 June	Northern Ireland	53–35	Canada

Monday, 20 June	Jamaica	91–29	Sri Lanka

=== Table ===
Pos	Team	Pld	W	D	L	GF	GA	GD	Pts
1	New Zealand	6	6	0	0	395	135	+260	12
2	England	6	5	0	1	343	139	+204	10
3	Jamaica	6	4	0	2	385	172	+213	8
4	Northern Ireland	6	3	0	3	203	240	–37	6
5	Canada	6	2	0	4	174	324	–150	4
6	Sri Lanka	6	1	0	5	149	352	–203	2
7	Hong Kong	6	0	0	6	87	374	–287	0

Qualified for 1st–4th Classification
Qualified for 5th–8th Classification
Qualified for 9th–14th Classification

== Group B ==
=== Matches ===
Round 1

Saturday, 11 June	Singapore	42–42	Malaysia
15:45

Saturday, 11 June	Australia	51–16	Scotland
16:00

Saturday, 11 June	Trinidad and Tobago	54–18	Wales
16:00

Round 2

Monday, 13 June	Trinidad and Tobago	54–19	Scotland
17:15

Monday, 13 June	Australia	58–26	Wales
17:30

Monday, 13 June	Antigua and Barbuda	53–22	Singapore
17:30

Round 3

Tuesday, 14 June	Trinidad and Tobago	59–19	Malaysia
15:45

Tuesday, 14 June	Wales	38–34	Scotland
16:00

Tuesday, 14 June	Australia	60–17	Antigua and Barbuda
16:00

Round 4

Wednesday, 15 June	Wales	40–29	Antigua and Barbuda
17:15

Wednesday, 15 June	Scotland	59–19	Malaysia
17:30

Wednesday, 15 June	Australia	73–12	Singapore
17:30

Round 5

Friday, 17 June	Scotland	47–16	Singapore
15:45

Friday, 17 June	Australia	81–16	Malaysia
16:00	{{{goals1}}}		{{{goals2}}}

Friday, 17 June	Trinidad and Tobago	40–18	Antigua and Barbuda
16:00

Round 6

Saturday, 18 June	Antigua and Barbuda	60–28	Malaysia
17:15

Saturday, 18 June	Australia	57–25	Trinidad and Tobago
17:30	{{{goals1}}}		{{{goals2}}}

Saturday, 18 June	Wales	60–31	Singapore
17:30

Round 7

Monday, 20 June	Wales	65–22	Malaysia
15:45

Monday, 20 June	Scotland	40–40	Antigua and Barbuda
16:00

Monday, 20 June	Trinidad and Tobago	46–24	Singapore
16:00

=== Table ===
Pos	Team	Pld	W	D	L	GF	GA	GD	Pts
1	Australia	6	6	0	0	380	112	+268	12
2	Trinidad and Tobago	6	5	0	1	278	155	+123	10
3	Wales	6	4	0	2	247	228	+19	8
4	Scotland	6	2	1	3	215	218	–3	5
5	Antigua and Barbuda	6	2	1	3	217	230	–13	5
6	Singapore	6	0	1	5	147	321	–174	1
7	Malaysia	6	0	1	5	146	366	–220	1

Qualified for 1st–4th Classification
Qualified for 5th–8th Classification
Qualified for 9th–14th Classification

== 9th–14th Classification ==
=== Matches ===
Round 1

Tuesday, 21 June	Malaysia	48–34	Sri Lanka
16:00

Tuesday, 21 June	Canada	45–45	Singapore
17:15

Tuesday, 21 June	Antigua and Barbuda	46–24	Hong Kong
18:45

Round 2

Wednesday, 22 June	Antigua and Barbuda	62–25	Sri Lanka
16:00

Wednesday, 22 June	Canada	57–37	Malaysia
18:45

Wednesday, 22 June	Singapore	44–27	Hong Kong
18:45

Round 3

Friday, 24 June	Malaysia	49–37	Hong Kong

Friday, 24 June	Antigua and Barbuda	57–28	Canada

Friday, 24 June	Singapore	56–43	Sri Lanka

=== Final table ===
Pos	Team	P	W	D	L	GF	GA	GD	Pts
9	Antigua and Barbuda	5	5	0	0	232	103	+129	10
10	Canada	5	3	1	1	228	199	+29	7
11	Singapore	5	2	2	1	209	210	–1	6
12	Malaysia	5	2	1	2	155	193	–38	5
13	Sri Lanka	5	1	0	4	170	236	–66	2
14	Hong Kong	5	0	0	5	75	128	–53	0

== 5th–8th Classification ==
=== Matches ===
Round 1

Tuesday, 21 June	Jamaica	56–26	Scotland
17:30

Tuesday, 21 June	Northern Ireland	43–31	Wales
16:00

Round 2

Wednesday, 22 June	Jamaica	64–25	Northern Ireland
16:00

Wednesday, 22 June	Wales	37-50	Scotland
18:45

Round 3

Friday, 24 June	Jamaica	67–29	Wales

Friday, 24 June	Scotland	45–31	Northern Ireland

=== Final table ===
Pos	Team	P	W	D	L	GF	GA	GD	Pts
5	Jamaica	3	3	0	0	187	80	+107	6
6	Scotland	3	1	0	2	108	137	–29	2
7	Wales	3	1	0	2	110	147	–37	2
8	Northern Ireland	3	1	0	2	99	140	–41	2

== 1st–4th Classification ==
=== Matches ===
Round 1

Tuesday, 21 June	Australia	54–41	England
15:30

Tuesday, 21 June	New Zealand	35–30	Trinidad and Tobago
17:15

Round 2

Wednesday, 22 June	Australia	38–32	Trinidad and Tobago
15:45

Wednesday, 22 June	New Zealand	55–34	England
17:15

Round 3

Friday, 24 June	Trinidad and Tobago	43–40	England

Friday, 24 June	Australia	47–42	New Zealand
17:15

=== Final table ===
Pos	Team	P	W	D	L	GF	GA	GD	Pts
1st place, gold medalist(s)	Australia	3	3	0	0	139	115	+24	6
2nd place, silver medalist(s)	New Zealand	3	2	0	1	132	111	+21	4
3rd place, bronze medalist(s)	Trinidad and Tobago	3	1	0	2	105	113	–8	2
4	England	3	0	0	3	115	152	–37	0

== Final placings ==
Place	Nation
1st place, gold medalist(s)	Australia
2nd place, silver medalist(s)	New Zealand
3rd place, bronze medalist(s)	Trinidad and Tobago
4	England
5	Jamaica
6	Scotland
7	Northern Ireland
8	Wales
9	Antigua and Barbuda
10	Canada
11	Singapore
12	Malaysia
13	Sri Lanka
14	Hong Kong

== Medallists ==
Gold	Silver	Bronze
Australia; Coach: Joyce Brown	New Zealand; Coach: Lois Muir	Trinidad and Tobago; Coach: Enid Browne; Jean Pierre
Diane Cleveland; Julie Francou (c); Chris Harris; Sue Hawkins; Dianne McDonald; Jill McIntosh; Kav Partington; Anne Sargeant; Jane Searle; Karan Smith	Rita Fatialofa; Tracey Fear; Margaret Forsyth; Leigh Gibbs; Margharet Matenga; Rhonda Meads; Lyn Parker (c); Lynn Proudlove; Waimarama Taumaunu; Yvonne Willering	Naomi Babb; Jeanne Bailey; Sharon Blake; Peggy Castanada; Heather Charleau; Jennifer Frank; Marcia Frank; Maria Lewis; Bridget Mitchell; Grace Parkinson; Sherril Peters (c); Hazel Taylor
