= Canada national netball team =

National netball team

- Association: Netball Canada
- Confederation: Americas Netball
- World ranking: 25th
| Team Colours | Alternate |

Netball World Cup
- Appearances: 7 (Debuted in 1979)
- 2003 placing: 21st
- Best result: 6th (1991)

Commonwealth Games
- Appearances: 2 (Debuted in 1998)
- 2002 placing: 8th
- Best result: 8th (2002)

The Canada national netball team has represented Netball Canada in international netball tournaments such as the Netball World Cup and Netball at the Commonwealth Games. They have also represented Canada at the World Games. More recently Canada has played in the Netball Singapore Nations Cup. As of 1 March 2026, Canada are listed 25th on the World Netball Rankings.

== Tournament history ==
=== Major tournaments ===
==== Netball World Cup ====
| Tournaments | Place |
|---|---|
| 1979 World Netball Tournament | 11th |
| 1983 World Netball Tournament | 12th |
| 1987 World Netball Tournament | 10th |
| 1991 World Netball Championships | 6th |
| 1995 World Netball Championships | 13th |
| 1999 World Netball Championships | 13th |
| 2003 World Netball Championships | 21st |

==== World Games ====
| Tournaments | Place |
|---|---|
| 1993 World Games | 5th |

==== Commonwealth Games ====
| Tournaments | Place |
|---|---|
| 1998 Commonwealth Games | 9th |
| 2002 Commonwealth Games | 8th |

=== Americas tournaments ===
| Tournaments | Place |
|---|---|
| 1997 AFNA Championships | 9th |
| 2006 AFNA Championships | 4th ^{1} |
| 2010 AFNA World Netball Championship qualifiers | 6th |
| 2008 AFNA Championships | 6th |
| 2012 AFNA Championships | 5th |
| 2014 AFNA Championships | 4th ^{2} |
| 2018 AFNA Championships | 5th ^{3} |

Notes

- ^1 The 2006 AFNA Championships also counted as a 2007 World Netball Championships Qualifier.
- ^2 The 2014 AFNA Championships also counted as a 2015 Netball World Cup Qualifier.
- ^3 The 2018 AFNA Championships also counted as a 2019 Netball World Cup Qualifier.

=== Invitational tournaments ===
==== Netball Singapore Nations Cup ====
Canada have regularly played in the Netball Singapore Nations Cup tournaments. Their 2023 and 2024 teams were coached by Jill McIntosh.

| Tournaments | Place |
|---|---|
| 2006 Netball Singapore Nations Cup | 4th |
| 2007 Netball Singapore Nations Cup | 5th |
| 2009 Netball Singapore Nations Cup | 3rd |
| 2016 Netball Singapore Nations Cup | 6th |
| 2023 Netball Singapore Nations Cup | 4th |
| 2024 Netball Singapore Nations Cup | 6th |

==== Battle of the Isles ====
In October 2025, Canada played in and won the 2025 Battle of the Isles series, playing against Sint Maarten, British Virgin Islands, Sint Eustatius, Guadeloupe and Bermuda. The series win saw Canada move up 17 places from 47th to 30th in the World Netball Rankings.

| Tournaments | Place |
|---|---|
| 2025 Battle of the Isles | 1st |

== Notable players ==
=== 2025–26 squad ===
Canada roster
Players
Coaches

| Name | Pos | DOB | Height | Club | Nat | Caps |
|---|---|---|---|---|---|---|
| Holly Butterworth | GD, WD | | – | British Columbia |
| Katrina Dang | WA, C, WD | | – | British Columbia |
| Amonda Francis | GK, GD | | – | British Columbia |
| Holly Hancock | WA, WD, C | | – |
| Terrian Julien | GK, GD | | – |
| Michelle Kao | C, WA, WD | | – | British Columbia |
| Jacqueline Kelly | WA, GA, GS | | – |
| Sarah Kerbrat | GA, GS | | – |
| Ladonna Lamonth | GS, GK | | – |
| Adrienne Parkin | GA, GS | | – | British Columbia |

Head coach

- ??

Notes

- (c) – Captain
- (cc) – Co-captain
- (vc) – Vice-captain
- – Injury / maternity leave
- (TRP) – Temporary Replacement Player

=== Captains ===
| Captains | Years |
|---|---|
| Sharon Butler | 2002 |
| Dulcina Wind | 2002 |
| Sabrina Versteeg | 2009 |

== Head coaches ==
| Coach | Years |
|---|---|
| Avis Collins | 1979, 1983 |
| Ann Willcocks | 1983–20xx |
| Jill McIntosh | 2023–2024 |
