= Shonette Azore-Bruce =

Barbadian netball player

Personal information
- Born: 8 July 1982 (age 44)
- Occupation: netball player
- Height: 1.85 m (6 ft 1 in)

Netball career
- Playing positions: goal defense, goal keeper

Shonette Azore-Bruce also simply known as Shonette Azore (born 8 July 1982) is a Barbadian netball player who represents Barbados internationally and plays in the positions of goal defense and goal keeper. She competed at the Netball World Cup on four occasions in 1999, 2011, 2015 and 2019. She also represented Barbados at the Commonwealth Games in 2014 and 2018.
