= Damisha Croney =

Barbadian netball player

Personal information
- Born: 3 November 1991 (age 34) Bridgetown
- Occupation: netball player
- Height: 1.72 m (5 ft 7 1/2 in)

Netball career
- Playing positions: wing attack, centre

Damisha Croney (born 3 November 1991) is a Barbadian netball player who represents Barbados internationally and plays in the positions of wing attack and centre. She competed at the Netball World Cup on two occasions in 2011 and 2019. She also represented Barbados at the Commonwealth Games in 2010, 2014 and in 2018.
