= Netball Jamaica =

Netball governing body

- Sport: Netball
- Jurisdiction: Jamaica
- Founded: 1958
- Affiliation: World Netball; Americas Netball; Caribbean Netball Association; Jamaica Olympic Association
- Headquarters: Suite 9 National Arena
- Location: Kingston, Jamaica

Official website
- www.netballjamaica.com.jm

Netball Jamaica is the main governing body for netball in Jamaica. It was founded in 1958 as the Jamaica Netball Association. It is affiliated to World Netball, Americas Netball, the Caribbean Netball Association and the Jamaica Olympic Association. It is responsible for organising and administering the Jamaica national netball team and the Netball Jamaica Elite League.

== History ==
Netball Jamaica was originally formed in 1958 as the Jamaica Netball Association by Pancho Rankine, Margaret Beckford and Margarietta St. Juste. In 1959 it became a member of the West Indies Netball Board and an associate member of the All England Netball Association. It was subsequently invited to send a team to the West Indies Netball Championship in Montserrat in August 1959. Jamaica made their Test debut at this tournament. In 2013, the JNA was rebranded as Netball Jamaica.

== Presidents ==
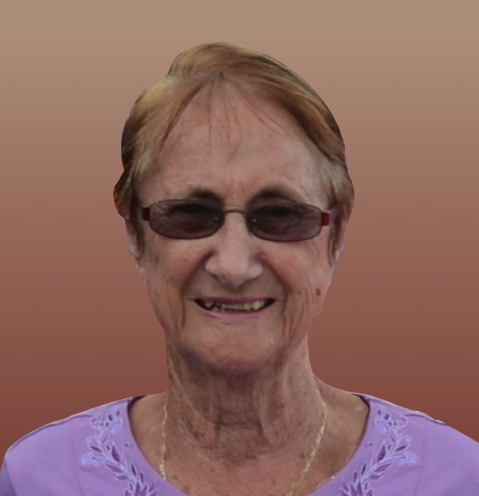
Margaret Beckford, the first president of Netball Jamaica, serving from 1958 to 1960.

| President | Years |
|---|---|
| Margaret Beckford | 1958–1960 |
| Leila Robinson | 1960–1965 |
| Fay Mills | 1965–1966 |
| Leila Robinson | 1966–1979 |
| Barbara Jones | 1979–1982 |
| Vilma McDonald | 1982–1983 |
| Avril Crawford | 1983–1985 |
| Molly Rhone | 1993–2003 |
| Sharon Donaldson | 2003–2005 |
| Marva Bernard | 2005–2015 |
| Paula Daley Morris | 2015–2020 |
| Tricia Robinson | 2020–2025 |
| Karen Rosen Baugh | 2025– |
