= Antigua and Barbuda national netball team =

National netball team

Antigua and Barbuda
- Nickname(s): Wadadli Girls
- Association: Antigua and Barbuda Netball Association
- Confederation: Americas Netball
- Head coach: Jamila Fitz
- Asst coach: Sanchez Martin
- Manager: Sanchez Martin
- Captain: Tanya Green
- World ranking: 47th
Team colours	Alternate

Netball World Cup
- Appearances: 4 (Debuted in 1979)
- 2003 placing: 17th
- Best result: 9th (1983)

The Antigua and Barbuda national netball team represents the Antigua and Barbuda Netball Association in international netball tournaments. They featured at the 1979, 1983, 1995 and the 2003 World Netball Championships. More recently, Antigua and Barbuda has played in the ECCB International Netball Series and the 2023 Netball World Cup Qualifiers. As of 1 December 2025, Antigua and Barbuda are listed 47th on the World Netball Rankings.

== Tournament history ==
=== Netball World Cup ===
Tournaments	Place
1979 World Netball Tournament	12th
1983 World Netball Tournament	9th
1995 World Netball Championships	12th
2003 World Netball Championships	17th

=== Netball World Cup Qualifiers ===
Tournaments	Place
2006 AFNA Championships	5th
2023 Netball World Cup Regional Qualifier – Americas	9th

=== AFNA Championships ===
Tournaments	Place
1997 AFNA Championship	8th
2006 AFNA Championships	5th

=== ECCB International Netball Series ===
Tournaments	Place
2019 ECCB International Netball Series	4th
2022 ECCB International Netball Series	3rd
2023 ECCB International Netball Series	3rd
2024 ECCB International Netball Series	4th
2025 ECCB International Netball Series	4th

== Notable players ==
=== 2025 squad ===
This recent squad was selected for the 2025 ECCB International Netball Series.

Antigua and Barbuda national netball team roster
Players
Coaches

Name	Pos	DOB	Height	Club	Nat	Caps
Anayjah Anthony	WD, GD, C		–
Erverdine Parker Barnarde	GS, GA		–
Jonelly Encarnacion	C, WD, WA		–
Viola Francis	C, WD, GD		–
Tanya Green (c)	GK, GD		–
Kendiesha Greenaway			–
Shernice Henry	GD		–
Xandea Hobson			–
Kizzy Hughes	C, WD, WA		–
Tyea Ladoo	WD, GD, GK		–
Christina Lloyd	GS, GA		–
Shi-Anna Payne	GS, GA		–
Rayana Regis	GS, GK, GD		–
Charmaine Wetherill	C, WD, WA		–

Head coach

- Jamila Fitz

Assistant coach

- Sanchez Martin
  Medical Support:
  Justin Joseph

Notes

- (c) – Captain
- (cc) – Co-captain
- (vc) – Vice-captain
- – Injury / maternity leave
- (TRP) – Temporary Replacement Player

=== Captains ===
Captains	Years
Karen Joseph	1990–2003
Amey Lake	2023
Tanya Green	2025

== Coaches ==
=== Head coaches ===
Coach	Years
Anna Shepard	1995, 2003
Lisa Smith	2022
Karen Joseph	2023
Sanchez Martin	2024
Jamila Fitz	2025
