= Brianna Holder =

Barbadian netball player

Personal information
- Born: 20 June 2001 (age 25)
- Occupation: netball player
- Height: 1.68 m (5 ft 6 in)

Netball career
- Playing positions: goal attack, goal shooter

Brianna Holder (born 20 June 2001) is a Barbadian netball player who represents Barbados internationally and plays in the positions of goal attack and goal shooter. She made her maiden World Cup appearance representing Barbados at the 2019 Netball World Cup. In April 2022 she acted as a batonbearer when the Queen's Baton visited her island ahead of the Birmingham Commonwealth Games.
