= Americas Netball =

Netball governing bodies in the Americas

- Region: Americas
- President: Marva Bernard
- americasnetball.org

Americas Netball, previously known as the Americas Federation of Netball Associations, is the main governing body for netball in the Americas. It is affiliated to World Netball and covers a total of fifty-four countries. The Americas Region currently has 1 Associate Member and 15 Full Regional and World Netball Members. The current president of the AFNA is Marva Bernard.

== Competitions ==
Years	Competition
1997–2018	AFNA Championships
2007–	Netball World Cup Qualifiers – Americas

== Members ==
Full Members

Team	Association
Anguilla	
Antigua and Barbuda	Antigua and Barbuda Netball Association
Argentina	Netball Argentina
Barbados	Barbados Netball Association
British Virgin Islands	Netball BVI
Bermuda	Bermuda Netball Association
Canada	Netball Canada
Cayman Islands	Cayman Islands Netball
Dominica	Dominica Netball Association
Grenada	Grenada Netball Association
Guadeloupe	Guadeloupe Netball Association
Jamaica	Netball Jamaica
Saint Kitts and Nevis	Saint Kitts and Nevis Netball Association
Saint Lucia	Netball St Lucia
Saint Vincent and the Grenadines	Saint Vincent and the Grenadines Netball Association
Sint Eustatius	St Eustatius Netball Association
Sint Maarten	St Maarten Netball Association
Trinidad and Tobago	Trinidad and Tobago Netball Association
United States	USA Netball

Associate Members

Team	Association
Dominican Republic	Netball Republica Dominicana
Venezuela	Federación Venezolana Netball

Other netball nations

Team	Association
Aruba	
(The Bahamas) Bahamas	
Bonaire	
Chile	
Cuba	
Curaçao	
Guyana	
Haiti	
Montserrat	
Paraguay	
Peru	
(Saba (island)) Saba	
(Turks and Caicos Islands) Turks and Caicos	
Uruguay	
(United States Virgin Islands) US Virgin Islands	
