= Saint Vincent and the Grenadines national netball team =

National netball team

Saint Vincent and the Grenadines
- Nickname(s): Vincy Jewels
- Association: Saint Vincent and the Grenadines Netball Association
- Confederation: Americas Netball
- Head coach: Natasha Baptiste
- Co-captains: Shellisa Davis; Mary-Ann Frederick
- World ranking: 18th
Team colours	Alternate

Netball World Cup
- Appearances: 3 (Debuted in 1979)
- 2003 placing: 13th
- Best result: 10th (1995)

Commonwealth Games
- Appearances: 1 (Debuted in 2006)
- Best result: 11th (2006)

The Saint Vincent and the Grenadines national netball team represents the Saint Vincent and the Grenadines Netball Association in international netball tournaments. They featured at the 1979, 1995 and the 2003 World Netball Championships and the 2006 Commonwealth Games. More recently, Saint Vincent and the Grenadines have played in the ECCB International Netball Series, 2023 Netball World Cup Qualifiers and the 2023 Central American and Caribbean Games. As of 1 March 2026, Saint Vincent and the Grenadines are listed 18th on the World Netball Rankings.

== World Netball Rankings ==
In 2008, Saint Vincent and the Grenadines were featured in the initial World Netball Rankings, listed 12th. They are the highest-ranked team in the Eastern Caribbean and they regularly compete with Barbados for third place in the Americas Netball region with only Jamaica and Trinidad and Tobago ranked higher.

== Tournament history ==
=== Major tournaments ===
==== Netball World Cup ====
Tournaments	Place
1979 World Netball Tournament	16th
1995 World Netball Championships	10th
2003 World Netball Championships	13th

==== Commonwealth Games ====
Tournaments	Place
2006 Commonwealth Games	11th

=== Americas tournaments ===
==== West Indies, Caribbean, AFNA Championships ====
Saint Vincent and the Grenadines were among the pioneering national netball teams in the Caribbean and West Indies. In 1954, together with Trinidad and Tobago and Grenada, they played in a triangular tournament. These tournaments subsequently evolved into the West Indies Netball Championship, the Caribbean Netball Championship and eventually the AFNA Championships. Saint Vincent and the Grenadines hosted tournaments in 1960, 1978, 1994, 2005 and 2008. In both 1992 and 1993, Saint Vincent and the Grenadines, Barbados and Trinidad and Tobago finished as joint winners. In 1998 they were outright winners. They qualified for the 2006 Commonwealth Games after winning the 2005 tournament.

Tournaments	Place
1954 West Indies Netball Championship	
1960 West Indies Netball Championship	
1978 Caribbean Netball Championships	
1984 Caribbean Netball Championships	2nd ^{1}
1985 Caribbean Netball Championships	2nd
1992 Caribbean Netball Championships	1st ^{2}
1993 Caribbean Netball Championships	1st ^{2}
1994 AFNA Championships	2nd
1997 AFNA Championship	3rd
1998 AFNA Championship	1st
2005 AFNA Championships	1st ^{3}
2006 AFNA Championships	3rd ^{4}
2008 AFNA Championships	5th
2018 AFNA Championships	4th ^{5}

==== Netball World Cup qualifiers ====
Tournaments	Place
2006 AFNA Championships	3rd ^{4}
2010 AFNA World Netball Championship qualifiers	5th
2018 AFNA Championships	4th ^{5}
2023 Netball World Cup Regional Qualifier – Americas	4th

- ^1 In 1984, Saint Vincent and the Grenadines and Barbados finished as joint runners-up.
- ^2 In both 1992 and 1993, Saint Vincent and the Grenadines, Barbados and Trinidad and Tobago finished as joint winners.
- ^3 The 2005 AFNA Championships also counted as a 2006 Commonwealth Games qualifier.
- ^4 The 2006 AFNA Championships also counted as a 2007 World Netball Championships qualifier.
- ^5 The 2018 AFNA Championships also counted as a 2019 Netball World Cup qualifier.

==== ECCB International Netball Series ====
Since 2019, Saint Vincent and the Grenadines have played in the ECCB International Netball Series. They are one the series' most successful teams.

Tournaments	Place
2019 ECCB International Netball Series	2nd
2022 ECCB International Netball Series	1st
2023 ECCB International Netball Series	2nd
2024 ECCB International Netball Series	1st
2025 ECCB International Netball Series	1st

==== Central American and Caribbean Games ====
Tournaments	Place
2023 Central American and Caribbean Games	3rd

== Notable players ==
=== 2025 squad ===
This recent squad was selected for the 2025 ECCB International Netball Series.

Saint Vincent and the Grenadines national netball team roster
Players
Coaches

Name	Pos	DOB	Height	Club	Nat	Caps
Keleshia Barbour			–
Kaywanna Charles	GK, GD		–
Kristiana Christopher	GS, GA		–
Annicia Dallaway	GS, GA		–
Shellisa Davis (cc)	WA, GS, GA		–
Shanique De Shong	GS, GA		–
Mary-Ann Frederick (cc)	GS, GA		–
Phiunza La Borde			–
Kyila Miller	C, WA		–
Shania Pompey	WA, GD		–
Jueneka Quow	GK, GD		–
Rosannia Stephens	C		–

Head coach

- Natasha Baptiste
  Team Manager:
  Juovanie Charles-Roberts
  Primary Care Provider:
  Javed Marksman
  Masseuse:
  Javon Edwards

Notes

- (c) – Captain
- (cc) – Co-captain
- (vc) – Vice-captain
- – Injury / maternity leave
- (TRP) – Temporary Replacement Player

=== Captains ===
Captains	Years
Stella Boyea	1979
Stephanie Boyce	1985
Dellarice Duncan	2003, 2006
Skiddy Francis-Crick	2008
Gailene Gordon	2010
Nicole Sandy-Stevenson	2018
Mary-Ann Frederick	2019
Vasha Adams	2022
Ruthann Williams	2022
Kaywanna Charles	2023
Kimesha Antoine	2024
Shellisa Davis	2025
Mary-Ann Frederick	2025

== Coaches ==
=== Head coaches ===
Coach	Years
Gloria Ballantyne	1979
Genita Lewis	1995
Godfrey Harry	2003, 2006, 2010
Dellarice Duncan	2008
Moeth Gaymes	2018
Vasha Adams	2019
O'Neil Cockburn	2022
Godfrey Harry	2022
Vasha Adams	2023
Natasha Baptiste	2024, 2025

== Honours ==
- West Indies, Caribbean, AFNA Championships
  - Winners: 1992, 1993, 1998, 2005
  - Runners Up: 1984, 1985, 1994
- ECCB International Netball Series
  - Winners: 2022, 2024, 2025
  - Runners Up: 2019, 2023
