= Grenada national netball team =

National netball team

Grenada
- Nickname(s): Spice Girls
- Association: Netball Grenada
- Confederation: Americas Netball
- World ranking: 24th
Team colours	Alternate

Netball World Cup
- Appearances: 2 (Debuted in 1979)
- 2003 placing: 20th
- Best result: 15th (1979)

The Grenada national netball team represents Netball Grenada in international netball tournaments. They featured at the 1979 and the 2003 World Netball Championships. In 2016, Grenada were invited to enter the Netball Europe Open Challenge. They finished as overall winners after winning all five of their matches. More recently, Grenada played in the ECCB International Netball Series and 2023 Netball World Cup Qualifiers. As of 1 March 2026, Grenada are listed 24th on the World Netball Rankings.

== Tournament history ==
=== Early tournaments ===
Grenada was among the pioneering national netball teams in the Caribbean and West Indies. In 1954, Grenada played in a triangular tournament with Trinidad and Tobago and Saint Vincent and the Grenadines.

=== Major tournaments ===
==== Netball World Cup ====
Tournaments	Place
1979 World Netball Tournament	15th
2003 World Netball Championships	20th

=== Americas tournaments ===
==== Netball World Cup Qualifiers ====
Tournaments	Place
2014 AFNA Championships	5th^{1}
2018 AFNA Championships	3rd^{1}
2023 Netball World Cup Regional Qualifier – Americas	5th

==== AFNA Championships ====
Tournaments	Place
1997 AFNA Championship	5th
2012 AFNA Championships	6th
2014 AFNA Championships	5th^{1}
2018 AFNA Championships	3rd^{1}

Notes

- ^1 The 2014 and 2018 AFNA Championships also served as Netball World Cup qualifiers.

==== ECCB International Netball Series ====
Since 2019, Grenada has played in the ECCB International Netball Series. They won the inaugural series and in 2023 were winners again.

Tournaments	Place
2019 ECCB International Netball Series	1st
2023 ECCB International Netball Series	1st
2024 ECCB International Netball Series	2nd
2025 ECCB International Netball Series	2nd

=== Netball Europe Open Challenge ===
In 2016, Grenada were invited to enter the Netball Europe Open Challenge. They finished as overall winners after winning all five of their matches.

Tournaments	Place
2016 Netball Europe Open Challenge	1st

== Notable players ==
=== Captains ===
Captains	Years
Joan Pivott	1979
Janice Celestine	1988
Cecile Roberts	2019
Denise Cameron	2019

== Coaches ==
=== Head coaches ===
Coach	Years
Joline Whiteman	1979
Veda Bruno	1988
Pauline St John	2003
Oberon Pitterson	2018
Kathy-Ann Gabriel	2019

=== Technical director ===
Coach	Years
Oberon Pitterson	2016–2017

== Honours ==
- Netball Europe Open Challenge
  - Winners: 2016
- ECCB International Netball Series
  - Winners: 2019, 2023
  - Runners Up: 2024, 2025
