= Saint Lucia national netball team =

National netball team

Saint Lucia
- Association: Netball Saint Lucia
- Confederation: Americas Netball
- Head coach: Shem Maxwell
- Asst coach: Donna Lynn Joseph
- Co-captains: Melika Destang; Jermia Martial
- World ranking: 31st
Team colours

Netball World Cup
- Appearances: 2 (Debuted in 1979)
- 2003 placing: 16th
- Best result: 13th (1979)

Commonwealth Games
- Appearances: 1 (Debuted in 2014)
- Best result: 12th

The Saint Lucia national netball team represents Netball Saint Lucia in international netball tournaments. They featured at the 1979 and 2003 World Netball Championships and the 2014 Commonwealth Games. More recently, Saint Lucia have played in the ECCB International Netball Series and 2023 Netball World Cup Qualifiers. As of 1 March 2026, Saint Lucia are listed 31st on the World Netball Rankings.

== Tournament history ==
=== Major tournaments ===
==== Netball World Cup ====
Tournaments	Place
1979 World Netball Tournament	13th
2003 World Netball Championships	16th

==== Commonwealth Games ====
Between 2012 and 2015, Connie Francis served as head coach of Saint Lucia, helping them qualify for the 2014 Commonwealth Games. This was their debut appearance in the tournament.

Tournaments	Place
2014 Commonwealth Games	12th

=== Americas tournaments ===
==== Netball World Cup Qualifiers ====
Tournaments	Place
2010 AFNA World Netball Championship qualifiers	4th
2023 Netball World Cup Regional Qualifier – Americas	7th

==== AFNA Championships ====
Tournaments	Place
1997 AFNA Championships	6th
2008 AFNA Championships	4th
2012 AFNA Championships	4th

==== ECCB International Netball Series ====
Since 2019, Saint Lucia have played in the ECCB International Netball Series. Saint Lucia hosted the 2024 series.

Tournaments	Place
2019 ECCB International Netball Series	3rd
2022 ECCB International Netball Series	2nd
2023 ECCB International Netball Series	6th
2024 ECCB International Netball Series	3rd
2025 ECCB International Netball Series	3rd

==== Central American and Caribbean Games ====
Tournaments	Place
2026 Central American and Caribbean Games	3rd

== Notable players ==
=== 2025 squad ===
This recent squad was selected for the 2025 ECCB International Netball Series.

Saint Lucia national netball team roster
Players
Coaches

Name	Pos	DOB	Height	Club	Nat	Caps
Verne Alexander	WA, C, WD		–
Jo-Ann Anderson	WA, GS, GA		–
Melika Destang (cc)	GS, GA, WA, C		–
Lizzy Dorvius	GK, GD, WD, C		–
Aaliyah Estephor	WA, C, WD		–
Lerkisha Felix	WA, C, WD		–
Naija Ferdinand	WD, C, GA, GS		–
Semaj Marguerite	GA		–
Jermia Martial (cc)	GD, GK, WD		–
Tamara Samuel	GK, GD, WD, C		–
Patrina Wilson	GK, GD, WD, C		–

Head coach

- Shem Maxwell

Assistant coach

- Donna Lynn Joseph

Physiotherapist: Eva Stanislaus
Team Manager/Trainer:
Donald Dave Albert

Notes

- (c) – Captain
- (cc) – Co-captain
- (vc) – Vice-captain
- – Injury / maternity leave
- (TRP) – Temporary Replacement Player

=== Captains ===
Captains	Years
Theresa Charles	1979
Shem Maxwell	2014
Safiya Paul	2024
Melika Destang	2025
Jermia Martial	2025

== Coaches ==
=== Head coaches ===
Coach	Years
Rumelia Elwin	1979
Jennifer King	2003
Connie Francis	2012–2015
Minneth Reynolds	2022
Connie Francis	2024
Shem Maxwell	2025

== Honours ==
- ECCB International Netball Series
  - Runners Up: 2022
