= Rebecca Chaplow =

New Zealand netball player

Personal information
- Full name: Rebecca Chaplow (nee: Faulkner)
- Born: 19 August 1942 (age 84)
- Height: 1.63 m (5 ft 4 in)
- Spouse: David Chaplow

Netball career
- Playing positions: C, WA
Years	National team	Caps
1963	New Zealand	4
Medal record
Representing New Zealand
World Netball Tournament
Silver medal – second place	1963 Eastbourne	Tournament

Rebecca Chaplow (née Faulkner; born 19 August 1942), also known as Ripeka Chaplow, is a former New Zealand netball international. She played four international matches for New Zealand at the 1963 World Netball Tournament, where they finished second to Australia. She was inducted into the Māori Sports Hall of Fame in 2006.

== Early life ==
Chaplow was born Rebecca Faulkner on 19 August 1942. Of Māori descent, she affiliates to Ngāi Te Rangi, Te Arawa, Tainui, and Ngāi Tūhoe, and came from Matapihi, a suburb of Tauranga in the Bay of Plenty region. In 1963, she was photographed by Gregory Riethmaier for a book titled Rebecca and the Maoris, in which she is seen going about her daily life in the Māori community. Judged against modern criteria, the book has been criticised for its patronising approach.

== Netball career ==
A mid-court player, Faulkner played representative netball for Rotorua from 1962, and was named in the North Island team after the 1963 national netball championships.

Faulkner was a member of the New Zealand team at the 1963 World Netball Tournament, travelling with the team by ship, and spending three months away from New Zealand. She made her debut in the first-round match against Northern Ireland, becoming the 31st player to be selected for the team. At the tournament, she played in four of the New Zealand team's ten matches in the round-robin tournament, facing tough competition from Pamela Edmonds for the centre position. New Zealand recorded nine wins and one loss, 36–37 against Australia, finishing as runners-up.

In the 1970s, Chaplow was a coach for the Eastern Bay of Plenty netball team.

== Later life ==
Chaplow trained as a nurse. In 1968, she met her husband, David Chaplow, who was a doctor, in Whakatāne, and the couple went on to have four children, including artist Arohanoa Mathews. David Chaplow went on to serve as the director of mental health for 10 years to 2011, and was appointed a Companion of the Queen's Service Order, for public services, in the 2001 New Year Honours.

Rebecca Chaplow worked in psychiatric court liaison, before completing a diploma in mental health and a diploma in management. In the 1980s, she worked at a psychiatric hospital in Australia before returning to New Zealand to work at the Mason Clinic, a secure psychiatric hospital in Auckland, and later for the Waikato District Health Board Māori mental health services. She then joined the Māori Health Directorate, part of the Ministry of Health, as a senior advisor.

Chaplow was inducted into the Māori Sports Hall of Fame in 2006. She sometimes uses the Māori form of her forename, and is thus also known as Ripeka Chaplow.
