= Lesley Harris =

New Zealand netball player

Personal information
- Full name: née: Baker
- Born: 8 October 1938 (age 88)
- Height: 1.70 m (5 ft 7 in)
- Spouse: Graham Harris

Netball career
- Playing positions: WD, GD
Years	National team	Caps
1963	New Zealand	5
Medal record
Representing New Zealand
World Netball Tournament
Silver medal – second place	1963 Eastbourne	Tournament

Lesley Harris (born 8 October 1938) is a former New Zealand netball international who represented New Zealand at the inaugural 1963 World Netball Tournament

Lesley Harris (née Baker) was born on 8 October 1938 and lived in Matamata in the Waikato region of New Zealand's North Island. She married Graham Harris who taught at Matamata College. She played wing defence for the Matamata netball team and was chosen to represent New Zealand in the 1963 World Netball Tournament. Her first match for the Silver Ferns was against Sri Lanka and she played in half of the team's games, being in competition with Elva Simpson for a place on the team. New Zealand finished runners-up, after losing 37-36 to Australia.
