= Lystra Lewis =

Trinidad and Tobago netball coach, umpire and administrator

Lystra Lewis MBE
Personal information
- Born: 1924 Woodbrook, Port of Spain, Trinidad
- Died: 4 July 2009 (aged 85) Port of Spain General Hospital
- School: Tranquillity Girls' Intermediate School
- University: Bedford College

Netball career
Years	Club team	Apps
1930–1944	Malvern Sports Club	
Coaching career
- Years: Team
- 1952–1979: Trinidad and Tobago

Lystra Lewis MBE (1924 – 4 July 2009) was a pioneering netball coach, umpire and administrator. In 1960, she was a founding member of the International Federation of Women's Basketball and Netball Associations, later to become World Netball. In 1963 she was made a member of the Order of the British Empire. Between 1963 and 1979, she served as the Trinidad and Tobago head coach at five World Netball Tournaments. Lewis also served as an umpire at these tournaments. In 1979 she was head coach of the Trinidad and Tobago team that shared the gold medal with Australia and New Zealand. She later served as president of the Americas Federation of Netball Associations and help launch both the Caribbean Netball Association and the United States of America Netball Association.

== Early life, family and education ==
Lewis was born in 1924 in Woodbrook, Port of Spain. She was the fifth of six children and was active in sport from an early age, taking part in netball, cricket, table tennis and athletics. She attended the Tranquillity Girls' Intermediate School.

== Playing career ==
As a youth, Lewis played netball for Tranquillity Girls' Intermediate School. Between 1930 and 1944, she was a member of Malvern Sports Club. By the time Lewis was 13, she began recruiting young girls to play on the Malvern netball team.

== Administrator ==
In 1945, Lewis was the Secretary and Treasurer of the Port of Spain Netball League. In 1954, she was a founding member of the West Indies Netball Board. In 1960 she represented the board at the meeting in Colombo, Ceylon that established the International Federation of Women's Basketball and Netball Associations. Between 1960 and 1961 she studied physical education at Bedford College after receiving a scholarship from the British Council. During this time she became the first West Indian to be appointed to the All England Netball Association's panel of umpires. In 1961, after returning to Trinidad, she helped introduce netball to schools in Trinidad and Tobago. In 1962, she was the driving force behind building the first official netball court in Trinidad at the Princess Building Grounds, Port of Spain. It now forms part of the Lystra Lewis Netball Courts. In 1963 Lewis founded the West Indies Netball Association, in 1974 she helped form the Caribbean Netball Association. She also served as an executive member of the International Federation of Netball Associations. In 1992, while serving as president of the Americas Federation of Netball Associations, Lewis helped launch the United States of America Netball Association and attended their inaugural meeting. By 1993, USANA had hosted its first national championship. Lewis returned to present the Lystra Lewis Trophy to the winner.

== Coaching career ==
=== Trinidad and Tobago ===
Lewis first coached the Trinidad and Tobago national netball team in 1952. Competitive netball among Caribbean and West Indies countries started in 1954 with a triangular tournament featuring Trinidad and Tobago, Saint Vincent and the Grenadines and Grenada. In 1954, Lewis was instrumental in establishing the West Indies Netball Board in an effort to formalise these early West Indies Netball Championships. Between 1963 and 1979, Lewis served as head coach of Trinidad and Tobago at five World Netball Tournaments. Lewis also served as an umpire at these tournaments. In 1979 she was head coach of the Trinidad and Tobago team that shared the gold medal with Australia and New Zealand.

Tournaments	Place
1963 World Netball Tournament	4th
1967 World Netball Tournament	6th
1971 World Netball Tournament	4th
1975 World Netball Tournament	4th
1979 World Netball Tournament	1st place, gold medalist(s)

=== Seminars ===
Lewis regularly organised netball coaching seminars and clinics for players, coaches and umpires throughout the Caribbean. This saw her travel to Antigua and Barbuda, Barbados, British Virgin Islands, Dominica, Guyana, Montserrat, Saint Kitts and Nevis and Saint Vincent and the Grenadines. She introduced a system to train and test umpires in the region, to enable countries to have qualified personnel.

== Death and funeral ==
On Saturday, 4 July 2009, aged 85, Lewis passed away at the Port of Spain General Hospital. The Ministry of Sport and Youth Affairs, the Trinidad and Tobago Olympic Committee and an editorial in the Trinidad and Tobago Guardian all acknowledged her significant contribution to the development of netball in Trinidad and Tobago. At her funeral service on 8 July 2009 at St Crispin's Anglican Church in Woodbrook, Port of Spain, Canon Knolly Clarke gave the homily and Molly Rhone was one of several people to pay tribute. The mourners included notable Trinidad and Tobago politicians, Joan Yuille-Williams and Donna Cox, and Trinidad and Tobago sports administrators, Jack Warner and Deryck Murray, as well as past and present members of the Trinidad and Tobago national netball team, including the then captain, Rhonda John-Davis.

== Legacy ==
- The Lystra Lewis Port of Spain Netball League is named after her.
- The Lystra Lewis Netball Courts are located within Nelson Mandela Park in St Clair, Port of Spain.

== Honours ==
=== Coaching career ===
Trinidad and Tobago

- World Netball Tournament
  - Winners: 1979

Individual Awards

Year	Award
1963	Order of the British Empire
1969	Public Service Medal of Merit
1987	World Netball Service Award
