= Belinda Charteris =

New Zealand netball player

Belinda Charteris MNZM
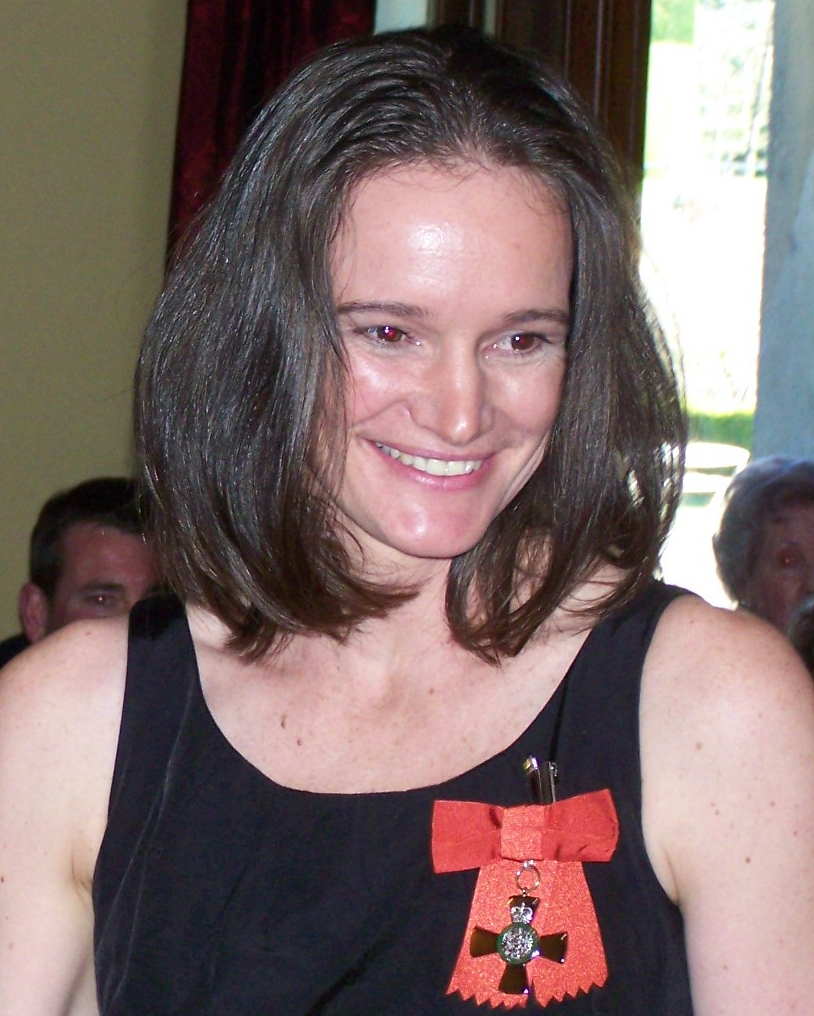
- Charteris in 2009

Personal information
- Full name: Belinda Jane Charteris (Née: Blair)
- Born: 10 May 1972 (age 54) Christchurch, New Zealand
- Height: 1.81 m (5 ft 11 in)
- Relative: Judy Blair (mother)

Netball career
- Playing position: GD
Years	Club team	Apps
?–2004	Canterbury Flames	
Years	National team	Caps
1994–2002	New Zealand	53
Medal record
Representing New Zealand
World Netball Championships
Silver medal – second place	1999 Christchurch	Tournament
Bronze medal – third place	1995 Birmingham	Tournament
Commonwealth Games
Silver medal – second place	1998 Kuala Lumpur	Team competition

Belinda Jane Charteris MNZM (née Blair; born 10 May 1972) is a New Zealand former international netball representative, who played in the Silver Ferns team that won a silver medal at the 1998 Commonwealth Games in Kuala Lumpur. She also played for the Canterbury Flames in the National Bank Cup, retiring after the 2004 season. In the 2009 Queen's Birthday Honours, Charteris was appointed a Member of the New Zealand Order of Merit, for services to netball.

Her mother is Judy Blair, who captained the Silver Ferns in 1967.
