= Jean Pierre (netball) =

Trinidad and Tobago netball player, coach and politician

Personal information
- Full name: Eugenia Theodosia Pierre
- Born: 26 March 1944 Fyzabad, Trinidad
- Died: 2 December 2002 (aged 58) Cayman Islands
- Occupation: High school teacher
- University: Dartford College of Physical Education; St. Thomas University

Netball career
- Playing position: GS
Years	National team	Caps
1963–1979	Trinidad and Tobago	
Coaching career
- Years: Team
- 1983, 1987: Trinidad and Tobago
- 1987: West Indies
- 1987–1999: Cayman Islands
Medal record
Representing Trinidad and Tobago
Netball World Cup
Gold medal – first place	1979 Port of Spain	Team

Jean Pierre (26 March 1944 – 2 December 2002) was a former Trinidad and Tobago netball international, netball coach and politician. Between 1963 and 1979, she represented Trinidad and Tobago at five Netball World Cups. She captained Trinidad and Tobago at the 1975 World Netball Tournament. In 1979 she was a member of the Trinidad and Tobago team that shared the gold medal with Australia and New Zealand. She was subsequently awarded the Hummingbird Medal, Trinity Cross and Chaconia Medals. Between 1991 and 1995, she served in the Trinidad and Tobago House of Representatives for Port of Spain South as a member of the People's National Movement. Between 1991 and 1995 she also served as the Minister of Sport and Youth Affairs. She died on 2 December 2002 in the Cayman Islands after a long battle with colorectal cancer.

== Early life and education ==
Jean Pierre was born on 26 March 1944 in Fyzabad, Trinidad. She attended various schools in Trinidad and Tobago including Southern Oropouche Government Primary School, Mucurapo Girls’ R.C. School and the Progressive Educational Institute. She subsequently gained a diploma in physical education from Dartford College of Physical Education and a Bachelor of Arts in Sports Administration from St. Thomas University in Miami, Florida.

== Netball career ==
=== Playing career ===
==== Trinidad and Tobago ====
Between 1963 and 1979, she represented Trinidad and Tobago at five Netball World Cups. She was known as the "Dancing Queen" because of her rapid and graceful movements on the netball court. She also holds the distinction of being the only player to compete in the first five Netball World Cups. She captained Trinidad and Tobago at the 1975 World Netball Tournament. In 1979 she was a member of the Trinidad and Tobago team that shared the gold medal with Australia and New Zealand. For her contribututions to netball in Trinidad and Tobago she was subsequently awarded the Hummingbird Medal, Trinity Cross and Chaconia Medals, all by age 35.

Tournaments	Place
1963 World Netball Tournament	4th
1967 World Netball Tournament	6th
1971 World Netball Tournament	4th
1975 World Netball Tournament	4th
1979 World Netball Tournament	1st place, gold medalist(s)

=== Coaching career ===
==== Trinidad and Tobago ====
At the 1983 and 1987 World Netball Tournament, Pierre was a member of the Trinidad and Tobago coaching team. Enid Browne was listed as the head coach at both of these tournaments.

==== West Indies ====
In November 1987, Pierre coached a West Indies team that played England in a three test series. The West Indies won first test 46–39.

==== Cayman Islands ====
From 1987 onwards, Pierre coached the Cayman Islands, including at the 1991 and 1999 World Netball Championships. She was still working as a coach in the Cayman Islands when she died on 2 December 2002, after a long battle with colorectal cancer.

Tournaments	Place	Team
1983 World Netball Tournament	3rd place, bronze medalist(s)	Trinidad and Tobago
1987 World Netball Tournament	2nd place, silver medalist(s)	Trinidad and Tobago
1987 England West Indies series		West Indies
1990 Caribbean Netball Championship		Cayman Islands
1991 World Netball Championships	16th	Cayman Islands
1999 World Netball Championships	23rd	Cayman Islands

== Political career ==
Between 1991 and 1995, Pierre served in the House of Representatives for Port of Spain South as a member of the People's National Movement. Between 1991 and 1995 she also served as Trinidad and Tobago's Minister of Sport and Youth Affairs.

== Legacy ==
- In 1998 the Caribbean Netball Association introduced the Jean Pierre Caribbean Youth Netball Tournament in her honour. The inaugural tournament was hosted by Antigua and Barbuda and won by Jamaica. The tournament has been held almost annually ever since.
- The West Regional Park Complex on Wrightson Road in Port of Spain, which hosted the 1979 World Netball Tournament, was re-named the Jean Pierre Complex in her honour.
- In 1990 Pierre was one the founding members of the All Sectors Netball League. Since 2003, teams in the league have competed for the Jean Pierre Challenge Trophy.

== Honours ==
Trinidad and Tobago

- Netball World Cup
  - Winners: 1979

Individual Awards

Year	Award
1974	Hummingbird Medal
1979	Trinity Cross
1979	Chaconia Medal
