= Colleen Falloon =

New Zealand netball player

Personal information
- Full name: Colleen Natalie Falloon (née: McMaster)
- Born: 10 July 1943 (age 83)
- Height: 1.70 m (5 ft 7 in)
- Spouse: Neil Francis Falloon (m. 1971; died 2006)
- School: Christchurch West High School

Netball career
- Playing positions: GA, GS
Years	National team	Caps
1960–63	New Zealand	11
Medal record
Representing New Zealand
World Netball Tournament
Silver medal – second place	1963 Eastbourne	Tournament

Colleen Natalie Falloon (née McMaster; born 10 July 1943) is a former New Zealand netball international. She played 11 international matches for New Zealand between 1960 and 1963, including at the 1963 World Netball Tournament. More recently she has been active in Masters athletics, winning multiple national marathon titles, in the W60, W65, W70 and W75 categories.

== Early life ==
Falloon was born Colleen Natalie McMaster on 10 July 1943. She was educated at Christchurch West High School, and went on to study at Christchurch Teachers' College.

== Netball career ==
McMaster began playing representative netball for Canterbury in 1959, and was described as "one of the outstanding players" at that year's national netball championships, where she gained South Island honours.

In 1960, McMaster was selected for the New Zealand team that toured Australia, and was the youngest member of the touring party. She played in 12 of the 16 games on tour, mostly at goal attack, including in two of the three Test matches. In the first Test match in Adelaide, New Zealand achieved their first ever victory over Australia, winning 49–40. McMaster was omitted from the second Test team, with Betty Steffensen being preferred at goal attack. The game was won by Australia, 44–39, and McMaster returned for the third Test, won 46–45 by Australia.

McMaster was a member of the New Zealand team at the 1963 World Netball Tournament. At the tournament, New Zealand recorded nine wins and one loss, 36–37 against Australia, to finish as runners-up. In the game against England, won by New Zealand 56–29, McMaster played at goal shooter and was reported as "working accurately and in perfect unison" with goal attack Judy Blair.

Across her international career, McMaster played in 11 Test matches.

== Later life ==
McMaster was a schoolteacher. In 1971, she married Neil Francis Falloon, a mechanical engineer, and the couple went on to have two children. They lived at Muriwai, where Neil Falloon was active in surf lifesaving, as a competitor who won national titles, a referee, and manager of representative teams. He served as district president and district president for Surf Life Saving Northern Region, and was president of the Muriwai Surf Life Saving Club at the time of his death on 7 March 2006.

Colleen Falloon took up distance running, and by 2012 had run 82 marathons. She was second in the W60 category of the New Zealand national marathon championships in 2004, and won the event in 2006 and 2008. In 2013, she won the W65 category, and in 2014 and 2015 she finished second in the W70 division. She then won the W70 national marathon title in 2016, 2017 and 2018. In 2021, she won the W75 national marathon championship.
