= Judy Blair (netball) =

New Zealand netball player

Judy Blair MNZM
Personal information
- Full name: Judith Ann Blair (Née: Dunlop)
- Born: 29 November 1941 (age 84)
- Height: 1.63 m (5 ft 4 in)
- Spouse: Kevin Richard Blair
- Relative: Belinda Charteris (daughter)
- School: Linwood High School

Netball career
- Playing positions: GA, GS, WA
Years	National team	Caps
1960–1967	New Zealand	19
Medal record
Representing New Zealand
World Netball Tournament
Gold medal – first place	1967 Perth	Tournament
Silver medal – second place	1963 Eastbourne	Tournament

Judith Ann Blair MNZM (née Dunlop; born 29 November 1941) is a former New Zealand netball international. She played 19 international matches for the New Zealand team between 1960 and 1967, including captaining the side to victory at the 1967 World Netball Tournament.

== Early life ==
Blair was born Judith Ann Dunlop on 29 November 1941, the daughter of Ernest and Monica Daphne Dunlop. She was educated at Linwood High School in Christchurch. After leaving school, she found employment as a leather worker.

== Netball career ==
Dunlop began playing representative netball for Canterbury in 1956, and first gained South Island selection in 1958. In 1959, it was said that "although short, she moves well into the circle and is outstandingly quick on rebounds. She is a most unselfish player, and although an accurate shot herself, passes well to the goal shooter."

In June 1960, Dunlop became engaged to Kevin Richard Blair, and later that year she was selected for the New Zealand team that toured Australia. She played in 14 of the 16 games on tour, including in all three Test matches, and was considered to be one of the most improved players in the team. Her play on tour as goal shooter was described as "outstanding". In the first Test match in Adelaide, New Zealand achieved their first ever victory over Australia, winning 49–40. However, the second and third Tests of the series were won by Australia, 44–39 and 46–45, respectively.

By the 1963 World Netball Tournament, Dunlop had married, and was known by her married name. At the tournament, New Zealand recorded nine wins and one loss, 36–37 against Australia, to finish as runners-up. In the game against England, won by New Zealand 56–29, Blair played at goal attack and was reported as "working accurately and in perfect unison" with goal shooter Colleen McMaster. After the disappointment of narrowly finishing second, Blair gave birth to her first child but continued playing netball, moving positions to wing attack where her explosive speed and deception were ideal. She was named as captain of the New Zealand team for the 1967 World Netball Tournament, where New Zealand won all seven of their matches to become world champions for the first time.

Across her international career, Blair played in 19 Test matches, and she was unbeaten as captain. After retiring, she remained involved in netball, and received a coaching certificate in 1975.

== Later life ==
In 1972, Blair gave birth to her daughter Belinda, who would also go on to play netball for New Zealand. They were the first mother and daughter to represent New Zealand in netball.

The 1967 World Netball Tournament team was inducted into the New Zealand Sports Hall of Fame in 1996. In the 2006 Queen's Birthday Honours, Blair was appointed a Member of the New Zealand Order of Merit, for services to netball. In 2024, she was an inaugural inductee to the Netball New Zealand Hall of Fame.
