= 2027 Netball World Cup =

International netball tournament in Australia

Tournament details
- Host country: Australia
- City: Sydney
- Dates: 25 August – 5 September 2027

The 2027 Netball World Cup will be the seventeenth staging of the Netball World Cup, the premier competition in international netball, contested every four years. The tournament will be held in Sydney, Australia.

== Host selection ==
- Australia

Netball Australia announced their interest to bid as early as June 2019, saying they promise the best netball event ever seen. They officially made an application for the competition on 30 June 2020, with the slogan all for 2027.

Sydney's bid was the only one that applied. On 26 April 2021, Sydney was confirmed as hosts for the third time.

== Venue ==
The primary venue will be the Qudos Bank Arena in Sydney. There is also potential that other places around New South Wales could host games.

| 2027 Netball World Cup is located in Australia | Sydney |
|---|---|
| 2027 Netball World Cup is located in Australia | Qudos Bank Arena |
| 2027 Netball World Cup is located in Australia | Capacity: 18,000 (netball) |

== Qualification ==
Sixteen teams took part for the sixth time since qualifiers were introduced in 2007. Alongside hosts Australia, five teams qualified via ranking on 4 December 2025. The remaining ten spots will be decided by the five continental qualifiers, with the top two teams in each qualifier making the World Cup. Qualification took place between August and October 2026.

=== Returnees ===
- Hong Kong returns after last taking part in 2003.
- Samoa returns after missing out in 2023.

=== Absentees ===
- Sri Lanka failed to qualify for the first time since 2007.
- Fiji weren't present for the first time since 1995.

=== Qualified teams ===
| Qualification | Host | Dates | Vacancies | Qualified |
|---|---|---|---|---|
| Host nation | – | 21 April 2021 | 1 | Australia |
| World Netball Rankings | – | 4 December 2025 | 5 | New Zealand; Jamaica; England; South Africa; Uganda |
| Asia Qualifier | Hong Kong | 8–15 August 2026 | 2 | Singapore; Hong Kong |
| Oceania Qualifier | (Tonga) Nukuʻalofa | 14–18 September 2026 | 2 | Samoa; Tonga |
| Africa Qualifier | (Kenya) Nairobi | 19–26 September 2026 | 2 | Malawi; Namibia |
| Europe Qualifier | (Scotland) Glasgow | 25–27 September 2026 | 2 | Scotland; Northern Ireland |
| Americas Qualifier | (Barbados) Bridgetown | 19–26 October 2026 | 2 | Saint Vincent and the Grenadines; Trinidad and Tobago |

=== Summary of qualified teams ===
| Team | Qualification method | Date of qualification | Appearance(s) | | | | Previous best performance (Note: Bold text indicates they hosted that edition.) | WR (Note: World ranking at start of tournament.) |
| Team | Qualification method | Date of qualification | Total | First | Last | Streak | Previous best performance | WR |
|---|---|---|---|---|---|---|---|---|
| Australia | Host nation | 21 April 2021 | 17th | 1963 | 2023 | 17 | Champions (Twelve times) (Note: Australia have won in 1963, 1971, 1975, 1979, 1983, 1991, 1995, 1999, 2007, 2011, 2015 and 2023.) | TBD |
| New Zealand | World Netball Rankings | 4 December 2025 | 17th | 1963 | 2023 | 17 | Champions (1967, 1979, 1987, 2003, 2019) | TBD |
| Jamaica | World Netball Rankings | 4 December 2025 | 17th | 1963 | 2023 | 17 | Third place (1991, 2003, 2007, 2023) | TBD |
| England | World Netball Rankings | 4 December 2025 | 17th | 1963 | 2023 | 17 | Runners-up (1975, 2023) | TBD |
| South Africa | World Netball Rankings | 4 December 2025 | 11th | 1963 | 2023 | 9 | Runners-up (1995) | TBD |
| Uganda | World Netball Rankings | 4 December 2025 | 5th | 1979 | 2023 | 4 | Fifth place (2023) | TBD |
| Singapore | Asia Qualifier | 14 August 2026 | 12th | 1967 | 2023 | 9 | Eighth place (1967) | TBD |
| Hong Kong | Asia Qualifier | 14 August 2026 | 6th | 1983 | 2003 | 1 | Thirteenth place (1983) | TBD |
| Samoa | Oceania Qualifier | 17 September 2026 | 8th | 1991 | 2023 | 1 | Sixth place (2003) | TBD |
| Tonga | Oceania Qualifier | 17 September 2026 | 2nd | 2023 | | 2 | Ninth place (2023) | TBD |
| Malawi | Africa Qualifier | 22 September 2026 | 8th | 1995 | 2023 | 6 | Fifth place (2007) | TBD |
| Namibia | Africa Qualifier | 22 September 2026 | 3rd | 1991 | 1995 | 1 | Thirteenth place (1991) | TBD |
| Scotland | Europe Qualifier | 27 September 2026 | 16th | 1963 | 2023 | 4 | Sixth place (1971, 1975, 1983) | TBD |
| Northern Ireland | Europe Qualifier | 27 September 2026 | 13th | 1963 | 2019 | 1 | Seventh place (1983) | TBD |
