= 2027 Netball World Cup qualification – Africa =

International netball tournament in Kenya

Tournament details
- Host country: Kenya
- Dates: 19–26 September 2026
- Teams: 10

Final positions
- Champions: Uganda (4th title)
- Runners-up: South Africa
- Third place: Malawi

Tournament statistics
- Matches played: 27

The 2027 Netball World Cup Qualifier Africa was the sixth staging of Africa's qualifying competition that determine which national teams from Africa qualify for the Netball World Cup. the tournament was held in Kasarani, Kenya from 19 to 26 September 2026.

Uganda's She Cranes won the tournament after defeating South Africa 56–53 in the final.

== Participating nations ==
Ten teams entered the qualifying tournament, with Nigeria making its international debut.

The participating teams are listed below, with their World Netball ranking shown in parentheses.

- Botswana (27th)
- Kenya (21st)
- Malawi (8th)
- Namibia (14th)
- Nigeria (NR)

- South Africa (Note: South Africa and Uganda qualified automatically, regardless of the outcome of the qualifiers.) (5th)
- Tanzania (NR)
- Uganda (6th)
- Zambia (17th)
- Zimbabwe (11th)

Did not enter

- Burundi (—)
- Eswatini (47th)
- Ivory Coast (—)
- Lesotho (NR)

== Pool stage ==
=== Pool A ===
Pos	Team	Pld	W	D	L	GF	GA	%	Pts	Qualification
1	South Africa	4	4	0	0	275	128	214.8	8	Advance to Semi Finals
2	Namibia	4	3	0	1	196	154	127.3	6	Advance to Semi Finals
3	Zimbabwe	4	2	0	2	202	172	117.4	4	Advance to 5th place play-off
4	Botswana	4	1	0	3	162	218	74.3	2	Advance to 7th place play-off
5	Tanzania	4	0	0	4	121	284	42.6	0	Advance to 9th place play-off

19 September 2026; 11:00 a.m.	Tanzania	22–90	South Africa	Moi International Sports Centre, Kasarani

19 September 2026; 03:00 p.m.	Botswana	39–57	Zimbabwe	Moi International Sports Centre, Kasarani

20 September 2026; 12:00 p.m.	Namibia	54–32	Botswana	Moi International Sports Centre, Kasarani

20 September 2026; 04:00 p.m.	South Africa	58–41	Zimbabwe	Moi International Sports Centre, Kasarani

21 September 2026; 02:00 p.m.	Zimbabwe	31–47	Namibia	Moi International Sports Centre, Kasarani

21 September 2026; 06:00 p.m.	Botswana	59–35	Tanzania	Moi International Sports Centre, Kasarani

22 September 2026; 12:00 p.m.	Namibia	62–36	Tanzania	Moi International Sports Centre, Kasarani

22 September 2026; 04:00 p.m.	South Africa	72–32	Botswana	Moi International Sports Centre, Kasarani

23 September 2026; 02:00 p.m.	Tanzania	28–73	Zimbabwe	Moi International Sports Centre, Kasarani

23 September 2026; 06:00 p.m.	Namibia	33–55	South Africa	Moi International Sports Centre, Kasarani

=== Pool B ===
Pos	Team	Pld	W	D	L	GF	GA	%	Pts	Qualification
1	Uganda	4	4	0	0	243	161	150.9	8	Advance to Semi Finals
2	Malawi	4	3	0	1	258	176	146.6	6	Advance to Semi Finals
3	Kenya (H)	4	2	0	2	204	228	89.5	4	Advance to 5th place play-off
4	Zambia	4	1	0	3	191	248	77	2	Advance to 7th place play-off
5	Nigeria	4	0	0	4	136	219	62.1	0	Advance to 9th place play-off

(H) Host

19 September 2026; 01:00 p.m.	Malawi	72–38	Zambia	Moi International Sports Centre, Kasarani

19 September 2026; 07:00 p.m.	Kenya	61–40	Nigeria	Moi International Sports Centre, Kasarani

20 September 2026; 02:00 p.m.	Malawi	55–47	Kenya	Moi International Sports Centre, Kasarani

20 September 2026; 06:00 p.m.	Nigeria	30–68	Uganda	Moi International Sports Centre, Kasarani

21 September 2026; 12:00 p.m.	Zambia	40–59	Uganda	Moi International Sports Centre, Kasarani

21 September 2026; 04:00 p.m.	Malawi	82–22	Nigeria	Moi International Sports Centre, Kasarani

22 September 2026; 02:00 p.m.	Nigeria	44–63	Zambia	Moi International Sports Centre, Kasarani

22 September 2026; 06:00 p.m.	Kenya	42–62	Uganda	Moi International Sports Centre, Kasarani

23 September 2026; 12:00 p.m.	Uganda	54–49	Malawi	Moi International Sports Centre, Kasarani

23 September 2026; 04:00 p.m.	Zambia	50–54	Kenya	Moi International Sports Centre, Kasarani

== Placement matches ==
=== Ninth place ===
25 September 2026; 06:00 p.m.	Tanzania	53–49	Nigeria	Moi International Sports Centre, Kasarani

=== Seventh place ===
26 September 2026; 08:00 a.m.	Botswana	47–51	Zambia	Moi International Sports Centre, Kasarani

=== Fifth place ===
26 September 2026; 10:00 a.m.	Zimbabwe	57–63	Kenya	Moi International Sports Centre, Kasarani

== Knockout stage ==
Semi Finals
25 September
South Africa	62
Malawi	46
25 September
Uganda	52
Namibia	41

Final
26 September
South Africa	53
Uganda	56
Third place play-off
26 September
Malawi	50
Namibia	45

=== Semi Finals ===
25 September 2026; 02:00 p.m.	South Africa	62–46	Malawi	Moi International Sports Centre, Kasarani

25 September 2026; 04:00 p.m.	Uganda	52–41	Namibia	Moi International Sports Centre, Kasarani

=== Third place ===
26 September 2026; 12:00 p.m.	Malawi	50–45	Namibia	Moi International Sports Centre, Kasarani

=== Final ===
26 September 2026; 04:00 p.m.	South Africa	53–56	Uganda	Moi International Sports Centre, Kasarani

== Final standings ==
Pos	Team
1st	Uganda
2nd	South Africa
3rd	Malawi
4th	Namibia
5th	Kenya
6th	Zimbabwe
7th	Zambia
8th	Botswana
9th	Tanzania
10th	Nigeria

Qualified for the 2027 Netball World Cup via the World Netball Rankings
Qualified for the 2027 Netball World Cup
