= West Indies netball team =

National netball team

West Indies
- Association: West Indies Netball Board; West Indies Netball Association

Netball World Cup
- Appearances: 1 (Debuted in 1963)
- 1963 placing: 7th
- Best result: 7th (1963)

The West Indies netball team represented the West Indies Netball Board at the 1963 World Netball Tournament. In the 1980s and 1990s a West Indies team also played England and Wales in a series of test matches.

== History ==
=== 1950s, 1960s ===
Competitive netball among Caribbean/West Indies countries started in 1954 with a triangular tournament featuring Trinidad and Tobago, Saint Vincent and the Grenadines and Grenada. In 1954, Lystra Lewis, the pioneering netball coach and administrator, was instrumental in establishing the West Indies Netball Board in an effort to formalise the West Indies Netball Championship. In 1960, Lewis represented the board at the meeting in Colombo, Ceylon that established the International Federation of Women's Basketball and Netball Associations, now known as World Netball. In 1962 England toured the West Indies and played a series of test matches against Jamaica, Trinidad and Tobago and a combined West Indies team. At the 1963 World Netball Tournament, together with Jamaica and Trinidad and Tobago, the West Indies was one of three teams to represent the Americas. The team was captained by Peggy Ince-Hull from Saint Vincent and the Grenadines. They finished 7th with wins against Ceylon, Northern Ireland, Scotland, Wales.

=== 1980s, 1990s ===
In 1987, 1991 and 1998 a West Indies team played England in a series of test matches. Trinidad and Tobago's Jean Pierre coached the 1987 West Indies team. Trinidad and Tobago's Bridget Adams was a member of the 1991 West Indies team. In 1991 and 1998 they also played Wales.

== Tournament history ==
=== Netball World Cup ===
Tournaments	Place
1963 World Netball Tournament	7th

=== West Indies England series ===
Tournaments	Place
1962 England tour of the West Indies	
1987 England West Indies series	
1991 England Wales West Indies series	
1998 England Wales West Indies series	

== Notable players ==
=== Captains ===
Captains	Years
Peggy Ince-Hull	1963

== Head coaches ==
Coach	Years
Jean Pierre	1987
