= Betty McNamara =

New Zealand netball player

Betty McNamara (born 1941) was a former New Zealand netball international. She played in the 1963 World Netball Tournament.

== Netball career ==
Betty McNamara was born on 2 December 1941. She played netball with the Auckland team as a defender before being the 32nd woman selected to play for the Silver Ferns, the New Zealand national netball team, in the 1963 World Netball Tournament. The Silver Ferns finished runners up in the competition, having lost the decisive match to Australia by 37-36. In all, McNamara won ten caps.
