= 2011 Constellation Cup =

International netball series

Tournament details
- Host countries: Australia; New Zealand
- Dates: 9 June – 30 October 2011

Final positions
- Champions: Australia (2nd title)
- Runners-up: New Zealand

Tournament statistics
- Matches played: 5

The 2011 Constellation Cup was the 2nd Constellation Cup series played between Australia and New Zealand. The series featured five netball test matches. The series was effectively two separate series played before and after the 2011 World Netball Championships. In June 2011, Australia traveled to New Zealand for the New World Series. The Australia team was coached by Norma Plummer and captained by Natalie von Bertouch. New Zealand were coached by Ruth Aitken and captained by Temepara George and Casey Williams. Australia won the opening test before New Zealand leveled the series at 1–1. In October 2011, New Zealand traveled to Australia for the Holden Netball Test Series. This time the Australia team was coached by Lisa Alexander and captained by Catherine Cox. New Zealand also saw a change in their leadership with Waimarama Taumaunu taking over as head coach and Laura Langman taking on the captaincy. After winning the third test, New Zealand led the series 2–1. However, Australia won the final two tests to win the series 3–2.

== Squads ==
=== Australia ===
Australia roster
Players
Coaches

Name	Pos	DOB	Height	Club	Nat	Caps
Erin Bell	GA, WA, GS	26 October 1985 (aged 25)	1.78 m (5 ft 10 in)	Adelaide Thunderbirds
Natalie von Bertouch^{1} (c) (injured)	C, WA, WD	16 December 1982 (aged 28)	1.75 m (5 ft 9 in)	Adelaide Thunderbirds
Madison Browne	WA, C	5 January 1988 (aged 23)	1.68 m (5 ft 6 in)	Melbourne Vixens
Rebecca Bulley	GD, GK, WD	18 August 1982 (aged 28)	1.86 m (6 ft 1 in)	New South Wales Swifts
Julie Corletto (vc)	GD, WD, GK	10 October 1986 (aged 24)	1.84 m (6 ft 0 in)	Melbourne Vixens
Catherine Cox^{1} (c)	GS, GA	24 May 1976 (aged 35)	1.88 m (6 ft 2 in)	West Coast Fever
Susan Fuhrmann	GK	30 July 1986 (aged 24)	1.96 m (6 ft 5 in)	West Coast Fever
Laura Geitz	GK, GD	4 November 1987 (aged 23)	1.85 m (6 ft 1 in)	Queensland Firebirds
Mo'onia Gerrard (vc)	GD, WD	15 November 1980 (aged 30)	1.80 m (5 ft 11 in)	New South Wales Swifts
Kimberlee Green	C, WA	5 March 1986 (aged 25)	1.76 m (5 ft 9 in)	New South Wales Swifts
Sharni Layton	GK, GD, WD	6 January 1988 (aged 23)	1.88 m (6 ft 2 in)	Adelaide Thunderbirds
Natalie Medhurst	GA, GS	20 January 1984 (aged 27)	1.78 m (5 ft 10 in)	Queensland Firebirds
Chelsea Pitman	GA, WA	8 June 1988 (aged 23)	1.81 m (5 ft 11 in)	Queensland Firebirds
Susan Pratley	GA, GS	23 March 1984 (aged 27)	1.80 m (5 ft 11 in)	New South Wales Swifts

Head coach

- Norma Plummer
  Lisa Alexander^{2}

Assistant coach

- Julie Fitzgerald

Manager:
Margaret Molina
Doctors
Roslyn Carbon
Tom Hilton
Physiotherapist:
Alanna Antcliff
Steve Hawkins
Performance Analyst
Tara Handke^{3}

Notes

- (c) – Captain
- (cc) – Co-captain
- (vc) – Vice-captain
- – Injury / maternity leave
- (TRP) – Temporary Replacement Player

Notes

- ^1 Natalie von Bertouch captained Australia during the New World Netball Series in June. Catherine Cox captained Australia during the Holden Netball Test Series in October.
- ^2 Norma Plummer was Australia's head coach during the New World Netball Series in June. Lisa Alexander was Australia's head coach during the Holden Netball Test Series in October.
- ^3 Australia support team for during the Holden Netball Test Series in October.

Debuts

- Chelsea Pitman made her senior debut for Australia in the 1st test on 9 June.
- Sharni Layton made her senior debut for Australia in the 2nd test on 12 June.

=== New Zealand ===
New Zealand roster
Players
Coaches

Name	Pos	DOB	Height	Club	Nat	Caps
Kayla Cullen	GD, WD, C	13 February 1992 (aged 19)	1.83 m (6 ft 0 in)	Northern Mystics
Leana de Bruin	GD, GK	9 July 1977 (aged 33)	1.90 m (6 ft 3 in)	Southern Steel
Irene van Dyk (vc)	GS, GA	21 June 1972 (aged 38)	1.90 m (6 ft 3 in)	Waikato Bay of Plenty Magic
Temepara George^{4} (c)	C, WA	23 October 1975 (aged 35)	1.70 m (5 ft 7 in)	Northern Mystics
Katrina Grant	GK, GD, WD	6 May 1987 (aged 24)	1.87 m (6 ft 2 in)	Central Pulse
Paula Griffin	GS, GA	11 July 1988 (aged 22)	1.85 m (6 ft 1 in)	Southern Steel
Joline Henry	GD, WD	29 September 1982 (aged 28)	1.83 m (6 ft 0 in)	Northern Mystics
Laura Langman^{4} (c)	C, WD	16 April 1986 (aged 25)	1.73 m (5 ft 8 in)	Waikato Bay of Plenty Magic
Cathrine Latu	GS, GA	25 October 1986 (aged 24)	1.89 m (6 ft 2 in)	Northern Mystics
Liana Leota	C, WA	31 October 1984 (aged 26)	1.68 m (5 ft 6 in)	Southern Steel
Anna Scarlett	GK, GD, WD	15 April 1983 (aged 28)	1.87 m (6 ft 2 in)	Northern Mystics
Anna Thompson	GA, GS	18 June 1986 (aged 24)	1.76 m (5 ft 9 in)	Canterbury Tactix
Maria Tutaia	GA, GS	18 February 1987 (aged 24)	1.88 m (6 ft 2 in)	Northern Mystics
Casey Williams^{4} (c)	GD, GK	19 June 1985 (aged 25)	1.88 m (6 ft 2 in)	Waikato Bay of Plenty Magic

Head coach

- Ruth Aitken
  Waimarama Taumaunu^{5}

Notes

- (c) – Captain
- (cc) – Co-captain
- (vc) – Vice-captain
- – Injury / maternity leave
- (TRP) – Temporary Replacement Player

Notes

- ^4 Temepara George captained New Zealand for the first test and Casey Williams captained New Zealand for the second test. Laura Langman captained New Zealand for the Holden Netball Test Series.
- ^5 Ruth Aitken was New Zealand's head coach during the New World Netball Series in June. Waimarama Taumaunu was New Zealand's head coach during the Holden Netball Test Series in October.

== Matches ==
=== New World Netball Series ===
In June 2011, Australia traveled to New Zealand for the New World Series. The Australia team was coached by Norma Plummer and captained by Natalie von Bertouch. New Zealand were coached by Ruth Aitken and captained by Casey Williams. However, Williams missed the first test due to injury and New Zealand were captained by Temepara George. Australia won the opening test before New Zealand leveled the series at 1–1. Both teams used this series to prepare for the 2011 World Netball Championships.

==== First test ====
9 June 2011	New Zealand	47–52	Australia	Arena Manawatu; Attendance: 2,700
9 June 2011	Scoring by quarter: 15–14, 29–25, 38–39, 47–52			Arena Manawatu; Attendance: 2,700
9 June 2011	Irene van Dyk 26/30 (87%); Maria Tutaia 21/27 (78%)		Catherine Cox 28/36 (78%); Natalie Medhurst 24/30 (80%)	Arena Manawatu; Attendance: 2,700

==== Second test ====
12 June 2011	New Zealand	45–42	Australia	Vector Arena; Attendance: 8,300
12 June 2011	Scoring by quarter: 10–12, 24–20, 36–32, 45–42			Vector Arena; Attendance: 8,300
12 June 2011	Maria Tutaia 27/33 (82%); Irene van Dyk 13/14 (93%); Paula Griffin 5/9 (56%)		Caitlin Bassett 28/33 (85%); Catherine Cox 11/13 (85%); Natalie Medhurst 3/6 (50%)	Vector Arena; Attendance: 8,300

=== Holden Netball Test Series ===
In October 2011, New Zealand traveled to Australia for the Holden Netball Test Series. This time the Australia team was coached by Lisa Alexander and, in the absence of an injured Natalie von Bertouch, were captained by Catherine Cox. New Zealand also saw a change in their leadership with Waimarama Taumaunu taking over as head coach and Laura Langman taking on the captaincy. After winning the third test, New Zealand led the series 2–1. However, Australia won the final two tests to win the series 3–2.

==== Third test ====
23 October 2011	Australia	48–49	New Zealand	Burswood Dome; Attendance: 6,500
23 October 2011	Caitlin Bassett 19/21 (90%); Catherine Cox 14/23 (61%); Natalie Medhurst 15/20 (75%)		Irene van Dyk 27/29 (93%); Maria Tutaia 22	Burswood Dome; Attendance: 6,500

==== Fourth test ====
26 October 2011	Australia	51–44	New Zealand	Adelaide Entertainment Centre
26 October 2011	Scoring by quarter: 12–14, 25–26, 36–36, 51–44			Adelaide Entertainment Centre
26 October 2011	Catherine Cox 34/42 (81%) ??		Cathrine Latu 27/31 (87%); Maria Tutaia	Adelaide Entertainment Centre

==== Fifth test ====
30 October 2011	Australia	44–41	New Zealand	Hisense Arena; Attendance: 9,600
30 October 2011	Scoring by quarter: 6–12, 16–22, 33–31, 44–41			Hisense Arena; Attendance: 9,600
30 October 2011	Catherine Cox 9/12 (75%); Natalie Medhurst 1/2 (50%); Erin Bell 14/17 (82%); Caitlin Bassett 20/22 (91%)		Irene van Dyk 24/26 (92%); Maria Tutaia 17/22 (77%)	Hisense Arena; Attendance: 9,600
