= Elva Simpson =

New Zealand netball player

Personal information
- Full name: Elva Violet Simpson (née: Tait)
- Born: 6 November 1936
- Died: 30 November 2009 (aged 73)
- Height: 1.70 m (5 ft 7 in)
- Relative: Mahal Pearce (son-in-law)

Netball career
- Playing positions: WD, GD
Years	National team	Caps
1963	New Zealand	5
Medal record
Representing New Zealand
World Netball Tournament
Silver medal – second place	1963 Eastbourne	Tournament

Elva Violet Simpson (née Tait; 6 November 1936 – 30 November 2009) was a New Zealand netball international. She played five international matches for New Zealand at the 1963 World Netball Tournament, where they finished second to Australia.

== Early life and family ==
Simpson was born Elva Violet Tait in Dunedin on 6 November 1936. In 1958, she married pharmacist Gordon Bingham Simpson, and the couple had four children, including a daughter, Sally, who married golfer Mahal Pearce.

== Netball career ==
Simpson played representative netball for Otago as a defender from at least 1953. and in 1954 she was named as an emergency in the South Island team for the inter-island match at the conclusion of the New Zealand national netball championships. At the 1961 national championships, Simpson was selected as goal keeper and captain of the South Island team, which defeated the North Island 50–31.

Simpson was a member of the New Zealand team at the 1963 World Netball Tournament, making her debut in the first-round match against Northern Ireland. With two young children at the time, she was one of only two mothers playing in the tournament. New Zealand recorded nine wins and one loss, 36–37 against Australia, to finish as runners-up. Simpson played in five of New Zealand's matches at the tournament.

== Later life ==
Simpson was a member of a team consisting of players from Otago and Southland at the Golden Oldies World Netball Festivals in 1984 in Auckland, and 1988 in Brisbane.

Simpson's husband, Gordon, died in 1999.

At the 2008 New Zealand Masters Games in Dunedin, Simpson won the 500 metres, 1000 metres, and 2000 metres indoor rowing events in the women's 70–74 category. She died in Dunedin on 30 November 2009, and her ashes were buried in Dunedin Southern Cemetery.
