= Pamela Barham =

New Zealand netball player and coach

Personal information
- Full name: Pamela Joy Barham (Née: Smith)
- Born: 11 November 1933 Dunedin, New Zealand
- Died: 13 December 2001 (aged 68) Brisbane, Queensland, Australia
- Height: 1.82 m (6 ft 0 in)
- Spouses: James David Edmonds (div. 1967); Ian Hamilton Barham

Netball career
- Playing positions: C, WA
Years	National team	Caps
1960–1963	New Zealand	12
Coaching career
- Years: Team
- 1985–1986: Australia
Medal record
Representing New Zealand
World Netball Tournament
Silver medal – second place	1963 Eastbourne	Tournament

Pamela Joy Barham (formerly Edmonds, née Smith; 11 November 1933 – 13 December 2001) was a former New Zealand netball international and coach. She played 12 Tests for New Zealand, and captained the side at the 1963 World Netball Tournament, where they were runners-up. She later coached Australia in 1985 and 1986.

== Early life ==
Barham was born Pamela Joy Smith in Dunedin on 11 November 1933, the daughter of Percy Albert Smith and Violet Sarah Elizabeth Smith (née Bland). After moving to Christchurch when she was 16 years old, she became a physical education teacher, taught at Christchurch West High School, and married James David Edmonds.

== Netball playing career ==
Edmonds was a member of the Canterbury provincial netball team from 1953, playing mainly at centre, and gained South Island honours from 1957. She also represented Canterbury and the South Island in women's basketball.

In 1960, Edmonds was described as "one of the fittest players in New Zealand", and it was reported that "she intercepts and attacks well and passes brilliantly into the goal circle". She was subsequently selected for the New Zealand team that toured Australia that year. She played in 14 of the 16 games on tour, including in all three Test matches, and it was reported that her play at centre "was sound in all her games, and the speed with which she threw the ball into the forwards earned some very favourable comments". In the first Test match in Adelaide, New Zealand achieved their first ever victory over Australia, winning 49–40. However, the second and third Tests of the series were won by Australia, 44–39 and 46–45, respectively.

Three years later, Edmonds captained the New Zealand team at the 1963 World Netball Tournament. At the tournament, New Zealand recorded nine wins and one loss, 36–37 against Australia, to finish as runners-up.

== Move to Australia and coaching career ==
After her divorce from Jim Edmonds in 1967, Pamela Edmonds married university lecturer Ian Hamilton Barham, and the couple moved to Brisbane, Australia, in 1974. Pamela Barham taught movement and dance at the University of Queensland, and continued her involvement in netball as a coach. She coached the Australian national netball team in 1985–1986, including at the 1985 World Games, where Australia finished second to New Zealand.

After her short tenure coaching Australia, Barham and English netballer Christine Maylor established Netball Coaching International, a consultancy that saw them travelling internationally to coach netball players and advise netball coaches. In 1988, Barham co-authored Netball Australia: a socio-historical analysis with sports historian Ian Jobling.

Barham died in Brisbane on 13 December 2001. Her husband, Ian, returned to New Zealand and died at Whangaparaoa on 24 October 2003.
