= Gregory Riethmaier =

German-New Zealand photographer

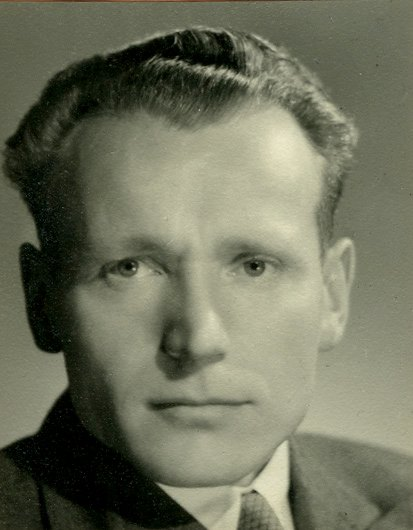
- Born: Gregor Hans Otto Riethmaier; 18 November 1913; Munich, Germany
- Died: 25 April 2004 (aged 91); Auckland, New Zealand
- Occupation: Photographer

Gregory Riethmaier (born Gregor Hans Otto Riethmaier, 18 November 1913 – 25 April 2004) was a German–New Zealand photographer.

== Early life ==
Riethmaier was born in Munich, Germany, in 1913 (some sources state 1914) into a Roman Catholic family who ran a tavern. His father was killed in action during the First World War.

As a youth, Riethmaier was an admirer of naval officer Count Felix von Luckner. In 1936 he secured a position as radio operator on Luckner's boat Seeteufel ("Sea-Devil"), which departed Germany in April 1937 on a goodwill world tour. The vessel arrived in Auckland, New Zealand, in February 1938; having fallen out with Luckner during the voyage, Riethmaier applied to remain in Auckland. He quickly found work and began studying commerce at Auckland University College. However, as a German national in an Allied country, he was arrested in December 1939 shortly after the outbreak of the Second World War, and was interned with other "enemy aliens" for the duration of the war on Somes Island near Wellington. Under the terms of the Geneva Conventions, he was allowed to continue his studies at Victoria University College while interned.

== Photography career ==
After the war, Riethmaier became a professional photographer and established his own business in Auckland under the anglicised name "Mr Gregory". He was granted New Zealand citizenship in 1955. In 1959, he joined the National Publicity Studios (part of the New Zealand government's Tourism and Publicity Department), later becoming Senior Photographer.

Riethmaier published four books of photography, including two on the city of Auckland (1968 and 1973), and one on Western and American Samoa (1973). His first book, Rebecca and the Maoris (1964), focused on netballer Rebecca Faulkner Chaplow and her life in the Rotorua Māori community. Contemporary reviewers found the Chaplow book "delightful" and "well designed"; retrospective commentators have adjudged the work as somewhat patronising in its depiction of its Māori subjects.

== Personal life ==
In 1949, Riethmaier married Elsie Capper (1920–2009); the couple had three children. He died in Auckland on 25 April 2004, aged 91.

His unpublished memoir is held in the National Library of New Zealand.

== Bibliography ==
- Rebecca and the Maoris (A.H. & A.W. Reed, 1964)
- Auckland: Gateway to New Zealand, with R.L. Bacon (Collins, 1968)
- Samoa, ma le Fa'asamoa, with Richard A. Goodman (Collins, 1973). ISBN 9780002117296
- Auckland: Town and Around, with R.L. Bacon (Collins, 1973). ISBN 9780002160131
