= 2026 Asian Netball Championships =

Tournament details
- Host country: Hong Kong
- City: Hong Kong
- Venue: Kai Tak Arena
- Dates: 8–15 August 2026
- Teams: 6 (Cup); 5 (Plate)

Final positions
- Champions: Singapore (5th title)
- Runners-up: Hong Kong
- Third place: Sri Lanka

Tournament statistics
- Matches played: 20 (Cup); 14 (Plate)

The 2026 Asian Netball Championships was the 14th edition of the biannual continental championship for women's national netball teams, organised by Asia's governing netball body, Asia Netball. The tournament was played from 8 to 15 August 2026.

Hong Kong hosted the tournament for the second time, after 1993. The venue was the Kai Tak Arena.

11 teams took part, divided into Cup and Plate competitions. This tournament acted as a qualifier for the 2027 Netball World Cup in Sydney, with the top two finishers of the Cup competitions qualifying.

Singapore are the defending champions, beating Sri Lanka, 67–64, at the final in Singapore. Singapore retained the title after a 57–33 win over Hong Kong in the final.

== Teams ==
=== Cup ===
- Hong Kong (hosts)
- India
- Malaysia
- Maldives
- Sri Lanka
- Singapore

=== Plate ===
- Chinese Taipei
- Japan
- Pakistan
- Thailand
- South Korea

== Cup competition ==
=== Group ===
Pos	Team	Pld	W	D	L	GF	GA	GD	Pts	Qualification
1	Malaysia	5	4	0	1	336	208	+128	8 (Note: Malaysia 52–46 Singapore)	Semifinals
2	Singapore	5	4	0	1	329	193	+136	8	Semifinals
3	Sri Lanka	5	3	1	1	352	238	+114	7	Semifinals
4	Hong Kong	5	2	1	2	270	227	+43	5	Semifinals
5	Maldives	5	1	0	4	178	333	−155	2	5th place game
6	India	5	0	0	5	163	429	−266	0	5th place game

Source: Hong Kong 2026
Notes:

8 August 2026; 14:30	Report	Hong Kong	57 – 57	Sri Lanka	Kai Tak Arena, Hong Kong

8 August 2026; 16:30	Report	Malaysia	101 – 27	India	Kai Tak Arena, Hong Kong

8 August 2026; 18:30	Report	Singapore	81 – 19	Maldives	Kai Tak Arena, Hong Kong

9 August 2026; 15:00	Report	Hong Kong	81 – 30	India	Kai Tak Arena, Hong Kong

9 August 2026; 17:00	Report	Singapore	62 – 51	Sri Lanka	Kai Tak Arena, Hong Kong

9 August 2026; 19:00	Report	Malaysia	78 – 32	Maldives	Kai Tak Arena, Hong Kong

10 August 2026; 15:00	Report	Maldives	60 – 41	India	Kai Tak Arena, Hong Kong

10 August 2026; 17:00	Report	Malaysia	52 – 66	Sri Lanka	Kai Tak Arena, Hong Kong

10 August 2026; 19:00	Report	Hong Kong	40 – 53	Singapore	Kai Tak Arena, Hong Kong

11 August 2026; 15:00	Report	Sri Lanka	100 – 34	India	Kai Tak Arena, Hong Kong

11 August 2026; 17:00	Report	Singapore	46 – 52	Malaysia	Kai Tak Arena, Hong Kong

11 August 2026; 19:00	Report	Hong Kong	55 – 34	Maldives	Kai Tak Arena, Hong Kong

12 August 2026; 15:00	Report	Maldives	33 – 78	Sri Lanka	Kai Tak Arena, Hong Kong

12 August 2026; 17:00	Report	India	31 – 87	Singapore	Kai Tak Arena, Hong Kong

12 August 2026; 19:00	Report	Hong Kong	37 – 53	Malaysia	Kai Tak Arena, Hong Kong

=== Knockout stage ===
==== 5th place game ====
14 August 2026; 14:30	Report	Maldives	53 – 39	India	Kai Tak Arena, Hong Kong

==== Bracket ====
Semi-finals
14 August 2026
Malaysia	47
Hong Kong	51
14 August 2026
Singapore	82
Sri Lanka	54

Gold medal match
15 August 2026
Hong Kong	33
Singapore	57
Bronze medal match
15 August 2026
Malaysia	60
Sri Lanka	65

==== Semifinals ====
14 August 2026; 16:30	Report	Singapore	82 – 54	Sri Lanka	Kai Tak Arena, Hong Kong

14 August 2026; 18:30	Report	Malaysia	47 – 51	Hong Kong	Kai Tak Arena, Hong Kong

==== Third place game ====
15 August 2026	Malaysia	60 – 65	Sri Lanka	Kai Tak Arena, Hong Kong
15 August 2026	Scoring by quarter: 13–12, 17–19, 17–15, 13–19			Kai Tak Arena, Hong Kong

==== Final ====
15 August 2026	Hong Kong	33 – 57	Singapore	Kai Tak Arena, Hong Kong
15 August 2026	Scoring by quarter: 10–23, 10–9, 6–16, 7–9			Kai Tak Arena, Hong Kong
