= Dixie Cockerton =

New Zealand netball player and coach, cricketer, and school principal

- Born: Dixie June Cockerton; 10 July 1925; Hāwera, New Zealand
- Died: 26 July 1998 (aged 73); Tauranga, New Zealand
- Education: Auckland Teachers' Training College
- Occupation: Schoolteacher
- Height: 1.83 m (6 ft 0 in)
- Netball career
- Playing position: GK
Years	National team	Caps
1948	New Zealand	1
Coaching career
- Years: Team
- 1960–1963: New Zealand
- Cricket career

Cricket information
- Batting: Right-handed

Domestic team information
- Years: Team
- 1953/54: Auckland

Career statistics
Competition	FC
Matches	2
Runs scored	48
Batting average	24.00
100s/50s	0/0
Top score	26
Catches/stumpings	0/0
- Source: CricketArchive, 4 October 2021

Dixie June Cockerton (10 July 1925 – 26 July 1998) was a New Zealand netball player and coach. She played as goal keep in the New Zealand team in one Test match, in 1948 against Australia. She went on to coach the national team from 1960 to 1963, guiding them to second place at the 1963 World Netball Tournament.

Cockerton was also a cricketer, making two first-class appearances for Auckland, and gaining a New Zealand trial in 1953.

A schoolteacher for almost 40 years, Cockerton was principal of Matamata Intermediate from 1970, and then Tauranga Intermediate from 1978 until her retirement in 1985. She was the first female principal of a New Zealand intermediate school.

== Early life ==
Born in Hāwera on 10 July 1925, Cockerton was the daughter of Ronald George Cockerton and Alice Thelma Cockerton (née Lyon). The family moved to Galatea during the Great Depression when Cockerton's father drew a farm in a ballot. She subsequently completed her secondary education by correspondence, before studying at Auckland Teachers' Training College.

== Sporting career ==
Described as a "fine all-round sportswoman", Cockerton played representative netball for Matamata and New Zealand, representative cricket for Matamata and Auckland women's teams, and representative softball for Matamata and the North Island. She was noted for her powerful hitting in both cricket and softball. She also played golf and lawn bowls.

=== Netball ===
==== Player ====
A tall player, Cockerton was a member of the Matamata team at the New Zealand national netball championships from 1945, competing in the second-grade tournament. Following the 1947 national championships in Nelson, she was selected for the New Zealand team to play the visiting Australian team the following year.

In 1948, Cockerton played in the first Test against the touring Australian team at Forbury Park in Dunedin. The match was played under international rules, with seven players per side, which were unfamiliar to the New Zealanders who were used to playing nine-a-side. The Australian team was victorious, winning 27–16. Cockerton then captained a combined Tauranga–Matamata selection against the touring Australians in Tauranga, won by the Australian team 12–8 and played under nine-a-side rules. After the match, Cockerton was one of two local players who took part in a seven-a-side exhibition match with members of the Australian team, but she injured her ankle and was subsequently replaced in the New Zealand team for the third Test in Auckland.

Cockerton continued to play for Matamata until at least 1953.

==== Coach and official ====
After retiring as a player, Cockerton moved into coaching. In 1960, she became the New Zealand national coach. In her first match in charge, the New Zealand team achieved their first ever victory over Australia, winning 49–40 in Adelaide. However, the second and third Tests of the series were won by Australia, 44–39 and 46–45, respectively. Cockerton was retained as national coach for the 1963 World Netball Tournament, where New Zealand recorded nine wins and one loss, 36–37 against Australia, to finish as runners-up in the tournament.

Overall, Cockerton's record of coach of the New Zealand team was 10 wins from 13 international matches, with all three losses coming against Australia.

Cockerton has been described as a popular and influential figure, tactically astute, and a coach ahead of her time. Lois Muir, who was a member of the New Zealand team in 1960 and 1963, has credited Cockerton as being hugely influential on both her playing and coaching careers.

Cockerton also had roles as a North Island and national selector. She was also a qualified netball umpire, and umpired three matches at the 1963 World Netball Championships. Drawing on her teaching background, she wrote netball coaching notes for primary schools, and was a national coaching award scheme examiner. In 1975, Cockerton received a national service award from the New Zealand Netball Association.

=== Cricket ===
Cockerton played for the Matamata women's cricket team against the touring Australian women's team at Matamata Domain on 25 February 1948. In that match, which was drawn, she batted at number eight and scored two runs before being bowled by Myrtle Craddock. The following season, Cockerton played for the Matamata women's team against the touring English women's team. Batting at five in the order, she was bowled by Mary Duggan for a duck. With the ball, she bowled five overs for 15 runs without taking a wicket. England won the match by eight wickets.

Cockerton played two-women's first-class cricket matches, for the Auckland women's cricket team in the 1953/54 season. She made 48 runs, at an average of 24.00. In 1953, Cockerton played in a trial to select the New Zealand women's team to tour England in 1954: she scored 20 runs with the bat but was not chosen for the touring squad.

In 1947, Cockerton's fielding was described as being "of the highest standard and would gain her a place in very many men's teams".

== Teaching career ==
In March 1947, Cockerton was appointed as a teacher at Walton School, but by later that year she was teaching at Tīrau School. She went on to be principal at Nawton Primary School in Hamilton, and a senior teacher at Rotorua Intermediate School. In 1970, she was appointed principal of Matamata Intermediate, becoming the first woman to head a New Zealand intermediate school. In 1978, she moved to Tauranga Intermediate as principal, where she remained until retiring in 1985.

== Later life ==
In retirement, Cockerton lived in Tauranga, where she died on 26 July 1998.
