= Ruth Aitken =

New Zealand netball player and coach

Dame Ruth Aitken DNZM
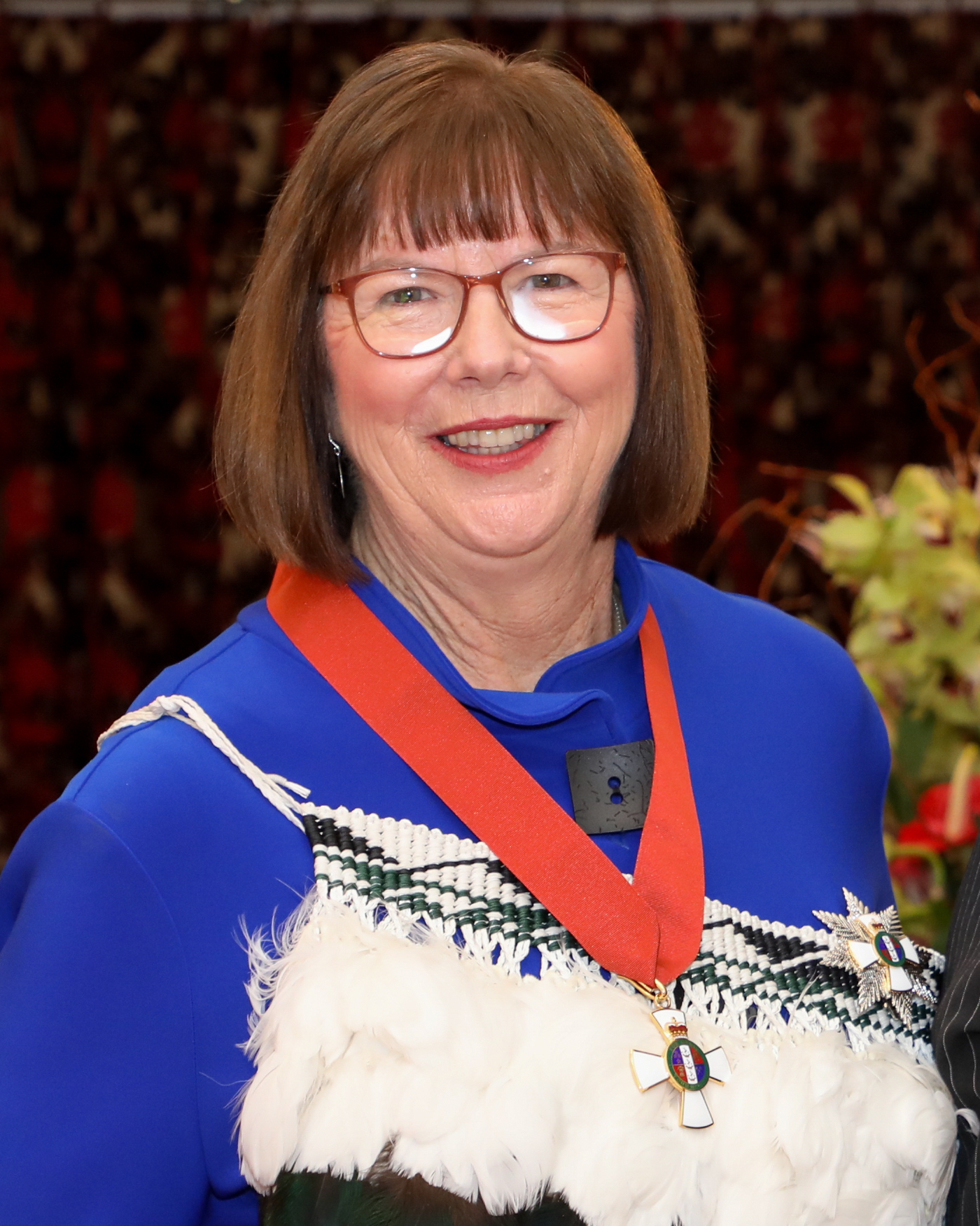
- Aitken in 2022

Personal information
- Full name: Ruth Ellina Aitken (née: Fathers)
- Born: 31 July 1956 (age 70) Paeroa, New Zealand

Netball career
- Playing position: WA
Years	National team	Caps
1979	New Zealand	3
Coaching career
- Years: Team
- 1998–1999: Counties Manukau Cometz
- 1999–2001: Waikato Bay of Plenty Magic
- 2001–2011: New Zealand
Medal record
Representing New Zealand
World Netball Tournament
Gold medal – first place	1979 Trinidad and Tobago	Team

Dame Ruth Ellina Aitken DNZM (née Fathers; born 31 July 1956) is a New Zealand former international-level netball player and former head coach of the New Zealand national netball team, the Silver Ferns.

== Biography ==
Aitken was born in 1956 in Paeroa. Her parents were Phil and Dorothy Fathers, who moved from Auckland to Paeroa after Aitken had children; that way she could continue with the travel required for her netball coaching career.

A former goal-attack, Aitken represented New Zealand in the 1979 World Netball Tournament in Trinidad and Tobago, playing two warm-up games and then in one match against Ireland.

Aitken became coach of the Silver Ferns in 2001, replacing Yvonne Willering. During Aitken's tenure as national head coach, the Silver Ferns won the 2003 World Netball Championships and the 2006 and 2010 Commonwealth Games, but came second to Australia at both the 2002 Commonwealth Games and the 2007 World Netball Championships. In February 2008, Aitken was re-signed as national head coach for a further four years. In late 2011, she retired as coach of the national team – and was later replaced by assistant Waimarama Taumaunu. In December 2012, it was announced that Aitken would take over as Technical Director and National Coach of Netball Singapore. She is a member of the Sports Tribunal of New Zealand.

== Honours and awards ==
At the 2003 Halberg Awards, Aitken was awarded Coach of the Year. In the 2011 Queen's Birthday Honours, Aitken was appointed an Officer of the New Zealand Order of Merit, for services to netball, alongside Silver Ferns captain Casey Williams. In the 2022 Queen's Birthday and Platinum Jubilee Honours, she was promoted to Dame Companion of the New Zealand Order of Merit, for services to netball.

In 2024, Aitken was an inaugural inductee to the Netball New Zealand Hall of Fame.
