= Woodbrook, Port of Spain =

Woodbrook Woodbrook, Port of Spain
- District
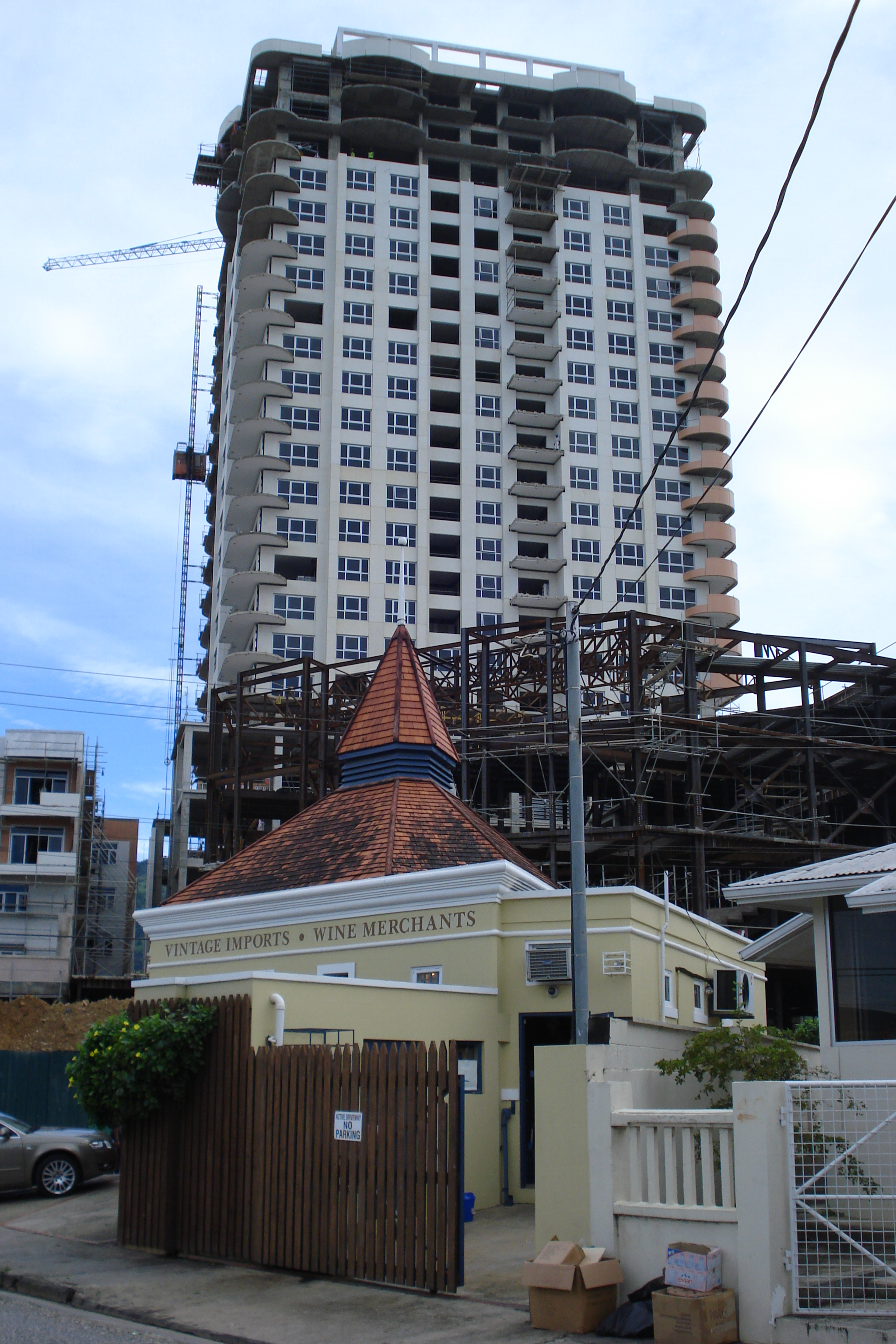
- Wine Merchant in Woodbrook, Port of Spain.
- Country: Trinidad and Tobago
- County: Saint George County
- City: Port of Spain
- District: Woodbrook
- Time zone: UTC-4 (AST)
  - Summer (DST): UTC-4 (DST)

The Woodbrook district, west of Downtown Port of Spain, Trinidad and Tobago, was formerly a sugar estate owned by the Siegert family of Angostura bitters fame. The estate was sold to the Town Board in 1911 and developed into a residential neighbourhood, with many of the north–south streets named for the Siegert siblings, some of whom were Carlos, Luis, Petra and Alfredo.

In the last twenty years the main east–west thoroughfares, Ariapita Avenue and Tragarete Road, have become almost entirely commercialised, and Ariapita Avenue west of Murray Street has become a relatively upscale dining and entertainment "strip". A few small parks are sprinkled through the neighbourhood; Adam Smith Square and Siegert Square are the two largest. The Community Association held a series of events in August 2011 to celebrate its 100th anniversary.

Just north of Woodbrook along Tragarete Road is the Queen's Park Oval, a major Test cricket ground, which is owned by the private Queen's Park Cricket Club (QPCC). At Woodbrook's western end, at the edge of Invaders Bay, is the Hasely Crawford Stadium, the national venue for football and track and field events.

== Green spaces within Woodbrook ==
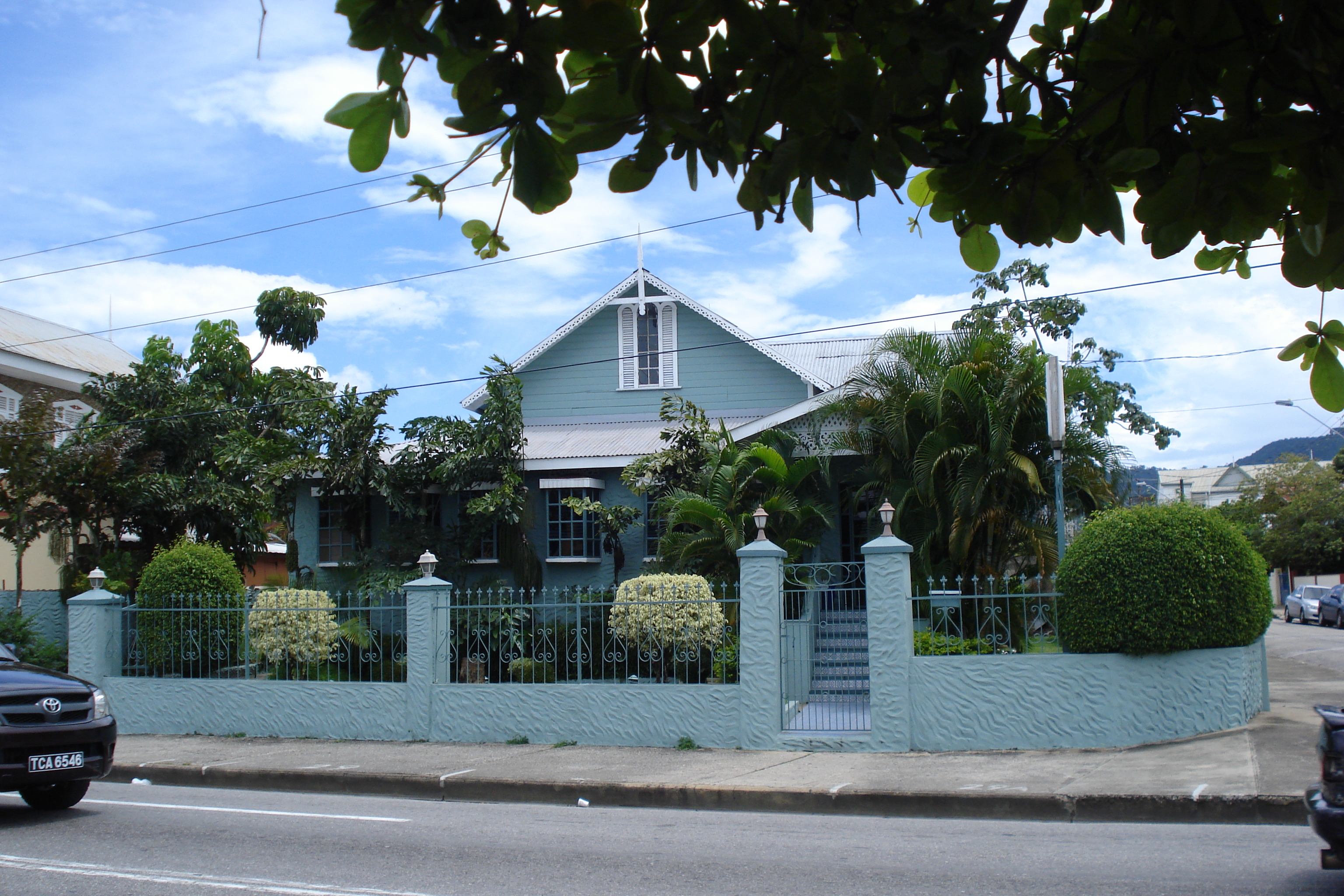
A typical Woodbrook gingerbread house 2008

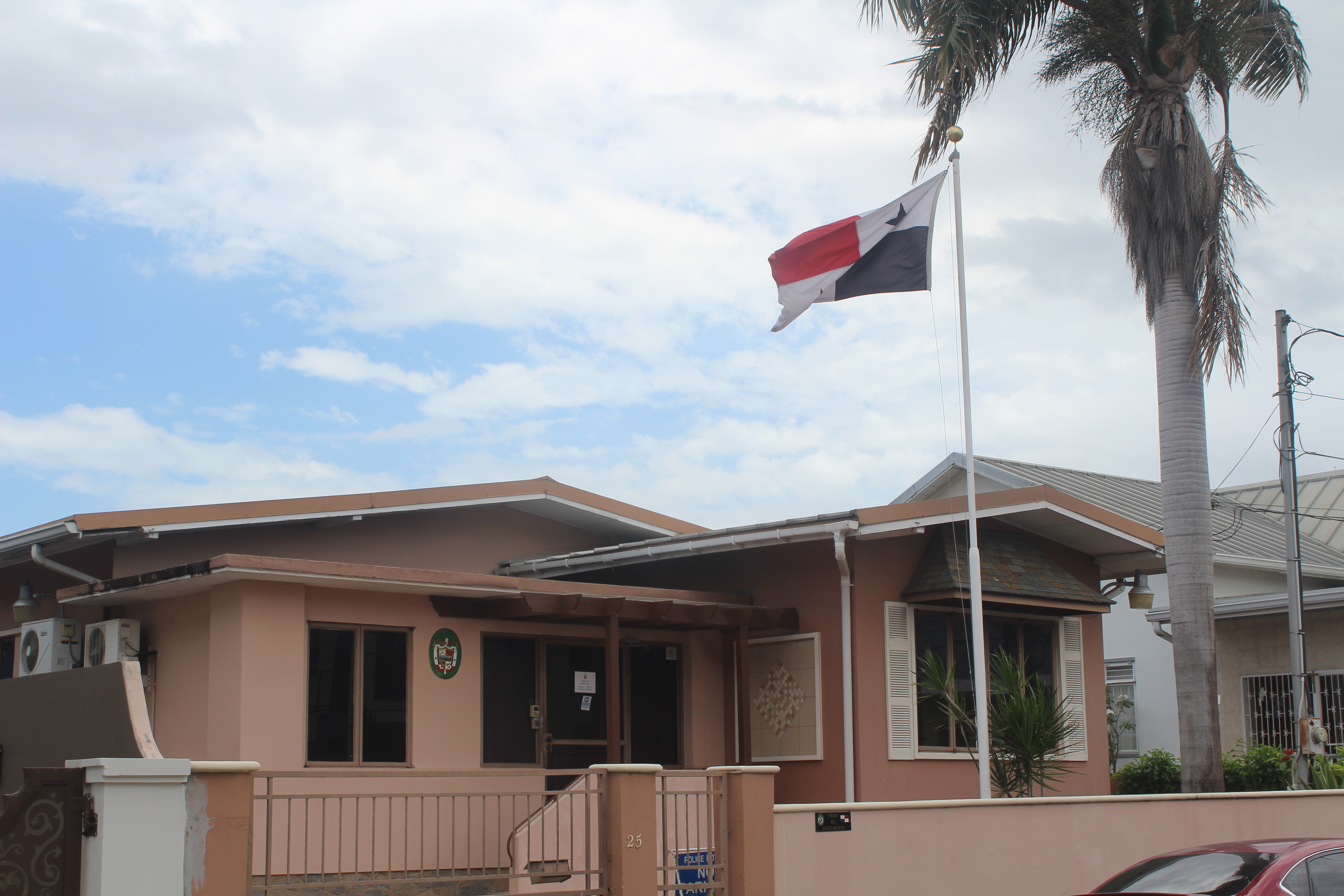
Panamanian Embassy in 25 De Verteuil Street, Woodbrook

One of the larger and older green spaces in Woodbrook is Adam Smith Square. This square is located on Ariapita Avenue in close proximity to Murray Street and was one of the parks of the old days. Adam Smith Square is surrounded by residences which have been restored and modified, many of which now function as business places.

In the weeks preceding Carnival each year, the look of the square changes as stadium style benches are built up by one of the City Corporations. On Carnival Monday and Tuesday, this square is one of the judging points for mas Bands which elect to cross the stage at this location.

Outside of Carnival, the square functions as a time-out spot as persons sit on benches while visiting any of the businesses in the neighbourhood. On weekends several young families bring their toddlers and young children to the square to run, play and get in some exercise and bonding time prior to the start of the next week.

In 2015, Adam Smith Square was one of the outdoor locations for a community cinema.
