= 1963 World Netball Tournament =

International netball tournament hosted by England

Tournament details
- Host country: England
- City: Eastbourne
- Venue: Chelsea College of Physical Education
- Dates: 2–14 August 1963
- Teams: 11

Final positions
- Champions: Australia (1st title)
- Runners-up: New Zealand
- Third place: England

Tournament statistics
- Matches played: 55

The 1963 World Netball Tournament was the inaugural Netball World Cup. It was organised by the International Federation of Women's Basketball and Netball Associations. It featured eleven teams playing a series of netball test matches at the Chelsea College of Physical Education in Eastbourne in August 1963. With a team coached by Lorna McConchie, captained by Joyce Brown and also featuring Margaret Caldow and Wilma Ritchie, Australia won the tournament after winning all ten of their matches. In 2005, the 1963 Australia team were inducted into the Sport Australia Hall of Fame. The crucial victory came in Round 6 against the eventual runners up, New Zealand, when they secured a one goal 37–36 victory. The hosts, England, finished as bronze medallists after winning eight of their matches.

== Teams, head coaches and captains ==
Team	Head coach	Captain
Australia	Lorna McConchie	Joyce Brown
Ceylon	Norah Pate	Dasmi De Costa
England	Ellen Marsh	Josephine Higgins
Jamaica	Leila Robinson	Barbara Buckley-Jones
New Zealand	Dixie Cockerton	Pamela Edmonds
Northern Ireland		Pamela Lockett
Scotland	Muriel Getty	Mae Lavery (Rooney)
South Africa		Helen Stadler
Trinidad and Tobago	Lystra Lewis	Phyllis Walker
Wales	Edith Parry ??	Patrica Willett
West Indies		Peggy Ince-Hull

== Match officials ==
Umpires

Umpire	Association
N. Ashworth	South Africa
L. Behrman	South Africa
Dixie Cockerton	New Zealand
R. Gorman	Northern Ireland
L. Hunter	Scotland
Lystra Lewis	Trinidad and Tobago
Lorna McConchie	Australia
M. Morris	Australia
Norah Pate	Ceylon
M. Preston	England
Leila Robinson	Jamaica
B. Stone	New Zealand
M. Wall	England
M. Williams	Wales
M. de Silva	Ceylon

== Matches ==
=== Round 1 ===
Friday, 2 August	Australia	82–12	Ceylon
11:00				Umpires: L. Hunter (Scotland); R. Norman (Northern Ireland)

Friday, 2 August	England	45–42	Jamaica
11:18				Umpires: B. Stone (New Zealand); N. Ashworth (South Africa)

Friday, 2 August	Trinidad and Tobago	58–22	Wales
11:36				Umpires: M. Preston (England)

Friday, 2 August	New Zealand	112–4	Northern Ireland
15:00	Colleen McMaster 86/100 (86%); Judy Blair 26	Stats	M. Green 3 R. Walker 1	Umpires: Leila Robinson (Jamaica); M. Williams (Wales)

Friday, 2 August	South Africa	59–21	Scotland
15:00				Umpires: M. Morris (Australia); Lystra Lewis (Trinidad and Tobago)

=== Round 2 ===
Saturday, 3 August	Australia	70–10	West Indies
10:30				Umpires: M. Williams (Wales); Lystra Lewis (Trinidad and Tobago)

Saturday, 3 August	New Zealand	61–31	Jamaica
10:48				Umpires: M. Wall (England); M. de Silva (Ceylon)

Saturday, 3 August	Scotland	51–16	Northern Ireland
11:06				Umpires: Norah Pate (Ceylon); L. Behrman (South Africa)

Saturday, 3 August	England	72–16	Ceylon
17:00	Betty Burke 40; Valerie Hindmarsh 32		D. Costa 12; Y.Dias 4	Umpires: R. Gorman (Northern Ireland); Leila Robinson (Jamaica)

Saturday, 3 August	Trinidad and Tobago	33–28	South Africa
17:18				Umpires: B. Stone (New Zealand); L. Hunter (Scotland)

=== Round 3 ===
Monday, 5 August	New Zealand	89–9	Ceylon
10:30				Umpires: M. Preston (England); Lystra Lewis (Trinidad and Tobago)

Monday, 5 August	Scotland	47–26	Wales
10:48				Umpires: Leila Robinson (Jamaica); M. Wall (England)

Monday, 5 August	South Africa	35–23	West Indies
11:06	J. Pieterse 24; Helen Stadler 11		U. Campbell 21; C.Marshall 2	Umpires: M. Morris (Australia); R. Gorman (Northern Ireland)

Monday, 5 August	England	30–44	Australia
15:00	Annette Cairncross 15; Valerie Hindmarsh 15		Margaret Caldow 31; Jeanette McIver 13	Umpires: N. Ashworth (South Africa)

Monday, 5 August	Jamaica	61–15	Northern Ireland
15:00				Umpires: L. Hunter (Scotland); B. Stone (New Zealand)

=== Round 4 ===
Tuesday, 6 August	Australia	94–7	Wales
10:30	Jeanette McIver 50; Madeleine Wilson 44		Patricia Willet 6 Yolande Treharne 1	Umpires: N. Ashworth (South Africa)

Tuesday, 6 August	England	29–56	New Zealand
10:48	Valerie Hindmarsh 15; Annette Cairncross 14		Colleen McMaster 44; Judy Blair 12	Umpires: Lystra Lewis (Trinidad and Tobago); R. Gorman (Northern Ireland)

Tuesday, 6 August	Jamaica	42–20	Scotland
11:06	Sinclair 29; Joses 9 H. Edmondson 4		C. Kerrigan 15; M. McCarthy 5	Umpires: Norah Pate (Ceylon); L. Behrman (South Africa)

Tuesday, 6 August	Trinidad and Tobago	59–11	Northern Ireland
15:00	Francis 43; John 16		A. Stone 6 Walker 5	Umpires: M. Preston (Northern Ireland)

Tuesday, 6 August	West Indies	44–21	Ceylon
15:00	U. Campbell 34; Ings 9		Christine Blake 14; I. Sachithanandan 7	Umpires: M. Williams (Wales); M. Morris (Australia)

=== Round 5 ===
Wednesday, 7 August	New Zealand	51–23	Trinidad and Tobago
10:30	Colleen McMaster 41; Judy Blair 10		J. Francis 13; Phyllis Walker 10	Umpires: M. Preston (England); M. Morris (Australia)

Wednesday, 7 August	Ceylon	36–33	Wales
10:48	Christine Blake 21; I. Sachithanandan 15		Patricia Willet 25; Patricia McMinn 8	Umpires: L. Hunter (Scotland)

Wednesday, 7 August	South Africa	54–15	Northern Ireland
11:06	M. Laubacher 28; B. Stadler 26		M. Green 9 A. Stone 7	Umpires: Leila Robinson (Jamaica); M. da Silva (Ceylon)

Wednesday, 7 August	Australia	52–19	Jamaica
15:00	Jeanette McIver 28; Margaret Caldow 24		H. Edmondson 28; C. Sinclair 2	Umpires: M. Williams (Wales); B. Stone (New Zealand)

Wednesday, 7 August	England	49–21	West Indies
15:00				Umpires: Norah Pate (Ceylon); R. Gorman (Northern Ireland)

=== Round 6 ===
Thursday, 8 August	Australia	37–36	New Zealand
10:30				Umpires: M. Preston (England); Leila Robinson (Jamaica)

Thursday, 8 August	Trinidad and Tobago	36–28	Scotland
10:48				Umpires: Norah Pate (Ceylon); N. Ashworth (South Africa)

Thursday, 8 August	West Indies	55–19	Wales
11:06				Umpires: M. Wall (England); R. Gorman (Northern Ireland)

Thursday, 8 August	Jamaica	46–21	Ceylon
17:00				Umpires: M. Williams (Wales); M. Morris (Australia)

Thursday, 8 August	England	47–29	South Africa
17:18				Umpires: Lystra Lewis (Trinidad and Tobago); B. Stone (New Zealand)

=== Round 7 ===
Friday, 9 August	Ceylon	42–29	Northern Ireland
10:30	I. Sachithanandan 26; Christine Blake 16		A. Stone 16; M. Green 13	Umpires: N. Ashworth (South Africa); Dixie Cockerton (New Zealand)

Friday, 9 August	England	63–17	Scotland
10:48	Valerie Hindmarsh 41; Betty Burke 22		C. Kerrigan 11; M. McCarthy 6	Umpires: Lystra Lewis (Trinidad and Tobago); M. Williams (Wales)

Friday, 9 August	Jamaica	42–24	West Indies
11:06	H. Edmondson 29; B. Jones 13		U. Campbell 17; C. Marshall 7	Umpires: M. Morris (Australia); B. Stone (New Zealand)

Friday, 9 August	South Africa	86–18	Wales
15:00	J. Pieterse 74; Laubscher 12		Patricia Willet 13; Kay Morris 5	Umpires: M. Wall (England)

Friday, 9 August	Australia	34–12	Trinidad and Tobago
15:00	Madeleine Wilson 27; Jeanette McIver 7		J. Francis 6 Phyllis Walker 6	Umpires: Leila Robinson (Jamaica)

=== Round 8 ===
Saturday, 10 August	Australia	56–12	Scotland
10:30	Margaret Caldow 32; Madeleine Wilson 24		Kerrogan 9 McCartny 3	Umpires: Lystra Lewis (Trinidad and Tobago); L. Behrman (South Africa)

Saturday, 10 August	West Indies	40–13	Northern Ireland
10:48	Campbell 30; Ince 10		Stone 8 Green 5	Umpires: B. Stone (New Zealand); Norah Pate (Ceylon)

Saturday, 10 August	England	74–7	Wales
11:06	Valerie Hindmarsh 47; Betty Burke 27		Kay Morris 4 Patrica Willett 3	Umpires: M. de Silva (Ceylon); Leila Robinson (Jamaica)

Saturday, 10 August	Trinidad and Tobago	45–23	Ceylon
17:00	Francis 23; John 22		Christine Blake 15; I. Sachithanandan 8	Umpires: R. Gorman (Northern Ireland); Lorna McConchie (Australia)

Saturday, 10 August	New Zealand	60–13	South Africa
17:18	Colleen McMaster 47; Judy Blair 13		J. Pieterse 7 Lauscher 6	Umpires: M. Preston (England)

=== Round 9 ===
Monday, 12 August	New Zealand	85–7	Scotland
10:30	Moananui 66			Umpires: Leila Robinson (Jamaica); M. Wall (England)

Monday, 12 August	South Africa	48–26	Ceylon
10:48				Umpires: M. Williams (Wales); M. Morris (Australia)

Monday, 12 August	Trinidad and Tobago	30–27	West Indies
11:06				Umpires: M. Preston (England); R. Gorman (Northern Ireland)

Monday, 12 August	Australia	93–5	Northern Ireland
15:00				Umpires: Lystra Lewis (Trinidad and Tobago); N. Ashworth (South Africa)

Monday, 12 August	Jamaica	43–20	Wales
15:00				Umpires: L. Hunter (Scotland); Norah Pate (Ceylon)

=== Round 10 ===
Tuesday, 13 August	Trinidad and Tobago	28–24	Jamaica
10:30				Umpires: B. Stone (New Zealand); R. Gorman (Northern Ireland)

Tuesday, 13 August	West Indies	34–33	Scotland
10:48				Umpires: M. de Silva (Ceylon); Dixie Cockerton (New Zealand)

Tuesday, 13 August	Australia	67–28	South Africa
11:06				Umpires: M. Wall (England); M. Williams (Wales)

Tuesday, 13 August	England	82–15	Northern Ireland
15:00				Umpires: L. Hunter (Scotland)

Tuesday, 13 August	New Zealand	88–15	Wales
15:00				Umpires: L. Robinston (Jamaica); M. Morris (Australia)

=== Round 11 ===
Wednesday, 14 August	England	46–18	Trinidad and Tobago
10:30				Umpires: L. Hunter (Scotland); Dixie Cockerton (New Zealand)

Wednesday, 14 August	New Zealand	73–23	West Indies
10:48				Umpires: M. Morris (Australia); N. Ashworth (South Africa)

Wednesday, 14 August	Wales	53–26	Northern Ireland
11:06				Umpires: Norah Pate (Ceylon); Leila Robinson (Jamaica)

Wednesday, 14 August	Scotland	39–34	Ceylon
15:00				Umpires: Lystra Lewis (Trinidad and Tobago)

Wednesday, 14 August	Jamaica	46–27	South Africa
15:00				Umpires: M. Preston (England); M. Williams (Wales)

== Final table ==
Pos	Team	P	W	D	L	GF	GA	GD	Pts
1st place, gold medalist(s)	Australia	10	10	0	0	629	171	+458	20
2nd place, silver medalist(s)	New Zealand	10	9	0	1	711	191	+520	18
3rd place, bronze medalist(s)	England	10	8	0	2	537	265	+272	16
4	Trinidad and Tobago	10	7	0	3	342	294	+48	14
5	Jamaica	10	6	0	4	396	313	+83	12
6	South Africa	10	5	0	5	407	356	+51	10
7	West Indies	10	4	0	6	301	385	-84	8
8	Scotland	10	3	0	7	275	451	-176	6
9	Ceylon	10	2	0	8	240	527	-287	4
10	Wales	10	1	0	9	220	607	-387	2
11	Northern Ireland	10	0	0	10	149	647	-498	0

== Medallists ==
Gold	Silver	Bronze
Australia; Coach: Lorna McConchie	New Zealand; Coach: Dixie Cockerton	England; Coach: Ellen Marsh
Joyce Brown (c); Margaret Caldow; Valerie Eaton; Corrin Fleming; Annette Foley; Jeanette McIver; June Noseda; Wilma Ritchie; Ingrid Tough; Madeleine Wilson (vc)	Lesley Baker; Judy Blair; Pamela Edmonds (c); Rebecca Faulkner; Joan Martin; Colleen McMaster; Betty McNamara; Lois Muir (vc); Elva Simpson; Mirth Te Moananui	Kathleen Bays; Betty Burke; Annette Cairncross; Margaret Eve; Blanche Fidler; Jean Heath; Josephine Higgins (c); Valerie Hindmarsh; Judith Iddon; Patricia Spratt; Anne Stephenson (vc); Pat Wells
