= New Zealand national netball team =

National netball team

New Zealand
- Nickname(s): Silver Ferns
- Association: Netball New Zealand
- Confederation: Oceania Netball Federation
- Head coach: Noeline Taurua
- Asst coach: Briony Akle
- Captain: Karin Burger
- Most caps: Laura Langman (163)
- World ranking: 2
Team colours

First international
- Australia 40–11 New Zealand; Royal Park, Melbourne, 20 August 1938

Netball World Cup
- Appearances: 15 (Debuted in 1963)
- 2023 placing: 4th
- Best result: 1st (1967, 1979, 1987, 2003, 2019)

Commonwealth Games
- Appearances: 8 (Debuted in 1990)
- 2026 placing: 1st
- Best result: 1st (2006, 2010, 2026)

The New Zealand national netball team, commonly known as the Silver Ferns (Māori: Rau Hiriwā or Kaponga), represent Netball New Zealand in international netball tournaments such as the Netball World Cup, the Commonwealth Games, the Taini Jamison Trophy, the Constellation Cup, the Netball Quad Series and the Fast5 Netball World Series. They have also represented New Zealand at the World Games. New Zealand made their test debut in 1938. As of 2023, New Zealand have been world champions on five occasions and Commonwealth champions twice. They are regularly ranked number two in the World Netball Rankings.

== History ==
=== Formation and early years ===
On 20 August 1938, New Zealand, captained by Margaret Matangi, made their test debut in an away match against at Australia at Royal Park, Melbourne. Australia defeated New Zealand 40–11. This was the first netball Test between Australia and New Zealand. It was also the world's first international netball match. On 20 August 1948, New Zealand, captained by Oonah Shannahan, hosted their first home test against Australia at Forbury Park. Australia defeated New Zealand 27–16.

=== Rivalry with Australia ===
New Zealand's main rivals in international netball are Australia. Between 1963 and 2015, the two teams dominated the World Netball Championships and Commonwealth Games tournaments. Since 2010 the two teams have also competed for the Constellation Cup. Notable and memorable clashes have included the finals of the 1991, 1999 and 2011 World Netball Championships, the finals of the 2010 and the 2014 Commonwealth Games and the final match of the 2013 Constellation Cup.

=== World Netball Rankings ===
New Zealand are regularly ranked number two in the World Netball Rankings. In January 2011, after winning the 2010 Commonwealth Games tournament, they replaced Australia at the top of the rankings for the first time. In 2013 they were again ranked number one. After finishing fourth at the 2018 Commonwealth Games, New Zealand dropped, for the first time in their history, to third. In July 2019, they dropped to fourth. However, after winning the 2019 Netball World Cup, they moved back up to second.

== Tournament history ==
=== Netball World Cup ===
New Zealand have competed at every Netball World Cup since the inaugural 1963 tournament. At the 1963 tournament, New Zealand were captained by Pamela Edwards, with Lois Muir as vice-captain. Australia defeated New Zealand 37–36 in a closely contested final. After winning the 1967 World Netball Tournament, New Zealand were world champions for the first time. The team was coached by Taini Jamison and captained by Judy Blair. In the final they beat Australia 40–43. Joan Harnett emerged as the star for New Zealand and was named player of the tournament. In 1996 the team was inducted into the New Zealand Sports Hall of Fame.

At the 1979 World Netball Tournament, New Zealand shared the gold medal with Australia and Trinidad and Tobago. After winning the 1987 World Netball Tournament, with a team coached by Lois Muir and captained by Leigh Gibbs, New Zealand were world champions for a third time. New Zealand were dominant in group play, winning all eight matches. That saw them advance to a final round with Australia, England and Trinidad and Tobago. New Zealand were the only team to win all three of their games and were subsequently declared world champions. In 1996, the 1987 team was also inducted into the New Zealand Sports Hall of Fame.

At the 2003 World Netball Championships, with a team captained by Anna Rowberry, New Zealand won their fourth title. In the final they defeated Australia 49–47. At the 2003 Halberg Awards, the Silver Ferns won both the main award and were named Team of the Year. Their head coach, Ruth Aitken, was named Coach of the Year and Irene van Dyk, who scored 41 from 43 in the final, was named Sportswoman of the Year.

New Zealand were world champions for a fifth time when, with a team captained by Laura Langman and featuring Casey Kopua and Maria Folau, they won the 2019 Netball World Cup. In just fourteen months, head coach Noeline Taurua turned a team, demoralised at missing out on a medal at the 2018 Commonwealth Games, into world champions. New Zealand rebounded from a round robin defeat to Australia to defeat them 52–51 in the final. At the 2019 Halberg Awards, the Silver Ferns won both the Halberg Award Supreme and were named Team of the Year. Winning the 2019 Netball World Cup was declared New Zealand's Favourite Sports Moment and Taurua, was named Coach of the Year. The team were also awarded the 2019 Lonsdale Cup.

Tournaments	Place
1963 World Netball Tournament	2nd place, silver medalist(s)
1967 World Netball Tournament	1st place, gold medalist(s)
1971 World Netball Tournament	2nd place, silver medalist(s)
1975 World Netball Tournament	3rd place, bronze medalist(s)
1979 World Netball Tournament	1st place, gold medalist(s)
1983 World Netball Tournament	2nd place, silver medalist(s)
1987 World Netball Tournament	1st place, gold medalist(s)
1991 World Netball Championships	2nd place, silver medalist(s)
1995 World Netball Championships	3rd place, bronze medalist(s)
1999 World Netball Championships	2nd place, silver medalist(s)
2003 World Netball Championships	1st place, gold medalist(s)
2007 World Netball Championships	2nd place, silver medalist(s)
2011 World Netball Championships	2nd place, silver medalist(s)
2015 Netball World Cup	2nd place, silver medalist(s)
2019 Netball World Cup	1st place, gold medalist(s)
2023 Netball World Cup	4th
2027 Netball World Cup	

=== World Games ===
Between 1985 and 1993, New Zealand competed at the World Games, winning two gold and one silver medals. With a team captained by Lyn Parker, New Zealand defeated Australia 39–37 in the final to win the inaugural title. At the 1989 tournament, a New Zealand team captained by Waimarama Taumaunu, defeated Australia 33–29. At the 1989 Halberg Awards, the Silver Ferns were named Team of the Year and their head coach, Lyn Parker, was named Coach of the Year.

Tournaments	Place
1985 World Games	1st place, gold medalist(s)
1989 World Games	1st place, gold medalist(s)
1993 World Games	2nd place, silver medalist(s)

=== Commonwealth Games ===
New Zealand has competed at every netball tournament at the Commonwealth Games. In 1990 they lost to Australia in a one-off match when netball was a demonstration sport. Between 1998 and 2014 they played in every tournament final, winning two gold and three silver medals. In 2006 New Zealand won the gold medal for the first time with a 60–55 win over Australia. In 2010, New Zealand, led by Maria Tutaia and Irene van Dyk, won their second gold medal after they defeated Australia 66–64 in an epic encounter. Tutaia scored the winning goal in double extra time after 84 minutes of play. The Silver Ferns were also awarded the 2010 Lonsdale Cup. In 2026 New Zealand defeated Jamaica in the final to claim their first Commonwealth gold medal in 16 years.

Tournaments	Place
1990 Commonwealth Games	2nd
1998 Commonwealth Games	2nd place, silver medalist(s)
2002 Commonwealth Games	2nd place, silver medalist(s)
2006 Commonwealth Games	1st place, gold medalist(s)
2010 Commonwealth Games	1st place, gold medalist(s)
2014 Commonwealth Games	2nd place, silver medalist(s)
2018 Commonwealth Games	4th
2022 Commonwealth Games	3rd place, bronze medalist(s)
2026 Commonwealth Games	1st place, gold medalist(s)

=== Taini Jamison Trophy ===
Since 2008, Netball New Zealand has hosted the Taini Jamison Trophy. The trophy is contested with visiting teams, other than Australia. Teams to compete have included England, Jamaica, South Africa, Malawi, Fiji and Samoa.

Tournaments	Place
2008 Taini Jamison Trophy Series	1st place, gold medalist(s)
2009 Taini Jamison Trophy Series	2nd place, silver medalist(s)
2010 Taini Jamison Trophy Series	1st place, gold medalist(s)
2011 Taini Jamison Trophy Series	1st place, gold medalist(s)
2013 Taini Jamison Trophy Series	1st place, gold medalist(s)
2014 Taini Jamison Trophy Series	1st place, gold medalist(s)
2015 Taini Jamison Trophy Series	1st place, gold medalist(s)
2016 Taini Jamison Trophy Series	1st place, gold medalist(s)
2017 Taini Jamison Trophy Series	1st place, gold medalist(s)
2018 Taini Jamison Trophy Series	2nd place, silver medalist(s)
2020 Taini Jamison Trophy Series	1st place, gold medalist(s)
2021 Taini Jamison Trophy Series	2nd place, silver medalist(s)
2022 Taini Jamison Trophy Series	1st place, gold medalist(s)
2023 Taini Jamison Trophy Series	1st place, gold medalist(s)
2024 Taini Jamison Trophy Series	2nd place, silver medalist(s)
2025 Taini Jamison Trophy Series	1st place, gold medalist(s)

=== Constellation Cup ===
Since 2010, New Zealand and Australia have competed for the Constellation Cup. New Zealand won the trophy for the first time in 2012 and for a second time in 2021.

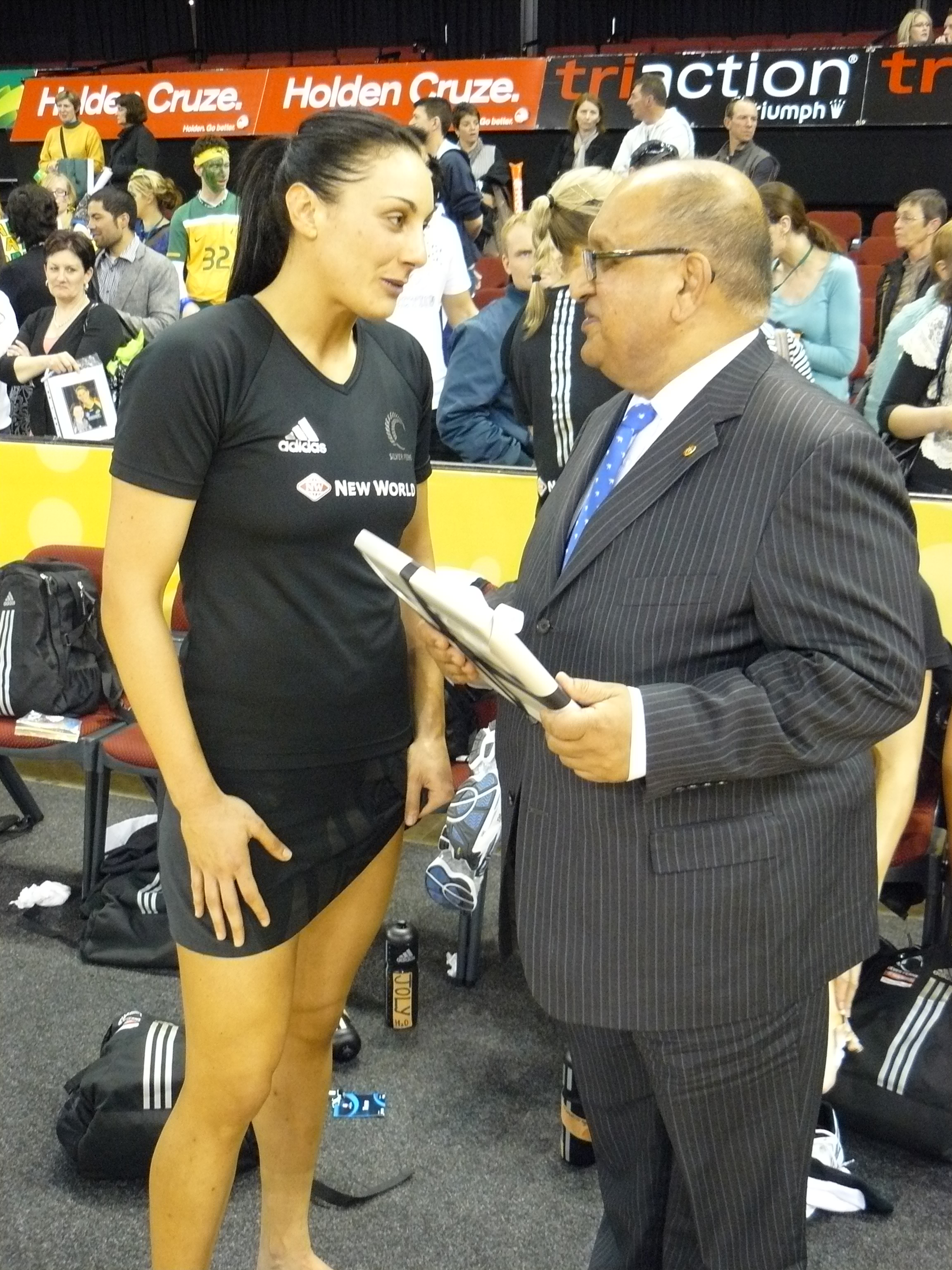
29 August 2010; The Governor-General of New Zealand, Rt Hon Sir Anand Satyanand, talks to New Zealand's Joline Henry during the 2010 Constellation Cup series.

Tournaments	Place
2010 Constellation Cup	2nd place, silver medalist(s)
2011 Constellation Cup	2nd place, silver medalist(s)
2012 Constellation Cup	1st place, gold medalist(s)
2013 Constellation Cup	2nd place, silver medalist(s)
2014 Constellation Cup	2nd place, silver medalist(s)
2015 Constellation Cup	2nd place, silver medalist(s)
2016 Constellation Cup	2nd place, silver medalist(s)
2017 Constellation Cup	2nd place, silver medalist(s)
2018 Constellation Cup	2nd place, silver medalist(s)
2019 Constellation Cup	2nd place, silver medalist(s)
2021 Constellation Cup	1st place, gold medalist(s)
2022 Constellation Cup	2nd place, silver medalist(s)
2023 Constellation Cup	2nd place, silver medalist(s)
2024 Constellation Cup	1st place, gold medalist(s)
2025 Constellation Cup	2nd place, silver medalist(s)

=== Netball Quad Series/Netball Nations Cup ===
Since 2012, New Zealand have competed in the Netball Quad Series, playing against Australia, England and South Africa. The Silver Ferns won their first Quad Series title in September 2017. In 2020, the Quad Series was briefly replaced by a Nations Cup tournament. New Zealand won this tournament.

Tournaments	Place
2012 Netball Quad Series	2nd place, silver medalist(s)
2016 Netball Quad Series	2nd place, silver medalist(s)
2017 Netball Quad Series (January/February)	2nd place, silver medalist(s)
2017 Netball Quad Series (August/September)	1st place, gold medalist(s)
2018 Netball Quad Series (January)	3rd place, bronze medalist(s)
2018 Netball Quad Series (September)	3rd place, bronze medalist(s)
2019 Netball Quad Series	3rd place, bronze medalist(s)
2020 Netball Nations Cup	1st place, gold medalist(s)
2022 Netball Quad Series	3rd place, bronze medalist(s)
2023 Netball Quad Series	2nd place, silver medalist(s)
2024 Netball Nations Cup	3rd place, bronze medalist(s)

=== Fast5 Netball World Series ===
Since 2009, the Fast5 Ferns have played in the Fast5 Netball World Series. They have been the dominant team in the series. Between 2009 and 2018, they won seven of the nine tournaments played.

Tournaments	Place
2009 World Netball Series	1st place, gold medalist(s)
2010 World Netball Series	1st place, gold medalist(s)
2011 World Netball Series	2nd place, silver medalist(s)
2012 Fast5 Netball World Series	1st place, gold medalist(s)
2013 Fast5 Netball World Series	1st place, gold medalist(s)
2014 Fast5 Netball World Series	1st place, gold medalist(s)
2016 Fast5 Netball World Series	1st place, gold medalist(s)
2017 Fast5 Netball World Series	4th
2018 Fast5 Netball World Series	1st place, gold medalist(s)
2022 Fast5 Netball World Series	3rd place, bronze medalist(s)
2023 Fast5 Netball World Series	2nd place, silver medalist(s)
2024 Fast5 Netball World Series	2nd place, silver medalist(s)

== Players ==
=== Current squad ===
The current squad was selected for the 2025 Constellation Cup.

New Zealand roster
Players
Coaches

Name	Pos	DOB	Height	Club	Nat	Caps
Karin Burger (c)	WD, GD, GK	12 April 1993 (aged 32)	1.84 m (6 ft 0 in)	Mainland Tactix	(New Zealand)
Maddy Gordon	C, WA, WD	16 January 2000 (aged 25)	1.74 m (5 ft 9 in)	Central Pulse	(New Zealand)
Catherine Hall	GK,GD	16 December 2003 (aged 21)	1.91 m (6 ft 3 in)	Northern Mystics	(New Zealand)
Georgia Heffernan	GS, GA	7 October 1999 (aged 26)	1.81 m (5 ft 11 in)	Southern Steel	(New Zealand)
Kate Heffernan	WD, C, WA	7 October 1999 (aged 26)	1.81 m (5 ft 11 in)	Southern Steel	(New Zealand)
Kelly Jackson (vc)	GK, GD	22 October 1996 (aged 28)	1.92 m (6 ft 4 in)	Central Pulse	(New Zealand)
Paris Mason	GK, GD, WD	13 December 2002 (aged 22)	1.84 m (6 ft 0 in)	Central Pulse	(New Zealand)
Grace Nweke	GS	7 February 2002 (aged 23)	1.93 m (6 ft 4 in)	New South Wales Swifts	(Australia)
Kimiora Poi	C, WA	1 November 1997 (aged 27)	1.68 m (5 ft 6 in)	Southern Steel	(New Zealand)
Mila Reulu-Buchanan	C, WA	11 May 1998 (aged 27)	1.73 m (5 ft 8 in)	Northern Stars	(New Zealand)
Martina Salmon	GS, GA		1.90 m (6 ft 3 in)	Mainland Tactix	(New Zealand)
Carys Stythe	GD, GK	June 18, 2003 (aged 22)	1.92 m (6 ft 4 in)	Southern Steel	(New Zealand)
Elisapeta Toeava	WA, C	10 March 1994 (aged 31)	1.61 m (5 ft 3 in)	Northern Mystics	(New Zealand)
Amelia Walmsley	GS, GA	31 January 2004 (aged 21)	1.92 m (6 ft 4 in)	Central Pulse	(New Zealand)

Head coach

- Yvette McCausland-Durie

Assistant coach

- Liana Leota

Notes

- (c) – Captain
- (cc) – Co-captain
- (vc) – Vice-captain
- – Injury / maternity leave
- (TRP) – Temporary Replacement Player

=== Notable past players ===
==== Most-capped internationals ====
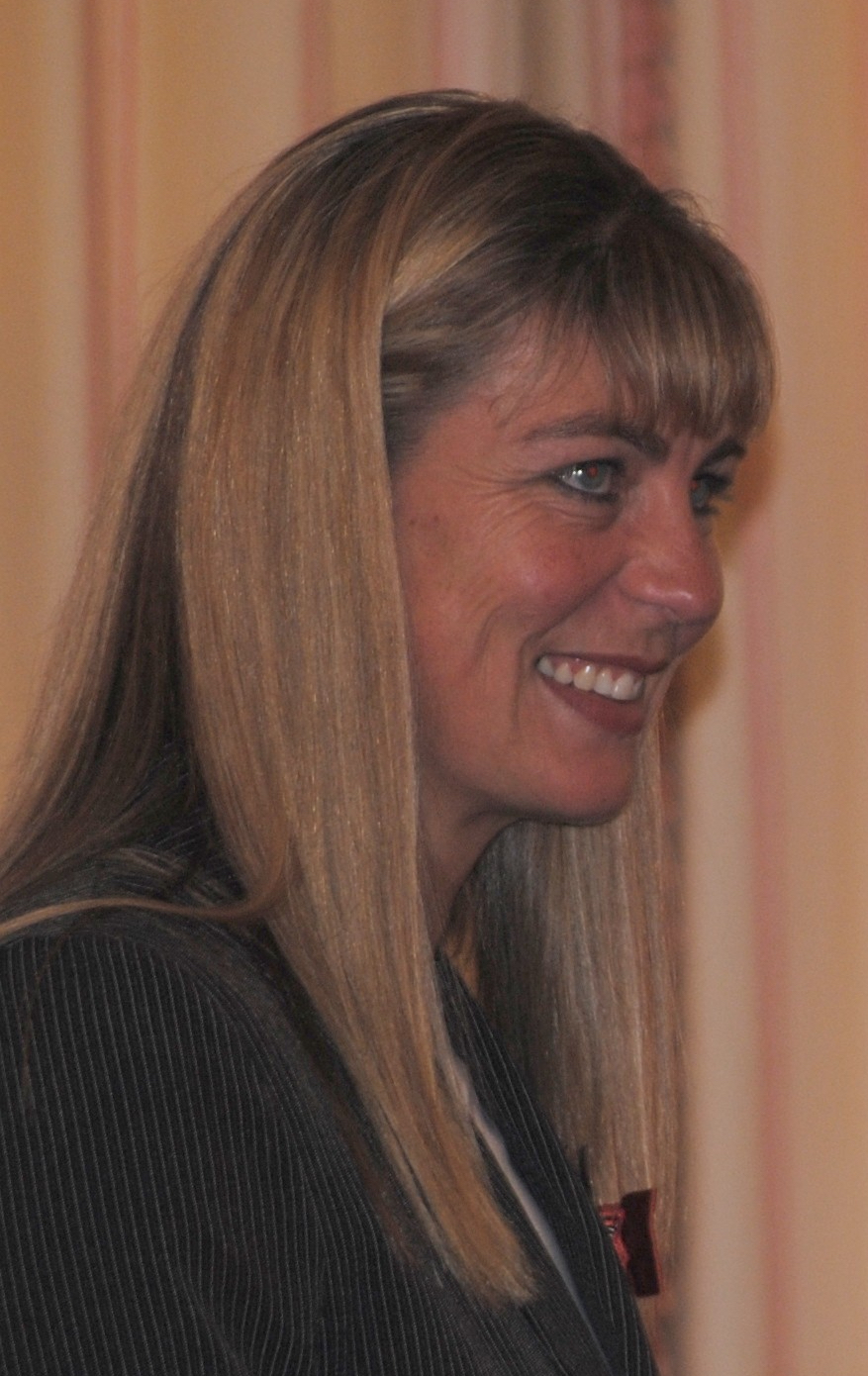
Irene van Dyk made 145 appearances for New Zealand between 2000 and 2014.

Player	Appearances	Years
Laura Langman	165	2005–2020
Maria Folau	150	2005–2019
Irene van Dyk	145	2000–2014
Katrina Rore	137	2008–2022
Casey Kopua (née Williams)	135	2005–2019
Lesley Rumball	110	1994–2005
Leana de Bruin	104	2003–2016

==== New Zealand Sports Hall of Fame ====
The following New Zealand netball internationals have been inducted into the New Zealand Sports Hall of Fame.

Inducted	Player	Appearances	Years
1990	Joan Harnett	26	1963–1971
1993	Lois Muir	13	1960–1964
1996	Waimarama Taumaunu	77	1981–1991
1999	Rita Fatialofa	45	1982–1989
2001	Sandra Edge	89	1985–1995
2016	Lesley Rumball	110	1994–2005

==== Selected captains ====
The following New Zealand netball internationals captained the team when they won the gold medal at the Netball World Cup, the Commonwealth Games and the World Games.

Captains	Tournaments
Judy Blair	1967 World Netball Tournament
Lyn Gunson	1979 World Netball Championships; 1985 World Games
Leigh Gibbs	1987 World Netball Championships
Waimarama Taumaunu	1989 World Games
Anna Rowberry	2003 World Netball Championships
Adine Wilson	2006 Commonwealth Games
Casey Kopua (née Williams)	2010 Commonwealth Games
Laura Langman	2019 Netball World Cup

== Head coaches ==
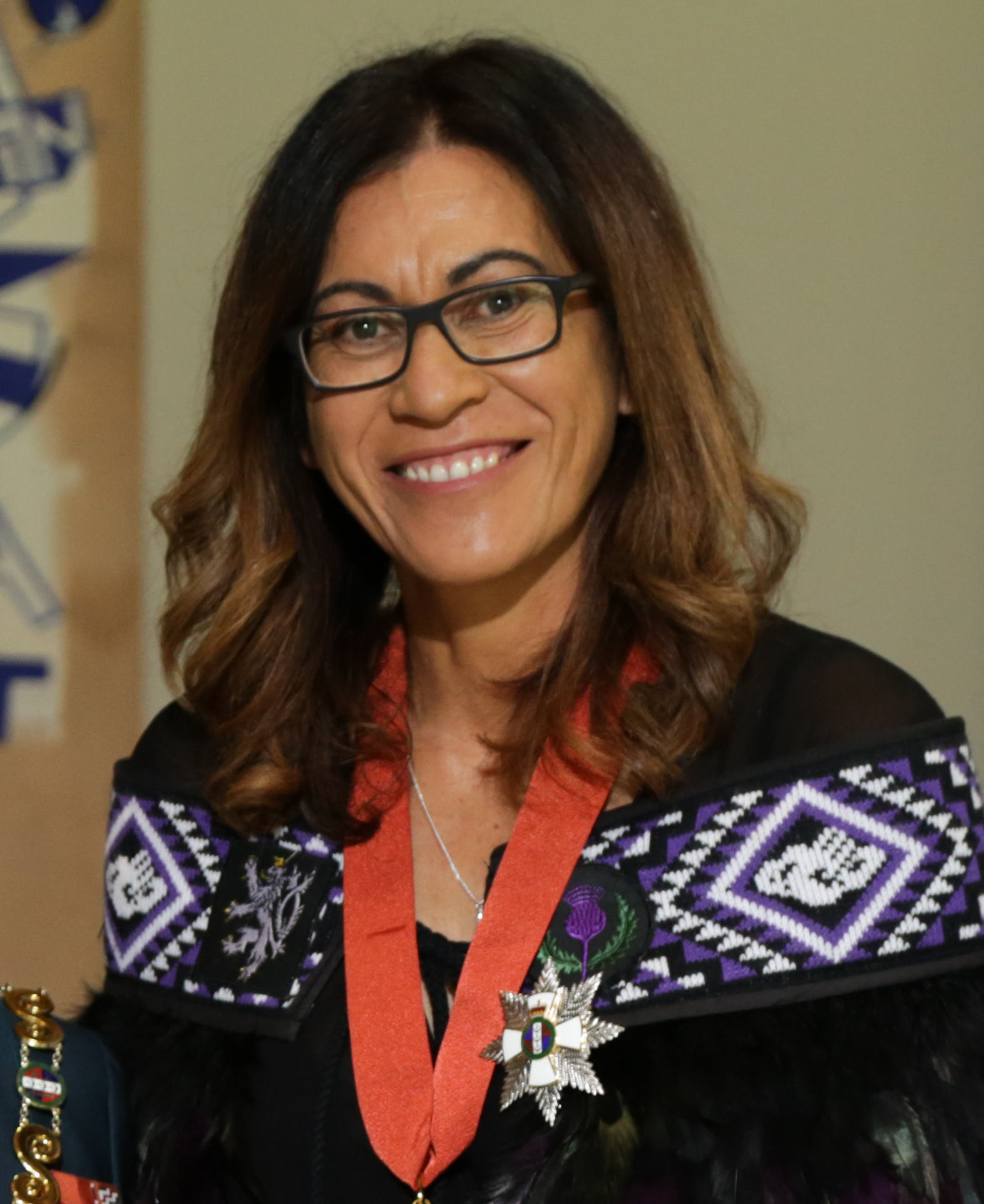
Current head coach, Noeline Taurua, made 34 appearances as a player for New Zealand between 1994 and 1999.

Coach	Years
Myrtle Muir	1938–1948
Dixie Cockerton	1960–1963
Taini Jamison	1967–1971
Lois Muir	1974–1988
Lyn Gunson	1989–1993
Leigh Gibbs	1994–1997
Yvonne Willering	1997–2001
Ruth Aitken	2002–2011
Waimarama Taumaunu	2011–2015
Janine Southby	2015–2018
Noeline Taurua	2018–

== Honours ==
- Netball World Cup
  - Winners: 1967, 1979, 1987, 2003, 2019
  - Runners up: 1963, 1971, 1983, 1991, 1999, 2007, 2011, 2015
- Commonwealth Games
  - Winners: 2006, 2010, 2026
  - Runners Up: 1998, 2002, 2014
- Taini Jamison Trophy
  - Winners: 2008, 2010, 2011, 2013, 2014, 2015, 2016, 2017, 2020, 2021, 2022, 2023, 2025
  - Runners Up: 2009, 2018, 2021, 2024
- Constellation Cup
  - Winners: 2012, 2021, 2024
  - Runners Up: 2010, 2011, 2013, 2014, 2015, 2016, 2017, 2018, 2019, 2022, 2023
- Netball Quad Series/Netball Nations Cup
  - Winners: 2017 (August/September), 2020
  - Runners Up: 2012, 2016, 2017 (January/February), 2023
- World Games
  - Winners: 1985, 1989: 2
  - Runners up: 1993
- Fast5 Netball World Series
  - Winners: 2009, 2010, 2012, 2013, 2014, 2016, 2018
  - Runners up: 2011, 2023
- Lonsdale Cup
  - Winners: 2010, 2019
- Halberg Awards – Supreme Award
  - Winners: 2003, 2019
- Halberg Awards – Team of the Year
  - Winners: 1989, 2003, 2019
- New Zealand Sports Hall of Fame
  - Inductees: 1967, 1987
