= Netball World Cup =

International netball competition

- Current season, competition or edition: 2023 Netball World Cup
- Formerly: World Netball Championships (1963–2011)
- Sport: Netball
- Founded: 1963; 63 years ago
- First season: 1963
- Administrator: World Netball
- No. of teams: 16 teams (2023)
- Most recent champion: Australia (12th title)
- Most titles: Australia (12 titles)

The Netball World Cup is a quadrennial international netball world championship organised by World Netball, inaugurated in 1963. Since its inception the competition has been dominated primarily by the Australia national netball team and the New Zealand national netball team, Trinidad and Tobago is the only other team to have won a title (a three-way tie in the 1979 championship). The most recent tournament was the 2023 Netball World Cup in Cape Town, South Africa, which was won by Australia.

== History ==
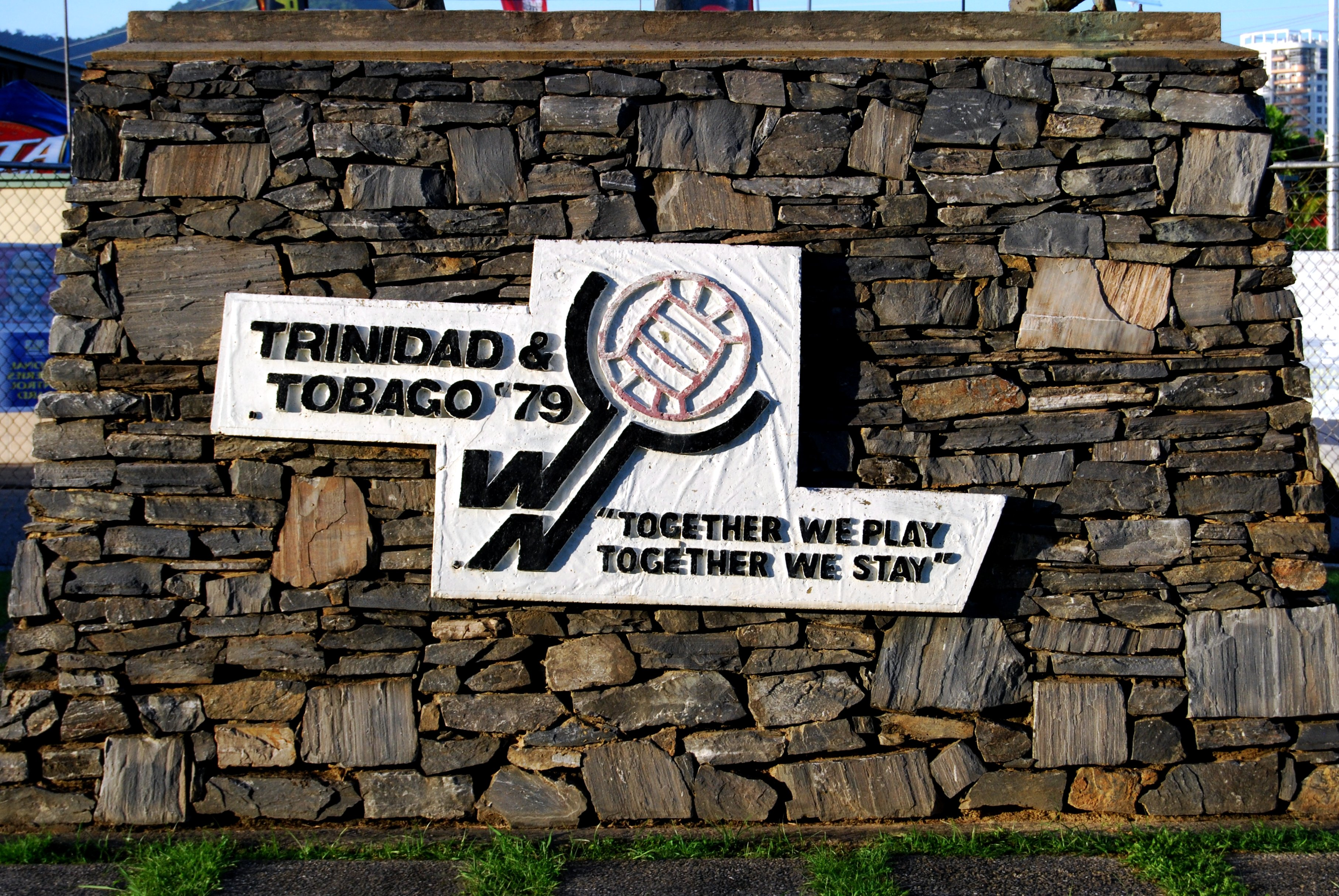
Sign commemorating the 1979 World Netball Championships, held in Port of Spain, Trinidad and Tobago.

In 1960, representatives from Australia, England, New Zealand, South Africa and the West Indies met to discuss standardising the rules of the sport. This led to the establishment of the International Federation of Women's Basketball and Netball (which later became the International Federation of Netball Associations). Formal rules were established at this inaugural meeting and a decision to hold World Championship tournaments every four years was also made. The first World Netball Championship was held in 1963 and was hosted by England. The tournament was renamed to the World Cup as opposed to "Championships" in 2015. Since 1991 the tournament has maintained a format allowing semi-finals and finals matches to be played, where previously the tournament held no finals and instead utilised the round-robin system, which occasionally led to more than one nation being crowned world champions.

Australia or New Zealand have won all of the titles, though emerging netball nations England, South Africa and Jamaica have come close to dislodging the top-tier nations on several occasions. In 1979 Australia, New Zealand and Trinidad and Tobago were all joint champions. South Africa finished runners-up in 1995, England too in 2023. Jamaica have contested several bronze medal matches and come up short in narrow semi-final defeats. The reigning world champions are Australia, who defeated England in the 2023 final. They will defend their title in Sydney, Australia in 2027.

From 2027 onwards, the tournament will be held in a two-year cycle interval ahead of the inaugural Men’s Netball World Cup.

== Results ==
=== Tournament history ===
Ed.	Year	Host	First/Second place			Third/Fourth place			Num. teams
Ed.	Year	Host	(gold) Champion	Score	(silver) Runner-up	(bronze) Third	Score	Fourth	Num. teams
1	1963	England	Australia	Round-robin; Eastbourne	New Zealand	England	Round-robin; Eastbourne	Trinidad and Tobago	11
2	1967	Australia	New Zealand	Round-robin; Matthews Netball Centre, Perth	Australia	South Africa	Round-robin; Matthews Netball Centre, Perth	England	8
3	1971	Jamaica	Australia	Round-robin; National Stadium, Kingston	New Zealand	England	Round-robin; National Stadium, Kingston	Jamaica (Note: Fourth place was shared because there were no finals: both teams won four of their eight matches, losing three times and drawing against each other. The tournament rules of the time did not provide any way of determining an outright winner.) Trinidad and Tobago	9
4	1975	New Zealand	Australia	Round-robin; Windmill Road, Auckland	England	New Zealand	Round-robin; Windmill Road, Auckland	Trinidad and Tobago	11
5	1979	Trinidad and Tobago	Australia (Note: The title was shared because there were no finals: the top 10 teams played off in a round robin. Each of the top three teams won eight out of nine matches, losing once to one of the other two. The tournament rules of the time did not provide any way of determining an outright winner.) New Zealand Trinidad and Tobago	Round-robin; West Park Complex, Port of Spain	—N/a	—N/a	Round-robin; West Park Complex, Port of Spain	England	19
6	1983	Singapore	Australia	Round-robin; National University, Singapore	New Zealand	Trinidad and Tobago	Round-robin; National University, Singapore	England	14
7	1987	Scotland	New Zealand	Round-robin; Crownpoint Sports Park, Glasgow	Australia (Note: There were no finals: the top 4 teams played a round-robin tournament. Australia and Trinidad & Tobago ended the tournament with one win (against England), one loss (to New Zealand) and one draw (with each other). The tournament rules of the time did not provide any way to break this tie.) Trinidad and Tobago	—N/a	Round-robin; Crownpoint Sports Park, Glasgow	England	17
8	1991	Australia	Australia	53–52; Sydney Entertainment Centre, Sydney	New Zealand	Jamaica	63–54; Sydney Entertainment Centre, Sydney	England	20
9	1995	England	Australia	68–48; National Indoor Arena, Birmingham	South Africa	New Zealand	60–31; National Indoor Arena, Birmingham	England	27
10	1999	New Zealand	Australia	42–41; Westpac Trust Centre, Christchurch	New Zealand	England	57–43; Westpac Trust Centre, Christchurch	Jamaica	26
11	2003	Jamaica	New Zealand	49–47; National Indoor Stadium, Kingston	Australia	Jamaica	46–40; National Indoor Stadium, Kingston	England	24
12	2007 (Note: Suva, Fiji was scheduled to host the 2007 competition but was stripped of hosting rights following the December 2006 coup. The hosting rights were subsequently awarded to Auckland, New Zealand, and the competition date moved from July to November 2007.)	New Zealand	Australia	42–38; Trusts Stadium, Auckland	New Zealand	Jamaica	53–52; Trusts Stadium, Auckland	England	16
13	2011	Singapore	Australia	58–57; Singapore Indoor Stadium, Kallang	New Zealand	England	70–49; Singapore Indoor Stadium, Kallang	Jamaica	16
14	2015	Australia	Australia	58–55; Allphones Arena, Sydney Olympic Park	New Zealand	England	66–44; Allphones Arena, Sydney Olympic Park	Jamaica	16
15	2019	England	New Zealand	52–51; Liverpool Arena, Liverpool	Australia	England	58–42; Liverpool Arena, Liverpool	South Africa	16
16	2023	South Africa	Australia	61–45; Cape Town International Convention Centre, Cape Town	England	Jamaica	52–45; Cape Town International Convention Centre, Cape Town	New Zealand	16
17	2027	Australia	—N/a	Sydney SuperDome, Sydney Olympic Park	—N/a	—N/a	Sydney SuperDome, Sydney Olympic Park	—N/a	16

=== Performance of nations ===
Team	Champions	Runners-up	Third	Fourth	Apps in top six
Australia	12 (1963, 1971, 1975, 1979, 1983, 1991, 1995, 1999, 2007, 2011, 2015, 2023)	4 (1967, 1987, 2003, 2019)	—N/a	—N/a	16
New Zealand	5 (1967, 1979, 1987, 2003, 2019)	8 (1963, 1971, 1983, 1991, 1999, 2007, 2011, 2015)	2 (1975, 1991)	1 (2023)	16
Trinidad and Tobago	1 (1979)	1 (1987)	1 (1983)	3 (1963, 1971, 1975)	8
England	—N/a	2 (1975, 2023)	6 (1963, 1971, 1999, 2011, 2015, 2019)	8 (1967, 1979, 1983, 1987, 1991, 1995)	16
South Africa	—N/a	1 (1995)	1 (1967)	1 (2019)	10
Jamaica	—N/a	—N/a	4 (1991, 2003, 2007, 2023)	4 (1971, 1999, 2011, 2015)	16

=== Participating nations ===
Appeared at every World Cup 10 or more appearances 5 or more appearances One or more appearances Participated in qualifying tournaments, but did not qualify Appearances by countries/teams which no longer exist are not shown.

Team	(England) 1963	(Australia) 1967	(Jamaica) 1971	(New Zealand) 1975	(Trinidad and Tobago) 1979	(Singapore) 1983	(Scotland) 1987	(Australia) 1991	(England) 1995	(New Zealand) 1999	(Jamaica) 2003	(New Zealand) 2007	(Singapore) 2011	(Australia) 2015	(England) 2019	(South Africa) 2023	(Australia) 2027	Total
Antigua and Barbuda	-	-	-	-	12th	9th	-	-	12th	-	17th	-	-	-	-	-	-	4
Australia	1st	2nd	1st	1st	=1st	1st	=2nd	1st	1st	1st	2nd	1st	1st	1st	2nd	1st	Q	17
Bahamas	-	-	9th	-	18th	-	-	-	-	-	-	-	-	-	-	-	-	2
Barbados	-	-	-	-	6th	-	=6th	-	11th	10th	7th	13th	11th	13th	12th	14th	-	10
Bermuda	-	-	-	-	19th	-	=10th	-	23rd	-	22nd	-	-	-	-	-	-	4
Botswana	-	-	-	-	-	-	-	-	-	-	-	10th	13th	-	-	-	-	2
Canada	-	-	-	-	11th	12th	=10th	6th	13th	13th	21st	-	-	-	-	-	-	7
Cayman Islands	-	-	-	-	-	-	-	16th	21st	23rd	24th	-	-	-	-	-	-	4
Cook Islands	-	-	-	-	-	-	=6th	5th	7th	7th	11th	7th	-	-	-	-	-	6
England	3rd	4th	3rd	2nd	4th	4th	4th	4th	4th	3rd	4th	4th	3rd	3rd	3rd	2nd	Q	17
Fiji	-	-	-	8th	-	-	8th	11th	-	6th	8th	9th	10th	11th	14th	11th	-	10
Grenada	-	-	-	-	15th	-	-	-	-	-	20th	-	-	-	-	-	-	2
Hong Kong	-	-	-	-	-	13th	-	17th	23rd	24th	23rd	-	-	-	-	-	Q	6
Republic of Ireland	-	-	-	-	10th	-	15th	10th	25th	-	-	-	-	-	-	-	-	4
Jamaica	5th	6th	=4th	5th	5th	5th	5th	3rd	5th	4th	3rd	3rd	4th	4th	5th	3rd	Q	17
Malawi	-	-	-	-	-	-	-	-	8th	11th	-	5th	6th	6th	6th	7th	Q	8
Malaysia	-	-	-	-	-	12th	17th	19th	26th	19th	-	16th	16th	-	-	-	-	7
Malta	-	-	-	-	-	-	-	-	27th	-	-	-	-	-	-	-	-	1
Namibia	-	-	-	-	-	-	-	13th	16th	-	-	-	-	-	-	-	Q	3
New Zealand	2nd	1st	2nd	3rd	=1st	2nd	1st	2nd	3rd	2nd	1st	2nd	2nd	2nd	1st	4th	Q	17
Niue	-	-	-	-	-	-	-	-	-	25th	12th	-	-	-	-	-	-	2
Northern Ireland	11th	-	8th	9th	17th	7th	=10th	12th	18th	16th	19th	-	8th	-	10th	-	Q	13
Papua New Guinea	-	-	-	11th	-	-	14th	14th	15th	18th	-	-	-	-	-	-	-	5
Saint Kitts and Nevis	-	-	-	-	=6th	-	-	-	-	-	-	-	-	-	-	-	-	1
Saint Lucia	-	-	-	-	=12th	-	-	-	-	-	16th	-	-	-	-	-	-	2
Saint Vincent and the Grenadines	-	-	-	-	16th	-	-	-	10th	-	13th	-	-	-	-	-	Q	4
Samoa	-	-	-	-	-	-	-	8th	9th	9th	6th	8th	12th	10th	13th	-	Q	9
Scotland	8th	7th	6th	6th	9th	6th	9th	9th	22nd	20th	15th	14th	-	12th	11th	10th	Q	16
Singapore	-	8th	-	10th	-	10th	-	18th	20th	12th	-	15th	15th	15th	16th	15th	Q	12
South Africa	6th	3rd	-	-	-	-	-	-	2nd	5th	5th	6th	5th	5th	4th	6th	Q	11
Sri Lanka	9th	-	-	-	-	14th	16th	15th	19th	21st	18th	-	14th	16th	15th	16th	-	11
Tonga	-	-	-	-	-	-	-	-	-	22nd	-	-	-	-	-	8th	Q	3
Trinidad and Tobago	4th	5th	=4th	4th	=1st	3rd	=2nd	-	6th	8th	10th	11th	7th	9th	9th	12th	Q	16
Uganda	-	-	-	-	=12th	-	-	-	-	-	-	-	-	8th	7th	5th	Q	5
United States	-	-	-	-	-	-	-	-	14th	15th	9th	-	-	-	-	-	-	3
Vanuatu	-	-	-	-	-	-	-	20th	-	26th	-	-	-	-	-	-	-	2
Wales	10th	-	7th	7th	=6th	8th	13th	7th	17th	14th	14th	12th	9th	7th	-	9th	-	14
West Indies	7th	-	-	-	-	-	-	-	-	-	-	-	-	-	-	-	-	1
Zambia	-	-	-	-	-	-	-	-	-	17th	-	-	-	14th	-	-	-	2
Zimbabwe	-	-	-	-	-	-	-	-	-	-	-	-	-	-	8th	13th	-	2

== Most individual appearances ==
As of 2 June 2026
Apps	Name	Country	Career
6	Rhonda John-Davis	Trinidad and Tobago	1999–2019
6	Latonia Blackman	Barbados	1999–2023
6	Jade Clarke	England	2003–2023
6	Geva Mentor	England	2003–2023
5	Jean Pierre	Trinidad and Tobago	1963–1979
5	Janet Johnson	Jamaica	1975–1991
5	Elizabeth Rodgers	Northern Ireland	1975–1991
5	Jennifer Franks	Trinidad and Tobago	1979–1995
5	Connie Francis	Jamaica	1987–2003
5	Irene van Dyk	South Africa; New Zealand	1995–2011
5	Leana de Bruin	South Africa; New Zealand	1999–2015
4	Oberon Pitterson	Jamaica	1991–2003
4	Karen Atkinson	England	1999–2011
4	Nadine Bryan	Jamaica	1999–2011
4	Althea Byfield	Jamaica	1999–2011
4	Sonia Mkoloma	England	1999–2011
4	Bongiwe Msomi	South Africa	2011–2023

== Bibliography ==
- Australian Women's Weekly (5 September 1979). "SPOT THE BALL and win a trip to Disneyland". The Australian Women's Weekly. National Library of Australia. p. 78.
- International Federation of Netball Associations (15 June 2008). "History of Netball". Archived from the original on 6 March 2011.
- Netball Singapore (2011). "About Us". Archived from the original on 1 March 2011.
- Netball Singapore (2011b). "Milestones". Archived from the original on 18 February 2011.
- Sri Lanka Netball (30 September 2010). "THE HISTORY OF NETBALL IN SRI LANKA". Archived from the original on 6 March 2011.
- Thompson, Shona M. (December 2002). "Women and sport in New Zealand". In Pfister, Gertrud; Hartmann-Tews, Ilse (eds.). Sport and Women: Social Issues in International Perspective. International Society for Comparative Physical Education & Sport. Routledge. ISBN 0-415-24628-8.
- World Netball Championships 2011 Singapore (2011). "History". Archived from the original on 14 March 2011.
