= Geography of netball =

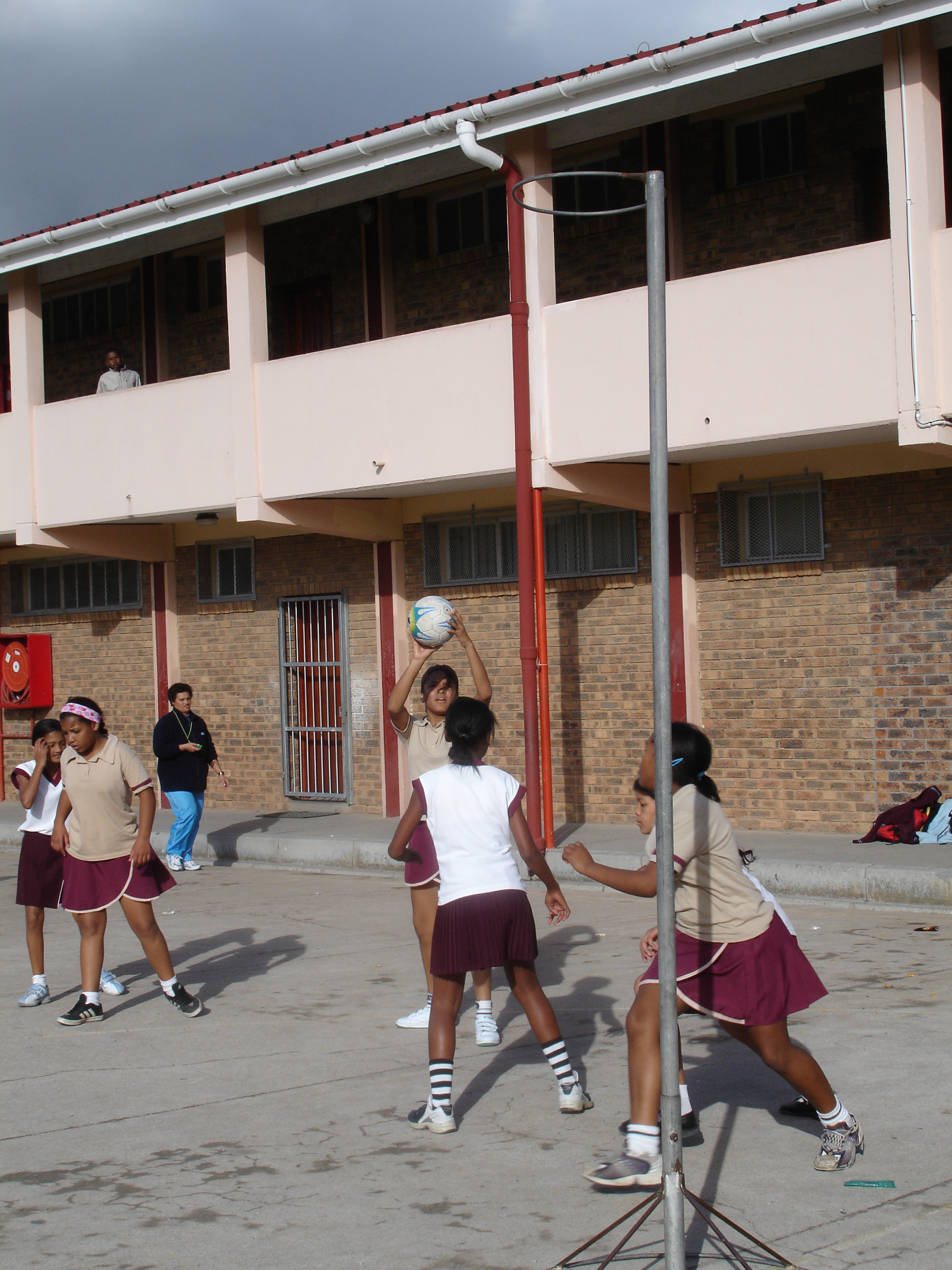
Schoolyard netball game at Reygersdal Primary School, South Africa.

Netball is a popular participant sport in some parts of the world, particularly in countries of the Commonwealth of Nations. According to the IFNA, over 20 million people play netball in more than 72 countries. IFNA member nations are divided into five regional groups: Africa, America, Asia, Europe and Oceania.

== Africa ==
Netball is a popular women's sport in parts of Africa. Several African nations are ranked amongst the top twenty-five in the world. As of August 2015, South Africa was ranked number five, Malawi was ranked number six, Uganda was ranked thirteen, Zambia was ranked seventeen, and Botswana was ranked nineteen in the world.

In South Africa participation rates are high, with 40% of African girls rating netball as their favourite sport in 2002, although many African girls claiming netball as their favourite sport had never played it. South Africa was part of the 1960 meeting of Commonwealth countries in Sri Lanka that standardised the rules for the game. From 1969 to 1994, South Africa was expelled from competing internationally in netball due to its apartheid policies. During the 1995 Netball World Championships South Africa scored an upset win over New Zealand in pool play and finished second behind Australia. In 2000, New Zealand's national side toured South Africa for the first time, playing three test matches. In 2001, a Tri-Nations Series was launched between Australia, New Zealand and South Africa, which was also won by New Zealand.

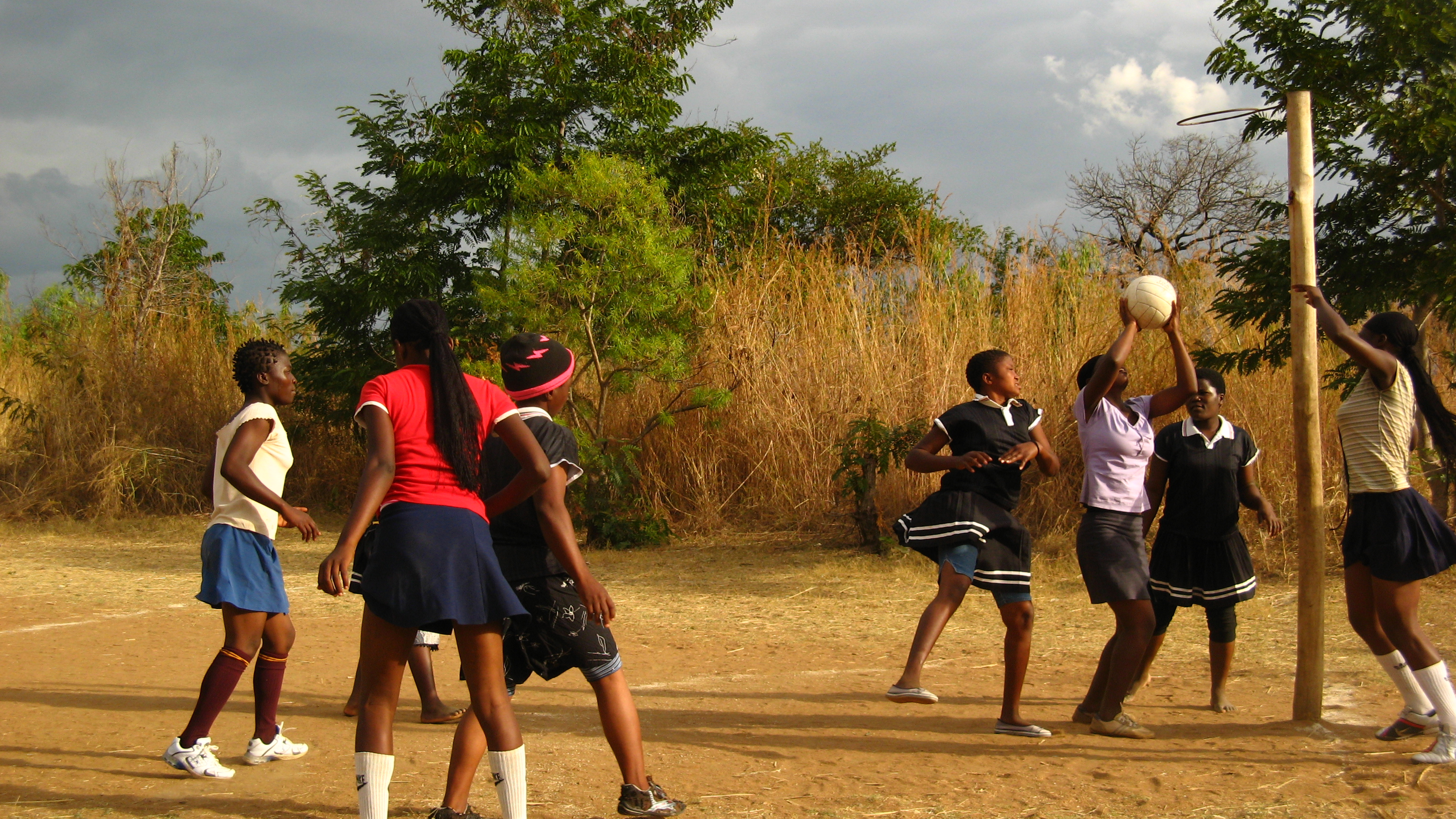
A local netball match in Malawi.

Netball is the most popular women's sport in Botswana, Malawi and Tanzania. In Botswana netball is primarily played by women, with men traditionally serving as officials, coaches and administrators for the sport. There are also a few men-only teams, although many were discontinued in the 2000s in favour of mixed-gender teams. The Botswana Netball Association was founded in the 1970s and is the national organisation responsible for netball in Botswana. Netball was introduced to Tanzania after World War I, when the country was under British colonial rule. All primary schools in the country have a court and children are generally recruited to high level teams at a young age. The Netball Association of Tanzania (CHANETA) was created in 1966 and has been mostly run by women, although men can play a role in coaching. During the 1970s and 1980s, the International Olympic Committee and the British Council promoted netball in Tanzania, but were unwilling to invest money. Economic liberalisation saw the popularity of netball decline during the 1990s, and recent attempts to raise netball's popularity have been slow as a sport is culturally more acceptable for men. The Tanzanian national netball team finished in third place at the 2010 Nations Cup.

== Americas ==
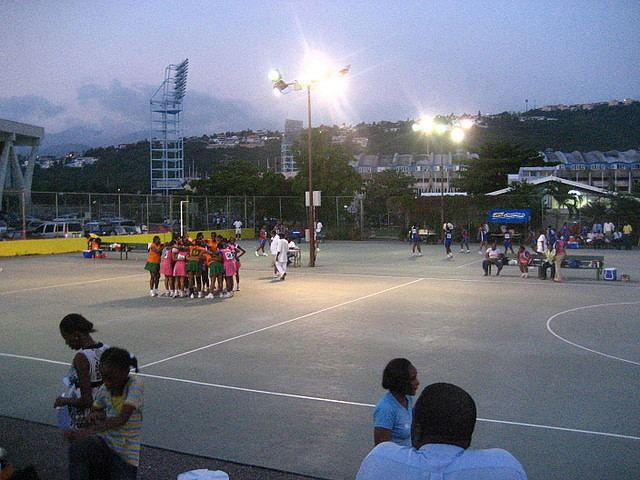
Netball being played in Jamaica.

The IFNA covers 54 nations within the Americas, 13 of which have their own national governing bodies. Each year, the region hosts two tournaments: the CNA U16 Championship and the AFNA Senior Championship. Netball is most popular in Commonwealth countries, such as Antigua and Barbuda and Grenada. As of August 2015, several teams in the region ranked amongst the top 25 in the world, including Jamaica (4th), Trinidad & Tobago (9th) Barbados (11th), Saint Lucia (18th), Canada (21st), and the United States of America (25th).

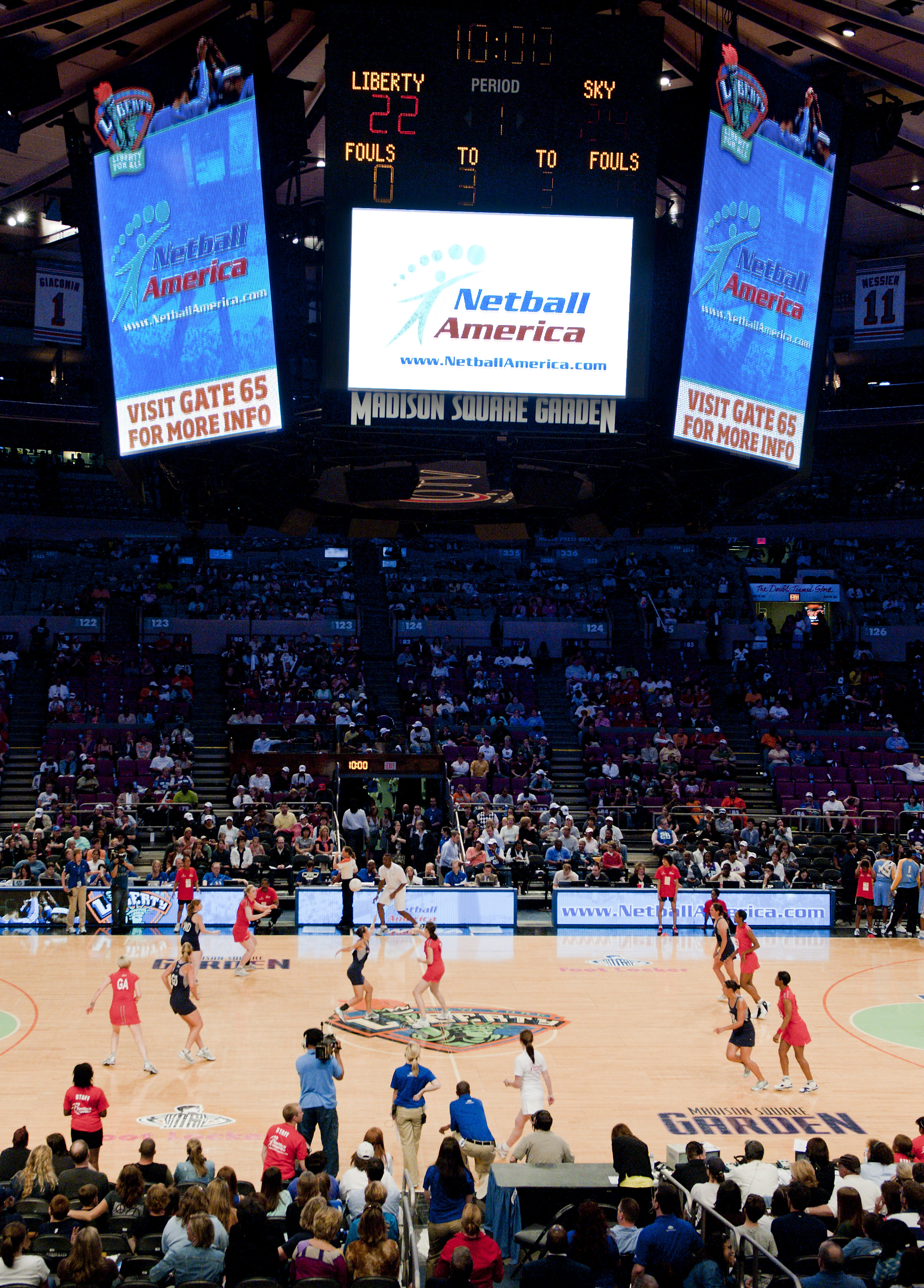
Netball being played in front of 14,000 at Madison Square Garden

Netball has been played in Jamaica since 1909, mostly at schools and teachers' training colleges. Once graduated, players created club sides for casual play, expanding the game throughout the country. During the 1930s, the major national competition was the ISSA Cup with seven teams. One of the teams, Wolmer's Old Girls Association (W.O.G.A.), built the first hard netball court in Jamaica. Pancho Rankine, Margaret Beckford and Margarietta St. Juste created the Jamaica Netball Association in 1959 and the organisation became affiliated to the West Indies Netball Board. They formed a national team to compete in the West Indies Tournament that was held in Montserrat in August 1959. In 1960, a member of the All England Netball Association went to Jamaica to coach, lecture and test umpires. Two years later, an English team toured the West Indies, beating Jamaica, Trinidad and the West Indies. In 1967, a team representing Greater London toured Jamaica, winning all their matches on the tour. In 1970, a team of British Students toured the Bahamas and Jamaica. Later that year, Jamaica's national team toured England. The third World Tournament was held in Kingston, Jamaica in 1971. Jamaica's national association protested against South Africa's apartheid policies, banning players who participated in the 1973 English tour of South Africa.

Netball's popularity in the United States increased during the 1970s, particularly in the New York area. In 1992 the first national championship was held and in 1995 the USA's first international game was played against England at the Netball World Championship in Birmingham. In 2003, the country was ranked 9th in the world, however in 2015 the country is ranked 25th in the world. Canada has both men's and women's national teams.

In 2007, Netball America, now the largest Netball Association in the US, was founded by Steve Anderson, Moreen Logsdon, Jo O'Key, and Sonya Ottaway. Netball America is sanctioned by the United States International University Sports Federation to host the 2nd World University Netball Championship in Miami 2016. Netball America also sent the first team of American Citizens to the inaugural World University Netball Championship in South Africa in 2012. The Netball America University Team is currently ranked 8th in the World. Twelve nations will be competing at the 2016 FISU World University Netball Championship in Miami, Florida. Netball America is the leader in bringing Netball to the US and has seen the introduction of Netball into US educational systems (New York City, Florida, New Hampshire, Tampa and Miami) and also has introduced Netball across 33 US States. In addition to being the host for the World University Netball Championship, Netball America is also the host of the Disney International Youth Tournament and the World Out Games that will have 17,000 athletes descend upon Miami in May 2017, and Netball America petitioned to get Netball included as a new sport to the games that support the LGBT community

== Asia ==
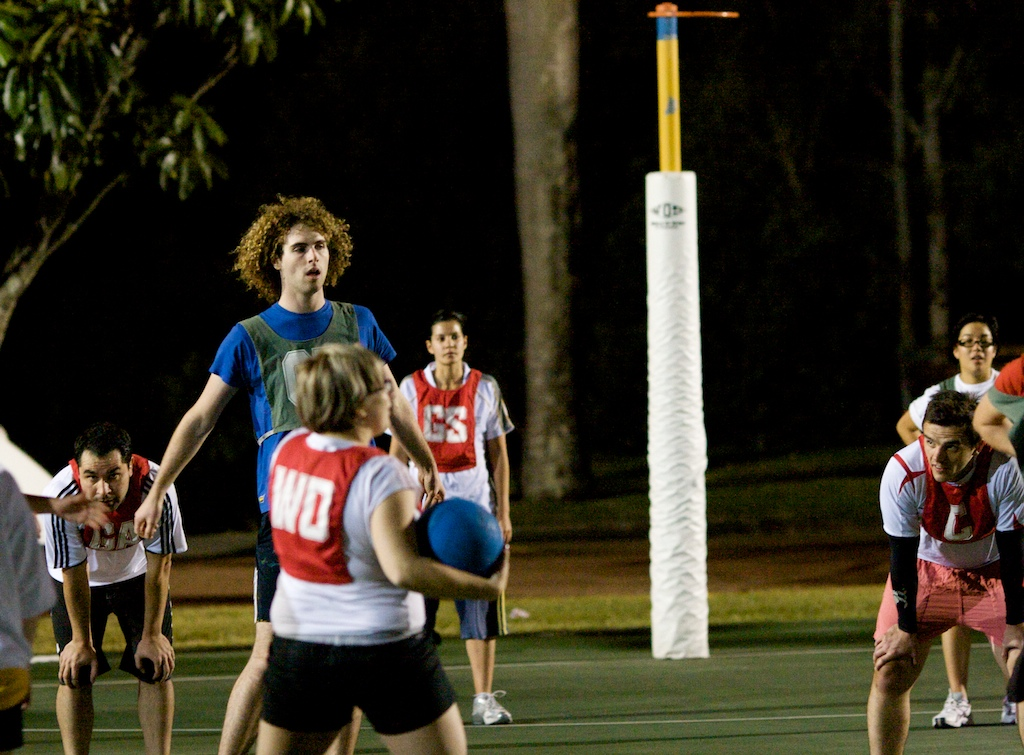
Local mixed netball game in Brisbane, Queensland.

Netball is popular in several parts of Asia. The IFNA Asia region includes countries such as Australia (geopolitically considered part of Oceania), India, Malaysia, Singapore and Sri Lanka. The major regional competition is the Asian Netball Championship. In 1994, the first Asian Youth Championship was held in Hong Kong.

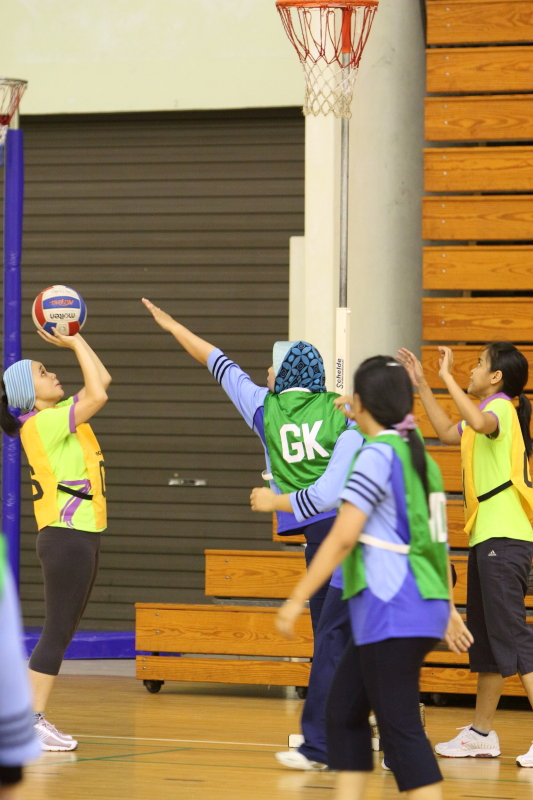
BKP Netball Tournament at the SHHB Sports Complex in Berakas, Brunei (May 2009).

Netball has the highest participation rate of any team sport—male or female—in Australia, but it is not a large spectator following. In 2005 and 2006, netball was the 10th most popular spectator sport for women after tennis. Netball was brought to Australia by English school teachers, with a team having been organised by 1904 at Parramatta Superior Schools. In 1927, a national federation for the sport, Australian Women's Basketball Association, was created. Australia's national team toured England in 1957, which resulted in a number of Commonwealth countries organising a meeting to try to standardise the rules of the game.

In Australia 80% of netball is played at netball clubs, although the number of netball clubs around Australia has been in decline since the 1940s. Currently there are around 350,000 registered players and over 1.2 million total players in the country. Prior to the establishment of the ANZ Championship, the National Netball League was the major competition in Australia. It included teams from the Australian Capital Territory, New South Wales, Queensland, Victoria, South Australia and Western Australia. The Australian national netball team won the first world championships in 1963 in England, and nine of the twelve Netball World Championships to date. As of August 2015, the national team is ranked first on the INF World Rankings. The country set an attendance record for a netball match with a crowd of 14,339 at the Australia – New Zealand Netball Test held at the Sydney SuperDome game in 2004.

Women started playing netball in India as early as 1926. The Sports Authority of India and the Government of India has provided funded for the country's youth national team. In 2001 India's national team competed in the fifth Asian Netball Championship in Colombo, Sri Lanka. Important netball competitions held in India include the 2010 Commonwealth Games, and the 7th Asian Youth Netball Championship. The Indian national netball team's best results have been placing sixth at the 2010 Nations Cup and fourth at the 2010 Asian Youth Netball Championship.

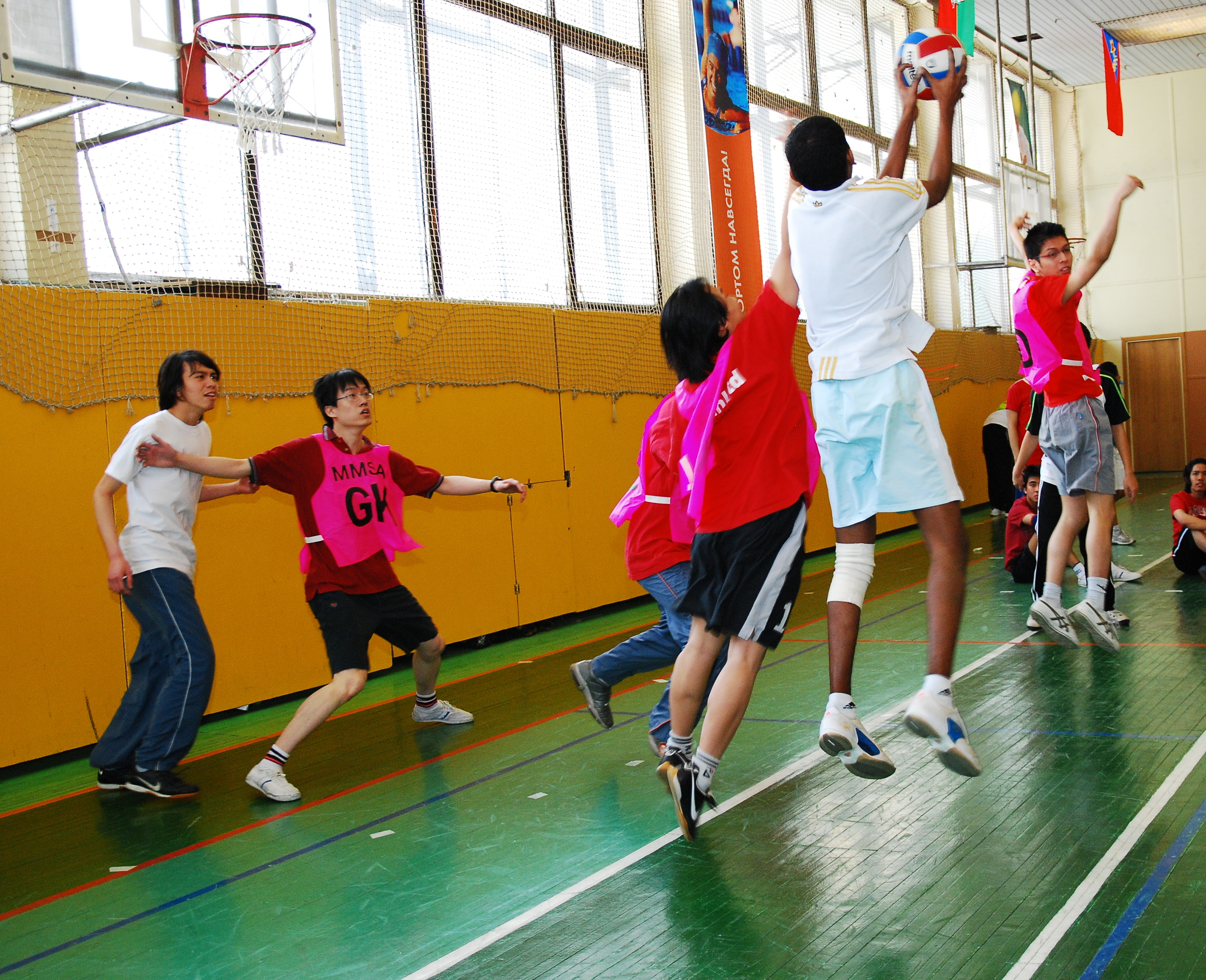
Men's Interbatch Games 2009 RMSA in Malaysia.

Netball is the most popular women's sport in Malaysia. The national organisation, the Malaysian Netball Association, was created in 1978 and the sport is part of the national curriculum beginning at year 3. In 1998, 113 districts held netball competitions, and there were 1,718 registered netball teams in the country. In 2001, netball was sufficiently popular in South East Asia for it to be included in the 21st Southeast Asian Games in Kuala Lumpur. Malaysia had a national team compete in the fifth Asian Netball Championship in Colombo in 2001. As of August 2015, the women's national team was ranked number twenty-two in the world.

Netball Singapore is the official governing body for the sport in Singapore. It was created in 1962, with 63 registered clubs and now governs 80,000 netball players. The national team competed in its first major tournament in 1967 at the Netball World Championships and sent a team to the fifth Asian Netball Championship in Colombo. As of August 2015, the women's national team was ranked number fifteen in the world.

Netball was first played in Sri Lanka by Ceylon Girl Guide Company at Kandy High School in 1921. In 1927, netball was played at a Government Training College for the first time, helping to spread the game around Sri Lanka. By 1952, Sri Lankan clubs were playing Indian club sides. In 1956, Sri Lanka played its first international match against Australia's national team in Sri Lanka. The 1960 netball meeting of Commonwealth countries to try to standardise the rules for the game took place in Sri Lanka. The Netball Federation of Sri Lanka was created in 1972, before being dissolved by the government in 1983. Sri Lanka had a national team compete in the fifth Asian Netball Championship held in Colombo. As of August 2015, the women's national team was ranked number twenty-four in the world.

== Europe ==
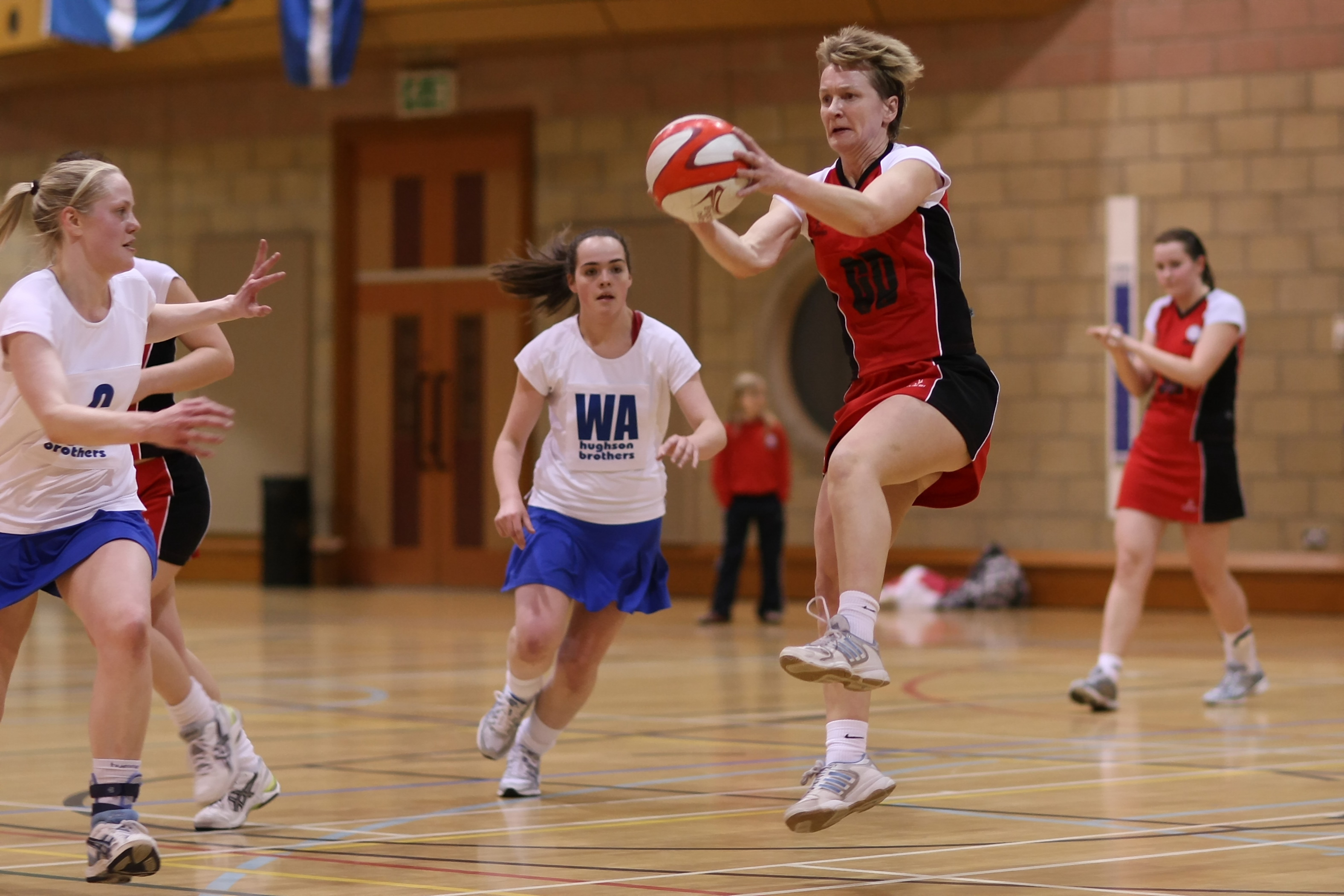
Orkney A (red) v Shetland A (white/blue): intercounty netball (March 2009) in Scotland.

Netball is primarily played in Commonwealth countries, which were heavily involved in standardising the rules for netball. The Federation of European Netball Associations (FENA), sometimes referred to as Netball Europe, is the governing body for netball in the Europe netball region. The organisation was created in 1989/1990. As of August 2015, the English women's national team was ranked number three in the world, Wales is ranked number eight, Scotland is ranked number ten, and Northern Ireland is ranked number twelve. The major netball competition in Europe is the Netball Superleague and features nine to ten teams from all areas of Britain.

In the United Kingdom, netball has traditionally been managed by women. In England, netball is included as part of the physical education curriculum. Its inclusion had been at times controversial; during the 1910s and 1920s, schools worried about the potential negative impact of physical exercise on the health of girls. The Welsh Netball Association (Cymdeithas Pêl Rwyd Cymru) was created in 1945. The WNA is responsible for national championships, Welsh squad selection, international matches, the training and development of players, coaches, and umpires and for the Sport Wales National Centre Netball Academy, Cardiff. The Welsh Netball Association is based in Pontcanna, Cardiff. Like other national associations, the Welsh have created a modified version of the game for children called "Dragon Netball". The rate of comparative participation for netball to other sports differs from key-stage to key-stage (year levels in school) in Northern Ireland. In Northern Ireland, about 1,300 women play competitive netball in club-based leagues.

== Oceania ==
In Australia and New Zealand, netball is the most popular sport played by women. Women's sport in Oceania has traditionally had a very low profile. Despite this, netball is popular in Oceania, with its growth partly because of New Zealand encouraging the game and providing money for the training of coaches, umpires and other netball development needs. Netball is one of the sports at the Pacific Games, a multi-sport event, with participation from countries around the South Pacific, that is held every four years. The popularity of netball is growing amongst men on the island countries in Oceania, because sport is an important way for villages to keep in touch with each other. The game's popularity can also be seen in local languages, where local words have been created to describe it. The Oceania Netball Federation (ONF) is the governing body for netball in the Oceania region.

In New Zealand, netball is the most popular women's participation sport. In 1984, there were 114,210 players and currently there are over 11,000 teams and 120,440 players. The only sport with more players is golf, which has 128,860 male and female players. Ninety-eight percent of New Zealand netball players are female. The sports with the next highest rates of female participation are field hockey and horse racing, both at sixty-four percent. Netball is extremely popular amongst Māori women. New Zealand took part in the 1960 netball meeting of Commonwealth countries to try to standardise the rules for the game. New Zealand has a history of netball being a spectator sport with the games being televised on Television New Zealand. The 1999 Netball World Championships final between Australia and New Zealand was the highest rated program ever on New Zealand television. New Zealand also has a men's national team that has competed in the 2009 and 2011 International Challenge Men's and Mixed Netball Tournament. As of August 2015, the women's national team was ranked number two in the world.

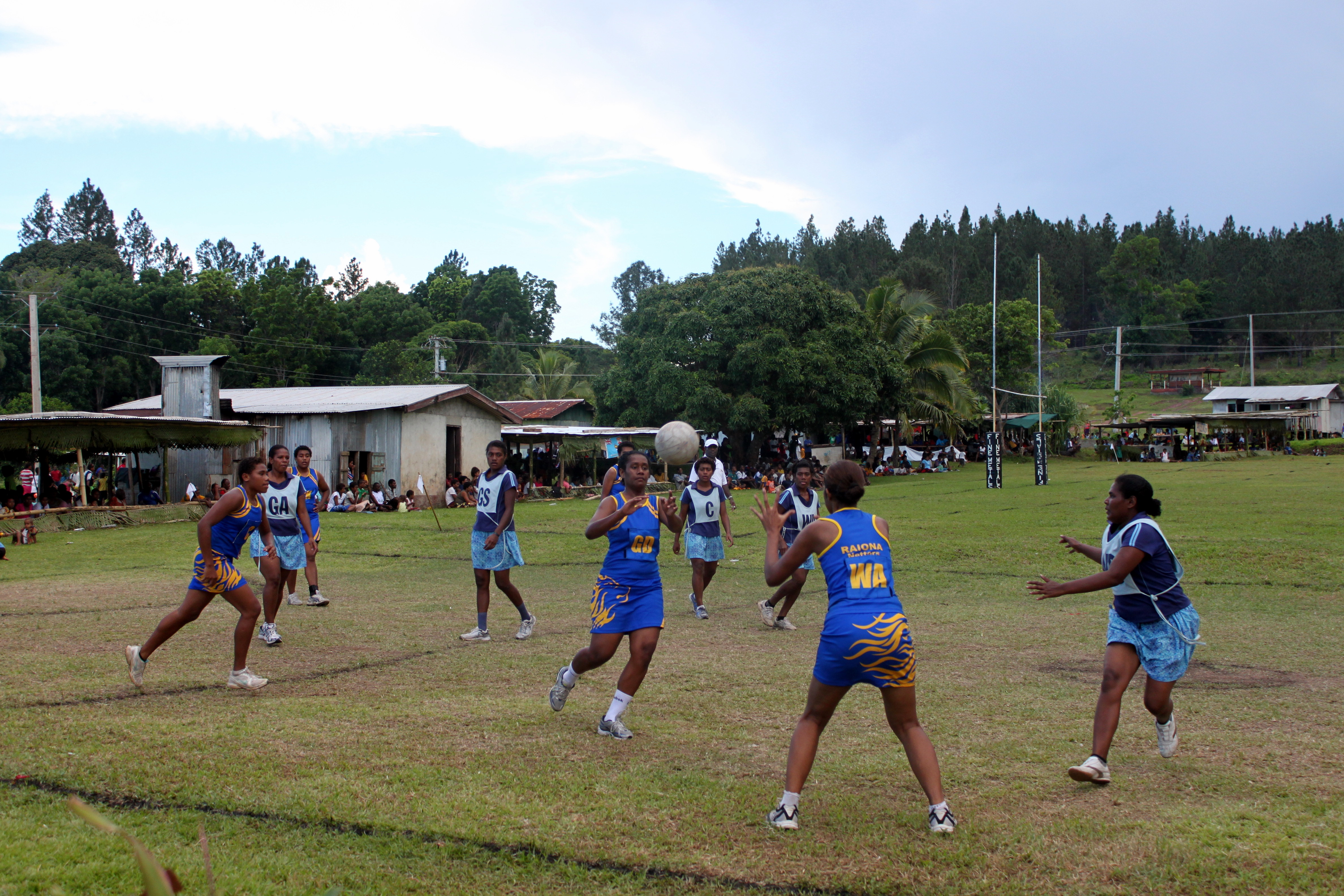
A netball competition at Natalei, Fiji.

The Cook Islands are a major netball playing country in Oceania, with over 1,000 registered members. The game became popular during the 1970s, and is an important sport in the region. The country has participated at several international events including the Pacific Games, the Commonwealth Games, the Netball World Championships, the World Games, the Oceania Netball Tournament, the World Youth Netball Championship, and the International Challenge Men's and Mixed Netball Tournament. Netball has a lot of grass roots support and is an important part of life for many women on the islands. The sport's popularity is partly due to the influence of New Zealand, where Cook Island players have competed for New Zealand's national team. New Zealand worked hard to develop the sport in the country during the 1980s, when they hosted a number of coaching and umpiring clinics. The Cook Islands won the netball competition at the first South Pacific Games (now Pacific Games), held in 1981. In the 1990 Oceania Netball Tournament, the team beat New Zealand, Tonga and Fiji to come in second, behind Australia. As of August 2015, the women's national team was ranked number twenty-three in the world.

Women's participation in netball in Fiji is comparable to men's participation in rugby.

The sport started to grow in popularity during the 1970s. Fiji was supposed to host the 2007 World Netball Championship, but due to a military coup the IFNA decided to move the championship to Auckland. Netball has a large amount of grassroots support in Samoa. The sport started to grow in popularity during the 1970s. Games in Fiji and Samoa are most often played by girls on Saturdays during the winter, though games can be played at all times of the year. Samoa and Fiji are traditional netball rivals, competing against each other at events like the Pacific Games. As of August 2015, Samoa's national team was ranked number fourteen in the world and Fiji's was ranked number seven.

== Bibliography ==
- Alexeyeff, Kalissa (2009). Dancing from the heart : movement, gender, and Cook Islands globalization. University of Hawaii Press. ISBN 978-0-8248-3244-5. OCLC 0824832442.
- All England Netball Association (1976). Golden jubilee : 1926–1976. All England Netball Association. OCLC 39500756.
- Atherly, Kim M. (30 October 2006). "Sport, Localism and Social Capital in Rural Western Australia". Geographical Research. Vol. 44. pp. 348–360. doi:10.1111/j.1745-5871.2006.00406.x.
- Australian Bureau of Statistics (2006). "4177.0 – Participation in Sports and Physical Recreation, Australia 2005–06".
- Australian Bureau of Statistics (27 January 2007). "FREQUENCY OF ATTENDANCE AT MAIN SPORTS".
- Australian Women's Weekly (5 September 1979). "SPOT THE BALL and win a trip to Disneyland". The Australian Women's Weekly. National Library of Australia. p. 78.
- BNSC (11 May 2011). "Botswana Netball Association". BNSC. Archived from the original on 6 July 2011.
- Booth, Douglas (1998). The Race Game: Sport and Politics in South Africa. Sport in the Global Society. Routledge. ISBN 0-7146-4799-3. OCLC 361505975.
- Brawley, Sean (January 1997). "CHAPTER 9: The Pacific Islander Community". Sporting Immigrants: Sport & Ethnicity in Australia. EBSCOhost: 116–125.
- Britton, Hannah Evelyn; Fish, Jennifer Natalie; Meintjes, Sheila (2009). Women's activism in South Africa : working across divides. University of KwaZulu-Natal Press. ISBN 978-1-86914-146-2. OCLC 271135550.
- Cook Islands Netball Association (2009). "About Us". Archived from the original on 14 March 2011.
- Crocombe, R. G. (1990). Voluntary service and development in the Cook Islands. Cook Islands Extension Centre : Institute of Pacific Studies of the University of the South Pacific. ISBN 982-02-0023-7. OCLC 28814053.
- DaCosta, Lamartine P.; Miragaya, Ana (2002). Worldwide experiences and trends in sport for all. Meyer & Meyer Sport. ISBN 1-84126-085-1. OCLC 248362122.
- Davis, Luke; Davis, Damien (2006). Netball. Getting into. Macmillan Education. ISBN 0-7329-9987-1. OCLC 156762948.
- Department of Foreign Affairs and Trade (2008). "About Australia: Sporting Events".
- Department of Foreign Affairs and Trade (2008a). "Australia in Brief: A sporting life".
- England Netball (2010). "Netball Europe". Archived from the original on 19 July 2011.
- Epstein, Irving (2007). The Greenwood encyclopedia of children's issues worldwide. Greenwood Press. ISBN 978-0-313-33614-0. OCLC 226115683.
- FIAT Netball Superleague. "History".
- Government of Sri Lanka (21 July 2001). "5th Asian Netball Championship next week in Colombo". Archived from the original on 26 January 2004.
- International Federation of Netball Associations (15 June 2008). "History of Netball". Archived from the original on 6 March 2011.
- International Federation of Netball Associations (2010f). "Regional Federations – Americas". Archived from the original on 26 July 2011.
- International Federation of Netball Associations (2011). "IFNA: Wales". Archived from the original on 18 March 2011.
- International Federation of Netball Associations (21 January 2011a). "Current World Rankings". Archived from the original on 19 May 2011.
- International Federation of Netball Associations (2011c). "Regional Federations – Asia". Archived from the original on 26 July 2011.
- International Federation of Netball Associations (2011e). "Regional Federations – Oceania". Archived from the original on 26 July 2011.
- Keim, Marion (2003). Nation building at play : sport as a tool for social integration in post-apartheid South Africa. Meyer and Meyer Sport. ISBN 1-84126-099-1. OCLC 249142681.
- Lal, Brij Vilash; Fortune, Kate (2000). The Pacific islands : an encyclopedia. University of Hawai'i press. ISBN 0-8248-2265-X. OCLC 468583962.
- Lanka Journal (29 June 2009). "Sri Lanka clinch Asian Netball Title". Archived from the original on 6 March 2011.
- Lanka Truth (29 June 2009). "Sri Lanka wins Asian Netball Championship".
- McKinnon, Rowan (2009). South Pacific [the only guide to the entire South Pacific]. Lonely Planet. ISBN 978-1-74104-786-8. OCLC 610105853.
- Mahoney, Craid (July 1997). "Age and sport participation". In Kremer, John; Ogle, Saun; Trew, Karen (eds.). Young people's involvement in sport. Routledge. ISBN 978-0-415-16650-8. OCLC 36225511.
- Massoa, Prisca; Fasting, Kari (December 2002). "Women and sport in Tanzania". In Pfister, Gertrud; Hartmann-Tews, Ilse (eds.). Sport and Women: Social Issues in International Perspective. International Society for Comparative Physical Education & Sport. Routledge. ISBN 0-415-24628-8. OCLC 50204306.
- Netball Asia (2011). "Malaysia". Netball Asia. Archived from the original on 1 May 2011.
- Netball New Zealand (3 August 2009). "History".
- Netball Singapore (2010a). "NTUC FairPrice Foundation Nations Cup 2010". Archived from the original on 6 March 2011.
- Netball Singapore (2011). "About Us".
- Netball Singapore (2011b). "Milestones". Archived from the original on 18 February 2011.
- Ng, Jean (2010). "Singapore Netball Hero Jean NG".
- Alison Megarrity (21 September 2004). "Inclusion of Netball in the Olympic Games". Parliamentary Debates (Hansard). Parliament of New South Wales: Legislative Assembly. col. 11179–11179. Archived from the original on 29 August 2011. Archived 29 August 2011 at the Wayback Machine
- Phillips, Jock (8 February 2011). "'Sports and leisure – Organised sports', Te Ara – the Encyclopedia of New Zealand".
- Sagar, Naresh (4 July 2010). "Asian Youth Netball Championship". Sagar Media. Archived from the original on 15 July 2011.
- Samoa Observer (18 December 2008). "Samoa prepares for World netball series". Samoa Observer. Archived from the original on 7 June 2011.
- Samoa Observer (28 February 2011). "A journey of a thousand miles begins for Samoa national men's netball team". Samoa Observer. Archived from the original on 11 November 2018.
- Shakespear, Wilma; Caldow, Margaret (2009). Netball : steps to success. Champaign, Illinois: Human Kinetics. ISBN 978-0-7360-7984-6. OCLC 251227987.
- Sperlich, Wolfgang B (1997). Tohi vagahau Niue : Niuean-English, with English-Niuean finderlist = Niue language dictionary. Government of Niue. ISBN 0-8248-1933-0. OCLC 231713590.
- Starnes, Dean; Luckham, Nana (2009). Lonely Planet Fiji. Lonely Planet. ISBN 978-1-74104-793-6. OCLC 312626596.
- Tagg, Brendon (December 2008). "'Imagine, a Man Playing Netball!' : Masculinities and Sport in New Zealand". International Review for the Sociology of Sport. 43: 409–430. doi:10.1177/1012690208099875. S2CID 145493659.
- Taylor, Tracy (1998). "Issues of cultural diversity in women's sport". Women in Sport (PDF). Vol. 29. Archived from the original (PDF) on 13 January 2012.
- Thompson, Shona M. (December 2002). "Women and sport in New Zealand". In Pfister, Gertrud; Hartmann-Tews, Ilse (eds.). Sport and Women: Social Issues in International Perspective. International Society for Comparative Physical Education & Sport. New York: Routledge. ISBN 0-415-24628-8. OCLC 50204306.
- Turk, Peter. "History of Men's Netball". International Mens and Mixed Netball Challenge Cup.
- United Nations Centre Against Apartheid (1976). Notes and documents – Centre Against Apartheid, Issues 1–37. United Nations Centre Against Apartheid. OCLC 6842063.
- United States of America Netball Association (USANA), Inc. (10 October 2010). "About Us". United States of America Netball Association. Archived from the original on 26 December 2010.
- United States of America Netball Association (USANA), Inc. (27 January 2010a). "Membership". United States of America Netball Association.
- United States of America Netball Association (USANA), Inc. (2010b). "History of the USANA". United States of America Netball Association. Archived from the original on 16 March 2011.
- Van Bottenburg, Maarten (2001). Global games. Urbana, Illinois: University of Illinois Press. ISBN 0-252-02654-3. OCLC 45413476.
- Welsh Netball Association (2009). "Welsh Netball Association – History". Welsh Netball Association website. Welsh Netball Association. Archived from the original on 9 March 2011.
- Western Argus (24 October 1922). "GAMES FOR GIRLS". Western Argus (Kalgoorlie, WA : 1916–1938). Kalgoorlie, WA: National Library of Australia. p. 1.
- White, Anita (December 2002). "Women and sport in the UK". In Pfister, Gertrud; Hartmann-Tews, Ilse (eds.). Sport and Women: Social Issues in International Perspective. International Society for Comparative Physical Education & Sport. New York: Routledge. ISBN 0-415-24628-8. OCLC 50204306.
