= Netball in the United States =

- Country: United States
- Governing body: USA Netball; Netball America
- National team: United States
- First played: 1890s

Netball in the United States dates back to the 1890s. Modern netball evolved from early forms of women's basketball played in the United States. However, despite its early origins, it never took off in the United States. During the 1970s, it was re-introduced to the United States, mainly by Australian, New Zealand, Jamaican and other Caribbean diasporas. Since 2007, netball in the United States has been organised by two rival governing bodies, USA Netball and Netball America. The United States national netball team has competed in international netball competitions such as the World Netball Championships, AFNA Championships and Netball World Cup Qualifiers.

== History ==
=== Early years ===
Modern netball evolved from early forms of women's basketball played in the United States. In January 1892, James Naismith published his original rules of basketball. During the later 1890s, two American teachers, Senda Berenson Abbott, a gymnastics teacher at Smith College in Northampton, Massachusetts, and Clara Gregory Baer, a physical education teacher at the H. Sophie Newcomb Memorial College in New Orleans, independently adapted Naismith's rules to make them more suitable for women. By 1895, American visitors and teachers, had helped introduce "women's basketball" to England, where another physical education pioneer, Martina Bergman Österberg and her students amended the rules further and the sport eventually evolved into netball. From England, netball eventually travelled around the Commonwealth of Nations and became a popular women's sport. However, despite its early origins, it never took off in the United States.

=== Reintroduction ===
Netball was re-introduced to the United States in the 1970s, starting primarily in the New York City area. It was mainly played by the Australian, New Zealand, Jamaican and other Caribbean diasporas.

== Governing bodies ==
Since 2007, there have been two rival governing bodies for netball in the United States, USA Netball and Netball America. The two rivals organise separate competitions and national teams.

=== USA Netball ===
USA Netball is the official governing body for netball in the United States. It was founded in 1992 as the United States of America Netball Association. It is affiliated to World Netball and Americas Netball. It is responsible for organising and administering the United States national netball team.

=== Netball America ===
In 2006 and 2007, USA Netball experienced an exodus of administrators due to allegations and reports of corruption and unethical behaviour. These issues were reported to World Netball. However, according to an Australian Broadcasting Corporation report, they were never acted upon. The majority of USA Netball's affiliated members, clubs and associations subsequently left the organisation and formed a new governing body, Netball America.

== National teams ==
=== Flying Eagles ===
The United States national netball team, also known as the Flying Eagles, represents USA Netball in international netball competitions. They featured at the 1995, 1999 and 2003 World Netball Championships. Since then, the United States have competed in AFNA Championships and Netball World Cup Qualifiers.

Debut	Tournament	Best result
1995	World Netball Championships	9th (2003)
2012	AFNA Championships	3rd (2014)
2007	Netball World Cup Qualifiers	3rd (2010, 2015)
2016	Netball Europe Open Challenge	3rd (2013)

=== The American Netball Team ===
Netball America also organises a national netball team, which they have branded The American Netball Team and nicknamed The Stars. This team evolved from the Netball America teams that represented the United States at the 2012, 2016 and 2018 World University Netball Championships. Netball America sent the first team of American citizens to the 2012 tournament. They hosted the 2016 tournament at St. Thomas University in Miami, Florida. More recently they have entered teams, including mixed and men's teams in the Dubai Sevens netball tournament. Their 2025 women's team was coached by Jill McIntosh.

Tournaments	Place
2012 World University Netball Championship	8th
2016 World University Netball Championship	8th
2018 World University Netball Championship	6th

== International tournaments ==
The United States has hosted the following international tournaments.

Tournament	Venue
2005 World Youth Netball Championships	Fort Lauderdale
2016 World University Netball Championship	St. Thomas University
