= Yasmin Parsons =

English netball player (born 1993)

Personal information
- Born: 13 July 1993 (age 32)
- Height: 1.70 m (5 ft 7 in)
- University: University of Bath

Netball career
- Playing positions: C, WA
Years	Club team	Apps
2011–2015	Team Bath	
2016–present	Surrey Storm	
Years	National team	Caps
- England
2012	Great Britain	
Medal record
Representing England
Fast5 Netball World Series
Silver medal – second place	2012 Auckland	Team
Representing Great Britain
World University Netball Championship
Gold medal – first place	2012 Cape Town	Team

Yasmin Parsons (born 13 July 1993) is an English netball player who plays for England and for the Surrey Storm in the positions of centre or wing attack. She was appointed as the captain of the national team for the 2019 Netball Europe Open Championships when England were crowned as the winners.

== Career ==
Yasmin has played for few English club teams including the Team Bath from 2011 to 2015 and was a member of the Team Bath which emerged champions during the 2013 Netball Superleague season. She made her Surrey Storm debut in 2016 and also won a Netball Superleague title on her first Superleague season with the team in 2016.
