= World University Netball Championship =

International netball competition for university teams

World University Championship
- Most recent season or competition: 2018 World University Netball Championship
- Sport: Netball
- First season: 2012
- Folded: 2020
- Organising body: International Netball Federation; Fédération Internationale du Sport Universitaire
- Last champion: Uganda
- Most titles: Great Britain; South Africa; Uganda (1 title each)
- Website: World University Netball

The World University Championships were a series of netball tournaments, played between 2012 and 2018, and organized by the International Netball Federation and the Fédération Internationale du Sport Universitaire. Great Britain won the inaugural 2012 tournament. South Africa were the tournaments most successful team, finishing as runners up in both 2012 and 2018 and winning the 2016 tournament. Uganda won the 2018 tournament. Ahead of the 2020 championships, FISU pulled netball from its program, writing to the International Netball Federation – in a letter that was obtained by the Australian Broadcasting Corporation – to tell them that the sport was too Commonwealth-focused and that they had failed to ensure its top-ranked nations were regularly participating at the event. Australia, England and Jamaica were notable absentees from the 2018 tournament.

== History ==
The inaugural 2012 tournament was won by Great Britain who defeated the host nation, South Africa 53–49 in the final. Jamaica finished third after defeating Northern Ireland 41–30 in the bronze medal match.

The 2016 tournament was won by South Africa who defeated Jamaica 43–39 in the gold medal match. Australia finished third after they defeated Uganda 42–41 in the bronze medal match.

The 2018 tournament was won by Uganda who defeated South Africa 44–43 in the gold medal match. Singapore won the bronze after they defeated Zimbabwe 45–40 in their final match.

=== Medallists ===
| Games | Gold | Silver | Bronze |
|---|---|---|---|
| 2012 | Great Britain | South Africa | Jamaica |
| 2016 | South Africa | Jamaica | Australia |
| 2018 | Uganda | South Africa | Singapore |

=== Bronze medal matches ===
| Tournament | Winners | Score | Runners Up | Venue |
|---|---|---|---|---|
| 2012 | Jamaica | 41–30 | Northern Ireland | Good Hope Centre |
| 2016 | Australia | 42–41 | Uganda | St. Thomas University |

=== Gold medal matches ===
| Tournament | Winners | Score | Runners Up | Venue |
|---|---|---|---|---|
| 2012 | Great Britain | 53–49 | South Africa | Good Hope Centre |
| 2016 | South Africa | 43–39 | Jamaica | St. Thomas University |
| 2018 | Uganda | 44–43 | South Africa | Makerere University |

== Participants ==
| Team | (South Africa) 2012 | (United States) 2016 | (Uganda) 2018 |
|---|---|---|---|
| Australia ^{1} | - | 3rd | - |
| England ^{2} | - | 7th | - |
| Great Britain | 1st | - | - |
| Jamaica | 3rd | 2nd | - |
| Kenya | - | - | 4th |
| Namibia | 6th | 5th | - |
| Northern Ireland | 4th | - | - |
| Singapore | - | - | 3rd |
| South Africa | 2nd | 1st | 2nd |
| Sri Lanka | - | - | 7th |
| Trinidad and Tobago | - | 6th | - |
| Uganda | 5th | 4th | 1st |
| United States ^{3} | 8th | 8th | 6th |
| Zimbabwe | 7th | - | 5th |

Notes

- ^1 Australia were represented by the Griffith University netball team.
- ^2 England were represented by the University of Worcester netball team.
- ^3 The United States were represented by Netball America teams.
