= Great Britain national netball team =

National netball team

Great Britain
- Association: British Universities and Colleges Sport
Team colours

The Great Britain national netball team has occasionally represented Great Britain in international netball tournaments. Traditionally England, Scotland, Wales and Northern Ireland have competed as separate teams. However, British Universities and Colleges Sport did enter a Great Britain team in the 2012 World University Netball Championship.

== Tournament history ==
Tournaments	Place
2010 Netball Europe Festival	1st
2012 World University Netball Championship	1st place, gold medalist(s)

== Notable players ==
=== 2012 squad ===
The 2012 World University Netball Championship squad

Great Britain roster
Players
Coaches

Name	Pos	DOB	Height	Club	Nat	Caps
Stephanie Burt	GA, GS		–	University of East Anglia
Sophia Candappa	WA, C	18 August 1992 (aged 19)	–	Loughborough Lightning
Beth Cobden	WD, C	3 February 1993 (aged 19)	1.78 m (5 ft 10 in)	University of Manchester
Kadeen Corbin	GS, GA	27 November 1991 (aged 20)	1.77 m (5 ft 10 in)	Team Bath
Jade Forbes-Wattley			–	Loughborough Lightning
Jodie Gibson	GD, WD, GK	30 October 1992 (aged 19)	1.78 m (5 ft 10 in)	Loughborough Lightning
Natalie Haythornthwaite (c)	WA, GA	9 December 1992 (aged 19)	1.74 m (5 ft 9 in)	Leeds Metropolitan University
Rachel Mulloy			–	Loughborough Lightning
Yasmin Parsons	C, WA	13 July 1993 (aged 18)	1.70 m (5 ft 7 in)	Team Bath
Mia Ritchie (vc)	C, WA	7 February 1990 (aged 22)	1.65 m (5 ft 5 in)	Team Bath
Rachel Shaw	GA, WA	29 April 1992 (aged 20)	1.78 m (5 ft 10 in)	Leeds Metropolitan University
Lauren Steadman			–	Loughborough Lightning

Head coach

- Colette Thomson

Assistant coach

- Mary Tough

Manager: Sarah Gandon

Notes

- (c) – Captain
- (cc) – Co-captain
- (vc) – Vice-captain
- – Injury / maternity leave
- (TRP) – Temporary Replacement Player

=== Captains ===
Captains	Years
Natalie Haythornthwaite	2012

=== Former players ===
- Caroline O'Hanlon has played both for and against the Great Britain university team.

== Head coaches ==
Coach	Years
Colette Thomson	2012

== Honours ==
- World University Netball Championship
  - Winners: 2012
- Netball Europe Festival
  - Winners: 2010
