= Rules of netball =

Netball is a ball sport for two teams of a minimum of 5 up to 7 players; its rules are published in print and online by the World Netball. Games are played on a rectangular court divided into thirds, with a raised goal at each short end. The objective of the game is for teams to score goals, by passing a ball and shooting it into the opposite team's goal ring. Players are assigned "positions" that define their role within the team and restrict their movement on court.

During general play, a player with the ball can take no more than one step before passing it, and must pass the ball or shoot for goal within three seconds. Goals can only be scored by the assigned shooting players. Netball games are 60 minutes long, divided into 15-minute quarters, at the end of which the team with more goals scored wins.

== Objective ==
The objective of a game of netball is to score more goals than the opposition. Goals are scored when the ball is passed to team members in the goal circle who then shoot the ball through the goal ring.

== Court and dimensions ==
A netball court is divided into thirds.

Netball is played on either a hard or soft court with scoring hoops or "rings" at both ends. The court is slightly larger than a basketball court, being 30.5 metres (100 ft) long and 15.25 metres (50.0 ft) wide. The longer sides are called "side lines" and the shorter sides are called "goal lines" or "back lines". The two lines dividing the court into thirds are called "transverse lines". Court markings are no more than 50 millimetres (2 in) wide. The court is divided into thirds which regulate where individuals of each position are allowed to move. A 0.9-metre (3 ft)-diameter "centre circle" is located in the centre of the court. At each end of the court there is a 4.9-metre (16 ft)-radius semi-circular "shooting circle" or "goal circle" from within which all scoring shots must be taken. The goal posts are 3.05 metres (10.0 ft) high from the top of the ring to the ground and have no backboards. The rings have an internal diameter of 380 millimetres (15 in), and are located 150 millimetres (6 in) forward from the post and are made of 15-millimetre (0.6 in) diameter steel.

== The ball ==
The ball is made of leather, rubber or similar material, measures 680 to 710 millimetres (27 to 28 in) in circumference and weighs 397 to 454 grams (14 to 16 oz). For INF sanctioned competitions, Gilbert is the official supplier of netball balls.

== Playing time ==
A game is played in four quarters, each lasting fifteen minutes. There are intervals of three minutes between the first and second quarters and between the third and fourth quarters, and an interval of five minutes at half time. If an umpire or player calls time, the time keeper pauses the timer. When play resumes, the timer is restarted. A maximum of two minutes is allowed for an injury. Overtimes, in elimination games, consist of two straight seven-minute periods; if still tied after fourteen minutes, whoever is up two points will win.

== Positions ==
There are seven players on each team, who are given nominated, named positions. Each player must wear a "bib" showing one of the abbreviations below, indicating that player's position. Each player is only allowed in certain areas of the court: a player in a section of the court that is not part of their playing area is deemed "offside". The positions are described below:

Position name	Abbreviation	Allowed in	Notes
Goal shooter	GS	Attacking third including goal circle	Often, but not always, defended by the opposing goal keeper. Main role is to shoot goals, by working closely with goal attack to achieve positions in the shooting circle where one can receive passes from the feeding midcourt players.
Goal attack	GA	Centre and attacking third including goal circle	Often defended by the opposing goal defence. As well as sharing the goal shooter's role to shoot goals, the goal attack is responsible for helping to set up offensive plays.
Wing attack	WA	Centre and attacking third excluding goal circle	Often defended by the opposing wing defence. Main role is to move the ball from centre court to an attacking position. Accurate passing using a variety of styles including bounce passing, drop passing and faking a pass is important in this position.
Centre	C	Anywhere except the goal circles	Involved in defensive and offensive plays, and responsible for restarting play after a goal is scored. Players in this position require a high level of fitness.
Wing defence	WD	Centre and defensive third excluding goal circle	Usually defends against the wing attack. Often involved in blocking offensive plays from the opposing team, and may also be called upon to guard against the goal attack or goal shooter by preventing them from entering the goal circle.
Goal defence	GD	Centre and defensive third including goal circle	Usually defends against the goal attack. Main role is to assist the goal keeper in defending the goal against the opposing shooters.
Goal keeper	GK	Defensive third including goal circle	A specialised defensive position. Often the last person who can keep the opposing shooters from scoring. Also responsible for taking throw-ins in the defensive third of the court. Accuracy in passing and predicting where the ball will go are keys to playing this position well.

The Fast5 variation of netball only has five positions: goal shooter (GS), goal attack (GA), centre (C), goal defence (GD), and goal keeper (GK).

== Starting and restarting play ==
When a goal is scored or at the start of a quarter/overtime, play is resumed from the centre of the court using a "centre pass". These passes alternate between the teams, regardless of which team scored the last goal. A centre pass is made by a player in the centre position who must have one foot grounded within the centre circle. As the game restarts, only the two centre players are allowed in the centre third: when the umpire blows the whistle to restart play, the goal attack, goal defence, wing attack and wing defence players can move into the centre third to receive the pass. The centre pass must be caught or touched in the centre third.

If the ball touches the ground outside the court boundaries, then a member of the team that was not the last to touch the ball before it went out is able to throw the ball back into the court to restart play.

== Stepping, footwork, and passing ==
Netball rules do not permit players to let their landing foot touch the ground again if it is lifted at all while in possession of the ball, so players can take 1.5 steps while holding the ball. Pivoting does not count as a step. Players are entitled to balance on the other foot if the landing foot is lifted. An infraction of this rule is usually called stepping or travelling, as in the similar rule in basketball. Consequently, the only way to move the ball towards the goal is to throw the ball to a teammate.

The ball can be held by a player for less than three seconds at any time. A player may tap or deflect the ball, let it bounce and then take possession and throw it. The player cannot catch the ball with both hands, drop it and pick it up again; this is called a replayed ball. The duration before it is called a drop is determined by the umpire. These rules, combined with the restrictions on where one player of a particular position can move, ensure that everyone on the team is regularly involved in play.

=== Passing ===
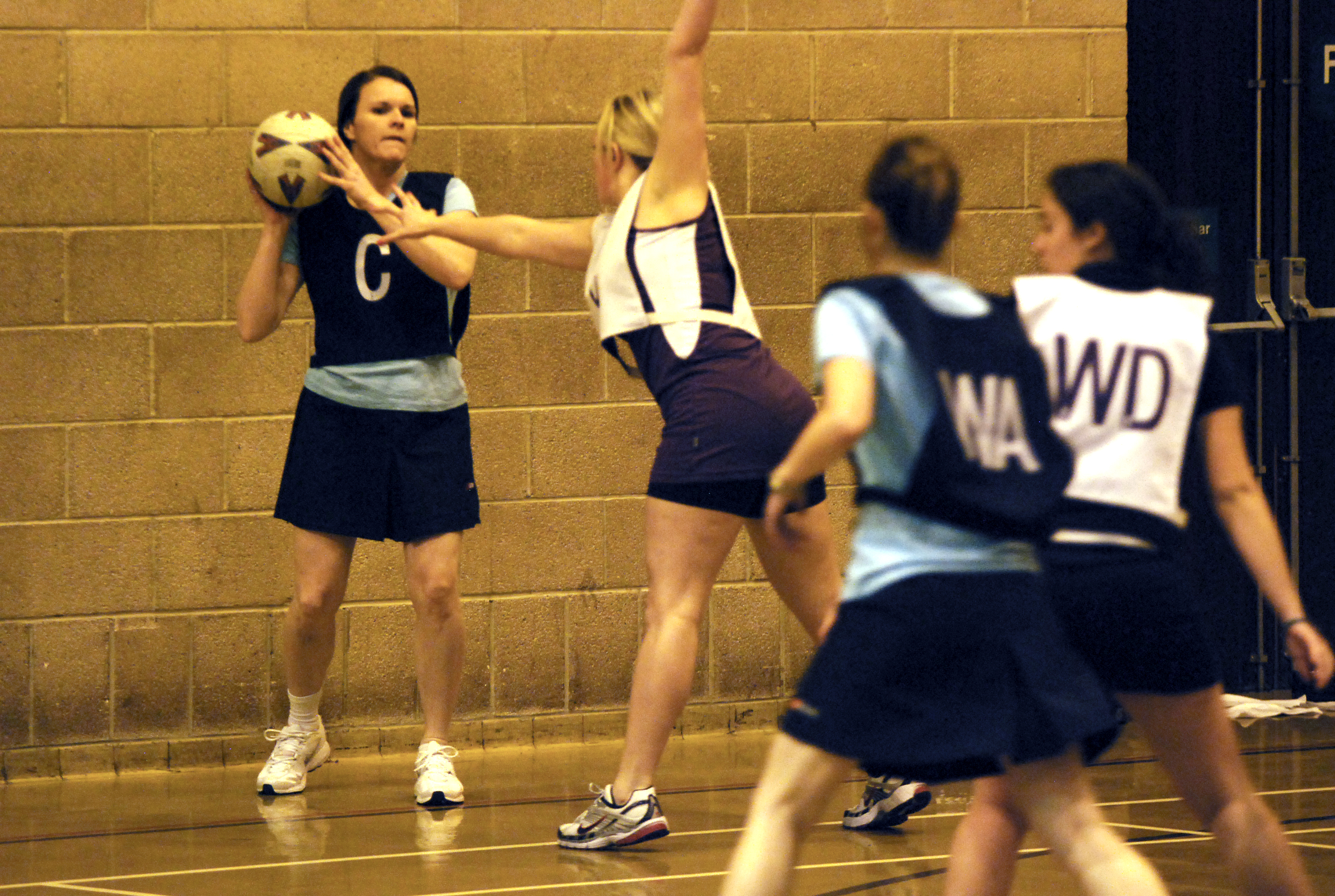
A netball player preparing to pass the ball

Netball strategy involves several types of passes, including centre passes, penalty passes and short passes. A centre pass occurs after a goal has been scored, when the centre passes the ball. A short pass is a pass between two players on the same team, where the length of the pass is so short that a defensive player cannot get between the two opposing players to intercept the ball. A penalty pass is a pass where the ball is returned from the sideline into play. This pass occurs after a penalty has been called.

There are several styles of passing the ball, including one-handed shouldered passes, two-handed passes (chest-passes), overhead passes, bounce passes, lob passes, drop passes, bullet passes and underarm passes.

The one-handed shoulder pass involves holding the ball in one hand behind the shoulder with the elbow bent, and weight on the back foot. The passer then shifts the weight to the forward foot, while moving the ball with their hand forward and extending the elbow, and releasing the ball as the elbow fully extends at shoulder height. The purpose of the one-handed shoulder pass is to throw the ball a long distance while throwing the ball hard, fast and direct.

The two-handed pass is sometimes called a chest-pass. It is executed by holding the ball at chest height with the passer having their elbows bent next to the body at chest height. The passer then moves the ball forward, extending their elbows forward while they step forward and release the ball. The purpose of the two-handed pass is to accurately deliver the ball to another player who is in motion. It is used because it ensures accuracy, both for long and short distances.

The overhead pass is executed similarly to the two-handed pass. The difference is that it is executed over the passer's head. The overhead pass may also be executed similarly to the one-handed shoulder pass, with the difference being that the movements are done overhead, instead of at shoulder height.

The bounce pass is executed by getting low to the ground, holding the ball with one or two hands at hip height, and stepping forward while releasing the ball. The ball should be aimed low at the ground and released with a great deal of force. The purpose of the bounce pass is to move the ball around an opponent. It is used when a player is in a confined space, with limited passing options.

The lob pass is executed by throwing the ball in a high arc, with the ball initially being held behind the head and being released above the head. The drop pass is similar to the lob pass. The major difference is with the catcher: a lob pass is for a catcher who is stretching to get away from a defender, while a drop pass is for a catcher who will move into free space to receive the ball. These two passes are sometimes referred to as throw-up passes. The purpose of the lob and drop passes is to get around a defender and reach a teammate who is moving away from the passer. The lob pass is used because it is very accurate and covers both long and short distances.

The side pass is a two-handed pass. It is used in situations requiring quick, straight throws. The bullet pass is a one-handed pass. It is used as a short or medium pass. The pass is fast and direct. The underarm pass is a one-handed pass. This short pass style is used in situations where an element of surprise is required.

Different positions require different passing skills. The fake pass should be mastered by every position. The centre pass should be mastered by the centre. The centre should also master any pass that must be made on the run. Both the goal attack and wing attack should be familiar with the long passes and the lob and drop pass. The goal attack should also be familiar with all styles of passing. The goal shooter should know how to do penalty passes. The wing defence should also be comfortable making lob passes. The goal defence should know how to make goal-line passes. The goal keeper should be comfortable making penalty passes and inbounding the ball.

== Contact and obstruction ==
Contact is only permitted provided it does not impede an opponent or the general play and players must be at least 0.9 metres (3 ft) away from a player with the ball while attempting to defend. If impeding contact is made, a penalty is given to the team of the player who was contacted, and the player who contacted must stand "out of play", meaning they cannot participate in play until the player taking the penalty has passed the ball.

== Scoring goals ==
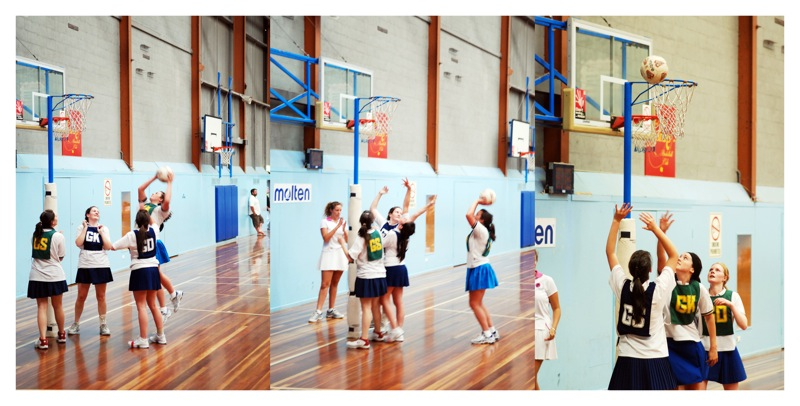
Attempts at scoring goals during a junior netball match in Australia

Only the goal attack and goal shooter are able to score goals directly, and this may only be done from the inside of the semicircle. The job of the goal defence and goal keeper is to block the goal attack and goal shooter from shooting; however, they must be three feet or more away from the landing foot of the shooter, otherwise it is called an obstruction. In this penalty situation, the goal keeper or goal defence must stand by the shooter's side for a penalty pass or shot, and must remain out of play until the ball is thrown. A ball that passes through the hoop, but has been thrown either from outside the circle or by a player other than the two shooters, is deemed a "no goal". Furthermore, a shooter (GA or GS) may not shoot for a goal if a "free pass" has been awarded for an infringement such as stepping, offside, or using the post.

If a player completely misses a shot, the player may not catch it; if they do, it is called a "replay", and a free pass is awarded to the other team. If the ball is deflected off the goal keeper or goal defence and goes through the goal ring, it is a no goal and play continues.

== History of the rules ==
In 1893, Martina Bergman-Österberg informally introduced one version of basketball to her female physical training students at the Hampstead Physical Training College in London, after having seen the game being played in the United States. The rules of this game were modified at Madame Österberg's college over several years. Substantial revisions were made during a visit in 1897 from another American teacher, Miss Porter, who introduced rules from women's basketball in the United States; the game also moved outdoors onto grass courts, the playing court was divided into three zones, and the baskets were replaced with rings that had nets. By 1960, the rules of netball were standardised internationally. An international governing body was formed to oversee the sport globally, now called the International Netball Federation (INF).

At the INF Congress 2013 in Glasgow, the INF announced that the Rules of Netball would be freely available online for individual use to assist the growth and development of the sport.

== Bibliography ==
- All England Netball Association. "History of Netball (1891–2001)" (PDF).
- All England Netball Association (2002). Netball. Know the Game (Fourth ed.). London: A & C Black. ISBN 0-7136-6002-3.
- All England Netball Association (1994). Netball. Know the Game (First ed.). London: A & C Black. ISBN 0-7136-3675-0.
- Alswang, Joel (2003). The South African dictionary of sport. Spearhead. ISBN 0-86486-535-X. OCLC 249075345.
- United States of America Netball Association (USANA), Inc. (10 October 2010). "About Us". United States of America Netball Association.
- Davis, Luke; Davis, Damien (2006). Netball. Getting into. Macmillan Education. ISBN 0-7329-9987-1. OCLC 156762948.
- Dix, Noleen (1984). Australian Netball Skills. Hawthorn, Victoria: Five Mile Press. ISBN 978-0-86788-066-3. OCLC 27589776.
- Hickey, Julia; Navin, Anita (2007). Understanding netball. Coachwise. ISBN 978-1-905540-12-9. OCLC 174094782.
- International Netball (September 2006). "netball rules". International Netball.
- International Federation of Netball Associations (15 June 2008). "History of Netball". Archived from the original on 6 March 2011.
- Liverpool University Women's Basketball Club. "Basketball to Netball". Liverpool Lions - Origins and Development of Basketball. Liverpool, England.
- Murrary, Peter (2008). Netball, The International Sport. Bath, England: Murray Books (Australia). ISBN 978-1-4075-2962-2. OCLC 700886957.
- Netball Australia. "Court & venue specifications". Netball Australia. Archived from the original on 27 February 2011.
- Shakespear, Wilma (1997). Netball : steps to success. Champaign, Illinois: Human Kinetics. ISBN 0-87322-984-3. OCLC 36446893.
- Shakespear, Wilma; Caldow, Margaret (2009). Netball : steps to success. Champaign, Illinois: Human Kinetics. ISBN 978-0-7360-7984-6. OCLC 251227987.
- Slade, Dennis (2009). Transforming Play: Teaching Tactics and Game Sense. Champaign, Illinois: Human Kinetics. ISBN 978-0-7360-7518-3. OCLC 423215335.
- Smith, Marian; Humberstone, Brian (1978). Netball, The Greatest Team Sport for Women. Stanmore, New South Wales: Cassell Australia. ISBN 0-7269-3719-3. OCLC 255137644.
- Treagus, Mandy (January 2005). "Playing Like Ladies: Basketball, Netball and Feminine Restraint". International Journal of the History of Sport. 22 (1): 88–105. doi:10.1080/0952336052000314593.
