= 2012 World University Netball Championship =

International netball tournament hosted by South Africa

Tournament details
- Host country: South Africa
- Venue: Good Hope Centre
- Dates: 2–7 July 2012
- Teams: 8

Final positions
- Champions: Great Britain (1st title)
- Runners-up: South Africa
- Third place: Jamaica

Tournament statistics
- Matches played: 24

The 2012 World University Netball Championship was the inaugural World University Netball Championship tournament. The tournament was organised by the Fédération Internationale du Sport Universitaire and University Sports South Africa. It was hosted at Cape Town's Good Hope Centre between 2 July and 7 July 2012. It was won by Great Britain who defeated the host nation, South Africa 53–49 in the final. Jamaica finished third after defeating Northern Ireland 41–30 in the bronze medal match.

== Teams, head coaches and captains ==
Team	Head coach	Captain
Great Britain	Colette Thomson	Natalie Haythornthwaite
Jamaica	Paula Daley Morris	Trishell Williams
Namibia	Manuel Tjivera	
Northern Ireland ^{1}	Elaine McLaughlin Rice	Oonagh McCullough
South Africa	Dorette Badenhorst	Maryka Holtzhausen
Uganda	Rashid Mubiru	Irene Mirembe
United States ^{2}	Ilze Gideons	Shallyn Reeves
Zimbabwe		Prudence Goreraza

Notes

- ^1 It was initially planned that Ireland would send an All-Ireland team, featuring players from both Northern Ireland and the Republic of Ireland. However no players from the Republic were selected for the final squad. As a result, it was effectively a Northern Ireland team that competed in the tournament.
- ^2 The United States were represented by a Netball America team.

== Group A ==
=== Matches ===
Monday, 2 July 2012	South Africa	57–47	Northern Ireland

Monday, 2 July 2012	Zimbabwe	35–34	United States

Tuesday, 3 July 2012	South Africa	110–12	Zimbabwe

Tuesday, 3 July 2012	Northern Ireland	67–16	United States
		Report

Wednesday, 4 July 2012	Northern Ireland	83–27	Zimbabwe

Wednesday, 4 July 2012	South Africa	93–14	United States

=== Table ===
Pos	Team	P	W	D	L	GF	GA	GD	Pts
1	South Africa	3	3	0	0	260	73	+187	6
2	Northern Ireland	3	2	0	1	197	100	+97	4
3	Zimbabwe	3	1	0	2	74	227	-153	2
4	United States	3	0	0	3	64	195	-131	0

Qualified for quarter-final vs Group B 4th place team
Qualified for quarter-final vs Group B 3rd place team
Qualified for quarter-final vs Group B 2nd place team
Qualified for quarter-final vs Group B 1st place team

== Group B ==
=== Matches ===
Monday, 2 July 2012	Great Britain	46–44	Jamaica

Monday, 2 July 2012	Uganda	44–4	Namibia

Tuesday, 3 July 2012	Jamaica	44–39	Uganda

Tuesday, 3 July 2012	Great Britain	62-33	Namibia

Wednesday, 4 July 2012	Great Britain	45–44	Uganda

Wednesday, 4 July 2012	Jamaica	68–35	Namibia

=== Table ===
Pos	Team	P	W	D	L	GF	GA	GD	Pts
1	Great Britain	3	3	0	0	153	121	+32	6
2	Jamaica	3	2	0	1	156	120	+36	4
3	Uganda	3	1	0	2	127	93	+34	2
4	Namibia	3	0	0	3	72	174	-102	0

Qualified for quarter-final vs Group A 4th place team
Qualified for quarter-final vs Group A 3rd place team
Qualified for quarter-final vs Group A 2nd place team
Qualified for quarter-final vs Group A 1st place team

== Quarter-finals ==
Thursday, 5 July 2012	South Africa	67–26	Namibia
10.00

Thursday, 5 July 2012	Northern Ireland	45–43	Uganda
12.00

Thursday, 5 July 2012	Jamaica	87–15	Zimbabwe
14.00

Thursday, 5 July 2012	Great Britain	82–14	United States
16.00

== Classification ==
=== 5th/8th classification ===
Friday, 6 July 2012	Namibia	96–21	Zimbabwe
12:00

Friday, 6 July 2012	Uganda	72–18	United States
16:00

=== 7th/8th playoff ===
Saturday, 7 July 2012	Zimbabwe	43–41	United States

=== 5th/6th playoff ===
Saturday, 7 July 2012	Uganda	51–38	Namibia

== Medal competition ==
=== Semi-finals ===
Friday, 6 July 2012	South Africa	41–39	Jamaica
10:00

Friday, 6 July 2012	Great Britain	52–37	Northern Ireland
14:00

=== Bronze medal match ===
Saturday, 7 July 2012	Jamaica	41–30	Northern Ireland

=== Gold medal match ===
Saturday, 7 July 2012	South Africa	49–53	Great Britain

== Final placings ==
Place	Nation
1st place, gold medalist(s)	Great Britain
2nd place, silver medalist(s)	South Africa
3rd place, bronze medalist(s)	Jamaica
4	Northern Ireland
5	Uganda
6	Namibia
7	Zimbabwe
8	United States

== Medallists ==
Gold	Silver	Bronze
Great Britain; Coach: Colette Thomson	South Africa; Coach: Dorette Badenhorst	Jamaica; Coach: Paula Daley Morris
Stephanie Burt; Sophia Candappa; Beth Cobden; Kadeen Corbin; Jade Forbes-Wattley; Jodie Gibson; Natalie Haythornthwaite (c); Rachel Mulloy; Yasmin Parsons; Mia Ritchie (vc); Rachel Shaw; Lauren Steadman	Marie Geel; Maryka Holtzhausen (c); Danique du Toit; Vanes-Mari du Toit; Karla Mostert (vc); Bongiwe Msomi; Melissa Myburgh; Anja Opperman	Naudia Brown; Shadian Hemmings; Malysha Kelly; Vanessa Walker; Trishell Williams (c)
