= 2016 World University Netball Championship =

International netball tournament hosted by the United States

Tournament details
- Host country: United States
- City: Miami
- Venue(s): Fernandez Family Center, St. Thomas University
- Dates: 13–17 July 2016
- Teams: 8
- TV partner(s): Eurosport; Vamos Deportes en Vivo

Final positions
- Champions: South Africa (1st title)
- Runners-up: Jamaica
- Third place: Australia

Tournament statistics
- Matches played: 24

The 2016 World University Netball Championship was a tournament organised by the Fédération Internationale du Sport Universitaire and Netball America. It was the second World University Netball Championship. It was hosted at the Fernandez Family Center at St. Thomas University in Miami. The championship was won by South Africa who defeated Jamaica 43–39 in the gold medal match. Australia finished third after they defeated Uganda 42–41 in the bronze medal match. The series was featured on Eurosport and livestreamed by Vamos Deportes en Vivo.

== Teams, head coaches and captains ==
Team	Head coach	Captain
Australia ^{1}	Christine Vogue	
England ^{2}	Michelle Morgan	Erin Allport
Jamaica	Annette Daley	
Namibia		Augusta Sethie
South Africa	Dorette Badenhorst	
Trinidad and Tobago	Bridget Adams	Daystar Swift
Uganda	Rashid Mubiru	Ruth Meeme
United States ^{3}	Ilsa Giddens	Alyssa Spitzer

Notes

- ^1 Australia were represented by the Griffith University netball team.
- ^2 England were represented by the University of Worcester netball team. In March 2016, Worcester had won the BUCS netball title.
- ^3 The United States were represented by a Netball America team.

== Match officials ==
Umpires included

Umpire	Association
Alison Davies	Wales
Lilia Mathurin-Cameron	Trinidad and Tobago
Sarah Watts	England

== Pool A ==
=== Matches ===
Round 1

Wednesday, 13 July 2016	United States	18–93	South Africa
10:00

Wednesday, 13 July 2016	Namibia	^{(Note 4)}	Trinidad and Tobago
11:30

Round 2

Wednesday, 13 July 2016	South Africa	78–32	Namibia
16:00

Wednesday, 13 July 2016	United States	39–55	Trinidad and Tobago
17:30

Round 3

Thursday, 14 July 2016	United States	14–63	Namibia
13:00

Thursday, 14 July 2016	South Africa	64–26	Trinidad and Tobago
14:30

=== Table ===
Pos	Team	P	W	D	L	GF	GA	GD	Pts
1	South Africa	3	3	0	0	235	76	+159	6
2	Namibia	3	2	0	1				4
3	Trinidad and Tobago	3	1	0	2				2
4	United States	3	0	0	3	71	211	-140	0

Qualified for quarter-final vs Pool B 4th place team
Qualified for quarter-final vs Pool B 3rd place team
Qualified for quarter-final vs Pool B 2nd place team
Qualified for quarter-final vs Pool B 1st place team

Note

- ^4 The match between Namibia and Trinidad and Tobago is listed as a forfeit. Namibia are listed as winners.

== Pool B ==
=== Matches ===
Round 1

Wednesday, 13 July 2016	Uganda	73–37	England
13:00		Report

Wednesday, 13 July 2016	Jamaica	42–38	Australia
14:30

Round 2

Thursday, 14 July 2016	Uganda	54–46	Australia
10:00		Report

Thursday, 14 July 2016	Jamaica	79–24	England
11:30

Round 3

Thursday, 14 July 2016	Australia	71–39	England
16:00

Thursday, 14 July 2016	Jamaica	53–30	Uganda
17:30

=== Table ===
Pos	Team	P	W	D	L	GF	GA	GD	Pts
1	Jamaica	3	3	0	0	174	92	+82	6
2	Uganda	3	2	0	1	157	136	+21	4
3	Australia	3	1	0	2	155	135	-20	2
4	England	3	0	0	3	100	223	-123	0

Qualified for quarter-final vs Pool A 4th place team
Qualified for quarter-final vs Pool A 3rd place team
Qualified for quarter-final vs Pool A 2nd place team
Qualified for quarter-final vs Pool A 1st place team

== Quarter-finals ==
Friday, 14 July 2016	South Africa	71–30	England
10:00

Friday, 14 July 2016	Australia	61–44	Namibia
12:00

Friday, 14 July 2016	Uganda	54–33	Trinidad and Tobago
14:00

Friday, 14 July 2016	United States	9–98	Jamaica
14:00		Report

== Classification ==
=== 5th/8th classification ===
Saturday, 16 July 2016	Trinidad and Tobago	49–37	England
12:00

Saturday, 16 July 2016	United States	24–64	Namibia
16:15

=== 7th/8th playoff ===
Sunday, 17 July 2016	United States	28–71	England
9:00

=== 5th/6th playoff ===
Sunday, 17 July 2016	Namibia	52–38	Trinidad and Tobago
9:00

== Medal competition ==
=== Semi-finals ===
Saturday, 16 July 2016	South Africa	52–42	Uganda
10:00

Saturday, 16 July 2016	Jamaica	45–38	Australia
14:15

=== Bronze medal match ===
Sunday, 17 July 2016	Australia	42–41	Uganda
13:00

=== Gold medal match ===
Sunday, 17 July 2016	South Africa	43–39	Jamaica
15:00

== Final placings ==
Rank	Team
1st place, gold medalist(s)	South Africa
2nd place, silver medalist(s)	Jamaica
3rd place, bronze medalist(s)	Australia
4	Uganda
5	Namibia
6	Trinidad and Tobago
7	England
8	United States

== Medallists ==
Gold	Silver	Bronze
South Africa; Coach: Dorette Badenhorst	Jamaica; Coach: Annette Daley	Australia; Coach: Christine Vogue
Charmaine Baard; Sigrid Burger; Lauren Lee Christians; Zandre Kruger; Lindi Lombard; Izette Lubbe; Karla Mostert; Juline Rossouw; Jeanie Steyn; Renske Stoltz; Kifiloe Tsotetsi; Nadia Uys; Shadine van der Merwe	Shanice Beckford; Nicole Dixon; Stacian Facey; Malysha Kelly; Abbeygail Linton; Kaneila Riley; Deneen Taylor; Adean Thomas; Priscilla Thomas; Jamila Tulloch; Khadijah Williams	Courteney Chapman; Peta Coles; Chany Harrex; Rylie Holland; Cara Koenen; Leah Middleton; Michelle Newgrosh; Kristen Oxenford; Ruby Paton; Denise Pepe; Bree Purvis; Cheryl Renagi
