= Netball in Botswana =

- Country: Botswana
- Governing body: Botswana Netball Association
- National team: Botswana

National competitions
- Spar – "Good for You" Netball League

Netball in Botswana is primarily played by women. Girls are introduced to netball at primary schools, as part of the school curriculum.

== History ==
The Botswana Netball Association is the national organization responsible for netball in Botswana. It was founded in the 1970s. It is a member of IFNA and COSANA (Confederation of Southern African Netball Associations).

During the 1970s, netball was offered as a school sport to students attending private international schools.

Men have traditionally served as officials, coaches and administrators for the sport. They also had their own teams. This started to change in the 2000s, with men-only teams having been discontinued in favor of mixed gendered teams.

== National competition ==
Botswana has 30 local graded umpires and 22 locally trained coaches who have been certified by Netball South Africa.

Spar – "Good for You" Netball League is the most important national netball competition in Botswana. Naming rights for the league were given to Spar in 2010. The league is divided into two divisions, north and south. Games for the 2010 season began on May 22. The league championships were held on 27 November 2010 at the BONA Courts in Gaborone.

== International competition ==
Botswana competed in the annual COSANA tournament in 2008.

As of August 2016, the women's national team was ranked number twentieth in the world.

== Bibliography ==
- BNSC (11 May 2010). "Spar Netball League". BNSC. Archived from the original on 6 July 2011.
- BNSC (11 May 2011). "Botswana Netball Association". BNSC. Archived from the original on 6 July 2011.
- DaCosta, Lamartine P.; Miragaya, Ana (2002). Worldwide experiences and trends in sport for all. Meyer & Meyer Sport. ISBN 1-84126-085-1. OCLC 248362122.
- International Federation of Netball Associations (21 January 2011a). "Current World Rankings". Archived from the original on 19 May 2011.
- International Schools Services (1981). The ISS directory of overseas schools. International Schools Services. OCLC 183198083.
- Netball Singapore (2011b). "Milestones". Archived from the original on 18 February 2011.
- Nyasa Times Reporter (10 April 2008). "Malawi U-21 netball in Lesotho for Cosana". Nyasa Times. Archived from the original on 7 March 2011.
