= 2014 AFNA Championships =

International netball series hosted by Canada

Tournament details
- Host country: Canada
- City: Calgary
- Venue: SAIT Polytechnic
- Dates: 19–25 August 2014
- Teams: 7

Final positions
- Champions: Trinidad and Tobago (12th title)
- Runners-up: Barbados
- Third place: United States

Tournament statistics
- Matches played: 21

The 2014 AFNA Championships was a tournament organised by the Americas Federation of Netball Associations. It featured seven teams playing a series of netball test matches in August 2014 at Calgary's SAIT Polytechnic. The tournament also served as an Americas qualifier for the 2015 Netball World Cup. The hosts, Canada, were joined by six other national netball teams. Trinidad and Tobago and Barbados eventually finished as winners and runners up. They subsequently joined Jamaica at the World Cup. Jamaica qualified for the World Cup via the INF World Rankings and did not take part in this series.

== Teams, head coaches and captains ==
Team	Head coach	Captain
Argentina		
Barbados		
Canada		
Cayman Islands		Katherine Gow
Grenada		
Trinidad and Tobago	Wesley Gomes	
United States		

== Matches ==
=== Day 1 ===
Tuesday, 19 August 2014	Canada	58–26	Cayman Islands	Court 1
17.00

Tuesday, 19 August 2014	Barbados	89–8	Argentina	Court 2
17:30

Tuesday, 19 August 2014	Trinidad and Tobago	68–28	United States	Court 1
19:00

=== Day 2 ===
Wednesday, 20 August 2014	Barbados	57–26	United States	Court 1
16:30

Wednesday, 20 August 2014	Grenada	48–35	Cayman Islands	Court 2
17:00

Wednesday, 20 August 2014	Canada	73–13	Argentina	Court 1
18:30

=== Day 3 ===
Thursday, 21 August 2014	Trinidad and Tobago	68–18	Cayman Islands	Court 1
16:30

Thursday, 21 August 2014	United States	82–15	Argentina	Court 2
17:00

Thursday, 21 August 2014	Canada	56–38	Grenada	Court 1
18:30		Report

=== Day 4 ===
Friday, 22 August 2014	United States	62–28	Grenada	Court 1
16:30

Friday, 22 August 2014	Barbados	87–12	Cayman Islands	Court 2
17:00

Friday, 22 August 2014	Canada	38–59	Trinidad and Tobago	Court 1
18:30

=== Day 5 ===
Saturday, 23 August 2014	Trinidad and Tobago	116–11	Argentina	Court 1
16:30

Saturday, 23 August 2014	United States	50–19	Cayman Islands	Court 2
17:00

Saturday, 23 August 2014	Barbados	76–23	Grenada	Court 1
18:30

=== Day 6 ===
Sunday, 24 August 2014	Canada	37–62	Barbados	Court 1
16:30

Sunday, 24 August 2014	Trinidad and Tobago	82–31	Grenada	Court 2
17:00

Sunday, 24 August 2014	Cayman Islands	55–27	Argentina	Court 1
18:30

=== Day 7 ===
Monday, 25 August 2014	Canada	40–42	United States	Court 1
16:30

Monday, 25 August 2014	Grenada	70–39	Argentina	Court 2
17:00

Monday, 25 August 2014	Trinidad and Tobago	53–46	Barbados	Court 1
18:30

== Final table ==
Pos	Team	P	W	D	L	GF	GA	GD	Pts
1	Trinidad and Tobago	6	6	0	0	446	172	+274	12
2	Barbados	6	5	0	1	417	159	+258	10
3	United States	6	4	0	2	290	260	+30	8
4	Canada	6	3	0	3	302	240	+62	6
5	Grenada	6	2	0	4	238	350	-112	4
6	Cayman Islands	6	1	0	5	165	366	-201	2
7	Argentina	6	0	0	6	113	485	-372	0

Qualified for the 2015 Netball World Cup
