= Netball in India =

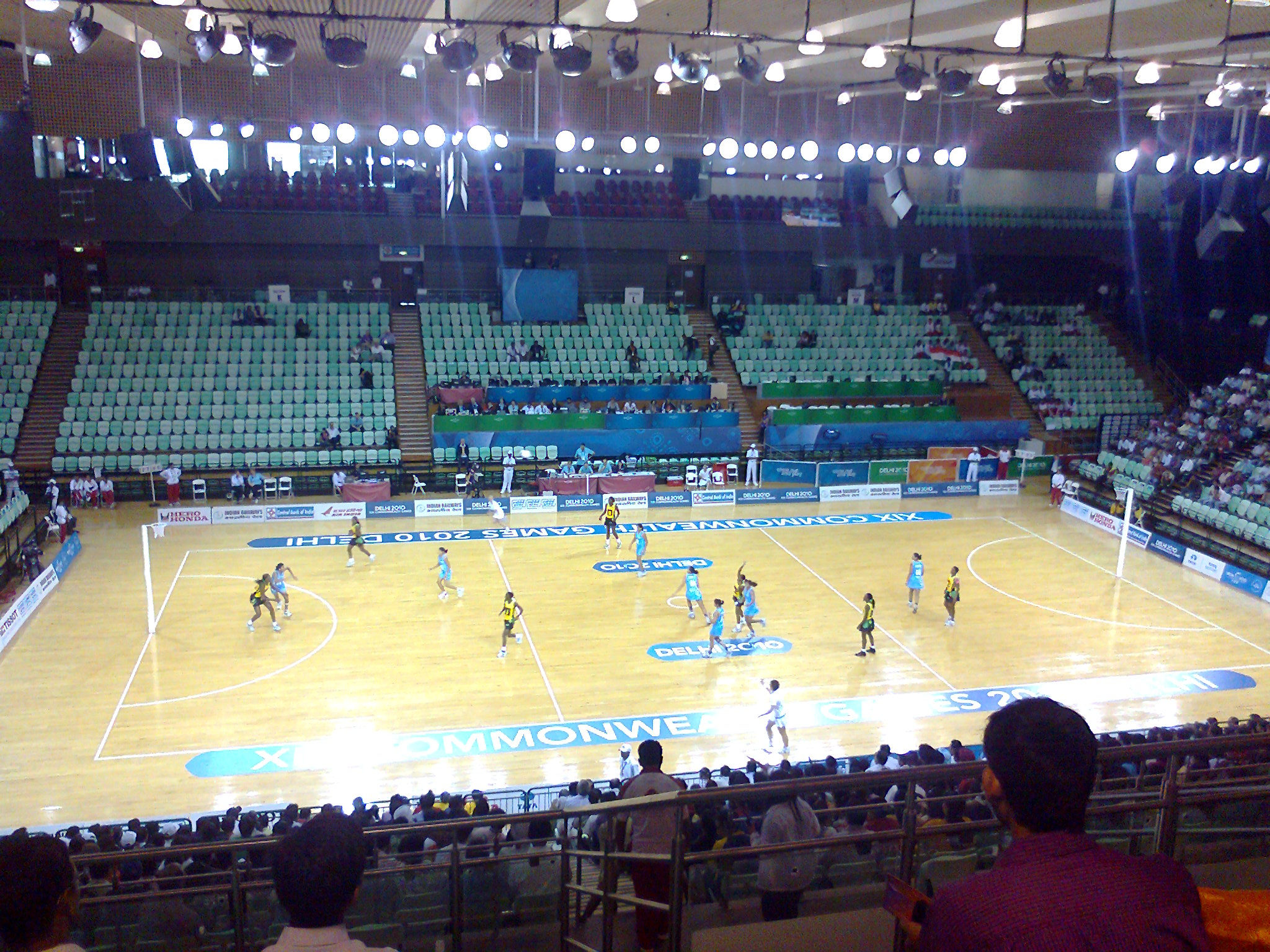
- India (blue) playing Jamaica (yellow) in netball at the 2010 Commonwealth Games in Delhi.
- Country: India
- Governing body: Netball Federation of India
- National team: India

Women started playing netball in India as early as 1926. The Sports Authority of India and the Government of India have provided funding with the goal of improving the performance of the country's youth national teams.

The Netball Federation of India was established in 1978 by Jagat Singh Chouhan from Haryana, an alumnus of the YMCA College of Physical Education of Madras. His efforts in Germany during the 1972 Munich Olympics helped in making these a legacy in India.

The national team competed in the fifth Asian Netball Championships in Colombo in 2001. Team captains included Prachi Tehlan, who captained the side that competed in the Commonwealth Games in Delhi. Some of the important netball competitions held in India include:

- 2010 Commonwealth Games
- 7th Asian Youth Netball Championship held from 3 to 10 July 2010 at Thyagaraj Stadium

Some of the top performances for the India national netball team include:

- 2010 Asian Youth Netball Championship: Fourth place
- 2011 South Asian Beach Games: (silver) Silver medal

== Bibliography ==
- Government of Sri Lanka (21 July 2001). "5th Asian Netball Championship next week in Colombo". Archived from the original on 26 January 2004.
- International Federation of Netball Associations (21 January 2011a). "Current World Rankings". Archived from the original on 19 May 2011.
- International Federation of Netball Associations (2011) [15 June 2008]. "History of Netball". Archived from the original on 6 March 2011.
- Netball Singapore (2011b). "Milestones". Archived from the original on 18 February 2011.
- Netball Singapore (13 December 2010a). "NTUC FairPrice Foundation Nations Cup 2010". Archived from the original on 6 March 2011.
- Sagar, Naresh (4 July 2010). "Asian Youth Netball Championship". Sagar Media. Archived from the original on 15 July 2011.
