= Netball in Tanzania =

One of the most popular sports in Tanzania

- Country: Tanzania
- Governing body: Netball Association of Tanzania (CHANETA)
- National team: Tanzania
- Nickname: Taifa Queens

Netball was one of the most popular sports in Tanzania. The sport was introduced to the country after the World War I, when the country was under British colonial rule. The sport was intended for leisure and first played in schools. For this reason, almost all primary schools in the country have a court. Recruitment for the national team and other high level teams started at that level. Netball Association of Tanzania (CHANETA) was created in 1966. Women have historically dominated in leadership positions in CHANETA but men are still involved, especially in roles like coaching. During the 1970s and 1980s, there was a push by the International Olympic Committee and the British Council to promote sport and women's sport in Tanzania. Despite netball being the most popular women's sport at the time, no investment was made into the sport.

Netball's popularity declined during the 1990s as a result of economic liberalisation. Courts were not maintained, leagues were closed and there were fewer competitions. Trying to raise netball's popularity in the country again has been hampered by the fact that sport is culturally more acceptable for men. Top-level teams in the country, prior to the 1990s, have included Tanzania Harbour Authority, and Tanzania Postal and Telecommunication.

Tanzania's national team is called the Taifa Queens. In their opening match in the NTUC Fairprice Foundation Nations Cup 2010, against Singapore, they won 52–36. Mwanaidi Hassan was the team's star player in the tournament. Some of the top performances for the Tanzania national netball team include third place at the 2010 Nations Cup. As of August 2016, the women's national team was not ranked in the world.

== Bibliography ==
- International Federation of Netball Associations (21 January 2011a). "Current World Rankings". Archived from the original on 19 May 2011.
- International Federation of Netball Associations (10 December 2010e). "Netball Weekly Roundup". Archived from the original on 14 March 2011.
- Massoa, Prisca; Fasting, Kari (December 2002). "Women and sport in Tanzania". In Pfister, Gertrud; Hartmann-Tews, Ilse (eds.). Sport and Women: Social Issues in International Perspective. International Society for Comparative Physical Education & Sport. Routledge. ISBN 0-415-24628-8.
- Netball Singapore (13 December 2010a). "NTUC FairPrice Foundation Nations Cup 2010". Archived from the original on 6 March 2011.
