= USA Netball =

Netball governing body in the United States

- Sport: Netball
- Jurisdiction: United States
- Abbreviation: USANA
- Founded: 1992
- Affiliation: World Netball; Americas Netball
- Headquarters: New York City

Official website
- usanetball.org

USA Netball is the official governing body for netball in the United States. It was founded in 1992 as the United States of America Netball Association. It is affiliated to World Netball and Americas Netball. It is responsible for organising and administering the United States national netball team. Together with Netball America, it is one of two rival governing bodies.

== History ==
=== Foundation ===
The inaugural meeting of the United States of America Netball Association took place in New York City on 23 May 1992, and was chaired by the president of the Bronx Netball Association, Dr. Yvonne Thomas. Thomas went on to become the USANA's first president. The meeting was also attended by representatives of the Florida Netball Association, the American Netball Association of New York State, the Texas Netball Association and the Massachusetts State Netball League. Other attendees included Pat Taylor, the then president of the International Federation of Netball Associations, and Lystra Lewis, the then president of Americas Federation of Netball Associations. By 1993, USANA had hosted its first national championship. Lewis returned to present the Lystra Lewis Trophy to the winner. The United States national netball team subsequently made their debut at the 1995 World Netball Championships.

=== Split ===
In 2006 and 2007, USA Netball experienced an exodus of administrators due to allegations and reports of corruption and unethical behaviour. These issues were reported to World Netball. However, according to an Australian Broadcasting Corporation report, they were never acted upon. The majority of USA Netball's affiliated members, clubs and associations subsequently left the organisation and formed a new governing body, Netball America.

== Competitions ==
=== USA Netball National Championships ===
Since 1996, USA Netball has organised a national championship. It features men's division.

=== USA Netball National Premier League ===
USA Netball also organises the National Premier League. It features women's, men's and mixed divisions.

== Presidents ==
Years	President
1992–199x	Dr. Yvonne Thomas
	Jackie Shaw
	Lorraine Pierre
	Pat Gray
	Ava Foster
	Sonia Rodney
	Edina Bayne
	Saundra Gray
2013–2016	Natalie Moodie
2016–2023	Patrick Heron
2023–	Radica Wright
