= United States national netball team =

National netball team

United States
- Nickname(s): Flying Eagles
- Association: USA Netball
- Confederation: Americas Netball
- World ranking: n/a
Uniform colors

Netball World Cup
- Appearances: 3 (Debuted in 1995)
- 2003 placing: 9th
- Best result: 9th (2003)

The United States national netball team, also known as the Flying Eagles, represents USA Netball in international netball competitions. They featured at the 1995, 1999 and 2003 World Netball Championships. Since then, the United States have competed in AFNA Championships and Netball World Cup Qualifiers. As of 1 March 2026, the United States are not listed on the World Netball Rankings.

== Tournament history ==
=== Major tournaments ===
==== Netball World Cup ====
The USA Netball Association was founded in 1990 and the United States national netball team subsequently made their debut at the 1995 World Netball Championships.

Tournaments	Place
1995 World Netball Championships	14th
1999 World Netball Championships	15th
2003 World Netball Championships	9th

=== Americas tournaments ===
==== Netball World Cup Qualifiers ====
Tournaments	Place
2006 AFNA Championships	7th ^{1}
2010 AFNA World Netball Championship qualifiers	3rd
2014 AFNA Championships	3rd ^{2}
2018 AFNA Championships	6th ^{3}
2023 Netball World Cup Regional Qualifier – Americas	6th

==== AFNA Championships ====
Tournaments	Place
2006 AFNA Championships	7th ^{1}
2012 AFNA Championships	6th
2014 AFNA Championships	3rd ^{1}
2018 AFNA Championships	6th ^{3}

Notes

- ^1 The 2006 AFNA Championships also counted as a 2007 World Netball Championships Qualifier.
- ^2 The 2014 AFNA Championships also counted as a 2015 Netball World Cup Qualifier.
- ^3 The 2018 AFNA Championships also counted as a 2019 Netball World Cup Qualifier.

=== Invitational tournaments ===
Tournaments	Place
2013 Netball Singapore Nations Cup	6th
2016 Netball Europe Open Challenge	3rd

== Notable players ==
=== 2025–26 squad ===
United States roster
Players
Coaches

Name	Pos	DOB	Height	Club	Nat	Caps
Joanna Bingham	C, GK, GD		–	Connecticut Netball
Kristen Bruwer			–
Natalie Coleman			–
Natasha Coleman	GS, WA		–
Andrea Dortch			–
Sasha Lee Graham	GS, GA		–
Oshina Graham			–
Britanya Green	GD, GK		–
Veajah Hylton			–	Georgia
Elizabeth Lidi			–	Santa Rosa
Brittan McCarthy			–
Mignon Du Plessis			–
Tamsyn Sayles	GD, GK		–
Mariah Stearman	GA		–
Michelle Subrattie			–
Leba Waqa			–	Santa Rosa
Gabrielle Woods			–

Head coach

- ??

Notes

- (c) – Captain
- (cc) – Co-captain
- (vc) – Vice-captain
- – Injury / maternity leave
- (TRP) – Temporary Replacement Player

=== Captains ===
Captains	Years
Donecia Antrobus	2003
Michelle Subrattie	
Shaina Wilson	2022

== Coaches ==
=== Head coaches ===
Coach	Years
Adrienne Spencer	1995, 2003
Robert Whyte	2010
Greyson-Superville	2022

== The American Netball Team ==
Netball America also organises a national netball team, which they have branded The American Netball Team and nicknamed The Stars. This team evolved from the Netball America teams that represented the United States at the 2012, 2016 and 2018 World University Netball Championships. More recently they have entered teams, including mixed and men's teams in the Dubai Sevens netball tournament. Their 2025 women's team was coached by Jill McIntosh.
