= Netball America =

Netball governing body in the United States

- Sport: Netball
- Jurisdiction: United States
- Membership: 50+ clubs
- Abbreviation: NA
- Founded: 2007
- Headquarters: Westminster, California

Official website
- netballamerica.com

Netball America is a governing body for netball in the United States. It was founded in 2007. Together with USA Netball, it is one of two rival governing bodies. Since 2009, Netball America has hosted the U.S. Open Netball Championships, featuring women's and mixed teams. Netball America also organises a national netball team, which they have branded The American Netball Team and nicknamed The Stars. They represented the United States at the 2012, 2016 and 2018 World University Netball Championships. Netball America also hosted the 2016 tournament.

== History ==
=== Foundation ===
In 2006 and 2007, USA Netball experienced an exodus of administrators due to allegations and reports of corruption and unethical behaviour. These issues were reported to World Netball. However, according to an Australian Broadcasting Corporation report, they were never acted upon. The majority of USA Netball's affiliated members, clubs and associations subsequently left the organisation and formed a new governing body, Netball America. The four founding members included Steve Anderson, Moreen Logsdon, Jo O'Key and Sonya Ottaway. Ottaway was an Australian American and a former United States international. She became president of the new organisation. One of the main aims of the new organisation was to develop netball in the United States among American citizens.

== Competitions ==
=== U.S. Open Netball Championships ===
Since 2009, Netball America has hosted the U.S. Open Netball Championships, featuring women's and mixed teams. It's MVP award is named after Vicki Wilson. The 2022 tournament was played in Las Vegas and featured 24 teams with players from 12 different countries and 22 different states and territories of the United States. The 2024 tournament was played in Phoenix, Arizona and won by a team representing Cheshire. The 2025 tournament was played in Greater Austin and guests included Sigrid Burger.

=== USA National Netball League ===
In November 2023, Netball America launched the USA National Netball League. In May 2024, they announced the first six teams to join the new league. Woodlands Warriors were announced as hosts of the first six matches.

| Teams | City/Suburb | State |
|---|---|---|
| Austin Retros | Austin | Texas |
| Carolina Nets | Durham | North Carolina |
| Crusaders ATL Sports Club | Atlanta | Georgia |
| DC Dragons | Washington, D.C. | |
| MINC | Manhattan, New York City | New York |
| Woodlands Warriors | The Woodlands | Texas |

== The American Netball Team ==
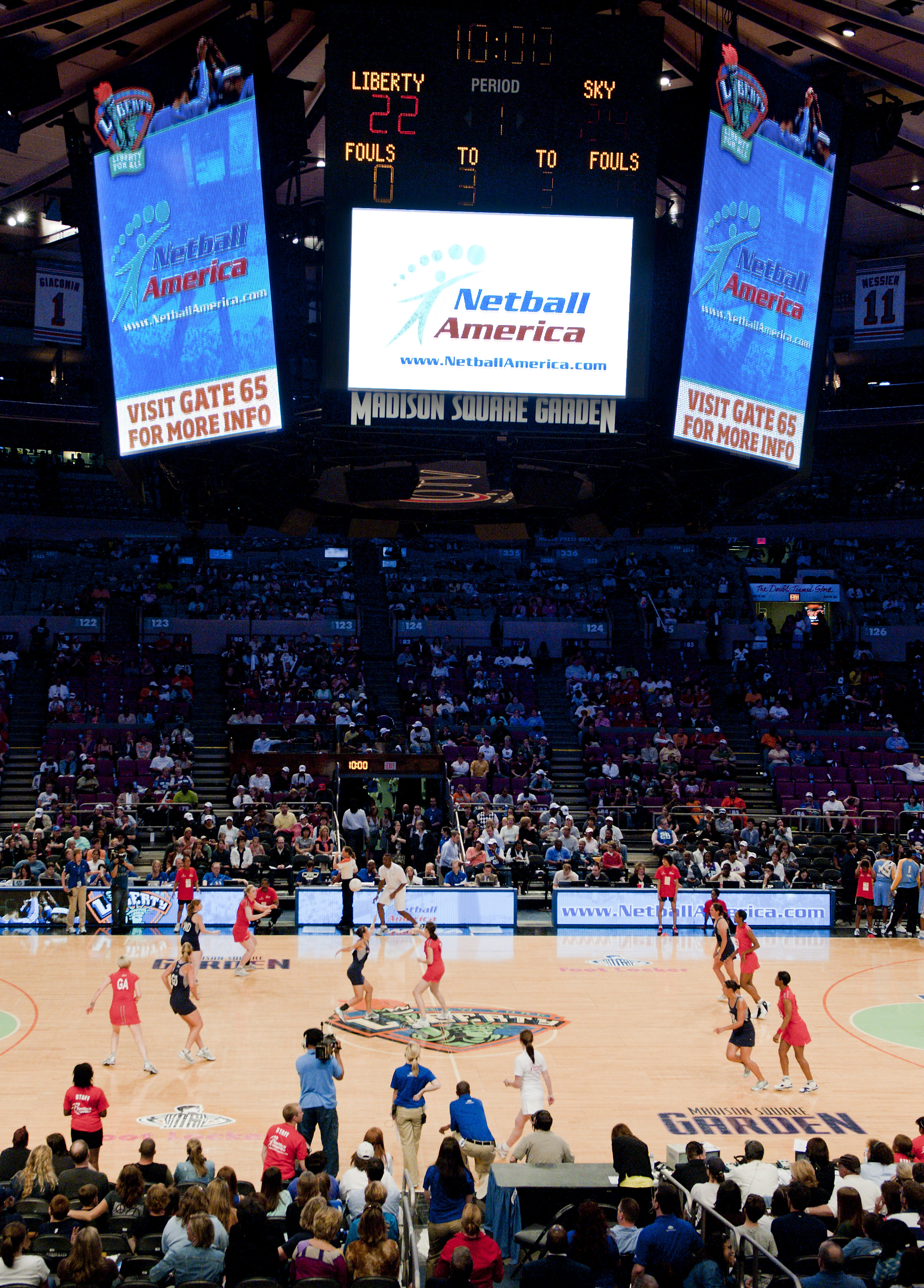
16 May 2010: Netball was showcased at Madison Square Garden during the New York Liberty 2010 WNBA season home opener. The exhibition was organized by Netball America to help increase awareness of netball in the United States.

Netball America also organises a national netball team, which they have branded The American Netball Team and nicknamed The Stars. This team evolved from the Netball America teams that represented the United States at the 2012, 2016 and 2018 World University Netball Championships. Netball America sent the first team of American citizens to the 2012 tournament. They hosted the 2016 tournament at St. Thomas University in Miami, Florida. More recently they have entered teams, including mixed and men's teams in the Dubai Sevens netball tournament. Their 2025 women's team was coached by Jill McIntosh.

| Tournaments | Place |
|---|---|
| 2012 World University Netball Championship | 8th |
| 2016 World University Netball Championship | 8th |
| 2018 World University Netball Championship | 6th |

== Partnerships ==
Netball America has formed various partnerships with other organisations and bodies to help promote netball in the United States. These include:

- United States Australian Football League
- Women's National Basketball Association
- The President's Challenge
- New York City Housing Authority
- Miami-Dade County
