= 2008 AFNA Championships =

International netball series hosted by Saint Vincent and the Grenadines

Tournament details
- Host country: Saint Vincent and the Grenadines
- City: Arnos Vale
- Venue: Arnos Vale Sporting Complex
- Dates: 20–25 July 2008
- Teams: 6

Final positions
- Champions: Jamaica (10th title)
- Runners-up: Trinidad and Tobago
- Third place: Barbados

Tournament statistics
- Matches played: 15
- Top scorer(s): Anastacia Wilson; Trinidad and Tobago; 150/179 (84%)

The 2008 AFNA Championships was a series organised by the Americas Federation of Netball Associations. It featured six teams playing a series of netball test matches in July 2008 at Arnos Vale's Sporting Complex. The hosts, Saint Vincent and the Grenadines, were joined by five other national netball teams. With a team coached by Connie Francis and captained by Simone Forbes, Jamaica won the series after winning all five of their matches. The series was effectively a qualifier for the 2010 Commonwealth Games. It was the first AFNA tournament were teams could earn INF World Rankings points.

== Teams, head coaches and captains ==
| Team | Head coach | Captain |
|---|---|---|
| Barbados | Harriet Waithe | Don Small |
| Canada | Ann Willcocks ? | |
| Jamaica | Connie Francis | Simone Forbes |
| Saint Lucia | | |
| Saint Vincent and the Grenadines | Dellarice Duncan | Skiddy Francis-Crick |
| Trinidad and Tobago | | Rhonda John-Davis |

== Debutants ==
- Samantha Wallace made her senior debut for Trinidad and Tobago.
- Malysha Kelly made her senior debut for Jamaica.

== Match officials ==
Umpires

| Umpire | Association |
|---|---|
| Dave Browne | Jamaica |
| Annemarie Dickson | Trinidad and Tobago |
| Michael English | Canada |
| Veronica Harris | Barbados |
| Dalton Hinds | Jamaica |
| Pamala Proverbs | Barbados |
| Joel Young-Strong | Trinidad and Tobago |

== Matches ==
=== Day 1 ===
| Sunday, 20 July 2008 | Jamaica | 54–21 | Saint Lucia |
| | Christina Solmon 22/27 (81%); Vanessa Walker 20/28 (71%); Crystal Gordon 12/14 (86%) | | Shem Maxwell 13/17 (76%); Barbara Theobalds 8/11 (73%) |

| Sunday, 20 July 2008 | Saint Vincent and the Grenadines | 51–30 | Canada |
| | Skiddy Francis Crick 29/32 (91%); Leanna Lewis 13/15 (87%); Joanna Christopher 8/9 (89%); Nicole Sandy 1/3 (33%) | | Marilyn Hope 24/38 (63%); Sabrina Versteeg 6/14 (43%) |

| Sunday, 20 July 2008 | Trinidad and Tobago | 49–36 | Barbados |

=== Day 2 ===
| Monday, 21 July 2008 | Jamaica | 69–17 | Canada |
| | Crystal Gordon 27/29 (93%); Simone Forbes 20/24 (83%); Christina Solmon 19/22 (86%); Vanessa Walker 3/3 (100%) | | Marilyn Hope 15/22 (68%); Sabrina Versteeg 2/5 (40%) |

| Monday, 21 July 2008 | Trinidad and Tobago | 50–29 | Saint Lucia |
| | Anastascia Wilson 34/40 (85%); Joelisa Cooper 13/20 (65%); Simone Morgan 3/5 (60%) | | Shem Maxwell 19/22 (86%); Barbara Joseph-Theobalds 5/9 (56%); Roxanne Snyder 5/7 (71%) |

| Monday, 21 July 2008 | Saint Vincent and the Grenadines | 36–52 | Barbados |
| | Skiddy Francis Crick 15/16 (94%); Leanna Lewis 7/7 (100%); Joanna Christopher 7/12 (58%); Nicole Sandy 7/9 (78%) | | Laurel Browne 27/28 (96%); Nikita Piggott 20/23 (87%); Lydia Bishop 5/5 (100%) |

=== Day 3 ===
| Tuesday, 22 July 2008 | Saint Lucia | 47–41 | Canada |

| Tuesday, 22 July 2008 | Jamaica | 52–35 | Barbados |
| | Simone Forbes 21/26 (81%); Crystal Gordon 26/30 (87%); Christina Solmon 5/7 (71%) | | Laurel Browne; Lydia Bishop; Nikita Piggott |

| Tuesday, 22 July 2008 | Saint Vincent and the Grenadines | 33–51 | Trinidad and Tobago |
| | Leanna Lewis 14/20 (70%); Joanna Christopher 13/15 (87%); Nicole Sandy 6/8 (75%) | | Anastascia Wilson 40/47 (85%); Joelisa Cooper 11/18 (61%) |

=== Day 4 ===
| Wednesday, 23 July 2008 | Saint Vincent and the Grenadines | 21–58 | Jamaica |

| Wednesday, 23 July 2008 | Trinidad and Tobago | 59–39 | Canada |

| Wednesday, 23 July 2008 | Barbados | 54–35 | Saint Lucia |

=== Day 5 ===
| Friday, 25 July 2008 | Saint Vincent and the Grenadines | 38–40 | Saint Lucia |
| | Joanna Christopher 18/25 (72%); Leanna Lewis 16/21 (76%); Skiddy Francis Crick 4/5 (80%) | | Shem Maxwell 34/43 (79%); Roxanne Snyder 6/12 (50%) |

| Friday, 25 July 2008 | Barbados | 59–44 | Canada |
| | Laurel Browne 23/26 (88%); Lydia Bishop 18/19 (95%); Nikita Piggott 18/21 (86%) |

| Friday, 25 July 2008 | Jamaica | 53–32 | Trinidad and Tobago |
| | Simone Forbes 27/30 (90%); Crystal Gordon 20/28 (71%); Christina Solmon 3/3 (100%); Vanessa Walker 3/4 (75%) | | Anastascia Wilson 27/33 (82%); Joelisa Cooper 5/10 (50%) |

== Final table ==
| Pos | Team | P | W | L | D | GF | GA | GD | Pts |
|---|---|---|---|---|---|---|---|---|---|
| 1 | Jamaica | 5 | 5 | 0 | 0 | 286 | 126 | +160 | 10 |
| 2 | Trinidad and Tobago | 5 | 4 | 1 | 0 | 241 | 190 | +51 | 8 |
| 3 | Barbados | 5 | 3 | 2 | 0 | 236 | 216 | +20 | 6 |
| 4 | Saint Lucia | 5 | 2 | 3 | 0 | 171 | 237 | -65 | 4 |
| 5 | Saint Vincent and the Grenadines | 5 | 1 | 4 | 0 | 179 | 231 | -52 | 2 |
| 6 | Canada | 5 | 0 | 5 | 0 | 171 | 285 | -114 | 0 |

Invited to the 2010 Commonwealth Games

== Statistics ==
Goal Shooters (by %)
| Pos. | Player | Team | Goals (%) |
|---|---|---|---|
| 1 | Lydia Bishop | Barbados | 69/76 (91%) |
| 2 | Laurel Browne | Barbados | 113/129 (88%) |
| 3 | Skiddy Francis Crick | Saint Vincent and the Grenadines | 59/69 (86%) |
| 4 | Anastacia Wilson | Trinidad and Tobago | 150/179 (84%) |
| 5 | Shem Maxwell | Saint Lucia | 115/138 (83%) |
| 6 | Nikita Piggott | Barbados | 54/65 (83%) |
| 7 | Simone Forbes | Jamaica | 91/110 (83%) |
| 8 | Christina Solmon | Jamaica | 66/80 (83%) |
| 9 | Crystal Gordan | Jamaica | 103/125 (82%) |
| 10 | Samantha Wallace | Trinidad and Tobago | 30/38 (79%) |

== Top three squads ==
| Winners | Runners Up | Third |
|---|---|---|
| Jamaica; Coach: Connie Francis | Trinidad and Tobago; Coach: | Barbados; Coach: Harriet Waithe |
| Nicole Aiken; Nadine Bryan (vc); Simone Forbes (c); Nichala Gibson; Crystal Gordon; Malysha Kelly; Samantha Mundle; Tracey Robinson; Christina Solmon; Sabina Spence; Sateva Taylor; Vanessa Walker | Joelisa Cooper; Kemba Duncan; Rhonda John-Davis (c); Crystal George; Anika La Roche; Tricia Liverpool; Simone Morgan; Samantha Wallace; Anastascia Wilson | Salisa Auguste; Lydia Bishop; Laurel Browne (vc); Janeice Clarke; Sherry Martindale; Kizzy Marville; Rhe-Ann Niles; Nikita Piggott; Lisa Puckerin; Dionne Quarless; Janelle Sealy; Don Small (c); Sabrina Smith |
