= Netball at the Central American and Caribbean Games =

International netball series organised by Americas Netball

- Most recent season or competition: Netball at the 2026 Central American and Caribbean Games
- Sport: Netball
- First season: 2023
- Owners: Americas Netball; Centro Caribe Sports
- Most recent champion: Trinidad and Tobago
- Most titles: Trinidad and Tobago; Jamaica (1 title each)

Netball at the Central American and Caribbean Games is an international netball series organised by Americas Netball and Centro Caribe Sports. The Jamaica Olympic Association had campaigned for netball to be included and in November 2021 it was confirmed that it would feature at the 2023 Central American and Caribbean Games. Jamaica won the inaugural 2023 tournament.

== History ==
=== Tournaments ===
Games	Gold	Silver	Bronze
2023	Jamaica	Trinidad and Tobago	Saint Vincent and the Grenadines
2026	Trinidad and Tobago	Jamaica	Saint Lucia

== Participants ==
Team	(El Salvador) 2023	(Dominican Republic) 2026
Barbados	4th	4th
Bermuda	–	5th
Cayman Islands	5th	–
Dominican Republic	6th	6th
Jamaica	1st	2nd
Saint Lucia	–	3rd
Saint Vincent and the Grenadines	3rd	–
Trinidad and Tobago	2nd	1st
