= 2006 AFNA Championships =

International netball series hosted by Barbados

Tournament details
- Host country: Barbados
- City: Bridgetown
- Venue: Garfield Sobers Gymnasium
- Dates: 10–19 August 2006
- Teams: 8

Final positions
- Champions: Trinidad and Tobago
- Runners-up: Barbados
- Third place: Saint Vincent and the Grenadines

Tournament statistics
- Matches played: 28

The 2006 AFNA Championships was a tournament organised by the Americas Federation of Netball Associations. It featured eight teams playing a series of netball test matches in August 2006 at Bridgetown's Garfield Sobers Gymnasium. The tournament also served as an Americas qualifier for the 2007 World Netball Championships. The hosts, Barbados, were joined by seven other national netball teams. Trinidad and Tobago and Barbados eventually finished as winners and runners up and qualified for the 2007 World Netball Championships. Jamaica had already qualified after finishing third at the 2003 World Netball Championships.

== Teams, head coaches and captains ==
Team	Head coach	Captain
Antigua and Barbuda		
Barbados		
Canada		
Guyana		
Saint Kitts and Nevis		
Saint Vincent and the Grenadines		
Trinidad and Tobago	Grace Parkinson-Griffith	Simone Bowen-Sandy
United States		

== Matches ==
=== Round 1 ===
Thursday, 10 August 2006	Barbados	62–26	Antigua and Barbuda
	Lydia Bishop 44/50 (88%); Olivia Walcott 14/18 (78%); Coleen Griffith 4/7 (57%)		Karen Joseph 15/20 (75%); Seymone Parkes 4/5 (80%); Khandy Jones 7/9 (78%)

Friday, 11 August 2006	Trinidad and Tobago	56–34	Saint Kitts and Nevis
	Janelle Barker 37/47 (79%); Lystra Zamore 19/28 (68%)		Isles 19/26 (73%); Thompson 15/25 (60%)

Friday, 11 August 2006	Saint Vincent and the Grenadines	86–16	Guyana

Friday, 11 August 2006	Canada	42–25	United States
	Maralyn Hope 24; Sabrina Versteeg 18/39 (46%)		McArthur 8/11 (73%); Morrison 8/8 (100%); Morgan 5/9 (56%); Logsdon 4/6 (67%)

=== Round 2 ===
Saturday, 12 August 2006	Saint Kitts and Nevis	v	Antigua and Barbuda
16:00

Saturday, 12 August 2006	Barbados	49–23	Canada
18:00	Olivia Walcott 21/32 (66%); Mathurin 5/7 (71%) ?? 23		Maralyn Hope 14/25 (56%); Sabrina Versteeg 5/5 (100%)

Saturday, 12 August 2006	Trinidad and Tobago	60–15	United States
20:00	Janelle Barker 44/51 (86%); Lystra Zamore 12/14 (86%); Tricia Liverpool 4/13 (31%)		Washington 14/26 (54%); Morrison 1/5 (20%)

=== Round 3 ===
Sunday, 13 August 2006	Canada	bt	Saint Kitts and Nevis
16:00

Monday, 14 August 2006	Saint Vincent and the Grenadines	50–42	Antigua and Barbuda
	Gailene Gordon 31/37 (84%); Leeana Lewis 19/28 (68%)		Karen Joseph 26/30 (87%); Khandy Jones 11/13 (85%); Seymone Parkes 5/8 (63%)

Monday, 14 August 2006	Trinidad and Tobago	78–14	Guyana
	Tricia Liverpool 51/70 (73%); Lystra Zamore 27/33 (82%)		Angeline Dyer 11/16 (69%); Keturah Rahaman 2/4 (50%); Addis Anderson 1/3 (33%)

=== Round 4 ===
Tuesday, 15 August 2006	Antigua and Barbuda	61–27	Guyana
	Seymone Parkes 27/35 (77%); Karen Joseph 19/24 (79%); Candacy Jones 15/17 (88%)		Angeline Dyer 24/33 (73%); Addis Anderson 3/10 (30%)

Tuesday, 15 August 2006	Saint Vincent and the Grenadines	41–37	Canada
	Gailene Gordon 20/27 (74%); Leeana Lewis 16/18 (89%); Annette King 5/12 (42%)		Sabrina Versteeg 16/27 (59%); Maralyn Hope 15/20 (75%); Keisha Wilson 6/7 (86%)

Tuesday, 15 August 2006	Barbados	48–17	United States
	Lydia Bishop 30/35 (86%); Mathurin 18/33 (55%)		Morrison 8/10 (80%); Thomas 4/6 (67%); Washington 3/7 (43%); Logsdon 2/12 (17%)

=== Round 5 ===
Wednesday, 16 August 2006	Saint Kitts and Nevis	v	Guyana
18:00

Wednesday, 16 August 2006	Trinidad and Tobago	48–41	Saint Vincent and the Grenadines
20:00

=== Round 6 ===
Friday, 18 August 2006	Canada	bt	Guyana
14:30

Friday, 18 August 2006	Trinidad and Tobago	bt	Antigua and Barbuda

Friday, 18 August 2006	Saint Kitts and Nevis	v	United States

Friday, 18 August 2006	Barbados	46–46	Saint Vincent and the Grenadines
		Report

=== Round 7 ===
Saturday, 19 August 2006	Canada	41–28	Antigua and Barbuda
	Butler 25/34 (74%) ?? 16		Khandy Jones 16/22 (73%); Seymone Parkes 12/16 (75%)

Saturday, 19 August 2006	Saint Vincent and the Grenadines	64–26	United States
	Gailene Gordon 40/48 (83%); Leeana Lewis 24/30 (80%)		McArthur 19/15 (127%); Morrison ??

Saturday, 19 August 2006	Trinidad and Tobago	46–40	Barbados
	Janelle Barker 24/36 (67%); Lystra Zamore 22/27 (81%)		Lydia Bishop 25/27 (93%); Olivia Walcott 15/18 (83%)

=== Other matches ===
Barbados	bt	Saint Kitts and Nevis

United States	v	Guyana

Barbados	bt	Guyana

United States	v	Antigua and Barbuda

Saint Vincent and the Grenadines	bt	Saint Kitts and Nevis

== Final table ==
Pos	Team	P	W	D	L	GF	GA	GD	Pts
1	Trinidad and Tobago	7	7	0	0				10
2	Barbados	7	5	1	1				11
3	Saint Vincent and the Grenadines	7	5	1	1				11
4	Canada	7	4	0	3				8
5	Antigua and Barbuda	7							
6	Saint Kitts and Nevis	7							
7	United States	7							
8	Guyana	7							

Qualified for the 2007 World Netball Championships

== Award winners ==
Award	Winner	Team
Most Valuable Player	Lystra Zamore	Trinidad and Tobago
Most Improved Player	Ayanna Hamlet	Trinidad and Tobago

== Top three squads ==
Winners	Runners Up	Third
Trinidad and Tobago; Coach: Grace Parkinson-Griffith	Barbados; Coach:	Saint Vincent and the Grenadines; Coach:
Janelle Barker; Simone Bowen-Sandy (c); Crystal George; Glennis Hall; Ayanna Hamlet; Sonia Jack; Rhonda John-Davis; Anika LaRoche; Tricia Liverpool; Simone Morgan; Natalie Pierre; Anastascia Wilson; Lystra Zamore	Lydia Bishop; Coleen Griffith ?? Mathurin; Olivia Walcott	
