= Barbados national netball team =

National netball team

Barbados
- Nickname(s): Bajan Gems
- Association: Barbados Netball Association
- Confederation: Americas Netball
- Captain: Damisha Croney
- Most caps: Latonia Blackman (203)
- World ranking: 19th
Gold uniform	Blue uniform

Netball World Cup
- Appearances: 10 (Debuted in 1979)
- 2023 placing: 19th
- Best result: 6th (1987)

Commonwealth Games
- Appearances: 7 (Debuted in 1998)
- 2022 placing: 12th
- Best result: 7th (2010)

The Barbados national netball team represents the Barbados Netball Association in international netball tournaments such as the Netball World Cup and Netball at the Commonwealth Games. Barbados have also played in AFNA Championships, Netball World Cup Qualifiers, the ECCB International Netball Series and the Central American and Caribbean Games. As of 1 March 2026, Barbados are listed 19th on the World Netball Rankings.

== Tournament history ==
=== Major tournaments ===
==== Netball World Cup ====
Barbados first participated in the Netball World Cup in 1979 when they finished 8th. Their highest finish came in 1987 when they finished in equal 6th place.

Tournaments	Place
1979 World Netball Tournament	8th
1987 World Netball Tournament	6th
1995 World Netball Championships	11th
1999 World Netball Championships	10th
2003 World Netball Championships	7th
2007 World Netball Championships	13th
2011 World Netball Championships	11th
2015 Netball World Cup	13th
2019 Netball World Cup	12th
2023 Netball World Cup	14th

==== Commonwealth Games ====
Between 1998 and 2022, Barbados competed at every netball tournament at the Commonwealth Games. Their best performance came in 2010 when they finished 7th after beating Trinidad and Tobago 60–59 in a classification match. However, Barbados failed to qualify for the 2026 Commonwealth Games after finishing outside the top twelve in the November 2025 World Netball Rankings.

Tournaments	Place
1998 Commonwealth Games	8th
2002 Commonwealth Games	9th
2006 Commonwealth Games	10th
2010 Commonwealth Games	7th
2014 Commonwealth Games	11th
2018 Commonwealth Games	10th
2022 Commonwealth Games	12th

=== Americas tournaments ===
==== West Indies, Caribbean, AFNA Championships ====
The Barbados national netball team has been active since at least 1956. In 1954, Grenada, Saint Vincent and the Grenadines and Trinidad and Tobago began playing in a triangular tournament. Barbados subsequently joined them two years later. These tournaments subsequently evolved into the West Indies Netball Championship, the Caribbean Netball Championship and eventually the AFNA Championships. Barbados hosted tournaments in 1961, 2006 and 2008. In both 1992 and 1993, Barbados, Saint Vincent and the Grenadines and Trinidad and Tobago finished as joint winners.

Tournaments	Place
1956 West Indies Netball Championship	
1961 West Indies Netball Championship	
1982 Caribbean Netball Championships	3rd
1984 Caribbean Netball Championships	2nd ^{1}
1985 Caribbean Netball Championships	3rd
1992 Caribbean Netball Championships	1st ^{2}
1993 Caribbean Netball Championships	1st ^{2}
1994 AFNA Championships	
1997 AFNA Championship	3rd
1998 AFNA Championship	2nd
2006 AFNA Championships	2nd ^{3}
2008 AFNA Championships	3rd
2012 AFNA Championships	2nd
2014 AFNA Championships	2nd ^{4}
2018 AFNA Championships	2nd ^{5}

==== Netball World Cup qualifiers ====
Tournaments	Place
2006 AFNA Championships	2nd ^{3}
2010 AFNA World Netball Championship qualifiers	2nd
2014 AFNA Championships	2nd ^{4}
2018 AFNA Championships	2nd ^{5}
2023 Netball World Cup Regional Qualifier – Americas	3rd

Notes

- ^1 In 1984, Barbados and Saint Vincent and the Grenadines finished as joint runners-up.
- ^2 In both 1992 and 1993, Barbados, Saint Vincent and the Grenadines and Trinidad and Tobago finished as joint winners.
- ^3 The 2006 AFNA Championships also counted as a 2007 World Netball Championships qualifier.
- ^4 The 2014 AFNA Championships also counted as a 2015 Netball World Cup qualifier.
- ^5 The 2018 AFNA Championships also counted as a 2019 Netball World Cup qualifier.

==== ECCB International Netball Series ====
Tournaments	Place
2022 ECCB International Netball Series	
2023 ECCB International Netball Series	
2025 ECCB International Netball Series	

==== Central American and Caribbean Games ====
Tournaments	Place
2023 Central American and Caribbean Games	4th
2026 Central American and Caribbean Games	4th

== Notable players ==
=== Recent squad ===
This recent squad was selected for the 2023 Netball World Cup.

Barbados roster
Players
Coaches

Pos.	Name	Age - DOB	Ht.	Club	Club nat.
Faye Agard (c)	GS, GK	(aged 37)	1.81 m (5 ft 11 in)			59
Kimani Archer	WD, C		–
Latonia Blackman	WD, GD, GK	6 October 1982 (aged 40)	1.77 m (5 ft 10 in)	Pride of Villa	(Barbados)	181
Carla Boyce	GK, GD	(aged 41)	1.72 m (5 ft 8 in)			0
Kadeen Corbin	GS, GA	27 November 1991 (aged 31)	1.77 m (5 ft 10 in)	Team Bath	(England)	78
Sasha Corbin	WA, C	23 April 1988 (aged 35)	1.70 m (5 ft 7 in)	Saracens Mavericks	(England)	77
Brianna Holder	GS, GA	20 June 2001 (aged 22)	1.68 m (5 ft 6 in)			42
Teresa Howell	C, WD	(aged 27)	1.79 m (5 ft 10 in)			40
Amanda Knight	WA, C, WD	21 April 2000 (aged 23)	1.69 m (5 ft 7 in)			21
Victoria Moverville	GK, GD		–
Tonisha Rock-Yaw (vc)	WD, C	20 August 1993 (aged 29)	1.78 m (5 ft 10 in)			67
Jada Smith	GS, GA		–
Akeena Stoute	GK, GD	(aged 25)	1.74 m (5 ft 9 in)			29
Tamara Trotman	GD, GK	(aged 28)	1.72 m (5 ft 8 in)			9
Damia Walrond	GS, GA	(aged 20)	1.85 m (6 ft 1 in)			4

Head coach

- Denise Alleyne

Notes

- (c) – Captain
- (cc) – Co-captain
- (vc) – Vice-captain
- – Injury / maternity leave
- (TRP) – Temporary Replacement Player

=== Captains ===
Captain	Years
Marva Sealy	1979
Denise Morgan	1987, 1999, 2015
Veneisha Cadogan	1995
Stacey Ford	1999
Cheryl Squires	2003
Julie Phillips	2003, 2006
Don Small	2008
Latonia Blackman	2010
Kizzy Marville	2011
Latonia Blackman	2014
Rhe-Ann Niles	2015, 2018
Damisha Croney	2019
Latonia Blackman	2022
Shonette Azore-Bruce	2022
Faye Agard	2023
Damisha Croney	2025

=== England internationals ===
Player	England Apps	Years	Barbados Apps	Years
Kadeen Corbin	72	2011–2021		2023
Sasha Corbin	71	2007–2019		2023

== Head coaches ==
Coach	Years
Maureen Alleyne	1979
Anna Shepherd	1987, 1999, 2006
Veneisha Cadogan	1995
Harriet Waithe	2003–2008
Alwyn Babb	2010, 2011
Anna Shepherd	2014, 2015
Sandra Bruce-Small	2018, 2019
Margaret Cutting	2019–2023
Denise Alleyne	2023–2025

== Honours ==
- West Indies, Caribbean, AFNA Championships
  - Winners: 1992, 1993
  - Runners Up: 1984, 1997, 1998, 2004, 2006, 2012, 2014, 2018
- Netball World Cup Qualifiers
  - Runners Up: 2006, 2010, 2014, 2018
