= Maleta Roberts =

Papua New Guinean netball player (born 1985)

Personal information
- Born: 25 April 1985 (age 41) Arawa, Papua New Guinea
- Height: 1.78 m (5 ft 10 in)
- Spouse: Scott Meehan

Netball career
- Playing positions: GA, GS
Years	Club team	Apps
2006–07	Queensland Firebirds	
Years	National team	Caps
2007–present	Papua New Guinea	
- Updated on 8 October 2010

Maleta Roberts (born 25 April 1985) is a Papua New Guinean international netball player. Roberts was a member of the Papua New Guinea national team that played in the 2007 Arafura Games and the 2007 Netball World Championships, and subsequently at the 2010 Commonwealth Games. In 2013 she was appointed Co-Captain of the PNG Pepes for the Pacific Series in Samoa. She also played with the Queensland Firebirds in Australia's Commonwealth Bank Trophy, and played with the Queensland Fusion in the inaugural Australian Netball League. At State League level, Roberts played in the Holden Astra Cup (Tier 1) and was Co-Captain of Suncoast Lynx and later played for the Gold Coast Jaguars. Appointed Co-Captain of PNG Pepes in 2013 for successful Pacific Series in Samoa and later in year the 6 Nations Tournament in Singapore. Since 2013 Roberts has been living, playing and coaching netball in Bendigo, Victoria. She has now moved to Brisbane Australia in 2020.
