= Saint Kitts and Nevis national netball team =

National netball team

Saint Kitts and Nevis
- Nickname(s): Queens
- Association: St Kitts and Nevis Netball Association
- Confederation: Americas Netball
- Captain: Rochella Challenger
- World ranking: 37th
Team colours

Netball World Cup
- Appearances: 1 (Debuted in 1979)
- 1979 placing: 8th
- Best result: 16th (1979)

The Saint Kitts and Nevis national netball team represents the St Kitts and Nevis Netball Association in international netball tournaments. The team has been active since the late 1950s. In 1973 and 1978, St Kitts and Nevis won the West Indies Netball Championship. They also featured at the 1979 World Netball Tournament. More recently they have played in the ECCB International Netball Series. As of 1 June 2026, Saint Kitts and Nevis are listed 37th on the World Netball Rankings.

== Tournament history ==
=== Major tournaments ===
==== Netball World Cup ====
Tournaments	Place
1979 World Netball Tournament	8th

=== Americas tournaments ===
==== West Indies, Caribbean, AFNA Championships ====
The Saint Kitts and Nevis team has been active since the late 1950s when a team from Montserrat visited. In 1965, the Saint Kitts Netball Association became affiliated to the West Indies Netball Board and, in the same year, they made their tournament debut at the West Indies Netball Championship. In 1973 St Kitts and Nevis won the West Indies title for the first time. In the crucial match they defeated Trinidad and Tobago 31–28. In 1978, St Kitts and Nevis were champions again. In 1980, Saint Kitts hosted the now Caribbean Netball Championships and finished third. At several Caribbean Netball Championships, Saint Kitts and Nevis were represented by two separate teams.

Tournaments	Place
1965 West Indies Netball Championship	
1972 West Indies Netball Championship	2nd
1973 West Indies Netball Championship	1st
1978 Caribbean Netball Championships	1st
1980 Caribbean Netball Championships	3rd
1997 AFNA Championship	7th
2006 AFNA Championships	6th ^{1}

Notes

- ^1 The 2006 AFNA Championships also counted as a 2007 World Netball Championships Qualifier.

==== ECCB International Netball Series ====
Tournaments	Place
2022 ECCB International Netball Series	5th
2023 ECCB International Netball Series	5th

== Notable players ==
=== 2026 squad ===
Saint Kitts and Nevis national netball team roster
Players
Coaches

Name	Pos	DOB	Height	Club	Nat	Caps
Tashieca Bowen			–
Dianna Brown			–
Kalique Challenger			–
Rochella Challenger (c)			–
Tamiqua Douglas			–
Aaliyah Gibson			–
Sasha Liburd			–
Keirish Richardson			–
Shenneth Skeete			–
Natalie Sutton			–
Jewel Thompson			–
Tarren Tweed			–
Kadeena White			–
Shantel Williams			–
Kyla Winston			–

Head coach

- ??

Notes

- (c) – Captain
- (cc) – Co-captain
- (vc) – Vice-captain
- – Injury / maternity leave
- (TRP) – Temporary Replacement Player

=== Captains ===
Captains	Years
Hilary Francis	1973
Rosemary McMaster	1979
Rochella Challenger	

=== Head coaches ===
Coach	Years
Earle Clarke	1973
Delores Hobson	1973
