= 2022 ECCB International Netball Series =

International netball series hosted by Dominica

Tournament details
- Host country: Dominica
- City: Roseau
- Venue: Windsor Park
- Dates: 12–18 February 2022
- Teams: 5
- TV partner: YouTube

Final positions
- Champions: Saint Vincent and the Grenadines (1st title)
- Runners-up: Saint Lucia
- Third place: Antigua and Barbuda

Tournament statistics
- Matches played: 15
- Top scorer(s): Mary-Ann Frederick; Saint Vincent and the Grenadines; 221/268 (82%)

The 2022 ECCB International Netball Series, also known as the 2022 OECS International Netball Series, was the second ECCB International Netball Series. It was organised by the Caribbean Netball Association. Four national netball teams/Eastern Caribbean Central Bank members, including the hosts, Dominica, played a series of netball test matches in February 2022 at Roseau's Windsor Park. They were also joined by guest team Barbados. Barbados effectively won the overall series after winning all five of their matches. However, as they were not an ECCB member, they were ineligible to compete for the Gloria Ballantyne Championship Trophy. Saint Vincent and the Grenadines, who won four of their five matches, were subsequently declared winners. The series was streamed live on the ECCB's YouTube channel.

== Teams, head coaches and captains ==
Team	Head coach	Captain
Antigua and Barbuda		
Barbados		
Dominica		
Saint Kitts and Nevis		
Saint Lucia		
Saint Vincent and the Grenadines	O'Neil Cockburn	Vasha Adam

== Match officials ==
Umpires

Umpire	Association
Wayne Benti	Saint Lucia
Joel Brown	Trinidad and Tobago
Moeth Gaymes	St Vincent and the Grenadines
Kanika Paul-Payne	Trinidad and Tobago
Terrence Peart	Jamaica
Lilia Mathurin-Cameron	Trinidad and Tobago
Joel Young-Strong	Trinidad and Tobago

Umpire Appointments Panel

Umpire	Association
Yvette Smith	Jamaica
Deborah Lynch Theobalds	Barbados

== Matches ==
=== Day 1 ===
Sunday, 13 February 2022	Dominica	24–53	Antigua and Barbuda
18:00	Lisa James 17/25 (68%); Kyla Winston 6/10 (60%); Melissa Williams 1/4 (25%)		Reyana Regis 46/57 (81%); Amey Luke 7/10 (70%)

Sunday, 13 February 2022	Saint Vincent and the Grenadines	62–33	Saint Kitts and Nevis
18:30	Mary-Anne Frederick 52/60 (87%); Shellisa Davis 10/16 (63%)		Rochella Challenger 23/25 (92%); Aaliyah Gordon 9/19 (47%)

Sunday, 13 February 2022	Barbados	^{(Note 1)}	Saint Lucia
19:30

=== Day 2 ===
Monday, 14 February 2022	Dominica	23–74	Saint Vincent and the Grenadines
18:00	Lisa James 16/19 (84%); Kyla Winston 6/15 (40%); Melissa Williams 1/2 (50%)		Mary-Anne Frederick 58/64 (91%); Shellisa Davis 7/11 (64%); Joseann Antoine 6/9 (67%); Zannelle James 3/9 (33%)

Monday, 14 February 2022	Saint Lucia	50–27	Antigua and Barbuda
18:30	Roxanne Snyder 24/38 (63%); Megan Nestor 16/29 (55%); Shem Maxwell 10/11 (91%)		Reyana Regis 25/33 (76%); Amey Luke 2/9 (22%)

Monday, 14 February 2022	Barbados	57–34	Saint Kitts and Nevis
19:30	Faye Agard 29/35 (83%); Brianna Holder 20/27 (74%); Latonia Blackman 8/8 (100%)		Rochella Challenger 20/24 (83%); Aaliyah Gibson 14/25 (56%)

=== Day 3 ===
Tuesday, 15 February 2022	Barbados	41–35^{1}	Saint Lucia
7:00	Faye Agard 28/35 (80%); Brianna Holder 13/20 (65%)		Roxanne Snyder 15/18 (83%); Megan Nestor 11/19 (58%); Shem Maxwell 9/11 (82%)

Tuesday, 15 February 2022	Saint Vincent and the Grenadines	^{(Note 2)}	Antigua and Barbuda
18:00

Tuesday, 15 February 2022	Saint Lucia	^{(Note 2)}	Saint Kitts and Nevis
18:30

Tuesday, 15 February 2022	Dominica	^{(Note 2)}	Barbados
19:30

=== Day 4 ===
Wednesday, 16 February 2022	Saint Lucia	48–27	Saint Kitts and Nevis
	Roxanne Snyder 24/32 (75%); Shem Maxwell 22/31 (71%); Megan Nestor 2/10 (20%)		Aaliyah Gibson 24/32 (75%); Rochella Challenger 9/16 (56%); Jewel Thompson 6/8 (75%)

Wednesday, 16 February 2022	Barbados	48–31	Antigua and Barbuda
	Latonia Blackman 18/21 (86%); Faye Agard 13/19 (68%); Brianna Holder 12/21 (57%); Jada Smith 5/9 (56%)

Wednesday, 16 February 2022	Saint Vincent and the Grenadines	47–33	Antigua and Barbuda
	Mary-Anne Frederick 40/48 (83%); Shellisa Davis 7/17 (41%)		Reyana Regis 24/28 (86%); Amey Luke 9/15 (60%)

Wednesday, 16 February 2022	Dominica	27–67	Barbados
19:00	Celena Langlais 18/21 (86%); Kyla Winston 6/18 (33%); Lisa James 1/1 (100%)		Latonia Blackman 26/29 (90%); Faye Agard 22/26 (85%); Jada Smith 19/31 (61%)

=== Day 5 ===
Thursday, 17 February 2022	Antigua and Barbuda	45–42	Saint Kitts and Nevis
18:00	Reyana Regis 37/50 (74%); Amey Luke 8/10 (80%)		Aaliyah Gisbon 28/39 (72%); Rochella Challenger 14/16 (88%)

Thursday, 17 February 2022	Barbados	48–42	Saint Vincent and the Grenadines
18:30	Faye Agard 23/29 (79%); Latonia Blackman 16/24 (67%); Brianna Holder 9/12 (75%)		Mary-Anne Frederick 39/48 (81%); Shellisa Davis 3/16 (19%)

Thursday, 17 February 2022	Dominica	26–43	Saint Lucia
19:30	Celena Langlais 18/22 (82%); Kyla Winston 7/11 (64%); Lisa James 1/5 (20%)		Roxanne Snyder 29/38 (76%); Safiya Paul 11/18 (61%); Megan Nestor 3/6 (50%)

=== Day 6 ===
Friday, 18 February 2022	Dominica	68–46	Saint Kitts and Nevis
18:00	Galeine Serephine 44/53 (83%); Anna Xavier Panthier 24/32 (75%)		Aaliyah Gordon 24/32 (75%); Rochella Challenger 18/21 (86%); Jewel Thompson 4/5 (80%)

Friday, 18 February 2022	Saint Vincent and the Grenadines	39–17^{3}	Saint Lucia
18:30	Mary-Anne Frederick 32/48 (67%); Shellisa Davis 5/9 (56%); Zanique Vincent 2/5 (40%)		Roxanne Snyder 11/13 (85%); Aailyah Estephor 4/8 (50%); Safiya Paul 2/4 (50%)

Notes

- ^1 On Day 1, the match between Barbados and Saint Lucia was cancelled due to rain. It was rescheduled and successfully played on Day 3.
- ^2 The three Day 3 evening matches were cancelled due to rain. They were rescheduled and played on Day 4.
- ^3 Saint Vincent and the Grenadines were leading Saint Lucia 39–17 at the end of the 3rd quarter when rain brought a premature end to the match. A decision was then made to cancel the 4th quarter to avoid the risk of injuries to the players due to the slippery court. Saint Vincent and the Grenadines were declared the winners.

== Final table ==
Pos	Team	P	W	L	D	GF	GA	GD	Pts
	Barbados	5	5	0	0	261	169	+92	25
1	Saint Vincent and the Grenadines	5	4	1	0	264	154	+110	21
2	Saint Lucia	5	3	2	0	193	160	+33	16
3	Antigua and Barbuda	5	2	3	0	189	211	-22	13
4	Dominica	5	1	4	0	168	283	-115	6
5	Saint Kitts and Nevis	5	0	5	0	182	280	-98	6

Barbados were a guest team and did not compete for the Gloria Ballantyne Championship Trophy

Notes

- ^4 Reports indicate that the series used a 5-points for a win system.

== Award winners ==
=== Overall series ===
Award	Winner	Team
Gloria Ballantyne Championship Trophy	Saint Vincent and the Grenadines	
Player of the Tournament	Shania Pompey	Saint Vincent and the Grenadines
Most Goals	Mary–Ann Frederick 221/268 (82%)	Saint Vincent and the Grenadines
Most Accurate Shooter	Latonia Blackman	Barbados
Best Defending Player	Joseann Antoine	Saint Vincent and the Grenadines
Best Centre Court Player	Shania Pompey	Saint Vincent and the Grenadines
Best Team on Parade	Dominica	
Most Disciplined Team	Barbados	
Best Shooting Team	Saint Vincent and the Grenadines	
Best Defending Team	Saint Lucia	

=== Teams' Individual MVPs ===
Winner	Team
Rayana Regis	Antigua and Barbuda
Shonette Azore-Bruce	Barbados
Makerah George	Dominica
Rochella Challenger	Saint Kitts and Nevis
Makeba Alcide	Saint Lucia
Shania Pompey	Saint Vincent and the Grenadines
