= 2012 AFNA Championships =

International netball series hosted by Trinidad and Tobago

Tournament details
- Host country: Trinidad and Tobago
- City: Port of Spain
- Venue: Jean Pierre Sports Complex
- Dates: 14–21 July 2012
- Teams: 9

Final positions
- Champions: Jamaica (11th title)
- Runners-up: Barbados
- Third place: Trinidad and Tobago

Tournament statistics
- Matches played: 36

The 2012 AFNA Championships was a series organised by the Americas Federation of Netball Associations. It featured nine teams playing a series of netball test matches in July 2012 at Port of Spain's Jean Pierre Sports Complex. The hosts, Trinidad and Tobago, were joined by eight other national netball teams. Teams used the series to qualify for the 2014 Commonwealth Games and to gain INF World Rankings points. Jamaica and Barbados eventually finished as winners and runners up. It was Jamaica's 11th regional title. Jamaica's Anna Kay Griffiths was named the MVP of the series.

== Teams, head coaches and captains ==
Team	Head coach	Captain
Barbados		
Bermuda	Anthony Mouchette	Karen Jones-Simmons
Canada	Ann Willcocks ?	
Grenada		
Guyana	Lavern Fraser-Thomas	Adel Chalmers
Jamaica	Oberon Pitterson	Nadine Bryan
Saint Lucia	Connie Francis	
Trinidad and Tobago	Jennifer Frank	Anika La Roche
United States		

== Matches ==
=== Day 1 ===
Saturday, 14 July 2012	Trinidad and Tobago	104–10	Guyana	Court 1
17:30	Anastascia Wilson 88/99 (89%); Joelisa Cooper 11/12 (92%); Janelle Barker 5/8 (63%)		Angeline McCarthy ??

Saturday, 14 July 2012	United States	41–37	Grenada	Court 2
17:45	Swasha Sawh 19/26 (73%); Justine Telson 9/9 (100%); Camille Henry 9/14 (64%); Roenish Davis Francis 4/9 (44%)

Saturday, 14 July 2012	Barbados	104–13	Bermuda	Court 3
18:00	Laurel Browne 54/59 (92%); Nikita Piggott 34/44 (77%); Shonica Wharton 14/17 (82%)		Danielle Raynor 6/7 (86%); Marisa Wainwright 5/7 (71%); Kimale Evans 2/2 (100%); Ebonie Burgess 0/2 (0%)

Saturday, 14 July 2012	Jamaica	72–31	Saint Lucia	Court 1
18:45	Jhaniele Fowler 63/69 (91%); Anna Kay Griffiths 5/8 (63%); Vanessa Walker 4/7 (57%)		Shem Maxwell 15/21 (71%); Merlissa Alfred 13/15 (87%); Indira Laurenain 3/3 (100%)

=== Day 2 ===
Sunday, 15 July 2012	Saint Lucia	85–17	Guyana	Court 1
16:00

Sunday, 15 July 2012	Barbados	52–21	United States	Court 2
16:15

Sunday, 15 July 2012	Jamaica	107–13	Grenada	Court 1
17:15	Jhaniele Fowler 47/51 (92%); Shantal Slater 33/37 (89%) ?? 27

Sunday, 15 July 2012	Trinidad and Tobago	55–28	Canada	Court 3
19.30	Anastascia Wilson 39/45 (87%); Joelisa Cooper 16/18 (89%)		Sherry Ann Nickie 17/23 (74%); Sabrina Versteeg 11/19 (58%)

=== Day 3 ===
Monday, 16 July 2012	Jamaica	124–8	Guyana	Court 1
17:00	Shantal Slater 71/75 (95%); Jhaniele Fowler 30/31 (97%); Vanessa Walker 16/19 (84%); Anna Kay Griffiths 7/8 (88%)		Angeline Mc Carthy 8/12 (67%)

Monday, 16 July 2012	Barbados	60–29	Canada
	Laurel Browne 39/42 (93%); Nikita Piggott 21/22 (95%)		Sherry Ann Nickie 20/27 (74%); Sabrina Versteeg 5/12 (42%); Kelsy Binns 4/7 (57%)

Monday, 16 July 2012	Saint Lucia	47–36	United States	Court 3
17:45	Indira Laurencin 29/31 (94%); Shem Maxwell 18/24 (75%)		Swasha Sawh 18/20 (90%); Camille Henry 15/19 (79%); Roniesh Davis-Francis 3/5 (60%)

Monday, 16 July 2012	Trinidad and Tobago	95–18	Bermuda	Court 1
18:15	Anastascia Wilson 59/64 (92%); Jellene Richardson 32/34 (94%); Rhonda John-Davis 4/4 (100%)		Danielle Raynor 12/14 (86%); Ebonie Burgess 3/4 (75%); Kimale Evans 3/3 (100%)

=== Day 4 ===
Tuesday, 17 July 2012	United States	64–28	Bermuda	Court 1
17:30

Tuesday, 17 July 2012	Barbados	112–13	Guyana	Court 2
17:45	Laurel Browne 47/50 (94%); Shonica Wharton 35/40 (88%); Nikita Piggott 19/20 (95%)	Report

Tuesday, 17 July 2012	Trinidad and Tobago	78–29	Grenada	Court 3
18:00	Anastascia Wilson 48/53 (91%); Joelisa Cooper 13/13 (100%); Jellene Richardson 13/15 (87%)		Sharon Jeremiah 20/28 (71%)

Tuesday, 17 July 2012	Jamaica	79–19	Canada	Court 1
18:30	Jhaniele Fowler 50/53 (94%); Shantal Slater 13/14 (93%)		Cherry Nickie 13/17 (76%)

=== Day 5 ===
Wednesday, 18 July 2012	Saint Lucia	68–26	Bermuda	Court 1
09:00

Wednesday, 18 July 2012	United States	82–25	Guyana	Court 1
17:30	Camille Henry 35/37 (95%); Swasha Sawh 39/50 (78%) ?? 8		Angeline McCarthy 18/27 (67%); Simonica Fanfair 7/11 (64%)

Wednesday, 18 July 2012	Barbados	90–19	Grenada	Court 2
17:45	Nikita Piggott 44/53 (83%); Laurel Browne 41/43 (95%) ?? 5

Wednesday, 18 July 2012	Canada	49–31	Bermuda	Court 3
18:00

Wednesday, 18 July 2012	Trinidad and Tobago	63–28	Saint Lucia	Court 1
18:30	Anastascia Wilson 34/39 (87%); Jellene Richardson 29/32 (91%)

=== Day 6 ===
Thursday, 19 July 2012	Canada	41–31	Grenada	Court 1
09:30

Thursday, 19 July 2012	Jamaica	65–37	Barbados	Court 1
17:00

Thursday, 19 July 2012	Trinidad and Tobago	60–23	United States	Court 2
17:30	Anastascia Wilson 18/21 (86%); Joelisa Cooper 15/15 (100%); Janelle Barker 14; Jellene Richardson 13		Camille Henry 9/14 (64%); Dailian McArthur 7/10 (70%); Roneish Davis 6/10 (60%) ?? 1

Thursday, 19 July 2012	Grenada	60–45	Bermuda	Court 3
17:45

Thursday, 19 July 2012	Saint Lucia	57–41	Canada	Court 1
18:15

=== Day 7 ===
Friday, 20 July 2012	Jamaica	94–15	Bermuda
	Shantal Slater 78/85 (92%); Vanessa Walker 10/14 (71%) ?? 6

Friday, 20 July 2012	Jamaica	87–19	United States	Court 1
17:00	Jhaniele Fowler 36/40 (90%); Shantal Slater 27/29 (93%); Anna Kay Griffiths 21/23 (91%); Vanessa Walker 3/5 (60%)

Friday, 20 July 2012	Trinidad and Tobago	48–59	Barbados	Court 2
17:30	Anastascia Wilson 31/38 (82%); Janelle Barker 13/14 (93%); Joelisa Cooper 6/7 (86%)		Laurel Browne 38/40 (95%); Nikita Piggott 21/24 (88%)

Friday, 20 July 2012	Saint Lucia	58–36	Grenada	Court 3
17:45	Indira Laurencin 36/40 (90%); Melissa Alfred 12/19 (63%); Shem Maxwell 10/13 (77%)		Christa Stephen 22/26 (85%); Cecile Roberts 14/22 (64%)

Friday, 20 July 2012	Canada	70–23	Guyana	Court 1
18:15	Sherry Ann Nickie 53/62 (85%); Sabrina Versteeg 10/17 (59%); Kelsey Binns 7/15 (47%)		Angeline McCarthy 18/27 (67%); Simona Fanfair 5/6 (83%)

=== Day 8 ===
Saturday, 21 July 2012	Grenada	63–24	Guyana	Court 1
09:30	Christa Stephen 46/51 (90%) ?? 17	Report	Angeline McCarthy 18/25 (72%); Simona Fanfair 6/11 (55%); Shonette Estwick 0/3 (0%)

Saturday, 21 July 2012	Barbados	54–28	Saint Lucia	Court 1
17:00	Nikita Piggott 31/35 (89%); Laurel Browne 20/27 (74%); Shonica Wharton 3/5 (60%)		Shem Maxwell 19/27 (70%); Indira Laurencin 7/8 (88%); Joanne Anderson 1/3 (33%); Glatta Gabriel 1/1 (100%)

Saturday, 21 July 2012	Canada	59–41	United States	Court 2
17:30	Sherry Ann Nickie 46/54 (85%); Sabrina Versteeg 13/19 (68%)		Camille Henry 21/25 (84%); Swasha Sawh 16/20 (80%); Natalie Hosang 3/3 (100%); Tasha Brown 1/1 (100%)

Saturday, 21 July 2012	Bermuda	68–34	Guyana	Court 3
18:00	Danielle Raynor 57/63 (90%); Marisa Wainwright 11/16 (69%)	Report	Angeline McCarthy 31/42 (74%); Adele Chalmers 2/2 (100%); Renee Anderson 1/2 (50%)

Saturday, 21 July 2012	Trinidad and Tobago	40–60	Jamaica	Court 1
18:30	Joelisa Cooper 15/22 (68%); Anastascia Wilson 11/15 (73%); Janelle Barker 14/20 (70%)		Jhaniele Fowler 40/44 (91%); Anna Kay Griffiths 20/25 (80%)

== Final table ==
Pos	Team	P	W	L	D	GF	GA	GD	Pts
1	Jamaica	8	8	0	0	688	182	+506	16
2	Barbados	8	7	1	0	567	256	+311	14
3	Trinidad and Tobago	8	6	2	0	543	255	+288	12
4	Saint Lucia	8	5	3	0	402	345	+57	10
5	Canada	8	4	4	0	336	377	-41	8
6	United States	8	3	5	0	328	395	-67	6
7	Grenada	8	2	6	0	288	484	-196	4
8	Bermuda	8	1	7	0	263	567	-304	2
9	Guyana	8	0	8	0	154	708	-554	0

Invited to the 2014 Commonwealth Games

== Top three squads ==
Winners	Runners Up	Third
Jamaica; Coach: Oberon Pitterson	Barbados; Coach:	Trinidad and Tobago; Coach: Jennifer Frank
Nadine Bryan (c); Kasey Evering; Jhaniele Fowler; Anna-Kay Griffiths; Malysha Kelly; Sasha-Gay Lynch; Patricia McCalla; Shamera Sterling; Shantel Slater; Kimmone Tulloch; Vanessa Walker; Vangelee Williams		Janelle Barker; Joelisa Cooper; Rhonda John-Davis; Crystal Ann George; Candice Guerero; Onella Jack; Anika La Roche (c); Alicia Liverpool; Tricia Liverpool; Kemfa Phillip; Jellene Richarsdson; Anastascia Wilson
