= Dominican Republic national netball team =

National netball team

Dominican Republic
- Association: Netball Republica Dominicana
- Confederation: Americas Netball
- World ranking: n/a
darkblue

The Dominican Republic national netball team represents Netball Republica Dominicana in international netball tournaments such as the Netball at the Central American and Caribbean Games. As of 1 June 2026, the Dominican Republic are not listed on the World Netball Rankings.

== Tournament history ==
=== Americas tournaments ===
==== Central American and Caribbean Games ====
| Tournaments | Place |
|---|---|
| 2023 Central American and Caribbean Games | 6th |
| 2026 Central American and Caribbean Games | 6th |
