= Netball at the 2026 Central American and Caribbean Games =

International netball tournament hosted by the Dominican Republic

Tournament details
- Host country: Dominican Republic
- City: Santo Domingo Este
- Venue: Ciudad Juan Bosch Sports Center
- Dates: 2–6 August 2026
- Teams: 6

Final positions
- Champions: Trinidad and Tobago (1st title)
- Runners-up: Jamaica
- Third place: Saint Lucia

Tournament statistics
- Matches played: 15

The Netball at the 2026 Central American and Caribbean Games was the second netball tournament at the Central American and Caribbean Games. The tournament featured Barbados, Bermuda, Jamaica, Saint Lucia, Trinidad and Tobago and the hosts, the Dominican Republic, playing each other in a series of netball test matches in August 2026. They were played at the Ciudad Juan Bosch Sports Center in Santo Domingo Este. Bermuda and Saint Lucia were making their CAC netball tournament debut. In addition to the hosts, the tournament featured the five best countries in the region, according to the World Netball Rankings.

With a team coached by Liselle Johnson, captained by Kalifa McCollin and featuring Samantha Wallace, Trinidad and Tobago finished the tournament as gold medallists after winning all five of their matches. In their final match they defeated Jamaica 56–49. It was the first time Trinidad and Tobago had defeated Jamaica since 1998. Saint Lucia finished as bronze medallists after defeating Barbados 45–41 in their final match. This was the first time Saint Lucia had defeated Barbados since 2010.

== Squads ==
Participating teams and rosters
Barbados	Bermuda	Dominican Republic	Jamaica	Saint Lucia	Trinidad and Tobago
Faye Agard; Azaria Alleyne; Salisha Auguste; Shonette Azore-Bruce; Damisha Croney (c); Trishan Deane; Trinity Gibson; Brianna Holder; Kijana Johnson; Stephian Shepherd; Jada Smith; Akeena Stoute	Asante Chapman; Debré Evans (c); Keizhari Knight; Kaylee Leema; Kianté Lightbourne (vc); Jordyn Ming; Brianna Ray; Jasmyn Renfroe; Inshan-Nae Smith; Jahkenya Trott; Jahtuere Trott; Selah Tuzo		Tori Akinrinlola; Jessica Chaplain; Deandra Edwards (vc); Zaudi Green; Simone Gordon; Shaqwan Hamilton (cc); Kellian Hunter; Tamera Jarrett; Tianna Reid; Jada Ricketts; Kimone Shaw (cc); Corneilia Walters	Neriah Charlery; Melika Destang (c); Lizzy Dorvius; Aaliyah Estephor; Dasha Eugene; Naija Ferdinand; Lerkisha Felix; Jermia Martial; Kiana Nelson; Megan Nestor; Roxanne Snyder; Patrina Wilson	Rehanna Ali; Maikea Bramble; Rayann Bristol; Tia Bruno; Kielle Connelly; Nekeisha Gomes; Shaquanda Greene; Kalifa McCollin (c); Nicolette Osborne; Kira Rothwell; Shantel Seemungal; Samantha Wallace
Head Coach:	Head Coach: Kimale Evans	Head Coach:	Head Coach: Nardia Hanson	Head Coach: Shem Maxwell	Head Coach: Liselle Johnson

== Match officials ==
Umpires

Umpire	Association
Wayne Benti	Saint Lucia
Sheldon Bent	Jamaica
Makeba Clarke	Grenada
Moeth Gaymes	St Vincent and the Grenadines
Michelle Maynard	Barbados
Kanika Paul-Payne	Trinidad and Tobago
Terrence Peart	Jamaica

Umpire Appointments Panel

Umpire	Association
Deborah Lynch	Barbados
Joel Young-Strong	Trinidad and Tobago

== Matches ==
=== Round 1 ===
Sunday, 2 August 2026	Trinidad and Tobago	52–25	Saint Lucia
		Stats

Sunday, 2 August 2026	Barbados	57–25	Bermuda
			Keizhari Knight 14/17 (82%); Selah Tuzo 10/13 (77%); Terita Moira 1

Sunday, 2 August 2026	Dominican Republic	12–67	Jamaica
			Kellian Hunter 27/34 (79%); Jada Ricketts 18/21 (86%); Tamera Jarrett 7/8 (88%) ?? 15

=== Round 2 ===
Monday, 3 August 2026	Dominican Republic	22–49	Saint Lucia
			Dasha Eugene 23/29 (79%); Neriah Charlery 20/23 (87%); Roxanne Snyder 6/7 (86%)

Monday, 3 August 2026	Jamaica	79–19	Bermuda
	Simone Gordon 35/47 (74%); Kellian Hunter 25/32 (78%); Tamera Jarrett 10/11 (91%); Jada Ricketts 9/13 (69%)

Monday, 3 August 2026	Trinidad and Tobago	61–39	Barbados
	Samantha Wallace 36/38 (95%); Maikea Bramble 14/15 (93%); Kalifa McCollin 10/12 (83%); Kira Rothwell 1/2 (50%)		Faye Agard 20/24 (83%); Brianna Holder 15/20 (75%); Jada Smith 4/5 (80%)

=== Round 3 ===
Tuesday, 4 August 2026	Dominican Republic	6–86	Trinidad and Tobago
16.00		Stats

Tuesday, 4 August 2026	Saint Lucia	44–29	Bermuda
	Dasha Eugene 22/31 (71%); Neriah Charlery 15/18 (83%); Melika Destang 7/10 (70%)

Tuesday, 4 August 2026	Jamaica	46–37	Barbados
	Simone Gordon 29/41 (71%); Jada Ricketts 13/22 (59%) ?? 4

=== Round 4 ===
Wednesday, 5 August 2026	Trinidad and Tobago	76–28	Bermuda
		Stats

Wednesday, 5 August 2026	Dominican Republic	17–78	Barbados

Wednesday, 5 August 2026	Jamaica	40–25	Saint Lucia

=== Round 5 ===
Thursday, 6 August 2026	Dominican Republic	35–36	Bermuda
			JahTuere Trott 18/23 (78%); Jahkenya Trott 13/21 (62%); Inshan-nae Smith 3 Jasmyn Renfroe 1 Selah Tuzo 1

Thursday, 6 August 2026	Saint Lucia	45–41	Barbados
	Melika Destang 15/18 (83%); Dasha Eugene 14; Neriah Charlery 12/14 (86%) ?? 4	Report	Faye Agard 18/24 (75%) ?? 23

Thursday, 6 August 2026	Trinidad and Tobago	56–49	Jamaica
	Samantha Wallace 41/44 (93%); Kalifa McCollin 15/15 (100%)		Simone Gordon 41/53 (77%); Jada Ricketts 8/17 (47%)

== Final table ==
Pos	Team	P	W	D	L	GF	GA	GD	Pts
1st place, gold medalist(s)	Trinidad and Tobago	5	5	0	0	331	147	+184	10
2nd place, silver medalist(s)	Jamaica	5	4	0	1	281	149	+132	8
3rd place, bronze medalist(s)	Saint Lucia	5	3	0	2	184	177	+7	6
4	Barbados	5	2	0	3	245	190	+55	4
5	Bermuda	5	1	0	4	137	291	-154	2
6	Dominican Republic	5	0	0	5	92	316	-224	0
