= Netball at the 2023 Central American and Caribbean Games =

International netball tournament hosted by El Salvador

Tournament details
- Host country: El Salvador
- City: San Salvador
- Venue: Gimnasio Nacional José Adolfo Pineda
- Dates: 3–7 July 2023
- Teams: 6

Final positions
- Champions: Jamaica (1st title)
- Runners-up: Trinidad and Tobago
- Third place: Saint Vincent and the Grenadines

Tournament statistics
- Matches played: 15

The Netball at the 2023 Central American and Caribbean Games was the inaugural netball tournament at the Central American and Caribbean Games. The Jamaica Olympic Association had campaigned for netball to be included and in November 2021 it was confirmed that it would feature at the 2023 Games, hosted by El Salvador. The tournament featured Barbados, the Cayman Islands, the Dominican Republic, Jamaica, Saint Vincent and the Grenadines and Trinidad and Tobago playing each other in a series of netball test matches in July 2023. With a team coached by Nicole Aiken-Pinnock and captained by Adean Thomas, Jamaica finished the tournament as gold medallists after winning all five of their matches. In their final match they defeated Trinidad and Tobago 50–36. Saint Vincent and the Grenadines finished as bronze medallists after defeating Barbados 51–50 in their final match.

== Squads ==
Participating teams and rosters
Barbados	Cayman Islands	Dominican Republic	Jamaica	Saint Vincent and the Grenadines	Trinidad and Tobago
Faye Agard; Kimani Archer; Latonia Blackman; Trishan Deane; Shonica Griffith; Brianna Holder; Victoria Monerville; Tonisha Rock-Yaw; Jada Smith; Sabreena Smith; Akeena Stoute; Tamara Trotman	Kathryn Corkish; Charlotte Dowell; Alexcina Fraser; Micah Leon; Shiyan McField; Naihma Ordones Miller; Shanti Singh; Di'Jhaney Valentine; Atira White; Leah White; Rose Wilson		Shadine Bartley; Theresa Beckford; Paul-Ann Burton; Simone Gordon; Abbeygail Linton; Amanda Pinkney; Crystal Plummer; Rebekah Robinson; Kimone Shaw; Abigale Sutherland; Adean Thomas (c); Quannia Walker	Joseann Antoine; Kimesha Antoine; Kaywanna Charles (c); Kristiana Christopher; Shellisa Davis; Mary-Ann Frederick; Kyila Miller; Shania Pompey; Jo Maria Quashie; Zanique Vincent; Ruthann Williams; Geziel Wilson	Alena Brooks; Tia Bruno; Joelisa Cooper; Tianna Dillon; Shaquanda Greene-Noel; Jameela McCarthy; Jeresia McEachrane; Shaniya Morgan; Afeisha Noel (cc); Jellene Richardson; Shantel Seemungal; Daystar Swift (cc); Jellene Richardson
Head Coach:	Head Coach: Lyneth Monteith	Head Coach:	Head Coach: Nicole Aiken-Pinnock	Head Coach: Vasha Adams	Head Coach: Joel Young-Strong

== Matches ==
=== Round 1 ===
3 July 2023	Saint Vincent and the Grenadines	78–21	Cayman Islands
	Mary-Ann Frederick 56/58 (97%); Kimesha Antoine 10/13 (77%); Kristiana Christopher 5/6 (83%); Shellisa Davis 2/3 (67%)	Report	Rose Wilson 19/27 (70%); Alexcina Fraser 1/5 (20%)

3 July 2023	Jamaica	62–25	Barbados

3 July 2023	Trinidad and Tobago	108–10	Dominican Republic

=== Round 2 ===
4 July 2023	Saint Vincent and the Grenadines	94–12	Dominican Republic

4 July 2023	Jamaica	116–10	Cayman Islands
	Amanda Pinkney 47/47 (100%); Simone Gordon 31/34 (91%); Rebekah Robinson 25/25 (100%)	Report

5 July 2023	Trinidad and Tobago	50–47	Barbados

Notes

- ^1 The match between Trinidad and Tobago and Barbados was rescheduled after a rainstorm caused leaks in the roof of the court.

=== Round 3 ===
5 July 2023	Trinidad and Tobago	60–30	Saint Vincent and the Grenadines
	Afeisha Noel 25/31 (81%); Joelisa Cooper 20/20 (100%); Tianna Dillon 11/17 (65%)		Mary-Ann Frederick 27/30 (90%); Kristiana Christopher 2/3 (67%); Shellisa Davis 1/2 (50%)

5 July 2023	Jamaica	110–7	Dominican Republic

5 July 2023	Barbados	78–21	Cayman Islands

=== Round 4 ===
6 July 2023	Barbados	98–12	Dominican Republic

6 July 2023	Trinidad and Tobago	90–12	Cayman Islands

6 July 2023	Jamaica	65–40	Saint Vincent and the Grenadines

=== Round 5 ===
7 July 2023	Cayman Islands	51–33	Dominican Republic
	Rose Wilson 40/52 (77%); Kathryn Corkish 11	Report

7 July 2023	Saint Vincent and the Grenadines	51–50	Barbados
	Mary-Ann Frederick 40/44 (91%); Shellisa Davis 11/16 (69%)	Report	Jada Smith 26/39 (67%); Latonia Blackman 24/29 (83%)

7 July 2023	Jamaica	50–36	Trinidad and Tobago
19:30	Simone Gordon 41/43 (95%); Rebekah Robinson 8/11 (73%)	Report

== Final table ==
Pos	Team	P	W	D	L	GF	GA	GD	Pts
1st place, gold medalist(s)	Jamaica	5	5	0	0	403	118	+285	10
2nd place, silver medalist(s)	Trinidad and Tobago	5	4	0	1	344	149	+195	8
3rd place, bronze medalist(s)	Saint Vincent and the Grenadines	5	3	0	2	293	208	+85	6
4	Barbados	5	2	0	3	298	196	-102	4
5	Cayman Islands	5	1	0	4	115	395	-280	2
6	Dominican Republic	5	0	0	5	74	461	-387	0
