= Amanda Knight (netball) =

Barbadian netball player

Personal information
- Born: 21 April 2000 (age 24)
- Height: 1.69 m (5 ft 6 1/2 in)
- Occupation: netball player

Netball career
- Playing position(s): wing attack, centre, wing defense

Amanda Knight (born 21 April 2000) is a Barbadian netball player who represents Barbados internationally and plays in the positions of wing attack, centre and wing defense. She made her maiden World Cup appearance representing Barbados at the 2019 Netball World Cup.
