= Rhe-Ann Niles-Mapp =

Barbadian netball player

Personal information
- Born: 14 June 1986 (age 38)
- Height: 1.73 m (5 ft 8 in)
- Occupation: netball player

Netball career
- Playing position(s): goal keeper, goal defense

Rhe-Ann Niles-Mapp also simply known as Rhe-Ann Niles (born 14 June 1986) is a Barbadian netball player who represents Barbados internationally and plays in the positions of goal keeper and goal defense. She competed at the Netball World Cup on three occasions in 2003, 2015 and 2019. She also represented Barbados at the Commonwealth Games in 2014 and in 2018.
