= Netball at the 2010 Commonwealth Games =

- Venue: Thyagaraj Sports Complex
- Location: Delhi, India
- Dates: 3 – 14 October 2010
- Nations: 12

Medalists
| gold medal | New Zealand |
| silver medal | Australia |
| bronze medal | England |

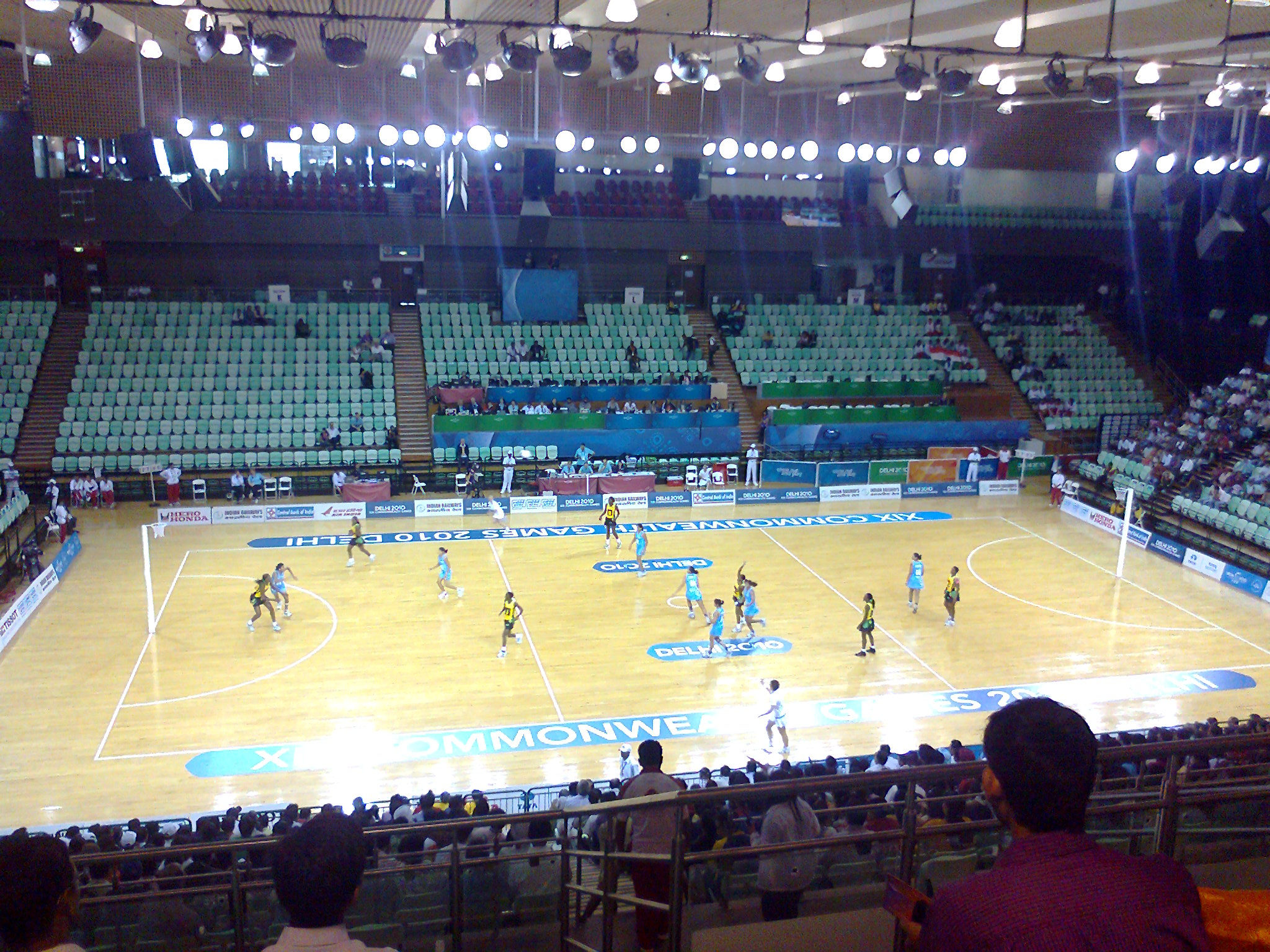
India vs Jamaica in netball at the 2010 Commonwealth Games

Netball at the 2010 Commonwealth Games was the fourth appearance of Netball at the Commonwealth Games. The sport was one of 17 sports that were contested at the 2010 Commonwealth Games in Delhi, India. Netball is a core sport for women at the Commonwealth Games, and one of only three events in the 2010 programme for women only (the other two are rhythmic gymnastics and synchronised swimming). The Commonwealth Games is one of the premier events in international netball. Matches were held between 4–14 October at the Thyagaraj Sports Complex.

Twelve participating nations were divided into two pools. After the preliminary matches, Australia and Jamaica progressed to the medal playoffs from Pool A, while New Zealand and England advanced from Pool B. The bronze medal for the event was won by England, who defeated Jamaica in the bronze medal playoff. The gold medal match was contested between Australia and New Zealand. After going into double extra-time, New Zealand won the gold medal, defeating Australia 66–64. The final went on for 84 minutes, the longest ever official game.

== Overview ==
=== Participating nations ===
Twelve nations competed in netball at the 2010 Commonwealth Games:

- India was included as the host nation for the Games;
- The top six teams from the IFNA World Rankings automatically qualified;
- The five remaining teams were selected through regional qualifying tournaments.

=== Format ===
The twelve participating nations are divided into two pools of six teams. Within each pool, teams play each other once in a round robin, at the end of which the top two teams from each pool progressed to the medal playoffs; the remaining teams competed in classification matches. In the first day of medal playoff matches, the top team from each pool played the second team from the opposing pool. The winners of these matches contested the gold medal match, while the losing teams contested the bronze medal match. The gold medal match was scheduled to be the last medal event at the 2010 Games.

=== Umpires ===
- Anne Abraitis (SCO)
- Rachael Ayre (AUS)
- Jonathan Bredin (NZL)
- Bobbi Brown (NZL)
- Gary Burgess (ENG)
- Sylvester Campbell (JAM)
- Paula Ferguson (AUS)
- Judith Groves (ENG)
- Dalton Hinds (JAM)
- Sharon Kelly (AUS)
- Annie Kloppers (RSA)
- Amanda Nottingham (NZL)
- Joel Young Strong (TRI)

=== Venue ===
All matches were held at the Thyagaraj Sports Complex in New Delhi. The newly built venue has a seating capacity of 4,494. The facility includes one maple-wood match court and two training courts.

== Preliminary round ==
=== Pool A ===
| Pos | Team | Pld | W | D | L | GF | GA | G% | Pts |
|---|---|---|---|---|---|---|---|---|---|
| 1 | Australia | 5 | 5 | 0 | 0 | 385 | 172 | 223.8 | 10 |
| 2 | Jamaica | 5 | 4 | 0 | 1 | 362 | 217 | 166.8 | 8 |
| 3 | Malawi | 5 | 3 | 0 | 2 | 293 | 262 | 111.8 | 6 |
| 4 | Trinidad and Tobago | 5 | 2 | 0 | 3 | 249 | 275 | 90.5 | 4 |
| 5 | Samoa | 5 | 1 | 0 | 4 | 246 | 291 | 84.5 | 2 |
| 6 | India | 5 | 0 | 0 | 5 | 123 | 441 | 27.9 | 0 |

- Goal percentage (G%) = 100 × GF/GA. Accurate to one decimal place.
- Highlighted teams advanced to the medal playoffs; other teams contested classification matches.

| Monday 4 October; 09:30 (IST) | Report | Australia | 76 – 39 | Samoa | Thyagaraj Sports Complex; Attendance: 58; Umpires: Amanda Nottingham, Sylvester Campbell; Reserve umpire: Anne Abraitis |
| Monday 4 October; 09:30 (IST) | Report | Cox 19/22 (86%); McMahon 15/17 (88%); Medhurst 17/17 (100%); Pratley 25/27 (93%) | | Faasavalu 13/24 (54%); Fuimaono 9/9 (100%); Langi 17/21 (81%) | Thyagaraj Sports Complex; Attendance: 58; Umpires: Amanda Nottingham, Sylvester Campbell; Reserve umpire: Anne Abraitis |

| Monday 4 October; 17:00 (IST) | Report | Jamaica | 75 – 36 | Trinidad and Tobago | Thyagaraj Sports Complex; Umpires: Judith Groves, Sharon Kelly; Reserve umpire: Bobbi Brown |
| Monday 4 October; 17:00 (IST) | Report | R. Aiken 37/43 (86%); Forbes 11/13 (85%); Fowler 20/23 (87%); Griffiths 7/11 (64%) | | Barker 3/3 (100%); Cooper 9/13 (69%); Wilson 24/30 (80%) | Thyagaraj Sports Complex; Umpires: Judith Groves, Sharon Kelly; Reserve umpire: Bobbi Brown |

| Tuesday 5 October; 11:30 (IST) | Report | Jamaica | 71 – 48 | Malawi | Thyagaraj Sports Complex; Umpires: Annie Kloppers, Joel Young Strong; Reserve umpire: Rachael Ayre |
| Tuesday 5 October; 11:30 (IST) | Report | R. Aiken 10/11 (91%); Forbes 9/10 (90%); Fowler 47/53 (89%); Griffiths 4/5 (80%) | | Kumwenda 31/38 (82%); Waya 17/23 (74%) | Thyagaraj Sports Complex; Umpires: Annie Kloppers, Joel Young Strong; Reserve umpire: Rachael Ayre |

| Tuesday 5 October; 17:00 (IST) | Report | Australia | 113 – 18 | India | Thyagaraj Sports Complex; Umpires: Jonathan Bredin, Dalton Hinds; Reserve umpire: Judith Groves |
| Tuesday 5 October; 17:00 (IST) | Report | Cox 27/28 (96%); McMahon 22/23 (96%); Medhurst 25/26 (96%); Pratley 39/42 (93%) | | H. Kaur 6/10 (60%); K. Kaur 7/8 (88%); Tehlan 5/5 (100%) | Thyagaraj Sports Complex; Umpires: Jonathan Bredin, Dalton Hinds; Reserve umpire: Judith Groves |

| Wednesday 6 October; 11:30 (IST) | Report | Malawi | 82 – 26 | India | Thyagaraj Sports Complex; Umpires: Gary Burgess, Bobbi Brown; Reserve umpire: Dalton Hinds |
| Wednesday 6 October; 11:30 (IST) | Report | Kumwenda 47/53 (89%); Magombo 12/15 (80%); Simtowe 6/7 (86%); Waya 17/21 (81%) | | Bajaj 4/4 (100%); H. Kaur 5/9 (56%); K. Kaur 17/19 (89%) | Thyagaraj Sports Complex; Umpires: Gary Burgess, Bobbi Brown; Reserve umpire: Dalton Hinds |

| Wednesday 6 October; 15:00 (IST) | Report | Samoa | 51 – 52 | Trinidad and Tobago | Thyagaraj Sports Complex; Umpires: Paula Ferguson, Amanda Nottingham; Reserve umpire: Rachael Ayre |
| Wednesday 6 October; 15:00 (IST) | Report | Faasavalu 9/14 (64%); Fuimaono 11/15 (73%); Langi 31/36 (86%) | | Cooper 26/29 (90%); Wilson 26/30 (87%) | Thyagaraj Sports Complex; Umpires: Paula Ferguson, Amanda Nottingham; Reserve umpire: Rachael Ayre |

| Thursday 7 October; 11:30 (IST) | Report | Trinidad and Tobago | 77 – 26 | India | Thyagaraj Sports Complex; Umpires: Anne Abraitis, Sylvester Campbell; Reserve umpire: Bobbi Brown |
| Thursday 7 October; 11:30 (IST) | Report | Barker 46/47 (98%); Cooper 16/18 (89%); Wallace 15/18 (83%) | | Bajaj 10/13 (77%); H. Kaur 6/8 (75%); K. Kaur 4/8 (50%); Tehlan 6/8 (75%) | Thyagaraj Sports Complex; Umpires: Anne Abraitis, Sylvester Campbell; Reserve umpire: Bobbi Brown |

| Thursday 7 October; 15:00 (IST) | Report | Australia | 60 – 46 | Jamaica | Thyagaraj Sports Complex; Umpires: Amanda Nottingham, Judith Groves; Reserve umpire: Jonathan Bredin |
| Thursday 7 October; 15:00 (IST) | Report | McMahon 26/30 (87%); Medhurst 34/35 (97%) | | R. Aiken 25/26 (96%); Forbes 12/17 (71%); Fowler 6/6 (100%); Griffiths 3/4 (75%) | Thyagaraj Sports Complex; Umpires: Amanda Nottingham, Judith Groves; Reserve umpire: Jonathan Bredin |

| Friday 8 October; 09:30 (IST) | Report | Samoa | 46 – 70 | Jamaica | Thyagaraj Sports Complex; Umpires: Rachael Ayre, Bobbi Brown; Reserve umpire: Gary Burgess |
| Friday 8 October; 09:30 (IST) | Report | Chang 4/6 (67%); Faasavalu 6/9 (67%); Langi 36/44 (82%) | | R. Aiken 50/54 (93%); Forbes 7/9 (78%); Fowler 13/15 (87%) | Thyagaraj Sports Complex; Umpires: Rachael Ayre, Bobbi Brown; Reserve umpire: Gary Burgess |

| Friday 8 October; 15:00 (IST) | Report | Malawi | 35 – 74 | Australia | Thyagaraj Sports Complex; Umpires: Annie Kloppers, Jonathan Bredin; Reserve umpire: Dalton Hinds |
| Friday 8 October; 15:00 (IST) | Report | Kumwenda 21/26 (81%); Simtowe 4/5 (80%); Waya 10/18 (56%) | | Cox 38/43 (88%); Pratley 36/39 (92%) | Thyagaraj Sports Complex; Umpires: Annie Kloppers, Jonathan Bredin; Reserve umpire: Dalton Hinds |

| Saturday 9 October; 11:30 (IST) | Report | Trinidad and Tobago | 50 – 61 | Malawi | Thyagaraj Sports Complex; Umpires: Amanda Nottingham, Gary Burgess; Reserve umpire: Annie Kloppers |
| Saturday 9 October; 11:30 (IST) | Report | Barker 7/7 (100%); Cooper 17/19 (89%); Wilson 26/30 (87%) | | Kumwenda 37/42 (88%); Waya 24/27 (89%) | Thyagaraj Sports Complex; Umpires: Amanda Nottingham, Gary Burgess; Reserve umpire: Annie Kloppers |

| Saturday 9 October; 17:00 (IST) | Report | India | 26 – 69 | Samoa | Thyagaraj Sports Complex; Umpires: Sharon Kelly, Rachael Ayre; Reserve umpire: Judith Groves |
| Saturday 9 October; 17:00 (IST) | Report | Chaudhary 3/6 (50%); H. Kaur 3/7 (43%); K. Kaur 14/19 (74%); Tehlan 6/9 (67%) | | Chang 14/16 (88%); Faasavalu 9/12 (75%); Fuimaono 25/29 (86%); Langi 21/24 (88%) | Thyagaraj Sports Complex; Umpires: Sharon Kelly, Rachael Ayre; Reserve umpire: Judith Groves |

| Sunday 10 October; 11:00 (IST) | Report | Jamaica | 100 – 27 | India | Thyagaraj Sports Complex; Umpires: Amanda Nottingham, Paula Ferguson; Reserve umpire: Rachael Ayre |
| Sunday 10 October; 11:00 (IST) | Report | R. Aiken 40/42 (95%); Forbes 13/14 (93%); Fowler 38/41 (93%); Griffiths 9/12 (75%) | | Chaudhary 0/1 (0%); H. Kaur 8/12 (67%); Tehlan 19/23 (83%) | Thyagaraj Sports Complex; Umpires: Amanda Nottingham, Paula Ferguson; Reserve umpire: Rachael Ayre |

| Sunday 10 October; 16:00 (IST) | Report | Malawi | 67 – 41 | Samoa | Thyagaraj Sports Complex; Umpires: Gary Burgess, Sylvester Campbell; Reserve umpire: Paula Ferguson |
| Sunday 10 October; 16:00 (IST) | Report | Kumwenda 52/55 (95%); Simtowe 4/5 (80%); Waya 11/13 (85%) | | Chang 4/6 (67%); Faasavalu 8/13 (62%); Fuimaono 17/19 (89%); Langi 12/14 (86%) | Thyagaraj Sports Complex; Umpires: Gary Burgess, Sylvester Campbell; Reserve umpire: Paula Ferguson |

| Sunday 10 October; 21:00 (IST) | Report | Australia | 62 – 34 | Trinidad and Tobago | Thyagaraj Sports Complex; Umpires: Annie Kloppers, Jonathan Bredin; Reserve umpire: Gary Burgess |
| Sunday 10 October; 21:00 (IST) | Report | Cox 15/22 (68%); McMahon 18/24 (75%); Medhurst 12/12 (100%); Pratley 17/21 (81%) | | Barker 16/17 (94%); Cooper 2/4 (50%); Wilson 16/22 (73%) | Thyagaraj Sports Complex; Umpires: Annie Kloppers, Jonathan Bredin; Reserve umpire: Gary Burgess |

=== Pool B ===
| Pos | Team | Pld | W | D | L | GF | GA | G% | Pts |
|---|---|---|---|---|---|---|---|---|---|
| 1 | New Zealand | 5 | 5 | 0 | 0 | 403 | 137 | 294.2 | 10 |
| 2 | England | 5 | 4 | 0 | 1 | 346 | 167 | 207.2 | 8 |
| 3 | South Africa | 5 | 3 | 0 | 2 | 257 | 253 | 101.6 | 6 |
| 4 | Barbados | 5 | 2 | 0 | 3 | 206 | 338 | 60.9 | 4 |
| 5 | Cook Islands | 5 | 1 | 0 | 4 | 203 | 359 | 56.5 | 2 |
| 6 | Papua New Guinea | 5 | 0 | 0 | 5 | 211 | 372 | 56.7 | 0 |

- Goal percentage (G%) = 100 × GF/GA. Accurate to one decimal place.
- Highlighted teams advanced to the medal playoffs; other teams contested classification matches.

| Monday 4 October; 11:30 (IST) | Report | Papua New Guinea | 21 – 102 | New Zealand | Thyagaraj Sports Complex; Umpires: Gary Burgess, Paula Ferguson; Reserve umpire: Joel Young Strong |
| Monday 4 October; 11:30 (IST) | Report | Roberts 7/12 (58%); Rikis 12/23 (52%); Baldwin 2/4 (50%) | | Van Dyk 33/35 (94%); Rasmussen 15/16 (94%); Tutaia 33/43 (77%); Wipiiti 21/29 (72%) | Thyagaraj Sports Complex; Umpires: Gary Burgess, Paula Ferguson; Reserve umpire: Joel Young Strong |

| Monday 4 October; 15:00 (IST) | Report | England | 81 – 20 | Barbados | Thyagaraj Sports Complex; Umpires: Dalton Hinds, Rachael Ayre; Reserve umpire: Jonathan Bredin |
| Monday 4 October; 15:00 (IST) | Report | Cookey 26/30 (87%); Harten 35/42 (83%); Brownfield 15/18 (83%); Dunn 5/9 (56%) | | Piggott 7/15 (47%); Browne 6/9 (67%); Bishop 5/7 (71%); Blackman 2/2 (100%) | Thyagaraj Sports Complex; Umpires: Dalton Hinds, Rachael Ayre; Reserve umpire: Jonathan Bredin |

| Tuesday 5 October; 09:30 (IST) | Report | South Africa | 36 – 54 | England | Thyagaraj Sports Complex; Umpires: Bobbi Brown, Sharon Kelly; Reserve umpire: Amanda Nottingham |
| Tuesday 5 October; 09:30 (IST) | Report | Bootha 13/22 (59%); Gumede 23/28 (82%) | | Brownfield 13/14 (93%); Cookey 14/17 (82%); Dunn 5/6 (83%); Harten 22/28 (79%) | Thyagaraj Sports Complex; Umpires: Bobbi Brown, Sharon Kelly; Reserve umpire: Amanda Nottingham |

| Tuesday 5 October; 15:00 (IST) | Report | New Zealand | 87 – 24 | Cook Islands | Thyagaraj Sports Complex; Umpires: Anne Abraitis, Sylvester Campbell; Reserve umpire: Gary Burgess |
| Tuesday 5 October; 15:00 (IST) | Report | Van Dyk 37/39 (95%); Tutaia 30/34 (88%); Rasmussen 6/8 (75%); Wipiiti 14/21 (67%) | | PK Te Huna 7/10 (70%); George 17/27 (63%) | Thyagaraj Sports Complex; Umpires: Anne Abraitis, Sylvester Campbell; Reserve umpire: Gary Burgess |

| Wednesday 6 October; 09:30 (IST) | Report | Cook Islands | 46 – 60 | Barbados | Thyagaraj Sports Complex; Umpires: Annie Kloppers, Anne Abraitis; Reserve umpire: Sylvester Campbell |
| Wednesday 6 October; 09:30 (IST) | Report | George 21/28 (75%); PK Te Huna 20/26 (77%); Tuitupou 5/6 (83%) | | Bishop 48/49 (98%); Piggott 12/18 (67%) | Thyagaraj Sports Complex; Umpires: Annie Kloppers, Anne Abraitis; Reserve umpire: Sylvester Campbell |

| Wednesday 6 October; 17:00 (IST) | Report | Papua New Guinea | 46 – 60 | South Africa | Thyagaraj Sports Complex; Umpires: Jonathan Bredin, Joel Young Strong; Reserve umpire: Judith Groves |
| Wednesday 6 October; 17:00 (IST) | Report | Rikis 32/41 (78%); Roberts 14/21 (67%) | | Bootha 21/26 (81%); Gumede 24/27 (89%); Holtzhausen 7/10 (70%); Markgraaff 8/15 (53%) | Thyagaraj Sports Complex; Umpires: Jonathan Bredin, Joel Young Strong; Reserve umpire: Judith Groves |

| Thursday 7 October; 09:30 (IST) | Report | New Zealand | 47 – 41 | England | Thyagaraj Sports Complex; Umpires: Sharon Kelly, Rachael Ayre; Reserve umpire: Paula Ferguson |
| Thursday 7 October; 09:30 (IST) | Report | Tutaia 16/23 (70%) van Dyk 31/34 (91%) | | Cookey 22/26 (85%); Harten 19/27 (70%) | Thyagaraj Sports Complex; Umpires: Sharon Kelly, Rachael Ayre; Reserve umpire: Paula Ferguson |

| Thursday 7 October; 17:00 (IST) | Report | Barbados | 61 – 55 | Papua New Guinea | Thyagaraj Sports Complex; Umpires: Dalton Hinds, Gary Burgess; Reserve umpire: Annie Kloppers |
| Thursday 7 October; 17:00 (IST) | Report | Bishop 39/45 (87%); Piggott 22/28 (79%) | | Baldwin 19/23 (83%); Rikis 26/30 (87%); Roberts 10/13 (77%) | Thyagaraj Sports Complex; Umpires: Dalton Hinds, Gary Burgess; Reserve umpire: Annie Kloppers |

| Friday 8 October; 11:30 (IST) | Report | South Africa | 29 – 70 | New Zealand | Thyagaraj Sports Complex; Umpires: Judith Groves, Paula Ferguson; Reserve umpire: Sharon Kelly |
| Friday 8 October; 11:30 (IST) | Report | Gumede 23/28 (82%); Markgraaff 6/11 (55%) | | Rasmussen 21/35 (60%); Wipiiti 49/57 (86%) | Thyagaraj Sports Complex; Umpires: Judith Groves, Paula Ferguson; Reserve umpire: Sharon Kelly |

| Friday 8 October; 17:00 (IST) | Report | England | 81 – 33 | Cook Islands | Thyagaraj Sports Complex; Umpires: Joel Young Strong, Sylvester Campbell; Reserve umpire: Amanda Nottingham |
| Friday 8 October; 17:00 (IST) | Report | Brownfield 35/39 (90%); Cookey 25/27 (93%); Dunn 21/27 (78%) | | George 17/27 (63%); PK Te Huna 16/24 (67%) | Thyagaraj Sports Complex; Umpires: Joel Young Strong, Sylvester Campbell; Reserve umpire: Amanda Nottingham |

| Saturday 9 October; 09:30 (IST) | Report | Barbados | 43 – 59 | South Africa | Thyagaraj Sports Complex; Umpires: Jonathan Bredin, Bobbi Brown; Reserve umpire: Anne Abraitis |
| Saturday 9 October; 09:30 (IST) | Report | Blackman 2/5 (40%); Bishop 28/33 (85%); Piggott 13/15 (87%) | | Gumede 42/49 (86%); Markgraaff 17/24 (71%) | Thyagaraj Sports Complex; Umpires: Jonathan Bredin, Bobbi Brown; Reserve umpire: Anne Abraitis |

| Saturday 9 October; 15:00 (IST) | Report | Cook Islands | 60 – 58 | Papua New Guinea | Thyagaraj Sports Complex; Umpires: Dalton Hinds, Paula Ferguson; Reserve umpire: Joel Young Strong |
| Saturday 9 October; 15:00 (IST) | Report | PK Te Huna 23/26 (88%); Tuitupou 37/45 (82%) | | Baldwin 7/9 (78%); Rikis 43/48 (90%); Roberts 8/8 (100%) | Thyagaraj Sports Complex; Umpires: Dalton Hinds, Paula Ferguson; Reserve umpire: Joel Young Strong |

| Sunday 10 October; 09:00 (IST) | Report | England | 89 – 31 | Papua New Guinea | Thyagaraj Sports Complex; Umpires: Joel Young Strong, Bobbi Brown; Reserve umpire: Sylvester Campbell |
| Sunday 10 October; 09:00 (IST) | Report | Brownfield 30/33 (91%); Cookey 21/27 (78%); Dunn 26/33 (79%); Harten 12/15 (80%) | | Baldwin 12/20 (60%); Rikis 15/17 (88%); Roberts 4/6 (67%) | Thyagaraj Sports Complex; Umpires: Joel Young Strong, Bobbi Brown; Reserve umpire: Sylvester Campbell |

| Sunday 10 October; 14:00 (IST) | Report | New Zealand | 97 – 22 | Barbados | Thyagaraj Sports Complex; Umpires: Anne Abraitis, Sharon Kelly; Reserve umpire: Joel Young Strong |
| Sunday 10 October; 14:00 (IST) | Report | Rasmussen 18/22 (82%); Tutaia 22/25 (88%) van Dyk 41/45 (91%); Wipiiti 16/18 (89%) | | Bishop 5/6 (83%); Browne 7/10 (70%); Piggott 10/12 (83%) | Thyagaraj Sports Complex; Umpires: Anne Abraitis, Sharon Kelly; Reserve umpire: Joel Young Strong |

| Sunday 10 October; 19:00 (IST) | Report | South Africa | 73 – 40 | Cook Islands | Thyagaraj Sports Complex; Umpires: Judith Groves, Dalton Hinds; Reserve umpire: Sharon Kelly |
| Sunday 10 October; 19:00 (IST) | Report | Bootha 16/23 (70%); Gumede 53/64 (83%); Holtzhausen 4/6 (67%) | | George 4/5 (80%); PK Te Huna 15/20 (75%); Tuitupou 21/28 (75%) | Thyagaraj Sports Complex; Umpires: Judith Groves, Dalton Hinds; Reserve umpire: Sharon Kelly |

== Classification matches ==
| Monday 11 October; 09:30 (IST) | Report | South Africa | 47 – 59 | Malawi | Thyagaraj Sports Complex; Umpires: Jonathan Bredin, Paula Ferguson; Reserve umpire: Amanda Nottingham |
| Monday 11 October; 09:30 (IST) | Report | Bootha 11/15 (73%); Gumede 36/39 (92%) | | Kumwenda 37/38 (97%); Waya 22/23 (96%) | Thyagaraj Sports Complex; Umpires: Jonathan Bredin, Paula Ferguson; Reserve umpire: Amanda Nottingham |

| Monday 11 October; 11:30 (IST) | Report | Barbados | 60 – 59 | Trinidad and Tobago | Thyagaraj Sports Complex; Umpires: Rachael Ayre, Judith Groves; Reserve umpire: Sharon Kelly |
| Monday 11 October; 11:30 (IST) | Report | Bishop 44/52 (85%); Browne 6/7 (86%); Piggott 10/12 (83%) | | Barker 6/7 (86%); Cooper 20/24 (83%); Wilson 33/35 (94%) | Thyagaraj Sports Complex; Umpires: Rachael Ayre, Judith Groves; Reserve umpire: Sharon Kelly |

| Monday 11 October; 15:00 (IST) | Report | Cook Islands | 43 – 68 | Samoa | Thyagaraj Sports Complex; Umpires: Dalton Hinds, Bobbi Brown; Reserve umpire: Sylvester Campbell |
| Monday 11 October; 15:00 (IST) | Report | Davida 5/7 (71%); George 8/10 (80%); PK Te Huna 17/22 (77%); Tuitupou 13/16 (81%) | | Chang 8/10 (80%); Faasavalu 3/5 (60%); Fuimaono 15/19 (79%); Langi 42/49 (86%) | Thyagaraj Sports Complex; Umpires: Dalton Hinds, Bobbi Brown; Reserve umpire: Sylvester Campbell |

| Monday 11 October; 17:00 (IST) | Report | Papua New Guinea | 78 – 41 | India | Thyagaraj Sports Complex; Umpires: Joel Young Strong, Anne Abraitis; Reserve umpire: Annie Kloppers |
| Monday 11 October; 17:00 (IST) | Report | Rikis 44/47 (94%); Roberts 34/39 (87%) | | Bajaj 18/22 (82%); H. Kaur 1/1 (100%); Tehlan 22/26 (85%) | Thyagaraj Sports Complex; Umpires: Joel Young Strong, Anne Abraitis; Reserve umpire: Annie Kloppers |

== Medal playoffs ==
Semi-Finals
Australia | 51
England | 45
New Zealand | 59
Jamaica | 43

Gold Medal Match
Australia | 64
New Zealand | 66
Bronze Medal Match
England | 70
Jamaica | 47

| Tuesday 12 October; 13:00 (IST) | Report | Australia | 51 – 45 | England | Thyagaraj Sports Complex; Umpires: Sylvester Campbell, Amanda Nottingham; Reserve umpire: Jonathan Bredin |
| Tuesday 12 October; 13:00 (IST) | Report | McMahon 20/23 (87%); Medhurst 31/33 (94%) | | Brownfield 4/5 (80%); Cookey 23/23 (100%); Harten 18/25 (72%) | Thyagaraj Sports Complex; Umpires: Sylvester Campbell, Amanda Nottingham; Reserve umpire: Jonathan Bredin |

| Tuesday 12 October; 15:00 (IST) | Report | New Zealand | 59 – 43 | Jamaica | Thyagaraj Sports Complex; Umpires: Gary Burgess, Sharon Kelly; Reserve umpire: Paula Ferguson |
| Tuesday 12 October; 15:00 (IST) | Report | Tutaia 27/36 (75%) van Dyk 32/32 (100%) | | R. Aiken 36/44 (82%); Forbes 4/8 (50%); Fowler 3/4 (75%) | Thyagaraj Sports Complex; Umpires: Gary Burgess, Sharon Kelly; Reserve umpire: Paula Ferguson |

| Thursday 14 October; 11:30 (IST) | Report | England | 70 – 47 | Jamaica | Thyagaraj Sports Complex; Umpires: Sharon Kelly, Amanda Nottingham; Reserve umpire: Paula Ferguson |
| Thursday 14 October; 11:30 (IST) | Report | Brownfield 31/34 (91%); Cookey 33/39 (85%); Harten 6/9 (67%) | | R. Aiken 23/26 (88%); Forbes 24/26 (92%) | Thyagaraj Sports Complex; Umpires: Sharon Kelly, Amanda Nottingham; Reserve umpire: Paula Ferguson |

| Thursday 14 October 2010; 13:30 (IST) | Report | Australia | 64 – 66 | New Zealand | Thyagaraj Sports Complex; Umpires: Gary Burgess, Sylvester Campbell; Reserve umpire: Judith Groves |
| Thursday 14 October 2010; 13:30 (IST) | Report | Cox 20/26 (77%); McMahon 30/34 (88%); Medhurst 14/18 (78%) | | Tutaia 41/50 (82%) van Dyk 25/29 (86%) | Thyagaraj Sports Complex; Umpires: Gary Burgess, Sylvester Campbell; Reserve umpire: Judith Groves |

== Final standings ==
| Place | Nation |
|---|---|
| Gold | New Zealand |
| Silver | Australia |
| Bronze | England |
| 4 | Jamaica |
| 5 | Malawi |
| 6 | South Africa |
| 7 | Barbados |
| 8 | Trinidad and Tobago |
| 9 | Samoa |
| 10 | Cook Islands |
| 11 | Papua New Guinea |
| 12 | India |

== Medallists ==
| Gold | Silver | Bronze |
|---|---|---|
| New Zealand; Coach: Ruth Aitken | Australia; Coach: Norma Plummer | England; Coach: Maggie Jackson |
| Liana Leota; Leana de Bruin; Temepara George; Katrina Grant; Joline Henry; Laura Langman; Grace Rasmussen; Anna Scarlett; Maria Tutaia; Irene van Dyk; Casey Williams; Daneka Wipiiti | Rebecca Bulley; Catherine Cox; Laura Geitz; Susan Fuhrmann; Mo'onia Gerrard; Kimberlee Green; Renae Hallinan; Sharelle McMahon; Natalie Medhurst; Lauren Nourse; Susan Pratley; Natalie von Bertouch | Karen Atkinson; Sara Bayman; Eboni Beckford-Chambers; Louisa Brownfield; Jade Clarke; Pamela Cookey; Rachel Dunn; Stacey Francis; Tamsin Greenway; Joanne Harten; Geva Mentor; Sonia Mkoloma |

2010 Commonwealth champions

New Zealand
Second title
