= Bermuda national netball team =

National netball team

Bermuda
- Nickname(s): Longtails
- Association: Netball Bermuda
- Confederation: Americas Netball
- Head coach: Kimale Evans
- Asst coach: Anthony Mouchette
- Manager: Antione Williams
- Captain: Debré Evans
- Vice-captain: Kianté Lightbourne
- World ranking: 21st
Team colours	Alternate

Netball World Cup
- Appearances: 4 (Debuted in 1979)
- 2003 placing: 22nd
- Best result: 10th (1987)

The Bermuda national netball team represents Netball Bermuda in international netball tournaments. They featured at the 1979, 1987, 1995 and the 2003 World Netball Championships. As of 1 June 2026, Bermuda are listed 21st on the World Netball Rankings.

== Tournament history ==
=== Major tournaments ===
==== Netball World Cup ====
Tournaments	Place
1979 World Netball Tournament	19th
1987 World Netball Tournament	10th
1995 World Netball Championships	23rd
2003 World Netball Championships	22nd

=== Americas tournaments ===
==== AFNA Championship ====
Tournaments	Place
2012 AFNA Championships	8th

==== Central American and Caribbean Games ====
Tournaments	Place
2026 Central American and Caribbean Games	5th

=== Invitationals ===
Tournaments	Place
2017 Netball Europe Open Challenge	3rd
2025 Battle of the Isles Tournament	2nd

== Notable players ==
=== 2025 squad ===
This recent squad was selected for the 2025 Battle of the Isles Tournament.

Bermuda national netball team roster
Players
Coaches

Name	Pos	DOB	Height	Club	Nat	Caps
Terita Bean	C, WA, WD		–
Demiqua Daniels	GK, GD		–
Zakiyah Durham	GS, GA		–
Debré Evans (c)	GK, GD		–
Keizhari Knight	GS, GA		–
Kaylee Lema	C, WA, WD		–
Kianté Lightbourne (vc)	GK, GD		–
Khianda Pearman	GK, GD		–
Inshanae Smith	GS, GA		–
Jahkenya Trott	GS, GA		–
Jahtuere Trott	C, WA, WD		–
Sèlah Tuzo	C, WA, WD		–

Head coach

- Kimale Evans

Assistant coach

- Anthony Mouchette
  Team Manager:
  Antione Williams
  Assistant Team Manager:
  Tanika White

Notes

- (c) – Captain
- (cc) – Co-captain
- (vc) – Vice-captain
- – Injury / maternity leave
- (TRP) – Temporary Replacement Player

=== Captains ===
Captains	Years
June Dill	1977, 1979
Karen Jones-Simmons	2012
Dominque Richardson	2017
Debré Evans	2025

== Coaches ==
=== Head coaches ===
Coach	Years
Marva Trott	1979
Carol Bean	1987
Colette Thomson	1995
Carol Bean	2003
Anthony Mouchette	2012
Ilze Gideons	2017
Kimale Evans	2025
